= 1908–09 Manchester City F.C. season =

English football club season

Manchester City F.C.
1908–09 season
- Manager: Harry Newbould
- Football League First Division: 19th (relegated)
- FA Cup: First round
- Top goalscorer: League: Thornley (18 goals); All: Thornley (18 goals)
- Highest home attendance: 40,000 vs Manchester United (19 September 1908)
- Lowest home attendance: 3,000 vs Nottingham Forest (13 April 1909)

The 1908–09 season was Manchester City F.C.'s 18th season of league football and 6th consecutive season in the top flight of English football.

In a season where Manchester City recorded one of the stronger home records in the league, the club nevertheless finished 19th and was relegated despite winning more matches than several teams above them in the standings.only four teams won more games than them and only five teams scored more, City still finished 19th and became only the second team since the abolition of test matches eleven years earlier to be relegated on goal average - all of this arguably contributing to one of the earliest of the many bizarre circumstances in their history which has become known by supporters as "Typical City".

== Football League First Division ==
Pos	Team	Pld	W	D	L	GF	GA	GAv	Pts	Relegation
16	Liverpool	38	15	6	17	57	65	0.877	36	
17	Bury	38	14	8	16	63	77	0.818	36	
18	Bradford City	38	12	10	16	47	47	1.000	34	
19	Manchester City (R)	38	15	4	19	67	69	0.971	34	Relegation to the Second Division
20	Leicester Fosse (R)	38	8	9	21	54	102	0.529	25	Relegation to the Second Division

Source: World Football
Rules for classification: 1) Points; 2) Goal average; 3) Goals scored
(R) Relegated

=== Results summary ===
Overall								Home						Away					
Pld	W	D	L	GF	GA	GAv	Pts	W	D	L	GF	GA	Pts	W	D	L	GF	GA	Pts
38	15	4	19	67	69	0.971	34	12	3	4	50	23	27	3	1	15	17	46	7

Source: rsssf.com

=== Reports ===
Date	Opponents	H / A	Venue	Result F – A	Scorers	Attendance
1 September 1908	Sunderland	H	Hyde Road	1 – 0	Eadie	25,000
5 September 1908	Blackburn Rovers	H	Hyde Road	3 – 3	Thornley (2), Jones	30,000
12 September 1908	Bradford City	A	Valley Parade	0 – 0		30,000
19 September 1908	Manchester United	H	Hyde Road	1 – 2	Thornley	40,000
26 September 1908	Everton	A	Goodison Park	3 – 6	Thornley (3)	20,000
3 October 1908	Leicester Fosse	H	Hyde Road	5 – 2	Grieve (2), Ross (2), Dorsett	15,000
10 October 1908	Woolwich Arsenal	A	Manor Ground	0 – 3		10,000
17 October 1908	Notts County	H	Hyde Road	1 – 0	Thornley	20,000
24 October 1908	Newcastle United	A	St James' Park	0 – 2		25,000
31 October 1908	Bristol City	H	Hyde Road	5 – 1	Thornley (2), Buchan, Dorsett, Wood	20,000
7 November 1908	Preston North End	A	Deepdale	0 – 3		10,000
14 November 1908	Middlesbrough	H	Hyde Road	0 – 0		18,000
21 November 1908	The Wednesday	A	Owlerton	1 – 3	Thornley	11,000
28 November 1908	Liverpool	A	Anfield	3 – 1	Dorsett, Conlin, Jones	15,000
5 December 1908	Bury	H	Hyde Road	6 – 1	Thornley (3), Dorsett (2), Stewart	30,000
12 December 1908	Sheffield United	A	Bramall Lane	0 – 4		12,000
19 December 1908	Aston Villa	H	Hyde Road	2 – 0	Dorsett, Holford	18,000
25 December 1908	Chelsea	H	Hyde Road	1 – 2	Dorsett	25,000
26 December 1908	Chelsea	A	Stamford Bridge	2 – 1	Jones, Ross	40,000
28 December 1908	Nottingham Forest	A	City Ground	2 – 0	Holford, Ross	10,000
2 January 1909	Blackburn Rovers	A	Ewood Park	2 – 3	Wood, Conlin	12,000
9 January 1909	Bradford City	H	Hyde Road	4 – 3	Holford (3), Conlin	10,000
23 January 1909	Manchester United	A	Bank Street	1 – 3	Conlin	40,000
30 January 1909	Everton	H	Hyde Road	4 – 0	Holford (3), Wilkinson	30,000
13 February 1909	Woolwich Arsenal	H	Hyde Road	2 – 2	Buchan, Holford	20,000
20 February 1909	Notts County	A	Trent Bridge	1 – 5	Dorsett	4,000
27 February 1909	Newcastle United	H	Hyde Road	0 – 2		30,000
11 March 1909	Leicester Fosse	A	Filbert Street	1 – 3	Thornley	8,000
13 March 1909	Preston North End	H	Hyde Road	4 – 1	Thornley (2), Yuill, Jones	12,000
20 March 1909	Middlesbrough	A	Ayresome Park	0 – 3		10,000
27 March 1909	The Wednesday	H	Hyde Road	4 – 0	Holford (3), Jones	12,000
3 April 1909	Liverpool	H	Hyde Road	4 – 0	Buchan, Jones, Ross, Dorsett	15,000
9 April 1909	Sunderland	A	Roker Park	0 – 2		15,000
10 April 1909	Bury	A	Gigg Lane	0 – 1		16,000
13 April 1909	Nottingham Forest	H	Hyde Road	2 – 1	Thornley, Conlin	3,000
17 April 1909	Sheffield United	H	Hyde Road	1 – 3	Thornley	10,000
24 April 1909	Aston Villa	A	Villa Park	1 – 2	Buchan	15,000
28 April 1909	Bristol City	A	Ashton Gate	0 – 1		8,000

== FA Cup ==
Date	Round	Opponents	H / A	Venue	Result F – A	Scorers	Attendance
16 January 1909	First round	Tottenham Hotspur	H	Hyde Road	3 – 4	Holford (3)	20,000

== Squad statistics ==
=== Squad ===
Appearances for competitive matches only

Pos.	Name	League		FA Cup		Total	
Pos.	Name	Apps	Goals	Apps	Goals	Apps	Goals
GK	(England) Herbert Broomfield	4	0	0	0	4	0
GK	(England) Walter Smith	34	0	1	0	35	0
DF	(Scotland) James Buchan	38	4	1	0	39	4
DF	(England) Frank Buckley	4	0	0	0	4	0
DF	(England) Charlie Burgess	26	0	0	0	26	0
MF	(England) George Dorsett	22	9	1	0	23	9
MF	(England) Tom Holford	26	12	1	3	27	15
FW	(England) John Brown	4	0	0	0	4	0
FW	(England) Patsy Hendren	2	0	0	0	2	0
FW	(Wales) Lot Jones	29	6	1	0	30	6
FW	(England) Davie Ross	22	5	1	0	23	5
FW	(Scotland) George Stewart	8	1	1	0	9	1
FW	(England) Irvine Thornley	32	18	0	0	32	18
FW	(England) Charles Webb	11	0	0	0	11	0
FW	(England) John Wood	6	2	0	0	6	2
MF	(Scotland) James Blair	31	0	0	0	31	0
MF	(England) Bill Bottomley	1	0	0	0	1	0
FW	(England) James Conlin	27	5	1	0	28	5
MF	(Scotland) Bill Eadie	10	1	1	0	11	1
FW	(Scotland) Bob Grieve	8	2	0	0	8	2
FW	Ernest Hitchcock	1	0	0	0	1	0
DF	(England) Bertram Jackson	22	0	0	0	22	0
DF	(Scotland) Tommy Kelso	21	0	1	0	22	0
FW	(England) Eversley Mansfield	1	0	0	0	1	0
DF	(England) Frank Norgrove	7	0	1	0	8	0
MF	David Ramsey	1	0	0	0	1	0
MF	(England) Jimmy Wilkinson	17	1	1	0	18	1
FW	(England) Jack Yuill	3	1	0	0	3	1

=== Scorers ===
==== All ====
Scorer	Goals
(England) Irvine Thornley	18
(England) Tom Holford	15
(England) George Dorsett	9
(Wales) Lot Jones	6
(England) James Conlin	5
(England) Davie Ross	5
(Scotland) James Buchan	4
(Scotland) Bob Grieve	2
(England) John Wood	2
(Scotland) Bill Eadie	1
(Scotland) George Stewart	1
(England) Jimmy Wilkinson	1
(England) Jack Yuill	1

==== League ====
Scorer	Goals
(England) Irvine Thornley	18
(England) Tom Holford	12
(England) George Dorsett	9
(Wales) Lot Jones	6
(England) James Conlin	5
(England) Davie Ross	5
(Scotland) James Buchan	4
(Scotland) Bob Grieve	2
(England) John Wood	2
(Scotland) Bill Eadie	1
(Scotland) George Stewart	1
(England) Jimmy Wilkinson	1
(England) Jack Yuill	1

==== FA Cup ====
Scorer	Goals
(England) Tom Holford	3

== See also ==
- Manchester City F.C. seasons
