= List of Manchester City F.C. players =

Details of the key players who have appeared for Manchester City F.C

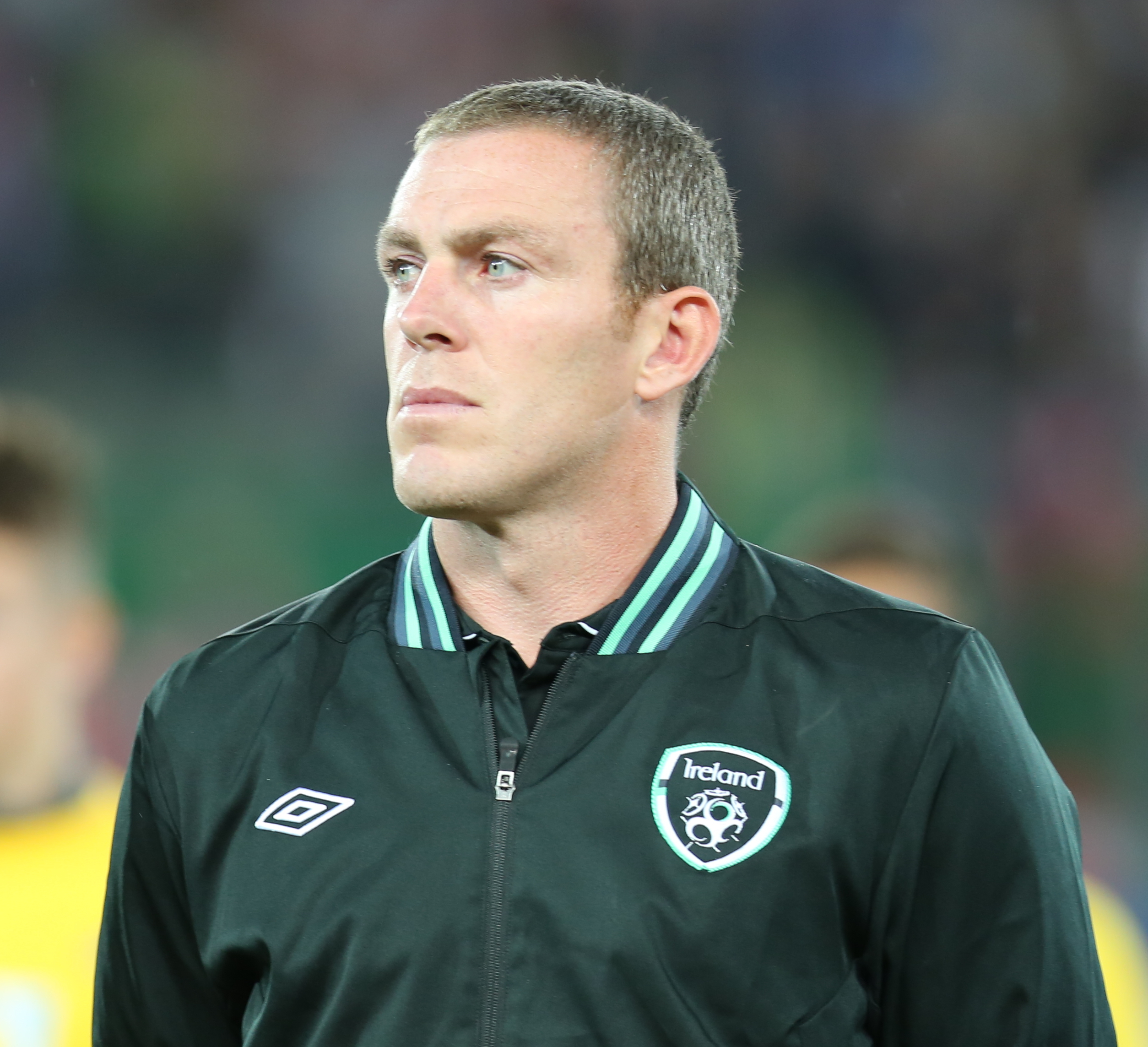
Richard Dunne played for the club for nine years between 2000 and 2009, making 352 appearances and scoring 8 goals. He won the Player of the Year award four times, the club record, since equalled by Kevin De Bruyne, and is currently a coach in the club's Academy.

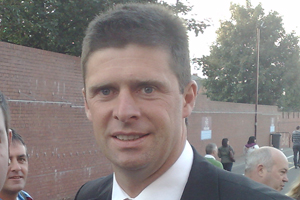
Niall Quinn made 244 appearances for the club between 1990 and 1996, scoring a total of 77 goals. He was voted Player of the Year in 1991 and is an inductee of both the National Hall of Fame and the club's own Hall of Fame.

Manchester City Football Club, then known as Ardwick, first entered the Football League in the 1892–93 season. Since that time the club's first team has competed in numerous nationally and internationally organised competitions, and all players who have played in 100 or more such matches are listed below, which encompasses all players who have been inducted into the Manchester City Hall of Fame. (Note: The statistical data for the majority of the players who had played 100 or more matches for the club prior to the start of season 2003–04 is sourced from Manchester City – The Complete Record.) Also included are all winners of the Player of the Year award, which has been awarded annually since 1967 by the Manchester City Official Supporters Club based on a ballot of the supporters.

Alan Oakes holds the record for Manchester City league appearances, having played 565 matches between 1959 and 1976. If all senior competitions are included, Oakes has 680.

As of June 2026, the player who have won the most international caps while playing at the club is Bernardo Silva for Portugal with 96 caps . Prior to Bernardo Silva achieving this distinction the record had previously been held by David Silva for Spain (87 caps), Joe Hart (63 caps) and Colin Bell, the latter of which held the record for over 40 years with 48 England appearances between 1968 and 1975. The current squad member with the most caps in total is Mateo Kovačić who has a total of 122 caps for Croatia (27 while a City player), while Erling Haaland holds the record for most international goals scored while at the club, netting 48 for Norway in just 40 appearances.

The Manchester City player who has been capped the most times for England in total is Frank Lampard, who was capped 106 times for England between October 1999 and June 2014, but he only played for City for one season in 2014–15 after he had retired from international duty. The Manchester City player who has been capped the most times totally internationally is Shay Given, who was capped for the Republic of Ireland 134 times from 1996 to 2016. He played for the club for two and a half seasons between 2009 and 2011.

Sergio Agüero holds the Manchester City goalscoring record across all competitions; is the club's highest league goalscorer; and holds numerous other club records set between 2011 and 2021. As of May 2021, when he left the club, Agüero's record stood at 184 league goals scored and 260 overall.

Erling Haaland holds the club and Premier League records for league goals, and club record for total goals in a single season, with 36 league goals, 52 overall in 2022–23. This single season tally also means Haaland additionally currently holds the record for most goals scored per game played in a season, his 52 goals in 53 appearances yielding a goal scoring rate of 0.97 goals per game. Haaland is also the first City player to win five prestigious individual football awards in a season and the first to win the UEFA Men's Player of the Year Award, and the player who has scored the most international goals while a City player.

In 2024 Rodri became the first current City player to win the Ballon d'Or.

== Sourcing, currency and key for the statistics ==
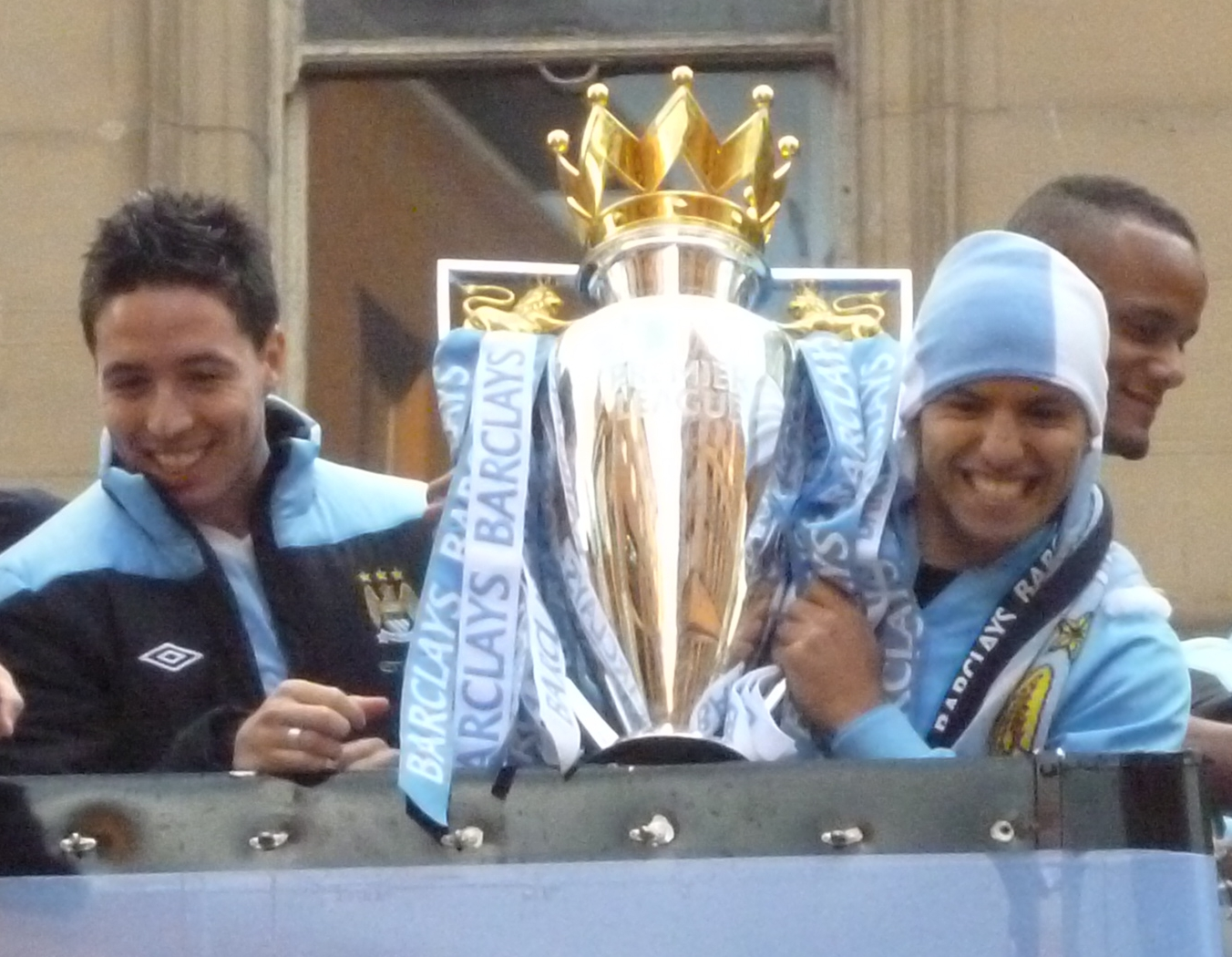
Samir Nasri and Sergio Agüero won two and five Premier League titles with Manchester City, respectively.

The following information applies to both of the tables listed in the next section of this article:

Order

- Players are listed according to the date of their first team debut for the club.

Legend

- Players listed in **bold** are inductees of one or more of the following: the Manchester City Hall of Fame, the National Football Museum Hall of Fame, the Scottish Football Museum Hall of Fame, or the Premier League Hall of Fame.
- Players listed in italics are winners of the Player of the Year award (and the number of times they have each received this award is shown in the "PotY" column).

Nationality

- Normally the player's country of birth or later adopted nationality. In the case of a country such as Germany that has been unified it will indicate whichever of the prior nations, West or East, determined how that player was capped at international level during his playing career despite his nationality now being simply German.

Club career

- Club career is defined as the first and last calendar years in which the player appeared for the club in any of the competitions listed below, regardless of how long the player was contracted to the club. For players who had two or more spells at the club, the years for each period are listed separately.

Positions tactical evolution
Pre-1970s		1970s onwards	
GK	Goalkeeper		
DF	Full back	DF	Full back or Wing back
MF	Centre half	DF	Centre back
MF	Half back	MF	Holding midfielder
FW	Outside forward (a.k.a. Winger)	DF MF	Wing back or Attacking midfielder
FW	Inside forward	MF FW	Attacking midfielder / Second striker
FW	Centre forward	FW	Centre forward / Striker / False #9

Position

- Playing positions are listed according to the tactical formations that were employed at the time. Thus the more defensive emphasis in the responsibilities of many of the old forward and midfield positions, and their corresponding name changes, reflects the tactical evolution that occurred in the sport from the late 1960s onwards. The position listed is that in which the player played most frequently for the club.

The following information applies only to the table of "Historic players" listed in the next section:

Appearances and Goals

- Appearances and goals comprise those in the Football League (including test matches and play-offs), Premier League, FA Cup, Football League Cup, UEFA European Cup, UEFA Cup, FA Charity Shield, Associate Members' Cup/Football League Trophy, and several now-defunct competitions — namely the European Cup Winners' Cup, Anglo-Italian Cup, Anglo-Italian League Cup, Texaco Cup, Anglo-Scottish Cup and Full Members' Cup.
- Substitute appearances in any of the above included fixtures, and any goals scored as a substitute, are also included.
- Appearances or goals scored in testimonial matches, exhibition games, or in any abandoned fixtures, are excluded.
- Appearances in the 1939–40 Football League season (abandoned after three games because of the Second World War, and the records for which were expunged from official records), and any other matches played in wartime competitions, are excluded.

Statistics sourcing

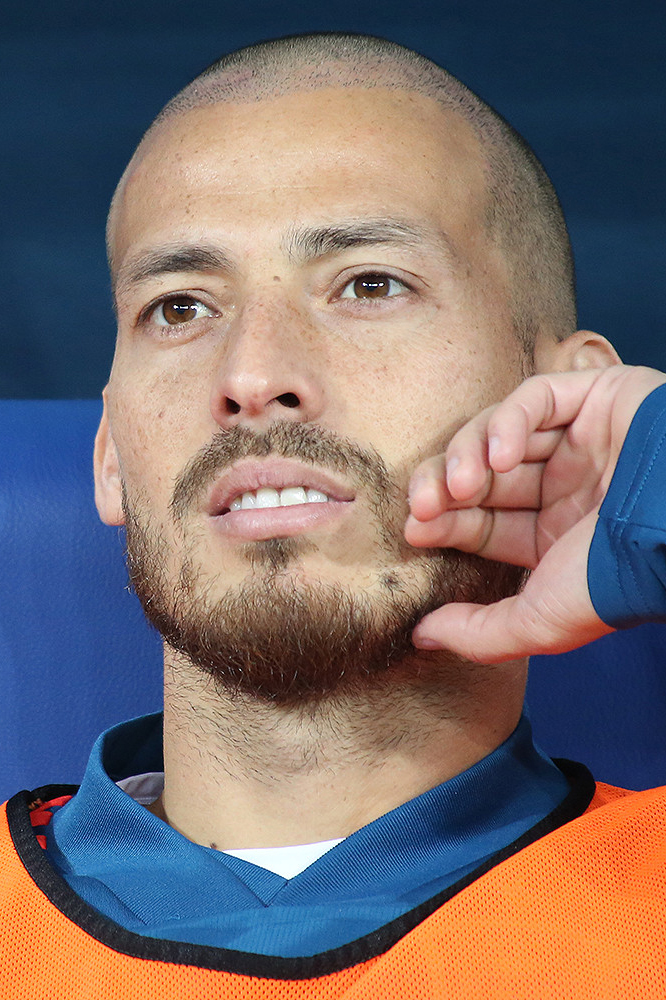
David Silva won four Premier Leagues titles, two FA Cups and five League Cups with Manchester City between 2010 and 2020.

- All of the Player of the Year data in the table is sourced from the history pages of the Happy to be Blue! web site, which lists all award winners up to, and including, season 2011–12.
- All dates and numbers in the table are sourced from a hardcover book published in 2006 according to the inclusion / exclusion rules stated above. The individual table entries of a number of these players have subsequently been sourced from the web wherever possible.
- In the case of players whose football careers at Manchester City spanned either of the two world wars, the choice of which appearances, during and either side of the wartime period, are included in the "official" tally of games played may cause discrepancies with other possible sources of similar data for those particular players. Likewise, how competitions such as the Charity Shield, Anglo-Scottish Cup and the Texaco Cup are handled by other sources will also create discrepancies with the numbers included in the table below.

Currency

- The statistics are correct as of the beginning of 2004.

The following information applies only to the table of "Contemporary players" listed in the next section:

Appearances and goals

- Appearances and goals are broken out into four column pairs, with the rightmost column pair depicting the respective totals of the appearances and goals shown in the three leftmost column pairs.
- The appearances and goals listed under the "League" column pair heading comprise those in the top two tiers of the Football League (including any Football League play-off games) and the Premier League.
- The appearances and goals listed under the "Cups" column pair heading comprise only those in the FA Cup and Football League Cup.
- The appearances and goals listed under the "Other" column pair heading comprise those in the UEFA Champions League, UEFA Europa League/UEFA Cup, the FA Community Shield, and the Football League Trophy.
- Substitute appearances in any of the above included fixtures, and any goals scored as a substitute, are also included.
- Appearances or goals scored in testimonial matches, exhibition games, or in any abandoned fixtures, are excluded.

Statistics sourcing

- Most of the Player of the Year data in the following table (and elsewhere in this article) is sourced from the history pages of the Happy to be Blue! web site, which lists all award winners up to, and including, season 2011–12. Winners of the PotY award since 2012 are individually cited from elsewhere on the web.
- Most of the dates and numbers in the table are sourced from the Soccerbase online database as indicated by the individual cited reference notes for each of the players. The remainder are sourced from Gary James' book.
- However, Soccerbase has a few issues. It seems to identify all player appearances and goals scored in Community Shield fixtures on an individual season basis, but does not necessarily include all those appearances in the total appearances tally of certain players. Regardless, the core match data on which those tallies are sometimes mis-totalled is quite sound and accessible in alternative ways, and thus can be used to (self-)correct the database's own tallying errors if properly footnoted.
- Goals later reassigned by the Premier League "Dubious Goals Committee" also tend to get overlooked by Soccerbase. Some goals that have never even come before the DGC have been misattributed to other players despite the rest of the football media correctly attributing them. Whatever the source of the discrepancy it can be addressed by footnote reference to alternative match reports for the games in question – which correctly attribute the dubious goal(s) – and by providing links to documentation of the pertinent DGC reassignment findings elsewhere on the web.

Currency

- The statistics are correct as of the last match of the 2022–23 season, which was played on 10 June 2023.

== List of players ==
The list of Manchester City players with over 100 appearances, or winners of "Player of the Year" award, is presented below in two tables. The first table lists all the club's historic players, providing only the basic "appearances" and "goals" totals for each of them. The second table groups together the club's most recent players, providing a more detailed breakdown of their "appearances" and "goals" statistics (and with the current players highlighted in blue for easy reference).

=== Historic players ===
Player	Nat.	Position	Club career	Apps.	Goals	PotY	Refs.
Billy Meredith	Wales	Winger	1894–1905; 1921–1924	393	151		
Charlie Williams	England	Goalkeeper	1894–1902	232	1		
Bobby Moffatt	Scotland	Half back	1895–1903	163	7		
Billy Holmes	England	Half back	1896–1904	166	4		
Fred Williams	England	Forward	1896–1902	130	38		
Billie Gillespie	England	Forward	1897–1905	231	132		
Buxton Smith	England	Half back	1897–1902	153	8		
Di Jones	Wales	Full back	1898–1902	118	1		
Tommy Hynds	Scotland	Centre half	1901–1906	171	9		
Frank Booth	England	Winger	1902–1912	107	19		
Jack Hillman	England	Goalkeeper	1902–1906	124	0		
Johnny McMahon	England	Centre half	1902–1906	109	1		
Sandy Turnbull	Scotland	Forward	1902–1906	119	60		
Billy Lot Jones	Wales	Forward	1903–1915	301	74		
Irvine Thornley	England	Forward	1904–1912	204	93		
James Buchan	Scotland	Half back	1905–1911	164	10		
George Dorsett	England	Half back	1905–1912	211	65		
George Stewart	Scotland	Winger	1906–1911	102	13		
Jimmy Conlin	England	Winger	1906–1911	175	30		
Tommy Kelso	Scotland	Full back	1906–1913	151	3		
Bill Eadie	England	Half back	1906–1913	204	6		
Bertram Jackson	England	Full back	1907–1911	101	0		
Bill Bottomley	England	Half back	1908–1915	103	2		
Tom Holford	England	Half back	1908–1914	183	38		
George Wynn	Wales	Forward	1909–1919	127	59		
Joe Dorsett	England	Winger	1910–1920	138	17		
Eli Fletcher	England	Full back	1911–1925	326	2		
Jim Goodchild	England	Goalkeeper	1911–1926	217	0		
Billy Henry	Scotland	Full back	1911–1919	157	1		
Harry Taylor	England	Forward	1912–1921	101	28		
Tommy Browell	England	Forward	1913–1926	247	139		
Horace Barnes	England	Forward	1914–1924	235	125		
Sam Cookson	England	Full back	1919–1927	306	1		
Tommy Johnson	England	Forward	1920–1930	354	166		
Billy "Spud" Murphy	England	Winger	1919–1926	220	31		
Micky Hamill	England	Half back	1920–1924	128	2		
Sammy Sharp	England	Half back	1920–1928	182	1		
James Mitchell	England	Goalkeeper	1922–1926	109	0		
Charlie Pringle	Scotland	Half back	1922–1928	216	1		
Frank Roberts	England	Forward	1922–1929	237	130		
Billy Austin	England	Forward	1924–1931	172	47		
Sam Cowan	England	Centre half	1924–1935	407	24		
George Hicks	England	Winger	1924–1928	135	48		
Phillip McCloy	Scotland	Full back	1925–1929	157	0		
Jimmy McMullan	Scotland	Half back	1925–1933	242	12		
Matt Barrass	England	Half back / Forward	1925–1933	172	15		
Eric Brook	England	Winger	1928–1939	493 (Note: Some well-respected statistics sources include in players' total appearances tallies the three rounds of league games played by Manchester City at the start of the 1939–40 season, before war was declared on 3 September and the football league was officially abandoned. Frank Swift, Eric Brook, Alec Herd and Peter Doherty all played in each of those matches, and when these three fixtures are included in their official appearances tallies they are three games larger than they should be. Because those matches have long been expunged from official league records and these games should similarly not be included in these players' official total games tallies. When these war time fixtures are properly accounted for Swift's total appearances for Manchester City become 375 (not 378), Brook's total appearances for the club become 493 (not 496), Herd's total appearances for the club become 288 (not 291), and Doherty's total appearances for the club become 131 (not 134).)	178		
Bobby Marshall	England	Forward / Centre half	1928–1938	356	80		
John Ridley	England	Full back	1927–1933	184	0		
Fred Tilson	England	Forward	1928–1938	275	132		
Matt Busby	Scotland	Half back	1928–1936	227	14		
Ernie Toseland	England	Winger	1929–1939	411	75		
Jackie Bray	England	Half back	1929–1940	279	10		
Len Langford	England	Goalkeeper	1930–1933	125	0		
Bill Dale	England	Full back	1931–1938	271	0		
Alec Herd	Scotland	Forward	1933–1948	288	125		
Sam Barkas	England	Full back	1933–1947	196	1		
Jack Percival	England	Half back	1933–1946	174	8		
Frank Swift	England	Goalkeeper	1933–1949	375	0		
Peter Doherty	Ireland	Forward	1936–1939	131	80 (Note: Some well-respected statistics sources include in players' total goals tallies goals scored in the three rounds of league games played by Manchester City at the start of the 1939–40 season, before war was declared on 3 September and the football league was officially abandoned. Peter Doherty played in all of those matches and scored a goal in each of the first two games, and when these two goals are included in his official goals tally it is two goals larger than it should be. Because those matches have long been expunged from official league records and those goals should similarly not be included in his official total goals tally. When these war time fixtures are properly accounted for Doherty's total goals for Manchester City become 80 (not 82).)		
Albert Emptage	England	Half back	1937–1951	144	1		
Eric Westwood	England	Full back	1937–1953	260	5		
Les McDowall	England	Half back	1938–1948	126	8		
Bert Sproston	England	Full back	1938–1949	131	5		
Billy Walsh	Ireland/ Republic of Ireland	Half back	1938–1950	118	1		
George Smith	England	Forward	1939–1951	179	80		
Andy Black	Scotland	Forward	1946–1950	146	52		
Johnny Hart	England	Forward	1946–1961	178	73		
Roy Clarke	Wales	Winger	1947–1958	370	79		
Ken Branagan	England	Full back	1948–1961	208	3		
Roy Little	England	Full back	1949–1958	187	2		
Bert Trautmann	Germany	Goalkeeper	1949–1964	545	0		
Ken Barnes	England	Half back	1952–1961	282	19		
Roy Paul	Wales	Half back	1950–1957	294	9		
Billy Spurdle	England	Half back	1950–1956	172	33		
Jimmy Meadows	England	Full back / Winger	1951–1955	141	31		
Don Revie	England	Forward	1951–1956	178	41		
Dave Ewing	Scotland	Centre half	1953–1962	303	1		
Paddy Fagan	Republic of Ireland	Winger	1953–1960	165	35		
Joe Hayes	England	Forward	1953–1965	364	152		
Bill Leivers	England	Full back	1953–1964	282	4		
Billy McAdams	Northern Ireland	Forward	1953–1960	134	65		
Bobby Johnstone	Scotland	Forward	1955–1959	139	51		
Cliff Sear	Wales	Full back	1956–1967	279	1		
Colin Barlow	England	Winger	1957–1963	189	80		
Roy Cheetham	England	Winger	1957–1967	143	4		
George Hannah	England	Forward	1958–1963	131	16		
Alan Oakes	England	Midfielder	1959–1976	682	34	1	
Barrie Betts	England	Defender	1960–1964	117	6		
David Wagstaffe	England	Winger	1960–1964	161	8		
Harry Dowd	England	Goalkeeper	1961–1970	219	1		
Bobby Kennedy	Scotland	Defender / Midfielder	1961–1969	254	9		
Glyn Pardoe	England	Full back / Forward	1962–1975	380	22 (Note: Sources differ over the scorer of an FA Cup goal against Blackpool in 1966. James and the MCFCstats website credit it to Johnny Crossan, Baskcomb credits it to Glyn Pardoe. The figures in this table assign the goal to Crossan.)	1	
Neil Young	England	Forward	1961–1971	416	111		
David Connor	England	Winger	1962–1972; 1974–1975	168	10		
Matt Gray	Scotland	Forward	1963–1967	101	23		
Mike Doyle	England	Defender	1965–1978	570	41	2	
Johnny Crossan	Northern Ireland	Forward	1965–1967	110	28		
George Heslop	England	Centre half	1965–1972	203	3		
Mike Summerbee	England	Winger	1965–1975	452	68	2	
Tony Book	England	Full back	1966–1973	315 (Note: Tony Book's total appearances for the club are normally reported as 315 and Tommy Booth's total appearances for the club are normally reported as 491. These discrepancies relative to the M.E.N. sources being used to support the total appearances stats. of these two players are due to the UEFA European Cup Winners Cup tie away leg fixture played against Honved on 21 October 1970. The cited M.E.N. sources for both Book's and Booth's total appearances tallies align themselves with this team selection in which Book plays no part in the match, and his normal right back position is taken by Tommy Booth. However, at this particular time Tommy Booth was suffering from an injury that kept him out of first team action for around 3 months, so this data is believed to be erroneous. Likewise, the main book source for this table reports Book as being in the starting line-up for this game and Booth as taking no part in it. Consequently, this particular table entry has been editorially adjusted to be in alignment with the main book source.)	5	1	
Colin Bell	England	Midfielder	1966–1979	501	153	1	
Tommy Booth	England	Centre half	1968–1981	491	36 (Note: Sources differ over the scorer of a goal in an Anglo-Scottish Cup tie against Sheffield United played at Maine Road on 9 August 1975. James in his book (p. 515) credits it to Tommy Booth, but the Bluemoon website credits it to Joe Royle. The figures in this table assign the goal to Royle.)		
Tony Coleman	England	Winger	1967–1969	104	16		
Joe Corrigan	England	Goalkeeper	1967–1983	603	0	3	
Francis Lee	England	Forward	1967–1974	330	148	1	
Willie Donachie	Scotland	Full back	1970–1980	436	2		
Tony Towers	England	Midfielder	1969–1974	165	12		
Rodney Marsh	England	Forward	1972–1975	152	47		
Kenny Clements	England	Defender	1971–1979; 1985–1988	282	2	1	
Peter Barnes	England	Winger	1974–1979; 1987	161	22		
Asa Hartford	Scotland	Midfielder	1974–1979; 1981–1984	321	36	1	
Joe Royle	England	Forward	1974–1977	124	32		
Dennis Tueart	England	Forward	1974–1978; 1980–1983	275	109		
Dave Watson	England	Centre back	1975–1979	188	6	1	
Paul Power	England	Defender / Midfielder	1975–1986	444 (Note: Sometimes this number is reported as 445. The discrepancy lies in the old First Division One league game played at home against Coventry City on 13 December 1975. The cited M.E.N. source for Power's total appearances tally aligns itself with this team selection in which Power plays no part in a match where no substitutes were used. The main book source for this table reports (p. 419) Power as being a substitute who replaced Tommy Booth.)	36	2	
Gary Owen	England	Midfielder	1976–1979	124	23		
Brian Kidd	England	Forward	1977–1979	128	57		
Ray Ranson	England	Defender	1978–1984; 1993	235	1		
Nicky Reid	England	Defender	1978–1982; 1982–1986	262	2		
Tommy Caton	England	Defender	1979–1983	198	8	1	
Bobby McDonald	Scotland	Defender	1980–1983	112	16		
Kevin Reeves	England	Forward	1980–1983	158	39		
Kevin Bond	England	Defender	1981–1984	124	12	1	
Steve Kinsey	England	Forward	1981–1986	115	18		
Alex Williams	England	Goalkeeper	1981–1985	125	0		
Clive Wilson	England	Defender	1981–1987	126	11		
Graham Baker	England	Midfielder	1982–1987	138	21		
Andy May	England	Midfielder	1982–1987	174	8		
Paul Simpson	England	Forward	1982–1988	155	24		
Mick McCarthy	Republic of Ireland	Defender	1983–1987	163	3	1	
Neil McNab	Scotland	Midfielder	1983–1990	266	19	2	
Ian Brightwell	England	Defender / Midfielder	1986–1998	382	19		
Steve Redmond	England	Defender	1986–1992	287	7	1	
David White	England	Forward	1986–1994	341	96		
Paul Lake	England	Midfielder	1987–1992	134	11		
Andy Hinchcliffe	England	Defender	1987–1990	139	11		
Andy Dibble	Wales	Goalkeeper	1988–1997	141	0		
Ian Bishop	England	Midfielder	1989; 1998–2001	117	7		
Colin Hendry	Scotland	Defender	1989–1991	77	10	1	
Peter Reid	England	Midfielder	1989–1993	114	2		
Niall Quinn	Republic of Ireland	Forward	1990–1996	243	78	1	
Tony Coton	England	Goalkeeper	1990–1995	194	0	2	
Andy Hill	England	Defender	1990–1995	113	6		
Keith Curle	England	Defender	1991–1996	204	13		
Michel Vonk	Netherlands	Defender	1991–1995	103	6		
Mike Sheron	England	Forward	1991–1994	119	28		
Garry Flitcroft	England	Midfielder	1992–1996	141	15	1	
Terry Phelan	Republic of Ireland	Defender	1992–1995	122	2		
Steve Lomas	Northern Ireland	Midfielder	1993–1997	137	11		
Richard Edghill	England	Defender	1993–2001	210	1		
Uwe Rösler	Germany	Forward	1994–1998	176 (Note: Sometimes this number is reported as 177. The discrepancy lies in the Second Round League Cup tie played away at Barnet on 20 September 1994. The cited M.E.N. source for Rösler's total appearances tally aligns itself with this team selection in which Rösler plays no part in this match. The main book source for this table reports Rösler as being in the starting line-up for this game instead of Foster (p. 457). In this version, Rösler (not Vonk) was substituted off to be replaced by Quinn, while Vonk was substituted off to be replaced by Foster who was not in the starting line-up.)	64	1	
Nicky Summerbee	England	Defender / Midfielder	1994–1997	156	10		
Giorgi Kinkladze	Georgia	Midfielder	1995–1998	121	22	2	
Kit Symons	Wales	Defender	1995–1998	139	4		
Michael Brown	England	Midfielder	1995–2000	110	4	1	
Jeff Whitley	Northern Ireland	Midfielder	1996–2001	141	8		
Kevin Horlock	Northern Ireland	Midfielder	1996–2003	232	42		

Last updated: 21 August 2015.
Source: James, Gary (2006). Manchester City – The Complete Record. Derby: Breedon. ISBN 1-85983-512-0.; plus citations in "Refs." column for individual aspects of player data of various players.

=== Contemporary players ===
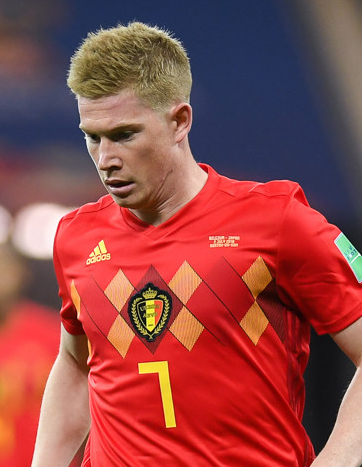
Kevin De Bruyne has won 19 titles as a City player; has a record equalling four club player of the year awards; and is the club's leading assist provider.

Player	Nat.	Club career	Position	League		Cups		Other		Total		PotY	Refs.
Player	Nat.	Club career	Position	A	G	A	G	A	G	Apps.	Goals	PotY	Refs.
Paul Dickov	Scotland	1996–2002; 2006–2008	Forward	175	35	25	6			200	41		(Note: Gary James, Manchester City – The Complete Record)
Gerard Wiekens	Netherlands	1997–2003	Defender	185	10	27	0	1	0	213	10	1	
Nicky Weaver	England	1998–2007	Goalkeeper	175	0	31	0	1	0	207	0		
Shaun Goater	Bermuda	1998–2003	Forward	187	85	25	18			212	103	1	
Danny Tiatto	Australia	1998–2004	Defender	139	3	14	1	5	0	158 (Note: Sometimes this number is reported as 159. The discrepancy lies in the Football League Division One home game played against Fulham on 16 January 2000. The cited Soccerbase source for Tiatto's total appearances tally reports Tiatto as having played no substitute role in this game for which it reports no substitutes were utilised by Manchester City. The main book source used for many of the statistics depicted in this article aligns itself with this team sheet report in which Tiatto replaces Mark Kennedy in the only substitution done by the home team, giving him one additional appearance. Also note that the five "other appearances" by Tiatto consist of four appearances in the 2003–04 UEFA Cup competition and one appearance in the 1998–99 Football League Trophy (then known as the Auto Windscreens Shield for sponsorship purposes).)	4	1	
Shaun Wright-Phillips	England	1999–2005; 2008–2011	Midfielder	217	35	34	7	24	5	275	47	1	
Steve Howey	England	2000–2003	Defender	94	11	9	0			103	11		
Richard Dunne	Republic of Ireland	2000–2009	Defender	296	8	38	0	18	0	352	8 (Note: The following game recorded by Soccerbase incorrectly credits a goal scored by Richard Dunne to another player: Charlton Athletic 2–2 Manchester City (2 April 2005) – Soccerbase mistakenly identifies the goal scored by Dunne as an own goal by defender Hermann Hreidarsson. This goal was also initially attributed by the majority of the sporting press to Hreidarsson, but it was later reassigned to Dunne by the PL 'Dubious Goals Committee' (see "Comments" at end of the 11v11 match report). This total has been editorially adjusted for this article accordingly.)	4	
Ali Benarbia	Algeria	2001–2003	Midfielder	71	11	7	0			78	11	1	
Sun Jihai	China	2002–2008	Defender	130	3	16	0	5	1	151	4		
Nicolas Anelka	France	2002–2005	Forward	89	37	9	4	5	4	103	45 (Note: The following game recorded by Soccerbase incorrectly credits a goal scored by another player to Nicolas Anelka: Fulham 2–2 Manchester City, 20 September 2003 – Soccerbase mistakenly identifies the 46th minute own goal scored by Fulham defender Zat Knight as a goal scored by Nicolas Anelka. This deflected goal was initially attributed by the majority of the sporting press to Anelka, but was later reassigned to be a Knight own goal by the PL 'Dubious Goals Committee' (see "Comments" at end of the 11v11 match report). This total has been editorially adjusted for this article accordingly.)		
Sylvain Distin	France	2002–2007	Defender	178	5	23	1	5	0	206	6	1	
Joey Barton	England	2003–2007	Midfielder	130	15	18	2	5	0	153	17		
Antoine Sibierski	France	2003–2006	Midfielder	92	11	14	3	1	1	107	15		
David James	England	2004–2006	Goalkeeper	93	0	7	0			100	0		
Nedum Onuoha	England	2004–2012	Defender	95	3	14	1	7	1	116	5		
Darius Vassell	England	2005–2009	Forward	103	17	15	4	6	1	124	22		
Stephen Ireland	Republic of Ireland	2005–2010	Midfielder	138	16	24	4	14	3	176	23	1	
Micah Richards	England	2005–2014	Defender	179	7	33	3	33	0	245	10 (Note: The following game recorded by Soccerbase incorrectly credits a goal scored by Micah Richards to another player: Man City 4–2 Arsenal (12 September 2009) – Soccerbase mistakenly identifies the goal scored by Richards as an own goal by goalkeeper Manuel Almunia. This goal was also initially attributed by the majority of the sporting press to Almunia, but was later reassigned to Richards by the PL 'Dubious Goals Committee' (see "Comments" at end of the 11v11 match report). This total has been editorially adjusted for this article accordingly.)		
Joe Hart	England	2006–2017	Goalkeeper	266	0	19	0	63	0	348	0		
Vincent Kompany	Belgium	2008–2019	Defender	265	18	36	1	59	1	360	20	1	
Pablo Zabaleta	Argentina	2008–2017	Defender	230	9	48	2	55	1	284	10	1	
Nigel de Jong	Netherlands	2009–2012	Midfielder	104	1	17	1	16	0	137	2		
Kolo Touré	Ivory Coast	2009–2013	Defender	82	2	12	1	8	0	102	3		
Gareth Barry	England	2009–2013	Midfielder	132	6	24	2	19	0	175	8		
Carlos Tevez	Argentina	2009–2013	Forward	113	58	21	14	14	1	148	73 (Note: The following game recorded by Soccerbase incorrectly credits a goal scored by another player to Carlos Tevez: Newcastle United 1–3 Manchester City (26 December 2010) – Soccerbase mistakenly identifies the own goal scored by Newcastle defender Fabricio Coloccini as a second goal by Carlos Tevez. This goal was initially attributed by the majority of the sporting press to Tevez, but was reassigned almost five months later to be a Coloccini own goal by the PL 'Dubious Goals Committee' (see "Comments" at end of the 11v11 match report). This total has been editorially adjusted for this article accordingly.)	1	
Joleon Lescott	England	2009–2014	Defender	107	7	32	1	21	1	160	9		
David Silva	Spain	2010–2020	Midfielder	309	60	53	6	74	11	436	77	1	
Yaya Touré	Ivory Coast	2010–2018	Midfielder	230	62	34	11	52	9	316	82 (Note: The following games recorded by Soccerbase incorrectly credit goals scored by Yaya Touré to other players: (1) West Ham 1–3 Man City (11 December 2010) – Soccerbase mistakenly identifies one of the 2 goals scored by Touré as an own goal by goalkeeper Rob Green. (2) Man City 1–2 Everton (20 December 2010) – Soccerbase mistakenly identifies the goal scored by Touré as an own goal by defender Phil Jagielka. (3) Man City 4–0 Newcastle (30 March 2013) – Soccerbase mistakenly identifies the goal scored by Touré as an own goal by defender James Perch. All three of these goals were initially attributed by the majority of the sporting press as own goals scored by the above mentioned players, but in every case they were later reassigned to Touré by the PL 'Dubious Goals Committee' (see "Comments" at the end of each of the three 11v11 match reports). This total has been editorially adjusted for this article accordingly.)	1	
Aleksandar Kolarov	Serbia	2010–2017	Defender	165	11	36	6	46	4	247	21		
James Milner	England	2010–2015	Midfielder	147	13	26	3	30	2	203 (Note: According to the 5 individual seasons (2010–2011 to 2014–2015) of Soccerbase records for James Milner, he has played in 20 UEFA Champions League matches (4, 2, 6, 8 for seasons 2011–2012 through 2014–2015 respectively); 7 Europa League matches (5 in 2010–2011 and 2 in 2011–2012); and 3 Community Shield finals (in 2011, 2012 and 2014). This yields a total of 30 (20+7+3) appearances that should be included in his total "Other appearances" tally. As of the closed season 2015 this total (Retrieved 27 July 2015) was erroneously showing as 28, 2 less than the same Soccerbase records indicate on an individual season basis, so it has been editorially adjusted for this article accordingly.)	18		
Edin Džeko	Bosnia and Herzegovina	2011–2015	Forward	130	50	25	15	34	7	189 (Note: According to the 5 individual seasons (2010–2011 to 2014–2015) of Soccerbase records for Edin Džeko, he has played in 24 UEFA Champions League matches (5, 6, 7, 6 for seasons 2011–2012 through 2014–2015 respectively); 7 Europa League matches (4 in 2010–2011 and 3 in 2011–2012); and 3 Community Shield finals (in 2011, 2012 and 2014). This yields a total of 34 (24+7+3) appearances that should be included in his total "Other appearances" tally. As of the closed season 2015 this total (Retrieved 27 July 2015) was erroneously showing as 32, 2 less than the same Soccerbase records indicate on an individual season basis, so it has been editorially adjusted for this article accordingly.)	72		
Gaël Clichy	France	2011–2017	Defender	138	2	26	1	39	0	203	3		
Sergio Agüero	Argentina	2011–2021	Forward	275	184	44	31	71	45	390	260	2	
Samir Nasri	France	2011–2017	Midfielder	129	18	15	5	32	4	176	27		
Jesús Navas	Spain	2013–2017	Midfielder	123	4	28	4	32	0	182	8		
Fernandinho	Brazil	2013–2022	Midfielder	264	20	42	3	77	3	383	26		
Martín Demichelis	Argentina	2013–2016	Defender	78	3	13	0	15	1	106	4		
Fernando	Brazil	2014–2017	Midfielder	64	4	16	0	22	0	102	4		
Raheem Sterling	England	2015–2022	Forward	225	91	45	15	69	25	339	131		
Nicolás Otamendi	Argentina	2015–2020	Defender	136	8	32	2	42	1	210	11		
Kevin De Bruyne	Belgium	2015–2025	Midfielder	285	72	60	20	77	16	422	108	4	
John Stones	England	2016–2026	Defender	180	10	46	3	69	6	295	19		
Leroy Sané	Germany	2016–2020	Forward	90	25	22	8	23	6	135	39		
İlkay Gündoğan	Germany	2016–2023 2024–2025	Midfielder	221	45	52	6	85	14	358	65		
Oleksandr Zinchenko	Ukraine	2016–2022	Defender	76	0	26	2	26	0	128	2		
Gabriel Jesus	Brazil	2017–2022	Forward	159	58	37	17	40	20	236	95		
Ederson	Brazil	2017–2025	Goalkeeper	276	0	12	0	84	0	372	0		
Bernardo Silva	Portugal	2017–2026	Midfielder	304	45	59	13	97	18	460	76	1	
Kyle Walker	England	2017–2025	Defender	212	3	46	2	61	1	319	6		
Phil Foden	England	2017–	Midfielder	225	68	65	18	79	24	369	110	1	
Aymeric Laporte	Spain	2018–2023	Defender	121	8	26	2	33	2	180	12		
Riyad Mahrez	Algeria	2018–2023	Forward	145	43	45	19	46	16	236	78		
Rodri	Spain	2019–2026	Midfielder	196	23	37	2	65	3	298	28		
João Cancelo	Portugal	2019–2024	Defender	98	5	30	1	55	3	154	9		(Note: Cancelo "Joao Cancelo". Statcity.)
Rúben Dias	Portugal	2020–	Defender	170	5	23	0	62	1	255	6	1	
Nathan Aké	Netherlands	2020–2026	Defender	107	6	30	3	40	1	177	10		
Jack Grealish	England	2021–	Midfielder	94	12	23	3	40	2	157	17		
Julián Álvarez	Argentina	2022–2024	Forward	67	20	14	5	22	11	103	36		
Erling Haaland	Norway	2022–	Forward	133	112	19	13	47	37	199	162	1	
Manuel Akanji	Switzerland	2022–2026	Defender	85	2	16	0	35	3	136	5		
Rico Lewis	England	2022–	Defender	69	3	22	3	25	1	116	7		
Joško Gvardiol	Croatia	2023–	Defender	83	11	12	1	27	1	121	13	1	
Jérémy Doku	Belgium	2023–	Midfielder	88	11	19	7	24	4	131	22		
Matheus Nunes	Portugal	2023–	Defender	76	2	17	2	27	1	120	5		
Nico O'Reilly	England	2023–	Defender	43	7	19	6	12	1	74	14	1	

Last updated: 30 May 2026.
Source: https://www.statcity.co.uk/Players

=== Club captains ===
This is a list of City's official club captains, who are currently appointed via a vote of players and staff. Other players (vice-captains) have led the team on the pitch when the club captain is not playing or not available. Some players have been made captain on a one-off basis to celebrate or commemorate an event, e.g. Oleksandr Zinchenko captained the team in their 2021–22 FA Cup fifth round tie at Peterborough United in support of his country during the 2022 Russian invasion of Ukraine.

Years	Pos.	Captain
1904–1906	FW	(Wales) Billy Meredith
1906–1914	FW	(Wales) Lot Jones
1914–1919	No competitive football due to the First World War	
1919–1923	DF	(England) Eli Fletcher
1923–1925	DF	(England) Max Woosnam
1926–1928	MF	(Scotland) Charlie Pringle
1928–1932	MF	(Scotland) Jimmy McMullan
1932–1935	DF	(England) Sam Cowan
1935–1936	MF	(Scotland) Matt Busby
1937–1939	MF	(Scotland) Les McDowall

Years	Pos.	Captain
1939–1946	No competitive football due to the Second World War	
1946–1947	GK	(England) Frank Swift
1947–1950	DF	(England) Eric Westwood
1950–1957	DF	(England) Roy Paul
1957–1961	MF	(England) Ken Barnes
1961–1964	DF	(England) Bill Leivers
1965–1967	FW	(Northern Ireland) Johnny Crossan
1967–1974	DF	(England) Tony Book
1974–1975	MF	(England) Colin Bell
1975–1976	DF	(England) Mike Doyle

Years	Pos.	Captain
1976–1979	DF	(England) David Watson
1979–1986	DF/MF	(England) Paul Power
1986–1988	DF	(England) Kenny Clements
1988–1992	DF	(England) Steve Redmond
1992–1993	DF	(Republic of Ireland) Terry Phelan
1993–1996	DF	(England) Keith Curle
1996–1998	DF	(Wales) Kit Symons
1998	MF	(England) Jamie Pollock
1998–2000	DF	(Scotland) Andy Morrison
2000–2001	DF/MF	(Norway) Alf-Inge Haaland

Years	Pos.	Captain
2001–2002	DF	(England) Stuart Pearce
2002–2003	MF	(Algeria) Ali Benarbia
2003–2006	DF	(France) Sylvain Distin
2006–2009	DF	(Republic of Ireland) Richard Dunne
2009–2010	DF	(Ivory Coast) Kolo Touré
2010–2011	FW	(Argentina) Carlos Tevez
2011–2019	DF	(Belgium) Vincent Kompany
2019–2020	MF	(Spain) David Silva
2020–2022	MF	(Brazil) Fernandinho
2022–2023	MF	(Germany) İlkay Gündoğan

Years	Pos.	Captain
2023–2025	DF	(England) Kyle Walker
2025	MF	(Belgium) Kevin De Bruyne
2025–2026	MF	(Portugal) Bernardo Silva
2026–	DF	(Portugal) Rúben Dias

== Most prolific goalscorers ==
The players who have scored the most goals in total during their entire club career can be determined by sorting on the appropriate column in either of the above tables. Below is an additional sortable list of the most prolific Manchester City strikers' acumen in front of goal based on their best individual seasons for the club. Current players are highlighted in blue.

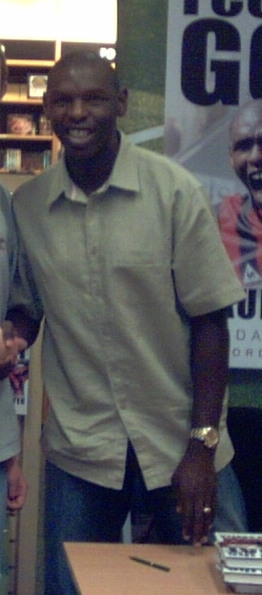
Shaun Goater appeared 211 times for City between 1998 and 2003, scoring 103 goals. In season 2001–02 he scored 32 goals making him 1 of only 6 players to have scored 30+ goals in a season since World War 2.

Manchester City players who have scored 30 or more goals for the club in a single season
Player	Nat.	Season	No. of goals	No. of matches	Avg. goals per match	Total goals for club	Refs.
Billy Meredith	Wales	1898–99	30	34	0.88	151	(Note: Gary James, Manchester City – The Complete Record, p. 283.)
Billie Gillespie	England	1902–03	30	33	0.91	132	(Note: Gary James, Manchester City – The Complete Record, p. 291.)
Tommy Browell	England	1920–21	31	43	0.72	139	(Note: Gary James, Manchester City – The Complete Record, p. 319.)
Frank Roberts	England	1924–25	32	39	0.82	130	(Note: Gary James, Manchester City – The Complete Record, p. 327.)
Frank Roberts	England	1925–26	30	45	0.67	130	(Note: Gary James, Manchester City – The Complete Record, p. 329.)
Tommy Johnson	England	1928–29	38	39	0.97	166	
Tommy Tait	England	1929–30	31	34	0.91	46	(Note: Gary James, Manchester City – The Complete Record, p. 337.)
Dave Halliday	Scotland	1931–32	32	45	0.71	51	(Note: Gary James, Manchester City – The Complete Record, p. 341.)
Peter Doherty	Republic of Ireland	1936–37	32	45	0.71	80	(Note: Gary James, Manchester City – The Complete Record, p. 351.)
Alex Harley	Scotland	1962–63	32	49	0.65	32	(Note: Gary James, Manchester City – The Complete Record, p. 393.)
Derek Kevan	England	1963–64	36	46	0.78	56	(Note: Gary James, Manchester City – The Complete Record, p. 395.)
Francis Lee	England	1971–72	35	46	0.76	148	
Shaun Goater	Bermuda	2001–02	32	46	0.70	103	
Sergio Agüero	Argentina	2011–12	30	48	0.63	260	
Sergio Agüero	Argentina	2014–15	32	42	0.76	260	
Sergio Agüero	Argentina	2016–17	33	45	0.73	260	
Sergio Agüero	Argentina	2017–18	30	39	0.77	260	
Sergio Agüero	Argentina	2018–19	32	46	0.70	260	
Raheem Sterling	England	2019–20	31	52	0.60	131	
Erling Haaland	Norway	2022–23	52	53	0.98	162	
Erling Haaland	Norway	2023–24	38	43	0.88	162	
Erling Haaland	Norway	2024–25	34	48	0.71	162	
Erling Haaland	Norway	2025–26	38	52	0.73	162	

Last updated: 19 May 2026.
Source: James, Gary (2006). Manchester City – The Complete Record. Derby: Breedon. ISBN 1-85983-512-0.; plus citations in "Refs." column for individual player data.

== Most England caps ==
The following is a list of the most capped England internationals to play for Manchester City. The list is initially presented in the chronological order of the dates each player made his debut for England at full international level but can be sorted based on the contents of the fourth column to display the players in order of most appearances for their country. The list includes all ten of the most capped players who played for England while also actively playing for the club (just sort the list instead based on the contents of the third column). Players who won all of their England caps playing for Manchester City are indicated in bold font. Internationals with no caps won while playing at Manchester City are indicated in italics. Players who are currently internationally active players are highlighted in blue.

Most capped England internationals to play for Manchester City (minimum 17 England caps)
Player		Caps while at club	Total caps *	Goals	Clean sheets	First capped	Last capped	England career span	Refs.
**Eric Brook**	FW	18	18	10	––	19 October 1929	17 November 1937	8 years, 29 days	
**Frank Swift**	GK	19	19	0	9	28 September 1946	18 May 1949	2 years, 232 days	
**Colin Bell**	MF	48	48(3)	9	––	22 May 1968	30 October 1975	7 years, 161 days	
**Francis Lee**	FW	27	27(0)	10	––	11 December 1968	29 April 1972	3 years, 140 days	
Mick Channon	FW	1	46(2)	21	––	11 October 1972	7 September 1977	4 years, 331 days	
Dave Watson	DF	30	65(2)	4	––	3 April 1974	2 June 1982	8 years, 60 days	
Trevor Francis	FW	10	52 (10)	12	––	9 February 1977	23 April 1986	9 years, 73 days	
Peter Barnes	FW	14	22(4)	4	––	16 November 1977	25 May 1982	4 years, 190 days	
Peter Beardsley	MF	0	59(13)	9	––	29 January 1986	23 May 1996	10 years, 115 days	
Stuart Pearce	DF	0	78(4)	5	––	19 May 1987	8 September 1999	12 years, 112 days	
David Seaman	GK	0	75(3)	0	40	16 November 1988	16 October 2002	13 years, 334 days	
Steve McManaman	MF	0	37 (12)	3	––	16 November 1994	6 October 2001	6 years, 324 days	
Robbie Fowler	FW	0	26 (15)	7	––	27 March 1996	15 June 2002	6 years, 80 days	
David James	GK	13	53 (10)	0	21	29 March 1997	27 June 2010	13 years, 90 days	
Frank Lampard	MF	0	106 (17)	29	––	10 October 1999	24 June 2014	14 years, 257 days	
Gareth Barry	MF	24	53 (12)	2	––	31 May 2000	26 May 2012	11 years, 361 days	
Danny Mills	DF	0	19 (8)	0	––	25 May 2001	18 February 2004	2 years, 269 days	
Owen Hargreaves	MF	0	42 (25)	0	––	15 August 2001	28 May 2008	6 years, 287 days	
Wayne Bridge	DF	4	36 (15)	1	––	13 February 2002	14 November 2009	7 years, 274 days	
Darius Vassell	FW	0	22 (16)	6	––	13 February 2002	24 June 2004	2 years, 132 days	
Shaun Wright-Phillips	MF	20	36 (21)	6	––	18 August 2004	12 October 2010	6 years, 55 days	
Joleon Lescott	DF	21	28(6)	1	––	13 October 2007	26 March 2013	5 years, 164 days	
Joe Hart	GK	64	75(5)	0	43	1 June 2008	14 November 2017	9 years, 166 days	
James Milner	MF	42	61 (25)	1	––	12 August 2009	11 June 2016	6 years, 304 days	
Kyle Walker	DF	66	95(9)	1	––	12 November 2011	24 March 2025	13 years, 132 days	
Raheem Sterling	MF	61	82(10)	20	––	14 November 2012	10 December 2022	10 years, 26 days	
John Stones	DF	80	94(11)	3	––	30 May 2014	15 July 2026	12 years, 46 days	
Fabian Delph	MF	14	20 (5)	0	––	3 September 2014	9 June 2019	4 years, 279 days	
**Phil Foden**	MF	49	49(15)	4	––	5 September 2020	31 March 2026	5 years, 207 days	
Jack Grealish	MF	27	39(21)	4	––	8 September 2020	13 October 2024	4 years, 35 days	
Kalvin Phillips	MF	8	31(8)	1	––	8 September 2020	20 November 2023	3 years, 73 days	
Marc Guéhi	DF	15	41(5)	1	––	26 March 2022	6 October 2026	4 years, 194 days	
Elliot Anderson	MF	6	23(3)	––	––	6 September 2025	15 November 2026	1 year, 70 days	

* Parenthetical number represents total substitute appearances included in larger total appearances tally for those players for whom substitution is applicable.

Last updated: 15 November 2026.
Source: "Who are City's most-capped England internationals?". Manchester City F.C. 23 April 2015. Archived from the original on 12 September 2015.; plus citations in "Refs." column for individual player data.

== Player of the Year awards ==
Each season since the end of the 1966–67 season, the members of the Manchester City Official Supporters Club have voted by ballot to choose the player on the team they feel is the most worthy of recognition for his performances during that season. The following table lists all of the recipients of this award since its inception. All of these players are listed in italics font in the pair of tables presented in the main section of this article.

Year	Winner
1967	(England) Tony Book
1968	(England) Colin Bell
1969	(England) Glyn Pardoe
1970	(England) Francis Lee
1971	(England) Mike Doyle
1972	(England) Mike Summerbee
1973	(England) Mike Summerbee
1974	(England) Mike Doyle
1975	(England) Alan Oakes
1976	(England) Joe Corrigan

Year	Winner
1977	(England) David Watson
1978	(England) Joe Corrigan
1979	(Scotland) Asa Hartford
1980	(England) Joe Corrigan
1981	(England) Paul Power
1982	(England) Tommy Caton
1983	(England) Kevin Bond
1984	(Republic of Ireland) Mick McCarthy
1985	(England) Paul Power
1986	(England) Kenny Clements

Year	Winner
1987	(Scotland) Neil McNab
1988	(England) Steve Redmond
1989	(Scotland) Neil McNab
1990	(Scotland) Colin Hendry
1991	(Republic of Ireland) Niall Quinn
1992	(England) Tony Coton
1993	(England) Garry Flitcroft
1994	(England) Tony Coton
1995	(Germany) Uwe Rösler
1996	(Georgia (country)) Giorgi Kinkladze

Year	Winner
1997	(Georgia (country)) Giorgi Kinkladze
1998	(England) Michael Brown
1999	(Netherlands) Gerard Wiekens
2000	(Bermuda) Shaun Goater
2001	(Australia) Danny Tiatto
2002	(Algeria) Ali Benarbia
2003	(France) Sylvain Distin
2004	(England) Shaun Wright-Phillips
2005	(Republic of Ireland) Richard Dunne
2006	(Republic of Ireland) Richard Dunne

Year	Winner
2007	(Republic of Ireland) Richard Dunne
2008	(Republic of Ireland) Richard Dunne
2009	(Republic of Ireland) Stephen Ireland
2010	(Argentina) Carlos Tevez
2011	(Belgium) Vincent Kompany
2012	(Argentina) Sergio Agüero
2013	(Argentina) Pablo Zabaleta
2014	(Ivory Coast) Yaya Touré
2015	(Argentina) Sergio Agüero
2016	(Belgium) Kevin De Bruyne

Year	Winner
2017	(Spain) David Silva
2018	(Belgium) Kevin De Bruyne
2019	(Portugal) Bernardo Silva
2020	(Belgium) Kevin De Bruyne
2021	(Portugal) Rúben Dias
2022	(Belgium) Kevin De Bruyne
2023	(Norway) Erling Haaland
2024	(England) Phil Foden
2025	(Croatia) Joško Gvardiol
2026	(England) Nico O'Reilly

== Player of the month awards ==
The club have publicly awarded a Player of the Month award since the start of the 2007–08 season. Titled the Thomas Cook Player of the Month award until the end of the 2008–09 season it has been known as the Etihad Player of the Month award since then to the present day. Since 2010–11 it has been awarded by means of a public poll of registered "cityzen" users of the mancity.com website each month. Before that it was by a poll of members of the clubs official supporters club.

To date, the award has been made on 164 occasions to 63 individual players. The player awarded the most times is Kevin De Bruyne. De Bruyne is also the only player to date to have been awarded it four times in a single season (2015–16). The player with the most consecutive awards is Bernardo Silva who won it three times between September and November 2021.

=== Players with the most awards ===
Current players at the club are highlighted in bold.

Player	No. of awards	Month of first award	Month of last award
(Belgium) Kevin De Bruyne	17	Sep. 15	Jan. 24
(Argentina) Sergio Agüero	12	Feb. 12	Jan. 20
(Spain) David Silva	10	Oct. 10	Mar. 18
(Algeria) Riyad Mahrez	8	Oct. 18	Jan. 23
(Norway) **Erling Haaland**	8	Aug. 22	Sep. 26
(England) Raheem Sterling	5	Aug. 16	Oct. 19
(Portugal) Bernardo Silva	5	Dec. 18	Nov. 21
(Belgium) Vincent Kompany	5	Dec. 08	Feb. 16
(England) Joe Hart	5	Feb. 08	Mar. 15
(England) **Phil Foden**	5	Dec. 23	Nov. 25
(Bosnia and Herzegovina) Edin Džeko	4	Jan. 11	Jan. 14
(Argentina) Carlos Tevez	4	Dec. 09	Mar. 13
(Ivory Coast) Yaya Touré	4	Apr. 11	Dec. 16
(England) James Milner	3	Nov. 11	Jan. 15
(France) Samir Nasri	3	Mar. 12	Nov. 13
(Argentina) Pablo Zabaleta	3	Jan. 09	Jan. 13
(Uzbekistan) **Abdukodir Khusanov**	3	Feb. 25	Mar. 26
(England) **Nico O'Reilly**	3	Apr. 25	Apr. 26
12 players	2	–	
33 players	1	–	

Last updated: 7 November 2026.
Source: http://mancity.com

== Former Manchester City players and managers inducted into Halls of Fame ==
A number of former Manchester City players and managers have been inducted into the club's own Hall of Fame (which was inaugurated in 2004) as well as the national football Halls of Fame of both Scotland (also inaugurated in 2004) and England / Wales (inaugurated in 2002). All of the honoured inductees in one of these three football halls of fame (listed below), who were former players at the club with more than one hundred appearances, are listed in bold font in the pair of tables presented in the main section of this article.

=== Manchester City Hall of Fame ===
The following former Manchester City players and managers are inductees in the Manchester City F.C. Hall of Fame and are listed according to the year of their induction:

Inductees in MCFC Hall of Fame
Year of induction	Player	Position	Role at MCFC	Years in role at MCFC	Notes
Year of induction	Manchester City players who were the inaugural inductees in October 2004				
2004	(Wales) Billy Meredith	right winger	player	1894–1906; 1921–1924	also see NFM Hall of Fame
2004	(England) Tommy Johnson	centre forward & inside left	player	1919–1930	
2004	(England) Eric Brook	left winger	player	1928–1939	
2004	(England) Frank Swift	goalkeeper	player	1933–1949	also see NFM Hall of Fame
2004	(Republic of Ireland) Peter Doherty	inside left	player	1936–1945	also see NFM Hall of Fame
2004	(Wales) Roy Clarke	left winger	player	1947–1958	**Lifetime achievement award**
2004	(Germany) Bert Trautmann, OBE	goalkeeper	player	1949–1964	also see NFM Hall of Fame
2004	(Wales) Roy Paul	half back	player	1950–1957	
2004	(England) Mike Summerbee	centre forward & right winger	player	1965–1975	also see NFM Hall of Fame
2004	(England) Tony Book	right back	player manager interim mgr.	1966–1974; 1974–1979; 1973; 1980; 1989; 1993	
2004	(England) Colin Bell, MBE	attacking midfielder	player	1966–1979	also see NFM Hall of Fame
2004	(England) Francis Lee, CBE	forward	player chairman	1967–1974; 1994–1998	also see NFM Hall of Fame
2004	(England) Joe Corrigan	goalkeeper	player	1967–1983	
2004	(England) Paul Lake	midfielder / defender	player	1987–1996	
2004	(Republic of Ireland) Niall Quinn, (Honorary) MBE	forward	player	1990–1996	also see NFM Hall of Fame
	Manchester City players and teams inducted since 2004				
2005	(England) Sam Cowan	centre half	player manager	1924–1935; 1946–1947	
2005	(England) Ken Barnes	wing half	player	1950–1961	**Lifetime achievement award**
2005	(England) Alan Oakes	midfielder	player	1958–1976	
2005	(England) Joe Mercer, OBE	left half	manager	1965–1971	**Outstanding achievement award** also see NFM Hall of Fame
2005	(England) Malcolm Allison	centre half	assistant mgr. manager	1965–1971; 1971–1973; 1979–1980	**Outstanding achievement award** also see NFM Hall of Fame
2006	(England) Ernie Toseland	right winger	player	1928–1938	
2006	(England) Johnny Hart	inside forward	player manager	1947–1960; 1973	**Lifetime achievement award**
2006	(England) Manchester City 1956; FA Cup-winning team	not applicable			en masse induction
2006	(England) Mike Doyle	centre half & defensive midfielder	player	1965–1978	
2006	(Bermuda) Shaun Goater	forward	player	1998–2003	**Cult hero award**
2008	(England) Fred Tilson	centre forward	player	1928–1939	
2008	(England) Neil Young	inside left & left winger	player	1961–1972	
2008	(England) Alex Williams, MBE	goalkeeper	player	1980–1986	**Lifetime achievement award**
2009	(Germany) Uwe Rösler	forward	player	1994–1998	

Last updated: 1 January 2016.
Source: list of MCFC Hall of Fame inductees

=== National Football Museum Hall of Fame ===
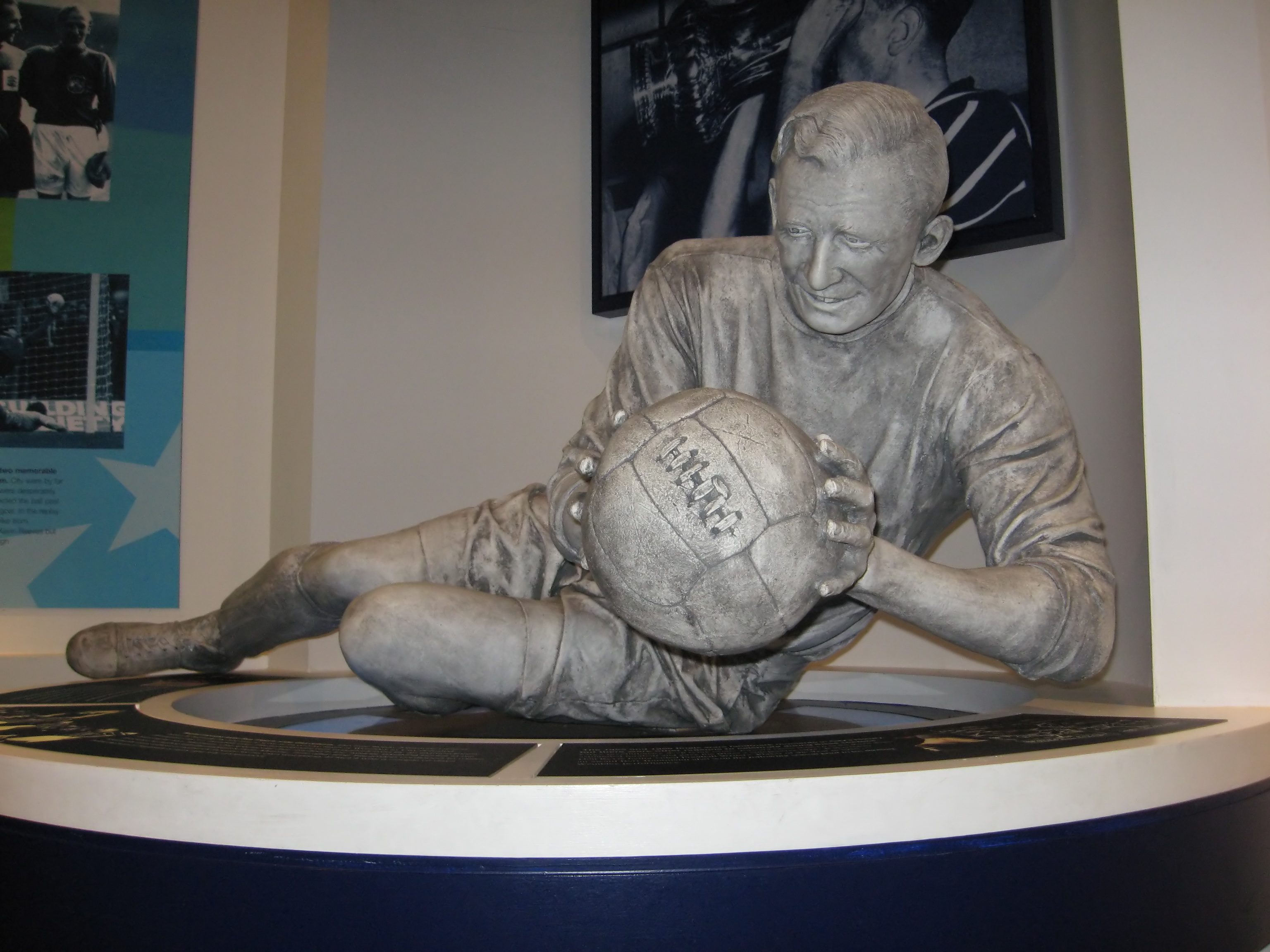
Former German POW Bernhard Carl "Bert" Trautmann kept goal for the club between 1949 and 1964. Famous for having played through to the end of the 1956 FA Cup final despite sustaining a broken neck, he has now acquired an almost legendary status at the club. This sculpture of him at the Manchester City Museum celebrates his prowess.

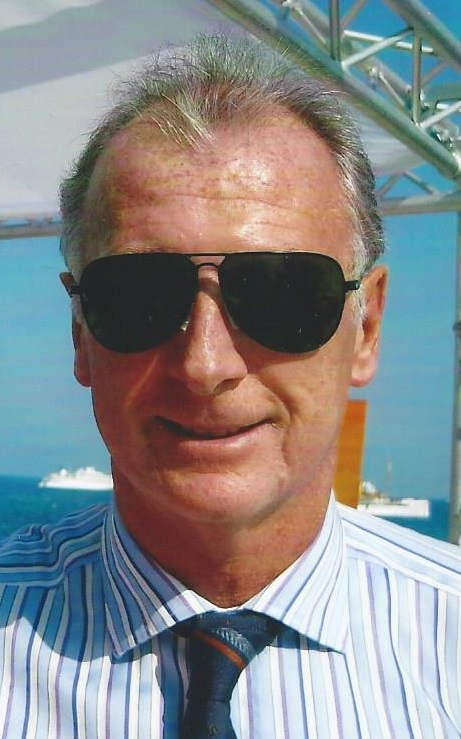
Trevor Francis will always be remembered in Britain as the first £1 million player. £1.18m is the actual amount Nottingham Forest paid Birmingham City in 1979. Two years later he moved to Maine Road for an even larger fee, but his time spent wearing sky blue was plagued with injuries and he was sold to Sampdoria by a cash-strapped City at the end of his first season. City fans that saw him play (when not injured) rate his skill and flair as highly as any player that has worn the club's shirt.

The following former Manchester City players and managers are inductees in the English Football Hall of Fame (a.k.a. the National Football Museum Hall of Fame) and are listed according to the year of their induction within the various categories:

Inductees in NFM Hall of Fame
Year of induction	Player	Position	Role at MCFC	Years in role at MCFC
Year of induction	Players with Manchester City backgrounds inducted to date			
2002	(Republic of Ireland) Peter Doherty	inside left	player	1936–1945
2002	(Scotland) Denis Law, CBE	forward & midfielder	player	1960–1961; 1973–1974
2002	(England) Kevin Keegan, OBE	forward	manager	2001–2005
2003	(Denmark) Peter Schmeichel, MBE	goalkeeper	player	2002–2003
2003	(England) Alan Ball, MBE	attacking midfielder	manager	1995–1996
2005	(Germany) Bert Trautmann, OBE	goalkeeper	player	1949–1964
2005	(England) Colin Bell, MBE	attacking midfielder	player	1966–1979
2007	(Wales) Billy Meredith	right winger	player	1894–1906; 1921–1924
2007	(England) Peter Beardsley	midfielder	player	1998
2007	(Wales) Mark Hughes	forward	manager	2008–2009
2009	(England) Frank Swift	goalkeeper	player	1933–1949
2010	(England) Francis Lee, CBE	forward	player	1967–1974
2013	(England) Mike Summerbee	forward	player	1965–1975
2014	(England) Trevor Francis	centre forward	player	1981–1982
2014	(France) Patrick Vieira	holding midfielder	player EDS manager	2010–2011; 2011–2015
2015	(England) Stuart Pearce, MBE	left back	player coach manager	2001–2002; 2002–2005; 2005–2007
2015	(China) Sun Jihai	defender	player	2002–2008
2016	(England) David Seaman MBE	goalkeeper	player	2003–2004
2017	(England) Frank Lampard OBE	attacking midfielder	player	2014–2015
2020	(England) Justin Fashanu	centre forward	player	1989
2023	(Belgium) Vincent Kompany	centre half	player	2008–2019
	Managers with Manchester City backgrounds inducted to date			
2002	(Scotland) Sir Matt Busby, CBE, KCSG	inside right & right half	player	1928–1936
2004	(England) Don Revie, OBE	centre forward	player	1951–1956
2005	(England) Howard Kendall	attacking midfielder	manager	1989–1990
2009	(England) Joe Mercer, OBE	left half	manager	1965–1971
2009	(England) Malcolm Allison	centre half	assistant mgr. manager	1965–1971; 1971–1973; 1979–1980
	Manchester City "Football Foundation Community Champions" inducted to date			
2007	(Republic of Ireland) Niall Quinn, (Honorary) MBE	forward	player	1990–1996
	Manchester City teams inducted to date			
2009	(England) Manchester City 1967–70	not applicable		

Last updated: 5 May 2023.
Source: list of NFM Hall of Fame inductees

=== Premier League Hall of Fame ===
The following players have been inducted into the Premier League Hall of Fame, which is the hall of fame for association football players that have played in the Premier League. Inaugurated in 2020 but delayed a year due to the COVID-19 pandemic, the Hall of Fame is intended to recognise and honour players that have achieved great success and made a significant contribution to the league since its founding in 1992.

Inductees in Premier League Hall of Fame
Year of induction	Player	Position	Role at MCFC	Years in role at MCFC
Year of induction	Players with Manchester City backgrounds inducted to date			
2021	(England) Frank Lampard, OBE	attacking midfielder	player	2014–2015
2022	(Argentina) Sergio Agüero	centre forward	player	2011–2021
2022	(Belgium) Vincent Kompany	centre half	player	2008–2019
2022	(Denmark) Peter Schmeichel, MBE	goalkeeper	player	2002–2003
2022	(France) Patrick Vieira	holding midfielder	player EDS manager	2010–2011; 2011–2015
2024	(England) Andrew Cole	centre forward	player	2005–2006

Last updated: 22 April 2024.
Source: list of PL Hall of Fame inductees

=== Scottish Football Museum Hall of Fame ===
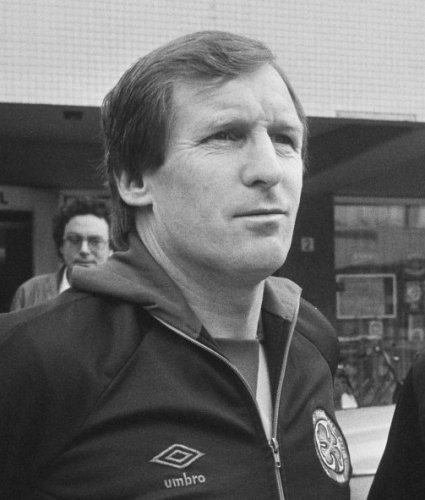
Iconic Celtic defender Billy McNeill managed the club between 1983 and 1986, securing promotion back to the top flight in his second season in charge.

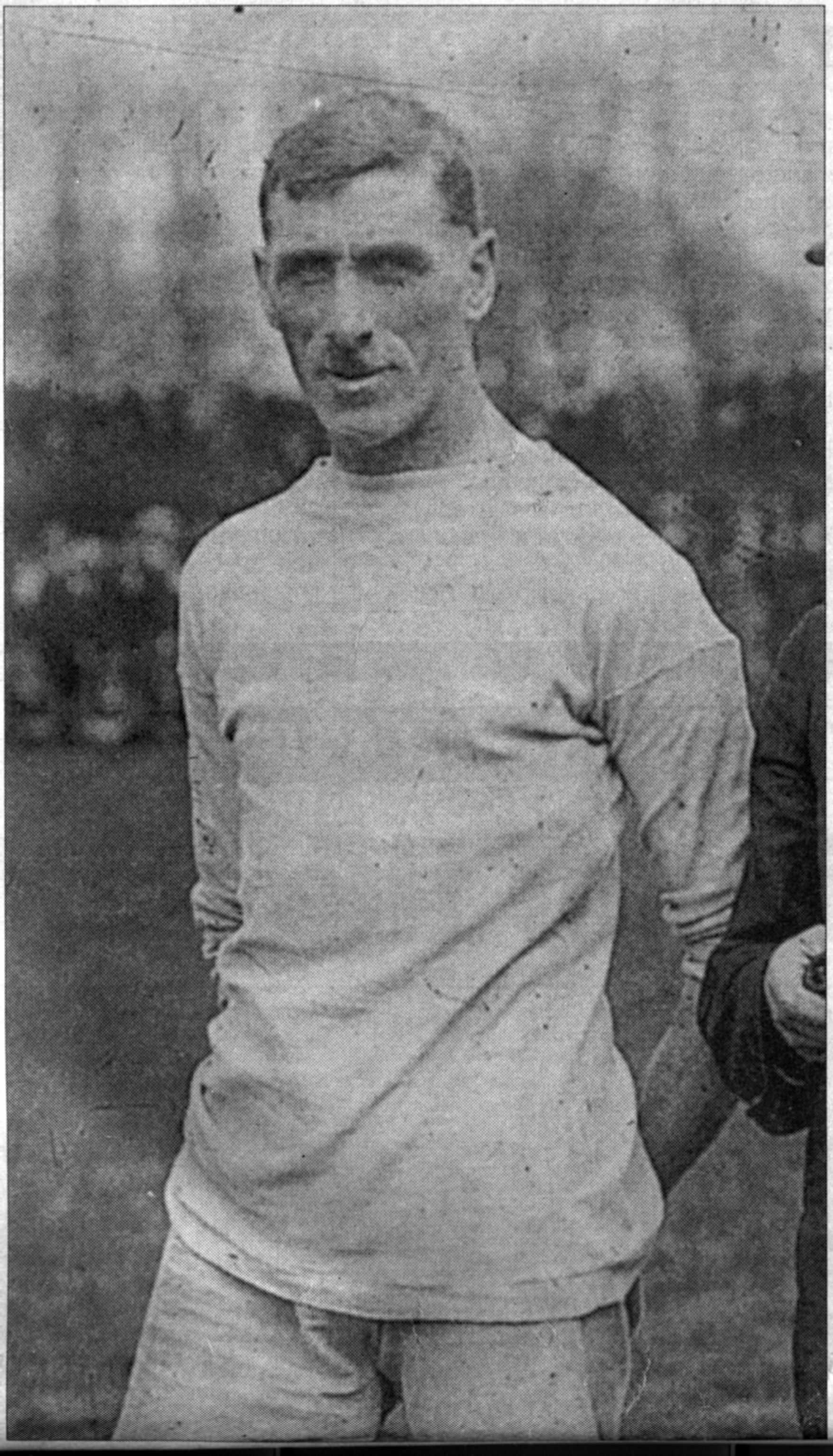
Dubbed the "Welsh Wizard" by his admirers, Billy Meredith made 394 appearances for the club in two separate spells with the Blues between 1894–1906 and 1921–1924, scoring a total of 151 goals.

The following former Manchester City players and managers are inductees in the Scottish Football Hall of Fame (a.k.a. the Scottish Football Museum Hall of Fame) and are listed according to the year of their induction within the appropriate category:

Inductees in SFM Hall of Fame
Year of induction	Player	Position	Role at MCFC	Years in role at MCFC
Year of induction	Players with Manchester City backgrounds inducted to date			
2004	(Scotland) Denis Law, CBE	forward	player	1960–1961; 1973–1974
2004	(Scotland) Billy McNeill, MBE	defender	manager	1983–1986
2011	(Scotland) Bobby Johnstone	inside right	player	1955–1959
	Managers with Manchester City backgrounds inducted to date			
2004	(Scotland) Sir Matt Busby, CBE, KCSG	inside right & right half	player	1928–1936

Last updated: 1 January 2016.
Source: list of SFM Hall of Fame inductees

=== Welsh Sports Hall of Fame ===
The following former Manchester City players and managers are inductees in the Welsh Sports Hall of Fame and are listed according to the year of their induction:

Inductees in WS Hall of Fame
Year of induction	Player	Position	Role at MCFC	Years in role at MCFC
Year of induction	Players with Manchester City backgrounds inducted to date			
1990	(Wales) Billy Meredith	right winger	player	1894–1906; 1921–1924
1999	(Wales) Horace Blew	full back	player	1906
2003	(Wales) Mark Hughes	forward	manager	2008–2009

Last updated: 18 July 2015.
Source: list of WS Hall of Fame inductees

== See also ==
- List of Manchester City F.C. players with between 25 and 99 appearances
- List of Manchester City F.C. players with fewer than 25 appearances

== List of players statistics references ==
=== Historic players table ===
==== Primary table reference ====
- James, Gary (2006). Manchester City – The Complete Record. Derby: Breedon. ISBN 1-85983-512-0.
