= 1907–08 Manchester City F.C. season =

English football club season

Manchester City F.C.
1907–08 season
- Manager: Harry Newbould
- Football League First Division: 3rd
- FA Cup: Third round
- Top goalscorer: League: Thornley (14 goals); All: Thornley (14 goals)
- Highest home attendance: 40,000 vs Manchester United (18 April 1908)
- Lowest home attendance: 2,500 vs Bristol City (21 April 1908)

The 1907–1908 season was Manchester City F.C.'s seventeenth season of league football and fifth consecutive season in the top flight of English football. It was their second season following a financial scandal at the club that had led to the suspension of many players in 1906. After their poor performance during the previous season, City managed to finish third in the Football League First Division.

== Football League First Division ==
Pos	Team	Pld	W	D	L	GF	GA	GAv	Pts
1	Manchester United (C)	38	23	6	9	81	48	1.688	52
2	Aston Villa	38	17	9	12	77	59	1.305	43
3	Manchester City	38	16	11	11	62	54	1.148	43
4	Newcastle United	38	15	12	11	65	54	1.204	42
5	The Wednesday	38	19	4	15	73	64	1.141	42

Source: World Football
Rules for classification: 1) Points; 2) Goal average; 3) Goals scored
(C) Champions

=== Results summary ===
Overall								Home						Away					
Pld	W	D	L	GF	GA	GAv	Pts	W	D	L	GF	GA	Pts	W	D	L	GF	GA	Pts
38	16	11	11	62	54	1.148	43	12	5	2	36	19	29	4	6	9	26	35	14

Source: rsssf.com

=== Reports ===
Date	Opponents	H / A	Venue	Result F – A	Scorers	Attendance
2 September 1907	Sunderland	A	Roker Park	5 – 2	Grieve (3), Stewart, Conlin	20,000
7 September 1907	Everton	A	Goodison Park	3 – 3	Thornley (3)	30,000
14 September 1907	Sunderland	H	Hyde Road	0 – 0		30,000
21 September 1907	Woolwich Arsenal	A	Manor Ground	1 – 2	Thornley	12,000
28 September 1907	The Wednesday	H	Hyde Road	3 – 2	Ross (2), Thornley	30,000
5 October 1907	Bristol City	A	Ashton Gate	1 – 2	Thornley	12,000
12 October 1907	Notts County	H	Hyde Road	2 – 1	Grieve (2)	10,000
19 October 1907	Newcastle United	H	Hyde Road	1 – 0	Thornley	28,000
26 October 1907	Preston North End	A	Deepdale	4 – 2	Dorsett, Grieve, Thornley, Conlin	14,000
2 November 1907	Bury	H	Hyde Road	2 – 2	Jones, Wood	30,000
9 November 1907	Aston Villa	A	Villa Park	2 – 2	Thornley (2)	20,000
16 November 1907	Liverpool	H	Hyde Road	1 – 1	Dorsett	25,000
23 November 1907	Middlesbrough	A	Ayresome Park	0 – 2		10,000
7 December 1907	Chelsea	A	Stamford Bridge	2 – 2	Buchan, Jones	40,000
14 December 1907	Nottingham Forest	H	Hyde Road	4 – 2	Wood (2), Eadie, Thornley	18,000
21 December 1907	Manchester United	A	Bank Street	1 – 3	Eadie	35,000
25 December 1907	Birmingham	A	St Andrew's	1 – 2	Dorsett	20,000
26 December 1907	Bolton Wanderers	H	Hyde Road	1 – 0	Grieve	35,000
28 December 1907	Blackburn Rovers	H	Hyde Road	2 – 0	Dorsett, Thornley	22,000
1 January 1908	Bolton Wanderers	A	Burnden Park	0 – 2		26,000
4 January 1908	Everton	H	Hyde Road	4 – 2	Grieve (2), Ross, Conlin	9,000
18 January 1908	Woolwich Arsenal	H	Hyde Road	4 – 0	Eadie, Wood, Grieve, Jones	25,000
25 January 1908	The Wednesday	A	Owlerton	1 – 5	Dorsett	11,000
8 February 1908	Notts County	A	Trent Bridge	0 – 1		8,000
15 February 1908	Newcastle United	A	St James' Park	1 – 1	Conlin	25,000
29 February 1908	Bury	A	Gigg Lane	0 – 0		10,000
7 March 1908	Aston Villa	H	Hyde Road	3 – 2	Dorsett (3)	25,000
11 March 1908	Sheffield United	H	Hyde Road	0 – 2		18,000
14 March 1908	Liverpool	A	Anfield	1 – 0	Dorsett	18,000
21 March 1908	Middlesbrough	H	Hyde Road	2 – 1	Webb, Thornley	35,000
28 March 1908	Sheffield United	A	Bramall Lane	2 – 1	Thornley, Conlin	12,000
4 April 1908	Chelsea	H	Hyde Road	0 – 3		25,000
6 April 1908	Preston North End	H	Hyde Road	5 – 0	Buchan (2), Webb (2), Wilkinson	10,000
11 April 1908	Nottingham Forest	A	City Ground	1 – 3	Dorsett	10,000
17 April 1908	Birmingham	H	Hyde Road	2 – 1	Jones, Conlin	27,000
18 April 1908	Manchester United	H	Hyde Road	0 – 0		40,000
21 April 1908	Bristol City	H	Hyde Road	0 – 0		2,500
25 April 1908	Blackburn Rovers	A	Ewood Park	0 – 0		10,000

== FA Cup ==
Date	Round	Opponents	H / A	Venue	Result F – A	Scorers	Attendance
11 January 1908	First round	Glossop	A	North Road	0 – 0		6,500
15 January 1908	First round replay	Glossop	H	Hyde Road	6 – 0	Buchan, Wood, Dorsett, Grieve, Jones, Conlin	20,000
1 February 1908	Second round	New Brompton	H	Hyde Road	1 – 1	Jones	7,000
5 February 1908	Second round replay	New Brompton	A	Priestfield Road	2 – 1	Buchan, Wood	12,000
22 February 1908	Third round	Fulham	H	Hyde Road	1 – 1	Blair	25,000
26 February 1908	Third round replay	Fulham	A	Craven Cottage	1 – 3	Wood	37,000

== Squad statistics ==
=== Squad ===
Appearances for competitive matches only

Pos.	Name	League		FA Cup		Total	
Pos.	Name	Apps	Goals	Apps	Goals	Apps	Goals
GK	(England) Walter Smith	38	0	6	0	44	0
DF	(Scotland) James Buchan	27	3	6	2	33	5
DF	(England) Frank Buckley	7	0	0	0	7	0
MF	(England) George Dorsett	34	10	6	1	40	11
MF	(England) Tom Holford	2	0	0	0	2	0
FW	(Wales) Lot Jones	24	4	5	2	29	6
FW	(England) Davie Ross	10	3	1	0	11	3
FW	(Scotland) George Stewart	10	1	0	0	10	1
FW	(England) Irvine Thornley	31	14	6	0	37	14
FW	(England) Charles Webb	11	3	0	0	11	3
FW	(England) John Wood	22	4	5	3	27	7
--	William Baldwin	1	0	0	0	1	0
--	Ernest Bannister	1	0	0	0	1	0
--	Jimmy Blair	34	0	5	1	39	1
--	Tommy Callaghan	2	0	0	0	2	0
--	Jimmy Conlin	37	6	6	1	43	7
--	(Scotland) Bill Eadie	29	3	6	0	35	3
--	Bob Grieve	17	10	2	1	19	11
--	Percy Hill	17	0	0	0	17	0
--	Bertram Jackson	21	0	6	0	27	0
--	Tommy Kelso	25	0	6	0	31	0
--	Frank Norgrove	14	0	0	0	14	0
--	Alex Steele	3	0	0	0	3	0
--	Jimmy Wilkinson	1	1	0	0	1	1

=== Scorers ===
==== All ====
Scorer	Goals
(England) Irvine Thornley	14
(England) George Dorsett	11
Bob Grieve	11
Jimmy Conlin	7
(England) John Wood	7
(Wales) Lot Jones	6
(Scotland) James Buchan	5
(Scotland) Bill Eadie	3
(England) Davie Ross	3
(England) Charles Webb	3
Jimmy Blair	1
(Scotland) George Stewart	1
Jimmy Wilkinson	1

==== League ====
Scorer	Goals
(England) Irvine Thornley	14
(England) George Dorsett	10
Bob Grieve	10
Jimmy Conlin	6
(Wales) Lot Jones	4
(England) John Wood	4
(Scotland) James Buchan	3
(Scotland) Bill Eadie	3
(England) Davie Ross	3
(England) Charles Webb	3
(Scotland) George Stewart	1
Jimmy Wilkinson	1

==== FA Cup ====
Scorer	Goals
(England) John Wood	3
(Scotland) James Buchan	2
(Wales) Lot Jones	2
Jimmy Blair	1
Jimmy Conlin	1
(England) George Dorsett	1
Bob Grieve	1

== See also ==
- Manchester City F.C. seasons
