= 1906–07 Manchester City F.C. season =

English football club season

Manchester City F.C.
1906–07 season
- Manager: Harry Newbould
- Football League First Division: 17th
- FA Cup: First round
- Top goalscorer: League: Thornley (13 goals); All: Thornley (14 goals)
- Highest home attendance: 40,000 vs Manchester United (1 December 1906)
- Lowest home attendance: 8,000 vs Middlesbrough (8 January 1907)

The 1906–07 season was Manchester City F.C.'s sixteenth season of league football and fourth consecutive season in the top flight of English football.

Following City's punishment for the awarding of players bonuses, then a misdemeanour in the FA regulations, the club was forced to start half from scratch for the 06–07 season, and in the first four games alone ten players made their club debut, with another six players donning the shirt for the first time over the course of the season. Consequently, the club's previously strong league form suffered a huge hit and the club struggled to a 17th-place finish, a full 12 places lower than their previous finish and five points off relegation.

Of note was that the first game of this season is believed to have been played under the highest temperature recorded in English football - 90 degrees Fahrenheit (32.2 °C). By the end of the game, City had only six players left on the pitch - five others had had to leave the field of play suffering from heat exhaustion.

== Football League First Division ==
Pos	Team	Pld	W	D	L	GF	GA	GAv	Pts	Relegation
15	Liverpool	38	13	7	18	64	65	0.985	33	
16	Bury	38	13	6	19	58	68	0.853	32	
17	Manchester City	38	10	12	16	53	77	0.688	32	
18	Notts County	38	8	15	15	46	50	0.920	31	
19	Derby County (R)	38	9	9	20	41	59	0.695	27	Relegation to the Second Division

Source: World Football
Rules for classification: 1) Points; 2) Goal average; 3) Goals scored
(R) Relegated

=== Results summary ===
Overall								Home						Away					
Pld	W	D	L	GF	GA	GAv	Pts	W	D	L	GF	GA	Pts	W	D	L	GF	GA	Pts
38	10	12	16	53	77	0.688	32	7	7	5	29	25	21	3	5	11	24	52	11

Source: rsssf.com

=== Reports ===
Date	Opponents	H / A	Venue	Result F – A	Scorers	Attendance
1 September 1906	Woolwich Arsenal	H	Hyde Road	1 – 4	Dorsett	18,000
3 September 1906	Everton	A	Goodison Park	1 – 9	Fisher	16,000
8 September 1906	The Wednesday	A	Owlerton	1 – 3	Conlin	12,000
15 September 1906	Bury	H	Hyde Road	2 – 2	Jones, Thornley	20,000
22 September 1906	Derby County	A	Baseball Ground	2 – 2	Dorsett (2)	8,000
29 September 1906	Middlesbrough	A	Ayresome Park	3 – 2	Stewart, Thornley, Fisher	22,000
6 October 1906	Preston North End	H	Hyde Road	1 – 1	Thornley	25,000
13 October 1906	Newcastle United	A	St James' Park	0 – 2		22,000
20 October 1906	Aston Villa	H	Hyde Road	4 – 2	Thornley (2), Stewart, Conlin	30,000
27 October 1906	Liverpool	A	Anfield	4 – 5	Thornley (2), Stewart, Jones	20,000
3 November 1906	Bristol City	H	Hyde Road	0 – 1		20,000
10 November 1906	Notts County	A	Trent Bridge	0 – 0		10,000
17 November 1906	Sheffield United	H	Hyde Road	0 – 2		20,000
24 November 1906	Bolton Wanderers	A	Burnden Park	1 – 1	Thornley	30,000
1 December 1906	Manchester United	H	Hyde Road	3 – 0	Stewart (2), Jones	40,000
8 December 1906	Stoke	A	Victoria Ground	0 – 3		5,000
15 December 1906	Blackburn Rovers	H	Hyde Road	0 – 0		12,000
22 December 1906	Sunderland	A	Roker Park	1 – 1	Thornley	12,000
25 December 1906	Birmingham	H	Hyde Road	1 – 0	Dorsett	24,000
26 December 1906	Everton	H	Hyde Road	3 – 1	Steele, Thornley, Jones	25,000
29 December 1906	Woolwich Arsenal	A	Manor Ground	1 – 4	Thornley	15,000
2 January 1907	Middlesbrough	H	Hyde Road	3 – 1	Jones (2), Thornley	8,000
5 January 1907	The Wednesday	H	Hyde Road	0 – 1		25,000
19 January 1907	Bury	A	Gigg Lane	1 – 3	Grieve	16,000
26 January 1907	Derby County	H	Hyde Road	2 – 2	Thornley, Jones	20,000
9 February 1907	Preston North End	A	Deepdale	3 – 1	Dorsett, Grieve, Jones	10,000
16 February 1907	Newcastle United	H	Hyde Road	1 – 1	Jones	35,000
23 February 1907	Aston Villa	A	Villa Park	1 – 4	Stewart	15,000
2 March 1907	Liverpool	H	Hyde Road	1 – 0	Grieve	20,000
9 March 1907	Bristol City	A	Ashton Gate	0 – 2		12,000
16 March 1907	Notts County	H	Hyde Road	2 – 1	Grieve, Ross	18,000
23 March 1907	Sheffield United	A	Bramall Lane	4 – 1	Grieve (2), Dorsett (2)	15,000
29 March 1907	Birmingham	A	St Andrew's	0 – 4		10,000
30 March 1907	Bolton Wanderers	H	Hyde Road	1 – 1	Jones	30,000
6 April 1907	Manchester United	A	Bank Street	1 – 1	Dorsett	35,000
13 April 1907	Stoke	H	Hyde Road	2 – 2	Stewart, Jones	12,000
20 April 1907	Blackburn Rovers	A	Ewood Park	0 – 4		5,000
27 April 1907	Sunderland	H	Hyde Road	2 – 3	Stewart, Ayres	15,000

== FA Cup ==
Date	Round	Opponents	H / A	Venue	Result F – A	Scorers	Attendance
12 January 1907	First round	Blackburn Rovers	A	Ewood Park	2 – 2	Dorsett, Thornley	20,000
16 January 1907	First round replay	Blackburn Rovers	H	Hyde Road	0 – 1		30,000

== Squad statistics ==
=== Squad ===
Appearances for competitive matches only

Pos.	Name	League		FA Cup		Total	
Pos.	Name	Apps	Goals	Apps	Goals	Apps	Goals
GK	Frank Davies	5	0	0	0	5	0
GK	William Hall	11	0	0	0	11	0
GK	(England) Walter Smith	22	0	2	0	24	0
DF	(Wales) Horace Blew	1	0	0	0	1	0
DF	(Scotland) James Buchan	28	0	2	0	30	0
MF	(England) George Dorsett	32	8	2	1	34	9
FW	(Wales) Lot Jones	27	11	2	0	29	11
FW	(England) Davie Ross	6	1	0	0	6	1
FW	(Scotland) George Stewart	36	8	2	0	38	8
FW	(England) Albert Fisher	5	2	0	0	5	2
FW	(England) Irvine Thornley	29	13	2	1	31	14
--	William Baldwin	1	0	0	0	1	0
--	Willie Banks	4	0	0	0	4	0
--	Jimmy Blair	9	0	0	0	9	0
--	John Christie	4	0	0	0	4	0
--	Jimmy Conlin	35	2	2	0	37	2
--	(Scotland) Bill Eadie	32	0	2	0	34	0
--	S. Eyres	1	0	0	0	1	0
--	Tommy Farrell	3	0	0	0	3	0
--	Bob Grieve	18	6	0	0	18	6
--	George Hamblett	1	0	0	0	1	0
--	Percy Hill	21	0	2	0	23	0
--	Tommy Kelso	23	0	0	0	23	0
--	(Scotland) Willie McOustra	9	0	0	0	9	0
--	Frank Norgrove	27	0	2	0	29	0
--	Bruce Rankin	2	0	0	0	2	0
--	Alex Steele	23	1	2	0	25	1
--	Jimmy Wilkinson	2	0	0	0	2	0

=== Scorers ===
==== All ====
Scorer	Goals
(England) Irvine Thornley	14
(Wales) Lot Jones	11
(England) George Dorsett	9
(Scotland) George Stewart	8
Bob Grieve	6
Jimmy Conlin	2
(England) Albert Fisher	2
S. Eyres	1
(England) Davie Ross	1
Alex Steele	1

==== League ====
Scorer	Goals
(England) Irvine Thornley	13
(Wales) Lot Jones	11
(England) George Dorsett	8
(Scotland) George Stewart	8
Bob Grieve	6
Jimmy Conlin	2
(England) Albert Fisher	2
S. Eyres	1
(England) Davie Ross	1
Alex Steele	1

==== FA Cup ====
Scorer	Goals
(England) George Dorsett	1
(England) Irvine Thornley	1

== See also ==
- Manchester City F.C. seasons
