= 1910–11 Manchester City F.C. season =

English football club season

Manchester City F.C.
1910–11 season
- Manager: Harry Newbould
- Football League First Division: 17th place
- FA Cup: Second round
- Top goalscorer: League: Wynn (9 goals); All: Wynn (9 goals)
- Highest home attendance: 40,000 vs Liverpool (24 September 1910); 40,000 vs Manchester United (21 January 1911)
- Lowest home attendance: 12,000 vs Bradford City (5 November 1910)

The 1910–11 season was Manchester City F.C.'s 20th season of league football and 1st season back in the First Division of English football following their promotion at the first attempt in the previous season.

Letter

== Football League First Division ==
Pos	Team	Pld	W	D	L	GF	GA	GAv	Pts	Relegation
15	Tottenham Hotspur	38	13	6	19	52	63	0.825	32	
16	Middlesbrough	38	11	10	17	49	63	0.778	32	
17	Manchester City	38	9	13	16	43	58	0.741	31	
18	Bury	38	9	11	18	43	71	0.606	29	
19	Bristol City (R)	38	11	5	22	43	66	0.652	27	Relegation to the Second Division

Source: World Football
Rules for classification: 1) Points; 2) Goal average; 3) Goals scored
(R) Relegated

=== Results summary ===
Overall								Home						Away					
Pld	W	D	L	GF	GA	GAv	Pts	W	D	L	GF	GA	Pts	W	D	L	GF	GA	Pts
38	9	13	16	43	58	0.741	31	7	5	7	26	26	19	2	8	9	17	32	12

Source: rsssf.com

=== Reports ===
Date	Opponents	H / A	Venue	Result F – A	Scorers	Attendance
1 September 1910	Bury	H	Hyde Road	5–1	Wynn (3), Holford, Conlin	18,000
3 September 1910	Preston North End	A	Deepdale	1–1	Holford	10,000
10 September 1910	Notts County	H	Hyde Road	0–1		30,000
17 September 1910	Manchester United	A	Old Trafford	1–2	Jones	60,000
24 September 1910	Liverpool	H	Hyde Road	1–2	J. Dorsett	40,000
1 October 1910	Bury	A	Gigg Lane	2–5	G. Dorsett, Wynn	15,000
8 October 1910	Sheffield United	H	Hyde Road	0–4		20,000
15 October 1910	Aston Villa	A	Villa Park	1–2	Wall	20,000
22 October 1910	Sunderland	H	Hyde Road	3–3	Norgrove, G. Dorsett, Thornley	25,000
29 October 1910	Woolwich Arsenal	A	Manor Ground	1–0	J. Dorsett	10,000
5 November 1910	Bradford City	H	Hyde Road	1–3	J. Dorsett	12,000
12 November 1910	Blackburn Rovers	A	Ewood Park	0–2		10,000
19 November 1910	Nottingham Forest	H	Hyde Road	1–0	Conlin	20,000
26 November 1910	Oldham Athletic	H	Hyde Road	2–0	Thornley, Conlin	25,000
3 December 1910	Everton	A	Goodison Park	0–1		8,000
10 December 1910	The Wednesday	H	Hyde Road	1–2	Thornley	20,000
17 December 1910	Bristol City	A	Ashton Gate	1–2	J. Smith	6,000
24 December 1910	Newcastle United	H	Hyde Road	2–0	Wynn, Conlin	25,000
26 December 1910	Middlesbrough	A	Ayresome Park	0–0		30,000
27 December 1910	Tottenham Hotspur	A	White Hart Lane	1–1	J. Smith	25,000
31 December 1910	Preston North End	H	Hyde Road	0–2		30,000
3 January 1911	Tottenham Hotspur	H	Hyde Road	2–1	Ross, Jones	20,000
7 January 1911	Notts County	A	Meadow Lane	1–0	Ross	10,000
21 January 1911	Manchester United	H	Hyde Road	1–1	Jones	40,000
28 January 1911	Liverpool	A	Anfield	1–1	J. Smith	16,000
11 February 1911	Sheffield United	A	Bramall Lane	2–2	J. Smith, Ross	12,000
18 February 1911	Aston Villa	H	Hyde Road	1–1	Jones	25,000
25 February 1911	Sunderland	A	Roker Park	0–4		10,000
4 March 1911	Woolwich Arsenal	H	Hyde Road	1–1	Thornley	20,000
14 March 1911	Bradford City	A	Valley Parade	0–1		7,000
18 March 1911	Blackburn Rovers	H	Hyde Road	0–0		35,000
25 March 1911	Nottingham Forest	A	City Ground	0–0		7,000
1 April 1911	Oldham Athletic	A	Boundary Park	1–1	J. Smith	25,000
8 April 1911	Everton	H	Hyde Road	2–1	Wynn, Thornley	25,000
14 April 1911	Middlesbrough	H	Hyde Road	2–1	Thornley, Jones	35,000
15 April 1911	The Wednesday	A	Owlerton	1–4	Jones	9,000
22 April 1911	Bristol City	H	Hyde Road	1–2	Wynn	30,000
29 April 1911	Newcastle United	A	St James' Park	3–3	Wynn (2), Ross	11,000

== FA Cup ==
Date	Round	Opponents	H / A	Venue	Result F – A	Scorers	Attendance
10 January 1911	First round	Stoke	A	Victoria Ground	2–1	J. Smith, Jones	29,000
4 February 1911	Second round	Wolverhampton Wanderers	A	Molineux	0–1		25,000

== Squad statistics ==
=== Squad ===
Appearances for competitive matches only

Pos.	Name	League		FA Cup		Total	
Pos.	Name	Apps	Goals	Apps	Goals	Apps	Goals
GK	Jack Lyall	7	0	0	0	7	0
GK	(England) Walter Smith	31	0	2	0	33	0
DF	(Scotland) James Buchan	6	0	0	0	6	0
DF	(England) Charlie Burgess	2	0	0	0	2	0
MF	(England) George Dorsett	23	2	2	0	25	2
MF	(England) Joe Dorsett	26	3	1	0	27	3
MF	(England) Tom Holford	29	2	2	0	31	2
FW	(England) John Brown	2	0	0	0	2	0
FW	(Wales) Lot Jones	34	6	2	1	36	7
FW	(England) Davie Ross	10	4	2	0	12	4
FW	(Scotland) George Stewart	17	0	2	0	19	0
FW	(England) Irvine Thornley	18	6	0	0	18	6
FW	(Wales) George Wynn	20	9	0	0	20	9
--	Bill Bottomley	19	0	0	0	19	0
--	George Brooks	1	0	0	0	1	0
--	John Chaplin	15	0	2	0	17	0
--	Rowland Codling	5	0	0	0	5	0
--	Jimmy Conlin	27	4	1	0	28	4
DF	(Scotland) Bill Eadie	29	0	2	0	31	0
--	Willie Gould	2	0	0	0	2	0
DF	(England) Reg Humphreys	3	0	0	0	3	0
--	Bertram Jackson	13	0	0	0	13	0
--	Tommy Kelso	31	0	2	0	33	0
--	John Nelson	8	0	0	0	8	0
--	Frank Norgrove	13	1	0	0	13	1
--	George Salt	1	0	0	0	1	0
--	Jonathon Smith	14	5	2	1	16	6
--	Len Wall	10	1	0	0	10	1
--	Jimmy Wilkinson	2	0	0	0	2	0

=== Scorers ===
==== All ====
Scorer	Goals
(Wales) George Wynn	9
(Wales) Lot Jones	7
Jonathon Smith	6
(England) Irvine Thornley	6
Jimmy Conlin	4
(England) Davie Ross	4
(England) Joe Dorsett	3
(England) George Dorsett	2
(England) Tom Holford	2
Frank Norgrove	1
Len Wall	1

==== League ====
Scorer	Goals
(Wales) George Wynn	9
(Wales) Lot Jones	6
(England) Irvine Thornley	6
Jonathon Smith	5
Jimmy Conlin	4
(England) Davie Ross	4
(England) Joe Dorsett	3
(England) George Dorsett	2
(England) Tom Holford	2
Frank Norgrove	1
Len Wall	1

==== FA Cup ====
Scorer	Goals
(Wales) Lot Jones	1
Jonathon Smith	1

== See also ==
- Manchester City F.C. seasons
