= 1911–12 Manchester City F.C. season =

English football club season

Manchester City F.C.
1911–12 season
- Manager: Harry Newbould
- Football League First Division: 15th place
- FA Cup: Second round
- Top goalscorer: League: Wynn (17 goals); All: Wynn (18 goals)
- Highest home attendance: 45,000 vs Oldham Athletic (3 February 1912)
- Lowest home attendance: 10,000 vs Liverpool (6 January 1912); 10,000 vs Bradford City (28 March 1912); 10,000 vs Tottenham Hotspur (5 April 1912)

The 1911–12 season was Manchester City F.C.'s 21st season of league football and 2nd consecutive season in the First Division of English football.

== Football League First Division ==
Pos	Team	Pld	W	D	L	GF	GA	GAv	Pts
13	Manchester United	38	13	11	14	45	60	0.750	37
14	Sheffield United	38	13	10	15	63	56	1.125	36
15	Manchester City	38	13	9	16	56	58	0.966	35
16	Notts County	38	14	7	17	46	63	0.730	35
17	Liverpool	38	12	10	16	49	55	0.891	34

Source: World Football
Rules for classification: 1) Points; 2) Goal average; 3) Goals scored

=== Results summary ===
Overall								Home						Away					
Pld	W	D	L	GF	GA	GAv	Pts	W	D	L	GF	GA	Pts	W	D	L	GF	GA	Pts
38	13	9	16	56	58	0.966	35	10	5	4	39	20	25	3	4	12	17	38	10

Source: rsssf.com

=== Reports ===
Date	Opponents	H / A	Venue	Result F – A	Scorers	Attendance
2 September 1911	Manchester United	H	Hyde Road	0 – 0		?,000
9 September 1911	Liverpool	A	Anfield	2 – 2	Kelso (2)	15,000
16 September 1911	Aston Villa	H	Hyde Road	2 – 6	Holford, Jones	30,000
23 September 1911	Newcastle United	A	St James' Park	0 – 1		10,000
30 September 1911	Sheffield United	H	Hyde Road	0 – 0		25,000
7 October 1911	Oldham Athletic	A	Boundary Park	1 – 4	Thornley	15,000
14 October 1911	Bolton Wanderers	H	Hyde Road	3 – 1	Wall, Wynn, Keary	25,000
21 October 1911	Bradford City	A	Valley Parade	1 – 4	Thornley	12,000
28 October 1911	Woolwich Arsenal	H	Hyde Road	3 – 3	Wynn (2), Thornley	25,000
4 November 1911	Preston North End	A	Deepdale	1 – 2	Kelso	10,000
11 November 1911	Everton	A	Goodison Park	0 – 1		15,000
18 November 1911	West Bromwich Albion	H	Hyde Road	0 – 2		12,000
25 November 1911	Sunderland	A	Roker Park	1 – 1	J. Dorsett	4,000
2 December 1911	Blackburn Rovers	H	Hyde Road	3 – 0	Wynn (2), J. Dorsett	40,000
9 December 1911	The Wednesday	A	Owlerton	0 – 3		12,000
16 December 1911	Bury	H	Hyde Road	2 – 0	Wynn, Thornley	14,000
23 December 1911	Middlesbrough	A	Ayresome Park	1 – 3	J. Dorsett	10,000
25 December 1911	Notts County	A	Meadow Lane	1 – 0	Young	15,000
26 December 1911	Notts County	H	Hyde Road	4 – 0	Fletcher, Wynn, Young, Jones	35,000
30 December 1911	Manchester United	A	Old Trafford	0 – 0		41,743
6 January 1912	Liverpool	H	Hyde Road	2 – 3	Wynn (2)	10,000
20 January 1912	Aston Villa	A	Villa Park	1 – 3	J. Dorsett	10,000
27 January 1912	Newcastle United	H	Hyde Road	1 – 1	Wynn	30,000
10 February 1912	Oldham Athletic	H	Hyde Road	1 – 3	J. Smith	25,000
17 February 1912	Bolton Wanderers	A	Burnden Park	1 – 2	Brooks	20,000
26 February 1912	Sheffield United	A	Bramall Lane	2 – 6	Thornley (2)	5,000
2 March 1912	Woolwich Arsenal	A	Manor Ground	0 – 2		12,000
9 March 1912	Preston North End	H	Hyde Road	0 – 0		13,000
16 March 1912	Everton	H	Hyde Road	4 – 0	Holford (4)	25,000
23 March 1912	West Bromwich Albion	A	The Hawthorns	1 – 1	Bottomley	8,000
28 March 1912	Bradford City	H	Hyde Road	4 – 0	Holford (2), Wynn, Jones	10,000
30 March 1912	Sunderland	H	Hyde Road	2 – 0	Wynn, Holford	20,000
5 April 1912	Tottenham Hotspur	H	Hyde Road	2 – 1	Jones, J. Dorsett	10,000
6 April 1912	Blackburn Rovers	A	Ewood Park	0 – 2		14,000
8 April 1912	Tottenham Hotspur	A	White Hart Lane	2 – 0	Jones, J. Dorsett	15,000
13 April 1912	The Wednesday	H	Hyde Road	4 – 0	Wynn (3), Jones	30,000
20 April 1912	Bury	A	Gigg Lane	2 – 1	Wynn (2)	18,000
27 April 1912	Middlesbrough	H	Hyde Road	2 – 0	Jones, J. Dorsett	20,000

== FA Cup ==
Date	Round	Opponents	H / A	Venue	Result F – A	Scorers	Attendance
13 January 1912	First round	Preston North End	A	Deepdale	1 – 0	Wynn	15,000
3 February 1912	Second round	Oldham Athletic	H	Hyde Road	0 – 1		45,000

== Squad statistics ==
=== Squad ===
Appearances for competitive matches only

Pos.	Name	League		FA Cup		Total	
Pos.	Name	Apps	Goals	Apps	Goals	Apps	Goals
GK	Augustus Beeby	11	0	0	0	11	0
GK	(England) Jim Goodchild	15	0	2	0	17	0
GK	(England) Walter Smith	12	0	0	0	12	0
DF	(England) Eli Fletcher	35	1	2	0	37	1
MF	(England) George Dorsett	1	0	0	0	1	0
MF	(England) Joe Dorsett	33	7	2	0	35	7
MF	(England) Sid Hoad	37	0	2	0	39	0
MF	(England) Tom Holford	32	4	2	0	34	4
FW	(England) Frank Booth	4	0	0	0	4	0
FW	(Wales) Lot Jones	24	7	2	0	26	7
FW	(England) Davie Ross	2	0	0	0	2	0
FW	(England) Irvine Thornley	18	10	0	0	18	10
FW	(Wales) George Wynn	31	17	2	1	33	18
FW	(Scotland) Alex Young	13	2	2	0	15	2
--	Joe Bentley	1	0	0	0	1	0
--	Bill Bottomley	19	1	0	0	19	1
--	George Brooks	2	1	0	0	2	1
--	Robert Davies	6	0	0	0	6	0
--	(Scotland) Bill Eadie	26	0	2	0	28	0
--	J. Eden	1	0	0	0	1	0
--	Billy Henry	25	0	2	0	27	0
--	Albert Keary	8	1	0	0	8	1
--	William Kelly	7	0	0	0	7	0
--	Tommy Kelso	9	3	0	0	9	3
--	Val Lawrence	19	0	2	0	21	0
--	Frank Norgrove	3	0	0	0	3	0
--	Jonathon Smith	4	1	0	0	4	1
--	Len Wall	20	1	0	0	20	1

=== Scorers ===
==== All ====
Scorer	Goals
(Wales) George Wynn	18
(England) Irvine Thornley	10
(England) Joe Dorsett	7
(Wales) Lot Jones	7
(England) Tom Holford	4
Tommy Kelso	3
(Scotland) Alex Young	2
Bill Bottomley	1
George Brooks	1
(England) Eli Fletcher	1
Keary	1
Jonathon Smith	1
Len Wall	1

==== League ====
Scorer	Goals
(Wales) George Wynn	17
(England) Irvine Thornley	10
(England) Joe Dorsett	7
(Wales) Lot Jones	7
(England) Tom Holford	4
Tommy Kelso	3
(Scotland) Alex Young	2
Bill Bottomley	1
George Brooks	1
(England) Eli Fletcher	1
Keary	1
Jonathon Smith	1
Len Wall	1

==== FA Cup ====
Scorer	Goals
(Wales) George Wynn	1

== See also ==
- Manchester City F.C. seasons
