= 1909–10 Manchester City F.C. season =

English football club season

Manchester City F.C.
1909–10 season
- Manager: Harry Newbould
- Football League Second Division: 1st (promoted, Champion)
- FA Cup: Fourth round
- Top goalscorer: League: Dorsett (13 goals); All: Dorsett (14 goals); Wynn (14 goals)
- Highest home attendance: 40,000 vs Oldham Athletic (26 March 1910)
- Lowest home attendance: 8,000 vs Lincoln City (11 September 1909); 8,000 vs Clapton Orient (13 April 1910)

The 1909–10 season was Manchester City F.C.'s nineteenth season of league football and first season back in the second rung of English football following their relegation the previous season. As in the 1902–03 season, City rebounded instantly with a promotion in their first year back in the Second Division.

During the season, Manchester City lost only 7 of its 38 league matches. The club scored a total of 81 goals, with six players reaching double digits.

Winning the division gave the club a third Second Division trophy win – something only Liverpool had achieved at this point. From 1910 to this day, no club has even for one season ever surpassed City's haul of second tier trophies, which currently stands at seven.

== Football League Second Division ==
Pos	Team	Pld	W	D	L	GF	GA	GAv	Pts	Promotion or relegation
1	Manchester City (C, P)	38	23	8	7	81	40	2.025	54	Promotion to the First Division
2	Oldham Athletic (P)	38	23	7	8	79	39	2.026	53	Promotion to the First Division
3	Hull City	38	23	7	8	80	46	1.739	53	
4	Derby County	38	22	9	7	72	47	1.532	53	
5	Leicester Fosse	38	20	4	14	79	58	1.362	44	

(C) Champions; (P) Promoted

=== Results summary ===
Overall								Home						Away					
Pld	W	D	L	GF	GA	GAv	Pts	W	D	L	GF	GA	Pts	W	D	L	GF	GA	Pts
38	23	8	7	81	40	2.025	54	15	2	2	51	17	32	8	6	5	30	23	22

Source: rsssf.com

=== Reports ===
Date	Opponents	H / A	Venue	Result F – A	Scorers	Attendance
2 September 1909	Blackpool	H	Hyde Road	1 – 2	Thornley	10,000
4 September 1909	Leicester Fosse	A	Filbert Street	3 – 1	Stewart, Ross, Conlin	9,000
11 September 1909	Lincoln City	H	Hyde Road	6 – 2	Jones (2), Thornley (2), Dorsett, Conlin	8,000
18 September 1909	Clapton Orient	A	Millfields Road	2 – 3	Dorsett, Ross	15,000
25 September 1909	Blackpool	A	Bloomfield Road	0 – 0		8,000
2 October 1909	Hull City	A	Anlaby Road	2 – 1	Jones, Dorsett	12,000
9 October 1909	Derby County	H	Hyde Road	2 – 1	Holford, Conlin	20,000
16 October 1909	Stockport County	A	Edgeley Park	2 – 1	Eadie, Conlin	12,000
23 October 1909	Glossop	H	Hyde Road	3 – 3	Ross (2), Holford	14,000
27 October 1909	Gainsborough Trinity	A	The Northolme	3 – 1	Jones (3)	6,000
30 October 1909	Birmingham	A	St Andrews	1 – 1	Thornley	18,000
6 November 1909	West Bromwich Albion	H	Hyde Road	3 – 2	Holford (2), Thornley	24,000
13 November 1909	Oldham Athletic	A	Boundary Park	0 – 1		22,000
27 November 1909	Fulham	A	Craven Cottage	1 – 1	Thornley	12,000
4 December 1909	Burnley	H	Hyde Road	4 – 0	Jones (2), Thornley, Dorsett	12,000
11 December 1909	Leeds City	A	Elland Road	3 – 1	Thornley (2), Ross	3,000
18 December 1909	Wolverhampton Wanderers	H	Hyde Road	6 – 0	Thornley (3), Dorsett (2), Ross	20,000
25 December 1909	Bradford Park Avenue	A	Park Avenue	0 – 2		18,000
27 December 1909	Grimsby Town	H	Hyde Road	2 – 0	Wynn, Holford	20,000
1 January 1910	Bradford Park Avenue	H	Hyde Road	3 – 1	Wynn, Dorsett (2)	25,000
8 January 1910	Leicester City	H	Hyde Road	2 – 0	Jones, Holford	25,000
22 January 1910	Lincoln City	A	Sincil Bank	2 – 0	Wynn, Conlin	9,000
12 February 1910	Hull City	H	Hyde Road	3 – 0	Conlin, Wynn, Holford	30,000
26 February 1910	Stockport County	H	Hyde Road	2 – 1	Wynn (2)	16,000
9 March 1910	Barnsley	H	Hyde Road	0 – 0		15,000
12 March 1910	Birmingham	H	Hyde Road	3 – 0	Eadie, Jones, Conlin	15,000
16 March 1910	Derby County	A	Baseball Ground	1 – 3	Dorsett	12,000
19 March 1910	West Bromwich Albion	A	The Hawthorns	0 – 0		10,000
25 March 1910	Grimsby Town	A	Blundell Park	1 – 0	Jones	8,000
26 March 1910	Oldham Athletic F.C.	H	Hyde Road	0 – 2		40,000
28 March 1910	Gainsborough Trinity	H	Hyde Road	3 – 1	Dorsett, Holford, Jones	15,000
2 April 1910	Barnsley	A	Oakwell	1 – 1	Dorsett	10,000
6 April 1910	Glossop	A	North Road	3 – 0	Conlin (2), Gould	5,000
9 April 1910	Fulham	H	Hyde Road	3 – 1	Holford (2), Wynn	16,000
13 April 1910	Clapton Orient	H	Hyde Road	2 – 1	Dorsett, Wynn	8,000
16 April 1910	Burnley	A	Turf Moor	3 – 3	Gould, Holford, Wynn	7,000
23 April 1910	Leeds City	H	Hyde Road	3 – 0	Dorsett, Wynn, Conlin	16,000
30 April 1910	Wolverhampton Wanderers	A	Molineux	2 – 3	Holford, Conlin	10,000

== FA Cup ==
Date	Round	Opponents	H / A	Venue	Result F – A	Scorers	Attendance
15 January 1910	First round	Workington Town	A	Borough Park	2 – 1	Wynn (2)	5,233
5 February 1910	Second round	Southampton	A	The Dell	5 – 0	Dorsett, Stewart, Jones, Conlin, Holford	15,965
19 February 1910	Third round	Aston Villa	A	Villa Park	2 – 1	Stewart, Jones	45,000
5 March 1910	Fourth round	Swindon Town	A	County Ground	0 – 2		14,429

== Squad statistics ==
=== Squad ===
Appearances for competitive matches only

Pos.	Name	League		FA Cup		Total	
Pos.	Name	Apps	Goals	Apps	Goals	Apps	Goals
GK	Frank Davies	1	0	0	0	1	0
GK	Jack Lyall	33	0	4	0	37	0
GK	(England) Walter Smith	3	0	0	0	3	0
GK	(England) John Swann	1	0	0	0	1	0
DF	(Scotland) James Buchan	20	0	0	0	20	0
DF	(England) Charlie Burgess	4	0	0	0	4	0
MF	(England) George Dorsett	38	13	4	1	42	14
MF	(England) Tom Holford	30	12	4	1	34	13
FW	(England) John Brown	2	0	0	0	2	0
FW	(Wales) Lot Jones	37	12	4	2	41	14
FW	(England) Davie Ross	11	6	0	0	11	6
FW	(Scotland) George Stewart	22	1	4	2	26	3
FW	(England) Irvine Thornley	23	12	0	0	23	12
FW	(Wales) George Wynn	20	10	4	2	24	12
--	Jimmy Blair	2	0	0	0	2	0
--	Bill Bottomley	14	0	4	0	18	0
FW	(England) Harry Chapelhow	7	0	0	0	7	0
--	Jimmy Conlin	35	11	4	1	39	12
DF	(England) Dan Coupe	1	0	0	0	1	0
--	(Scotland) Bill Eadie	23	2	4	0	27	2
--	George Furr	3	0	0	0	3	0
--	Willie Gould	6	2	0	0	6	2
--	Bertram Jackson	36	0	4	0	40	0
--	Francis James	2	0	0	0	2	0
--	Tommy Kelso	28	0	4	0	32	0
--	Frank Norgrove	8	0	0	0	8	0
--	Jimmy Wilkinson	9	0	0	0	9	0

=== Scorers ===
==== All ====
Scorer	Goals
(England) George Dorsett	14
(Wales) Lot Jones	14
(England) Tom Holford	13
Jimmy Conlin	12
(England) Irvine Thornley	12
(Wales) George Wynn	12
(England) Davie Ross	6
(Scotland) George Stewart	3
(Scotland) Bill Eadie	2
Willie Gould	2

==== League ====
Scorer	Goals
(England) George Dorsett	13
(England) Tom Holford	12
(Wales) Lot Jones	12
(England) Irvine Thornley	12
Jimmy Conlin	11
(Wales) George Wynn	10
(England) Davie Ross	6
(Scotland) Bill Eadie	2
Willie Gould	2
(Scotland) George Stewart	1

==== FA Cup ====
Scorer	Goals
(Wales) Lot Jones	2
(Scotland) George Stewart	2
(Wales) George Wynn	2
Jimmy Conlin	1
(England) George Dorsett	1
(England) Tom Holford	1

== See also ==
- Manchester City F.C. seasons
