= Bertram Jackson =

English footballer

Personal information
- Full name: Bertram Harold Jackson
- Date of birth: 1882
- Place of birth: Collyhurst, England
- Date of death: 1940 (aged 57–58)
- Position: Left back

Senior career*
Years	Team	Apps	(Gls)
1906–1907	Luton Town	14	(0)
1907–1911	Manchester City	91	(0)
- Stalybridge Celtic
- * Club domestic league appearances and goals

Bertram Harold Jackson (1882–1940) was an English professional footballer who played as a left back in the Football League for Manchester City between 1907 and 1911.

== Personal life ==
Jackson served as a private in the Prince of Wales' Own Civil Service Rifles during the First World War.

== Career statistics ==
Appearances and goals by club, season and competition
Club	Season	League			FA Cup		Total	
Club	Season	Division	Apps	Goals	Apps	Goals	Apps	Goals
Luton Town	1906–07	Southern League First Division	14	0	1	0	15	0
Manchester City	1907–08	First Division	21	0	6	0	27	0
Manchester City	1908–09	First Division	22	0	0	0	22	0
Manchester City	1909–10	Second Division	35	0	4	0	39	0
Manchester City	1910–11	First Division	13	0	0	0	13	0
Manchester City	Total		91	0	10	0	101	0
Career total			105	0	11	0	116	0

== Honours ==
Manchester City

- Football League Second Division: 1909–10
