= Dan Coupe =

English footballer (1885–1952)

Personal information
- Full name: Daniel Coupe
- Date of birth: 1885
- Place of birth: Worksop, England
- Date of death: 1954 (aged 68–69)
- Position: Right back

Senior career*
Years	Team	Apps	(Gls)
1906–1909	Worksop Town		
1909	Manchester City	1	(0)
- * Club domestic league appearances and goals

Daniel Coupe (1885–1952) was an English professional footballer who played in the Football League for Manchester City as a right back.

== Personal life ==
Coupe served as a private in the Leicestershire Regiment during the First World War. He was wounded by a mustard gas shell on 2 October 1917 and evacuated to several medical facilities before being transferred to 5th Northern General Hospital, Leicester, where he stayed for the next month. Eventually transported back to the frontline, Coupe suffered a gunshot wound to the left arm on 22 March 1918. After the war, Coupe was discharged in January 1919.

== Career statistics ==
Appearances and goals by club, season and competition
Club	Season	League			FA Cup		Total	
Club	Season	Division	Apps	Goals	Apps	Goals	Apps	Goals
Manchester City	1909–10	Second Division	1	0	0	0	1	0
Career Total			1	0	0	0	1	0
