= Reg Humphreys =

English footballer

Personal information
- Full name: Reginald Harry Humphreys
- Date of birth: 20 May 1888
- Place of birth: Whittington, England
- Date of death: 1967 (aged 78–79)
- Position: Right back

Senior career*
Years	Team	Apps	(Gls)
1909–1910	Wrexham		
1910	Oswestry Town		
1910–1911	Manchester City	3	(0)
- * Club domestic league appearances and goals

Reginald Harry Humphreys (20 May 1888 – 1967) was an English footballer who played in Football League for Manchester City as a right back.

== Personal life ==
Humpheys was born on 20 May 1888 in Whittington, Shropshire. He was married with two children, and worked as a joiner. He served as an Air Mechanic 1st Class in the Royal Air Force during the First World War. He died in 1967.

== Career statistics ==
Appearances and goals by club, season and competition
Club	Season	League			FA Cup		Total	
Club	Season	Division	Apps	Goals	Apps	Goals	Apps	Goals
Manchester City	1910–11	First Division	3	0	0	0	3	0
Career total			3	0	0	0	3	0
