= John Thornley (footballer, born 1885) =

English footballer

Personal information
- Full name: John William Thornley
- Date of birth: 19 September 1885
- Place of birth: Hayfield, England
- Date of death: 31 March 1918 (aged 32)
- Place of death: Pas-de-Calais, France
- Position: Forward

Senior career*
Years	Team	Apps	(Gls)
1902–1906	Glossop	5	(0)
1905	Manchester United	0	(0)
- * Club domestic league appearances and goals

John William Thornley (19 September 1885 – 31 March 1918) was an English amateur footballer who played in the Football League for Glossop as a forward.

== Personal life ==
Thornley was born in September 1885 in Hayfield, Derbyshire to Thomas and Henrietta Thornley and was baptised the following March in Whitfield, Derbyshire. His elder brother Irvine was also a footballer. In 1915, during the second year of the First World War, Thornley enlisted as a private in the Cheshire Regiment. He was wounded at the Battle of St Quentin and died of his wounds on 31 March 1918. Thornley was buried in Wimereux Communal Cemetery.
