= James Buchan (footballer) =

Scottish footballer

Personal information
- Full name: James Buchan
- Date of birth: 19 April 1881
- Place of birth: Perth, Scotland
- Date of death: 1950 (aged 68–69)
- Place of death: Glasgow, Scotland
- Position: Wing half

Senior career*
Years	Team	Apps	(Gls)
–1902	St Johnstone		
1902–1904	Hibernian	43	(4)
1904	Woolwich Arsenal	8	(0)
1904–1911	Manchester City	155	(8)
1911–1912	Motherwell	14	(1)
1912–1913	Kilmarnock	20	(0)
1913–	Forfar Athletic		
–1915	St Johnstone		

Managerial career
- 1920–1922: St Johnstone
- * Club domestic league appearances and goals

James Buchan (19 April 1881 – 1950) was a Scottish professional footballer who played as a wing half. He played for Manchester City, Woolwich Arsenal, St Johnstone, Hibernian, Motherwell, Kilmarnock and Forfar Athletic. After his retirement from football, Buchan managed St Johnstone.

== Career ==
A wing half, Buchan began his career at hometown junior league club St Johnstone and moved to Scottish League First Division club Hibernian in 1902. In his first season at Easter Road he was a part of the team which won the 1902–03 First Division title. Buchan remained with the club until April 1904, when he moved to newly promoted English First Division club Woolwich Arsenal. He made just eight appearances during the early months of the 1904–05 season, before falling out of favour and moving north to join divisional rivals Manchester City in March 1905. Buchan remained at Hyde Road for the following seven years and after the heartbreak of relegation to the Second Division at the end of the 1908–09 season, he helped the club to an immediate return to the top-flight at the end of 1909–10. Buchan dropped out of favour during the 1910–11 season and returned to Scotland to finish his career with Motherwell, Kilmarnock, Forfar Athletic and a second spell with St Johnstone, whom he later managed between 1920 and 1922.

== Personal life ==
On 8 December 1915, during the second year of the First World War, Buchan attested as a reserve private in the Highland Light Infantry. He was mobilised on 28 August 1916 and transferred to the Army Pay Corps a matter of days later. Buchan was transferred to the Ayrshire (Earl of Carrick's Own) Yeomanry on 29 September 1917, with whom he served until being transferred to the army reserve in March 1919.

== Career statistics ==
Appearances and goals by club, season and competition
Club	Season	League			National Cup		Total	
Club	Season	Division	Apps	Goals	Apps	Goals	Apps	Goals
Hibernian	1902–03	Scottish First Division	21	2	5	2	26	4
Hibernian	1903–04	Scottish First Division	22	2	2	0	24	2
Hibernian	Total		43	4	7	2	50	6
Woolwich Arsenal	1904–05	First Division	8	0	0	0	8	0
Manchester City	1904–05	First Division	7	0	—		7	0
Manchester City	1905–06	First Division	29	1	0	0	29	1
Manchester City	1906–07	First Division	28	0	2	0	30	0
Manchester City	1907–08	First Division	27	3	6	2	33	5
Manchester City	1908–09	First Division	38	4	1	0	39	4
Manchester City	1909–10	Second Division	20	0	0	0	20	0
Manchester City	1910–11	First Division	6	0	0	0	6	0
Manchester City	Total		155	8	9	2	164	10
Motherwell	1911–12	Scottish First Division	14	1	6	1	20	2
Kilmarnock	1911–12	Scottish First Division	5	0	—		5	0
Kilmarnock	1912–13	Scottish First Division	15	0	0	0	15	0
Kilmarnock	Total		20	0	0	0	20	0
Career total			240	13	22	5	262	18

== Honours ==
Hibernian

- Scottish League First Division: 1902–03

Manchester City

- Football League Second Division: 1909–10
