= Albert Fisher (footballer) =

English footballer (1881–1937)

Personal information
- Full name: Albert William Fisher
- Date of birth: February 1881
- Place of birth: Birmingham, England
- Date of death: 4 December 1937 (aged 56)
- Place of death: Nottingham, England
- Height: 5 ft 8 in (1.73 m)
- Position: Inside forward

Senior career*
Years	Team	Apps	(Gls)
–	Ashbury Richmond		
–	Soho Caledonians		
1902–1903	Aston Villa	1	(0)
1903–1905	Bristol City	50	(21)
1905–1906	Brighton & Hove Albion	20	(8)
1906–1907	Manchester City	5	(2)
–	Bradford Park Avenue		
–	Coventry City		
–	Merthyr Town		

Managerial career
- –: Merthyr Town (player-manager)
- 1913–1927: Notts County
- * Club domestic league appearances and goals

Albert William Fisher (February 1881 – 4 December 1937) was an English professional footballer who scored 23 goals from 56 appearances in the Football League playing as an inside forward for Aston Villa, Bristol City and Manchester City. He also played for Southern League clubs Brighton & Hove Albion, Bradford Park Avenue, Queens Park Rangers, Coventry City and Merthyr Town. As player-manager, he led Merthyr Town to the Southern League Second Division title in 1911–12, and went on to manage Notts County.

Fisher was born in Birmingham, and died in Nottingham at the age of 56.
