= Frank Norgrove =

English footballer

Personal information
- Full name: Frank Norgrove
- Date of birth: 17 July 1879
- Place of birth: Hyde, Greater Manchester, England
- Date of death: 1948 (aged 69–70)
- Position: Defender

Senior career*
Years	Team	Apps	(Gls)
1901–1904	Glossop	79	(0)
1904–1912	Manchester City	94	(1)
Total		173	(1)
- * Club domestic league appearances and goals

Frank Norgrove (17 July 1878–1948) was an English footballer who played in the Football League for Glossop and Manchester City.
