= Irvine Thornley =

English footballer (1883–1955)

Personal information
- Full name: Irvine Thornley
- Date of birth: 11 October 1883
- Place of birth: Whitfield, England
- Date of death: 24 April 1955 (aged 71)
- Place of death: South Shields, England
- Height: 5 ft 9 in (1.75 m)
- Position: Forward

Senior career*
| Years | Team | Apps | (Gls) |
- Glossop Villa
- Glossop St James
| 1901–1904 | Glossop | 79 | (42) |
| 1904–1912 | Manchester City | 195 | (92) |
| 1912–1915 | South Shields Adelaide | | |
| 1917–1918 | Clydebank | 3 | (1) |
| 1919–1920 | Hamilton Academical | 27 | (16) |
- Houghton

International career
| 1907 | England | 1 | (0) |
| | Football League XI | 2 | |
- * Club domestic league appearances and goals

Irvine Thornley (11 October 1883 – 24 April 1955) was an English professional footballer who played as a centre-forward. After playing for local amateur clubs, he made his professional debut for Glossop in 1901. He moved to Manchester City in 1904, becoming a prolific goalscorer for the club and winning a single cap for England in 1907.

== Early life ==
Thornley was born in Whitfield, Derbyshire, the second of four children to Thomas Thornley and Henrietta Thornley (née Cooper). His father worked as a butcher and his mother was a cotton weaver. His brother John would also become a footballer. As a teenager, he worked as a tripe dresser.

== Career ==
Thornley began his football career playing for local amateur clubs Glossop Villa and Glossop St. James before joining Glossop in 1901. In April 1904, he joined First Division side Manchester City along with Frank Norgrove. Soon after the Football Association carried out an investigation into the transfer practices of the club and manager Tom Maley regarding making additional payments to players to avoid the maximum wage at the time.

The investigation led to Maley receiving a life ban from the game and seventeen players were either fined or suspended. With a new squad hastily assembled, City met Arsenal soon after in a match played during a heatwave. With temperatures soaring, Thornley collapsed thirty minutes into the match and was described as "prostrate and very ill". City went on to lose four other players during the match due to the extreme heat, finishing the match with only six players.

In his second season at the club, he scored 21 league goals in the First Division to finish as the club's top goalscorer, a feat which he achieved in three consecutive seasons afterwards. He received his first call-up for the England team in 1907, being named as a reserve player for a match against Ireland on 16 February 1907 before making his debut against Wales the following month.

He also made two appearances for the Football League representative side. City were relegated in 1909 but won promotion from the Second Division at the first attempt by finishing the 1909–10 season as champions.

In 1912, he was awarded a benefit match by the club that raised £1,036, a record at the time for a player benefit match, before joining South Shields. He spent three seasons with South Shields playing in the North Eastern League, scoring 154 goals in 130 matches for the club including 70 in one season.

Following the outbreak of World War I, Thornley joined the Royal Field Artillery at the age of 32 and served as a gunner until he was transferred to the army reserve in April 1917. He was discharged from the army in December 1918.

His brother John, who played for Manchester United as an amateur, was killed during the war after succumbing to wounds he suffered during the Battle of St. Quentin during Operation Michael. When competitive football resumed after the war, Thornley played for Hamilton Academical and Houghton before retiring.

== Honours ==
Manchester City

- Football League Second Division: 1909–10

Hamilton Academical

- Lanarkshire Cup: 1919–20
