= Davie Ross =

English footballer

Davie Ross (8 January 1883 – 2 January 1947) was an English footballer and a member of the Norwich City Hall of Fame.

Ross made 71 appearances for Norwich as an inside-left between 1905 and 1907, scoring 49 times. (See List of Norwich City F.C. club records)

"There was outcry when City sold [their] star forward... to Manchester City in February 1907 for a Southern League record fee of £650, plus a guaranteed £250 from a friendly - a sign of things to come for a club who have so often sold their star goalscorers".
