= George Stewart (footballer, born 1883) =

Scottish footballer

Personal information
- Full name: George Lindsay Stewart
- Date of birth: 11 December 1882
- Place of birth: Wishaw, Scotland
- Date of death: 10 November 1962 (aged 79)
- Place of death: Davyhulme, England
- Position: Outside right

Senior career*
Years	Team	Apps	(Gls)
- Wishaw Thistle
- Strathclyde
1904–1906	Hibernian	48	(4)
1906–1911	Manchester City	102	(13)
1911–1913	Partick Thistle	15	(2)
1912–1913	→ Stalybridge Celtic (loan)		
1913–1915	Merthyr Town		

International career
1904–1906	Scottish League XI	2	(0)
1906–1907	Scotland	4	(0)
- * Club domestic league appearances and goals

George Lindsay Stewart (11 December 1882 – 10 November 1962) was a Scottish professional footballer, who played for Hibernian, Manchester City, Partick Thistle and the Scotland national team.

== Club career ==
An outside right, Stewart began his professional career with Hibernian in 1904, replacing John Stewart (no relation) who had been part of the squad that won the Scottish Football League in 1903.

After two good years in Leith, Stewart was transferred to Manchester City at the end of the 1905–06 season for £650, which was a substantial transfer fee (the record fee at the time, for the transfer of Alf Common, was £1000). He made over 100 league appearances for City, experiencing a relegation in 1909 followed by promotion as winners of the 1909–10 Football League Second Division, before ending his career with short spells at Partick Thistle, Stalybridge Celtic and Merthyr Town, settling in the Manchester area.

== International career ==
While playing for Hibs at club level Stewart made his Scotland debut in a 2–0 defeat by Wales at Tynecastle in the 1906 British Home Championship, and then also played in the 2–1 victory against England in the same tournament. He won two further international caps during his time with Manchester City.
