= Harry Newbould =

English football manager (1861–1928)

Henry J. Newbould (1861 – April 1928) was an English football player and manager who managed Derby County and Manchester City.

Newbould was born in Liverpool, Lancashire. Before becoming a manager, he combined a job at an iron foundry with playing football, playing as an outside right. Derby St. Luke and Sheffield Wednesday were among his clubs. He later trained as an accountant.

In 1900 he became the first person to hold the position of manager at Derby County, stepping up from his previous position as assistant secretary. Prior to his appointment, the Derby team was selected by committee. Newbould's Derby reached the FA Cup final in 1903, but lost 6–0 to Bury at Crystal Palace. In 1906, financial pressures led Derby's directors to sell England international Steve Bloomer to Middlesbrough. Newbould disagreed with the decision, and left the club at the end of the season to take up the managerial position at Manchester City.

Newbould joined Manchester City with the club in turmoil. A scandal concerning illegal payments to players had resulted in the suspension of seventeen players, leaving a squad of only eleven players. Newbould was tasked with both rebuilding the team and proving the club's accounts were being run in a lawful manner. Newbould's first match was an encounter with Woolwich Arsenal at Hyde Road. The makeshift side struggled on a hot day, losing three players to sunstroke by half-time. By the end of the match City were down to just six players, the final score was 4–1 to Arsenal. His second match saw an even heavier defeat, 9–1 to Everton, a scoreline which remains a club record defeat more than a century later. Over the course of the season Newbould's City gradually recovered, winning the first top-flight Manchester derby 3–0, but only finished two places above the relegation zone. The following season, he guided Manchester City to a third-place finish, but performances were inconsistent, and in the 1908–09 season the club were relegated. Newbould remained manager after relegation and led City to the Second Division championship at the first attempt. After two consecutive bottom half Division One finishes, Newbould left the club.

After leaving City he had a brief spell as a coach at Copenhagen's Akademisk Boldklub before becoming secretary of the Players' Union in 1913, a position he held until his death in 1928.
