= George Dorsett =

English footballer

George Dorsett (1881–1942) was an English footballer who played for West Bromwich Albion and Manchester City as a winger and wing-half. He was born at Brownhills, Staffordshire.
