= Bill Eadie (footballer) =

Scottish footballer (1881-1931)

Personal information
- Full name: William Phillips Eadie
- Date of birth: 1881
- Place of birth: Greenock, Scotland
- Date of death: 1931 (aged 49–50)
- Place of death: Angus, Scotland
- Position: Centre half

Senior career*
Years	Team	Apps	(Gls)
1901–1902	Greenock Overton		
1902–1906	Morton	72	(1)
1906–1914	Manchester City	184	(6)
1914–1915	Derby County		
- * Club domestic league appearances and goals

William Phillips Eadie (1881–1931) was a Scottish footballer who played for Greenock Overton, Morton, Manchester City and Derby County as a centre-half.

He played for Manchester City between 1906 and 1914, appearing more than 200 times in Football League and FA Cup matches. He later made 31 appearances for Derby County.
