= Lot Jones =

Welsh footballer

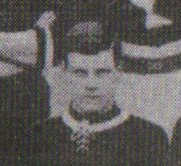

Personal information
- Full name: William Thomas Jones
- Date of birth: 28 June 1882 (baptism)
- Place of birth: Chirk, Wales
- Date of death: 13 July 1941 (aged 59)
- Place of death: Chirk, Wales
- Position: Inside forward

Senior career*
Years	Team	Apps	(Gls)
- Chirk
- Druids
1903–1919	Manchester City	281	(69)
- Southend United
1920–1922	Aberdare Athletic	18	(0)
1922	Wrexham	7	(2)
- Oswestry Town
- Chirk

International career
1905–1920	Wales	20	(6)

Managerial career
- 1920–1922: Aberdare Athletic (player-manager)
- * Club domestic league appearances and goals

William Thomas Jones (baptised 28 June 1882 – 13 July 1941), also known as William "Lot" Jones and Billy Lot Jones, was a Welsh footballer who played as a forward.

Jones was born in Chirk, Denbighshire and was the son of Elizabeth Jones (born 1864) and grandson of Lot Jones (born 1831), a coal miner and labourer. He was treated as a son of his grandfather, Lot. His biological uncle was the footballer, Di Jones. As a youth he worked as a pit miner and was one of several footballers to emerge from the area around the start of the 20th century, along with Billy Meredith and George Wynn. He signed for Manchester City in January 1903 from Rushton Druids, but did not establish himself immediately. He made only a single appearance in his first full season, scoring a goal in a 2–1 defeat to West Bromwich Albion in April 1904, and by the time he received his next opportunity he had been at the club for two years. From January 1905 until the end of the 1905–06 season Jones played in around half of his club's matches.

In the 1906 close season a financial scandal engulfed the club, resulting in the suspension of 17 senior players and several club officials, none of whom were permitted to play for the club once their suspensions ended. Jones was not implicated in the scandal, but with few experienced teammates remaining, his team plunged from title contenders to relegation candidates. The first match after the suspensions was particularly eventful. Manchester City fielded five debutants against Woolwich Arsenal, in a match played in stifling heat. The conditions caused several City men to collapse, and by half time only eight remained. Arsenal eased to a 4–1 win. By the final whistle, Jones was one of only six Manchester City players left. The following match was a club record 9–1 defeat at Everton, though over the course of the season, enough points were gained to secure First Division survival. By now, Jones was a first team regular. In 1906–07 he scored 11 goals in 27 league matches. Playing at inside-left, Jones formed a lasting left-sided partnership with Jimmy Conlin, backed up by Jimmy Blair at left-half.

During a successful 1907–08 season in which Manchester City equalled their previous best of third in the league, Jones was given a benefit match. Middlesbrough provided the opposition, and Jones received £835 after expenses. The following season, Manchester City was relegated to the Second Division, though with Jones as captain they made an immediate return, winning the Second Division championship in 1910. This made Jones the second City captain (after Billy Meredith) to win a trophy. He continued to play for Manchester City until competitive football ceased due to the First World War, at which point he volunteered for the 23rd (Service) Battalion, Royal Fusiliers, "Sportmen's Battalion" When League football resumed in 1919, Jones was transferred to Southend United.

In April 1920, Jones agreed to join Aberdare Athletic as a player-manager. He resigned from his position in February 1922, before joining Wrexham the following month.

In total, he played for Manchester City 301 times, and scored 76 goals between 1903 and 1914. He also won 20 caps and scored six goals for the Wales national football team.
