= 1918–19 Manchester City F.C. season =

English football club season

Manchester City F.C.
1918–19 season
- Manager: Ernest Mangnall
- War League Principal Tournament Lancashire Section: 5th
- Subsidiary Tournament Lancashire Section Group C: 1st
- Top goalscorer: League: Browell (14 goals); All: Barnes (20 goals)
- Highest home attendance: 35,000 vs Manchester United (18 April 1919)
- Lowest home attendance: 10,000 vs Stoke (14 September 1918); 10,000 vs Southport Vulcan (14 December 1918)

The 1918–19 season was Manchester City F.C.'s twenty-eighth season of league football.

Owing to World War I, once again Manchester City played non-competitive war league football. In the principal tournament they contested the Lancashire Section, while in the four-team subsidiary tournament they contested the Group C of the Lancashire Section.

== War Leagues ==
=== Principal Tournament ===
==== Lancashire Section ====
Pos	Team	Pld	W	D	L	GF	GA	GR	Pts
2	Liverpool	30	19	4	7	82	33	2.485	42
3	Bolton Wanderers	30	15	6	9	58	58	1.000	36
4	Manchester City	30	15	3	12	57	36	1.583	33
5	Southport Vulcan	30	15	3	12	49	53	0.925	33
6	Preston North End	30	12	6	12	41	51	0.804	30

Source: rsssf.com

===== Results summary =====
Overall								Home						Away					
Pld	W	D	L	GF	GA	GD	Pts	W	D	L	GF	GA	GD	W	D	L	GF	GA	GD
300	1500	3	12	57	36	+21	33	9	2	4	33	11	+22	6	1	8	24	25	–1

N.B. Points awarded for a win: 2

===== Reports =====
Date	Opponents	H / A	Venue	Result F – A	Scorers	Attendance
7 September 1918	Stoke	A	Victoria Ground	0 – 3		8,000
14 September 1918	Stoke	H	Hyde Road	0 – 2		10,000
21 September 1918	Bury	A	Gigg Lane	1 – 0	Moses	8,000
28 September 1918	Bury	H	Hyde Road	7 – 0	Browell (3), Brennan, P. Fairclough, Moses, Kenyon	12,000
5 October 1918	Manchester United	A	Old Trafford	2 – 0	Kenyon, Cartwright	10,000
12 October 1918	Manchester United	H	Hyde Road	0 – 0		15,000
19 October 1918	Blackpool	A	Bloomfield Road	3 – 0	Kenyon, Moses, Browell	9,000
26 October 1918	Blackpool	H	Hyde Road	4 – 0	Lievesley (2), Cartwright, Browell	15,000
2 November 1918	Stockport County	H	Hyde Road	1 – 0	Lievesley	12,000
9 November 1918	Stockport County	A	Edgeley Park	1 – 1	Browell	3,000
16 November 1918	Liverpool	H	Hyde Road	0 – 2		25,000
23 November 1918	Liverpool	A	Anfield	0 – 2		20,000
30 November 1918	Burnley	H	Hyde Road	2 – 1	Lievesley, Smith	12,000
7 December 1918	Burnley	A	Turf Moor	1 – 2	Lievesley	9,000
14 December 1918	Southport Vulcan	H	Hyde Road	0 – 1		10,000
21 December 1918	Southport Vulcan	A	Haig Avenue	0 – 2		6,000
28 December 1918	Preston North End	H	Hyde Road	2 – 0	Wynn, Browell	13,000
11 January 1919	Rochdale	H	Hyde Road	1 – 1	Lievesley	12,000
18 January 1919	Rochdale	A	Spotland	5 – 4	Barnes (2), Dorsett (2), Smith	5,000
25 January 1919	Everton	H	Hyde Road	1 – 0	Murphy	25,000
1 February 1919	Everton	A	Goodison Park	0 – 3		31,000
8 February 1919	Oldham Athletic	H	Hyde Road	3 – 0	Lievesley (2), Barnes	18,000
15 February 1919	Oldham Athletic	A	Boundary Park	3 – 0	Browell, Barnes, Murphy	10,000
22 February 1919	Blackburn Rovers	H	Hyde Road	5 – 1	Barnes (3), Johnson, Browell	22,000
1 March 1919	Blackburn Rovers	A	Ewood Park	1 – 2	Browell	8,000
8 March 1919	Port Vale	H	Hyde Road	6 – 1	Johnson (3), Browell (2), Barnes	14,000
15 March 1919	Port Vale	A	Recreation Ground	5 – 1	Barnes (3), Browell, A. Fairclough	8,000
22 March 1919	Bolton Wanderers	H	Hyde Road	1 – 2	Browell	20,000
29 March 1919	Bolton Wanderers	A	Burnden Park	1 – 3	Barnes	30,000
10 April 1919	Preston North End	A	Deepdale	1 – 2	Barnes	14,000

=== Subsidiary Tournament ===
==== Lancashire Section, Group C ====
Pos	Team	Pld	W	D	L	GF	GA	GR	Pts
1	Manchester City	6	5	1	0	14	4	3.500	11
2	Stoke	6	2	2	2	9	10	0.900	6
3	Manchester United	6	2	0	4	9	14	0.643	4
4	Port Vale	6	1	1	4	9	13	0.692	3

Source: rsssf.com

===== Results summary =====
Overall								Home						Away					
Pld	W	D	L	GF	GA	GD	Pts	W	D	L	GF	GA	GD	W	D	L	GF	GA	GD
6	5	1	0	14	4	+10	11	3	0	0	8	1	+7	2	1	0	6	3	+3

N.B. Points awarded for a win: 2

===== Reports =====
Date	Opponents	H / A	Venue	Result F – A	Scorers	Attendance
5 April 1919	Stoke	H	Hyde Road	1 – 0	A. Fairclough	25,000
12 April 1919	Stoke	A	Victoria Ground	1 – 1	Barnes	14,000
18 April 1919	Manchester United	H	Hyde Road	3 – 0	Barnes (2), Wynn	35,000
19 April 1919	Port Vale	A	Recreation Ground	1 – 0	Browell	8,000
21 April 1919	Manchester United	A	Old Trafford	4 – 2	Barness (2), Browell, Lomas	35,000
26 April 1919	Port Vale	H	Hyde Road	4 – 1	Browell (2), Barnes (2)	20,000

== Squad statistics ==
=== Squad ===
Appearances for competitive matches only

Pos.	Name	Principal		Subsidiary		Total	
Pos.	Name	Apps	Goals	Apps	Goals	Apps	Goals
GK	(England) Jim Goodchild	25	0	4	0	29	0
GK	Percy Kite	1	0	0	0	1	0
GK	(England) Walter Smith	4	0	2	0	6	0
DF	(England) Eli Fletcher	29	0	6	0	35	0
DF	(England) Fred Parker	16	0	2	0	18	0
MF	(England) Sid Hoad	3	1	3	0	0	1
FW	(England) Horace Barnes	18	16	0	0	18	16
FW	(England) Ted Hanney	1	0	0	0	1	0
FW	(England) Gordon Hoare	1	1	0	0	1	1
FW	(Wales) Lot Jones	8	0	1	0	9	0
FW	(England) Billy Lomas	0	0	5	0	5	0
FW	(Wales) Billy Meredith	27	2	6	0	33	2
FW	(England) Harry Taylor	1	0	0	0	1	0
FW	(England) Harold Walden	2	1	0	0	2	1
FW	(Wales) George Wynn	18	3	2	1	20	4
--	Armstrong	0	0	4	0	4	0
--	Bill Bottomley	23	0	1	0	24	0
--	Jack Brennan	12	2	1	0	13	2
--	T. Broad	2	0	0	0	2	0
--	Alf Capper	1	5	0	0	1	5
--	Joe Cartwright	23	2	4	0	27	2
--	J. Clegg	0	0	2	0	2	0
--	Cruse	1	0	0	0	1	0
--	Alfred Davies	18	1	0	0	18	1
--	Peter Fairclough	20	4	4	0	24	4
DF	(England) Peter Gartland	19	0	2	0	21	0
--	Robert Geddes	1	0	0	0	1	0
--	Goddard	3	3	0	0	3	3
--	R. Hargreaves	0	0	1	0	1	0
--	M. Lee	0	0	1	0	1	0
--	F. McIlvenney	0	0	2	1	2	1
--	Malone	0	0	1	0	1	0
--	Miller	4	0	0	0	4	0
--	Nelson	6	2	0	0	6	2
--	H. Newton	0	0	4	1	4	1
--	William Newton	5	1	2	0	7	1
--	Sid Scott	8	0	1	0	9	0
--	Skeldon	1	0	0	0	1	0
--	J.D. Tavo	2	1	0	0	2	1
--	Herbert Tyler	22	3	6	0	28	3
--	Woodhouse	0	0	1	0	1	0
--	Jimmy Wray	5	1	1	0	6	1

=== Scorers ===
==== All ====
Scorer	Goals
(England) Horace Barnes	20
(England) Tommy Browell	18
(England) Fred Lievesley	8
A. Johnson	4
Kenyon	3
Moses	3
Joe Cartwright	2
(England) Joe Dorsett	2
Albert Fairclough	2
(England) Spud Murphy	2
(England) Andy Smith	2
(Wales) George Wynn	2
Jack Brennan	1
Peter Fairclough	1
(England) Billy Lomas	1

==== Principal Tournament ====
Scorer	Goals
(England) Tommy Browell	14
(England) Horace Barnes	13
(England) Fred Lievesley	8
A. Johnson	4
Kenyon	3
Moses	3
Joe Cartwright	2
(England) Joe Dorsett	2
(England) Spud Murphy	2
(England) Andy Smith	2
Jack Brennan	1
Albert Fairclough	1
Peter Fairclough	1
(Wales) George Wynn	1

==== Subsidiary Tournament ====
Scorer	Goals
(England) Horace Barnes	7
(England) Tommy Browell	4
Albert Fairclough	1
(England) Billy Lomas	1
(Wales) George Wynn	1

== See also ==
- Manchester City F.C. seasons
