= 1915–16 Manchester City F.C. season =

English football club season

Manchester City F.C.
1915–16 season
- Manager: Ernest Mangnall
- War League Principal Tournament Lancashire Section: 1st
- Subsidiary Tournament Lancashire Section Southern Division: 1st
- Top goalscorer: League: Barnes (26 goals); All: Barnes (36 goals)
- Highest home attendance: 24,000 vs Everton (22 April 1916)
- Lowest home attendance: 3,000 vs Liverpool (11 December 1915)

The 1915–16 season was Manchester City F.C.s twenty-fifth season of league football.

With the start of the First World War, all Football League football was cancelled. In its place were formed War Leagues, based on geographical lines rather than based on previous league placement. Manchester City contested the Lancashire Section in the Principal Tournament, and the Southern Division of the Lancashire Section in the Subsidiary Tournament. However, none of these were considered to be competitive football, and thus their records are not recognised by the Football League.

== War Leagues ==
=== Principal Tournament ===
==== Lancashire Section ====
Pos	Team	Pld	W	D	L	GF	GA	GR	Pts
1	Manchester City	26	16	3	7	61	35	1.743	35
2	Burnley	26	14	5	7	71	43	1.651	33
3	Blackpool	26	14	3	9	54	41	1.317	31
4	Everton	25	15	0	10	59	42	1.405	30
5	Oldham Athletic	25	13	3	9	52	44	1.182	29

Source: rsssf.com

===== Results summary =====
Overall								Home						Away					
Pld	W	D	L	GF	GA	GD	Pts	W	D	L	GF	GA	GD	W	D	L	GF	GA	GD
26	16	3	7	61	35	+26	35	11	1	1	42	15	+27	5	2	6	19	20	–1

N.B. Points awarded for a win: 2

===== Reports =====
Date	Opponents	H / A	Venue	Result F – A	Scorers	Attendance
4 September 1915	Stockport County	H	Hyde Road	3 – 1	P. Fairclough, Wynn, Barnes	12,000
11 September 1915	Liverpool	A	Anfield	1 – 0	Cruse	15,000
18 September 1915	Bury	H	Hyde Road	5 – 4	Barnes (3), Cruse, Wynn	8,000
25 September 1915	Manchester United	A	Old Trafford	1 – 1	Barnes	20,000
2 October 1915	Blackpool	H	Hyde Road	3 – 0	Barnes (3)	5,000
9 October 1915	Southport Central	A	Haig Avenue	2 – 0	Barnes, Hughes	7,000
16 October 1915	Oldham Athletic	H	Hyde Road	2 – 2	A. Fairclough, Barnes	13,000
23 October 1915	Everton	A	Goodison Park	2 – 4	Barnes (2)	22,000
30 October 1915	Bolton Wanderers	H	Hyde Road	1 – 2	Barnes	5,000
6 November 1915	Rochdale	A	Spotland	2 – 0	Barnes (2)	1,000
13 November 1915	Stoke	A	Victoria Ground	0 – 1		7,000
20 November 1915	Burnley	H	Hyde Road	1 – 0	Hughes	15,000
27 November 1915	Preston North End	A	Deepdale	2 – 3	Howard, P. Fairclough	3,000
4 December 1915	Stockport County	A	Edgeley Park	1 – 1	Howard	10,000
11 December 1915	Liverpool	H	Hyde Road	2 – 1	Howard, Barnes	3,000
18 December 1915	Bury	A	Gigg Lane	3 – 0	Howard, Dorsett, ? (o.g.)	2,000
25 December 1915	Manchester United	H	Hyde Road	2 – 1	Taylor, Barnes	20,000
1 January 1916	Blackpool	A	Bloomfield Road	0 – 2		10,000
8 January 1916	Southport Central	H	Hyde Road	5 – 0	Taylor (3), Barnes (2)	12,000
15 January 1916	Oldham Athletic	A	Boundary Park	2 – 1	Taylor (2)	4,000
22 January 1916	Everton	H	Hyde Road	2 – 1	Taylor, Barnes	20,000
29 January 1916	Bolton Wanderers	A	Burnden Park	2 – 4	P. Fairclough, Barnes	15,000
5 February 1916	Rochdale	H	Hyde Road	4 – 1	P. Fairclough, Barnes (2), Cartwright	8,000
12 February 1916	Stoke	H	Hyde Road	4 – 2	P. Fairclough (2), Taylor, Barnes	10,000
19 February 1916	Burnley	A	Turf Moor	1 – 3	P. Fairclough	12,000
26 February 1916	Preston North End	H	Hyde Road	8 – 0	P. Fairclough (5), Barnes (2), Cartwright	6,000

=== Subsidiary Tournament ===
==== Lancashire Section, Southern Division ====
Pos	Team	Pld	W	D	L	GF	GA	GR	Pts
1	Manchester City	10	5	3	2	23	19	1.211	13
2	Everton	10	6	1	3	19	16	1.188	13
3	Liverpool	10	4	2	4	21	13	1.615	10
4	Oldham Athletic	10	4	2	4	17	21	0.810	10
5	Stockport County	10	4	1	5	19	18	1.056	9
6	Manchester United	10	2	1	7	12	24	0.500	5

Source: rsssf.com

===== Results summary =====
Overall								Home						Away					
Pld	W	D	L	GF	GA	GD	Pts	W	D	L	GF	GA	GD	W	D	L	GF	GA	GD
10	5	3	2	23	19	+4	13	3	2	0	15	12	+3	2	1	2	8	7	+1

N.B. Points awarded for a win: 2

===== Reports =====
Date	Opponents	H / A	Venue	Result F – A	Scorers	Attendance
4 March 1916	Stockport County	A	Edgeley Park	0 – 2		9,000
11 March 1916	Liverpool	H	Hyde Road	1 – 1	Barnes	10,000
18 March 1916	Everton	A	Goodison Park	1 – 1	Meredith	14,000
25 March 1916	Manchester United	A	Old Trafford	2 – 0	Taylor, Cartwright	15,000
1 April 1916	Oldham Athletic	H	Hyde Road	4 – 4	Barnes (3), Cartwright	8,000
8 April 1916	Stockport County	H	Hyde Road	3 – 2	Brennan, Jones, Barnes	10,000
15 April 1916	Liverpool	A	Anfield	2 – 0	Taylor, Barnes	10,000
21 April 1916	Oldham Athletic	A	Boundary Park	3 – 4	Taylor (2), Barnes	9,000
22 April 1916	Everton	H	Hyde Road	5 – 4	Barnes (2), Taylor, Jones, Meredith	24,000
29 April 1916	Manchester United	H	Hyde Road	2 – 1	Barnes, ? (o.g.)	18,000

== Squad statistics ==
=== Squad ===
Appearances for competitive matches only

Pos.	Name	Principal		Subsidiary		Total	
Pos.	Name	Apps	Goals	Apps	Goals	Apps	Goals
GK	(England) Jim Goodchild	25	0	9	0	34	0
GK	G. Howe	1	0	0	0	1	0
GK	(England) Walter Smith	0	0	1	0	1	0
DF	(England) Eli Fletcher	24	0	9	0	33	0
MF	(England) Joe Dorsett	6	1	0	0	6	1
FW	(England) Horace Barnes	24	26	10	10	34	36
FW	(England) Fred Howard	7	4	0	0	7	4
FW	(Wales) Lot Jones	6	0	7	2	13	2
FW	(Wales) Billy Meredith	0	0	5	2	5	2
FW	(England) Harry Taylor	22	8	8	5	30	13
FW	(Wales) George Wynn	4	2	1	0	5	2
--	Albert Allen	3	0	0	0	3	0
--	Bill Bottomley	6	0	0	0	6	0
--	Jack Brennan	26	0	10	1	36	1
--	Tommy Broad	26	0	5	0	31	0
--	Joe Cartwright	13	2	10	0	23	2
--	Corcoran	0	0	1	0	1	0
--	Cruse	3	2	0	0	3	2
--	Albert Fairclough	3	1	0	0	3	1
--	Peter Fairclough	13	12	3	0	16	12
DF	(England) Peter Gartland	2	0	7	0	9	0
--	(Scotland) Jock Henderson	23	0	10	0	33	0
--	Billy Henry	23	0	2	0	25	0
--	Edwin Hughes	25	2	10	0	35	2
--	F. Jones	0	0	1	0	1	0
--	T. Lewis	0	0	1	0	1	0
--	Tomlinson	1	0	0	0	1	0

=== Scorers ===
==== All ====
Scorer	Goals
(England) Horace Barnes	36
(England) Harry Taylor	13
Peter Fairclough	12
Joe Cartwright	4
(England) Fred Howard	4
Cruse	2
Edwin Hughes	2
(Wales) Lot Jones	2
(Wales) Billy Meredith	2
(Wales) George Wynn	2
Jack Brennan	1
(England) Joe Dorsett	1
Albert Fairclough	1

==== Principal Tournament ====
Scorer	Goals
(England) Horace Barnes	26
Peter Fairclough	12
(England) Harry Taylor	8
(England) Fred Howard	4
Joe Cartwright	2
Cruse	2
Edwin Hughes	2
(Wales) George Wynn	2
(England) Joe Dorsett	1
Albert Fairclough	1

==== Subsidiary Tournament ====
Scorer	Goals
(England) Horace Barnes	10
(England) Harry Taylor	5
Joe Cartwright	2
(Wales) Lot Jones	2
(Wales) Billy Meredith	2
Jack Brennan	1

== See also ==
- Manchester City F.C. seasons
