= 1916–17 Manchester City F.C. season =

English football club season

Manchester City F.C.
1916–17 season
- Manager: Ernest Mangnall
- War League Principal Tournament Lancashire Section: 4th
- Subsidiary Tournament Lancashire Section Group D: 4th
- Top goalscorer: League: Barnes (16 goals); All: Barnes (16 goals)
- Highest home attendance: 15,000 vs Manchester United (3 March 1917); 15,000 vs Manchester United (21 April 1917)
- Lowest home attendance: 3,000 vs Port Vale (31 March 1917)

The 1916–17 season was Manchester City F.C.'s twenty-sixth season of league football.

Owing to World War I, once again Manchester City played non-competitive war league football. In the principal tournament they contested the Lancashire Section, which was expanded to 16 teams to give a more complete 30-game season. In the subsidiary tournament they contested Group D of the Lancashire Section, with the groups reduced to four teams in size to complement the increased playing season of the Principal Tournament.

== War Leagues ==
=== Principal Tournament ===
==== Lancashire Section ====
Pos	Team	Pld	W	D	L	GF	GA	GR	Pts
2	Stockport County	30	18	7	5	61	31	1.968	43
3	Stoke	30	16	7	7	64	36	1.778	39
4	Manchester City	30	14	9	7	49	29	1.690	37
5	Everton	30	15	7	8	62	41	1.512	37
6	Burnley	30	15	4	11	73	56	1.304	34

Source: rsssf.com

===== Results summary =====
Overall								Home						Away					
Pld	W	D	L	GF	GA	GD	Pts	W	D	L	GF	GA	GD	W	D	L	GF	GA	GD
30	14	9	7	49	29	+20	37	11	3	1	35	10	+25	3	6	6	14	19	–5

N.B. Points awarded for a win: 2

===== Reports =====
Date	Opponents	H / A	Venue	Result F – A	Scorers	Attendance
2 September 1916	Stoke	A	Victoria Ground	0 – 1		6,000
9 September 1916	Southport Central	H	Hyde Road	0 – 0		8,000
16 September 1916	Blackburn Rovers	A	Ewood Park	1 – 2	P. Fairclough	3,000
23 September 1916	Blackpool	H	Hyde Road	4 – 0	Barnes (3), Brennan	10,000
30 September 1916	Everton	H	Hyde Road	4 – 1	Barnes (3), Hoare	14,000
7 October 1916	Rochdale	A	Spotland	2 – 2	Barnes, Brennan	1,000
14 October 1916	Bolton Wanderers	H	Hyde Road	1 – 0	P. Fairclough	8,000
21 October 1916	Port Vale	A	Recreation Ground	1 – 0	P. Fairclough	6,000
28 October 1916	Oldham Athletic	H	Hyde Road	2 – 1	Cartwright, Walden	9,000
4 November 1916	Preston North End	A	Deepdale	2 – 2	Wynn, Barnes	3,000
11 November 1916	Burnley	H	Hyde Road	2 – 1	Wray, Meredith	14,000
18 November 1916	Manchester United	A	Old Trafford	1 – 2	Hoad	10,000
25 November 1916	Liverpool	H	Hyde Road	1 – 1	Barnes	10,000
2 December 1916	Stockport County	A	Edgeley Park	0 – 0		6,000
9 December 1916	Bury	H	Hyde Road	1 – 1	Meredith	5,000
23 December 1916	Southport Central	A	Haig Avenue	0 – 0		1,000
25 December 1916	Stoke	H	Hyde Road	1 – 0	Wynn	12,000
30 December 1916	Blackburn Rovers	H	Hyde Road	8 – 0	Capper (5), Nelson (2), Davies	10,000
6 January 1917	Blackpool	A	Bloomfield Road	1 – 3	Cartwright	4,000
13 January 1917	Everton	A	Goodison Park	2 – 0	P. Fairclough, Barnes	8,000
20 January 1917	Rochdale	H	Hyde Road	2 – 1	Wynn, Barnes	7,000
27 January 1917	Bolton Wanderers	A	Burnden Park	2 – 2	Tavo, W. Newton	2,000
3 February 1917	Port Vale	H	Hyde Road	2 – 0	Barnes (2)	6,000
10 February 1917	Oldham Athletic	A	Boundary Park	1 – 2	Tyler	3,000
17 February 1917	Preston North End	H	Hyde Road	5 – 1	Tyler (2), Goddard (3)	7,000
24 February 1917	Burnley	A	Turf Moor	1 – 0	Barnes	4,000
3 March 1917	Manchester United	H	Hyde Road	1 – 0	Barnes	15,000
10 March 1917	Liverpool	A	Anfield	0 – 3		14,000
17 March 1917	Stockport County	H	Hyde Road	1 – 3	Barnes	14,000
24 March 1917	Bury	A	Gigg Lane	0 – 0		3,000

=== Subsidiary Tournament ===
==== Lancashire Section, Group D ====
Pos	Team	Pld	W	D	L	GF	GA	GR	Pts
1	Manchester United	6	4	0	2	15	9	1.667	8
2	Stoke	6	3	0	3	11	6	1.833	6
3	Port Vale	6	2	1	3	9	12	0.750	5
4	Manchester City	6	2	1	3	3	11	0.273	5

Source: rsssf.com

===== Results summary =====
Overall								Home						Away					
Pld	W	D	L	GF	GA	GD	Pts	W	D	L	GF	GA	GD	W	D	L	GF	GA	GD
6	2	1	3	3	11	–8	5	2	0	1	2	1	+1	0	1	2	1	10	–9

N.B. Points awarded for a win: 2

===== Reports =====
Date	Opponents	H / A	Venue	Result F – A	Scorers	Attendance
31 March 1917	Port Vale	H	Hyde Road	1 – 0	Wynn	3,000
6 April 1917	Stoke	H	Hyde Road	1 – 0	McIlvenney	12,000
7 April 1917	Manchester United	A	Old Trafford	1 – 5	H. Newton	15,000
9 April 1917	Stoke	A	Victoria Ground	0 – 5		8,000
14 April 1917	Port Vale	A	Recreation Ground	0 – 0		5,000
21 April 1917	Manchester United	H	Hyde Road	0 – 1		15,000

== Squad statistics ==
=== Squad ===
Appearances for competitive matches only

Pos.	Name	Principal		Subsidiary		Total	
Pos.	Name	Apps	Goals	Apps	Goals	Apps	Goals
GK	(England) Jim Goodchild	25	0	4	0	29	0
GK	Percy Kite	1	0	0	0	1	0
GK	(England) Walter Smith	4	0	2	0	6	0
DF	(England) Eli Fletcher	29	0	6	0	35	0
DF	(England) Fred Parker	16	0	2	0	18	0
MF	(England) Sid Hoad	3	1	3	0	0	1
FW	(England) Horace Barnes	18	16	0	0	18	16
FW	(England) Ted Hanney	1	0	0	0	1	0
FW	(England) Gordon Hoare	1	1	0	0	1	1
FW	(Wales) Lot Jones	8	0	1	0	9	0
FW	(England) Billy Lomas	0	0	5	0	5	0
FW	(Wales) Billy Meredith	27	2	6	0	33	2
FW	(England) Harry Taylor	1	0	0	0	1	0
FW	(England) Harold Walden	2	1	0	0	2	1
FW	(Wales) George Wynn	18	3	2	1	20	4
--	Armstrong	0	0	4	0	4	0
--	Bill Bottomley	23	0	1	0	24	0
--	Jack Brennan	12	2	1	0	13	2
--	T. Broad	2	0	0	0	2	0
--	Alf Capper	1	5	0	0	1	5
--	Joe Cartwright	23	2	4	0	27	2
--	J. Clegg	0	0	2	0	2	0
--	Cruse	1	0	0	0	1	0
--	Alfred Davies	18	1	0	0	18	1
--	Peter Fairclough	20	4	4	0	24	4
DF	(England) Peter Gartland	19	0	2	0	21	0
--	Robert Geddes	1	0	0	0	1	0
--	Goddard	3	3	0	0	3	3
--	R. Hargreaves	0	0	1	0	1	0
--	M. Lee	0	0	1	0	1	0
--	F. McIlvenney	0	0	2	1	2	1
--	Malone	0	0	1	0	1	0
--	Miller	4	0	0	0	4	0
--	Nelson	6	2	0	0	6	2
--	H. Newton	0	0	4	1	4	1
--	William Newton	5	1	2	0	7	1
--	Sid Scott	8	0	1	0	9	0
--	Skeldon	1	0	0	0	1	0
--	J.D. Tavo	2	1	0	0	2	1
--	Herbert Tyler	22	3	6	0	28	3
--	Woodhouse	0	0	1	0	1	0
--	Jimmy Wray	5	1	1	0	6	1

=== Scorers ===
==== All ====
Scorer	Goals
(England) Horace Barnes	16
(England) Alf Capper	5
Peter Fairclough	4
(Wales) George Wynn	4
Goddard	3
Herbert Tyler	3
Jack Brennan	2
Joe Cartwright	2
(Wales) Billy Meredith	2
Nelson	2
Alfred Davies	1
(England) Sid Hoad	1
(England) Gordon Hoare	1
F. McIlvenney	1
H. Newton	1
William Newton	1
J.D. Tavo	1
(England) Harold Walden	1
Jimmy Wray	1

==== Principal Tournament ====
Scorer	Goals
(England) Horace Barnes	16
(England) Alf Capper	5
Peter Fairclough	4
Goddard	3
Herbert Tyler	3
(Wales) George Wynn	3
Jack Brennan	2
Joe Cartwright	2
(Wales) Billy Meredith	2
Nelson	2
Alfred Davies	1
(England) Sid Hoad	1
(England) Gordon Hoare	1
William Newton	1
J.D. Tavo	1
(England) Harold Walden	1
Jimmy Wray	1

==== Subsidiary Tournament ====
Scorer	Goals
F. McIlvenney	1
H. Newton	1
(Wales) George Wynn	1

== See also ==
- Manchester City F.C. seasons
