= 1919–20 Manchester City F.C. season =

English football club season

Manchester City F.C.
1919–20 season
- Manager: Ernest Mangnall
- Football League First Division: 7th
- FA Cup: Second round
- Top goalscorer: League: Barnes (22 goals); Browell (22 goals); All: Barnes (23 goals)
- Highest home attendance: 35,000 vs Liverpool (27 March 1920)
- Lowest home attendance: 10,000 vs Bradford Park Avenue (13 March 1920)
Home colours

The 1919–20 season was Manchester City F.C.'s twenty-ninth season of league football, and first season back in the Football League and the FA Cup after the cancellation of competitive league football during World War I.

For this season, the Football League also made the decision to expand the size of their leagues to 22 teams apiece, giving Manchester City their first taste of a 42-match league season.

== Football League First Division ==
Pos	Team	Pld	W	D	L	GF	GA	GAv	Pts
5	Sunderland	42	22	4	16	72	59	1.220	48
6	Bolton Wanderers	42	19	9	14	72	65	1.108	47
7	Manchester City	42	18	9	15	71	62	1.145	45
8	Newcastle United	42	17	9	16	44	39	1.128	43
9	Aston Villa	42	18	6	18	75	73	1.027	42

Source: World Football
Rules for classification: 1) Points; 2) Goal average; 3) Goals scored

=== Results summary ===
Overall								Home						Away					
Pld	W	D	L	GF	GA	GAv	Pts	W	D	L	GF	GA	Pts	W	D	L	GF	GA	Pts
42	18	9	15	71	62	1.145	45	14	5	2	52	27	33	4	4	13	19	35	12

Source: rsssf.com

=== Reports ===
Date	Opponents	H / A	Venue	Result F – A	Scorers	Attendance
30 August 1919	Sheffield United	H	Hyde Road	3 – 3	Barnes (2), Browell	30,000
1 September 1919	Oldham Athletic	A	Boundary Park	3 – 1	Browell (2), Cartwright	3,000
6 September 1919	Sheffield United	A	Bramall Lane	1 – 3	Wynn	30,000
8 September 1919	Oldham Athletic	H	Hyde Road	3 – 1	Browell (2), Barnes	22,000
13 September 1919	Bolton Wanderers	H	Hyde Road	1 – 4	Crawshaw	20,000
20 September 1919	Bolton Wanderers	A	Burnden Park	2 – 6	Taylor, Browell	30,000
27 September 1919	Notts County	H	Hyde Road	4 – 1	Barnes (3), Taylor	20,000
4 October 1919	Notts County	A	Meadow Lane	1 – 4	Barnes	16,000
11 October 1919	Manchester United	H	Hyde Road	3 – 3	Browell (2), Taylor	32,000
18 October 1919	Manchester United	A	Old Trafford	0 – 1		45,000
25 October 1919	The Wednesday	H	Hyde Road	4 – 2	Browell (2), Taylor, Goodwin	20,000
1 November 1919	The Wednesday	A	Hillsborough	0 – 0		20,000
8 November 1919	Blackburn Rovers	H	Hyde Road	8 – 2	Browell (3), Barnes (2), Murphy (2), Crawshaw	25,000
15 November 1919	Blackburn Rovers	A	Ewood Park	4 – 1	Browell (2), Barnes (2)	6,000
22 November 1919	Derby County	H	Hyde Road	3 – 1	Crawshaw (2), Barnes	15,000
29 November 1919	Derby County	A	Baseball Ground	0 – 0		7,000
6 December 1919	West Bromwich Albion	H	Hyde Road	2 – 3	Browell (2)	30,000
13 December 1919	West Bromwich Albion	A	The Hawthorns	0 – 2		20,000
20 December 1919	Sunderland	A	Roker Park	1 – 2	Reid	20,000
25 December 1919	Everton	H	Hyde Road	1 – 1	Barnes	25,000
26 December 1919	Everton	A	Goodison Park	0 – 2		26,000
27 December 1919	Sunderland	H	Hyde Road	1 – 0	Murphy	30,000
1 January 1920	Bradford City	H	Hyde Road	1 – 0	Murphy	30,000
3 January 1920	Arsenal	A	Highbury	2 – 2	Murphy, Barnes	32,000
17 January 1920	Arsenal	H	Hyde Road	4 – 1	Browell (3), Goodwin	25,000
24 January 1920	Middlesbrough	H	Hyde Road	1 – 0	Browell	28,000
7 February 1920	Burnley	H	Hyde Road	3 – 1	Barnes (2), Crawshaw	30,000
14 February 1920	Burnley	A	Turf Moor	0 – 2		20,000
18 February 1920	Middlesbrough	A	Ayresome Park	2 – 0	Johnson (2)	15,000
28 February 1920	Preston North End	A	Deepdale	1 – 1	Fletcher	17,000
13 March 1920	Bradford Park Avenue	H	Hyde Road	4 – 1	Barnes (2), Johnson, Crawshaw	10,000
17 March 1920	Preston North End	H	Hyde Road	1 – 0	Godfrey	18,000
20 March 1920	Liverpool	A	Anfield	0 – 1		30,000
22 March 1920	Bradford Park Avenue	A	Park Avenue	1 – 2	Johnson	8,000
27 March 1920	Liverpool	H	Hyde Road	2 – 1	Barnes (2)	35,000
3 April 1920	Chelsea	A	Stamford Bridge	0 – 1		45,000
5 April 1920	Bradford City	A	Valley Parade	0 – 1		20,000
10 April 1920	Chelsea	H	Hyde Road	1 – 0	Barnes	25,000
17 April 1920	Newcastle United	A	St James' Park	0 – 3		36,000
24 April 1920	Newcastle United	H	Hyde Road	0 – 0		25,000
26 April 1920	Aston Villa	A	Villa Park	1 – 0	Browell	45,000
1 May 1920	Aston Villa	H	Hyde Road	2 – 2	Johnson, Barnes	23,000

=== FA Cup ===
Date	Round	Opponents	H / A	Venue	Result F – A	Scorers	Attendance
10 January 1920	First round	Clapton Orient	H	Hyde Road	4 – 1	Goodwin (2), Barnes, Murphy	25,878
31 January 1920	Second round	Leicester City	A	Filbert Street	0 – 3		23,041

== Squad statistics ==
=== Squad ===
Appearances for competitive matches only

Pos.	Name	League		FA Cup		Total	
Pos.	Name	Apps	Goals	Apps	Goals	Apps	Goals
GK	(England) Jim Goodchild	33	0	2	0	35	0
GK	(England) Walter Smith	9	0	0	0	9	0
DF	(England) Sam Cookson	20	0	2	0	22	0
DF	(England) Eli Fletcher	34	1	2	0	36	1
DF	(England) Frank Knowles	2	0	0	0	2	0
DF	(England) Max Woosnam	16	0	2	0	18	0
MF	(England) Joe Dorsett	8	0	0	0	8	0
MF	(England) Spud Murphy	36	5	2	1	38	6
FW	(England) Jack Allen	2	0	0	0	2	0
FW	(England) Horace Barnes	39	22	2	1	41	23
FW	(England) Tommy Broad	19	0	1	0	20	0
FW	(England) Tommy Browell	30	22	2	0	32	22
FW	(England) Dick Crawshaw	21	6	1	0	22	6
FW	(England) Joby Godfrey	9	1	0	0	9	1
FW	(England) Ted Hanney	7	0	0	0	7	0
FW	(England) Fred Howard	1	0	1	0	2	0
FW	(England) Tommy Johnson	10	5	0	0	10	5
FW	(England) Fred Lievesley	1	0	0	0	1	0
FW	(England) Harry Taylor	6	4	0	0	6	4
FW	(Wales) George Wynn	4	1	0	0	4	1
MF	(England) Jack Brennan	20	0	2	0	22	0
--	Joe Cartwright	6	1	0	0	6	1
--	Albert Fairclough	2	0	0	0	2	0
--	Peter Fairclough	4	0	0	0	4	0
--	Ernie Goodwin	15	2	1	2	16	4
--	George Gray	2	0	0	0	2	0
--	(Scotland) Jock Henderson	4	0	0	0	4	0
--	Billy Henry	13	0	0	0	13	0
--	Teddy Hughes	6	0	0	0	6	0
--	Harry Jarvis	1	0	0	0	1	0
--	Tommy Lamph	11	0	0	0	11	0
--	William Newton	2	0	0	0	2	0
--	Joe Reid	3	1	0	0	3	1
--	Sid Scott	12	0	0	0	12	0
--	Sammy Sharp	6	0	0	0	6	0
--	Fred Sugden	6	0	0	0	6	0
--	Herbert Tyler	41	0	2	0	43	0

=== Scorers ===
==== All ====
Scorer	Goals
(England) Horace Barnes	23
(England) Tommy Browell	22
(England) Dick Crawshaw	6
(England) Spud Murphy	6
(England) Tommy Johnson	5
Ernie Goodwin	4
(England) Harry Taylor	4
Joe Cartwright	1
(England) Eli Fletcher	1
(England) Joby Godfrey	1
Joe Reid	1
(Wales) George Wynn	1

==== League ====
Scorer	Goals
(England) Horace Barnes	22
(England) Tommy Browell	22
(England) Dick Crawshaw	6
(England) Tommy Johnson	5
(England) Spud Murphy	5
(England) Harry Taylor	4
Ernie Goodwin	2
Joe Cartwright	1
(England) Eli Fletcher	1
(England) Joby Godfrey	1
Joe Reid	1
(Wales) George Wynn	1

==== FA Cup ====
Scorer	Goals
Ernie Goodwin	2
(England) Horace Barnes	1
(England) Spud Murphy	1

== See also ==
- Manchester City F.C. seasons
