= 1913–14 Manchester City F.C. season =

English football club season

Manchester City F.C.
1913–14 season
- Manager: Ernest Mangnall
- Football League First Division: 13th
- FA Cup: Fourth round
- Top goalscorer: League: Browell (13 goals); All: Browell (14 goals); Howard (14 goals)
- Highest home attendance: 40,000 vs Blackburn Rovers (11 October 1913); 40,000 vs Manchester United (6 December 1913)
- Lowest home attendance: 15,000 vs West Bromwich Albion (25 March 1914)

The 1913–14 season was Manchester City F.C.'s twenty-third season of league football and fourth consecutive season in the First Division of English football.

== Football League First Division ==
Pos	Team	Pld	W	D	L	GF	GA	GAv	Pts
11	Newcastle United	38	13	11	14	39	48	0.813	37
12	Burnley	38	12	12	14	61	53	1.151	36
13	Manchester City	38	14	8	16	51	53	0.962	36
14	Manchester United	38	15	6	17	52	62	0.839	36
15	Everton	38	12	11	15	46	55	0.836	35

Source: World Football
Rules for classification: 1) Points; 2) Goal average; 3) Goals scored

=== Results summary ===
Overall								Home						Away					
Pld	W	D	L	GF	GA	GAv	Pts	W	D	L	GF	GA	Pts	W	D	L	GF	GA	Pts
38	14	8	16	51	53	0.962	36	9	3	7	28	23	21	5	5	9	23	30	15

Source: rsssf.com

=== Reports ===
Date	Opponents	H / A	Venue	Result F – A	Scorers	Attendance
1 September 1913	Aston Villa	A	Villa Park	1 – 1	Taylor	10,000
6 September 1913	Middlesbrough	H	Hyde Road	1 – 1	Taylor	30,000
13 September 1913	Sheffield United	A	Bramall Lane	3 – 1	Abbott, Jones, Taylor	15,000
20 September 1913	Derby County	H	Hyde Road	1 – 2	Abbott	25,000
27 September 1913	Tottenham Hotspur	A	White Hart Lane	1 – 3	Jones	30,513
4 October 1913	Bradford City	A	Valley Parade	2 – 3	Wynn (2)	20,000
11 October 1913	Blackburn Rovers	H	Hyde Road	1 – 2	Hughes	40,000
18 October 1913	Sunderland	A	Roker Park	0 – 0		28,000
25 October 1913	Everton	H	Hyde Road	1 – 1	Taylor	30,000
1 November 1913	West Bromwich Albion	A	The Hawthorns	0 – 0		12,000
8 November 1913	The Wednesday	H	Hyde Road	1 – 2	Browell	25,000
15 November 1913	Bolton Wanderers	A	Burnden Park	0 – 3		25,000
22 November 1913	Chelsea	H	Hyde Road	2 – 1	Browell, Wallace	30,000
29 November 1913	Oldham Athletic	A	Boundary Park	3 – 1	Cumming, Howard, Browell	18,000
6 December 1913	Manchester United	H	Hyde Road	0 – 2		40,000
13 December 1913	Burnley	A	Turf Moor	0 – 2		20,000
20 December 1913	Preston North End	H	Hyde Road	1 – 1	Browell	20,000
25 December 1913	Liverpool	A	Anfield	2 – 4	Howard (2)	22,000
26 December 1913	Liverpool	H	Hyde Road	1 – 0	Howard	25,000
27 December 1913	Middlesbrough	A	Ayresome Park	0 – 2		12,000
1 January 1914	Newcastle United	A	St James' Park	1 – 0	Browell	15,000
3 January 1914	Sheffield United	H	Hyde Road	2 – 1	Taylor, Browell	25,000
17 January 1914	Derby County	A	Baseball Ground	4 – 2	Howard (3), Taylor	8,000
24 January 1914	Tottenham Hotspur	H	Hyde Road	2 – 1	Cumming, Taylor	30,000
7 February 1914	Bradford City	H	Hyde Road	1 – 0	Browell	25,000
14 February 1914	Blackburn Rovers	A	Ewood Park	1 – 2	Browell	10,000
28 February 1914	Everton	A	Goodison Park	0 – 1		20,000
14 March 1914	The Wednesday	A	Hillsborough	2 – 2	Hughes, Taylor	17,000
18 March 1914	Sunderland	H	Hyde Road	3 – 1	Howard (2), Hindmarsh	20,000
21 March 1914	Bolton Wanderers	H	Hyde Road	0 – 1		30,000
25 March 1914	West Bromwich Albion	H	Hyde Road	2 – 3	A. Fairclough, Browell	15,000
28 March 1914	Chelsea	A	Stamford Bridge	0 – 1		30,000
4 April 1914	Oldham Athletic	H	Hyde Road	2 – 1	Jones (2)	25,000
10 April 1914	Aston Villa	H	Hyde Road	3 – 1	Browell (2), Dorsett	30,000
11 April 1914	Manchester United	A	Old Trafford	1 – 0	Cumming	36,440
13 April 1914	Newcastle United	H	Hyde Road	0 – 1		35,000
18 April 1914	Burnley	H	Hyde Road	4 – 1	Browell (2), Howard, Wynn	18,000
25 April 1914	Preston North End	A	Deepdale	2 – 2	Hanney, Howard	8,000

== FA Cup ==
Date	Round	Opponents	H / A	Venue	Result F – A	Scorers	Attendance
10 January 1914	First round	Fulham	H	Hyde Road	2 – 0	Hindmarsh, Howard	23,345
31 January 1914	Second round	Tottenham Hotspur	H	Hyde Road	2 – 1	Howard, Browell	16,000
21 February 1914	Third round	Blackburn Rovers	A	Ewood Park	2 – 1	Howard, Cartwright	41,250
7 March 1914	Fourth round	Sheffield United	H	Hyde Road	0 – 0		35,000
12 March 1914	Fourth round replay	Sheffield United	A	Bramall Lane	0 – 0		46,139
16 March 1914	Fourth round second replay	Sheffield United	N	Villa Park	0 – 1		23,000

== Squad statistics ==
=== Squad ===
Appearances for competitive matches only

Pos.	Name	League		FA Cup		Total	
Pos.	Name	Apps	Goals	Apps	Goals	Apps	Goals
GK	(England) Jim Goodchild	2	0	0	0	2	0
GK	(England) Walter Smith	36	0	6	0	42	0
DF	(England) Eli Fletcher	36	0	6	0	42	0
MF	(England) Joe Dorsett	17	1	0	0	17	1
MF	(England) Sid Hoad	5	0	0	0	5	0
MF	(England) Tom Holford	15	0	0	0	15	0
FW	(England) James Abbott	3	2	0	0	3	2
FW	(England) Tommy Browell	27	13	6	1	27	14
FW	(England) Ted Hanney	24	1	6	0	30	1
FW	(England) Jimmy Hindmarsh	24	1	6	1	30	2
FW	(England) Fred Howard	29	11	6	3	35	14
FW	(Wales) Lot Jones	14	4	1	0	15	4
FW	(England) Harry Taylor	27	8	0	0	27	8
FW	(Wales) George Wynn	12	3	0	0	12	3
--	Bill Bottomley	11	0	0	0	11	0
--	Joe Cartwright	9	0	5	1	14	1
--	Cumming	23	3	5	0	28	3
--	(Scotland) Bill Eadie	6	0	0	0	6	0
--	Albert Fairclough	2	1	0	0	2	1
--	William Garner	2	0	0	0	2	0
--	Billy Henry	33	0	6	0	39	0
--	(Wales) Edwin Hughes	30	2	6	0	36	2
--	Peter McGuire	6	0	0	0	6	0
--	Joe Spotiswood	6	0	0	0	6	0
--	Len Wall	4	0	0	0	4	0
--	William Wallace	15	1	1	0	16	1

=== Scorers ===
==== All ====
Scorer	Goals
(England) Tommy Browell	14
(England) Fred Howard	14
(England) Harry Taylor	8
(Wales) Lot Jones	4
Cumming	3
(Wales) George Wynn	3
(England) James Abbott	2
(England) Jimmy Hindmarsh	2
Edwin Hughes	2
Joe Cartwright	1
(England) Joe Dorsett	1
Albert Fairclough	1
(England) Ted Hanney	1
William Wallace	1

==== League ====
Scorer	Goals
(England) Tommy Browell	13
(England) Fred Howard	11
(England) Harry Taylor	8
(Wales) Lot Jones	4
Cumming	3
(Wales) George Wynn	3
(England) James Abbott	2
Edwin Hughes	2
(England) Joe Dorsett	1
Albert Fairclough	1
(England) Ted Hanney	1
(England) Jimmy Hindmarsh	1
William Wallace	1

==== FA Cup ====
Scorer	Goals
(England) Fred Howard	3
(England) Tommy Browell	1
Joe Cartwright	1
(England) Jimmy Hindmarsh	1

== See also ==
- Manchester City F.C. seasons
