= 1914–15 Manchester City F.C. season =

English football club season

Manchester City F.C.
1914–15 season
- Manager: Ernest Mangnall
- Football League First Division: 5th
- FA Cup: Third round
- Top goalscorer: League: Howard (18 goals); All: Howard (18 goals)
- Highest home attendance: 40,000 vs Oldham Athletic (5 April 1915)
- Lowest home attendance: 7,000 vs Bradford Park Avenue (19 December 1914)
Home colours

The 1914–15 season was Manchester City F.C.'s 24th season om football league and 5th consecutive season in the First Division of English football. With the start of the First World War, it was to be the last season of regular league football until 1919. In the intervening years, all teams played in the War Leagues, which were non-competitive and are considered to be null in club history.

== Football League First Division ==
Pos	Team	Pld	W	D	L	GF	GA	GAv	Pts
3	Blackburn Rovers	38	18	7	13	83	61	1.361	43
4	Burnley	38	18	7	13	61	47	1.298	43
5	Manchester City	38	15	13	10	49	39	1.256	43
6	Sheffield United	38	15	13	10	49	41	1.195	43
7	The Wednesday	38	15	13	10	61	54	1.130	43

Source: World Football
Rules for classification: 1) Points; 2) Goal average; 3) Goals scored

=== Results summary ===
Overall								Home						Away					
Pld	W	D	L	GF	GA	GAv	Pts	W	D	L	GF	GA	Pts	W	D	L	GF	GA	Pts
38	15	13	10	49	39	1.256	43	9	7	3	29	15	25	6	6	7	20	24	18

Source: rsssf.com

=== Reports ===
Date	Opponents	H / A	Venue	Result F – A	Scorers	Attendance
1 September 1914	Bradford City	H	Hyde Road	4 – 1	Taylor, Howard, Barnes, Dorsett	9,000
5 September 1914	Manchester United	A	Old Trafford	0 – 0		20,000
12 September 1914	Burnley	H	Hyde Road	1 – 0	Howard	10,000
19 September 1914	Bolton Wanderers	A	Burnden Park	3 – 2	Howard, Barnes, ? (o.g.)	20,000
26 September 1914	Tottenham Hotspur	H	Hyde Road	2 – 1	Taylor, Howard	20,000
3 October 1914	Blackburn Rovers	A	Ewood Park	1 – 0	Cartwright	22,000
10 October 1914	Newcastle United	H	Hyde Road	1 – 1	Barnes	24,000
17 October 1914	Notts County	A	Meadow Lane	2 – 0	Howard (2)	14,000
24 October 1914	Middlesbrough	H	Hyde Road	1 – 1	Howard	25,000
31 October 1914	Sunderland	A	Roker Park	2 – 0	Howard (2)	10,000
7 November 1914	Sheffield United	H	Hyde Road	0 – 0		25,000
14 November 1914	The Wednesday	A	Hillsborough	1 – 2	Taylor	24,000
25 November 1914	Aston Villa	H	Hyde Road	1 – 0	Howard	16,000
28 November 1914	West Bromwich Albion	A	The Hawthorns	1 – 0	Browell	10,000
5 December 1914	Liverpool	H	Hyde Road	1 – 1	Howard	12,000
12 December 1914	Everton	A	Goodison Park	1 – 4	Howard	20,000
19 December 1914	Bradford Park Avenue	H	Hyde Road	2 – 3	Taylor, Howard	7,000
25 December 1914	Chelsea	A	Stamford Bridge	0 – 0		15,000
26 December 1914	Chelsea	H	Hyde Road	2 – 1	Taylor, Howard	25,000
1 January 1915	Oldham Athletic	A	Boundary Park	0 – 0		22,000
2 January 1915	Manchester United	H	Hyde Road	1 – 1	Howard	30,000
18 January 1915	Burnley	A	Turf Moor	2 – 1	Dorsett, Barnes	8,000
23 January 1915	Bolton Wanderers	H	Hyde Road	2 – 1	Taylor, Barnes	20,000
6 February 1915	Blackburn Rovers	H	Hyde Road	1 – 3	Taylor	25,000
13 February 1915	Newcastle United	A	St James' Park	1 – 2	Taylor	18,000
22 February 1915	Notts County	H	Hyde Road	0 – 0		20,000
27 February 1915	Middlesbrough	A	Ayresome Park	0 – 1		8,000
6 March 1915	Sunderland	H	Hyde Road	2 – 0	Cartwright, ? (o.g.)	20,000
13 March 1915	Liverpool	A	Anfield	2 – 3	Barnes, Howard	20,000
15 March 1915	Tottenham Hotspur	A	White Hart Lane	2 – 2	Taylor, Barnes	7,000
20 March 1915	The Wednesday	H	Hyde Road	4 – 0	Howard (2), Barnes (2)	20,000
29 March 1915	Sheffield United	A	Bramall Lane	0 – 0		18,000
3 April 1915	West Bromwich Albion	H	Hyde Road	4 – 0	Taylor (2), Barnes (2)	15,000
5 April 1915	Oldham Athletic	H	Hyde Road	0 – 0		40,000
6 April 1915	Bradford City	A	Valley Parade	0 – 0		15,000
17 April 1915	Everton	H	Hyde Road	0 – 1		30,000
21 April 1915	Aston Villa	A	Villa Park	1 – 4	Barnes	8,000
24 April 1915	Bradford Park Avenue	A	Park Avenue	1 – 3	Jones	12,000

== FA Cup ==
Date	Round	Opponents	H / A	Venue	Result F – A	Scorers	Attendance
9 January 1915	First round	Preston North End	A	Deepdale	0 – 0		14,000
16 January 1915	First round replay	Preston North End	H	Hyde Road	3 – 0	Barnes (2), Hughes	19,985
30 January 1915	Second round	Aston Villa	H	Hyde Road	1 – 0	Cartwright	29,661
20 February 1915	Third round	Chelsea	H	Hyde Road	0 – 1		32,000

== Squad statistics ==
=== Squad ===
Appearances for competitive matches only

Pos.	Name	League		FA Cup		Total	
Pos.	Name	Apps	Goals	Apps	Goals	Apps	Goals
GK	(England) Jim Goodchild	1	0	0	0	1	0
GK	(England) Walter Smith	37	0	4	0	41	0
DF	(England) Eli Fletcher	37	0	4	0	41	0
MF	(England) Joe Dorsett	18	2	3	0	21	2
MF	(England) Sid Hoad	6	0	0	0	6	0
FW	(England) Horace Barnes	25	12	4	2	29	14
FW	(England) Tommy Browell	10	1	2	0	12	1
FW	(England) Ted Hanney	37	0	4	0	41	0
FW	(England) Jimmy Hindmarsh	4	0	1	0	5	0
FW	(England) Fred Howard	33	18	3	0	36	18
FW	(Wales) Lot Jones	17	1	1	0	18	1
FW	(England) Harry Taylor	35	11	3	0	38	11
FW	(Wales) George Wynn	1	0	0	0	1	0
--	Bill Bottomley	1	0	0	0	1	0
--	Jack Brennan	33	0	2	0	35	0
--	Joe Cartwright	21	2	4	1	25	3
--	Cumming	12	0	1	0	13	0
--	Albert Fairclough	1	0	0	0	1	0
--	Peter Fairclough	1	0	0	0	1	0
--	William Garner	1	0	0	0	1	0
DF	(England) Peter Gartland	1	0	0	0	1	0
FW	(England) Billy Gaughan	10	0	0	0	10	0
--	Jack Hall	1	0	0	0	1	0
--	(Scotland) Jock Henderson	1	0	0	0	1	0
--	Billy Henry	35	0	4	0	39	0
DF	(Wales) Edwin Hughes	36	0	4	1	40	1
--	Peter McGuire	3	0	0	0	3	0

=== Scorers ===
==== All ====
Scorer	Goals
(England) Fred Howard	18
(England) Horace Barnes	14
(England) Harry Taylor	11
Joe Cartwright	3
(England) Joe Dorsett	2
(England) Tommy Browell	1
Edwin Hughes	1
(Wales) Lot Jones	1

==== League ====
Scorer	Goals
(England) Fred Howard	18
(England) Horace Barnes	12
(England) Harry Taylor	11
Joe Cartwright	2
(England) Joe Dorsett	2
(England) Tommy Browell	1
(Wales) Lot Jones	1

==== FA Cup ====
Scorer	Goals
(England) Horace Barnes	2
Joe Cartwright	1
Edwin Hughes	1

== See also ==
- Manchester City F.C. seasons
