= Bill Bottomley =

English footballer

Personal information
- Full name: William Bottomley
- Date of birth: 4 June 1886
- Place of birth: Mossley, England
- Date of death: 8 May 1958 (aged 71)
- Place of death: Greenfield, England
- Height: 5 ft 8 in (1.73 m)
- Position: Wing half

Senior career*
| Years | Team | Apps | (Gls) |
- Delph
- Roaches
| 1903–1904 | Greenfield Athletic | | |
| 1904–1905 | Edgehill | | |
| 1905–1906 | Mossley Britannia | | |
| 1906–1907 | Failsworth | | |
| 1907–1908 | Oldham Athletic | 13 | (0) |
| 1908–1919 | Manchester City | 98 | (2) |
- * Club domestic league appearances and goals

William Bottomley (4 June 1886 – 8 May 1958) was an English professional footballer who played as a wing half in the Football League for Manchester City and Oldham Athletic.

== Career ==
After beginning his career in non-League football, Bottomley joined Second Division club Oldham Athletic in 1907. After 13 appearances, he moved up to the First Division to join Manchester City in May 1908 and remained at Hyde Road for seven seasons, making 103 appearances and scoring two goals. He continued to guest for the club during the First World War.

== Personal life ==
Bottomley served as a private in the Army Service Corps during the First World War. He was twice married and had seven children. Bottomley served in the Home Guard during the Second World War.

== Career statistics ==
Appearances and goals by club, season and competition
| Club | Season | League | | | FA Cup | | Total | |
| Club | Season | Division | Apps | Goals | Apps | Goals | Apps | Goals |
|---|---|---|---|---|---|---|---|---|
| Oldham Athletic | 1907–08 | Second Division | 13 | 0 | 0 | 0 | 13 | 0 |
| Manchester City | 1908–09 | First Division | 1 | 0 | 0 | 0 | 1 | 0 |
| Manchester City | 1909–10 | Second Division | 14 | 0 | 4 | 0 | 18 | 0 |
| Manchester City | 1910–11 | First Division | 19 | 0 | 0 | 0 | 19 | 0 |
| Manchester City | 1911–12 | First Division | 19 | 1 | 0 | 0 | 19 | 1 |
| Manchester City | 1912–13 | First Division | 33 | 1 | 1 | 0 | 34 | 1 |
| Manchester City | 1913–14 | First Division | 11 | 0 | 0 | 0 | 11 | 0 |
| Manchester City | 1914–15 | First Division | 1 | 0 | 0 | 0 | 1 | 0 |
| Manchester City | Total | | 98 | 2 | 5 | 0 | 103 | 2 |
| Career total | | | 111 | 2 | 5 | 0 | 116 | 2 |

== Honours ==
Manchester City

- Football League Second Division: 1909–10
