= Frederick Howard =

Frederick or Fred Howard may refer to:

== Politics ==
- Frederick Howard, 5th Earl of Carlisle (1748–1825), English diplomat
- Frederick John Howard (1814–1897), British member of parliament for Youghal
- Frederick George Howard (1805–1834), British member of parliament for Morpeth
- Lord Frederick Howard (1684–1727), English politician who sat in the Irish House of Commons

== Sports ==
- Frederic Howard (1895–1933), English footballer active in the 1920s with Derby County, Gillingham and Ayr United
- Fred Howard (Australian footballer) (1878–1942), Australian rules footballer
- Fred Howard (footballer, born 1893) (1893–?), English footballer active in the 1910s and 1920s
- Fred Howard (baseball) (born 1956), American baseball player

== Other ==
- Frederick Howard (industrialist) (1827–1915), British industrialist
- Frederick Howard (British Army officer) (1785–1815), fought in the Napoleonic Wars and was killed at the Battle of Waterloo
