= Paddy McGuire (footballer) =

English footballer

Personal information
- Full name: Patrick McGuire
- Date of birth: 1889
- Place of birth: Manchester, England
- Date of death: October 1916 (aged 26–27)
- Place of death: near Flers, France
- Position: Full-back

Senior career*
Years	Team	Apps	(Gls)
1909–1912	Hurst		
1911–1912	Manchester United	0	(0)
1912–1915	Manchester City	15	(0)
1915–1916	Grimsby Town	31	(6)
- * Club domestic league appearances and goals

Patrick McGuire (1889 – 12 October 1916) was an English professional footballer who played in the Football League for Manchester City as a full-back.

== Personal life ==
Son of Martin and Bridget McGuire, McGuire attended Corpus Christi School, Miles Platting and Woodhouses School, Failsworth. He was a bricklayer by trade. In May 1915, almost one year into the First World War, McGuire enlisted as a private in the Manchester Regiment. McGuire was killed while attacking a German trench system near Flers, France on 12 October 1916, during the Battle of the Somme, aged reportedly 28, leaving a widow, Maria. He is commemorated on the Thiepval Memorial.

== Career statistics ==
Appearances and goals by club, season and competition
Club	Season	League			FA Cup		Total	
Club	Season	Division	Apps	Goals	Apps	Goals	Apps	Goals
Manchester City	1912–13	First Division	6	0	0	0	6	0
Manchester City	1913–14	First Division	6	0	0	0	6	0
Manchester City	1914–15	First Division	3	0	0	0	3	0
Career total			15	0	0	0	15	0
