= Walter Smith (footballer, born 1884) =

English footballer

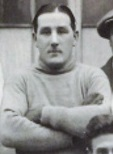
- Smith in a Port Vale squad photo in 1920

Personal information
- Full name: Walter Ernest Smith
- Date of birth: 25 March 1884
- Place of birth: Leicester, England
- Date of death: 1972 (aged 87–88)
- Height: 5 ft 9 in (1.75 m)
- Position: Goalkeeper

Youth career
- Leicester Imperial

Senior career*
Years	Team	Apps	(Gls)
1903–1906	Leicester Fosse	79	(0)
1906–1920	Manchester City	232	(0)
1920–1922	Port Vale	41	(0)
1922	Plymouth Argyle	0	(0)
1922–1923	Grimsby Town	10	(0)
Total		362	(0)
- * Club domestic league appearances and goals

Walter Ernest Smith (25 March 1884 – 1972) was an English football goalkeeper who played for Leicester Fosse and Manchester City before World War I, and played for Port Vale, Plymouth Argyle, and Grimsby Town after the war. He helped Manchester City to win the Second Division title in 1909–10.

== Career ==
Smith played for Leicester Imperial and Leicester Fosse before joining Manchester City for £600 in June 1906. He made 22 First Division and two FA Cup appearances in 1906–07. He was then an ever-present in the 44 game 1907–08 campaign, as the "Citizens" finished third in the league, some nine points behind rivals Manchester United. He featured 39 times in the 1908–09 relegation season. He only played three games, however, in the 1909–10 campaign, as City won promotion as champions of the Second Division. He then won back his first-team place at Hyde Road, playing 33 matches in the 1910–11 season. He featured just 12 times in 1911–12, as he shared goalkeeping duties with Augustus Beeby and Jim Goodchild. He featured just 13 times in the 1912–13 season, as Goodchild established himself as the club's preferred stopper. Smith regained his place in 1913–14, missing just two of City's 44 matches. He played 41 games in 1914–15, in the last season before World War I put a temporary halt to the Football League. He made 13 appearances in the 1915–16, 1916–17, and 1918–19 wartime leagues. He also guested for Fulham and Leicester Fosse during the war. At the end of hostilities, Goodchild became City's number one, and Smith was limited to nine appearances in 1919–20.

He joined Second Division Port Vale in October 1920 for a 'modest' fee. However, the morning of his debut game on South Shields on 23 October he was arrested on assault charges against a chambermaid at the hotel where the team had spent the night. After being released on bail, he played the game with a detective standing in the crowd, possibly distracting the team as they went on to lose 6–1. He was found not guilty at his trial in November 1920 and went on to have a successful career with the club. He featured 29 times in the 1920–21 season, ahead of back-up goalkeepers Alfred Bourne and Jonathan Hammond. He played 13 games in the 1921–22 campaign before he seriously injured his leg in a 4–1 defeat by Coventry City at Highfield Road on 31 December. Teddy Peers was signed to take his place. Smith failed to regain his first-team place upon his recovery. He was released at the end of the season, but despite being 38, he did not retire. Instead he moved on to Plymouth Argyle and later turned out for Grimsby Town.

== Career statistics ==
Appearances and goals by club, season and competition
Club	Season	League			FA Cup		Total	
Club	Season	Division	Apps	Goals	Apps	Goals	Apps	Goals
Leicester Fosse	1903–04	Second Division	10	0	0	0	10	0
Leicester Fosse	1904–05	Second Division	31	0	7	0	38	0
Leicester Fosse	1905–06	Second Division	38	0	1	0	39	0
Leicester Fosse	Total		79	0	8	0	87	0
Manchester City	1906–07	First Division	22	0	2	0	24	0
Manchester City	1907–08	First Division	38	0	6	0	44	0
Manchester City	1908–09	First Division	34	0	1	0	35	0
Manchester City	1909–10	Second Division	3	0	0	0	3	0
Manchester City	1910–11	First Division	31	0	2	0	33	0
Manchester City	1911–12	First Division	12	0	0	0	12	0
Manchester City	1912–13	First Division	10	0	2	0	12	0
Manchester City	1913–14	First Division	36	0	6	0	42	0
Manchester City	1914–15	First Division	37	0	4	0	41	0
Manchester City	1919–20	First Division	9	0	0	0	9	0
Manchester City	Total		232	0	23	0	255	0
Port Vale	1920–21	Second Division	28	0	1	0	29	0
Port Vale	1921–22	Second Division	13	0	0	0	13	0
Port Vale	Total		41	0	1	0	42	0
Plymouth Argyle	1922–23	Third Division South	0	0	0	0	0	0
Grimsby Town	1922–23	Third Division North	10	0	0	0	10	0
Career total			362	0	32	0	394	0

== Honours ==
Manchester City

- Football League Second Division: 1909–10
