= Fred Parker (footballer, born 1893) =

English footballer

Personal information
- Date of birth: 23 October 1893
- Place of birth: Seaham, England
- Height: 5 ft 11 in (1.80 m)
- Position: Half-back

Youth career
- Seaham Albion
- Seaham Harbour

Senior career*
Years	Team	Apps	(Gls)
1914	Manchester City	0	(0)
1919–1925	Nottingham Forest	157	(6)
1926	Southport	0	(0)
Total		157	(6)
- * Club domestic league appearances and goals

Fred Parker (born 23 October 1893) was an English footballer who played as a half-back for Manchester City, Nottingham Forest, and Southport. He helped Forest to win the Second Division title in 1921–22.

== Career ==
Parker played for local non-League sides Seaham Albion and Seaham Harbour before getting his big break with Manchester City of the Football League in 1914. He featured 18 times in 1916–17 and 1918–19. World War I greatly disrupted his career, seeing him guest for Port Vale, Stoke (playing five games in 1918–19) and Chesterfield in 1919.

== Career statistics ==
Appearances and goals by club, season and competition
Club	Season	League			FA Cup		Total	
Club	Season	Division	Apps	Goals	Apps	Goals	Apps	Goals
Manchester City	1914–15	First Division	0	0	0	0	0	0
Nottingham Forest	1919–20	Second Division	35	1	1	0	36	1
Nottingham Forest	1920–21	Second Division	32	1	2	0	34	1
Nottingham Forest	1921–22	Second Division	40	1	3	0	43	1
Nottingham Forest	1922–23	First Division	28	0	1	0	29	0
Nottingham Forest	1923–24	First Division	12	3	0	0	12	3
Nottingham Forest	1924–25	First Division	6	0	0	0	6	0
Nottingham Forest	1925–26	Second Division	4	0	0	0	4	0
Nottingham Forest	Total		157	6	7	0	164	6
Southport	1926–27	Third Division North	0	0	0	0	0	0
Career total			157	6	7	0	164	6
