= Early grounds of Manchester City F.C. =

History of an English football club

Before Manchester City Football Club moved into their first permanent home in Manchester, England, in 1887, the club played at a short series of grounds which ranged from established cricket venues to bumpy fields with no stands or boundaries nor history of sporting usage. The club was founded as a philanthropic endeavour to encourage impressionable youths to commit to wholesome activities rather than falling to the local adolescent culture of alcohol and violence. The sport of football was barely 15 years from the writing of its own rulebook. The club had no immediate option of using or constructing a stadium, and thus most of their first locations were nothing more than painted lines and goalposts. As the club reformed and changed its name twice between 1880 and 1887, so its choice of locations were a series of low-cost, short-term solutions when their current location became untenable. In 1887, when City moved to their sixth pitch in only eight years, they had the money, ambition, reputation and stability to construct themselves a more permanent base of operations, at the stadium named Hyde Road.

== "Near Clowes Street" (1880–81) ==
nr. Clowes Street
- Location: Wenlock Way, Gorton Manchester
- Operator: St Mark's church, Gorton
- Capacity: Unrestricted

Tenants
- St Mark's (West Gorton) (1880–81); St Mark's Cricket Club (1875–18??)

City's first recorded game was played on 13 November 1880 under the guise of St Mark's (West Gorton). The name represented their recent founding as a church youth social group and their home district in an era when football was just beginning to boom in popularity; the proliferation of local amateur teams led to the practice of appending home locations onto teams' names to avoid confusion. Although 13 November game is regarded by many as the first game in City's history, a lack of evidence means that it is possible that other games were played before this date.

St Mark's' first (recorded) opponents were another church team representing the Baptist church in Macclesfield, with the score finishing 2–1 to the visitors. The match is also particularly notable as both teams fielded 12 players. Additionally, each fielded a 13th player as "umpire", the rules of football dictating then that each team nominate an umpire to command half of the pitch, holding a flag which he raised if he agreed with any player protest, the referee standing on the touchline as final arbiter and timekeeper. As befitted football pitches of the time, the goalposts were flimsy wooden posts with the crossbar being simply a tape tied between the posts.

The location chosen for the football team's first games was essentially an area of unused waste land known in records to be "near Clowes Street", and picked as it was also the location that the St Mark's cricket teams played. Many players played both sports for the church and, alternated as the seasonal weather dictated. The land had also been the frequent site of many illicit late-night wrestling and boxing matches, which, according to football historian Gary James, would have synergised with the church leaders who sought to harness the energy and boredom of the local men and turn them away from violent pastimes, offering the opportunity to re-appropriate the very land on which the travesties were being committed and re-sanctifying it with more wholesome and holy pursuits.

A further eight (known) games were played during the season, with the St Mark's men failing to score their first win until their final game, though this came against Stalybridge Clarence, who could only field eight men and had to recruit from the spectators.

The loose organisation of the early incarnation of the club means records of Manchester City's first ground are patchy, uncertain and in some places contradictory. The exact location of the pitch is unknown. Gary James notes that, the new team being a church initiative and a local social group, the first pitch was surely picked for its proximity to the St Mark's church in West Gorton, though the first documented match report claimed it was held in Longsight – presumably since that was the location of the rectory for the church.

The Book of Football (1905) mentions the pitch used for the club's first ever game, but going only so far as to say that by 1905 the pitch had been built upon by the Brooks and Doxey's Union Ironworks – still enough information to narrow down its location to somewhere roughly north of St Mark's church along what is now Wenlock Way. Repeated attempts at identifying the precise location have been unsuccessful.

== Kirkmanshulme Cricket Club (1881–82) ==
Kirkmanshulme Cricket Club
- Location: Redgate Lane, Gorton Manchester
- Owner: Kirkmanshulme Cricket Club
- Operator: Kirkmanshulme Cricket Club
- Capacity: Unknown
- Acreage: 5 acres

Tenants
- Kirkmanshulme Cricket Club (18??–1???); St Mark's (West Gorton) (1881–82)

Having achieved a successful end to their first season, the decision was made in mid-1881 that a more suitable base of operations was required than the simple open ground of the previous year, where one match report had highlighted the unevenness of the surface had caused repeated trips and accidents. The location then chosen was Kirkmanshulme CC pitch near the Belle Vue Zoological Gardens, and St Mark's would have benefited further from the cricket club's facilities, even if minimal. The first match played at the new ground was against Hurst Clarence (Ashton-under-Lyne), and although the final score was 3–0 in favour of the Ashton team, it would prove to be St Mark's' first and only recorded defeat in their new home.

The new ground was not notable for much during the season although it was here that the first home meeting would occur between the clubs which would go on to become vitriolic rivals Manchester City and Manchester United. The latter were then under the guise "Newton Heath LYR F.C." and in only their own fourth season since being founded by workers of the Lancashire and Yorkshire Railway. The first meeting of any sort between the two had occurred the previous November, with St Mark's losing 3–0, but on 4 March 1882 a reported 5,000 spectators witnessed St Mark's avenge themselves on the Heathens, emerging victorious by a score of two goals to one.

The Newton Heath match was St Mark's' last known game at their second ground, as they were asked to vacate the ground after playing only five home games there. Though no exact reason for this expulsion survives, Gary James mentions that it is likely due to the damage to the grass caused by football boots and the large crowd attending the previous game.

== Queens Road/"Clemington Park" (1882–84) ==
Queens Road
- Clemington Park; Clemington Downs
- Location: Queens Road, Gorton, Manchester
- Operator: St Mark's (West Gorton)
- Capacity: Unrestricted

Tenants
- St Mark's (West Gorton) F.C. (1882–83); West Gorton Association F.C. (1883–84); West Gorton Athletic F.C. (1884–85)

Having been turfed out of their previous ground, St Mark's proceeded to set themselves up on a plot of land off Queens Road. Although the state of the land was not far greater than that of their first land near Clowes Street, match reports – written and submitted by an official of the club – referred to the land as both Clemington Park and Clemington Downs, although these names appear to be fanciful at best as no proof exists that these names were used for the land in any other setting or by any other group.

It is around this time that information on the history of the club itself becomes a little hazy again, as the church team merged with another local club by the name of Belle Vue Rangers F.C. in 1884, though much evidence written a generation later claims that this unison of two local teams actually happened a year earlier. Matters are confused further as this evidence also claims that Belle Vue were the original occupants of the site, though this seems unlikely. The confusion is not helped by the fact that several St Mark's players were also turning out for Belle Vue by this point, not least St Mark's founder member Walter Chew, who was serving as Rangers' captain but would remain with the Gorton church side and went to be highly influential as their club secretary.

The first game played on St Mark's' third pitch was played on 28 October 1882 against Bentfield (Greenfield), and in keeping with the tradition so far established, the church team lost their first game, this time by two goals to nil. Notably, neither team could muster a full side, with Bentfield the more disadvantaged when they ran out with only nine men to St Mark's' ten. In fact this presaged a trend for the Gorton club, as match reports show that they frequently failed to field eleven players during the season, Gary James suggesting that this perhaps indicated the need for the merger with Belle Vue Rangers. Appropriately, St Mark's struggled for form all season, winning a solitary game – again, their final one of the season.

Unlike the previous two seasons, however, the end of the season was not followed by the need to find a new pitch, in spite of the merger with Belle Vue. The club reconstituted itself as West Gorton Association Football Club, drawing up fixtures largely against the teams which St Mark's had been playing the previous season, as opposed to the calibre that Belle Vue had faced – though at this stage in the club's existence the difference in standard was small. The season saw West Gorton prove more successful on the pitch than its previous incarnations, winning their first four home games and not losing a single match at the Queens Road ground all season, scoring four times more goals than they conceded on home territory.

The winning formula on the pitch seemed to have the opposite effect off it, however, and after a single season together the two former clubs once again parted ways. The old St Mark's players took the name Gorton Association Football Club and left to take up occupancy on a new pitch on Pink Bank Lane. The former Belle Vue Rangers contingent briefly kept the ground and the West Gorton Association F.C. name before renaming themselves West Gorton Athletic F.C., vacating the premises to move to land near the Gorton Brook Hotel.

== Pink Bank Lane (1884–85) ==
Pink Bank Lane
- Location: Pink Bank Lane, Longsight, Manchester
- Operator: Gorton A.F.C.
- Capacity: Unrestricted

Tenant
- Gorton A.F.C. (1884–85)

Having left their former partners behind, the newly named Gorton A.F.C. once more took up residence on waste land, this time a patch on Pink Bank Lane, as recommended to them by striker and future manager and chairman Lawrence Furniss. Rent was agreed at £6 per year and the first recorded fixture on home soil was in fact played by the new club's 2nd XI, which beat Eccles 2nd XI 4–2. A week later, the first team inaugurated the pitch themselves with a 4–0 victory over rivals Gorton Villa F.C.

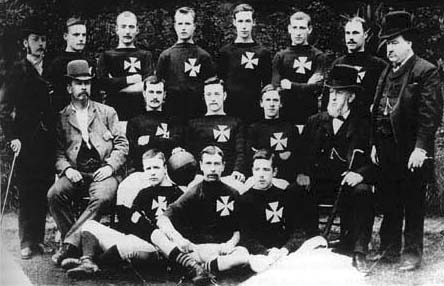
Gorton A.F.C. wearing their now-famous black shirts with cross pattée during the 1884–85 season. William Beastow, who gave the club the shirts, is reputedly the man on the far right

The season also saw the formation of the Manchester & District Football Association, the organisation that was to become the present-day Manchester FA, and Gorton A.F.C. swiftly applied to join. Although no league football was entertained by the Gorton club – and indeed, they wouldn't enter a league system for another six seasons – the club did get its first taste of competitive football at Pink Bank Lane, with entry into the Manchester & District Challenge Cup, later to be known as the Manchester Senior Cup, and a competition in which Manchester City's reserve team continues to compete in with a history of lifting the trophy every few years. In 1884, however, Gorton's taste of cup football ended swiftly with a 1–0 loss in the First Round to Dalton Hall (Owens College) F.C. For the next several seasons, cup football would prove a tough nut to crack for the Gorton club.

The season spent at Pink Bank Lane also saw witness to the use of the black shirt with cross pattée on the left breast. Though this was not the first kit that a Manchester City team ever wore, it remains both the first one for which pictographic records (indeed, for which any definite records) still exist and also remains one of the most popular and legendary kits among Manchester City fans, despite neither the black/white combination nor the cross pattée having ever been worn since. It is not known exactly when the shirts were first worn, though they were presented before the first recorded games of the season.

The last recorded match played at the ground was a 24 January fixture against Manchester Clifford F.C., which Gorton won 3–0, though it is known that several more games of the same season were played for which no records now exist. During the following season, a £2 payment was received by the club in compensation for the loss of their playing field, Gary James pointing out that this surely was due recompense for the fact that – for reasons now no longer known but beyond the club's control – the land was made unavailable for use, and for the fourth time in five years a move to a new pitch was required.

== The Bull's Head Hotel (1885–87) ==
Bull's Head Hotel land
- Location: Reddish Lane, Gorton, Manchester
- Owner: The Bull's Head Hotel
- Operator: Gorton A.F.C.
- Capacity: Unrestricted

Tenant
- Gorton A.F.C. (1885–87)

After yet another period spent searching for an appropriate playing surface, Gorton negotiated a deal with the proprietors of the Bull's Head Hotel on Reddish Lane to rent land on their property, with the added benefit of using the hotel as a changing room; the total sum for this deal was recorded at £4 17s 6d a year. The first game on their new pitch was a 3 October 1885 game against Earlstown which ended a goal apiece, the first victory coming a month later in a match against Manchester Clifford.

While Gorton fell at the first hurdle again in the Manchester & District Challenge Cup in 1885, the following season would see witness to Gorton's first competitive win, a 5–1 home victory against West Gorton Athletic – the very same team they had merged with and then separated from not two years previous. The win was a strong result, it was no preparation for the Second Round, which Gorton lost 11–1 away to Newton Heath, proving the need to strengthen through competitive success rather than continuing to compete only at a friendly level.

Locational instability returned yet again at the end of the 1886–87 season when the landlord of the Bull's Head Hotel increased the rental charge for use of the hotel's land, forcing Gorton once more to prematurely move base. Finally, however, with this move the club would find a base at which it could plant long-term roots when it set up on new premises in Ardwick, on an area of land along Hyde Road.
