= George Lockhart =

George Lockhart may refer to:

- Sir George Lockhart, Lord Carnwath (c. 1630–1689), Scottish lawyer and judge
- George Lockhart (footballer) (1877–?), Scottish footballer
- George Lockhart (politician) (1673–1731), Scottish writer, politician and spy
- George Lockhart of Tarbrax (died 1658), Commissioner for Glasgow in the Scottish Parliament
- George Claude Lockhart (1885–1979), ringmaster
- George Edward Lockhart (1902–1991), politician in Ontario, Canada
- George William Lockhart (1849–1904), elephant trainer

== See also ==
- George Lockhart Rives
- George Lokert (1485–1547), Scottish philosopher
