= Failsworth A.F.C. =

Former association football club in Lancashire)

- Full name: Failsworth Association Football Club
- Founded: 1884
- Dissolved: 1908
- Ground: Walmlsey Brow
Home colours

Failsworth A.F.C. was an association football club from Failsworth, Greater Manchester, active before the First World War.

== History ==
The earliest reference to the club is from 1885, although it appears to have been active for the season beforehand. A Failsworth F.C. had been in existence since 1880 playing under the rugby union code.

The club was one of three out of nine applicants to succeed in being elected to the Manchester League for 1901–02, and remained in the competition until 1904–05, usually finishing mid-table. It was one of seven clubs which applied for one of the five available places in the Lancashire Combination Second Division for the 1905–06 season, but (along with Little Hulton United) missed out. However the club was ultimately invited to take over the fixtures of Turton, which resigned before the season started.

The lateness of the club's accession to the higher standard of football came too late to enter the FA Cup in 1905, but Failsworth did enter the qualifying rounds in 1906–07 and 1907–08, both times losing at the first time of asking; on the former occasion 1–0 at Buxton, on the latter 3–1 at Haslingden, having sold home advantage for £15.

In the League, Failsworth recorded mid-table finishes in 1905–06 and 1906–07, but in 1907–08 dropped into the bottom three, obliging the club to seek re-election to the Combination for the following season. The club did not in fact make the application, and instead closed down, the few shillings left in the club account being handed over to the Failsworth District Sick Nursing Association.

== Colours ==
The club wore red and white stripes.

== Ground ==
The club's ground was at Walmsley Brow. It was bought in 1894 by one Frederick Keeble, as an investment, but it proved disastrous for him, as the cost bankrupted him.

== Notable players ==
- Samuel Eyres, who also played for the Third Manchester Volunteers while on Failsworth's books, until securing a trial and move to Manchester City in 1907.
- Bill Bottomley, forward, who joined Oldham Athletic from Failsworth in 1907.
