= Fred Howard (footballer, born 1893) =

English footballer

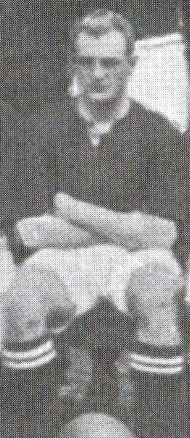
- Howard in a Port Vale squad photo in 1923

Personal information
- Date of birth: 1893
- Place of birth: Walkden, England
- Height: 5 ft 10 1/2 in (1.79 m)
- Position: Centre-forward

Youth career
- Walkden Wednesday

Senior career*
| Years | Team | Apps | (Gls) |
| 1912–1919 | Manchester City | 79 | (40) |
- Mid Rhondda
- Pontypridd
- Dundee Hibernian
- Ayr United (trial)
- Clyde
| 1923–1924 | Port Vale | 12 | (2) |
| 1924 | New Brighton | 10 | (4) |
| 1924 | Wrexham | 1 | (0) |
- Welshpool Town
- Holyhead Town
- * Club domestic league appearances and goals

Frederick J. Howard (1893 – after 1924) was an English footballer. He played in Wales with Mid Rhondda, Pontypridd, Wrexham, and Welshpool Town; in Scotland with Dundee Hibernian, Ayr United, and Clyde; and in England with Manchester City, Port Vale, and New Brighton.

== Career ==
Howard was born in Walkden and played youth football with Walkden Wednesday before starting his professional career with Manchester City in 1912. He hit 12 goals in 16 First Division games in 1912–13, including all four in a 4–1 win over Liverpool at Hyde Road. He bagged 14 goals in 35 appearances in 1913–14, including a hat-trick against Derby County at the Baseball Ground. He scored 18 goals in 36 games in 1914–15 to become the club's top scorer. He scored a total of 40 goals in 79 league games. This total probably would have been much higher if it were not for World War I. He did remain in Manchester for part of the 1915–16 season, scoring four goals in seven games.

After leaving City in 1919, he played for Welsh sides Mid Rhondda and Pontypridd before heading to Scotland with Dundee Hibernian, Ayr United (on trial) and Clyde.

Howard returned to England in July 1923, signing with Second Division side Port Vale. He played 12 games in the 1923–24 season and scored two goals in a 4–3 defeat to Crystal Palace at the Old Recreation Ground on 1 September. His stay in Burslem was short though, and after losing his first-team place in November 1923 he was given a free transfer to New Brighton of the Third Division North. He later moved back to Wales to play for Wrexham, Welshpool Town and Holyhead Town.

== Career statistics ==
Appearances and goals by club, season and competition
| Club | Season | League | | | FA Cup | | Other | | Total | |
| Club | Season | Division | Apps | Goals | Apps | Goals | Apps | Goals | Apps | Goals |
|---|---|---|---|---|---|---|---|---|---|---|
| Manchester City | 1912–13 | First Division | 16 | 11 | 1 | 0 | 0 | 0 | 17 | 11 |
| Manchester City | 1913–14 | First Division | 29 | 11 | 6 | 3 | 0 | 0 | 35 | 14 |
| Manchester City | 1914–15 | First Division | 33 | 18 | 3 | 0 | 0 | 0 | 36 | 18 |
| Manchester City | 1919–20 | First Division | 1 | 0 | 1 | 0 | 0 | 0 | 2 | 0 |
| Manchester City | Total | | 79 | 40 | 11 | 3 | 0 | 0 | 90 | 43 |
| Port Vale | 1923–24 | Second Division | 12 | 2 | 0 | 0 | 0 | 0 | 12 | 2 |
| New Brighton | 1923–24 | Third Division North | 10 | 4 | 0 | 0 | 0 | 0 | 10 | 4 |
| Wrexham | 1924–25 | Third Division North | 1 | 0 | 0 | 0 | 0 | 0 | 1 | 0 |
