= 1912–13 Manchester City F.C. season =

English football club season

Manchester City F.C.
1912–13 season
- Manager: Committee (until 7 September 1912); Ernest Mangnall
- Football League First Division: 6th place
- FA Cup: Second round
- Top goalscorer: League: Wynn (14 goals); All: Wynn (16 goals)
- Highest home attendance: 41,709 vs Sunderland (1 February 1913)
- Lowest home attendance: 15,000 vs Chelsea (26 October 1912); 15,000 vs Woolwich Arsenal (8 March 1913); 15,000 vs Derby County (26 April 1913)

The 1912–13 season was Manchester City F.C.'s 22nd season of league football and 3rd consecutive season in the First Division of English football.

At the end of the previous season, manager Harry Newbould left the club following two poor bottom-half finishes. The club had no manager for the start of the season and so a committee of club officials guided the team for their first two matches. However, before their second game - a Manchester derby at Old Trafford - Ernest Mangnall had already been confirmed as taking over the managerial position at Hyde Road, and though he was still contracted to manage City's rivals for the game, when United lost by one goal to nil the press were eager to pick up on Mangnall's delight at the result. To date, Mangnall remains the only man to have ever managed at both Manchester clubs.

== Football League First Division ==
| Pos | Team | Pld | W | D | L | GF | GA | GAv | Pts |
|---|---|---|---|---|---|---|---|---|---|
| 4 | Manchester United | 38 | 19 | 8 | 11 | 69 | 43 | 1.605 | 46 |
| 5 | Blackburn Rovers | 38 | 16 | 13 | 9 | 79 | 43 | 1.837 | 45 |
| 6 | Manchester City | 38 | 18 | 8 | 12 | 53 | 37 | 1.432 | 44 |
| 7 | Derby County | 38 | 17 | 8 | 13 | 69 | 66 | 1.045 | 42 |
| 8 | Bolton Wanderers | 38 | 16 | 10 | 12 | 62 | 63 | 0.984 | 42 |

Source: World Football
Rules for classification: 1) Points; 2) Goal average; 3) Goals scored

=== Results summary ===
| Overall | | | | | | | | Home | | | | | | Away | | | | | |
| Pld | W | D | L | GF | GA | GAv | Pts | W | D | L | GF | GA | Pts | W | D | L | GF | GA | Pts |
|---|---|---|---|---|---|---|---|---|---|---|---|---|---|---|---|---|---|---|---|
| 38 | 18 | 8 | 12 | 53 | 37 | 1.432 | 44 | 12 | 3 | 4 | 34 | 15 | 27 | 6 | 5 | 8 | 19 | 22 | 17 |

Source: rsssf.com

=== Reports ===
| Date | Opponents | H / A | Venue | Result F – A | Scorers | Attendance |
|---|---|---|---|---|---|---|
| 2 September 1912 | Notts County | A | Meadow Lane | 1 – 0 | Henry | 12,000 |
| 7 September 1912 | Manchester United | A | Old Trafford | 1 – 0 | Wynn | 38,911 |
| 14 September 1912 | Aston Villa | H | Hyde Road | 1 – 0 | Wynn | 32,000 |
| 21 September 1912 | Liverpool | A | Anfield | 2 – 1 | Wynn, Dorsett | 35,237 |
| 28 September 1912 | Bolton Wanderers | H | Hyde Road | 2 – 0 | Hoad, Jones | 30,000 |
| 5 October 1912 | Sheffield United | A | Bramall Lane | 1 – 1 | Wallace | 25,000 |
| 12 October 1912 | Newcastle United | H | Hyde Road | 0 – 1 | | 40,000 |
| 19 October 1912 | Oldham Athletic | A | Boundary Park | 1 – 2 | Wynn | 10,000 |
| 26 October 1912 | Chelsea | H | Hyde Road | 2 – 0 | Taylor, Jones | 15,000 |
| 2 November 1912 | Woolwich Arsenal | A | Manor Ground | 4 – 0 | Wynn, Taylor (2), Jones | 8,000 |
| 9 November 1912 | Bradford City | H | Hyde Road | 1 – 3 | Wynn | 30,000 |
| 16 November 1912 | Sunderland | H | Hyde Road | 1 – 0 | Wynn | 16,000 |
| 23 November 1912 | West Bromwich Albion | A | The Hawthorns | 2 – 0 | Jones, Wallace | 20,000 |
| 30 November 1912 | Everton | H | Hyde Road | 1 – 0 | Wallace | 20,000 |
| 7 December 1912 | The Wednesday | A | Hillsborough | 0 – 1 | | 20,000 |
| 14 December 1912 | Blackburn Rovers | H | Hyde Road | 3 – 1 | Dorsett, Wynn, Jones | 20,000 |
| 21 December 1912 | Derby County | A | Baseball Ground | 0 – 2 | | 15,000 |
| 25 December 1912 | Tottenham Hotspur | H | Hyde Road | 2 – 2 | Bottomley, Wynn | 30,000 |
| 26 December 1912 | Tottenham Hotspur | A | White Hart Lane | 0 – 4 | | 12,000 |
| 28 December 1912 | Manchester United | H | Hyde Road | 0 – 2 | | 36,223 |
| 2 January 1913 | Notts County | H | Hyde Road | 4 – 0 | Wynn (2), Jones, Wallace | 22,000 |
| 4 January 1913 | Aston Villa | A | Villa Park | 0 – 2 | | 10,000 |
| 18 January 1913 | Liverpool | H | Hyde Road | 4 – 1 | Howard (4) | 20,000 |
| 25 January 1913 | Bolton Wanderers | A | Burnden Park | 2 – 2 | Wynn, Howard | 25,000 |
| 8 February 1913 | Sheffield United | H | Hyde Road | 3 – 0 | Howard, Jones, Wallace | 18,000 |
| 15 February 1913 | Newcastle United | A | St James' Park | 1 – 0 | Wynn | 30,000 |
| 1 March 1913 | Chelsea | A | Stamford Bridge | 1 – 2 | Dorsett | 40,000 |
| 8 March 1913 | Woolwich Arsenal | H | Hyde Road | 0 – 1 | | 15,000 |
| 12 March 1913 | Oldham Athletic | H | Hyde Road | 2 – 0 | Dorsett, Jones | 16,000 |
| 15 March 1913 | Bradford City | A | Valley Parade | 1 – 2 | Wallace | 6,000 |
| 21 March 1913 | Middlesbrough | A | Ayresome Park | 0 – 0 | | 15,000 |
| 22 March 1913 | Sunderland | A | Roker Park | 0 – 1 | | 20,000 |
| 24 March 1913 | Middlesbrough | H | Hyde Road | 3 – 0 | Howard (2), Taylor | 26,000 |
| 29 March 1913 | West Bromwich Albion | H | Hyde Road | 2 – 1 | Wallace (2) | 20,000 |
| 5 April 1913 | Everton | A | Goodison Park | 0 – 0 | | 12,000 |
| 12 April 1913 | The Wednesday | H | Hyde Road | 2 – 2 | Howard, Jones | 30,000 |
| 19 April 1913 | Blackburn Rovers | A | Ewood Park | 2 – 2 | Howard (2) | 8,000 |
| 26 April 1913 | Derby County | H | Hyde Road | 1 – 1 | Wynn | 15,000 |

== FA Cup ==
| Date | Round | Opponents | H / A | Venue | Result F – A | Scorers | Attendance |
|---|---|---|---|---|---|---|---|
| 11 January 1913 | First round | Birmingham | H | Hyde Road | 4 – 0 | Wynn (2), Hoad, Taylor | 17,442 |
| 1 February 1913 | Second round | Sunderland | H | Hyde Road | Abandoned in extra time due to crowd congestion 0 – 0 | | 41,709 |
| 5 February 1913 | Second round | Sunderland | A | Roker Park | 0 – 2 | | 27,974 |

== Squad statistics ==
=== Squad ===
Appearances for competitive matches only

| Pos. | Name | League | | FA Cup | | Abandoned | | Total | |
| Pos. | Name | Apps | Goals | Apps | Goals | Apps | Goals | Apps | Goals |
|---|---|---|---|---|---|---|---|---|---|
| GK | (England) Jim Goodchild | 28 | 0 | 0 | 0 | 0 | 0 | 28 | 0 |
| GK | (England) Walter Smith | 10 | 0 | 2 | 0 | 1 | 0 | 13 | 0 |
| DF | (England) Eli Fletcher | 33 | 0 | 2 | 0 | 1 | 0 | 36 | 0 |
| MF | (England) Joe Dorsett | 30 | 4 | 0 | 0 | 0 | 0 | 30 | 4 |
| MF | (England) Sid Hoad | 16 | 1 | 2 | 1 | 1 | 0 | 19 | 2 |
| MF | (England) Tom Holford | 38 | 0 | 2 | 0 | 1 | 0 | 41 | 0 |
| FW | (England) Fred Howard | 16 | 12 | 1 | 0 | 1 | 0 | 18 | 12 |
| FW | (Wales) Lot Jones | 37 | 9 | 2 | 0 | 1 | 0 | 40 | 9 |
| FW | (England) Harry Taylor | 22 | 4 | 1 | 1 | 0 | 0 | 23 | 5 |
| FW | (Wales) George Wynn | 31 | 14 | 2 | 2 | 1 | 0 | 34 | 16 |
| -- | Bill Bottomley | 33 | 1 | 1 | 0 | 0 | 0 | 34 | 1 |
| -- | (Scotland) Bill Eadie | 31 | 0 | 2 | 0 | 1 | 0 | 34 | 0 |
| -- | William Garner | 2 | 0 | 0 | 0 | 0 | 0 | 2 | 0 |
| -- | Billy Henry | 37 | 1 | 2 | 0 | 1 | 0 | 40 | 1 |
| -- | Edwin Hughes | 5 | 0 | 1 | 0 | 1 | 0 | 7 | 0 |
| -- | Len Jobling | 2 | 0 | 0 | 0 | 0 | 0 | 2 | 0 |
| -- | William Kelly | 3 | 0 | 0 | 0 | 0 | 0 | 3 | 0 |
| -- | Val Lawrence | 1 | 0 | 0 | 0 | 0 | 0 | 1 | 0 |
| -- | Peter McGuire | 6 | 0 | 0 | 0 | 0 | 0 | 6 | 0 |
| -- | Len Wall | 7 | 0 | 0 | 0 | 0 | 0 | 7 | 0 |
| -- | William Wallace | 28 | 8 | 2 | 0 | 1 | 0 | 31 | 8 |
| -- | Webb | 2 | 0 | 0 | 0 | 0 | 0 | 2 | 0 |

=== Scorers ===
==== All ====
| Scorer | Goals |
|---|---|
| (Wales) George Wynn | 16 |
| (England) Fred Howard | 12 |
| (Wales) Lot Jones | 9 |
| William Wallace | 8 |
| (England) Harry Taylor | 5 |
| (England) Joe Dorsett | 4 |
| (England) Sid Hoad | 2 |
| Bill Bottomley | 1 |
| Billy Henry | 1 |

==== League ====
| Scorer | Goals |
|---|---|
| (Wales) George Wynn | 14 |
| (England) Fred Howard | 12 |
| (Wales) Lot Jones | 9 |
| William Wallace | 8 |
| (England) Joe Dorsett | 4 |
| (England) Harry Taylor | 4 |
| Bill Bottomley | 1 |
| Billy Henry | 1 |
| (England) Sid Hoad | 1 |

==== FA Cup ====
| Scorer | Goals |
|---|---|
| (Wales) George Wynn | 2 |
| (England) Sid Hoad | 1 |
| (England) Harry Taylor | 1 |

== See also ==
- Manchester City F.C. seasons
