= Jack Brennan (footballer, born 1892) =

English footballer

Personal information
- Full name: John Brennan
- Date of birth: 13 December 1892
- Place of birth: Manchester, England
- Date of death: 13 August 1942 (aged 49)
- Height: 5 ft 9 in (1.75 m)
- Position: Half back

Youth career
- Ancoats Lads Club

Senior career*
Years	Team	Apps	(Gls)
- Hollinwood United
- Denton
1912–1913	Glossop	21	(0)
1913–1914	Bradford City	11	(0)
1914–1922	Manchester City	56	(0)
1922–1923	Rochdale	0	(0)
Total		88	(0)
- * Club domestic league appearances and goals

John Brennan (13 December 1892 – 13 August 1942) was an English professional footballer who played as a half back. He made 88 appearances in the Football League without scoring.

== Career ==
Born in Manchester, Brennan played for Ancoats Lads Club, Hollinwood United, Denton, Glossop, Bradford City, Manchester City and Rochdale. For Bradford City, he made 11 appearances in the Football League. For Manchester City, he made 56 appearances in the Football League, and 4 appearances in the FA Cup. Brennan was also part of Great Britain's squad for the 1920 Summer Olympics, but he did not play in any matches.

== Sources ==
- Frost, Terry (1988). Bradford City A Complete Record 1903–1988. Breedon Books Sport. ISBN 0-907969-38-0.
