= Samuel Eyres =

English footballer

Personal information
- Date of birth: 1885
- Place of birth: Droylsden, England
- Date of death: 31 October 1917 (aged 32)
- Place of death: Passchendaele, Belgium
- Position(s): Forward

Senior career*
| Years | Team | Apps | (Gls) |
- Colne
- Crewe Alexandra
- Failsworth
- Hyde
| 1907 | Manchester City | 1 | (0) |
- *Club domestic league appearances and goals

Samuel Eyres (1885 – 31 October 1917) was an English professional footballer who played as a forward in the Football League for Manchester City.

== Personal life ==
Eyres served as a gunner in the Royal Field Artillery during the First World War. He was killed during the Battle of Passchendaele on 31 October 1917 and is buried at Ypres Reservoir Cemetery.

== Career statistics ==
Appearances and goals by club, season and competition
| Club | Season | Division | League | | FA Cup | | Total | |
| Club | Season | Division | Apps | Goals | Apps | Goals | Apps | Goals |
|---|---|---|---|---|---|---|---|---|
| Manchester City | 1906–07 | First Division | 1 | 0 | 0 | 0 | 1 | 0 |
| Career total | | | 1 | 0 | 0 | 0 | 1 | 0 |
