= Joby Godfrey =

English footballer

Personal information
- Full name: Joseph Godfrey
- Date of birth: 8 January 1894
- Place of birth: Waleswood, England
- Date of death: January 1977 (aged 82–83)
- Place of death: Rotherham, England
- Position: Forward

Senior career*
Years	Team	Apps	(Gls)
- Kiveton Park
- Beighton Recreation
1916–1918	Nottingham Forest	0	(0)
1918–1919	Birmingham	3	(1)
1919	Coventry City	6	(0)
1919–1920	Manchester City	9	(1)
1920–1921	Merthyr Town	7	(2)
1921–1922	Rotherham Town		
1922–192?	Denaby United		
- Mexborough Town
1925–19??	Denaby United		
- * Club domestic league appearances and goals

Joseph Godfrey (January 1894 – January 1977), commonly known as Joby Godfrey, was an English professional footballer who played in the Football League for Birmingham, Coventry City, Manchester City and Merthyr Town. He played as a forward.

Godfrey was born in Waleswood, near Rotherham. He scored freely in wartime competition, but was unable to settle when the Football League began again. He scored on his debut for Birmingham in the Second Division on the opening day of the first post-war season, in a 4–1 home win against Hull City, but by the end of that season he had moved to Merthyr Town via both Coventry City and Manchester City. After a year with Merthyr, in which he rarely appeared for the first team, he moved into non-league football back in his native Yorkshire.
