= James Abbott (footballer) =

English footballer

Personal information
- Date of birth: 1892
- Place of birth: Patricroft, England
- Position: Inside right

Senior career*
Years	Team	Apps	(Gls)
	Barton Albion	~	
	Eccles Borough	~	
1913	Manchester City	3	(2)
- * Club domestic league appearances and goals

James Abbott (1892–unknown) was a footballer who played in the Football League for Manchester City. He was born in Patricroft, England.

He played in three top flight games for Manchester City, prior to the outbreak of World War One, scoring two goals in three games, including a goal on his debut at Sheffield United in September 1913. He had moved to the Hyde Road club after non-League spells with Barton Albion and Eccles Borough.
