= Fred Howard (Australian footballer) =

Australian rules footballer

Personal information
- Full name: Frederick William Howard
- Born: 30 January 1878
- Died: 23 July 1942 (aged 64)
- Height: 180 cm (5 ft 11 in)
- Position: Defender

Playing career^{1}
Years	Club	Games (Goals)
1902	Fitzroy	2 (0)
1905–06	Melbourne	24 (0)
Total		26 (0)
- ^{1} Playing statistics correct to the end of 1906.

Fred Howard (30 January 1878 – 23 July 1942) was an Australian rules footballer who played with Fitzroy and Melbourne in the Victorian Football League (VFL).
