= Lawrence Furniss =

English footballer (1862–1941)

Personal information
- Date of birth: 1862
- Date of death: 1941 (aged 78–79)

Managerial career
- Years: Team
- 1889–1893: Manchester City

Lawrence Furniss (1862–1941) was an English football player, manager and chairman who was the first ever manager of Manchester City.
