= George Lockhart (footballer) =

Scottish footballer

Personal information
- Full name: George Lockhart
- Date of birth: 1877
- Place of birth: Barrhill, Scotland
- Position: Left back

Senior career*
Years	Team	Apps	(Gls)
1897–1900	Bolton Wanderers	26	(0)
1900–1903	Burnley	93	(0)
- * Club domestic league appearances and goals

George Lockhart (1877 – unknown) was a Scottish professional footballer who played as a left full-back.
