= Frederic Howard =

English footballer

Personal information
- Full name: Frederic Julian Howard
- Date of birth: 1895
- Place of birth: Gotham, Nottinghamshire, England
- Date of death: 22 December 1933 (aged 38)
- Position: Inside forward

Youth career
- Stapleford Brookhill
- Long Eaton

Senior career*
Years	Team	Apps	(Gls)
1919–1920	Derby County	5	(0)
1920–1922	Gillingham	18	(3)
1922–????	Ayr United		
- Long Eaton
- * Club domestic league appearances and goals

Frederic Julian Howard (1895 – 22 December 1933) was an English professional footballer of the 1920s.

Born in Long Eaton, he joined Gillingham from Derby County in 1920 and went on to make 18 appearances for the club in The Football League, scoring three goals. He left to join Ayr United in 1922.
