= Joe Dorsett =

English footballer (1888–1951)

Personal information
- Full name: Joseph Arthur Harold Dorsett
- Date of birth: 11 April 1888
- Place of birth: Brownhills, England
- Date of death: 15 March 1951 (aged 62)
- Place of death: Eccles, England
- Positions: Outside forward; centre forward

Senior career*
Years	Team	Apps	(Gls)
–1904	Brownhills Albion		
1904–1910	West Bromwich Albion	18	(3)
1910–1920	Manchester City	132	(17)
1920	Colne		
1920–1921	Southend United	34	(3)
1921–1923	Millwall	55	(0)
- * Club domestic league appearances and goals

Joseph Arthur Harold Dorsett (11 April 1888 – 15 March 1951) was an English professional footballer who made over 130 appearances in the Football League for Manchester City as a forward. He also played league football for Millwall, Southend United and West Bromwich Albion.

== Personal life ==
Dorsett was the brother of George Dorsett and the uncle of Dicky Dorsett and Ted Sagar. He served as a driver in the Royal Engineers during the First World War.

== Career statistics ==
Appearances and goals by club, season and competition
Club	Season	League			FA Cup		Total	
Club	Season	Division	Apps	Goals	Apps	Goals	Apps	Goals
West Bromwich Albion	1908–09	Second Division	5	1	0	0	5	1
West Bromwich Albion	1909–10	Second Division	13	2	0	0	13	2
West Bromwich Albion	Total		18	3	0	0	18	3
Manchester City	1910–11	First Division	26	3	1	0	27	3
Manchester City	1911–12	First Division	33	7	2	0	35	7
Manchester City	1912–13	First Division	30	4	0	0	30	4
Manchester City	1913–14	First Division	17	1	0	0	17	1
Manchester City	1914–15	First Division	18	2	3	0	21	2
Manchester City	1919–20	First Division	8	0	0	0	8	0
Manchester City	Total		132	17	6	0	138	17
Southend United	1920–21	Third Division South	34	3	3	2	37	5
Millwall	1921–22	Third Division South	35	0	4	1	39	1
Millwall	1922–23	Third Division South	20	0	2	0	22	0
Millwall	Total		55	0	6	1	61	1
Career total			239	23	15	3	254	26
