= Ted Hanney =

English footballer and manager

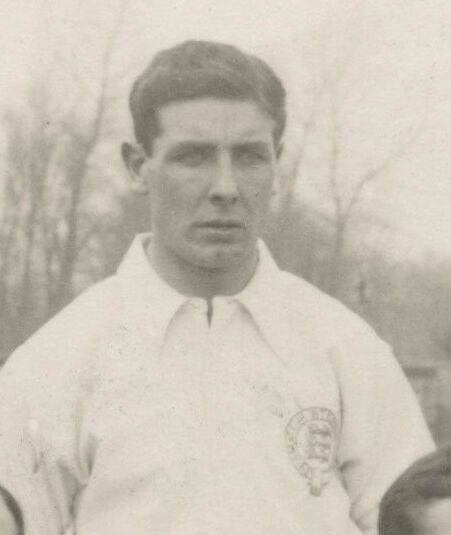
- Hanney while a guest at Brentford in 1919.

Personal information
- Full name: Terence Percival Hanney
- Date of birth: 19 January 1889
- Place of birth: Bradfield, England
- Date of death: 30 November 1964 (aged 75)
- Place of death: Reading, England
- Position: Centre half

Senior career*
Years	Team	Apps	(Gls)
- Wokingham Town
–1913	Reading		
1913–1919	Manchester City	68	(1)
1917–1919	→ Brentford (guest)	34	(1)
- → Clapton Orient (guest)
1919–1921	Coventry City	32	(0)
1921–1922	Reading	41	(2)
- Northfleet

International career
1912	Great Britain	1	(0)

Managerial career
- 1924–1927: VfB Stuttgart
- 1927–1928: FC Wacker Munich
Medal record
Men's football
Representing Great Britain
Olympic Games
Gold medal – first place	1912 Stockholm	Team competition
- * Club domestic league appearances and goals

Terence Percival Hanney (19 January 1889 – 30 November 1964) was an English football player and manager.

Hanney was part of the gold medal-winning Great Britain team in the 1912 Olympic football competition in Stockholm. Due to an injury he suffered in the quarter-final match (which Britain won 7–0 against Hungary), Hanney he missed the 4–2 victory over Denmark in the final.

He commenced his career with Wokingham Town before moving to Reading. In 1913, he turned professional and switched for a fee of £1,250 to Manchester City, for whom he played 78 matches. Hanney guested for Brentford in the London Combination during the First World War. Having served in the Royal Berkshires before the war, Hanney held the rank of sergeant in the Football Battalion and was wounded in the face and neck by shrapnel at Delville Wood in July 1916. Later he played two seasons for Coventry City. After this he returned to Reading, where he finished his Football League career in the Third Division and then moved back into non-league football with Northfleet.

From 1924 later, he coached VfB Stuttgart, winning the regional championship of Württemberg-Baden in 1927, the first title for the club. In 1927-28 he coached FC Wacker München, taking the club to the semi-finals of the German Championship.

After returning to England he became a publican.

== Career statistics ==
Appearances and goals by club, season and competition
Club	Season	League			FA Cup		Total	
Club	Season	Division	Apps	Goals	Apps	Goals	Apps	Goals
Manchester City	1913–14	First Division	24	1	6	0	30	1
Manchester City	1914–15	First Division	37	0	4	0	41	0
Manchester City	1919–20	First Division	7	0	—		7	0
Manchester City	Total		68	1	9	0	77	1
Coventry City	1919–20	Second Division	20	0	2	0	22	0
Coventry City	1920–21	Second Division	12	0	2	1	14	1
Coventry City	Total		32	0	4	1	36	1
Reading	1921–22	Third Division South	41	2	0	0	41	2
Total			141	3	14	1	155	4

== Honours ==
Brentford

- London Combination: 1918–19
