= Edwin Hughes (footballer) =

Welsh footballer

Personal information
- Full name: Edwin Hughes
- Date of birth: 30 November 1885
- Place of birth: Wrexham, Wales
- Date of death: 17 April 1949 (aged 63)
- Place of death: Montgomery, Wales
- Position: Defender

Senior career*
Years	Team	Apps	(Gls)
1900	Wrexham St Giles		
–1905	Wrexham Victoria		
1905–1907	Wrexham		
1907–1911	Nottingham Forest	176	
1911–1913	Wrexham		
1913–1914	Manchester City	33	(5)
1918–	Aberdare Athletic		
- Colwyn Bay
–1925	Llandudno		

International career
1906–1914	Wales	16	(0)
- * Club domestic league appearances and goals

Edwin Hughes (1885–1949) was a Welsh international footballer who also played for Wrexham, Nottingham Forest and Manchester City.
