= Jimmy Hindmarsh =

English footballer and manager

Personal information
- Full name: James Lyons Hindmarsh
- Date of birth: 19 April 1885
- Place of birth: Whitburn, England
- Date of death: 16 March 1959 (aged 73)
- Place of death: Luton, England
- Positions: Half back; inside forward

Senior career*
| Years | Team | Apps | (Gls) |
| | Whitburn Colliery | ? | (?) |
| 1905–1906 | Sunderland | 1 | (0) |
| 1906–1907 | Fulham | 1 | (0) |
| 1907–1908 | Watford | ? | (?) |
| 1908–1910 | Plymouth Argyle | 57 | (22) |
| 1910–1912 | Stockport County | 69 | (2) |
| 1912–1914 | Manchester City | 28 | (1) |
| 1919–1920 | Newport County | 9 | (0) |

Managerial career
- 1922–1935: Newport County
- * Club domestic league appearances and goals

James Lyons Hindmarsh (1885 – 16 March 1959) was an English football player and manager. A half back and inside forward, he played in the Football League for Sunderland, Stockport County and Manchester City. Hindmarsh also played in the Southern League for Fulham, Watford, Plymouth Argyle and Newport County. He went on to manage Newport County for 13 years.
