= Jock Henderson (footballer, born 1895) =

Scottish footballer

John Henderson (1895 – 1957) was a Scottish professional footballer. He played for Manchester City, Southend United, Gillingham and Dunfermline Athletic shortly after the First World War. He was born and died in Kelty.
