= Peter Gartland =

English footballer

Personal information
- Full name: Peter Gartland
- Date of birth: 14 May 1893
- Place of birth: Seaham, England
- Date of death: June 1973 (aged 80)
- Place of death: Manchester, England
- Position: Left back

Senior career*
Years	Team	Apps	(Gls)
–1914	Seaham Harbour		
1914–1918	Manchester City	1	(0)
- * Club domestic league appearances and goals

Peter Gartland (14 May 1893 – June 1973) was an English professional footballer who made one appearance as a left back in the Football League for Manchester City. At the time of his death in June 1973, Gartland was the last living member of Manchester City's final pre-war squad.

== Personal life ==
Gartland served as a gunner in the Royal Field Artillery during the First World War. In September 1918, he received a small shrapnel wound in the leg from a gas shell, which necessitated the leg being amputated.

== Career statistics ==
Appearances and goals by club, season and competition
Club	Season	League			FA Cup		Total	
Club	Season	Division	Apps	Goals	Apps	Goals	Apps	Goals
Manchester City	1914–15	First Division	1	0	0	0	1	0
Career total			1	0	0	0	1	0
