= Eli Fletcher =

English footballer

Personal information
- Date of birth: 15 December 1887
- Place of birth: Tunstall, Staffordshire, England
- Date of death: 6 August 1954 (aged 66)
- Place of death: Longsight, England
- Height: 5 ft 9 in (1.75 m)
- Position: Left-back

Youth career
- 1907–1908: Goldenhill Wanderers
- 1908–1909: Hanley Swifts

Senior career*
Years	Team	Apps	(Gls)
1909–1911	Crewe Alexandra		
1911–1926	Manchester City	301	(2)
1926–1927	Watford	23	(0)
1927–1928	Sandbach Ramblers		
1928–19??	Ards		
- * Club domestic league appearances and goals

Eli Fletcher (15 December 1887 – 6 August 1954) was an English footballer who played as a left-back for Crewe Alexandra, Manchester City, Watford, Sandbach Ramblers, and Ards.

== Career ==
Fletcher played for Crewe Alexandra and Manchester City. During World War I, he appeared for Port Vale as a guest in a 5–2 win over Manchester United in a Lancashire Regional section Subsidiary Tournament match on 28 April 1917; he also played for the club as a guest in April 1919. He later played for Watford, Sandbach Ramblers, and Ards. He later became a coach at Manchester City.

== Career statistics ==
Appearances and goals by club, season and competition
Club	Season	League			FA Cup		Total	
Club	Season	Division	Apps	Goals	Apps	Goals	Apps	Goals
Manchester City	1911–12	First Division	35	1	2	0	37	1
Manchester City	1912–13	First Division	33	0	2	0	35	0
Manchester City	1913–14	First Division	36	0	6	0	42	0
Manchester City	1914–15	First Division	37	0	4	0	41	0
Manchester City	1919–20	First Division	34	1	2	0	36	1
Manchester City	1920–21	First Division	35	0	1	0	36	0
Manchester City	1921–22	First Division	38	0	3	0	41	0
Manchester City	1922–23	First Division	5	0	0	0	5	0
Manchester City	1923–24	First Division	20	0	4	0	24	0
Manchester City	1924–25	First Division	27	0	1	0	28	0
Manchester City	1925–26	First Division	1	0	0	0	1	0
Manchester City	Total		301	2	25	0	326	2
Watford	1926–27	Third Division South	23	0	2	1	25	1
Career total			324	2	27	1	351	3
