= Harry Taylor (footballer, born 1892) =

English footballer

Personal information
- Full name: Henry George Taylor
- Date of birth: 1892
- Place of birth: Fegg Hayes, England
- Date of death: 1960 (aged 67–68)
- Position: Inside right

Youth career
- Chell Heath
- Fegg Hayes

Senior career*
Years	Team	Apps	(Gls)
	Newcastle United	0	(0)
- Fulham
1909–1910	Stoke	10	(4)
1911–1912	Huddersfield Town	15	(5)
1912	Port Vale	0	(0)
1912–1921	Manchester City	91	(27)
Total		116+	(36+)
- * Club domestic league appearances and goals

Henry George Taylor (1892–1960) was an English footballer.

== Career ==
Taylor played for local Staffordshire teams Chell Heath and Fegg Hayes. He then had spells with Newcastle United and Fulham before joining Stoke. He signed with Huddersfield Town in 1911, scoring five goals and playing 15 league games. He joined Port Vale for £30 in May 1912, but was reported to have been sold to Manchester City for £300 the following month without having taken to the field for the "Valiants".

== Career statistics ==
Appearances and goals by club, season and competition
Club	Season	League			FA Cup		Total	
Club	Season	Division	Apps	Goals	Apps	Goals	Apps	Goals
Stoke	1909–10	Birmingham & District League; Southern League Division Two	10	4	0	0	10	4
Huddersfield Town	1911–12	Second Division	15	5	1	0	16	5
Port Vale	1912–13	Central League	0	0	0	0	0	0
Manchester City	1912–13	First Division	22	4	1	1	23	5
Manchester City	1913–14	First Division	27	8	6	0	33	8
Manchester City	1914–15	First Division	35	11	3	0	38	11
Manchester City	1919–20	First Division	6	4	0	0	6	4
Manchester City	1920–21	First Division	1	0	0	0	1	0
Manchester City	Total		91	27	10	1	101	28
Career total			116	36	11	1	127	37
