= George Wynn =

Welsh footballer

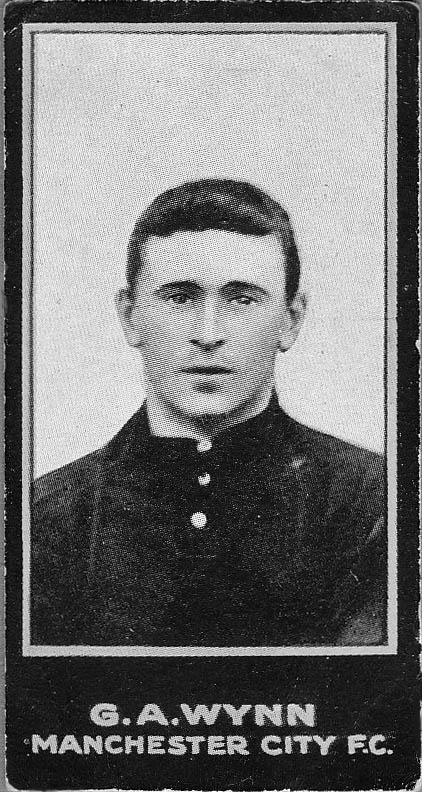

Personal information
- Full name: George Arthur Wynn
- Date of birth: 14 October 1886
- Place of birth: Treflach, England
- Date of death: 28 October 1966 (aged 80)
- Place of death: Abergele, Wales
- Position: Inside right

Senior career*
Years	Team	Apps	(Gls)
- Pant Glas
- Chirk
- Oswestry United
- Shrewsbury Town
1908–1909	Wrexham	41	(28)
1909–1919	Manchester City	119	(54)
1919–1920	Coventry City	24	(4)
- Llandudno Town
1921–1922	Halifax Town	1	(0)
1922–1923	Mansfield Town		
	Mossley	61	(25)

International career
1909–1914	Wales	11	(1)
1919	Wales (wartime)	1	(1)
- * Club domestic league appearances and goals

George Arthur Wynn (14 October 1886 – 28 October 1966) was a Welsh professional footballer who played as a forward or as a half back for Oswestry United, Wrexham, Manchester City, Coventry City and Halifax Town. He also won 12 caps for Wales. He had a record of being an accomplished finisher in and around the box, his seasons' tallies laying claim to that.

== Career ==
Wynn made his footballing debut for Oswestry United in 1906 and scored in the final as the club lifted the Welsh Cup in 1906.

Within weeks of the Welsh Cup final, Wynn had been snapped up by Wrexham, who were playing in the Football Combination at the time. Whilst at Wrexham, Wynn made his international debut on 1 March 1909 in a Home Championship match against Scotland at The Racecourse, Wrexham, which Wales won 3–2. He scored his only international goal in a 3–2 victory over Ireland, also at The Racecourse. Several league clubs were believed to be interested in signing Wynn, and in May 1909, he moved to Manchester City for £250.

Wynn made his Manchester City debut on Christmas Day 1909 in a 2–0 defeat to Bradford Park Avenue. He scored his first goal for the club two days later against Grimsby Town. In the 1909–10 season he scored 12 goals in 24 appearances as Manchester City won the Second Division championship. In each of the next three seasons he was the club's leading goalscorer with 9, 18 and 16 goals respectively. The onset of World War I shortened Wynn's playing career. His final game for Manchester City came shortly after the resumption of competitive football, in a match against Oldham Athletic on 8 September 1919. In total he made 127 appearances for the club, scoring 60 goals.

Having appeared for Wales in both Victory internationals – unofficial international matches between Wales and England to mark the end of World War I – Wynn was sold to Coventry City for £300. At Coventry he made a total of 27 appearances in two seasons. He made a solitary appearance for Halifax Town before bringing his career to an end with Cheshire League side Mossley.

Internationally he was capped a total of 12 times by Wales and was a prominent figure for the national team during the pre-Great War period. He was one of the key members of the XI alongside former Manchester City team-mate and legend Billy Meredith.

== Personal life ==
Wynn served as a private in the Lancashire Fusiliers and the Lincolnshire Regiment during the First World War. In 1918, he was shot in the left leg and received wounds from a shell burst.

== Career statistics ==
Appearances and goals by club, season and competition
Club	Season	League			FA Cup		Total	
Club	Season	Division	Apps	Goals	Apps	Goals	Apps	Goals
Manchester City	1909–10	Second Division	20	10	4	2	24	12
Manchester City	1910–11	First Division	20	9	0	0	20	9
Manchester City	1911–12	First Division	31	17	2	1	33	18
Manchester City	1912–13	First Division	31	14	2	2	33	16
Manchester City	1913–14	First Division	12	3	0	0	12	3
Manchester City	1914–15	First Division	1	0	0	0	1	0
Manchester City	1919–20	First Division	4	1	—		4	1
Manchester City	Total		119	54	8	5	127	59
Coventry City	1919–20	Second Division	17	2	2	0	19	2
Coventry City	1920–21	Second Division	7	1	0	0	7	1
Coventry City	Total		25	3	2	0	27	3
Halifax Town	1921–22	Third Division North	1	0	0	0	1	0
Career total			145	57	10	5	155	62
