= Tommy Browell =

English footballer (1892–1955)

Personal information
- Full name: Thomas Browell
- Date of birth: 19 October 1892
- Place of birth: Walbottle, Newcastle upon Tyne, England
- Date of death: 5 October 1955 (aged 62)
- Height: 5 ft 8 in (1.73 m)
- Position: Striker

Senior career*
| Years | Team | Apps | (Gls) |
| 1910–1911 | Hull City | 48 | (32) |
| 1911–1913 | Everton | 50 | (26) |
| 1913–1926 | Manchester City | 222 | (122) |
| 1926–1930 | Blackpool | 67 | (27) |
| Total | | 387 | (207) |
- * Club domestic league appearances and goals

Thomas Browell (19 October 1892 – 5 October 1955) was an English footballer who played as a forward for Hull City, Everton, Manchester City and Blackpool. He is the eighth-highest Manchester City goalscorer of all time with 139 goals for the club.

== Early life ==
Browell was born in Walbottle, Northumberland, in 1892.

== Career ==
He started his career with Hull City, who were then in the Football League Second Division, who also had Browell's two brothers on their books. At Hull he gained the nickname "Boy" following a hat-trick against Stockport County as an 18-year-old in 1910. A newspaper report of the match carried the headline "£10 men and a boy beat Stockport", and the nickname then followed throughout his career. A year later, after making 48 appearances and scoring 32 goals, he was signed by Everton, of the First Division, for a fee of £1,650. Despite only playing half the season for the club, Browell finished as Everton's top goalscorer in the 1911–12 season. In two years at Everton he scored 36 goals in 60 appearances, including two FA Cup hat-tricks.

In October 1913, Manchester City signed Browell for £1,780. He scored on his City debut against The Wednesday, though City lost the match 2–1. Two seasons into his time in Manchester, the outbreak of World War I suspended football for a four-year period. When matches resumed in 1919, Browell formed a prolific goalscoring partnership with Horace Barnes. In the 1920–21 season Manchester City finished runners-up in the league, and Browell set a career-best of 31 league goals.

In the 1925–26 season, Manchester City enjoyed a run to the FA Cup final in which Browell was an influential figure, scoring seven times, including a hat-trick in the 11–4 defeat of Crystal Palace, and two goals in the first half-hour of the semi-final against Manchester United. However, victory eluded the team in the final, which was won 1–0 by Bolton. To compound the misfortune, City were also relegated to the Second Division on the final day of the season, losing to Newcastle United despite a Browell goal. Relegation resulted in changes of personnel, and the following season Browell was transferred for £1,100 to Blackpool, where he played for four years. In total, he made 247 appearances for Manchester City, scoring 139 goals.

At Blackpool, under the guidance of Major Frank Buckley, Browell scored 14 goals in his first season to become the club's second-highest scorer. Those goals included a hat-trick in a 5–0 home win over Notts County on 7 May 1927, in the final game of the season.

For the 1927–28 season, Browell switched to the right side and teamed up with new arrival, the would-be prolific Jimmy Hampson. Browell scored another hat-trick that season, on 24 September 1927, in a 6–2 win against Bristol City at Bloomfield Road.

Eventually, age got the better of Browell, and with the emergence of Jack Oxberry, Browell was released at the age of 38. He remained in the Blackpool area, joining Lytham as player-coach. He also went on to coach Morecambe.

== Retirement ==
Upon retiring from football, Browell became a tram driver in Blackpool.

== Legacy ==
After his death in 1955, at the age of 62, Browell received the honour of having a street named after him in Manchester. Tommy Browell Close is located to the west of Manchester City's old home, Maine Road, and is part of an estate built in the 1970s.

== Honours ==
Manchester City

- FA Cup runner-up: 1925–26

Blackpool

- Football League Second Division: 1929–30
