= Horace Barnes =

English footballer (1891–1961)

Personal information
- Full name: Horace Barnes
- Date of birth: 3 January 1891
- Place of birth: Sheffield, England
- Date of death: 12 September 1961 (aged 70)
- Place of death: Clayton, England
- Height: 5 ft 9 in (1.75 m)
- Position: Inside left

Youth career
- Wadsley Bridge

Senior career*
Years	Team	Apps	(Gls)
1908–1914	Derby County	153	(74)
1914–1924	Manchester City	218	(120)
1924–1925	Preston North End	39	(16)
1925–1926	Oldham Athletic	41	(16)
1927–1931	Ashton National	166	(240)

International career
1921–1922	Football League XI	2	(0)
- * Club domestic league appearances and goals

Horace Barnes (3 January 1891 – 12 September 1961) was an English footballer, who played for Derby County, Manchester City, Preston North End and Oldham Athletic.

== Early life ==
Horace Barnes was born in Sheffield in 1891. He began his football career playing as an inside left for Wadsley Bridge. During the First World War, he worked in munitions and served in the Royal Garrison Artillery.

== Derby County ==
In 1908 Jimmy Methven signed Horace for Derby County. Barnes made 166 appearances for Derby and scored 76 goals. He scored both goals for an English XI in a 2–0 victory over their Scottish counterparts in a Players' Union international on 20 April 1914.

== Manchester City ==
In 1914 Manchester City purchased Barnes for £2,500.00. In his first season with the Manchester team he made 25 league appearances and scored 12 goals, helping the team to fifth in the first division, three points behind champions Everton. Barnes' first goal for City came in a 4–1 victory against Bradford City on the opening day of the season. Barnes' career was interrupted by the first world war which he spent working in a munition factory. He was able to resume his footballing career in the 1919–20 football season in which he was City's top scorer with 23 goals. City finished seventh in the league that season. In the 1920–21 football season he was City's second top scorer having scored 17 goals in 41 league appearances. Tommy Browell was the team's highest scorer with 31 goals. Manchester City came second in the league that season, 5 points behind champions Burnley. This was City's highest position in the league since the 1903–04 football season when City had a team which included Billie Gillespie, Frank Booth and Billy Meredith. In the following season, the 1921–22 football season, Billy Meredith returned to Manchester City to play in a forward line which included Barnes, Tommy Browell and Tommy Johnson. Barnes scored 20 league goals that season, one goal less than City's top scorer Tommy Browell. The team finished 10th in the league and he also made two appearances for the Football League XI during the season.

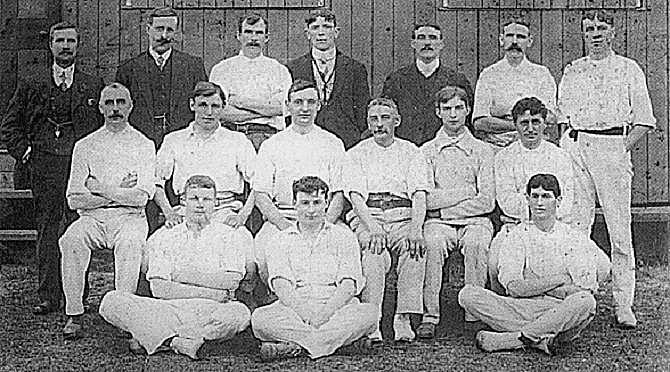
Barnes is shown here playing cricket for Ley's team in 1912. Second from left on middle row.

In the 1922–23 football season the City team was further enhanced by the acquisition of Frank Roberts from Bolton Wanderers. Barnes was City's top scorer in that season and the team finished eighth in the league. Three of Barnes' goals came in a 5–1 victory against Cardiff City. In the 1923–24 football season Manchester City moved to a new ground, Maine Road, and Horace Barnes scored the first goal at the new stadium in a 2–1 victory against Sheffield United on the opening day of the season. Tommy Johnson scored the other goal for City. The team ultimately finished eleventh in the league on 42 points and Barnes was the team's top scorer with 20 goals. Barnes played in 7 of City's 8 games in the FA Cup that season. The team were ultimately defeated in the semi-final by Newcastle United 2–0.

The 1924–25 football season was to be Barnes' last with Manchester City. He played 14 teams that season and scored 8 goals. Frank Roberts was the team's top scorer that season with 31 goals and the team finished tenth in the first division. Barnes' last goal for City was in a 1–1 draw with Huddersfield Town. He had appeared for City 218 times and scored 120 goals.

== Preston North End ==
Barnes joined Preston North End in November 1924 and scored on his debut for the club against Nottingham Forest. In his first season at the club he was joint top scorer. However the team finished in 21st place in the league and were relegated to the Second Division. He began the 1925–26 season with Preston but then transferred to Oldham Athletic.

== Oldham Athletic ==
Barnes ended his career at Oldham Athletic where he scored 20 goals in 46 games. He finished his career with a spell in non-league football with Ashton National.

== Later life ==
Barnes lived in Manchester for the rest of his life and worked as a packer. He died at his home in Clayton in 1961.

== Legacy ==
Barnes is regarded as one of Manchester City's greatest ever players. In 1977 the Manchester City Council named eleven streets in a new estate in Moss Side after famous City players including Barnes, Frank Swift, Fred Tilson, Sam Cowan, Sam Cookson, Max Woosnam, Tommy Browell, Jimmy McMullan, Eric Brook, Billy Meredith and Tommy Johnson. He is listed as the thirteenth greatest ever City player in Ian Penney's book The Essential History of Manchester City and twentieth on the Times website.

== Honours ==
Derby County

- Football League Second Division: 1911–12
