= Ernest Mangnall =

English football manager (1866–1932)

J. Ernest Mangnall
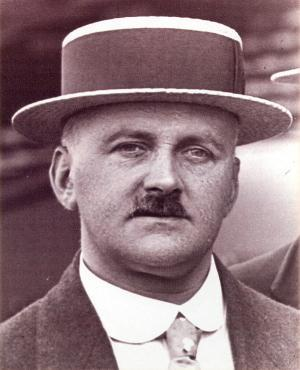

Personal information
- Full name: James Ernest Mangnall
- Date of birth: 30 May 1864
- Place of birth: Bolton, England
- Date of death: 13 January 1932 (aged 67)
- Place of death: Lytham St Annes, England

Managerial career
- Years: Team
- 1900–1903: Burnley
- 1903–1912: Manchester United
- 1912–1924: Manchester City

James Ernest Mangnall (30 May 1864 – 13 January 1932) was an English football manager who started his career with Burnley and managed Manchester United between 1903–1912 and then went on to manage Manchester City from 1912 to 1924, and is the only man to have managed both clubs.

== Managerial career ==
=== Burnley ===
Born in Bolton, Lancashire, Mangnall played amateur football as a goalkeeper and was a director at Bolton Wanderers. He started his career in football management with Burnley in March 1900, when he was hired as the club's second official manager following the departure of Harry Bradshaw almost a year earlier. The side were struggling when he joined the club, and with just one month of the 1899–1900 season remaining, relegation to the Second Division seemed almost inevitable. Their relegation was confirmed on 28 April 1900 after a 4–0 defeat away at Nottingham Forest. He signed three players, Henry Collins, Jimmy Lindsay and George Lockhart, in the close season. The team achieved a third-placed finish in their first season in the Second Division and finished ninth the following year. The team's fortunes suffered a swift decline in the 1902–03 season, and Burnley finished bottom of the Football League and were forced to apply for re-election. Burnley were re-elected and Mangnall started the next campaign as manager, but he left the club in October 1903 to join Second Division rivals Manchester United.

=== Manchester United ===
Mangnall was hired as the third secretary of Manchester United and the second after the club changed its name from Newton Heath (the term 'manager' was not used at United until the arrival of Jack Robson). He led the club to their first major trophy and first league title by winning the First Division title in 1908. With two First Division titles, one FA Cup and two Charity Shield trophies, he remains the third most successful manager at the club. He started his management at Manchester United in 1903 and saw his team narrowly miss promotion in his first two seasons before success at the third attempt, as the club finished as runners-up in the Second Division. In the first season in the First Division the club finished in mid-table. However, in only their second season in the First Division, he managed United to their first ever League Championship in 1907–08 by a nine-point margin over Aston Villa. The following year saw United drop below mid-table but the club won its first FA Cup with a 1–0 victory in the final against Bristol City, the winner scored by Sandy Turnbull. The following season saw no new silverware but the team improved its league position to fifth. In the 1910-11 season the club were champions again, beating Aston Villa into second place by just one point; it would be club's last league championship for over 40 years – its longest ever run without a league title. The next season was his last in charge at the club; he would eventually leave for a similar position at Manchester City.

=== Manchester City ===
Mangnall moved to Manchester City directly from United. His last game in charge of the Reds was the Manchester derby of September 1912 against City when it was already known he would become City manager. The Blues won 1–0 at Old Trafford and the media focused on Mangnall's delight.

He managed City from 1912 until 1924, the interruption of World War I would mean his spell there only covered eight Football League seasons however the Club did find success in wartime regional tournaments. His best season with the club was 1920–21, when City would finish runners up in the First Division, the top level of English football at the time.

Mangnall's place in Mancunian football is significant as many believe he was the instigator behind United's move to Old Trafford and City's move to Maine Road.

== Honours ==
=== Manager ===
Manchester United

- First Division (2): 1907–08, 1910–11
- FA Cup (1): 1908–09
- FA Charity Shield (2): 1908, 1911

== Managerial statistics ==
Team	Nat	From	To	Record				
Team	Nat	From	To	G	W	L	D	Win %
Burnley	(England)	March 1900	September 1903	133	47	27	59	35.34
Manchester United	(England)	September 1903	September 1912	471	242	139	90	51.38
Manchester City	(England)	September 1912	May 1924	350	151	117	82	43.14
Total				978	450	328	204	46.01

== See also ==
- List of English football championship winning managers
