= Jim Goodchild =

English footballer

Personal information
- Full name: Andrew James Goodchild
- Date of birth: 4 April 1892
- Place of birth: Southampton, England
- Date of death: 2 October 1950 (aged 58)
- Place of death: Eastleigh, England
- Height: 5 ft 10 in (1.78 m)
- Position: Goalkeeper

Youth career
- St Pauls Athletic

Senior career*
Years	Team	Apps	(Gls)
1909–1911	Southampton	5	(0)
1911–1927	Manchester City	204	(0)
1927–1929	Guildford City		
- * Club domestic league appearances and goals

Andrew James Goodchild (4 April 1892 – 2 October 1950) was an English football goalkeeper who played for Manchester City and was their goalkeeper in the 1926 FA Cup Final.

== Playing career ==
Born in Southampton, he signed for Southampton in September 1909 after two trial matches. At the Dell he was understudy to first choice 'keeper Tom Burrows. He made his first team debut in the final match of the 1909–10 season at home to Reading. In the following season Burrows lost his place to Arthur Brown who had returned to the "Saints" after three years with Portsmouth and Goodchild dropped down to third choice goalkeeper. He made only four appearances in the 1910–11 season and was released at the end of the season as "surplus to requirements".

He then obtained employment in Southampton Docks before Manchester City were alerted to his availability by Jimmy Yates, who was now Southampton's scout. Goodchild became a regular in City's first team over the next sixteen years appearing over 200 times between 1911 and 1927, including appearing on the losing side in the 1926 FA Cup Final against Bolton Wanderers. He also made over 100 appearances in War League matches during World War I; his total appearances for City in all first team matches was 347.

In August 1927 he returned to Southampton and became the licensee of the Royal Albert Hotel, turning out for two seasons on a part-time basis for Guildford City. He move to Eastleigh in 1941 to run the Cricketers Arms where he remained until his death in October 1950, aged 58.

== Honours ==
Manchester City

- FA Cup runner-up: 1925–26
