= Hyde Road (stadium) =

Sports venue in Manchester, England

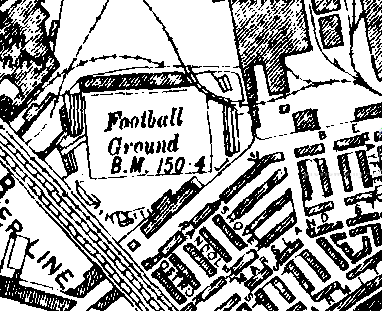
- Interactive map of Hyde Road
- Full name: Hyde Road
- Location: Ardwick, Manchester, England
- Coordinates: 53°28′10″N 2°12′32″W
- Owner: Manchester City F.C., Chesters Brewery
- Capacity: 40,000
- Field size: unknown

Construction
- Built: 1887
- Opened: 17 September 1887
- Closed: 1923
- Demolished: 1923

Tenant
- Manchester City F.C. (1887–1923)

Hyde Road was a football stadium in West Gorton, Manchester, England. It was home to Manchester City F.C. and their predecessors from its construction in 1887 until 1923, when the club moved to Maine Road. It was named after Hyde Road, a road which begins at the east end of Ardwick Green South in Ardwick and runs east towards Hyde. At the boundary between Gorton and Denton it continues as Manchester Road.

Before its use as a football ground, the site was an area of waste ground, and in its early days the ground had only rudimentary facilities. The first stand was built in 1888, but the ground had no changing facilities until 1896; players had to change in a nearby public house, the Hyde Road Hotel. By 1904 the ground had developed into a 40,000-capacity venue, hosting an FA Cup semi-final between Newcastle United and The Wednesday the following year.

The stands and terraces were arranged in a haphazard manner due to space constraints, and by 1920 the club had outgrown the cramped venue. A decision to seek an alternative venue was hastened in November 1920, when the Main Stand was destroyed by fire. Manchester City moved to the 80,000-capacity Maine Road in 1923, and Hyde Road was demolished shortly afterward. One structure from the ground is still in use in the 21st century, a section of roofing which was sold for use at The Shay, a stadium in Halifax.

== History ==
From the club's inception in 1880, Manchester City – first known as St Mark's (West Gorton), then as West Gorton A.F.C. and by mid-1884 as just Gorton A.F.C. – had struggled to find a stable location to base themselves. Originally simply playing on a dangerously bumpy patch of grass near to the church of their origin, the club quickly signed an agreement to ground-share with the Kirkmanshulme Cricket Club before being turfed out only a year later. Three further pitches were then created on wasteland over the following four seasons, but all proved inadequate for one reason or another. When their fifth pitch arrangement collapsed in 1887, with the landlord of the Bulls Head Hotel demanding a rent increase for the use of a nearby field, the club were forced to seek an alternative venue.

Then-captain Kenneth Mackenzie discovered an area of waste ground on Hyde Road in Ardwick when walking home from his place of work and informed the club committee. Lawrence Furniss, the club secretary, ascertained that the ground was owned by the Manchester, Sheffield and Lincolnshire Railway Company. Following an initial letter of enquiry by Gorton player Walter Chew to railway company estate agent Edwin Barker, Furniss and Chew negotiated a seven-month lease at a cost of £10, and the club changed its name to "Ardwick A.F.C." to reflect the new location. A few weeks later, using materials provided by the nearby Galloway engineering works, a rudimentary football ground was ready for use. The ground had no changing rooms, and teams changed in a nearby public house, the Hyde Road Hotel, where the football club held business meetings.

The ground's first seating area was built in 1888, with 1,000 seats, paid for by Chesters Brewery in return for the right to be the sole provider of alcohol inside the ground. Ardwick were admitted to the Football League in 1892. The first league match held at Hyde Road was a 7–0 Ardwick win against Bootle on 3 September 1892. Two years later the club reformed as "Manchester City F.C."

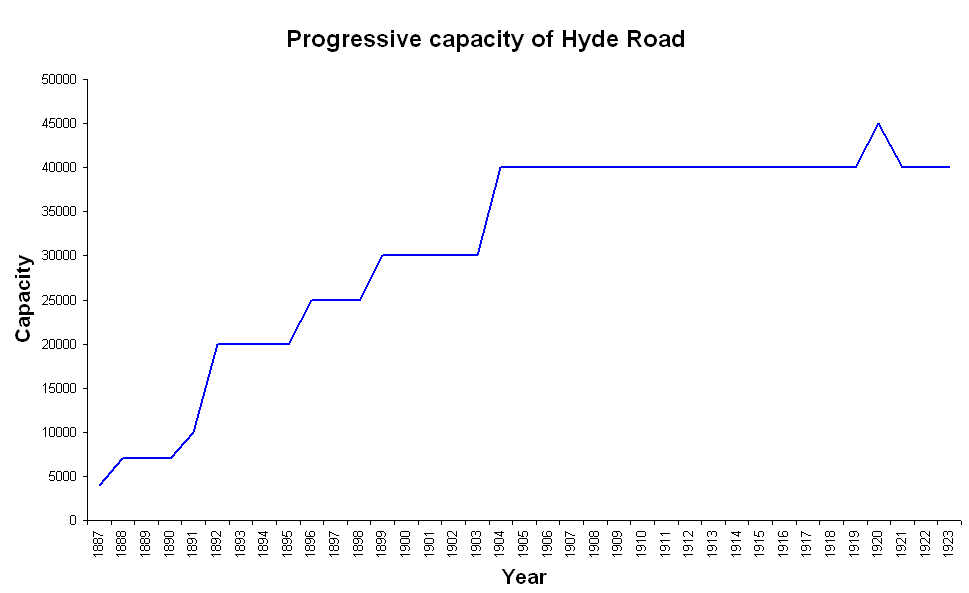
From less than 5,000 in 1887, Hyde Road's capacity reached 40,000 by 1904.

The increasing popularity of the football club resulted in improvements being made to the ground on several occasions. Improvements costing £600 were made in 1890, and changing rooms were provided in 1896. A new stand was purchased for £1,500 in 1898, and £2,000 worth of improvements were made in 1904, resulting in a capacity of 40,000 with stands on three sides. This development resulted in Hyde Road being chosen to host two prestigious matches—an inter-league match between the English League and the Irish League, and an FA Cup semi-final between Newcastle United and The Wednesday. In 1910 multi-span roofing was built on the three previously uncovered sides of the ground, resulting in covered accommodation for 35,000 spectators.

Even though improvements were made the ground suffered problems when hosting large crowds, due to narrow surrounding streets and a shortage of turnstiles. A reporter for the Manchester Football News summarised the access problems: "The croft is a nightmare in wet weather, and altogether the approach is easily the worst of any I know". On occasion, further problems occurred inside the ground as well as outside. A 1913 cup tie against Sunderland drew a crowd officially recorded as 41,709, but believed to be significantly higher. An hour before kick-off the gates were closed, with many ticket-holders unable to gain admission. The crowd was so large that once the match kicked off the crowd began to spill onto the pitch, a problem which worsened as the game progressed. Sunderland's Charles Buchan recalled that "Before half-time they were three or four yards inside the touchlines." A Sunderland goal in the 58th minute caused further encroachment, forcing the referee to abandon the match. An FA inquiry into the events on the terraces gave rise to debate on the issue of crowd control at sporting events. Use of mounted police was a particularly contentious issue, the chairman of the committee asking "If the ball struck a horse, and the creature plunged among the people, who was to be held responsible for any injuries that might accrue?" For years the club contemplated moving but between 1912 and 1914 renowned football stadium architect Archibald Leitch worked with the club to remodel the Hyde Road site.

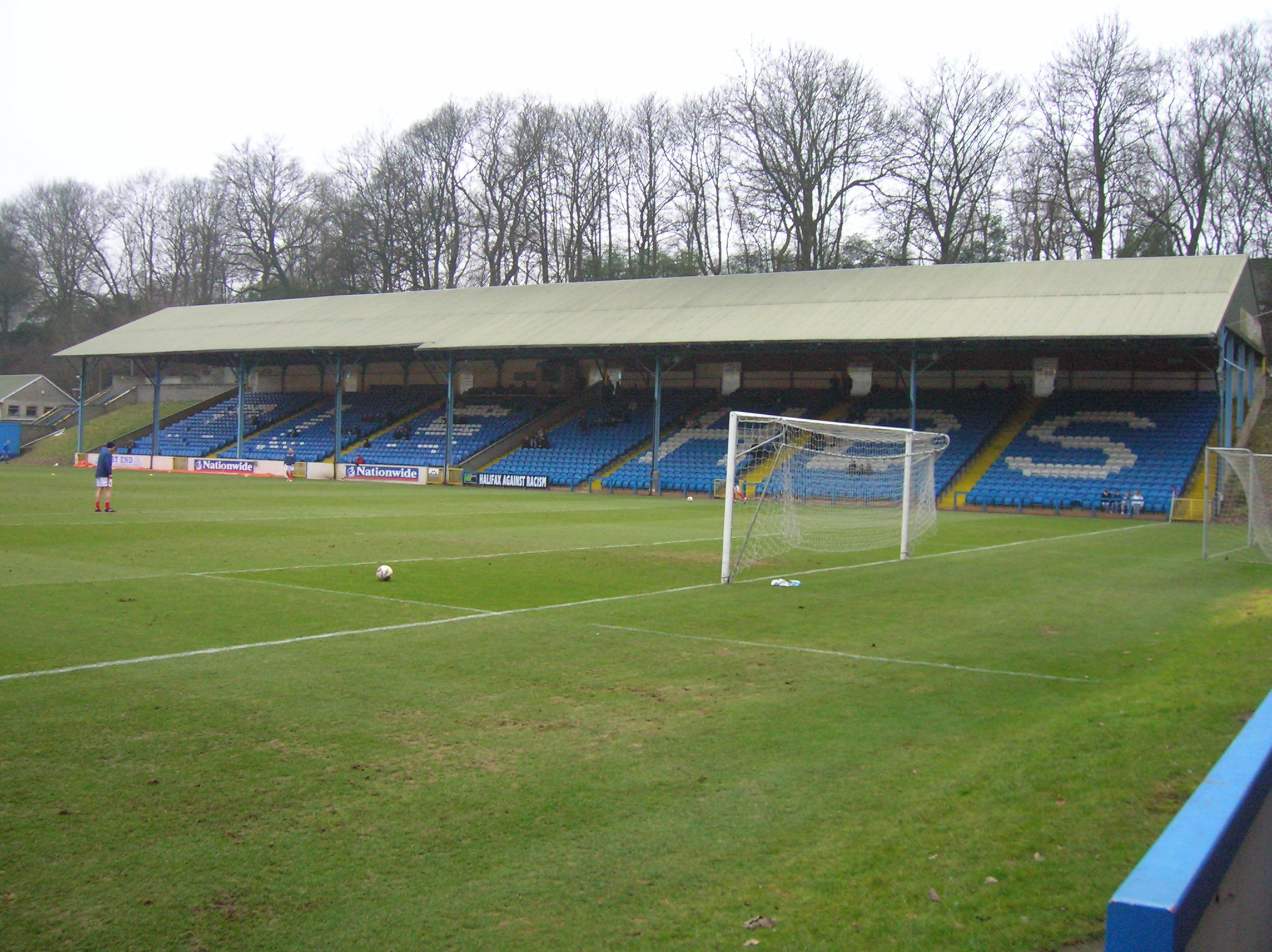
The Shay, Halifax, in 2006. The left hand portion of the pictured stand's roof was originally used at Hyde Road.

During the suspension of competitive football in the First World War, Hyde Road's redevelopment was put on hold and the venue was used to stable 300 horses. Later in the wartime period the club became the sole leaseholder of the ground, no longer dependent upon support from Chesters brewery. At this point the annual rent was £500. In 1920, the ground became the first football venue outside London to be visited by a reigning monarch; King George V attended the ground to watch a match between Manchester City and Liverpool. In November a fire caused by a cigarette end destroyed the Main Stand, and Manchester City began to seek a new home. Initial discussions raised the possibility of sharing Old Trafford with neighbours Manchester United, but United's proposed rent was prohibitive, so repair work was undertaken and Manchester City continued to play at Hyde Road.

Plans for the club to move to a new ground—Maine Road—in Moss Side were announced in 1922. The final Manchester City match at Hyde Road was a league fixture against Newcastle United on 28 April 1923, and in August 1923 a public practice game was the last football match played at Hyde Road. Manchester City began the 1923–24 season at Maine Road, which had an 80,000 capacity. Parts of Hyde Road were used elsewhere; the roof of the Main Stand was sold to Halifax Town, and erected at The Shay, where even in the 21st century, part of the Hyde Road roof is still in place. Within a decade, all traces of the football ground had disappeared from Hyde Road. The bulk of the area was taken over by Manchester Corporation Tramways department, whose major Hyde Road depot and works was alongside, for use as their Permanent Way yard for assembling and storing tramway rails and materials. The Tramways system also provided at this time a substantial parcels handling service within the city, using both vans and special parcels trams, and a new central parcels depot was built on the Bennett Street side of the former site, against the railway viaduct. After the end of Manchester's trams in 1949 (most of the old trams were scrapped on this site) it was used for storing old buses and as a bus drivers' training area. As of 2000, the site of the pitch is Olympic Freight Terminal, a container storage and warehousing facility.

== Layout and structure ==
For certain areas of the ground few photographs survive, however, a map dating from 1894 indicates that most of the terracing was of uneven shape, and that unusually, a section of railway line leading to a neighbouring boilerworks ran between the terrace and the pitch at one corner of the ground. The main grandstand (the "Main Stand") was situated at the north of the ground. Built in 1889 for £1,500, this structure replaced the original 1,000 capacity grandstand which had been built in 1888. The new grandstand comprised an upper tier of seating and a lower paddock. Most contemporary sources listed the capacity as 4,000, though it is unclear whether this refers to the seating capacity or the total capacity. The wooden stand was gutted by fire in 1920, causing the loss of both the stand and the club records, which were stored within.

The north-eastern end of the ground was known as the "Galloway End". It was intersected by a railway loop leading to the Galloway boilerworks. One part of the terracing was known as the "Boys Stand". This was a separate structure, slightly removed from the rest of the ground and positioned behind the railway loop line which transported boilers from Galloways Boiler Works. The opposing end, known as the "Stone Yard Stand" or "Hotel End", was another part of the ground with an irregular shape. It consisted of a mixture of seats and terracing, and became the most important seating area in the period following the Main Stand fire. The fourth side was a simple terrace, with a roof covering three-quarters of its length. It had a larger capacity than the other parts of the ground, and was therefore known as "The Popular Side". Part of the terrace stood back-to-back with a row of houses on Bennett Street; though the ground was named Hyde Road, its proximity to Bennett Street meant that for some supporters the names Hyde Road and Bennett Street were synonymous.

== Hyde Road Hotel ==
Adjacent to the ground was the Hyde Road Hotel, a public house in which the players got changed before the matches at the Hyde Road stadium. It served as the venue for several important events in the club's history, such as first meeting of Ardwick A.F.C. on 30 August 1887, and the 1894 decision to form Manchester City F.C. and register it as a company. During this period the owners of the Hyde Road Hotel, Chesters Brewery, had a large influence over the football club, leading Ardwick to be nicknamed "The Brewerymen".

During the 1980s the Hyde Road Hotel was owned by George Heslop, a former Manchester City player, and was renamed "The City Gates". The business failed, closing in 1989, and the building subsequently lay empty for more than a decade. Attempts to save the building were made by Manchester City supporters, without much progress. By May 2001, the building was demolished. Two keystones from the Hyde Road Hotel reside in the memorial garden at the club's home stadium since 2003, the City of Manchester Stadium.

== Bibliography ==
- James, Gary Farewell To Maine Road ISBN 1-899538-19-4
- James, Gary (1997). Manchester: The Greatest City (First ed.). Leicester: Polar. ISBN 1-899538-09-7.
- James, Gary (2002). Manchester: The Greatest City (Second ed.). Leicester: Polar. ISBN 1-899538-22-4.
- James, Gary (2006). Manchester City – The Complete Record. Derby: Breedon. ISBN 1-85983-512-0.
- Inglis, Simon (1987). The Football Grounds of Great Britain (Second ed.). London: Collins Willow. ISBN 0-00-218249-1.
- Clayton, David (2002). Everything under the blue moon: the complete book of Manchester City FC – and more!. Edinburgh: Mainstream publishing. ISBN 1-84018-687-9.
- Ward, Andrew (1984). The Manchester City Story. Derby: Breedon. ISBN 0-907969-05-4.
- Collins, Mick (2006). All-round Genius – The Unknown Story of Britain's Greatest Sportsman. London: Aurum Press. ISBN 1-84513-137-1.
