= 1925–26 Manchester City F.C. season =

English football club season

Manchester City F.C.
1925–26 season
- Manager: David Ashworth (until 14 Nov 1925); AlbertAlexander/Committee (15 Nov 1925 to 26 Apr 1926); Peter Hodge (from 26 Apr 1926)
- Football League First Division: 21st (relegated)
- FA Cup: Runner-up
- Top goalscorer: League: Tommy Browell (21); Frank Roberts (21); All: Frank Roberts (30)
- Highest home attendance: 62,994 v Manchester United (12 September 1925)
- Lowest home attendance: 7,000 v Sheffield United (4 November 1925)

The 1925–26 season was Manchester City F.C.'s thirty-fifth season of league football and twelfth consecutive season in the Football League First Division, excluding the four years during the First World War in which no competitive football was played.

Coming off the back of a series of mid-table finishes and largely unimpressive FA Cup campaigns, manager David Ashworth's resignation in November 1925 bizarrely resulted in both a first league relegation since 1909 and a first FA Cup final appearance since 1904 as well as a record 6–1 victory over rivals Manchester United, with much of the second half of the campaign being run in Ashworth's absence by a committee led by club Vice-chairman Albert Alexander.

== Football League First Division ==
Pos	Team	Pld	W	D	L	GF	GA	GAv	Pts	Relegation
18	West Ham United	42	15	7	20	63	76	0.829	37	
19	Leeds United	42	14	8	20	64	76	0.842	36	
20	Burnley	42	13	10	19	85	108	0.787	36	
21	Manchester City (R)	42	12	11	19	89	100	0.890	35	Relegation to the Second Division
22	Notts County (R)	42	13	7	22	54	74	0.730	33	Relegation to the Second Division

Source: World Football
Rules for classification: 1) Points; 2) Goal average; 3) Goals scored
(R) Relegated

=== Results summary ===
Overall								Home						Away					
Pld	W	D	L	GF	GA	GAv	Pts	W	D	L	GF	GA	Pts	W	D	L	GF	GA	Pts
42	12	11	19	89	100	0.89	35	8	7	6	48	42	23	4	4	13	41	58	12

Source: rsssf.com

=== Reports ===
Date	Opponents	H / A	Venue	Result F – A	Scorers	Attendance
29 August 1925	Cardiff City	H	Maine Road	3 – 2	Austin, Warner, Johnson	42,000
31 August 1925	Birmingham	A	St Andrew's	0 – 1		20,000
5 September 1925	Tottenham Hotspur	A	White Hart Lane	0 – 1		35,954
12 September 1925	Manchester United	H	Maine Road	1 – 1	Cowan	62,994
19 September 1925	Everton	H	Maine Road	4 – 4	Browell (4)	11,393
23 September 1925	West Bromwich Albion	A	The Hawthorns	1 – 4	Roberts	8,827
26 September 1925	Huddersfield Town	A	Leeds Road	2 – 2	Warner, Johnson	19,541
3 October 1925	Sunderland	H	Maine Road	4 – 1	Austin (2), Warner, Browell	40,000
10 October 1925	Blackburn Rovers	A	Ewood Park	3 – 3	Browell (2), Roberts	25,935
17 October 1925	Liverpool	A	Anfield	1 – 2	Johnson	35,000
24 October 1925	Burnley	H	Maine Road	8 – 3	Browell (5), Roberts, Johnson, Hicks	19,740
26 October 1925	Sheffield United	A	Bramall Lane	3 – 8	Cowan, Roberts, Johnson	8,000
31 October 1925	West Ham United	A	Upton Park	1 – 3	Browell	23,000
4 November 1925	Sheffield United	H	Maine Road	2 – 4	Austin, Roberts	7,000
7 November 1925	Arsenal	H	Maine Road	2 – 5	Warner, Browell	11,384
14 November 1925	Bolton Wanderers	A	Burnden Park	1 – 5	Roberts	22,326
21 November 1925	Notts County	H	Maine Road	1 – 1	Coupland	20,000
28 November 1925	Aston Villa	A	Villa Park	1 – 3	Dennison	25,000
5 December 1925	Leicester City	H	Maine Road	5 – 1	Roberts (2), Johnson (2), Dennison	20,000
12 December 1925	Leeds United	A	Elland Road	4 – 3	Bradford, Dennison, Johnson, Roberts	18,762
19 December 1925	Newcastle United	H	Maine Road	2 – 2	Johnson, Murphy	35,000
25 December 1925	Bury	A	Gigg Lane	5 – 6	Browell (2), Coupland, Johnson, Roberts	25,000
26 December 1925	Bury	H	Maine Road	0 – 2		50,000
1 January 1926	West Bromwich Albion	H	Maine Road	3 – 1	Austin, Dennison, Johnson	23,030
2 January 1926	Cardiff City	A	Ninian Park	2 – 2	Roberts (2)	12,000
16 January 1926	Tottenham Hotspur	H	Maine Road	0 – 0		25,344
23 January 1926	Manchester United	A	Old Trafford	6 – 1	Austin (2), Roberts (2), Johnson, Hicks	48,657
6 February 1926	Huddersfield Town	H	Maine Road	1 – 5	Roberts	36,645
10 February 1926	Everton	A	Goodison Park	1 – 1	Roberts	15,067
13 February 1926	Sunderland	A	Roker Park	3 – 5	Austin, Browell, Hicks	25,000
27 February 1926	Liverpool	H	Maine Road	1 – 1	Browell	35,000
13 March 1926	West Ham United	H	Maine Road	2 – 0	Roberts, Murphy	40,000
17 March 1926	Blackburn Rovers	H	Maine Road	0 – 1		18,793
20 March 1926	Arsenal	A	Highbury	0 – 1		34,974
29 March 1926	Bolton Wanderers	H	Maine Road	1 – 1	Austin	21,720
2 April 1926	Birmingham	H	Maine Road	2 – 4	Austin, Hicks	60,000
3 April 1926	Notts County	A	Meadow Lane	0 – 1		12,000
6 April 1926	Burnley	A	Turf Moor	2 – 1	Johnson, Hicks	19,966
10 April 1926	Aston Villa	H	Maine Road	4 – 2	Austin, Browell, Roberts, Johnson	42,000
17 April 1926	Leicester City	A	Filbert Street	3 – 2	Roberts (2), Browell	20,000
27 April 1926	Leeds United	H	Maine Road	2 – 1	Austin, Johnson	43,375
1 May 1926	Newcastle United	A	St James' Park	2 – 3	Browell, Roberts	20,000

=== FA Cup ===
Date	Round	Opponents	H / A	Venue	Result F – A	Scorers	Attendance
9 January 1926	Third round	Corinthian	A	Crystal Palace	3 – 3	Cookson, Roberts, Hicks	29,700
13 January 1926	Third round replay	Corinthian	H	Maine Road	4 – 0	Austin (2), Johnson, Hicks	42,303
30 January 1926	Fourth round	Huddersfield Town	H	Maine Road	4 – 0	Hicks (2), Browell, Roberts	74,789
20 February 1926	Fifth round	Crystal Palace	H	Maine Road	11 – 4	Roberts (5), Browell (3), Austin, Johnson, Hicks	51,630
6 March 1926	Sixth round	Clapton Orient	A	Maine Road	6 – 1	Johnson (3), Hicks, Roberts, Browell	24,600
27 March 1926	Semi-final	Manchester United	N	Bramhall Lane	3 – 0	Browell (2), Roberts	46,450
24 April 1926	Final	Bolton Wanderers	N	Wembley	0 – 1		91,547

== Squad statistics ==
=== Squad ===
Appearances for competitive matches only

Nat.	Player	Pos.	Premier League		FA Cup		Total	
Nat.	Player	Pos.	Apps	Goal	Apps	Goal	Apps	Goal
(England)	Jim Goodchild	GK	24	0	7	0	31	0
(England)	James Mitchell	GK	17	0	0	0	17	0
(Wales)	John Phillips	GK	1	0	0	0	1	0
	Fred Appleton	DF	1	0	1	0	2	0
(England)	Sam Cookson	DF	35	0	6	1	41	1
(England)	Eli Fletcher	DF	1	0	0	0	1	0
(Scotland)	Philip McCloy	DF	37	0	4	0	41	0
	Robert Benzie	MF	7	0	0	0	7	0
	Baggy Coupland	MF	23	2	4	0	27	2
(England)	Sam Cowan	MF	39	2	6	0	45	2
(Republic of Ireland)	Jimmy Elwood	MF	4	0	0	0	4	0
(Scotland)	Jimmy McMullan	MF	10	0	3	0	13	0
(England)	Spud Murphy	MF	9	2	0	0	9	2
(Scotland)	Charlie Pringle	MF	36	0	7	0	43	0
(England)	Sammy Sharp	MF	8	0	0	0	8	0
(England)	Billy Austin	FW	36	12	7	3	43	15
	Leo Bradford	FW	5	1	0	0	5	1
(England)	Tommy Browell	FW	32	21	5	7	37	28
	James Calderwood	FW	2	0	2	0	4	0
(England)	Arthur Daniels	FW	1	0	0	0	1	0
	Bob Dennison	FW	8	4	2	0	10	4
(England)	George Hicks	FW	35	5	7	6	42	11
(England)	Tommy Johnson	FW	38	15	7	5	45	20
(England)	Frank Roberts	FW	38	21	7	9	45	30
(England)	Frank Thompson	FW	9	0	1	0	10	0
(England)	Jack Warner	FW	7	4	0	0	7	4
Own goals				0		0		0
Totals				89		31		120

=== Scorers ===
Nat.	Player	Pos.	Football League	FA Cup	TOTAL
(England)	Frank Roberts	FW	21	9	30
(England)	Tommy Browell	FW	21	7	28
(England)	Tommy Johnson	FW	15	5	20
(England)	Billy Austin	FW	12	3	15
(England)	George Hicks	FW	5	6	11
(England)	Bob Dennison	FW	4	0	4
(England)	Jack Warner	FW	4	0	4
	Baggy Coupland	MF	2	0	2
(England)	Sam Cowan	MF	2	0	2
(England)	Sam Cookson	MF	0	1	1
	Leo Bradford	FW	1	0	1
Own Goals			0	0	0
Totals			89	31	120

== See also ==
- Manchester City F.C. seasons
