= 1927–28 Manchester City F.C. season =

English football club season

Manchester City F.C.
1927–28 season
- Manager: Peter Hodge
- Football League Second Division: 1st (promoted)
- FA Cup: Fifth round
- Top goalscorer: League: Frank Roberts (20); All: Tommy Johnson; Frank Roberts (both 20)
- Highest home attendance: 73,668 v Stoke City (18 February 1928)
- Lowest home attendance: 20,000 v Notts County (24 December 1927); 20,000 v Wolves (31 December 1927)

The 1927–28 season was Manchester City F.C.'s thirty-seventh season of league football and second season in the Football League Second Division, which they won for the fourth time in their history.

== Football League Second Division ==
| Pos | Team | Pld | W | D | L | GF | GA | GAv | Pts | Promotion or relegation |
|---|---|---|---|---|---|---|---|---|---|---|
| 1 | Manchester City (C, P) | 42 | 25 | 9 | 8 | 100 | 59 | 1.695 | 59 | Promotion to the First Division |
| 2 | Leeds United (P) | 42 | 25 | 7 | 10 | 98 | 49 | 2.000 | 57 | Promotion to the First Division |
| 3 | Chelsea | 42 | 23 | 8 | 11 | 75 | 45 | 1.667 | 54 | |
| 4 | Preston North End | 42 | 22 | 9 | 11 | 100 | 66 | 1.515 | 53 | |
| 5 | Stoke City | 42 | 22 | 8 | 12 | 78 | 59 | 1.322 | 52 | |

(C) Champions; (P) Promoted

=== Results summary ===
| Overall | | | | | | | | Home | | | | | | Away | | | | | |
| Pld | W | D | L | GF | GA | GAv | Pts | W | D | L | GF | GA | Pts | W | D | L | GF | GA | Pts |
|---|---|---|---|---|---|---|---|---|---|---|---|---|---|---|---|---|---|---|---|
| 42 | 25 | 9 | 8 | 100 | 59 | 1.695 | 59 | 18 | 2 | 1 | 70 | 27 | 38 | 7 | 7 | 7 | 30 | 32 | 21 |

Source: rsssf.com

=== Reports ===
| Date | Opponents | H / A | Venue | Result F – A | Scorers | Attendance |
|---|---|---|---|---|---|---|
| 27 August 1927 | Wolverhampton Wanderers | A | Molineux | 2 – 2 | McMullan, Hicks | 30,000 |
| 29 August 1927 | Swansea Town | H | Maine Road | 7 – 4 | Johnson (3), Broadhurst, Hicks, Roberts, Bell | 40,000 |
| 3 September 1927 | Port Vale | H | Maine Road | 1 – 0 | Johnson | 34,000 |
| 5 September 1927 | Swansea Town | A | Vetch Field | 3 – 5 | Bell, Johnson, Hicks | 13,000 |
| 10 September 1927 | South Shields | A | Talbot Road | 1 – 0 | McMullan | 9,000 |
| 17 September 1927 | Leeds United | H | Maine Road | 2 – 1 | Johnson (2) | 40,391 |
| 24 September 1927 | Nottingham Forest | A | City Ground | 5 – 4 | Johnson (2), Hicks (2), Broadhurst | 12,893 |
| 1 October 1927 | Oldham Athletic | H | Maine Road | 3 – 1 | Broadhurst (2), Johnson | 25,216 |
| 8 October 1927 | Hull City | H | Maine Road | 2 – 1 | Barrass (2) | 42,038 |
| 15 October 1927 | Preston North End | A | Deepdale | 0 – 1 | | 28,000 |
| 22 October 1927 | Blackpool | A | Bloomfield Road | 2 – 2 | Roberts, Hicks | 17,013 |
| 29 October 1927 | Reading | H | Maine Road | 4 – 1 | Austin (2), Roberts, Johnson | 35,000 |
| 5 November 1927 | Grimsby Town | A | Blundell Park | 1 – 4 | Smelt | 12,522 |
| 12 November 1927 | Chelsea | H | Maine Road | 0 – 1 | | 52,830 |
| 19 November 1927 | Clapton Orient | A | Millfields Road | 2 – 0 | Austin, Roberts | 14,129 |
| 26 November 1927 | Stoke City | H | Maine Road | 4 – 0 | Austin, Allan, Roberts, Johnson | 40,000 |
| 3 December 1927 | Bristol City | A | Ashton Gate | 0 – 2 | | 30,000 |
| 10 December 1927 | West Bromwich Albion | H | Maine Road | 3 – 1 | Austin, Broadhurst, Johnson | 25,000 |
| 17 December 1927 | Southampton | A | The Dell | 1 – 1 | Broadhurst | 12,000 |
| 24 December 1927 | Notts County | H | Maine Road | 3 – 1 | Broadhurst (2), Hicks | 20,000 |
| 26 December 1927 | Barnsley | A | Oakwell | 3 – 0 | Broadhurst (2), Roberts | 17,000 |
| 31 December 1927 | Wolverhampton Wanderers | H | Maine Road | 3 – 0 | Johnson (2), Broadhurst | 20,000 |
| 2 January 1928 | Barnsley | H | Maine Road | 7 – 3 | Austin (2), Gorringe (2), McMullan, Roberts, Johnson | 30,000 |
| 7 January 1928 | Port Vale | A | Recreation Ground | 2 – 1 | Roberts, Hicks | 15,000 |
| 21 January 1928 | South Shields | H | Maine Road | 3 – 0 | Austin, Broadhurst, Johnson | 30,000 |
| 4 February 1928 | Nottingham Forest | H | Maine Road | 3 – 3 | Broadhurst, Austin, Hicks | 30,037 |
| 11 February 1928 | Oldham Athletic | A | Boundary Park | 2 – 3 | Bell, Broadhurst | 25,426 |
| 25 February 1928 | Preston North End | H | Maine Road | 2 – 2 | Roberts (2) | 60,000 |
| 3 March 1928 | Blackpool | H | Maine Road | 4 – 1 | Roberts (4) | 40,906 |
| 10 March 1928 | Reading | A | Elm Park | 1 – 1 | Marshall | 12,000 |
| 17 March 1928 | Grimsby Town | H | Maine Road | 2 – 0 | Roberts, McMullan | 49,185 |
| 24 March 1928 | Chelsea | A | Stamford Bridge | 1 – 0 | Roberts | 51,813 |
| 31 March 1928 | Clapton Orient | H | Maine Road | 5 – 3 | Roberts (3), Horne, Brook | 38,272 |
| 6 April 1928 | Fulham | H | Maine Road | 2 – 1 | Marshall, Roberts | 30,000 |
| 7 April 1928 | Stoke City | A | Victoria Ground | 0 – 2 | | 30,000 |
| 9 April 1928 | Fulham | A | Craven Cottage | 1 – 1 | Tait | 27,000 |
| 14 April 1928 | Bristol City | H | Maine Road | 4 – 2 | Tait, Johnson, Marshall, Hicks | 30,000 |
| 16 April 1928 | Hull City | A | Anlaby Road | 0 – 0 | | 6,088 |
| 21 April 1928 | West Bromwich Albion | A | The Hawthorns | 1 – 1 | Brook | 14,238 |
| 25 April 1928 | Leeds United | A | Elland Road | 1 – 0 | Tait | 48,470 |
| 28 April 1928 | Southampton | H | Maine Road | 6 – 1 | Marshall (3), Tait, Johnson, Horne | 40,000 |
| 5 May 1928 | Notts County | A | Meadow Lane | 1 – 2 | Marshall | 6,000 |

=== FA Cup ===
| Date | Round | Opponents | H / A | Venue | Result F – A | Scorers | Attendance |
|---|---|---|---|---|---|---|---|
| 14 January 1928 | Third round | Leeds United | H | Maine Road | 1 – 0 | Johnson | 50,473 |
| 28 January 1928 | Fourth round | Sunderland | A | Roker Park | 2 – 1 | Broadhurst, Hicks | 38,658 |
| 18 February 1928 | Fifth round | Stoke City | H | Maine Road | 0 – 1 | | 73,668 |

== Squad statistics ==
=== Squad ===
Appearances for competitive matches only

| Nat. | Player | Pos. | Premier League | | FA Cup | | Total | |
| Nat. | Player | Pos. | Apps | Goal | Apps | Goal | Apps | Goal |
|---|---|---|---|---|---|---|---|---|
| | Lewis Barber | GK | 10 | 0 | 1 | 0 | 11 | 0 |
| (Wales) | Bert Gray | GK | 32 | 0 | 2 | 0 | 34 | 0 |
| | Fred Appleton | DF | 1 | 0 | 1 | 0 | 2 | 0 |
| (England) | Eddie Bennett | DF | 5 | 0 | 0 | 0 | 5 | 0 |
| (England) | Sam Cookson | DF | 11 | 0 | 0 | 0 | 11 | 0 |
| (Scotland) | Philip McCloy | DF | 38 | 0 | 3 | 0 | 41 | 0 |
| (England) | George Robertson | DF | 2 | 0 | 0 | 0 | 2 | 0 |
| (England) | Sam Cowan | MF | 28 | 0 | 2 | 0 | 30 | 0 |
| (England) | Syd Gibbons | MF | 4 | 0 | 1 | 0 | 5 | 0 |
| (Scotland) | Jimmy McMullan | MF | 38 | 4 | 3 | 0 | 41 | 4 |
| (Scotland) | Charlie Pringle | MF | 22 | 0 | 1 | 0 | 23 | 0 |
| (England) | Sammy Sharp | MF | 11 | 0 | 0 | 0 | 11 | 0 |
| | John Allan | FW | 5 | 1 | 1 | 0 | 6 | 1 |
| (England) | Billy Austin | FW | 18 | 9 | 2 | 0 | 20 | 9 |
| (England) | Matt Barrass | FW | 28 | 2 | 2 | 0 | 30 | 2 |
| (England) | Peter Bell | FW | 16 | 3 | 0 | 0 | 16 | 3 |
| (England) | Charles Broadhurst | FW | 21 | 14 | 3 | 1 | 24 | 15 |
| (England) | Eric Brook | FW | 12 | 2 | 0 | 0 | 12 | 2 |
| | Clifford Foster | FW | 3 | 0 | 0 | 0 | 3 | 0 |
| | Fred Gorringe | FW | 1 | 2 | 0 | 0 | 1 | 2 |
| (England) | George Hicks | FW | 28 | 10 | 3 | 1 | 31 | 11 |
| (England) | Alf Horne | FW | 7 | 2 | 0 | 0 | 7 | 2 |
| (England) | Tommy Johnson | FW | 35 | 19 | 3 | 1 | 38 | 20 |
| (England) | Bobby Marshall | FW | 14 | 7 | 0 | 0 | 14 | 7 |
| (England) | John Ridley | FW | 30 | 0 | 3 | 0 | 33 | 0 |
| (England) | Frank Roberts | FW | 24 | 20 | 3 | 0 | 27 | 20 |
| | Tom Smelt | FW | 2 | 1 | 0 | 0 | 2 | 1 |
| (England) | Tommy Tait | FW | 7 | 4 | 0 | 0 | 7 | 4 |
| (England) | Fred Tilson | FW | 6 | 0 | 0 | 0 | 6 | 0 |
| Own goals | | | | 0 | | 0 | | 0 |
| Totals | | | | 100 | | 3 | | 103 |

=== Scorers ===
| Nat. | Player | Pos. | Football League | FA Cup | TOTAL |
|---|---|---|---|---|---|
| (England) | Tommy Johnson | FW | 19 | 1 | 20 |
| (England) | Frank Roberts | FW | 20 | 0 | 20 |
| (England) | Charles Broadhurst | FW | 15 | 1 | 16 |
| (England) | George Hicks | FW | 10 | 1 | 11 |
| (England) | Billy Austin | FW | 9 | 0 | 9 |
| (England) | Bobby Marshall | FW | 7 | 0 | 7 |
| (Scotland) | Jimmy McMullan | MF | 4 | 0 | 4 |
| (England) | Tommy Tait | FW | 4 | 0 | 4 |
| (England) | Peter Bell | FW | 3 | 0 | 3 |
| (England) | Matt Barrass | FW | 2 | 0 | 2 |
| (England) | Eric Brook | FW | 2 | 0 | 2 |
| | Fred Gorringe | FW | 2 | 0 | 2 |
| (England) | Alf Horne | FW | 2 | 0 | 2 |
| | John Allan | FW | 1 | 0 | 1 |
| | Tom Smelt | FW | 1 | 0 | 1 |
| Own Goals | | | 0 | 0 | 0 |
| Totals | | | 100 | 3 | 103 |

== See also ==
- Manchester City F.C. seasons
