= 1924–25 Manchester City F.C. season =

English football club season

Manchester City F.C.
1924–25 season
- Manager: David Ashworth
- Football League First Division: 10th
- FA Cup: First round
- Top goalscorer: League: Frank Roberts (32); All: Frank Roberts (31)
- Highest home attendance: 50,000 v H'field (18 October 1924); 50,000 v Bolton (25 October 1924)
- Lowest home attendance: 12,000 v Sheff. Utd (23 February 1925)

The 1924–25 season was Manchester City F.C.'s thirty-fourth season of league football, and eleventh consecutive season in the Football League First Division, excluding the four years during the First World War in which no competitive football was played.

The season was the first season for twelve years in which then-longest serving manager Ernest Mangnall was not at the helm of the club. In his place David Ashworth was appointed as manager.

== Football League First Division ==
Pos	Team	Pld	W	D	L	GF	GA	GAv	Pts
8	Birmingham	42	17	12	13	49	53	0.925	46
9	Notts County	42	16	13	13	42	31	1.355	45
10	Manchester City	42	17	9	16	76	68	1.118	43
11	Cardiff City	42	16	11	15	56	51	1.098	43
12	Tottenham Hotspur	42	15	12	15	52	43	1.209	42

Source: World Football
Rules for classification: 1) Points; 2) Goal average; 3) Goals scored

=== Results summary ===
Overall								Home						Away					
Pld	W	D	L	GF	GA	GAv	Pts	W	D	L	GF	GA	Pts	W	D	L	GF	GA	Pts
42	17	9	16	76	68	1.118	43	11	7	3	44	29	29	6	2	13	32	39	14

Source: rsssf.com

=== Reports ===
Date	Opponents	H / A	Venue	Result F – A	Scorers	Attendance
30 August 1924	Bury	A	Gigg Lane	2 – 0	Roberts (2)	40,000
1 September 1924	Arsenal	A	Highbury	0 – 1		25,000
6 September 1924	Nottingham Forest	H	Maine Road	4 – 2	Barnes (2), Murphy, Roberts	31,000
13 September 1924	Liverpool	A	Anfield	3 – 5	Roberts (2), Barnes	30,000
17 September 1924	Arsenal	H	Maine Road	2 – 0	Johnson, Barnes	34,000
20 September 1924	Newcastle United	H	Maine Road	3 – 1	Roberts (2), Johnson	35,000
27 September 1924	Sheffield United	A	Bramall Lane	5 – 0	Roberts (3), Johnson, Barnes	20,000
4 October 1924	West Ham United	H	Maine Road	3 – 1	Roberts (2), Barnes	46,000
11 October 1924	Blackburn Rovers	A	Ewood Park	1 – 3	Barnes	30,000
18 October 1924	Huddersfield Town	H	Maine Road	1 – 1	Barnes	50,000
25 October 1924	Bolton Wanderers	H	Maine Road	2 – 2	Roberts, Johnson	50,000
29 October 1924	Everton	A	Goodison Park	1 – 3	Johnson	20,000
1 November 1924	Notts County	A	Meadow Lane	0 – 2		12,000
8 November 1924	Everton	H	Maine Road	2 – 2	Austin, Roberts	30,000
10 November 1924	Tottenham Hotspur	A	White Hart Lane	1 – 1	Roberts	11,000
15 November 1924	Sunderland	A	Roker Park	2 – 3	Johnson, Murphy	20,000
22 November 1924	Cardiff City	H	Maine Road	2 – 2	Roberts (2)	18,000
29 November 1924	Preston North End	A	Deepdale	3 – 2	Austin, Roberts, Warner	22,000
6 December 1924	Burnley	H	Maine Road	3 – 3	Austin, Roberts, Browell	20,000
13 December 1924	Leeds United	A	Elland Road	3 – 0	Roberts, Browell, Murphy	15,000
20 December 1924	Birmingham	H	Maine Road	2 – 2	Austin, Browell	40,000
25 December 1924	West Bromwich Albion	H	Maine Road	1 – 2	Browell	35,000
26 December 1924	West Bromwich Albion	A	The Hawthorns	1 – 3	Johnson	50,000
3 January 1925	Nottingham Forest	A	City Ground	3 – 0	Johnson (2), Cowan	8,000
17 January 1925	Liverpool	H	Maine Road	5 – 0	Roberts (4), Woosnam	25,000
24 January 1925	Newcastle United	A	St James' Park	0 – 2		25,000
31 January 1925	Bury	H	Maine Road	0 – 0		15,000
7 February 1925	West Ham United	A	Upton Park	0 – 4		25,000
14 February 1925	Blackburn Rovers	H	Maine Road	1 – 3	Roberts	31,000
21 February 1925	Huddersfield Town	A	Leeds Road	1 – 1	Roberts	18,000
23 February 1925	Sheffield United	H	Maine Road	2 – 1	Roberts (2)	12,000
28 February 1925	Bolton Wanderers	A	Burnden Park	2 – 4	Daniels, Hicks	25,000
7 March 1925	Notts County	H	Maine Road	2 – 1	Roberts (2)	25,000
21 March 1925	Sunderland	H	Maine Road	1 – 3	Roberts	30,000
1 April 1925	Cardiff City	A	Ninian Park	2 – 0	Austin, Johnson	8,000
4 April 1925	Preston North End	H	Maine Road	2 – 1	Warner, Browell	20,000
10 April 1925	Aston Villa	A	Villa Park	1 – 2	Hicks	20,000
11 April 1925	Burnley	A	Turf Moor	0 – 1		14,000
13 April 1925	Aston Villa	H	Maine Road	1 – 0	Warner	25,000
18 April 1925	Leeds United	H	Maine Road	4 – 2	Austin, Browell, Johnson, Hicks	14,000
25 April 1925	Birmingham	A	St Andrew's	1 – 2	Johnson	13,000
2 May 1925	Tottenham Hotspur	H	Maine Road	1 – 0	Warner	15,000

=== FA Cup ===
Date	Round	Opponents	H / A	Venue	Result F – A	Scorers	Attendance
10 January 1925	First round	Preston North End	A	Deepdale	1 – 4	Roberts	24,536

== Squad statistics ==
=== Squad ===
Appearances for competitive matches only

Nat.	Player	Pos.	Premier League		FA Cup		Total	
Nat.	Player	Pos.	Apps	Goal	Apps	Goal	Apps	Goal
(England)	Jim Goodchild	GK	13	0	0	0	13	0
(England)	James Mitchell	GK	29	0	1	0	30	0
(England)	Sam Cookson	DF	37	0	0	0	37	0
(England)	Eli Fletcher	DF	27	0	1	0	28	0
(England)	Max Woosnam	DF	2	1	1	0	3	1
	Robert Benzie	MF	1	0	0	0	1	0
(England)	Sam Cowan	MF	21	1	0	0	21	1
(Republic of Ireland)	Jimmy Elwood	MF	15	0	0	0	15	0
	James McCourt	MF	4	0	0	0	4	0
(England)	Spud Murphy	MF	24	3	0	0	24	3
(Scotland)	Charlie Pringle	MF	35	0	1	0	36	0
(England)	Sammy Sharp	MF	40	0	1	0	41	0
(England)	Billy Wilson	MF	12	0	0	0	12	0
(England)	Billy Austin	FW	38	6	1	0	39	6
(England)	Horace Barnes	FW	14	8	0	0	14	8
(England)	Tommy Browell	FW	14	6	1	0	15	6
	James Calderwood	FW	14	0	0	0	14	0
(England)	Arthur Daniels	FW	9	1	0	0	9	1
(England)	George Hicks	FW	15	3	1	0	16	3
(England)	Tommy Johnson	FW	41	12	1	0	42	12
(England)	Frank Roberts	FW	38	31	1	1	39	32
(England)	Frank Thompson	FW	7	0	1	0	8	0
(England)	Jack Warner	FW	12	4	0	0	12	4
Own goals				0		0		0
Totals				76		1		77

=== Scorers ===
Nat.	Player	Pos.	Football League	FA Cup	TOTAL
(England)	Frank Roberts	FW	31	1	32
(England)	Tommy Johnson	FW	12	0	12
(England)	Horace Barnes	FW	8	0	8
(England)	Billy Austin	FW	6	0	6
(England)	Tommy Browell	FW	6	0	6
(England)	Jack Warner	FW	4	0	4
(England)	Spud Murphy	MF	3	0	3
(England)	George Hicks	FW	3	0	3
(England)	Max Woosnam	DF	1	0	1
(England)	Sam Cowan	MF	1	0	1
(England)	Arthur Daniels	FW	1	0	1
Own Goals			0	0	0
Totals			76	1	77

== See also ==
- Manchester City F.C. seasons
