= 1926–27 Manchester City F.C. season =

English football club season

Manchester City F.C.
1926–27 season
- Manager: Peter Hodge
- Football League Second Division: 3rd
- FA Cup: Third round
- Top goalscorer: League: Tommy Johnson (25); All: Tommy Johnson (25)
- Highest home attendance: 48,689 v N. Forest (19 Feb. 1927)
- Lowest home attendance: 12,000 v S. Shields (27 Nov. 1926)
Home colours

The 1926–27 season was Manchester City F.C.'s thirty-sixth season of league football and first season back in the Football League Second Division since the 1909–10 season, and the first time they had been in the Second Division without achieving promotion since 1898.

== Football League Second Division ==
Pos	Team	Pld	W	D	L	GF	GA	GAv	Pts	Promotion or relegation
1	Middlesbrough (C, P)	42	27	8	7	122	60	2.033	62	Promotion to the First Division
2	Portsmouth (P)	42	23	8	11	87	49	1.776	54	Promotion to the First Division
3	Manchester City	42	22	10	10	108	61	1.770	54	
4	Chelsea	42	20	12	10	62	52	1.192	52	
5	Nottingham Forest	42	18	14	10	80	55	1.455	50	

(C) Champions; (P) Promoted

=== Results summary ===
Overall								Home						Away					
Pld	W	D	L	GF	GA	GAv	Pts	W	D	L	GF	GA	Pts	W	D	L	GF	GA	Pts
42	22	10	10	108	61	1.77	54	15	3	3	65	23	33	7	7	7	43	38	21

Source: rsssf.com

=== Reports ===
Date	Opponents	H / A	Venue	Result F – A	Scorers	Attendance
28 August 1926	Fulham	H	Maine Road	4 – 2	Austin, Barrass, Roberts, Hicks	34,000
1 September 1926	Portsmouth	H	Maine Road	4 – 0	Roberts (2), Johnson, Hicks	25,000
4 September 1926	Grimsby Town	A	Blundell Park	2 – 2	Roberts, Johnson	16,599
6 September 1926	Oldham Athletic	A	Boundary Park	2 – 1	Pringle, Austin	26,009
11 September 1926	Blackpool	H	Maine Road	2 – 1	Austin, Johnson	34,885
18 September 1926	Reading	A	Elm Park	0 – 1		24,000
22 September 1926	Oldham Athletic	H	Maine Road	3 – 0	Roberts, Johnson, Hicks	25,676
25 September 1926	Swansea Town	H	Maine Road	3 – 1	Roberts, Johnson, Hicks	35,000
2 October 1926	Nottingham Forest	A	City Ground	3 – 3	Johnson (2), B. Cowan	15,121
9 October 1926	Barnsley	H	Maine Road	1 – 1	Hicks	18,000
16 October 1926	Southampton	H	Maine Road	3 – 4	McMullan, Austin, Johnson	30,000
23 October 1926	Port Vale	A	Recreation Ground	2 – 0	McMullan, Johnson	14,000
30 October 1926	Clapton Orient	H	Maine Road	6 – 1	Barrass (3), Roberts (2), Johnson	28,979
6 November 1926	Notts County	A	Meadow Lane	0 – 1		6,000
13 November 1926	Wolverhampton Wanderers	H	Maine Road	2 – 1	McMullan, Austin	15,000
20 November 1926	Hull City	A	Anlaby Road	2 – 3	Barrass, Johnson	11,582
27 November 1926	South Shields	H	Maine Road	1 – 2	Barrass	12,000
4 December 1926	Preston North End	A	Deepdale	4 – 2	Austin (3), Barrass	25,000
11 December 1926	Chelsea	H	Maine Road	1 – 0	Bell	26,868
18 December 1926	Bradford City	A	Valley Parade	3 – 4	Hicks (2), Roberts	17,580
25 December 1926	Middlesbrough	H	Maine Road	3 – 5	S. Cowan, B. Cowan, Johnson	44,077
27 December 1926	Middlesbrough	A	Ayresome Park	1 – 2	Roberts	43,753
1 January 1927	Portsmouth	A	Fratton Park	1 – 2	Johnson	20,000
15 January 1927	Fulham	A	Craven Cottage	5 – 2	Gibson (2), Austin, B. Cowan, S. Cowan	24,000
22 January 1927	Grimsby Town	H	Maine Road	2 – 0	Johnson, Hicks	21,212
29 January 1927	Blackpool	A	Bloomfield Road	4 – 2	Hicks (2), B. Cowan, Johnson	9,223
5 February 1927	Reading	H	Maine Road	3 – 0	Roberts, Hicks, O.G.(Evans)	30,000
12 February 1927	Swansea Town	A	Vetch Field	3 – 1	Johnson (2), Hicks	20,000
19 February 1927	Nottingham Forest	H	Maine Road	1 – 1	B. Cowan	48,689
26 February 1927	Barnsley	A	Oakwell	1 – 1	B. Cowan	14,000
12 March 1927	Port Vale	H	Maine Road	4 – 1	Johnson (2), B. Cowan, Hicks	30,000
19 March 1927	Clapton Orient	A	Millfields Road	4 – 2	Hicks (3), Austin	15,141
26 March 1927	Notts County	H	Maine Road	4 – 1	B. Cowan (2), Hicks (2)	15,000
2 April 1927	Wolverhampton Wanderers	A	Molineux	1 – 4	B. Cowan	11,361
9 April 1927	Hull City	H	Maine Road	2 – 2	B. Cowan, Bell	21,508
15 April 1927	Darlington	A	Feethams	2 – 2	Broadhurst, Johnson	10,000
16 April 1927	South Shields	A	Talbot Road	2 – 2	Roberts, Hicks	6,000
18 April 1927	Darlington	H	Maine Road	7 – 0	Broadhurst (4), Johnson (2), Bell	40,000
23 April 1927	Preston North End	H	Maine Road	1 – 0	Hicks	40,000
25 April 1927	Southampton	A	The Dell	1 – 1	Roberts	8,000
30 April 1927	Chelsea	A	Stamford Bridge	0 – 0		39,995
7 May 1927	Bradford City	H	Maine Road	8 – 0	Johnson (3), Broadhurst (2), Hicks, Bell, Roberts	49,384

=== FA Cup ===
Date	Round	Opponents	H / A	Venue	Result F – A	Scorers	Attendance
8 January 1927	Third round	Birmingham	A	St Andrew's	1 – 4	Hicks	39,503

== Squad statistics ==
=== Squad ===
Appearances for competitive matches only

Nat.	Player	Pos.	Premier League		FA Cup		Total	
Nat.	Player	Pos.	Apps	Goal	Apps	Goal	Apps	Goal
(Wales)	Dick Finnigan	GK	8	0	0	0	8	0
(England)	Jim Goodchild	GK	15	0	1	0	16	0
(Wales)	Bert Gray	GK	19	0	0	0	19	0
(England)	Eddie Bennett	DF	12	0	1	0	13	0
(England)	Sam Cookson	DF	42	0	1	0	43	0
(Scotland)	Philip McCloy	DF	30	0	0	0	30	0
	Robert Benzie	MF	5	0	0	0	5	0
	Baggy Coupland	MF	1	0	0	0	1	0
(England)	Sam Cowan	MF	27	2	0	0	27	2
(Republic of Ireland)	Jimmy Elwood	MF	4	0	0	0	4	0
(Scotland)	Jimmy McMullan	MF	35	3	1	0	36	3
(Scotland)	Charlie Pringle	MF	33	1	1	0	34	1
(England)	Sammy Sharp	MF	5	0	0	0	5	0
(England)	Billy Wilson	MF	2	0	0	0	2	0
	John Allan	FW	2	0	0	0	2	0
(England)	Billy Austin	FW	26	10	1	0	27	10
(England)	Matt Barrass	FW	27	7	1	0	28	7
(England)	Peter Bell	FW	26	4	0	0	26	4
(England)	Charles Broadhurst	FW	7	7	0	0	7	7
(Scotland)	Billy Cowan	FW	22	11	1	0	23	11
	Tommy Gibson	FW	2	2	0	0	2	2
(England)	George Hicks	FW	42	21	1	1	43	22
(England)	Tommy Johnson	FW	38	25	1	0	39	25
(England)	Frank Roberts	FW	27	14	0	0	27	14
(England)	Frank Thompson	FW	3	0	1	0	4	0
Own goals				1		0		1
Totals				108		1		109

=== Scorers ===
Nat.	Player	Pos.	Football League	FA Cup	TOTAL
(England)	Tommy Johnson	FW	25	0	25
(England)	George Hicks	FW	21	1	22
(England)	Frank Roberts	FW	14	0	14
(Scotland)	Billy Cowan	FW	11	0	11
(England)	Billy Austin	FW	10	0	10
(England)	Matt Barrass	FW	7	0	7
(England)	Charles Broadhurst	FW	7	0	7
(England)	Peter Bell	FW	4	0	4
(Scotland)	Jimmy McMullan	MF	3	0	3
(England)	Sam Cowan	MF	2	0	2
	Tommy Gibson	FW	2	0	2
(Scotland)	Charlie Pringle	MF	1	0	1
Own Goals			1	0	1
Totals			108	1	109

== See also ==
- Manchester City F.C. seasons
