= 1922–23 Manchester City F.C. season =

English football club season

Manchester City F.C.
1922–23 season
- Manager: Ernest Mangnall
- Football League First Division: 8th
- FA Cup: First round
- Top goalscorer: League: Horace Barnes (21); All: Horace Barnes (21)
- Highest home attendance: 35,000 v Liverpool (17 March 1923)
- Lowest home attendance: 14,000 v N. Forest (14 April 1923)
Home colours

The 1922–23 season was Manchester City F.C.'s thirty-second season of league football, and ninth consecutive season in the Football League First Division, excluding the four years during the First World War in which no competitive football was played.

The season was the last in which Manchester City would play at their Hyde Road stadium, the ground having been declared too small for the growing ambitions of the club, the move having been hastened by a devastating fire burning down the Main Stand back in November 1920. The following season the club made the transition to their new ground, Maine Road.

== Football League First Division ==
Pos	Team	Pld	W	D	L	GF	GA	GAv	Pts
6	Aston Villa	42	18	10	14	64	51	1.255	46
7	West Bromwich Albion	42	17	11	14	58	49	1.184	45
8	Manchester City	42	17	11	14	50	49	1.020	45
9	Cardiff City	42	18	7	17	73	59	1.237	43
10	Sheffield United	42	16	10	16	68	64	1.063	42

Source: World Football
Rules for classification: 1) Points; 2) Goal average; 3) Goals scored

=== Results summary ===
Overall								Home						Away					
Pld	W	D	L	GF	GA	GAv	Pts	W	D	L	GF	GA	Pts	W	D	L	GF	GA	Pts
42	17	11	14	50	49	1.02	45	14	6	1	38	16	34	3	5	13	12	33	11

Source: rsssf.com

=== Reports ===
Date	Opponents	H / A	Venue	Result F – A	Scorers	Attendance
26 August 1922	Sheffield United	A	Bramall Lane	0 – 2		25,000
28 August 1922	Middlesbrough	H	Hyde Road	2 – 1	Browell, Barnes	25,000
2 September 1922	Sheffield United	H	Hyde Road	3 – 3	Browell, Doran, Murphy	25,000
4 September 1922	Middlesbrough	A	Ayresome Park	0 – 5		15,000
9 September 1922	Birmingham	H	Hyde Road	0 – 1		22,000
16 September 1922	Birmingham	A	St Andrew's	1 – 0	Johnson	30,000
23 September 1922	Huddersfield Town	H	Hyde Road	3 – 1	Johnson (2), Barnes	28,000
30 September 1922	Huddersfield Town	A	Leeds Road	0 – 0		16,200
7 October 1922	Stoke	A	Victoria Ground	1 – 1	Johnson	21,000
14 October 1922	Stoke	H	Hyde Road	2 – 1	Johnson, Barnes	28,000
21 October 1922	Preston North End	A	Deepdale	2 – 0	Barnes (2)	12,000
28 October 1922	Preston North End	H	Hyde Road	2 – 1	Johnson, Barnes	28,000
4 November 1922	West Bromwich Albion	A	The Hawthorns	0 – 2		18,000
11 November 1922	West Bromwich Albion	H	Hyde Road	1 – 1	Johnson	25,000
18 November 1922	Bolton Wanderers	H	Hyde Road	2 – 0	Roberts, Johnson	30,000
25 November 1922	Bolton Wanderers	A	Burnden Park	1 – 2	Barnes	30,000
2 December 1922	Blackburn Rovers	A	Ewood Park	0 – 0		20,000
9 December 1922	Blackburn Rovers	H	Hyde Road	2 – 1	Barnes (2)	26,000
16 December 1922	Cardiff City	A	Ninian Park	1 – 3	Barnes	15,000
23 December 1922	Cardiff City	H	Hyde Road	5 – 1	Barnes (3), Roberts, Johnson	18,000
25 December 1922	Everton	A	Goodison Park	0 – 0		35,000
26 December 1922	Everton	H	Hyde Road	2 – 1	Roberts, Barnes	30,000
30 December 1922	Oldham Athletic	H	Hyde Road	3 – 2	Johnson (2), Roberts	20,000
6 January 1923	Oldham Athletic	A	Boundary Park	3 – 0	Barnes (2), Roberts	18,000
20 January 1923	Arsenal	A	Highbury	0 – 1		25,000
27 January 1923	Arsenal	H	Hyde Road	0 – 0		30,000
3 February 1923	Aston Villa	A	Villa Park	0 – 2		20,000
10 February 1923	Aston Villa	H	Hyde Road	1 – 1	Roberts	15,000
17 February 1923	Burnley	A	Turf Moor	0 – 2		14,000
24 February 1923	Burnley	H	Hyde Road	1 – 0	Barnes	20,000
3 March 1923	Tottenham Hotspur	A	White Hart Lane	1 – 3	Browell	35,000
14 March 1923	Tottenham Hotspur	H	Hyde Road	3 – 0	Roberts (2), Johnson	25,000
17 March 1923	Liverpool	H	Hyde Road	1 – 0	Barnes	35,000
24 March 1923	Liverpool	A	Anfield	0 – 2		25,000
30 March 1923	Sunderland	A	Roker Park	0 – 2		35,000
31 March 1923	Chelsea	H	Hyde Road	3 – 0	Johnson (2), Barnes	15,000
2 April 1923	Sunderland	H	Hyde Road	1 – 0	Barnes	32,000
7 April 1923	Chelsea	A	Stamford Bridge	1 – 1	Barnes	22,000
14 April 1923	Nottingham Forest	H	Hyde Road	1 – 1	Roberts	14,000
21 April 1923	Nottingham Forest	A	City Ground	0 – 2		12,000
28 April 1923	Newcastle United	H	Hyde Road	0 – 0		20,000
5 May 1923	Newcastle United	A	St James' Park	1 – 3	Roberts	15,000

=== FA Cup ===
Date	Round	Opponents	H / A	Venue	Result F – A	Scorers	Attendance
13 January 1923	First round	Charlton Athletic	H	Hyde Road	1 – 2	Johnson	28,445

== Squad statistics ==
=== Squad ===
Appearances for competitive matches only

Nat.	Player	Pos.	Premier League		FA Cup		Total	
Nat.	Player	Pos.	Apps	Goal	Apps	Goal	Apps	Goal
(England)	Jim Goodchild	GK	20	0	0	0	20	0
(England)	James Mitchell	GK	22	0	1	0	23	0
(England)	Sam Cookson	DF	25	0	1	0	26	0
(England)	Fred Fayers	DF	1	0	0	0	1	0
(England)	Eli Fletcher	DF	5	0	0	0	5	0
	Jimmy Mulligan	DF	1	0	0	0	1	0
(Republic of Ireland)	Mickey Hamill	MF	41	0	1	0	42	0
(England)	Spud Murphy	MF	32	1	1	0	33	1
(Scotland)	Charlie Pringle	MF	42	0	1	0	43	0
(England)	Sammy Sharp	MF	41	0	1	0	42	0
(England)	George Utley	MF	1	0	0	0	1	0
(England)	Billy Wilson	MF	12	0	1	0	13	0
(England)	Jack Allen	FW	27	0	0	0	27	0
(England)	Horace Barnes	FW	38	21	1	0	39	21
(England)	Tommy Browell	FW	15	3	0	0	15	3
	James Calderwood	FW	4	0	0	0	4	0
(England)	Arthur Daniels	FW	10	0	0	0	10	0
(Republic of Ireland)	Jack Doran	FW	3	1	0	0	3	1
(England)	Tommy Johnson	FW	35	14	1	1	36	15
(Republic of Ireland)	Paddy Kelly	FW	1	0	1	0	2	0
(Wales)	Billy Meredith	FW	1	0	0	0	1	0
	Hughbert Morris	FW	26	0	0	0	26	0
(England)	Frank Roberts	FW	32	10	1	0	33	10
(England)	Frank Thompson	FW	10	0	0	0	10	0
(England)	Jack Warner	FW	7	0	0	0	7	0
(England)	Robert Etherington	FW	10	0	0	0	10	0
Own goals				0		0		0
Totals				50		1		51

=== Scorers ===
Nat.	Player	Pos.	Football League	FA Cup	TOTAL
(England)	Horace Barnes	FW	21	0	21
(England)	Tommy Johnson	FW	14	1	15
(England)	Frank Roberts	FW	10	0	10
(England)	Tommy Browell	FW	3	0	3
(England)	Spud Murphy	MF	1	0	1
(Republic of Ireland)	Jack Doran	MF	1	0	1
Own Goals			0	0	0
Totals			50	1	51

== See also ==
- Manchester City F.C. seasons
