= 1923–24 Manchester City F.C. season =

English football club season

Manchester City F.C.
1923–24 season
- Manager: Ernest Mangnall
- Football League First Division: 11th
- FA Cup: Semi-final
- Top goalscorer: League: Horace Barnes (20); All: Horace Barnes (22)
- Highest home attendance: 76,166 v Cardiff (8 March 1924)
- Lowest home attendance: 3,000 v N. Forest (13 Feb. 1924)
Home colours

The 1923–24 season was Manchester City F.C.'s thirty-third season of league football, and tenth consecutive season in the Football League First Division, excluding the four years during the First World War in which no competitive football was played.

The season was notable for several reasons: primarily, it was the first season Manchester City spent at their Maine Road stadium, the predecessor Hyde Road having been left in the quest to meet the club's ambitions and move into a ground with a higher capacity. The season also proved to be manager Ernest Mangnall's last at the club. He was at the time the club's longest serving manager, having managed the club for 12 years and served 350 competitive games. He rounded his time at the club off with an FA Cup semi-final appearance, the first time that the club had got this far in the competition since they won it twenty years previously.

== Football League First Division ==
Pos	Team	Pld	W	D	L	GF	GA	GAv	Pts
9	Newcastle United	42	17	10	15	60	54	1.111	44
10	Notts County	42	14	14	14	44	49	0.898	42
11	Manchester City	42	15	12	15	54	71	0.761	42
12	Liverpool	42	15	11	16	49	48	1.021	41
13	West Ham United	42	13	15	14	40	43	0.930	41

Source: World Football
Rules for classification: 1) Points; 2) Goal average; 3) Goals scored

=== Results summary ===
Overall								Home						Away					
Pld	W	D	L	GF	GA	GAv	Pts	W	D	L	GF	GA	Pts	W	D	L	GF	GA	Pts
42	15	12	15	54	71	0.761	42	11	7	3	34	24	29	4	5	12	20	47	13

Source: rsssf.com

=== Reports ===
Date	Opponents	H / A	Venue	Result F – A	Scorers	Attendance
25 August 1923	Sheffield United	H	Maine Road	2 – 1	Johnson, Barnes	56,993
29 August 1923	Aston Villa	A	Villa Park	0 – 2		15,000
1 September 1923	Sheffield United	A	Bramall Lane	0 – 3		30,000
5 September 1923	Aston Villa	H	Maine Road	1 – 2	Barnes	32,038
8 September 1923	Bolton Wanderers	H	Maine Road	1 – 1	Roberts	43,601
15 September 1923	Bolton Wanderers	A	Burnden Park	0 – 0		35,000
22 September 1923	Sunderland	H	Maine Road	4 – 1	Barnes (2), Johnson, Hamill	33,952
29 September 1923	Sunderland	A	Roker Park	2 – 5	Barnes (2)	15,000
6 October 1923	Arsenal	H	Maine Road	1 – 0	Roberts	23,477
13 October 1923	Arsenal	A	Highbury	2 – 1	Barnes (2)	32,000
20 October 1923	Blackburn Rovers	A	Ewood Park	1 – 0	Barnes	30,000
27 October 1923	Blackburn Rovers	H	Maine Road	3 – 1	Roberts (2), Barnes	32,498
3 November 1923	Newcastle United	H	Maine Road	1 – 1	Barnes	27,652
10 November 1923	Newcastle United	A	St James' Park	1 – 4	Murphy	30,000
17 November 1923	Cardiff City	H	Maine Road	1 – 1	Murphy	20,200
24 November 1923	Cardiff City	A	Ninian Park	1 – 1	Roberts	30,000
1 December 1923	Notts County	H	Maine Road	1 – 0	Roberts	22,990
8 December 1923	Notts County	A	Meadow Lane	0 – 2		12,000
15 December 1923	Everton	H	Maine Road	2 – 1	Roberts, Barnes	35,000
22 December 1923	Everton	A	Goodison Park	1 – 6	Barnes	20,000
26 December 1923	Birmingham	A	St Andrew's	0 – 3		30,000
29 December 1923	West Bromwich Albion	H	Maine Road	3 – 3	Barnes (2), Roberts	20,000
1 January 1924	Tottenham Hotspur	H	Maine Road	1 – 0	Johnson	40,000
5 January 1924	West Bromwich Albion	A	The Hawthorns	1 – 2	Barnes	15,000
19 January 1924	Liverpool	H	Maine Road	0 – 1		22,000
26 January 1924	Liverpool	A	Anfield	0 – 0		25,000
9 February 1924	Nottingham Forest	A	City Ground	2 – 1	Johnson, Browell	10,000
13 February 1924	Nottingham Forest	H	Maine Road	1 – 3	Roberts	3,000
16 February 1924	Burnley	H	Maine Road	2 – 2	Roberts, Hicks	24,000
1 March 1924	Middlesbrough	H	Maine Road	3 – 2	Barnes (2), Roberts	20,000
15 March 1924	Preston North End	A	Deepdale	1 – 4	Barnes	18,000
17 March 1924	Burnley	A	Turf Moor	2 – 3	Warner, Browell	12,000
22 March 1924	Preston North End	H	Maine Road	2 – 2	Barnes, Johnson	22,000
2 April 1924	Middlesbrough	A	Ayresome Park	1 – 1	Johnson	10,000
5 April 1924	Chelsea	H	Maine Road	1 – 0	Johnson	17,000
12 April 1924	Huddersfield Town	A	Leeds Road	1 – 1	Roberts	11,000
18 April 1924	Birmingham	H	Maine Road	1 – 0	Roberts	30,000
19 April 1924	Huddersfield Town	H	Maine Road	1 – 1	Warner	35,000
21 April 1924	Tottenham Hotspur	A	White Hart Lane	1 – 4	Johnson	18,000
26 April 1924	West Ham United	A	Upton Park	2 – 1	Roberts, Browell	16,000
30 April 1924	Chelsea	A	Stamford Bridge	1 – 3	Browell	3,600
3 May 1924	West Ham United	H	Maine Road	2 – 1	Warner, Johnson	12,000

=== FA Cup ===
Date	Round	Opponents	H / A	Venue	Result F – A	Scorers	Attendance
12 January 1924	First round	Nottingham Forest	H	Maine Road	2 – 1	Roberts, Barnes	33,849
2 February 1924	Second round	Halifax Town	H	Maine Road	2 – 2	Hamill, Roberts	30,970
6 February 1924	Second round replay	Halifax Town	A	The Shay	0 – 0		21,590
11 February 1924	Second round second replay	Halifax Town	N	Old Trafford	3 – 0	Roberts (2), Browell	28,128
23 February 1924	Third round	Brighton & Hove Albion	A	Goldstone Ground	5 – 1	Browell (2), Meredith, Barnes, Sharp	24,734
8 March 1924	Fourth round	Cardiff City	H	Maine Road	0 – 0		76,166
12 March 1924	Fourth round replay	Cardiff City	A	Ninian Park	1 – 0	Browell	50,000
29 March 1924	Semi-final	Newcastle United	N	St Andrew's	0 – 2		50,039

== Squad statistics ==
=== Squad ===
Appearances for competitive matches only

Nat.	Player	Pos.	First Division		FA Cup		Total	
Nat.	Player	Pos.	Apps	Goal	Apps	Goal	Apps	Goal
(England)	Jim Goodchild	GK	7	0	0	0	7	0
(Scotland)	Bill Harper	GK	4	0	0	0	4	0
(England)	James Mitchell	GK	31	0	8	0	39	0
	Frank Carroll	DF	2	0	0	0	2	0
(England)	Sam Cookson	DF	34	0	8	0	42	0
(England)	Eli Fletcher	DF	20	0	4	0	24	0
(England)	Max Woosnam	DF	1	0	1	0	2	0
(Republic of Ireland)	Jimmy Elwood	MF	8	0	0	0	8	0
(Republic of Ireland)	Mickey Hamill	MF	25	1	7	1	32	2
	Alex Leslie	MF	1	0	0	0	1	0
(England)	Spud Murphy	MF	26	2	4	0	30	2
(Scotland)	Charlie Pringle	MF	28	0	8	0	36	0
(England)	Sammy Sharp	MF	34	0	4	1	38	1
(England)	Bob Smith	MF	6	0	0	0	6	0
(England)	Billy Wilson	MF	21	0	4	0	25	0
(England)	Jack Allen	FW	14	0	4	0	18	0
(England)	Horace Barnes	FW	23	20	7	2	30	22
(England)	Tommy Browell	FW	14	4	5	4	19	8
	James Calderwood	FW	15	0	0	0	15	0
(England)	Arthur Daniels	FW	11	0	1	0	12	0
(Scotland)	Alex Donaldson	FW	7	0	0	0	7	0
(England)	George Hicks	FW	2	1	0	0	2	1
(England)	Tommy Johnson	FW	31	9	5	0	36	9
(Wales)	Billy Meredith	FW	2	0	4	1	6	1
	Hughbert Morris	FW	31	0	4	0	35	0
(England)	Frank Roberts	FW	41	14	8	4	49	18
(England)	Frank Thompson	FW	1	0	0	0	1	0
(England)	Jack Warner	FW	23	3	2	0	25	3
Own goals				0		0		0
Totals				54		11		65

=== Scorers ===
Nat.	Player	Pos.	Football League	FA Cup	TOTAL
(England)	Horace Barnes	FW	20	2	22
(England)	Frank Roberts	FW	14	4	18
(England)	Tommy Johnson	FW	9	1	9
(England)	Tommy Browell	FW	4	4	8
(England)	Jack Warner	FW	3	0	3
(England)	Spud Murphy	MF	2	0	2
(Republic of Ireland)	Mickey Hamill	MF	1	1	2
(England)	George Hicks	FW	1	4	1
(Wales)	Billy Meredith	MF	0	1	1
(England)	Sammy Sharp	MF	0	1	1
Own Goals			0	0	0
Totals			54	11	65

== See also ==
- Manchester City F.C. seasons
