= 1921–22 Manchester City F.C. season =

English football club season

Manchester City F.C.
1921–22 season
- Manager: Ernest Mangnall
- Football League First Division: 10th
- FA Cup: Third round
- Top goalscorer: League: Tommy Browell (21); All: Tommy Browell (26)
- Highest home attendance: 35,000 v 5 teams
- Lowest home attendance: 10,000 v S'land (31 Dec. 1921)
Home colours

The 1921–22 season was Manchester City F.C.'s thirty-first season of league football, and eighth consecutive season in the Football League First Division, excluding the four years during the First World War in which no competitive football was played.

== Football League First Division ==
Pos	Team	Pld	W	D	L	GF	GA	GAv	Pts
8	Middlesbrough	42	16	14	12	79	69	1.145	46
9	Chelsea	42	17	12	13	40	43	0.930	46
10	Manchester City	42	18	9	15	65	70	0.929	45
11	Sheffield United	42	15	10	17	59	54	1.093	40
12	Sunderland	42	16	8	18	60	62	0.968	40

Source: World Football
Rules for classification: 1) Points; 2) Goal average; 3) Goals scored

=== Results summary ===
Overall								Home						Away					
Pld	W	D	L	GF	GA	GAv	Pts	W	D	L	GF	GA	Pts	W	D	L	GF	GA	Pts
42	18	9	15	65	70	0.929	45	13	7	1	44	21	33	5	2	14	21	49	12

Source: rsssf.com

=== Reports ===
Date	Opponents	H / A	Venue	Result F – A	Scorers	Attendance
27 August 1921	Aston Villa	H	Hyde Road	2 – 1	Barnes (2)	35,000
31 August 1921	Liverpool	A	Anfield	2 – 3	Barnes, Murphy	25,000
3 September 1921	Aston Villa	A	Villa Park	0 – 4		30,000
7 September 1921	Liverpool	H	Hyde Road	1 – 1	Murphy	25,000
10 September 1921	Arsenal	H	Hyde Road	2 – 0	Warner, Barnes	25,000
17 September 1921	Arsenal	A	Highbury	1 – 0	Barnes	25,000
24 September 1921	Blackburn Rovers	H	Hyde Road	1 – 1	Browell	35,000
1 October 1921	Blackburn Rovers	A	Ewood Park	1 – 3	Browell	25,000
8 October 1921	Oldham Athletic	H	Hyde Road	2 – 1	Browell, Murphy	35,000
15 October 1921	Oldham Athletic	A	Boundary Park	1 – 0	Browell	25,000
22 October 1921	Manchester United	H	Hyde Road	4 – 1	Barnes (3), Warner	20,000
29 October 1921	Manchester United	A	Old Trafford	1 – 3	Murphy	56,000
5 November 1921	Cardiff City	A	Ninian Park	2 – 0	Browell, Barnes	35,000
12 November 1921	Cardiff City	H	Hyde Road	1 – 1	Murphy	25,000
19 November 1921	West Bromwich Albion	H	Hyde Road	6 – 1	Barnes (3), Browell (2), Woosnam	25,000
26 November 1921	West Bromwich Albion	A	The Hawthorns	0 – 2		30,000
3 December 1921	Bolton Wanderers	H	Hyde Road	2 – 3	Browell, Barnes	35,000
10 December 1921	Bolton Wanderers	A	Burnden Park	0 – 5		40,000
17 December 1921	Everton	H	Hyde Road	2 – 1	Browell, Murphy	20,000
24 December 1921	Everton	A	Goodison Park	2 – 2	Johnson (2)	30,000
26 December 1921	Huddersfield Town	A	Leeds Road	0 – 2		26,000
31 December 1921	Sunderland	H	Hyde Road	3 – 0	Browell, Johnson, Murphy	10,000
2 January 1922	Huddersfield Town	H	Hyde Road	2 – 1	Johnson, Kelly	30,000
14 January 1922	Sunderland	A	Roker Park	3 – 2	Browell, Barnes, Murphy	5,000
21 January 1922	Middlesbrough	H	Hyde Road	2 – 2	Barnes, Browell	25,000
1 February 1922	Middlesbrough	A	Ayresome Park	1 – 4	Browell	20,000
4 February 1922	Tottenham Hotspur	H	Hyde Road	3 – 3	Browell, Johnson, Barnes	20,000
11 February 1922	Tottenham Hotspur	A	White Hart Lane	1 – 3	Barnes	45,000
22 February 1922	Bradford City	H	Hyde Road	3 – 2	Browell, Barnes, Woosnam	20,000
25 February 1922	Bradford City	A	Valley Parade	2 – 1	Murphy, Browell	25,000
11 March 1922	Preston North End	A	Deepdale	0 – 1		20,000
18 March 1922	Chelsea	A	Stamford Bridge	0 – 0		40,000
25 March 1922	Chelsea	H	Hyde Road	0 – 0		26,000
1 April 1922	Sheffield United	A	Bramall Lane	0 – 1		20,000
5 April 1922	Preston North End	H	Hyde Road	2 – 0	Browell, Barnes	20,000
8 April 1922	Sheffield United	H	Hyde Road	2 – 2	Browell (2)	12,000
14 April 1922	Birmingham	H	Hyde Road	1 – 0	Warner	35,000
15 April 1922	Burnley	A	Turf Moor	2 – 5	Woosnam, ? (Meredith or o.g.)	15,000
18 April 1922	Birmingham	A	St Andrew's	1 – 3	? (o.g.)	39,000
22 April 1922	Burnley	H	Hyde Road	2 – 0	Browell, Barnes	25,000
29 April 1922	Newcastle United	A	St James' Park	1 – 5	Ingham	25,000
6 May 1922	Newcastle United	H	Hyde Road	1 – 0	Browell	18,000

=== FA Cup ===
Date	Round	Opponents	H / A	Venue	Result F – A	Scorers	Attendance
7 January 1922	First round	Darlington	H	Hyde Road	3 – 1	Browell (3)	23,686
28 January 1922	Second round	Bolton Wanderers	A	Burnden Park	3 – 1	Browell (2), Kelly	66,442
18 February 1922	Third round	Tottenham Hotspur	A	White Hart Lane	1 – 2	Kelly	53,000

== Squad statistics ==
=== Squad ===
Appearances for competitive matches only

Nat.	Player	Pos.	Premier League		FA Cup		Total	
Nat.	Player	Pos.	Apps	Goal	Apps	Goal	Apps	Goal
(Scotland)	Tom Blair	GK	38	0	3	0	41	0
(England)	Jim Goodchild	GK	4	0	0	0	4	0
(England)	Jack Brennan	DF	1	0	0	0	1	0
	Frank Carroll	DF	4	0	1	0	5	0
(England)	Sam Cookson	DF	39	0	2	0	41	0
(England)	Fred Fayers	DF	32	0	3	0	35	0
(England)	Eli Fletcher	DF	38	0	3	0	41	0
	John Leyland	DF	2	0	0	0	2	0
	Jimmy Mulligan	DF	2	0	0	0	2	0
(England)	Max Woosnam	DF	33	3	3	0	36	3
(England)	George Albinson	MF	3	0	0	0	3	0
(Ireland)	Mickey Hamill	MF	24	0	2	0	26	0
(England)	Spud Murphy	MF	42	9	3	0	45	9
(England)	Sammy Sharp	MF	25	0	0	0	25	0
(England)	Billy Wilson	MF	42	9	3	0	45	9
(England)	Jack Allen	FW	2	0	0	0	2	0
(England)	Horace Barnes	FW	38	20	3	0	41	20
(England)	Tommy Browell	FW	38	21	3	5	41	26
(England)	Dick Crawshaw	FW	2	0	0	0	2	0
	Alf Ford	FW	4	0	0	0	4	0
	Tommy Ingham	FW	2	1	0	0	2	1
(England)	Tommy Johnson	FW	20	5	3	0	23	5
(Ireland)	Paddy Kelly	FW	11	1	3	2	14	3
	Fred Lievesley	FW	1	0	0	0	1	0
(Wales)	Billy Meredith	FW	25	0	0	0	25	0
	Harry Pearson	FW	1	0	0	0	1	0
	Stanley Royle	FW	1	0	0	0	1	0
	Albert Simpson	FW	1	0	0	0	1	0
(England)	Frank Thompson	FW	3	0	1	0	4	0
(England)	Jack Warner	FW	22	3	0	0	22	3
(England)	Wilf Woodcock	FW	2	0	0	0	2	0
Own goals				2		0		2
Totals				65		7		72

=== Scorers ===
==== All ====
Nat.	Player	Pos.	Football League	FA Cup	TOTAL
(England)	Tommy Browell	FW	21	5	26
(England)	Horace Barnes	FW	20	0	20
(England)	Spud Murphy	MF	9	0	9
(England)	Tommy Johnson	FW	5	0	5
(Ireland)	Paddy Kelly	MF	1	2	3
(England)	Jack Warner	FW	3	0	3
(England)	Max Woosnam	FW	3	0	3
(England)	Tommy Ingham	FW	1	0	1
Own Goals			2	0	2
Totals			65	7	72

== See also ==
- Manchester City F.C. seasons
