= 1920–21 Manchester City F.C. season =

English football club season

Manchester City F.C.
1920–21 season
- Manager: Ernest Mangnall
- Football League First Division: 2nd
- FA Cup: First round
- Top goalscorer: League: Tommy Browell (31); All: Tommy Browell (31)
- Highest home attendance: 50,155 v Burnley (26 March 1921)
- Lowest home attendance: 2,000 v Everton (23 February 1921)
Home colours

The 1920–21 season was Manchester City F.C.'s thirtieth season of league football, and seventh consecutive season in the Football League First Division, excluding the four years during the First World War in which no competitive football was played.

== Football League First Division ==
Pos	Team	Pld	W	D	L	GF	GA	GAv	Pts
1	Burnley (C)	42	23	13	6	79	36	2.194	59
2	Manchester City	42	24	6	12	70	50	1.400	54
3	Bolton Wanderers	42	19	14	9	77	53	1.453	52
4	Liverpool	42	18	15	9	63	35	1.800	51
5	Newcastle United	42	20	10	12	66	45	1.467	50

Source: World Football
Rules for classification: 1) Points; 2) Goal average; 3) Goals scored
(C) Champions

=== Results summary ===
Overall								Home						Away					
Pld	W	D	L	GF	GA	GAv	Pts	W	D	L	GF	GA	Pts	W	D	L	GF	GA	Pts
42	24	6	12	70	50	1.4	54	19	2	0	50	13	40	5	4	12	20	37	14

Source: rsssf.com

=== Reports ===
Date	Opponents	H / A	Venue	Result F – A	Scorers	Attendance
28 August 1920	Liverpool	A	Anfield	2 – 4	Goodwin, Browell	30,000
30 August 1920	Aston Villa	H	Hyde Road	3 – 1	Browell (2), Murphy	40,000
4 September 1920	Liverpool	H	Hyde Road	3 – 2	Browell (3)	30,000
6 September 1920	Aston Villa	A	Villa Park	1 – 3	Murphy	14,000
11 September 1920	Arsenal	A	Highbury	1 – 2	Browell	42,000
18 September 1920	Arsenal	H	Hyde Road	3 – 1	Browell, Barnes, Murphy	30,000
25 September 1920	Bolton Wanderers	A	Burnden Park	0 – 3		50,000
2 October 1920	Bolton Wanderers	H	Hyde Road	3 – 1	Woodcock, Fayers, Browell	40,000
9 October 1920	Derby County	A	Baseball Ground	0 – 3		20,000
16 October 1920	Derby County	H	Hyde Road	0 – 0		35,000
23 October 1920	Blackburn Rovers	A	Ewood Park	2 – 0	Woodcock, Johnson	30,000
30 October 1920	Blackburn Rovers	H	Hyde Road	0 – 0		35,000
6 November 1920	Huddersfield Town	A	Leeds Road	1 – 0	Barnes	22,000
13 November 1920	Huddersfield Town	H	Hyde Road	3 – 2	Browell (2), Fayers	30,000
20 November 1920	Manchester United	A	Old Trafford	1 – 1	Barnes	66,000
27 November 1920	Manchester United	H	Hyde Road	3 – 0	Browell, Barnes, Murphy	40,000
4 December 1920	Bradford City	A	Valley Parade	2 – 1	Murphy, Browell	20,000
11 December 1920	Bradford City	H	Hyde Road	1 – 0	Browell	30,000
18 December 1920	Sunderland	A	Roker Park	0 – 1		18,000
25 December 1920	West Bromwich Albion	H	Hyde Road	4 – 0	Browell (2), Barnes (2)	
27 December 1920	West Bromwich Albion	A	The Hawthorns	2 – 2	Browell (2)	40,000
1 January 1921	Sunderland	H	Hyde Road	3 – 1	Murphy (2), Browell	40,000
15 January 1921	Chelsea	A	Stamford Bridge	1 – 2	Murphy	35,000
22 January 1921	Chelsea	H	Hyde Road	1 – 0	Browell	30,000
5 February 1921	Everton	A	Goodison Park	0 – 3		35,000
9 February 1921	Everton	H	Hyde Road	Abandoned; 0 – 0		30,000
12 February 1921	Tottenham Hotspur	A	White Hart Lane	0 – 2		35,000
23 February 1921	Everton	H	Hyde Road	2 – 0	Browell (2)	33,000
26 February 1921	Oldham Athletic	A	Boundary Park	0 – 2		30,000
5 March 1921	Oldham Athletic	H	Hyde Road	3 – 1	Browell, Johnson, Barnes	16,000
9 March 1921	Tottenham Hotspur	H	Hyde Road	2 – 0	Browell, Barnes	35,000
12 March 1921	Preston North End	A	Deepdale	1 – 0	Fayers	18,000
25 March 1921	Middlesbrough	H	Hyde Road	2 – 1	Johnson, Barnes	30,000
26 March 1921	Burnley	H	Hyde Road	3 – 0	Barnes (2), Johnson	50,155
28 March 1921	Middlesbrough	A	Ayresome Park	1 – 3	Browell	29,000
2 April 1921	Burnley	A	Turf Moor	1 – 2	Fayers	40,000
9 April 1921	Sheffield United	H	Hyde Road	2 – 1	Browell, Johnson	20,000
16 April 1921	Sheffield United	A	Bramall Lane	1 – 1	Barnes	23,000
20 April 1921	Preston North End	H	Hyde Road	5 – 1	Browell (3), Barnes (2)	20,000
23 April 1921	Bradford Park Avenue	H	Hyde Road	1 – 0	Browell	25,000
30 April 1921	Bradford Park Avenue	A	Park Avenue	2 – 1	Fayers, Barnes	10,000
2 May 1921	Newcastle United	H	Hyde Road	3 – 1	Barnes (2), Warner	18,000
7 May 1921	Newcastle United	A	St James' Park	1 – 1	Browell	40,000

=== FA Cup ===
Date	Round	Opponents	H / A	Venue	Result F – A	Scorers	Attendance
8 January 1921	First round	Crystal Palace	A	The Nest	0 – 2		18,000

== Squad statistics ==
=== Squad ===
Appearances for competitive matches only

Pos.	Name	League		FA Cup		Total	
Pos.	Name	Apps	Goals	Apps	Goals	Apps	Goals
GK	(England) Jim Goodchild	42	0	1	0	43	0
DF	(England) Jack Brennan	42	0	1	0	43	0
DF	Frank Carroll	12	0	1	0	13	0
DF	(England) Sam Cookson	42	0	1	0	43	0
DF	Joe Edelston	6	0	0	0	6	0
DF	(England) Fred Fayers	40	5	1	0	41	5
DF	(England) Eli Fletcher	35	0	1	0	36	0
DF	George Gray	1	0	0	0	1	0
DF	Harry Jarvis	1	0	0	0	1	0
DF	John Leyland	1	0	0	0	1	0
DF	Sid Scott	2	0	0	0	2	0
DF	Herbert Tyler	3	0	1	0	4	0
DF	(England) Max Woosnam	34	0	1	0	35	0
MF	(Ireland) Mickey Hamill	28	0	0	0	28	0
MF	(England) Spud Murphy	40	8	1	0	41	8
MF	(England) Sammy Sharp	5	0	0	0	5	0
FW	(England) Jack Allen	7	0	0	0	7	0
FW	(England) Horace Barnes	41	17	1	0	42	17
FW	(England) Tommy Broad	23	0	1	0	24	0
FW	(England) Tommy Browell	42	31	1	0	43	31
FW	Joe Cartwright	2	0	0	0	2	0
FW	(England) Dick Crawshaw	2	0	0	0	2	0
FW	Ernie Goodwin	5	1	0	0	5	1
FW	(England) Tommy Johnson	12	5	0	0	12	5
FW	(Ireland) Paddy Kelly	13	0	0	0	13	0
FW	(England) Harry Taylor	2	0	0	0	2	0
FW	Jimmy Thompson	2	0	0	0	2	0
FW	(England) Jack Warner	5	1	0	0	5	1
FW	(England) Wilf Woodcock	13	2	0	0	13	2

=== Scorers ===
==== All ====
Nat.	Player	Pos.	Football League	FA Cup	TOTAL
(England)	Tommy Browell	FW	31	0	31
(England)	Horace Barnes	FW	17	0	17
(England)	Spud Murphy	MF	8	0	8
(England)	Fred Fayers	DF	5	0	5
(England)	Tommy Johnson	FW	5	0	5
(England)	Wilf Woodcock	FW	2	0	2
(England)	Jack Warner	FW	1	0	1
	Ernie Goodwin	FW	1	0	1
Own Goals			0	0	0
Totals			70	0	70

== See also ==
- Manchester City F.C. seasons
