= Barrass =

Barrass is a surname. Notable people with the surname include:

- Alexander Barrass, 19th-century English poet and songwriter
- Malcolm Barrass, English football player born in 1924, son of Matt Barrass (born 1899) and grandfather of Matt Barrass (born 1980)
- Matt Barrass (footballer, born 1980), English football player born in 1980 and great-grandson of Matt Barrass (born 1899)
- Matt Barrass (footballer, born 1899), English football player born in 1899
- Natalie Barrass, presenter on the former BBC children's radio programme The Big Toe Radio Show
- Tom Barrass, Australian rules footballer

== See also ==
- Henry Barrass Stadium, a small stadium in Jubilee Park, Edmonton, Enfield, London
- Barras (disambiguation)
- Baras (disambiguation)
