= Matthew Barrass =

Matthew or Matt Barrass may refer to:

- Matt Barrass (footballer, born 1899) (1899–1953), English footballer
- Matt Barrass (footballer, born 1980), English footballer
