= Etherington =

Etherington is a surname. Notable people with the surname include:

- Etherington (cricketer), 19th-century English cricketer
- Craig Etherington, (born 1979), English footballer
- Gary Etherington (born 1958), former English-American soccer player
- Harold Etherington (1900–1994), British-born American nuclear engineer, former member of National Academy of Engineering
- Ivor Malcolm Haddon Etherington (1908–1994) British mathematician and geneticist
- Jade Etherington (born 1991), British Paralympic skier
- Juliet Etherington (born 1979), New Zealand shooting competitor
- Matthew Etherington (born 1981), English footballer
- Meredith Etherington-Smith (1946–2020), British art and fashion journalist
- Robert Etherington (1899–1981), English footballer
- Bill Etherington (born 1941), British politician

== See also ==
- Wedderburn–Etherington number, an integer sequence
- Mount Etherington, a mountain in Western Canada
