= James McCourt =

James McCourt may refer to:

- James McCourt (American football), American football placekicker
- James McCourt (writer)
- James McCourt (TV host)
- James McCourt (footballer), Scottish footballer
- James Henry McCourt, politician
- Jim McCourt, boxer
