= John Smith (footballer, born 1898) =

Scottish footballer

John Smith (born 1898) was a Scottish footballer, who played for Ayr United, Middlesbrough, Cardiff City, Distillery and Scotland; in his sole international appearance in 1924, he was alongside Ayr United teammate Philip McCloy in the Scottish defence against England at Wembley, the match ending in a draw.
