= Barras =

Barras may refer to:

== Places ==
- Barras, Cumbria, England
- Barras, Alpes-de-Haute-Provence, France
- Barras, Piauí, Brazil
- Duas Barras, Rio de Janeiro, Brazil
- Sete Barras, São Paulo, Brazil

== Other uses ==
- Barras (surname)
- Barras (market), a street and indoor weekend market in Glasgow, Scotland
- Barrowland Ballroom, an entertainment venue adjacent to the Barras market
- Barras (people), the inhabitants of Ovifat, Waimes, Liège, Belgium
- Barras Futebol Club, a Brazilian football club
- Operation Barras, a British army hostage rescue in Sierra Leone

== See also ==
- Baras (disambiguation)
- Barrass
- Banderas
