= Joe Cartwright (footballer) =

English footballer (1888–1955)

Personal information
- Full name: Joseph Earnest Cartwright
- Date of birth: 11 December 1888
- Place of birth: Lower Walton, England
- Date of death: 1955 (aged 66–67)
- Position: Outside left

Senior career*
Years	Team	Apps	(Gls)
- Northwich Victoria
1913–1921	Manchester City	38	(4)
1919	→ Leeds City (guest)	4	(0)
1921–1922	Crystal Palace	19	(4)
- Llanelly
- * Club domestic league appearances and goals

Joseph Earnest Cartwright (11 December 1888 – 1955) was an English professional footballer who played as an outside left in the Football League for Manchester City and Crystal Palace.

== Personal life ==
Carney served as an ordinary seaman in the Royal Naval Volunteer Reserve during the First World War.

== Career statistics ==
Appearances and goals by club, season and competition
Club	Season	League			FA Cup		Total	
Club	Season	Division	Apps	Goals	Apps	Goals	Apps	Goals
Manchester City	1913–14	First Division	9	0	5	1	14	1
Manchester City	1914–15	First Division	21	3	4	0	25	3
Manchester City	1919–20	First Division	6	1	0	0	6	1
Manchester City	1920–21	First Division	2	0	0	0	2	0
Manchester City	Total		38	4	9	1	47	5
Crystal Palace	1921–22	Second Division	19	4	2	0	21	4
Career Total			57	8	11	1	68	9
