= Jack Allen (footballer, born 1891) =

English footballer

Personal information
- Full name: Albert John Allen
- Date of birth: 16 October 1891
- Place of birth: Moston, England
- Date of death: 23 October 1971 (aged 80)
- Place of death: Crumpsall, England
- Height: 5 ft 9 1/2 in (1.77 m)
- Position: Full back

Senior career*
Years	Team	Apps	(Gls)
1909–1910	Higher Blackley		
1910–1912	Barrowfields		
1912–1914	Hurst		
1914–1915	Glossop	23	(0)
1915–1924	Manchester City	52	(0)
1924–1925	Southport	36	(0)
1925–1926	Crewe Alexandra	30	(0)
1926–1927	Southport	35	(0)
1927–1929	Lancaster Town		
- * Club domestic league appearances and goals

Albert John Allen (16 October 1891 – 23 October 1971) was an English professional footballer who played in the Football League for Glossop, Manchester City, Southport and Crewe Alexandra as a full back.

== Personal life ==
Allen served in Italy as a lieutenant in the British Armed Forces during the First World War. After retiring from football, he worked for the Royal London Mutual Insurance Society.

== Career statistics ==
Appearances and goals by club, season and competition
Club	Season	League			FA Cup		Other		Total	
Club	Season	Division	Apps	Goals	Apps	Goals	Apps	Goals	Apps	Goals
Glossop	1914–15	Second Division	23	0	1	0	―		24	0
Manchester City	1919–20	First Division	2	0	0	0	―		2	0
Manchester City	1920–21	First Division	7	0	0	0	―		7	0
Manchester City	1921–22	First Division	2	0	0	0	―		2	0
Manchester City	1922–23	First Division	27	0	0	0	―		27	0
Manchester City	1923–24	First Division	14	0	4	0	―		18	0
Manchester City	Total		52	0	4	0	―		56	0
Southport	1924–25	Third Division North	36	0	0	0	2 (Note: Appearances in Lancashire Senior Cup)	0	38	0
Southport	1926–27	Third Division North	35	0	5	0	2	0	42	0
Southport	Total		71	0	5	0	4	0	80	0
Career total			146	0	10	0	4	0	160	0

== Honours ==
Manchester City

- Lancashire Senior Cup: 1920–21
