= Alex Donaldson =

Scottish footballer (1890–1972)

Personal information
- Full name: Alexander Pollock Donaldson
- Date of birth: 4 December 1890
- Place of birth: Barrhead, Scotland
- Date of death: 1972 (aged 81–82)
- Place of death: Bolton, England
- Height: 5 ft 7 3/4 in (1.72 m)
- Position: Outside forward

Youth career
- Belgrave Primitive Methodists

Senior career*
Years	Team	Apps	(Gls)
- Belgrave
- Balmoral United
- Ripley Athletic
1912–1921	Bolton Wanderers	139	(5)
1921–1923	Sunderland	43	(1)
1923–1924	Manchester City	7	(0)
- Chorley
- Ashton National
- Chorley
Total		146+	(5+)

International career
1914–1922	Scotland	6	(1)
1919	→ Scotland (wartime)	3	(0)
- * Club domestic league appearances and goals

Alexander Pollock Donaldson (4 December 1890 – 1972) was a Scottish footballer, who played for numerous teams in England as well as the Scotland national team. An outside-forward, he stayed with Bolton Wanderers from 1912 to 1921, and also spent time with Sunderland, Manchester City, Chorley, and Ashton National. After his football career ended, he opened a sports shop in Gorton, Manchester.

== Club career ==
Donaldson played for minor teams Belgrave (Leicester), Balmoral United and Ripley Athletic (Derbyshire) before being given his big chance with a trial at Sheffield United which was not a success. However, in 1912 he was signed by Bolton Wanderers from Ripley Athletic and made his debut against Chelsea on 7 September 1912. The Trotters finished the 1912–13 season in eighth place in the First Division. Wanderers finished in sixth position in 1913–14 and ended the 1914–15 campaign in 17th place. The Football League was suspended during World War I. Donaldson guested for Leicester Fosse and Port Vale. He returned to Burnden Park after the war, helping the club to sixth and third-place finishes in 1919–20 and 1920–21. He made 139 league and seven FA Cup appearances for Bolton, scoring six goals. He then signed with Manchester City via Sunderland. He played seven First Division games for the Citizens in 1923–24. After leaving Maine Road, he played non-League football for Chorley and Ashton National.

== International career ==
Donaldson very nearly played for England before being capped by Scotland. While heading for an English international trial match in Sunderland on 21 January 1914, Donaldson revealed that he was born in Scotland, having moved to Central England in his teens after the death of his father.

He earned his first Scotland cap against Wales on 28 February 1914, in a goalless draw at Celtic Park. On 14 March, he played in a 1–1 draw with Ireland at Windsor Park. On 4 April, he played in a 3–1 victory over England at Hampden Park; the game secured Scotland a second-place finish in the 1914 British Home Championship. No official matches occurred for six years because of World War I. However, Donaldson did take part in three unofficial wartime internationals. He returned to international football in the 1920 British Home Championship, playing in the 3–0 home victory over Ireland on 13 March. On 10 April, he scored in a 5–4 defeat to England at Hillsborough. He won his sixth and final cap on 4 March 1922, in a 2–1 home win over Ireland.

== Career statistics ==
=== Club statistics ===
Appearances and goals by club, season and competition
Club	Season	League			FA Cup		Total	
Club	Season	Division	Apps	Goals	Apps	Goals	Apps	Goals
Bolton Wanderers	1912–13	First Division	27	3	0	0	27	3
Bolton Wanderers	1913–14	First Division	33	2	3	1	36	3
Bolton Wanderers	1914–15	First Division	15	0	0	0	15	0
Bolton Wanderers	1919–20	First Division	30	0	1	0	31	0
Bolton Wanderers	1920–21	First Division	26	0	1	0	27	0
Bolton Wanderers	1921–22	First Division	8	0	2	0	10	0
Bolton Wanderers	Total		139	5	7	1	146	6
Sunderland	1921–22	First Division	8	0	0	0	8	0
Sunderland	1922–23	First Division	35	1	2	0	37	1
Sunderland	Total		43	1	2	0	45	1
Manchester City	1923–24	First Division	7	0	0	0	7	0

=== International statistics ===
Scotland national team
Year	Apps	Goals
1914	3	0
1920	2	0
1922	1	0
Total	6	0

== Honours ==
Scotland

- British Home Championship: 1922
