= Baras =

Baras may refer to:

== Places ==
- Baras Church
- Baras, Catanduanes, a municipality in the Philippines
- Baras, Indonesia, a subdistrict in Pasangkayu Regency, West Sulawesi
- Baras, Raebareli, a village in Uttar Pradesh, India
- Baras, Rizal, a municipality in the Philippines
- Baras (Sophene), a town of ancient Sophene, in Mesopotamia

== Surname ==
- Bernardo Baras, Argentine actor
- Jan Baraś-Komski, or Jan Komski, Polish painter
- John Baras, Greek-American electrical engineer and mathematician
- Joseph Baras, Belgian sports shooter
- Mohammad Nasim Baras, Afghan cricketer
- Paul Baras (1870–1941), French cyclist and racing driver
- Sara Baras, Spanish flamenco dancer and choreographer

== Other ==
- Baras language
- Baras (TV series) a Lithuanian reality television program, based on The Bar Swedish reality competition television franchise
- Baras (film), a documentary about the avant-garde Lithuanian actor and filmmaker Artūras Barysas "Baras"

== See also ==
- Barras (disambiguation)
- Varsha (disambiguation)
- Barrass
