= Jimmy McMullan =

Scottish footballer and manager

Personal information
- Date of birth: 26 March 1895
- Place of birth: Denny, Stirlingshire, Scotland
- Date of death: 28 November 1964 (aged 69)
- Place of death: Sheffield, England
- Position: Left half

Senior career*
Years	Team	Apps	(Gls)
- Denny Hibernian
1912–1913	Third Lanark		
1913–1921	Partick Thistle	217	(8)
1921–1923	Maidstone United		
1923–1926	Partick Thistle	78	(3)
1926–1933	Manchester City	220	(10)
1933–1934	Oldham Athletic		

International career
1918	England (wartime)	1	(0)
1919	Scotland (wartime)	4	(0)
1919–1921	Scottish League XI	4	(0)
1920–1929	Scotland	16	(0)

Managerial career
- 1921–1923: Maidstone United
- 1933–1934: Oldham Athletic
- 1934–1936: Aston Villa
- 1936–1937: Notts County
- 1937–1942: Sheffield Wednesday
- * Club domestic league appearances and goals

James McMullan (26 March 1895 – 28 November 1964) was a Scottish football player and manager. He won 16 Scotland caps as a player at half-back and was part of the famous "Wembley Wizards" side of 1928.

== Playing career ==
=== Early life and Third Lanark ===
McMullan was born in Denny, Stirlingshire in 1895. He began his football career with junior side Denny Hibernian in 1911 before graduating to the Scottish League with Third Lanark the next year. Initially considered an inside left, by the time he left in 1913 he was playing predominantly as a left half.

=== Partick Thistle and Maidstone United ===
He joined Thirds' Glasgow rivals Partick Thistle in 1913. He stayed eight seasons with Thistle but missed out on participating in their Scottish Cup-winning side of 1921 through injury.

In the close season of 1921 McMullan became embroiled in controversy. Partick turned down a £5,000 offer from Newcastle United for his signature and the player, determined to play in English football, signed for non-league Maidstone United as player-manager. He returned to the Glasgow club in the summer of 1923. In February 1926 he eventually earned his long-desired move to the Football League aged 30, when Manchester City signed him for £4,700.

=== Manchester City ===
McMullan made his debut for his new team in a 1–1 draw with Liverpool on 27 February 1926. Tommy Browell scored the goal for City in that game. Despite containing a number of England players such as Frank Roberts, Billy Austin, Sam Cowan and Tommy Johnson, City finished in twenty-first place in the First Division that season and were relegated into the second division. McMullan played in the 1926 FA Cup Final defeat to Bolton Wanderers. McMullan scored his first goal for Manchester City in a 3–4 defeat to Southampton in the 1926–27 football season. City came third in the second division and were unable to earn promotion. In the 1927–28 football season McMullan helped City into first place in the second division, earning the team promotion. The team had been strengthened by the acquisition of both Eric Brook and Fred Tilson from Barnsley.

McMullan reached an FA Cup final with City again in 1933 but the team were defeated by Everton 3–0. Many of his teammates would be part of the City team which won the FA Cup the following year. However, after 242 League and Cup appearances, McMullan departed Manchester City in May 1933.

=== International ===
In 1920 he won the first of his sixteen caps for Scotland against Wales in a 1–1 draw in the 1920 British Home Championship, having made unofficial appearances in the years prior during wartime. McMullan is considered to have been the greatest Scottish half-back of his day; he was an ever-present in the 1921 British Home Championship which was won by Scotland.

McMullan helped Scotland to victory in the 1925 British Home Championship and was part of the Scotland team which defeated England 2–0. He was also part of the team which won the 1926 British Home Championship appearing in the 1–0 victory against England at Old Trafford and in the 3–0 victory against Wales at Ninian Park. In the 1927 British Home Championship, McMullan featured twice for Scotland in a 3–0 victory against Wales and a 2–1 defeat to England at Hampden Park. Despite this defeat, Scotland won the championship again that season.

In the 1928 British Home Championship, McMullan captained Scotland as they defeated England 5–1 at Wembley Stadium with a hat-trick from Alex Jackson and a brace from Alex James. As a result of the resounding victory, the Scotland team were dubbed the "Wembley Wizards". Despite this victory Wales won the championship that season. McMullan captained Scotland to victory the following season in the 1929 British Home Championship.

== Managerial career ==
McMullan joined Oldham Athletic as a player-manager in 1933.

After a brief spell there, he was appointed the first-ever manager of Aston Villa in 1934 (before his appointment, the team was selected by a committee). However, the move proved disastrous, resulting in Villa's first ever relegation in 1935–36 after 61 years in the top flight.

McMullan later managed Notts County (1936–37) and Sheffield Wednesday (1937–1939). He died on 28 November 1964 in Sheffield (the same day as another former Sheffield Wednesday manager, Billy Walker).

== Legacy ==
McMullan is regarded as one of Manchester City's best ever players. In 1977, Manchester City Council named eleven streets in a new estate in Moss Side after famous City players including McMullan, Frank Swift, Fred Tilson, Sam Cowan, Horace Barnes, Max Woosnam, Tommy Browell, Eric Brook, Sam Cookson, Billy Meredith and Tommy Johnson.

== Honours ==
Manchester City

- FA Cup runner-up: 1925–26,1932–33

== See also ==
- List of Scotland national football team captains
- List of Scotland wartime international footballers
