= Alexander Barrass =

Alexander Barrass (c.1856 – 1929) was a 19th-century County Durham born poet and songwriter

== Life ==
Alexander Barrass was born near Blackhall Mill, between Consett and Stanley in County Durham in 1856, and like many youngsters in North East England, started work in the mining industry, in his case at the age of 9 years old.
He was an educated man, and bearing in mind his circumstances, possibly self-educated. There is a story, although unsubstantiated, that he went into journalism,
His first published works were in a volume "The Derwent Valley and other poems" which included songs and poetry. He also wrote a column in the Newcastle Chronicle.
His main works were in the form of a play/musical offering called "The Pitman's Social Neet" which told a story in song of a night out, and written in a fine dialect style.
His promising career was cut short when he suffered some kind of mental breakdown c1894 and was subsequently admitted to Sedgefield Asylum for 35 years where he remained for almost 35 years until his death in 1929.

== The Pitman's social neet ==
Is a volume of over eighty pages printed in 1897 by J Dent at the Derwent Press, Victoria Street, Consett.
The play looks back at the harsh and sometimes primitive conditions endured by the manual workers, particularly in the mining industry in the 19th century. It is set in a public house in Stanley where every part is that of someone either working in or connected with the local pit.

The contents of the volume are as follows :-
Page 1 Front cover
Page 2 inner cover with photograph of the author
Page 3 Prelude - Setting the scene and introducing the landlord and the first singer, Marshall.
Page 5 Song "Yor turn’ll surely come" – moralising about belief in the future
Page 7 Interlude - a link to the next song, which whilst retaining the social framework of the works, encourages the audience to "visit the bar"
Page 9 Song "Geordie's reminiscences" - reflecting on a lifetime in mining
Page 15 Interlude – linking Turner to Fat Sarah Johnson
Page 16 Song "Sarah" – An overprotective mother and her daughter's successful marriage.
Page 18 Interlude – Sarah departs and the next singer arrives
Page 20 Song "The Driver" – The early years of pitmen, from trapdoor to pony work
Page 22 Interlude – another change in the cast
Page 23 Song "The Pitman’s Dream" - At the end of a week of night-shift, Geordie goes to bed and dreams he is killed by a roof collapses at the pit. He is woken by a friend who tells him of his winning bet on the dogs. They both celebrate over a drink or two
Page 29 Prelude - a link explaining that all pitmen dream and introducing the next singer as Geordie Glen
Page 31 Song "The Church wi' the lantern toor" – about St. Nicholas Cathedral in Newcastle City Centre
Page 34 Interlude – commenting on the genuine feeling of the last singer and introducing Graham, the putter
Page 35 Song "The Putter" – Often a young lad whose job it was to push the (often too heavily) loaded wagons from the face to the shaft - one of the harshest jobs in the pit
Page 38 Interlude – linking the pusher to the hewer
Page 39 Song "The Hewer" – The miner who worked at the face, hewing coal, and then loading it. Another dirty, dangerous and extremely physically demanding job
Page 42 Interlude - linking Nat the hewer and Nancy
Page 44 Song "The set rider" – the miner responsible for the smooth flow of tubs from the face to the shaft. This job explained by Nancy, the girlfriend of Bobbie, the set rider, as is her love for him.
Page 47 Interlude – after Nancy’s tales of love, poor Bobbie is embarrassed – the next singer is introduced as Jack Spring, an old hand and past his prime.
Page 49 Song "Aw'm a poor aud shifter noo" - describing the many tasks involved in the running of a pit.
Page 52 Interlude – The old hand is gently escorted from the stage by the young putter.
Page 54 Song "The Deppity" – Described as "Big, bluff an’ blusterin’ Burdis Clark"
Page 57 Interlude -
Page 59 Song "When Geordie, thoo an' aw wiz young" - Two pitmen reminisce about their younger days.
Page 61 Conclusion – With the social event concluded the words show the drinkers returning home, with much to think about and to discuss.

Note – Each of the two preludes, the conclusion and all of the interlude includes a song (or recitation in verse) of sometimes two verses, sometimes many more, setting the scene for the next act.

== See also ==
- Geordie dialect words
