= Frank Roberts (footballer, born 1893) =

English footballer (1893–1961)

Personal information
- Full name: Frank Roberts
- Date of birth: 3 April 1893
- Place of birth: Sandbach, England
- Date of death: 23 May 1961 (aged 68)
- Height: 5 ft 7 3/4 in (1.72 m)
- Position: Inside forward

Senior career*
Years	Team	Apps	(Gls)
- Sandbach Villa
- Sandbach Ramblers
- Crewe Alexandra
1914–1922	Bolton Wanderers	157	(79)
1916–1917	→ Brentford (guest)	10	(0)
1917–1918	→ West Ham United (guest)	13	(4)
1918–1919	→ West Ham United (guest)	6	(4)
1922–1928	Manchester City	216	(116)
- Manchester Central
- Horwich RMI
Total		373	(195)

International career
1924–1925	England	4	(2)
1925	Football League XI	1	(2)
- * Club domestic league appearances and goals

Frank Roberts (3 April 1893 – 23 May 1961) was an English professional footballer who played for Manchester City between 1922 and 1928. He could play either as an inside forward or a centre forward.

== Early life ==
Roberts was born in Sandbach and began his football career playing for Sandbach Villa and Sandbach Ramblers.

== Career ==
He was transferred to Crewe Alexandra and in 1914 Bolton Wanderers paid £200 for his services. Roberts guested for West Ham United during World War I, scoring 18 goals in 19 appearances between 1917 and 1919. He also guested for Brentford. Roberts was suspended and transfer-listed by Bolton during the 1922–23 season 'for taking over one of the principal hotels in that town'. He scored 80 goals in 168 appearances for the club.

In October 1922, Manchester City paid £3,400 for him (a huge sum at the time). He scored his first goal for City in a 2–0 victory over his former team Bolton Wanderers. He scored 10 goals in his first season with the team and was City's third highest goalscorer behind Horace Barnes who scored 21 and Tommy Johnson who scored 15. In the 1923–24 season Roberts scored 14 league goals and 4 goals in the FA Cup including a brace against Halifax Town in a second-round replay. City reached the semi-final of that year's competition but were defeated 2–0 by Newcastle United. In the 1924–25 season he scored 31 league goals, making him the First Division's top scorer. Roberts' goalscoring exploits earned him a call up to the England team. Roberts made his début for England in a 4–0 victory over Belgium in December 1924 with braces from Joe Bradford and Billy Walker securing England victory. Roberts earned four caps in total for his national team.

In the 1925 British Home Championship Roberts scored twice in a 2–1 victory against Wales. Fred Keenor scored the goal for Wales. Roberts also played in England's 2–0 defeat to Scotland which secured the latter the championship that year. Hughie Gallacher scored both goals for Scotland. Roberts won his last cap for England in a 3–2 victory over France in May 1925. The French player, Philippe Bonnardel scored an own goal in this game while Vivian Gibbins and Arthur Dorrell scored the other goals for England. He also made an appearance for the Football League XI in March 1925 and scored two goals in a 4–3 victory over the Scottish League XI.

In the 1925–26 season Roberts scored 9 goals in the FA Cup and Manchester City reached the final of that year's competition. In round 5 of the FA Cup in 1925–26 he scored 5 goals as Manchester City demolished Crystal Palace 11–4. Roberts' former team, Bolton Wanderers, defeated City 1–0 in the final with David Jack scoring the only goal. Roberts was City's top scorer in the league that season with 21 goals. Two of these goals came in a record 6–1 victory against Manchester United at Old Trafford. Despite this victory and the acquisition of Jimmy McMullan from Partick Thistle, City came 21st in the league and were relegated to the Second Division.

In the 1926–27 season Roberts scored 14 goals and City came third in the Second Division behind Middlesbrough and Portsmouth. In the 1927–28 season Roberts was City's top scorer with 20 goals as the team came first in the Second Division earning them promotion into the First Division. The team were aided in their endeavour for promotion by the acquisition of Eric Brook and Fred Tilson from Barnsley.

In the 1928–29 season City finished eighth in the First Division, seven points behind champions Sheffield Wednesday. Roberts made only 14 league appearances that season and scored 6 goals. In the same season, his teammate Tommy Johnson scored 38 league goals for the team which is a club record. The season was to be Roberts' last with Manchester City. In total he made 237 appearances for City and scored 130 goals. He ended his career playing for Manchester Central and Horwich RMI.

== Legacy ==
Roberts is listed as the sixteenth greatest ever City player in Ian Penney's book The Essential History of Manchester City.

== International goals ==
Date	Venue	Opponent	Result	Competition	Scored
28 February 1925	Vetch Field, Swansea	Wales	2–1	British Home Championship	2

== Honours ==
Manchester City

- FA Cup runner-up: 1925–26
