= Bob Dennison (footballer, born 1900) =

English footballer

Personal information
- Full name: Robert Dennison
- Date of birth: 6 October 1900
- Place of birth: Arnold, England
- Date of death: 24 June 1973 (aged 72)
- Place of death: Norwich, England
- Position: Inside forward

Senior career*
Years	Team	Apps	(Gls)
1919–1920	Arnold St Mary's		
1920–1924	Norwich City	117	(34)
1924–1925	Brighton & Hove Albion	25	(10)
1925–1926	Manchester City	8	(4)
1926–1929	Clapton Orient	70	(28)
1929–1930	Chesterfield	28	(7)
1930–193?	Great Yarmouth Town		
- * Club domestic league appearances and goals

Robert Dennison (6 October 1900 – 24 June 1973) was an English professional footballer who played as an inside forward in the Football League for Norwich City, Brighton & Hove Albion, Manchester City, Clapton Orient and Chesterfield.

== Life and career ==
Dennison was born in Arnold, Nottinghamshire, in 1900. He began his football career with his local club, Arnold St Mary's, before signing for Norwich City in 1920 ahead of their first season in the newly formed Football League Third Division. He made his debut on 11 September, in a 1–0 defeat at home to Crystal Palace, and went on to score 34 goals from 117 league appearances over four seasons. In 1924, he moved on to another third-tier club, Brighton & Hove Albion. He scored 13 goals in his first 19 appearances in all competitions, but then lost form and lost his place to new signing Sam Jennings. At the end of the season, he joined Manchester City on a free transfer.

Described as "one of several useful reserves registered with City in the mid-1920s", Dennison made his debut in November 1924, scored in each of his next three appearances, against Aston Villa, Leicester City and Leeds United, and finished the season with four goals from eight First Division matches. He spent three seasons in the Second Division with Clapton Orient, for whom he scored 28 goals from 70 league appearances, and finished his Football League career with a season in the Third Division North with Chesterfield. He then spent several years in non-league football with Great Yarmouth Town. Dennison died in Norwich in 1973 at the age of 72.
