= Lewis Barber =

English footballer

Personal information
- Full name: Lewis Frederick Barber
- Date of birth: 11 April 1906
- Place of birth: Darfield, South Yorkshire, England
- Date of death: 1983 (aged 76–77)
- Position: Goalkeeper

Senior career*
Years	Team	Apps	(Gls)
1924–1925	Broomhill WMC		
1925–1927	Halifax Town	35	(0)
1927–1931	Manchester City	92	(0)
Total		127	(0)
- * Club domestic league appearances and goals

Lewis Frederick Barber (11 April 1906 – 1983) was an English footballer who played in the Football League for Halifax Town and Manchester City. Wife: Violet Barber nee Mitchell

Children: Renee, Douglas, Mary, Shirley, Malcolm

Barber's first club was Wombwell F.C., but they did not retain his services for long. He then went on a month's trial at Halifax Town, and gained a permanent contract.

He joined Manchester City, then of the Second Division, in 1927, as understudy to Welsh international Bert Gray. In total he made 99 appearances between 1927 and 1930.

The Mexborough and Swinton Times praised his anticipation and ability to punch the ball clear., and described him as "tall, athletic, strong, and in perfect trim", noting that he was "a non-smoker and abstainer".
