= Bill Harper (footballer, born 1900) =

Scottish footballer

Personal information
- Full name: William George Harper
- Date of birth: 15 November 1900
- Place of birth: Bothwell, Scotland
- Height: 5 ft 10 in (1.78 m)
- Position: Goalkeeper

Senior career*
Years	Team	Apps	(Gls)
1920–1921	Wishaw		
1921–1923	Sunderland	28	(0)
1923–1924	Manchester City	4	(0)
1924–1926	Crystal Palace	57	(0)
1926–1927	Luton Town	31	(0)
1927–1928	Weymouth		
1928–19??	Callender Athletic		
- * Club domestic league appearances and goals

William George Harper (born 15 November 1900) was a Scottish professional footballer who played as a goalkeeper for Sunderland.
