= Malcolm Barrass =

English footballer (1924–2013)

Personal information
- Full name: Malcolm Williamson Barrass
- Date of birth: 15 December 1924
- Place of birth: Blackpool, Lancashire, England
- Date of death: 4 August 2013 (aged 88)
- Place of death: Tottington, Greater Manchester, England
- Positions: Midfielder; defender

Senior career*
Years	Team	Apps	(Gls)
1944–1956	Bolton Wanderers	291	(25)
1956–1958	Sheffield United	18	(0)
1958–1959	Wigan Athletic	20	(5)
- Nuneaton Borough
- Pwllheli
Total		329	(30)

International career
1951–1953	England	3	(0)

Managerial career
- 1958–1959: Wigan Athletic (player/manager)
- * Club domestic league appearances and goals

Malcolm Williamson Barrass (15 December 1924 – 4 August 2013) was an English professional footballer.

His father, Matthew, was also a professional footballer. Malcolm W. Barrass was born in Blackpool during his father's spell with the town's club. Malcolm's grandson - also named Matt (born 1980) - was also a professional player.

== Career ==
Barrass started his professional career with Bolton Wanderers in 1944. He won his first England cap on 20 October 1951 when England fought out a 1–1 draw against Wales. His career included an appearance in the now-legendary "Matthews FA Cup Final".

He became Wigan Athletic's player-manager on 1 August 1958, replacing Trevor Hitchen. He made 20 Lancashire Combination League appearances for the Latics and scored five league goals before resigning on New Year's Day 1959. Jimmy Shirley took over the managerial reins. By 1963 Barrass was trainer at Hyde United.

== Personal life ==
Barrass married his wife, Joyce, on 7 June 1947. The couple had two children, Lynne and Robert, and celebrated their diamond anniversary in 2007.

On 5 August 2013, Bolton Wanderers confirmed that Barrass had died at the age of 88.

== Honours ==
Bolton Wanderers

- FA Cup runner-up: 1952–53
