= George Albinson =

English footballer

George Albinson (14 February 1897 – April 1975) was an English footballer. His regular position was at wing half. He was born in Prestwich, Lancashire. He played for Manchester United and Manchester City.
