= Robert Etherington =

English footballer

Personal information
- Full name: Robert Dilworth Etherington
- Date of birth: 19 June 1899
- Place of birth: Croston, England
- Date of death: 1981 (aged 81–82)
- Height: 5 ft 9 in (1.75 m)
- Position: Winger

Senior career*
Years	Team	Apps	(Gls)
- Leyland
1921–1923	Manchester City	12	(0)
1924–1925	Rotherham United	14	(1)
- * Club domestic league appearances and goals

Robert Dilworth Etherington (19 June 1899 – 1981) was an English footballer who played in the Football League for Manchester City and Rotherham United.

He also played for Halifax Town, Hurst, Mexborough Athletic, Manchester North End and Chester City, and was signed by Mossley from Crexe Alexandra in the 1928–29 season, where he made two appearances.
