= Matt Barrass (footballer, born 1980) =

English footballer

Personal information
- Full name: Matthew Robert Barrass
- Date of birth: 28 February 1980 (age 46)
- Place of birth: Bury, England
- Height: 5 ft 11 in (1.80 m)
- Position: Right back

Team information
- Current team: Bolton Wanderers (head physiotherapist)

Youth career
- 1994–1995: Manchester United
- 1995–1996: San Diego Nomads
- 1996–1997: Bury

Senior career*
Years	Team	Apps	(Gls)
1997–2005	Bury	84	(2)
2005–2006	Radcliffe Borough	12	(0)
- * Club domestic league appearances and goals

Matthew Robert Barrass (born 28 February 1980) is an English retired professional footballer, currently the head physiotherapist at Bolton Wanderers.

== Career ==
Barrass was born in Bury.

After beginning as an apprentice at Manchester United, Barrass moved to the United States to play for the San Diego Nomads. He returned to England to sign with Bury in 1996, making his professional debut in 1997 in the League Cup. Barrass made his league debut in 1999, and made a total of 84 league appearances for the side. Barrass's time at Bury was plagued by injuries, especially to his knee.

Barrass left the club in 2005, signing for Radcliffe Borough. At the time, he was Bury's longest-serving player.

After ending his playing days, he graduated from the University of Salford in 2009 with a degree in physiotherapy. He took up a new post as youth team physiotherapist at Preston North End. In July 2012, he became the physiotherapist for Bradford City.

After four years at Valley Parade, he left Bradford to become the head physiotherapist at Bolton Wanderers on 1 July 2016.

== Personal life ==
Barrass is a grandson of former player Malcolm Barrass (a Wanderers stalwart of the 1940s and 1950s who played for the club in the 1953 FA Cup Final) and a great-grandson of his namesake, Matthew Barrass.
