= James McCourt (footballer) =

Scottish footballer (1896–??)

Personal information
- Full name: James McCourt
- Date of birth: 8 September 1896
- Place of birth: Bellshill, Scotland
- Position: Half-back

Senior career*
Years	Team	Apps	(Gls)
1912–1913	St Paul's Juniors		
1913–1914	Bedlay Juniors		
1914–1915	Mossend Hibernian		
1919	Third Lanark		
1920–1924	Sheffield United	62	(4)
1924–1925	Manchester City	4	(0)
1925	Dykehead		
Total		66	(4)
- * Club domestic league appearances and goals

James McCourt (8 September 1896–unknown) was a Scottish footballer who played in the Football League for Manchester City and Sheffield United.
