= Philip McCloy =

Scottish footballer

Phil McCloy
Personal information
- Date of birth: April 1896
- Place of birth: Uddingston, Scotland
- Date of death: 1971 (aged 74–75)
- Place of death: Bellshill, Scotland
- Position: Defender

Senior career*
Years	Team	Apps	(Gls)
1918–1925	Ayr United	248	(8)
1918–1919	→ Clyde (loan)	1	(0)
1925–1930	Manchester City	147	(0)
1930–1931	Chester City		
1931–1933	Cork City		
1933	Rennes	2	(0)
1933–	Workington		
- Kidderminster Harriers

International career
1924–1925	Scotland	2	(0)

Managerial career
- 1933: Rennes
- * Club domestic league appearances and goals

Philip McCloy (April 1896 – 1972) was a Scottish footballer who played as a full back. McCloy won two caps for Scotland during a seven-year spell with Ayr United. He then played 157 times for Manchester City between 1925 and 1929.

On his international debut in 1924, he was selected alongside fellow newcomer and Ayr United teammate Jock Smith in the Scottish defence against England at Wembley, the match ending in a draw. The following year he was on the winning side in the same fixture at Hampden Park, this time partnered by Jimmy McStay of Celtic.

McCloy was later player-manager of French club Rennes for a short period in 1933.

== Honours ==
Manchester City

- FA Cup runner-up: 1925–26
