= Arthur Daniels (footballer) =

English footballer

Personal information
- Place of birth: Mossley, Lancashire, England
- Height: 5 ft 9 1/2 in (1.77 m)
- Position: Left winger

Senior career*
Years	Team	Apps	(Gls)
1923–1926	Manchester City	31	(1)
1926–1930	Watford	136	(16)
1930–1931	Queens Park Rangers	14	(3)
- * Club domestic league appearances and goals

Arthur W. C. Daniels was an English footballer from Mossley, Lancashire. He played in the Football League for Manchester City, Watford and Queens Park Rangers. He was described as a "shrewd and speedy left-winger".

Daniels signed for his hometown club in 1920 after briefly playing for a works team in Salford. He scored two goals in 18 Mossley appearances in the 1920–21 season.

Daniels made his first team debut for Manchester City against Tottenham Hotspur in a First Division match in March 1923. He provided the cross for Manchester City's only goal in a 3–1 defeat, leading the Manchester Guardian to describe him as "the best forward in the line". He proceeded to play a further nine consecutive matches, but this proved to be his longest run in the team, and he spent most of the next three seasons in the reserves. He scored one goal for the club, a late consolation in a 4–2 defeat at Bolton in February 1925. In total he made 32 appearances for the Manchester club.

Daniels left Manchester City in 1926, and joined Watford, of the Third Division South. He scored in a 10–1 FA Cup win over Lowestoft Town at Vicarage Road, a scoreline which remains Watford's biggest ever winning margin at the stadium. Daniels was ever-present for Watford during the 1927–28 season, and continued to play regularly for the remainder of his time there. He left Watford to join nearby QPR in 1930, before departing the club at the end of the 1930–31 season.
