= James Calderwood =

Scottish footballer

Personal information
- Full name: James Cuthbertson Calderwood
- Date of birth: 19 December 1898
- Place of birth: Busby, East Renfrewshire, Scotland
- Date of death: 1968 (aged 69–70)
- Height: 5 ft 9 in (1.75 m)
- Position: Full-back

Senior career*
Years	Team	Apps	(Gls)
1921–1922	Manchester Calico Printers		
1922–1927	Manchester City	35	(0)
1927–1930	Grimsby Town	74	(0)
- * Club domestic league appearances and goals

James Cuthbertson Calderwood (19 December 1898 – June 1968) was a Scottish professional footballer who played as a full-back.
