= Matt Barrass (footballer, born 1899) =

English footballer (1899–1953)

Personal information
- Full name: Matthew Williamson Barrass
- Date of birth: 14 February 1899
- Place of birth: Seaham, County Durham, England
- Date of death: 1953 (aged 53–54)
- Positions: Half-back; forward

Senior career*
Years	Team	Apps	(Gls)
1919–1925	Blackpool	168	(53)
1925–1926	Sheffield Wednesday	48	(14)
1926–1932	Manchester City	162	(14)
1933–1934	Ashton National	45	(7)
- * Club domestic league appearances and goals

Matthew Williamson Barrass (14 February 1899 – 1953) was an English footballer who played for Blackpool, Sheffield Wednesday and Manchester City as a half-back or forward.

His son, Malcolm, who was also a professional footballer, was born in Blackpool during his father's spell at the town's club. His great-grandson – also named Matt – was also a professional player.

== Career ==
Barrass was born in Seaham and started his career with Blackpool in 1919. He remained at Bloomfield Road for six years, making 168 league appearances and scoring 53 goals. He made his debut for the club on the final day of the 1919–20 league season, in a 3–2 home victory over Nottingham Forest.

In first full season at Blackpool, 1920–21, Barrass made 32 league appearances and scored nine goals (including the only goals in a victories at Leicester City on 11 December 1920, and at home to Nottingham Forest on 22 January 1921).

In 1922–23, Barrass scored sixteen league goals, including a hat-trick in a 3–0 win against Bradford City at Bloomfield Road on 9 September 1922.

He scored another treble in 1924–25, in a 6–2 victory at Sheffield Wednesday on Christmas Day.

Barrass' final game for Blackpool occurred on 14 March 1925, in a 3–0 defeat at Chelsea.

He joined Sheffield Wednesday shortly afterwards, and went on to make 48 league appearances for the Owls, scoring fourteen goals.

Barrass signed for Manchester City in 1926, the first major purchase made by Peter Hodge. He made a goalscoring debut on the opening day of the 1926–27 season, and later that season scored a hat-trick against Clapton Orient. He was part of the Manchester City side which won the Second Division in 1928, and continued to play for Manchester City until 1932, making a total of 172 appearances and scoring 15 goals.
