= Sam Cookson (English footballer) =

English footballer (1896–1955)

Personal information
- Date of birth: 1896
- Place of birth: Manchester, England
- Date of death: 1955 (aged 58–59)
- Height: 5 ft 8 1/2 in (1.74 m)
- Position: Right back

Senior career*
Years	Team	Apps	(Gls)
1919–1928	Manchester City	285	(0)
- * Club domestic league appearances and goals

Sam Cookson (1896–1955) was an English footballer who played in the right full back position.

== Early life ==
Sam Cookson was born in Manchester in 1896. He began his footballing career playing for Stalybridge Celtic. During weekdays Cookson was a miner and worked down a pit. At the weekends he played football "purely for enjoyment". The mine work endowed Cookson with a powerful physique "which sometimes proved deceptive to opposition forwards". He subsequently played for Macclesfield Town before joining Manchester City.

== Manchester City ==
In 1919 he signed for Manchester City, whom he would play for until 1927, making 285 appearances for the team in the League and 306 appearances overall. His only goal for the club came in a 3–3 draw with Corinthian in the 1925–26 FA Cup. Cookson is often described as one of the best uncapped full backs of his generation. He formed a long-lasting defensive partnership with Eli Fletcher at City. His first team debut occurred in a 1–0 win over Bradford City in December 1919. Tommy Browell scored City's only goal in that game. That season City finished seventh in the First Division with 45 points.

In the 1920–21 season, Cookson made 42 appearances for Manchester City who came second in the league, five points behind champions Burnley, which was City's highest position in the league since the 1903–04 season, when City had a team which included Billie Gillespie, Frank Booth and Billy Meredith. The following season, 1921–22, Meredith returned to Manchester City and played alongside Cookson on the right side of the City team. Cookson made 39 league appearances for Manchester City that season and City finished tenth in the league with 45 points.

In the 1922–23 season the City team was further enhanced by the acquisition of Frank Roberts from Bolton Wanderers. He joined a City attack which also included Horace Barnes and Tommy Johnson. The team finished eighth in the league, again with 45 points. In the 1923–24 season Manchester City moved to a new ground, Maine Road, and Horace Barnes scored the first goal at the new stadium in a 2–1 victory against Sheffield United on the opening day of the season. The team ultimately finished eleventh in the league on 42 points. Cookson played in all of City's eight games in the FA Cup that season. The team were ultimately defeated 2–0 in the semi-final by Newcastle United.

In the following season City's defence was enhanced by the acquisition of Sam Cowan from Doncaster Rovers. Cookson made 37 appearances for City that season and the team finished in tenth place with 43 points. In the 1925–26 season, Cookson was part of the Manchester City team which were relegated to the Second Division. Cookson would never appear in the First Division again. Cookson also played for City in the FA Cup final that season against Bolton Wanderers, but finished on the losing side. England international David Jack scored the only goal of the game. In the 1926–27 season, City finished third in the Second Division, eight points behind winners Middlesbrough. His final appearance for the club came in the 1927–28 football season in which the team won promotion to the First Division.

== Later career ==
Cookson subsequently played for Barnsley, whom City purchased Eric Brook and Fred Tilson from. Despite a long and distinguished career, the only honour that Cookson won was gained at the age of 39, a Third Division North title with Barnsley. His brother Jimmy also played for Manchester City, where he did not make the first team, and later played for Chesterfield and West Bromwich Albion.

== Legacy ==
Cookson is regarded as one of Manchester City's greatest ever players. In 1977 Manchester City Council named eleven streets in a new estate in Moss Side after famous City players including Cookson, Frank Swift, Fred Tilson, Sam Cowan, Horace Barnes, Max Woosnam, Tommy Browell, Jimmy McMullan, Eric Brook, Billy Meredith and Tommy Johnson. In Ian Penney's book The Essential History of Manchester City, Cookson is listed as the club's 49th greatest ever player.

== Honours ==
Manchester City

- FA Cup runner-up: 1925–26
