= Billy Austin (footballer) =

English footballer

S.W. 'Billy' Austin
Personal information
- Full name: S.W. Austin
- Date of birth: 29 April 1900
- Place of birth: Arnold, England
- Date of death: 2 April 1979 (aged 78)
- Place of death: Kidderminster, England
- Height: 5 ft 9 in (1.75 m)
- Position: Outside right

Senior career*
Years	Team	Apps	(Gls)
1918	Arnold United		
1919–1920	Sheffield United	0	(0)
1919	Arnold St. Mary's		
1920–1924	Norwich City	164	(39)
1924–1930	Manchester City	172	(47)
1930–1932	Worcester City	28	(31)
1931–1933	Chesterfield F.C.	51	(7)
1933–1936	Kidderminster Harriers		
1936–1937	Racing Club de Roubaix	0	(0)
1947	Brinton FC		

International career
1925	England	1	(0)
- * Club domestic league appearances and goals

S.W. Austin (29 April 1900 – 2 April 1979) registered as Sam William but also known as Billy, Samuel, Sydney and Willie, was an English professional footballer who played professionally for Norwich City, Manchester City and Chesterfield. He also won one England cap in 1925.

== Club career ==
=== Early career ===
Austin, born in Arnold, Nottinghamshire, started playing football immediately after World War I, with local Midlands League Club, Arnold United, as a goalkeeper. During the 1919–20 season, he had a trial with Sheffield United. Unsuccessful trials also followed with Notts County and Nottingham Forest and he also represented another local side, Arnold St Mary's. Eventually, Austin's position was changed to ring wing and he was snapped up by Norwich City in October 1920.

=== Norwich City ===
In October 1920, when Austin was signed by Norwich, they were a newly elected Football League club. He made his Football League Third Division South debut the same month against Bristol Rovers and quickly established himself as a key figure for the Canaries. During four seasons at The Nest, he missed only three matches and was ever-present in the 1923–24 campaign, scoring 14 goals to finish as the club's second-highest scorer by a single goal. His consistent performances attracted the attention of First Division Manchester City, who secured his transfer in May 1924, for £1,750.

=== Manchester City ===
Austin adapted to First Division football and he replaced right winger Billy Meredith. He gained support from the Maine Road supporters for his performance.

The 1925–26 season proved bittersweet for Austin. He contributed a career-best 15 goals and also scored twice in a 6–1 hammering of local rivals Manchester United. As well as this, he helped Manchester City reach the 1926 FA Cup final, but they were beaten 1–0 by Bolton Wanderers at Wembley.

Manchester City were also relegated from the top flight that same season, with Austin missing a vital penalty in the last match of the season. In 2000, The Guardian wrote about Austin's penalty miss against Newcastle being one of the ten worst penalty misses of all time: "On the last day of the 1925–26 season Manchester City went to Newcastle needing a point to avoid relegation from the First Division. A run of four consecutive wins suggested they would do so. They were awarded a penalty, only for outside-right Billy Austin to miss it. It proved a crucial error: Newcastle won 3–2 and City went down."

Austin remained loyal to the club and played a key role in their Second Division Championship win in the 1927–28 season. Notably, on 14 January 1928, he stood in as an emergency goalkeeper in an FA Cup tie against Leeds United and kept a clean sheet in a 1–0 victory.

Back in the First Division, Austin missed only four matches during Manchester City’s 1928–29 campaign as they secured an eighth-place finish. However, Austin lost his regular place and did not feature at all in the 1929–30 season, making just four further appearances in the late autumn of the 1930–31 season. He was then placed on the transfer list in January 1931 and departed to join Worcester City, to play in non-League football. In total, Austin played 172 matches for Manchester City, scoring 47 goals. Three of those appearances were as an emergency goalkeeper.

=== Non-League football ===
Austin was snapped up by Worcester City manager Joe Smith without a transfer fee as he was not moving to another Football League club. He was an immediate success, scoring in a record 11 consecutive Birmingham League matches, and by the end of the season had 19 goals, including 5 away at Hereford.

=== Chesterfield and return to Worcester City ===
In the 1931–32 season, Austin tried to re-establish himself in the Football League with Chesterfield in the Second Division but in November 1931 he was allowed to return to return to Worcester on a match-by-match basis. The impact was again instant. In his first match back on 21 November 1931, Sam scored 6 times as City beat Bilston 18–1 (an individual record which he shares with three other players, Alex Hair, Billy Boswell and John Inglis). It was his only Worcester City game before Christmas, but in the second half of the campaign he appeared more often and finished up playing 17 times (12 goals). Austin finished with 31 goals in 28 games for Worcester City. He finished with 51 appearances (7 goals) for Chesterfield.

=== Kidderminster Harriers ===
Released by Chesterfield in May 1933, he was signed by Kidderminster Harriers. He enjoyed three excellent years at Aggborough, playing regularly and winning the Birmingham Senior Cup in the 1933–34 season, playing in the final against Burton. He also was part of the team that then retained the same cup, during the 1934–35 season, beating Nuneaton Town in the final. In the 1934–35 season, Austin also won the Worcester Senior Cup by beating Aston Villa in the final. The following season, he was part of the Harriers' 1935–36 FA Cup run to the second round proper (they eventually lost 4–1 at Workington).

=== Racing Club de Roubaix ===
In 1936, he moved to France, joining Racing Club de Roubaix during a period when many English professionals were transferring to the French League. It is reported that he did not play any official matches for the club.

=== Amateur football ===
Remarkably, in November 1947, the Norwich Press reported that Austin, then aged 47, had been reinstated as an amateur and was still playing football for Brinton FC in the Kidderminster League.

== International career ==
His performances at Manchester City earned him international recognition the following year. On 24 October 1925, he won his only full England cap in a 0–0 draw against Ireland at Windsor Park, Belfast. His legacy number is 497. Austin also represented The Football League XI vs Irish League XI, on 5 October 1925 - winning 5–1..

== Career statistics ==
=== Club ===
Appearances and goals by club, season and competition
Club	Season	League				FA Cup			Total	
Club	Season	Division	Position	Apps	Goals	Round	Apps	Goals	Apps	Goals
Arnold United	1918	Nottingham District League								
Sheffield United	1919–20	First Division	14th	0	0	R2	0	0	0	0
Arnold St. Mary's	1919					4th Q				
Norwich City	1920–21	Third Division South	16th	29	4	R1	0	0	29	4
Norwich City	1921–22	Third Division South	15th	41	9	R1	5	3	46	12
Norwich City	1922–23	Third Division South	18th	40	9	R1	4	0	44	9
Norwich City	1923–24	Third Division South	11th	42	13	R3	3	1	45	14
Norwich City	Total		League	152	35	FA Cup	12	4	164	39
Manchester City	1924–25	First Division	10th	38	6	R1	1	0	39	6
Manchester City	1925–26	First Division	21st	36	12	Final (Runners Up)	7	3	43	15
Manchester City	1926–27	Second Division	3rd	26	10	R3	1	0	27	19
Manchester City	1927–28	Second Division	1st	18	9	R5	2	0	20	9
Manchester City	1928–29	First Division	8th	38	5	R3	1	1	39	6
Manchester City	1929–30	First Division	3rd	0	0	R5	0	0	0	0
Manchester City	1930–31	First Division	8th	4	1	R3	0	0	4	1
Manchester City	Total		League	160	43	FA Cup	12	4	172	47
Worcester City	1930–31	Birmingham and District League	5th	11	19	4th Q	0	0	11	19
Worcester City	1931–32	Birmingham and District League	2nd	17	12	PR	0	0	17	12
Worcester City	Total		League	28	31	FA Cup	0	0	28	31
Chesterfield	1931–32	Second Division	17th	23	5	R4	2	0	25	5
Chesterfield	1932–33	Second Division	21st	22	1	R5	4	1	26	2
Chesterfield	Total		League	51	7	FA Cup	6	1	51	7
Kidderminster Harriers	1933–34	Birmingham and District League	3rd			1st Q				
Kidderminster Harriers	1934-35	Birmingham and District League	2nd			3rd Q				
Kidderminster Harriers	1935–36	Birmingham and District League	4th			R2				
Kidderminster Harriers	Total									
Racing Club de Roubaix	1936–37	French Division 1	12th	0	0	n/a			0	0
Racing Club de Roubaix	Total			0	0					
Brinton FC	1947	The Kidderminster League								
Career Total			League	391	116	FA Cup	30	9	421	125

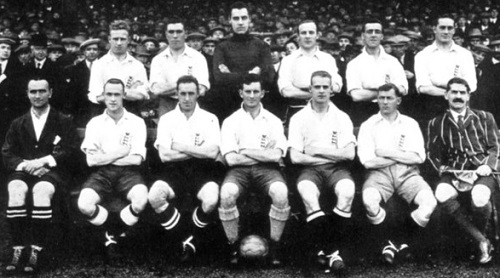

=== International ===
Appearances and goals by national team and year
National team	Year	Apps	Goals
England	1925	1	0
Total		1	0

== Honours ==
Manchester City

- Football League Second Division: 1927–28
- FA Cup runner-up: 1925–26

Worcester City

- Birmingham and District League runner-up: 1931–32

Kidderminster Harriers

- Birmingham Senior Cup:1933–34, 1934–35
- Worcester Senior Cup: 1934–35
- Birmingham and District League runner-up: 1934–35

== Additional sources ==
- Mark Davage; John Eastwood; Kevin Platt (2001). Canary Citizens. Jarrold Publishing. ISBN 0-7117-2020-7.
