= Sam Cowan =

English footballer and manager (1901–1964)

- The King presents Sam Cowan with the FA Cup in 1934

Personal information
- Full name: Samuel Cowan
- Date of birth: 10 May 1901
- Place of birth: Chesterfield, England
- Date of death: 4 October 1964 (aged 63)
- Place of death: Haywards Heath, England
- Height: 5 ft 9 in (1.75 m)
- Position: Centre half

Youth career
- Adwick Juniors
- Huddersfield Town

Senior career*
Years	Team	Apps	(Gls)
- Denaby United
- Bullcroft Main Colliery
1923–1924	Doncaster Rovers	48	(13)
1924–1935	Manchester City	369	(19)
1935–1937	Bradford City	57	(1)
1937–1938	Mossley	39	(1)

International career
1926–1931	England	3	(0)

Managerial career
- 1937–1938: Mossley (player-manager)
- 1946–1947: Manchester City
- * Club domestic league appearances and goals

Samuel Cowan (10 May 1901 – 4 October 1964) was an English football player and manager. A relative latecomer to the sport, Cowan did not play football until he was 17 and was 22 by the time he turned professional. He made his league debut for Doncaster Rovers in 1923, and signed for First Division Manchester City the following season.

Cowan played centre half for Manchester City for 11 seasons, captaining the team in the early to mid-1930s. Alongside David Silva and Vincent Kompany, he is the only other player to have represented Manchester City in three FA Cup finals, as a runner-up in 1926 and 1933, and as a winner in 1934. Internationally, he gained three England caps between 1926 and 1931. In total he played 407 times for Manchester City, putting him 12th in terms of all-time appearances. In 1935, he transferred to Bradford City, and subsequently moved to Mossley as player-manager.

In 1938, Cowan joined Brighton & Hove Albion as a coach, and set up a physiotherapy business. He returned to Manchester City as manager in 1946, winning the Second Division in his only season in charge. He continued to work in sports and physiotherapy until his death in 1964.

== Football career ==
=== Early career ===
Cowan was born on 10 May 1901 in Chesterfield, but moved further north in his early years and was raised in Adwick le Street near Doncaster. He did not play football as a child, only gaining an interest in the sport when he took part in a game at a local park aged 17. He then started to play for local teams, including Adwick Juniors, Bullcroft Main Colliery and Denaby United and had an unsuccessful trial at Huddersfield Town.

In 1923, Cowan gained his first professional contract following a successful trial at his local league club, Doncaster Rovers of the Third Division (North). Despite playing as a defender, during his time at Doncaster he scored regularly, including a hat-trick of headed goals against Halifax Town in March 1924. His performances gained the attention of bigger clubs, and in December 1924 he joined Manchester City, who sought a successor to the likes of Mick Hamill and Max Woosnam.

=== Manchester City ===
Cowan made his Manchester City debut in a 2–2 draw against Birmingham City on 20 December 1924, and scored his first goal for the club two weeks later, against Nottingham Forest. He played in all but one of the remaining league matches that season, 21 in total.

Starting all but four of Manchester City's matches in the 1925–26 season, Cowan was a key part of the team which reached the 1926 FA Cup Final, winning several ties by wide margins en route. However, in the final City were beaten 1–0 by Bolton Wanderers. Further disappointment followed in the league, when after a campaign characterised by erratic form, City were relegated on the final day of the season. By this time Cowan's reputation as a competent centre-back had grown, and he received an international call-up. He made his England debut on 24 May 1926 playing an unfamiliar left-half role in a 5–3 win against Belgium. By 1931, he had earned three international caps, the others gained in matches against France and Austria. He also made appearances for the Football League team, including a trial match against England in 1931.

In the 1926–27 season, Cowan made 27 appearances as his club sought an immediate return to the top division. The race for promotion went to the final match, with Manchester City and Portsmouth both in contention for the second of the two promotion places. Cowan played in a resounding City win, an 8–0 victory against Bradford City. The watching crowd believed the result to be sufficient for promotion, but Portsmouth's match had been delayed by 15 minutes and was still in progress. A late Portsmouth goal meant the final scoreline in their match was a 5–1 win, enough to give Portsmouth second place on goal average by a margin of one two-hundredth of a goal. The club won the Second Division championship the following season, gaining promotion to the top flight. The Second Division championship was Cowan's first honour in professional football.

In the early 1930s, Cowan became Manchester City captain, succeeding Jimmy McMullan. During his captaincy the club reached two further FA Cup Finals. The first of these was in 1933, against Everton. During the match Cowan was up against Everton captain Dixie Dean. Both players were renowned for their heading ability. Matt Busby claimed that Cowan could "head a ball as far as most of us could kick it", but Dean prevailed in the aerial battle, scoring Everton's second goal with a header. The Daily Mail observed that Dean's presence gave Cowan a dilemma: "He was torn between a determination not to leave Dean and a desire to help his forwards. He broke down between the two." Everton were 3–0 victors, but when Cowan received his runner's up medal from the Duke of York, he remarked that he would come back next year to win. True to Cowan's word, City returned to Wembley the following year. In the 1934 FA Cup Final, Cowan became the first and thus far only Manchester City player to represent the club in three FA Cup finals. He captained City to a 2–1 victory over Portsmouth. As team captain Cowan held primary responsibility for motivating his fellow players and match tactics. This was typical for a captain of his era, as managers of the period were chiefly administrators who had little input into coaching and tactics.

Cowan's final season at Maine Road was 1934–35, in which he was ever-present. His final match for the club was a 5–0 defeat of Wolverhampton Wanderers on 4 May 1935. In total he made 407 appearances for Manchester City, scoring 24 goals. As of 2008 he ranks 12th all-time for Manchester City appearances. Bob Donnelly was signed to replace him in the 1935 close season, and Bradford City signed Cowan for a fee of £2,000 in October 1935. At the time the transfer fee was the second highest ever paid by the club.

=== Bradford City ===
Bradford City were struggling in the Second Division at the time of Cowan's signing, having won just one of their first ten games of the 1935–36 season. Cowan made his debut for them on 19 October 1935 in a 2–2 draw with Swindon Town, but it was not until Cowan's third game that Bradford won for the second time that season. Cowan missed just three of the club's remaining fixtures that season, playing 29 times in the league and three in the FA Cup as City finished 12th. The following season, City again struggled. Cowan missed just one of the first 23 games, but after Christmas, he was restricted to just six; and without Cowan, Bradford finished 21st and were relegated to the Third Division (North).

=== Managerial career ===
In 1937, Cowan was appointed player-manager at Mossley. He led the club to the seventh place in the Cheshire League and to the Manchester Challenge Shield title. On the pitch, he played 39 matches and scored one goal. At the end of the season Cowan resigned to join Brighton & Hove Albion coaching staff. In October 1945, a shortage of players resulted in Cowan taking to the field in a wartime match against Bournemouth & Boscombe Athletic. Aged 44 years and 156 days, he became the oldest ever Brighton player. While at Brighton, Cowan started a physiotherapy business based near the Goldstone Ground.

In November 1946, Cowan became Manchester City manager, succeeding Wilf Wild, who moved to a purely administrative role. Cowan had been known for his motivational skills as a player, and was part of a new generation of managers who took responsibility for tactics and team selection, of which Cowan's contemporary and former teammate Matt Busby became the most well-known. Cowan was given a salary of £2,000, and came to an agreement whereby he spent part of the week with the Manchester City team and part looking after his business interests in Brighton. His first match as manager was a 3–0 win against Newport County, and the team then embarked upon a run of 19 matches without defeat. Despite achieving the Division Two title in his first season in charge, Cowan resigned in June 1947 as his commute from Brighton caused tension with club officials.

== Post-football ==
Cowan later worked as a physiotherapist for cricket club Sussex CCC and ice hockey team Brighton Tigers. As a trainer with the Tigers he was named in the British National League All Star team for three years running from 1956 to 1958. He died on 4 October 1964 aged 63, when he suffered a heart attack, while refereeing a football charity match in aid of Sussex wicket keeper Jim Parks. He left behind a widow and one son. In 2004, he was elected to Manchester City's Hall of Fame. A street near Manchester City's former ground Maine Road, Sam Cowan Close, is named in his honour.

== Honours ==
=== As a player ===
Manchester City

- FA Cup: 1933–34; runner-up: 1925–26, 1932–33
- Football League Second Division: 1927–28

=== As a manager ===
Mossley

- Manchester Challenge Shield: 1937

Manchester City

- Football League Second Division: 1946–47
