= Jack Warner (footballer, born 1898) =

English footballer

Personal information
- Full name: John Warner
- Date of birth: 1898
- Place of birth: Woolwich, England
- Date of death: 1950 (aged 51–52)
- Place of death: Greenwich, England
- Height: 5 ft 8 in (1.73 m)
- Position: Inside forward

Senior career*
Years	Team	Apps	(Gls)
1919–1920	Burnley	0	(0)
1920–1926	Manchester City	76	(15)
1926–1930	Watford	110	(22)
1930–1932	Thames	57	(2)
Total		243	(39)
- * Club domestic league appearances and goals

John Warner (1898 – 23 August 1950) was an English professional footballer who played as an inside forward.
