= Charlie Pringle =

Scottish footballer (1894–1966)

Personal information
- Full name: Charles Ross Pringle
- Date of birth: 18 October 1894
- Place of birth: Nitshill, Scotland
- Date of death: 1966 (aged 71–72)
- Place of death: Johnstone, Scotland
- Height: 5 ft 7 in (1.70 m)
- Position: Wing half

Youth career
- Inkerman Rangers
- Maryhill Juniors

Senior career*
Years	Team	Apps	(Gls)
- Maryhill
1916–1922	St Mirren	181	(14)
1922–1928	Manchester City	197	(1)
1928–1929	Manchester Central	??	(??)
1929–1931	Bradford (Park Avenue)	44	(1)
1931–1933	Lincoln City	58	(1)
1933	Stockport County	0	(0)

International career
1921	Scottish Football League XI	1	(0)
1921	Scotland	1	(0)
- * Club domestic league appearances and goals

Charles Ross Pringle (18 October 1894 – 1966) was a Scottish footballer who played as a wing half.

== Career ==
Born in the village of Nitshill, south of Glasgow, Pringle's first professional club was St Mirren, for whom he signed during World War I. On 12 February 1921 he won his only cap for Scotland in a 2–1 win against Wales.

In 1922 Pringle signed for Manchester City, making his debut on 26 August 1922 in the opening game of the 1922–23 season, a 2–0 defeat at Sheffield United. He then proceeded to play in every Manchester City match for over a year. He was part of the Manchester City team which played in the 1926 FA Cup Final, and was captain for part of his City career. After winning a Second Division champions medal in 1927–28, Pringle left Manchester City in the close season as part of a venture to form a new club, Manchester Central F.C.

He later played for Bradford Park Avenue, Lincoln City and Stockport County. After his playing career finished he became a coach. His coaching career included a spell at his former club St Mirren.

Pringle married Lily Meredith, the daughter of fellow Manchester City player Billy Meredith, and played in the same team as his father-in-law seven times.

== Honours ==
Manchester City

- FA Cup runner-up: 1925–26
