= Sammy Sharp =

English footballer

Personal information
- Full name: Samuel Sharp
- Date of birth: 1896
- Place of birth: Ardwick, Manchester, England
- Date of death: 1936 (aged 39–40)
- Place of death: Gisburn, Lancashire, England
- Height: 5 ft 8 in (1.73 m)
- Position: Wing half

Senior career*
Years	Team	Apps	(Gls)
1918–1919?	Manchester City	0	(0)
1919?–1920?	Bolton Wanderers	0	(0)
1920?–1929	Manchester City	176	(0)
1929–1931	Crewe Alexandra	60	(0)
1931	Wigan Borough	4	(0)
- * Club domestic league appearances and goals

Samuel Sharp (1896 – 1936) was a footballer who played as a wing half in the 1920s and 1930s, most notably with Manchester City.

Born in Ardwick, Manchester, Sharp first played for Manchester City in wartime competition in 1918, before a short spell with Bolton Wanderers, although he did not play a Football League game for them.

Sharp returned to Manchester City in 1920 and went on to make 176 Football League appearances for them, plus six more in the FA Cup, in which competition he scored his only City goal. He was in the City side on 13 January 1923 when they were surprisingly beaten by Football League Third Division South side Charlton Athletic.

He made his Football League debut for City on 18 February 1920 against Middlesbrough, but he did not become a City regular until the 1922–23 season, during which he missed only one game. He remained a regular in the team until the 1925–26 season, when he lost his place to Baggy Coupland. It was during this period in the team that he scored his only goal, in an FA Cup tie against Brighton & Hove Albion on 23 February 1924. After losing his regular place in the side he continued to make sporadic appearances over the next few seasons, with his final City game coming on 25 April 1928 against Leeds United, in a 1–0 win which clinched the Football League Second Division title for City.

After leaving City he played for Crewe Alexandra and Wigan Borough.
