= Tommy Johnson (footballer, born 1901) =

English footballer (1901–1973)

Personal information
- Full name: Thomas Clark Fisher Johnson
- Date of birth: 19 August 1901
- Place of birth: Dalton-in-Furness, England
- Date of death: 28 January 1973 (aged 71)
- Place of death: Manchester, England
- Height: 5 ft 9 1/2 in (1.77 m)
- Position: Striker

Youth career
- Dalton Athletic
- Dalton Casuals

Senior career*
Years	Team	Apps	(Gls)
1919–1930	Manchester City	328	(158)
1930–1934	Everton	146	(56)
1934–1936	Liverpool	36	(8)
1936–1939	Darwen		
Total		511	(222)

International career
1926–1933	England	5	(5)
- * Club domestic league appearances and goals

Thomas Clark Fisher Johnson (19 August 1901 – 28 January 1973) was an English footballer who played as either a centre forward or an inside forward. He started his professional career at Manchester City in 1919, and represented the club throughout the 1920s. Known for his powerful left foot shot, Johnson held the record for the most goals scored by a Manchester City player in a single season, with 38 goals in 1928–29. He played for Manchester City in the 1926 FA Cup Final, and was a member of the City side which won the Second Division in 1927.

Johnson signed for Everton in 1930, acting as a foil for the prolific centre-forward Dixie Dean. In four seasons at Everton, Johnson won the Second Division, the First Division and the FA Cup, before finishing his professional career with a short spell at Liverpool.

== Personal life ==
Johnson was born at Dalton-in-Furness, Lancashire on 19 August 1901, the son of John and Margaret Johnson. He was baptised at Dalton-in-Furness on 8 September 1901.

He married Hannah Smith at Manchester Cathedral on 4 November 1924, the couple had one son.

== Career ==
=== Manchester City ===
Born in Dalton-in-Furness, Lancashire, Johnson became an apprentice at the local shipyard. He played football part-time for Dalton Athletic and Dalton Casuals until 1919, when he signed a professional contract with Manchester City following a recommendation from City defender Eli Fletcher; Fletcher had threatened to leave the club if Johnson was not signed. He made a goalscoring debut in a war league match against Blackburn Rovers on 22 February 1919, and scored a hat-trick against Port Vale a fortnight later. League football returned in August 1919, but Johnson did not play for the first team until much later in the season. He made his league debut against Middlesbrough on 18 February 1920 scoring both goals in a 2–0 win, playing in the position previously occupied by Tommy Browell. He kept his place for a further six matches, scoring one more goal. The final match in this run of appearances was a 2–1 win against Liverpool at Hyde Road, which was attended by the reigning monarch, King George V. Johnson made a further three appearances in the remainder of the season.

Over the next two seasons Johnson featured intermittently in the first team. He scored five goals in 12 appearances for the first team in 1920–21, playing more regularly for the reserves, for whom he was the leading goalscorer with 18 goals. He became a regular first team selection in 1922–23, playing 35 matches. In 1923 Manchester City moved from Hyde Road to a new stadium, Maine Road, in the Moss Side area of the city. Johnson scored in the first match at the new stadium, against Sheffield United. While Johnson was a regular goalscorer at this point in his career, he did not score as frequently as teammates Frank Roberts and Horace Barnes. Firmly established in the first team, he missed only one match in the 1924–25 season.

In the 1925–26 season Johnson reached the 20 goal mark for the first time, despite playing in a side struggling at the bottom of the division. Though the team endured a difficult league season, some of their wins were high scoring, including a record 6–1 Manchester derby win in which Johnson made a goalscoring appearance. The FA Cup proved a fruitful competition for the club that season, as they reached the final, scoring 31 goals in six matches. Johnson played in every cup match, scoring his first competitive hat-trick in the quarter-final, against Clapton Orient. However, Johnson's appearance at Wembley was not a happy one, his Manchester City team losing the final 1–0 to Bolton Wanderers. To compound the disappointment, City lost their final league game and were relegated to the Second Division. Three weeks after the end of the season Johnson made his debut for England, scoring in a 5–3 win against Belgium. Johnson played 5 times for England and scored five goals.

The following season, Johnson was City's leading goalscorer with 25 goals as the club sought an immediate return to the top division. The race for promotion went to the final match, with Manchester City and Portsmouth both in contention for the second of the two promotion places. Johnson starred in a resounding City win, scoring a hat-trick in an 8–0 victory against Bradford City. The watching crowd believed the result to be sufficient for promotion, but Portsmouth's match had been delayed by 15 minutes and was still in progress. A late Portsmouth goal meant the final scoreline in their match was a 5–1 win, enough to give Portsmouth second place on goal average by a margin of one two-hundredth of a goal. Johnson and his teammates overcame the disappointment of the preceding season in 1927–28, winning the Second Division to return to the top flight. His Second Division winner's medal was to be the only honour Johnson won in his Manchester City career. He reached the 20 goal mark for the third consecutive season, finishing joint-top goalscorer with Frank Roberts.

The first season back in the top division proved to be a remarkable one for Johnson. Early in the season he scored five goals in a single match, a 6–2 win away to Everton. He continued to score frequently throughout the season, and by March 1929 he had become only the third Manchester City player to score 30 goals in a season, equalling the record previously set by Tommy Browell and Frank Roberts. He surpassed both in his next match, and by the end of the season he had scored 38 goals in 39 league appearances, a club record which has been beaten once in 2023 by Erling Haaland. His form during 1929 resulted in an England recall, three years after gaining his previous cap. Johnson scored twice in a 6–0 British Home Championship win against Wales. The other goals were scored by George Camsell (who scored a hat trick) and Hugh Adcock.

In March 1930, with the club management believing him to be past his peak, Johnson was sold to Everton for £6,000. His departure sparked protests by Manchester City fans, resulting in drop of 7,000 in the club's attendances. In total, Johnson scored 166 goals in 354 appearances for Manchester City. This tally includes 158 league goals, a record for a Manchester City player shared with Eric Brook, Johnson's successor as the team's all-time leading goalscorer in all competitions until Brook's record was broken by Sergio Aguero in 2017.

=== Everton and Liverpool ===
At Everton, Johnson was part of a forward line spearheaded by record-breaking goalscorer Dixie Dean. In Johnson's first full season Everton won the Second Division Championship, and in his second the club won the First Division, becoming the English champions. The following season Everton reached the 1933 FA Cup Final, where Johnson faced his former club Manchester City. Everton were comfortable victors, winning 3–0, and seven years after suffering defeat in an FA Cup final Johnson gained a winners medal. Accounts of the match suggest Johnson had a quiet game, with reports focusing on the play of Dixie Dean and Cliff Britton. The final was the first to use shirt numbers to identify the players, Johnson becoming the competition's first number 10. During his Everton career Johnson won a further three England caps. Johnson scored twice in a 7–1 victory over Spain in 1931. Jack Smith and Sammy Crooks also scored braces while Dixie Dean scored the other goal.

In the 1932 British Home Championship Johnson was part of the team that defeated Scotland 3–0 with goals from Tom Waring, Bobby Barclay and Sammy Crooks. England won the championship that year. Johnson's last cap was earned against Ireland in a 1–0 victory.

Johnson moved to Liverpool in March 1934. Liverpool were struggling to avoid relegation from the First Division when Johnson joined the club, having won only one match in 17 prior to his arrival. Johnson's introduction to the team coincided with an improvement in results, and Liverpool avoided relegation. He played in around half of Liverpool's matches in the 1934–35 season, and made six appearances in his final season as a professional. His final goal was scored against Grimsby in September 1935, and his final professional appearance came against Preston North End in April 1936. After leaving Liverpool he had a period as player-manager of non-league Darwen, who he represented until the outbreak of the Second World War.

== International goals ==
Scores and results list England's goal tally first.

#	Date	Venue	Opponent	Score	Result	Competition
1.	24 May 1926	Olympic Stadium, Antwerp	Belgium	2–1	5–3	Friendly
2.	20 November 1929	Stamford Bridge, London	Wales	1–0	6–0	1930 British Home Championship
3.	20 November 1929	Stamford Bridge, London	Wales	4–0	6–0	1930 British Home Championship
4.	9 December 1931	Arsenal Stadium, London	Spain	2–0	7–1	Friendly
5.	9 December 1931	Arsenal Stadium, London	Spain	6–0	7–1	Friendly

== Later life and death ==
Johnson later became a publican, running the Woodman Inn in Stockport before taking over the Crown Inn in Gorton in February 1939, and lived in the area for the remainder of his life.

He died in Monsall Hospital, Manchester on 28 January 1973, at the age of 71, and was buried at Gorton Cemetery. In 1977 a street near Maine Road, Tommy Johnson Walk, was named in his honour.

== Honours ==
Manchester City

- FA Cup runner-up: 1925–26

Everton

- FA Cup: 1932–33
