= 1936–37 Manchester City F.C. season =

English football club season

Manchester City F.C.
1936–37 season
- Chairman: Bob Smith
- Secretary / Manager: Wilf Wild
- Stadium: Maine Road
- First Division: 1st
- FA Cup: Sixth round
- Top goalscorer: League: Peter Doherty (30); All: Peter Doherty (32)
- Highest home attendance: 75,000 (vs Arsenal, 10 April 1937)
- Lowest home attendance: 16,000 (vs Grimsby Town, 28 December 1936)
- Average home league attendance: 34,000
Home colours	Away colours

The 1936–37 season was Manchester City Football Club's forty-sixth season of league football, with the club winning its first-ever league title and scoring a record 107 goals.

== Match results ==
=== Legend ===
Win	Draw	Loss

=== Football League First Division ===
Game	Date	Opponents	Venue	Result	Score GF–GA	Goalscorers	Attendance	League Position
1	29 August	Middlesbrough	A	L	0–2		23,000	21st
2	2 September	Leeds United	H	W	4–0	Herd, Brook, Tilson, Doherty	25,000	6th
3	5 September	West Bromwich Albion	H	W	6–2	Herd 2, Brook, Heale, Doherty 2	25,000	1st
4	9 September	Leeds United	A	D	1–1	Heale	14,000	4th
5	12 September	Manchester United	A	L	2–3	Herd, Bray	69,000	7th
6	16 September	Birmingham	H	D	1–1	Doherty	20,000	5th
7	19 September	Portsmouth	A	L	1–2	McLeod	25,000	12th
8	26 September	Chelsea	H	D	0–0		30,000	11th
9	3 October	Stoke City	A	D	2–2	Heale, Doherty	36,000	12th
10	10 October	Charlton Athletic	H	D	1–1	Heale	28,000	12th
11	17 October	Derby County	H	W	3–2	Toseland, Heale, Doherty	21,000	8th
12	24 October	Wolverhampton Wanderers	A	L	1–2	Doherty	21,000	13th
13	31 October	Sunderland	H	L	2–4	McLeod, Doherty	39,444	16th
14	7 November	Huddersfield Town	A	D	1–1	Brook	18,000	15th
15	14 November	Everton	H	W	4–1	Rodger 2, Brook, Toseland	28,000	14th
16	21 November	Bolton Wanderers	A	W	2–0	Herd, Brook	32,000	12th
	28 November	Brentford	H		0a0		20,000	
17	5 December	Arsenal	A	W	3–1	Rodger 2, Doherty	42,000	9th
18	12 December	Preston North End	H	W	4–1	Brook, Toseland 2, Doherty	15,000	8th
19	19 December	Sheffield Wednesday	A	L	1–5	Doherty	30,000	9th
20	25 December	Grimsby Town	A	L	3–5	Rodger, Brook, Doherty	18,000	12th
21	26 December	Middlesbrough	H	W	2–1	Rodger, Brook	56,000	11th
22	28 December	Grimsby Town	H	D	1–1	Tilson	16,000	9th
23	2 January	West Bromwich Albion	A	D	2–2	Herd, Tilson	18,000	10th
24	9 January	Manchester United	H	W	1–0	Herd	65,000	10th
25	23 January	Portsmouth	H	W	3–1	Herd, Brook, Toseland	25,000	8th
26	3 February	Chelsea	A	D	4–4	Tilson, Bray, Doherty 2	12,000	8th
27	6 February	Stoke City	H	W	2–1	Tilson, Doherty	30,000	6th
28	13 February	Charlton Athletic	A	D	1–1	Herd	45,000	8th
29	24 February	Derby County	A	W	5–0	Rodger, Brook, Tilson 3	13,000	6th
30	27 February	Wolverhampton Wanderers	H	W	4–1	Herd, Tilson 3	40,000	3rd
31	13 March	Huddersfield Town	H	W	3–0	Brook, Doherty 2	28,000	4th
32	20 March	Everton	A	D	1–1	Percival	32,000	7th
33	26 March	Liverpool	A	W	5–0	Herd, Brook 3, Doherty	32,000	4th
34	27 March	Bolton Wanderers	H	D	2–2	Herd, Doherty	52,000	4th
35	29 March	Liverpool	H	W	5–1	Herd 2, Brook, Tilson, Neilson	25,000	3rd
36	3 April	Brentford	A	W	6–2	Herd, Brook, Toseland, Tilson, Doherty 2	37,000	3rd
37	7 April	Brentford	H	W	2–1	Brook, Doherty	25,000	2nd
38	10 April	Arsenal	H	W	2–0	Toseland, Doherty	75,000	1st
39	14 April	Sunderland	A	W	3–1	Brook, Doherty 2	15,000	1st
40	17 April	Preston North End	A	W	5–2	Herd, Donnelly, Doherty 3	16,000	1st
41	24 April	Sheffield Wednesday	H	W	4–1	Brook 2, Tilson, Doherty	55,000	1st
42	1 May	Birmingham	A	D	2–2	Tilson, Doherty	25,000	1st

Note: game vs Brentford on 28 November abandoned after 40 minutes.

==== League table ====
Pos	Team	Pld	W	D	L	GF	GA	GAv	Pts
1	Manchester City (C)	42	22	13	7	107	61	1.754	57
2	Charlton Athletic	42	21	12	9	58	49	1.184	54
3	Arsenal	42	18	16	8	80	49	1.633	52
4	Derby County	42	21	7	14	96	90	1.067	49
5	Wolverhampton Wanderers	42	21	5	16	84	67	1.254	47

Source: World Football
Rules for classification: 1) Points; 2) Goal average; 3) Goals scored
(C) Champions

==== Results summary ====
Overall								Home						Away					
Pld	W	D	L	GF	GA	GAv	Pts	W	D	L	GF	GA	Pts	W	D	L	GF	GA	Pts
42	22	13	7	107	61	1.754	57	15	5	1	56	22	35	7	8	6	51	39	22

=== FA Cup ===
Round	Date	Opponents	Venue	Result	Score GF–GA	Goalscorers	Attendance
3	16 January	Wrexham	A	W	3–1	Herd, Tilson, Brook	21,000
4	30 January	Accrington Stanley	H	W	2–0	Tilson, Doherty	39,000
5	20 February	Bolton Wanderers	A	W	5–0	Herd 2, Doherty, Brook, Tilson	61,000
6	6 March	Millwall	A	L	0–2		42,000

== Player details ==
		League		FA Cup		Total	
Pos	Name	Apps	Goals	Apps	Goals	Apps	Goals
GK	(England) Frank Swift	42		4		46	
DF	(England) Billy Dale	36		3		39	
DF	(England) Gordon Clark	13		1		14	
DF	(England) Sam Barkas	30		4		34	
DF	(England) Bobby Marshall	40		4		44	
DF	(Scotland) Bob Donnelly	5	1			5	1
DF	(England) Dick Neilson	2	1			2	1
MF	(England) Jack Percival	42	1	3		45	1
MF	(England) Jackie Bray	40	2	4		44	2
MF	Joe Rogers	2		1		3	
MF	(Northern Ireland) Keiller McCullough	2				2	
FW	(England) Ernie Toseland	42	7	4		46	7
FW	(Scotland) Alec Herd	32	15	4	3	36	18
FW	(England) Jimmy Heale	10	6			10	6
FW	(Scotland) Colin Rodger	9	7			9	7
FW	(England) Fred Tilson	23	15	4	3	27	18
FW	(Northern Ireland) Peter Doherty	41	30	4	2	45	32
FW	(England) Eric Brook	42	20	4	2	46	22
FW	Bobby Regan	4				4	
FW	John McLeod	3	2			3	2
FW	Jim Cassidy	1				1	
FW	Raymond Freeman	1				1	

== See also ==
- List of Manchester City F.C. seasons
