= List of Manchester City F.C. records and statistics =

This article lists various statistics related to Manchester City Football Club.

== Club honours ==
Best performances in competitions entered
Competition	Best result	Championship	Runners-up
Premier League/First Division (L1)	Winners	10	7
First Division/Second Division (L2)	Winners	7	4
Second Division (L3)	Third place	0	0
FA Cup	Winners	8	7
EFL Cup/Football League Cup	Winners	9	1
Full Members' Cup	Runners-up	0	1
Football League Trophy	First round	0	0
FA Community Shield/FA Charity Shield	Winners	7	10
UEFA Champions League/European Cup	Winners	1	1
UEFA Europa League/UEFA Cup	Quarter-finals	0	0
European Cup Winners' Cup	Winners	1	0
UEFA Super Cup	Winners	1	0
FIFA Club World Cup	Winners	1	0

- Premier League/First Division (highest tier) (Note: Up until 1992, the top division of English football was the Football League First Division; since then, it has been the FA Premier League. At the same time, the Second Division was renamed the First Division, and the Third Division was renamed the Second Division.)
  - Winners (10): 1936–37, 1967–68, 2011–12, 2013–14, 2017–18, 2018–19, 2020–21, 2021–22, 2022–23, 2023–24
  - Runners-up (7): 1903–04, 1920–21, 1976–77, 2012–13, 2014–15, 2019–20, 2025–26
- First Division/Second Division (second tier)
  - Winners (8): 1898–99, 1902–03, 1909–10, 1927–28, 1946–47, 1965–66, 2001–02
  - Runners-up (4): 1895–96, 1950–51, 1988–89, 1999–2000
  - Promoted third place (1): 1984–85
- Second Division (third tier)
  - (Best) Promoted third place (1): 1998–99
- FA Cup
  - Winners (8): 1903–04, 1933–34, 1955–56, 1968–69, 2010–11, 2018–19, 2022–23, 2025–26
  - Runners-up (7): 1925–26, 1932–33, 1954–55, 1980–81, 2012–13, 2023–24, 2024–25
- EFL Cup/Football League Cup
  - Winners (9): 1969–70, 1975–76, 2013–14, 2015–16, 2017–18, 2018–19, 2019–20, 2020–21, 2025–26
  - Runners-up (1): 1973–74
- Full Members' Cup
  - (Best) Runners-up (1): 1985–86
- FA Community Shield/FA Charity Shield
  - Winners (7): 1937, 1968, 1972, 2012, 2018, 2019, 2024
  - Runners-up (10): 1934, 1956, 1969, 1973, 2011, 2014, 2021, 2022, 2023, 2026
- UEFA Champions League/European Cup
  - Winners (1): 2022–23
  - Runners-up (1): 2020–21
- UEFA Europa League/UEFA Cup
  - (Best) Quarter-finals (2): 1978–79, 2008–09
- European Cup Winners' Cup
  - Winners (1): 1969–70
- UEFA Super Cup
  - Winners (1): 2023
- FIFA Club World Cup
  - Winners (1): 2023
- IFFHS The World's Club Team of the Year
  - Winners (1): 2023
- Ballon D'Or Club of the Year
  - Winners (2): 2022, 2023
- BBC Sports Team of the Year Award
  - Winners (1): 2023

== Competitive record ==
The table that follows is accurate as of the end of the 2025–26 season for all competitions. It excludes war competitions and league performances prior to City's joining the English football league in 1892.

Competition	T	Part	Pld	W	D	L	Win %	GF	GA	GD	Pts
National
Football League First Division (Pre 1992)	2	68	2,772	1,061	677	1,034	38.27	4,317	4,242	+75	2,837
Premier League	8	29	1,114	573	239	302	51.44	1,997	1,214	+782	1,958
Football League Second Division	7	26	973	489	213	271	50.26	1,919	1,286	+633	1,360
Football League Third Division	0	1	46	22	16	8	47.83	69	33	+36	82
FA Cup	8	123	392	212	67	113	54.08	780	469	+311	–
Football League Cup / EFL Cup	9	66	242	143	37	62	58.05	482	255	+227	–
FA Charity Shield / FA Community Shield	7	17	17	6	2	9	35.29	19	21	-2	–
International
European Cup / UEFA Champions League	1	16	149	82	29	38	55.03	307	176	+131	–
UEFA Cup / UEFA Europa League	0	8	52	28	13	11	53.85	84	51	+33	–
European Cup Winners' Cup / UEFA Cup Winners' Cup	1	2	18	11	2	5	61.11	32	13	+19	–
European Super Cup / UEFA Super Cup	1	1	1	0	1	0	0	1	1	0	–
FIFA Club World Cup	1	2	6	5	0	1	83.30	23	6	+17	–
Total	46	360	5,782	2,632	1,296	1,854	45.52	10,030	7,767	+2263	6,237

== Current first-team squad statistics ==
N	Pos.	Nat.	Name	Age	Since	App	Goals	Assists	CS	Ends	Fee	Notes
1	GK	(Italy)	Gianluigi Donnarumma (VC)	27	2025	59	0	0	22	2030	£26.0m	
3	DF	(Portugal)	Rúben Dias (Capt)	29	2020	271	6	6	–	2029	£62m	
5	MF	(England)	Elliot Anderson	24	2026	16	2	2	–	2031	£116m	
6	DF	(England)	Marc Guéhi (VC)	26	2026 (Jan)	35	3	2	–	2031	£20m	
7	FW	(Senegal)	Iliman Ndiaye	26	2026	12	0	4	–	2031	£65m	
8	MF	(Croatia)	Mateo Kovačić	32	2023	105	11	6	–	2027	£25m	
9	FW	(Norway)	Erling Haaland (VC)	26	2022	213	176	29	–	2034	£51.2m	
10	MF	(France)	Rayan Cherki	23	2025	73	18	19	–	2030	£34.0m	
11	FW	(Belgium)	Jérémy Doku	24	2023	143	23	31	–	2031	£55.4m	
13	GK	(England)	Marcus Bettinelli	34	2025	0	0	0	0	2027	Free Transfer	
17	MF	(Argentina)	Enzo Fernández	25	2026	14	2	1	–	2032	£125m	Record signing
21	DF	(Algeria)	Rayan Aït-Nouri	25	2025	35	0	8	–	2030	£36.3m	
22	DF	(Brazil)	Vitor Reis	20	2025 (Jan)	8	1	0	–	2029	£29.6m	
24	DF	(Croatia)	Joško Gvardiol	24	2023	137	14	11	–	2031	£77.5m	
27	DF	(Portugal)	Matheus Nunes	28	2023	130	5	23	–	2028	£53.0m	
28	GK	(Argentina)	Gerónimo Rulli	34	2026	2	0	0	1	2028	£1.7m	
32	MF	(Morocco)	Ayyoub Bouaddi	19	2026	10	0	2	–	2031	£85.6m	
33	MF	(England)	Nico O'Reilly	21	2024	88	14	9	–	2030	–	Academy graduate
37	FW	(Brazil)	Allan	22	2026	7	1	1	–	2031	£32m	
42	FW	(Ghana)	Antoine Semenyo	26	2026 (Jan)	37	13	6	–	2031	£64m	
45	DF	(Uzbekistan)	Abdukodir Khusanov	22	2025 (Jan)	60	1	0	–	2031	£33.6m	
47	MF	(England)	Phil Foden	26	2017	383	114	70	–	2030	–	Academy graduate
56	FW	(England)	Ryan McAidoo	18	2025	8	2	1	–	2030	–	Academy graduate
61	DF	(England)	Kaden Braithwaite	18	2025	4	0	0	–	2030	–	Academy graduate
75	MF	(France)	Floyd Samba	17	2026	3	2	0	–	2031	–	Academy graduate
82	DF	(England)	Rico Lewis	22	2022	122	7	14	–	2030	–	Academy graduate

Updated to match played 21 November 2026
Source: FBRef, Manchester City website,

rdered by squad number.
Appearances include league and cup appearances, including as substitute.
Includes EDS players who train regularly with the first team, having made at least one previous league appearance.

== Club records ==
=== Matches ===
- First competitive match – Ardwick 12–0 Liverpool Stanley, FA Cup (4 October 1890)
- First FA Cup match – Ardwick 12–0 Liverpool Stanley, QF Round 1 (4 October 1890)
- First Football Alliance match – Ardwick 3–3 Bootle (12 September 1891)
- First Football League match – Ardwick 7–0 Bootle (3 September 1892)
- First First Division match – Blackburn Rovers 4–3 Manchester City (2 September 1899)
- First League Cup match – Manchester City 3–0 Stockport County, second round (18 October 1960)
- First European match – Manchester City 0–0 Fenerbahce, European Cup first round (18 September 1968)
- Record league victory – 11–3 vs Lincoln City (23 March 1895, most goals scored); 10–0 vs Darwen (18 February 1899, widest margin of victory)
- Record FA Cup victory – 12–0 vs Liverpool Stanley (4 October 1890)
- Record European victory – 7–0 vs Schalke 04, UEFA Champions League round of 16 second leg (12 March 2019); 7–0 vs RB Leipzig, UEFA Champions League round of 16 second leg (14 March 2023)
- Record league defeat – 0–8 vs Burton Wanderers (26 December 1894); 0–8 vs Wolverhampton Wanderers (23 December 1933); 1–9 vs Everton (3 September 1906); 2–10 vs Small Heath (17 March 1893)
- Record FA Cup defeat – 0–6 vs Preston North End (30 January 1897); 2–8 vs Bradford Park Avenue (30 January 1946)
- Record European defeat – 0–4 vs Barcelona, UEFA Champions League group stage, 19 October 2016

=== Streaks ===
==== Winning runs ====
- Longest winning run in all competitions: 21, 19 December 2020 – 2 March 2021 (all games won over 90 minutes), (national record)
- Longest league winning run: 18, 26 August 2017 – 27 December 2017, (joint national record)
- Longest league winning run from the start of a calendar year: 13, 3 January 2021 – 2 March 2021, (national record)
- Longest run of games without going behind in the Premier League: 19, 28 November 2020 – 2 March 2021, (joint national record)
- Longest winning run in the FA Cup: 11, 8 January 2023 – 20 April 2024
- Longest winning run in the League Cup: 16, 20 September 2017 – 7 January 2020 (including penalty shoot-out wins)
- Longest winning run at home in the FA Cup: 18, 1 March 2017 – 4 April 2026 (on-going), (competition record)
- Most consecutive home wins (all competitions): 23, 8 January 2023 – 7 November 2023, (Premier League record)
- Most consecutive away wins (all competitions): 20, 19 December 2020 – 14 May 2021, (national record)
- Most consecutive home league game wins: 20, 5 March 2011 – 21 March 2012
- Most consecutive away league game wins: 12, 19 December 2020 – 14 May 2021, (national record)

===== UEFA competitions =====
- Longest consecutive winning run in UEFA competitions: 10, 17 May 2023 – 6 March 2024, (national record)
- Most UEFA Champions League consecutive home game wins: 12, 9 March 2022 – 6 March 2024
- Most UEFA Champions League game wins in a single season: 11, 2020–21, (national record)

==== Unbeaten runs ====
- Longest unbeaten run (all competitions): 35, 10 December 2023 – 19 May 2024
- Longest unbeaten home run (all competitions): 52, 22 December 2022 – 26 October 2024
- Longest unbeaten away run (all competitions): 23, 25 November 2020 – 14 May 2021
- Longest league unbeaten run: 32, 10 December 2023 – 26 October 2024
- Longest league unbeaten home run: 37, 28 December 2010 – 1 December 2012
- Longest league unbeaten away run: 22, 11 September 2021 – 17 September 2022

===== UEFA competitions =====
- Longest unbeaten run in UEFA Competitions: 27, 6 September 2022 – 23 October 2024, (national record)
- Longest unbeaten run in the UEFA Champions League: 26, 6 September 2022 – 23 October 2024, (competition record)
- Longest unbeaten home run in the UEFA Champions League: 34, 7 November 2018 – 29 January 2025, (national record)
- Longest unbeaten away run in the UEFA Champions League: 12, 6 September 2022 – 1 October 2024

==== Winless runs ====
- Longest winless run: 18, 26 December 1979 – 7 April 1980
- Longest home winless run: 9, 26 December 1979 – 7 April 1980
- Longest away winless run: 34, 11 February 1986 – 17 October 1987
- Longest winless run in the UEFA Champions League: 6, 18 September 2012 – 4 December 2012

==== Draws ====
- Most consecutive draws: 6, 5 April 1913 – 6 September 1913
- Most consecutive home draws: 6, 18 October 1924 – 20 December 1924
- Most consecutive away draws: 7, 9 September 1990 – 24 November 1990
- Most consecutive league draws: 7, 5 October 2009 – 28 October 2009

==== Losses ====
- Most consecutive defeats: 8, 23 August 1995 – 14 October 1995
- Most consecutive home defeats: 5, 5 December 1987 – 23 January 1988
- Most consecutive away defeats: 14, 5 November 1892 – 13 January 1894

=== Seasonal ===
Records are only for completed league seasons and exclude war seasons.

==== Most ====
- Most goals scored in a season (all competitions): 169, 2018–19, (national record)
- Most home goals scored in a season (all competitions): 100, 2018–19; 2022–23
- Most league goals scored in a season: 108, 1926–27; 2001–02
- Most goals scored in a Premier League season: 106, 2017–18, (national record)
- Most goals scored in a Premier League calendar year: 113, 2021, (national record)
- Most league goals conceded in a season: 102, 1962–63
- Most Premier League goals conceded in a season: 65, 2000–01
- Most points in a league season (2 points per win): 62, 1946–47 Second Division
- Most points in a league season (3 points per win): 100, 2017–18 Premier League, (top-tier national record)
- Most league game wins in a season: 32, 2017–18; 2018–19, (national record)
- Most league game wins in a calendar year: 36, 2021, (top-tier national record)
- Most away league game wins in a calendar year: 19, 2021, (top-tier national record)
- Most home league game wins in a season: 19, 1920–21; 2001–02
- Most away league game wins in a season: 16, 2017–18
- Most league draws in a season: 18, 1993–94
- Most league defeats in a season: 22, 1958–59; 1959–60; 1997–98
- Most Premier League defeats in a season: 21, 2005–06

==== Least ====
- Fewest league goals scored in a season: 29, 2006–07
- Fewest league goals conceded in a season: 23, 2018–19
- Fewest points in a league season (2 points per win): 18, 1892–93 Second Division
- Fewest points in a league season (3 points per win): 34, 2000–01 Premier League
- Fewest league game wins in a season: 8, 1893–94; 1949–50; 1986–87; 2000–01
- Fewest league game draws in a season: 2, 1893–94; 2018–19
- Fewest league game defeats in a season: 2, 2017–18

=== Internationals ===
- Most international caps (total while at club): 96 – Bernardo Silva, Portugal
- Most international goals (total while at club) 48 – Erling Haaland, Norway

=== Attendances ===
- Highest home attendance: 84,569 vs Stoke City, Maine Road, FA Cup, 3 March 1934, (national record) (Note: Record for any English club outside of games at Wembley Stadium.)
- Lowest home attendance: 1,000 vs Burton, Hyde Road, Second Division, 11 September 1893

=== Firsts ===
- First team to achieve automatic promotion in the Football League (1898–99)
- First team to get promoted and win a major honour in successive seasons (1903–04)
- First team from the Greater Manchester region to win a major honour (1903–04)
- First team (with Everton), to wear numbered shirts (1933 FA Cup final)
- First team to go unbeaten after New Year in the First Division (1936–37)
- First and only team to get relegated as First Division/Premier League champions (1937–38)
- First and only team to both score and concede 100 goals in a First Division/Premier League season (1957–58)
- First English team to achieve a major domestic and European trophy in the same season (1969–70)
- First team to have won the First Division, FA Cup, Football League Cup and a European trophy (1969–70)
- First English team to win four different major trophies (1969–70)
- First team to win the First Division, FA Cup and Football League Cup in successive seasons (1967–68 to 1969–70)
- First and only team to win all four major domestic trophies and a European trophy within three seasons (First Division, FA Cup, League Cup, European Cup Winners’ Cup and Charity Shield) (1969–70)
- First European-trophy-winning English team to get relegated to the third tier (1997–98)
- First team to achieve 100 points in an English top-flight season (2017–18)
- First English team to achieve the domestic treble (2018–19)
- First team to win four consecutive English top-flight titles (2020–21 to 2023–24)
- First team to reach eight consecutive FA Cup semi-finals (2018–19 to 2025–26)
- First team to reach four consecutive FA Cup finals (2022–23 to 2025–26)

=== Penalty shoot-out record ===
Overall record

Shoot-outs	Won	Lost	Pens for	Pens against	Diff	Win %
20	14	6	75	65	+10	70%

Individual shoot-outs

Season	Date	Competition	Round	Opponent	Venue	Result	Score	City manager
1981–82	28 October 1981	League Cup	Second round	Stoke City	Away	Won	9–8	(England) John Bond
1985–86	4 November 1985	Full Members' Cup	Semi-finals	Sunderland	Home	Won	4–2	(Scotland) Billy McNeill
1997–98	26 August 1997	League Cup	First round	Blackpool	Home	Lost	2–4	(England) Frank Clark
1998–99	30 May 1999	Second Division play-offs	Final	Gillingham	Neutral	Won	3–1	(England) Joe Royle
2005–06	21 September 2005	League Cup	First round	Doncaster Rovers	Away	Lost	0–3	(England) Stuart Pearce
2008–09	28 August 2008	UEFA Cup	Second qualifying round	Midtjylland	Away	Won	4–2	(Wales) Mark Hughes
2008–09	24 September 2008	League Cup	Second round	Brighton & Hove Albion	Away	Lost	3–5	(Wales) Mark Hughes
2008–09	19 March 2009	UEFA Cup	Round of 16	Aalborg	Away	Won	4–3	(Wales) Mark Hughes
2015–16	28 February 2016	League Cup	Final	Liverpool	Neutral	Won	3–1	(Chile) Manuel Pellegrini
2017–18	24 October 2017	EFL Cup	Fourth round	Wolverhampton Wanderers	Home	Won	4–1	(Spain) Pep Guardiola
2017–18	19 December 2017	EFL Cup	Quarter-finals	Leicester City	Away	Won	4–3	(Spain) Pep Guardiola
2018–19	18 December 2018	EFL Cup	Quarter-finals	Leicester City	Away	Won	3–1	(Spain) Pep Guardiola
2018–19	24 February 2019	EFL Cup	Final	Chelsea	Neutral	Won	4–3	(Spain) Pep Guardiola
2019–20	4 August 2019	FA Community Shield		Liverpool	Neutral	Won	5–4	(Spain) Pep Guardiola
2021–22	27 October 2021	EFL Cup	Fourth round	West Ham United	Away	Lost	3–5	(Spain) Pep Guardiola
2023–24	6 August 2023	FA Community Shield		Arsenal	Neutral	Lost	1–4	(Spain) Pep Guardiola
2023–24	16 August 2023	UEFA Super Cup		Sevilla	Neutral	Won	5–4	(Spain) Pep Guardiola
2023–24	17 April 2024	UEFA Champions League	Quarter-finals	Real Madrid	Home	Lost	3–4	(Spain) Pep Guardiola
2024–25	10 August 2024	FA Community Shield		Manchester United	Neutral	Won	7–6	(Spain) Pep Guardiola
2026–27	28 October 2026	EFL Cup	Fourth round	Brighton and Hove Albion	Home	Won	4–3	(Italy) Enzo Meresca

== Player awards ==
=== Player of the Year ===
Each season since the end of the 1966–67 season, the members of the Manchester City Official Supporters Club have voted by ballot to choose the player on the team they feel is the worthiest of recognition for his performances during that season. The following table lists all of the recipients of this award since 2000.

Year	Winner
2000–01	(Australia) Danny Tiatto
2001–02	(Algeria) Ali Benarbia
2002–03	(France) Sylvain Distin
2003–04	(England) Shaun Wright-Phillips
2004–05	(Republic of Ireland) Richard Dunne
2005–06	(Republic of Ireland) Richard Dunne
2006–07	(Republic of Ireland) Richard Dunne
2007–08	(Republic of Ireland) Richard Dunne
2008–09	(Republic of Ireland) Stephen Ireland
2009–10	(Argentina) Carlos Tevez

Year	Winner
2010–11	(Belgium) Vincent Kompany
2011–12	(Argentina) Sergio Agüero
2012–13	(Argentina) Pablo Zabaleta
2013–14	(Ivory Coast) Yaya Touré
2014–15	(Argentina) Sergio Agüero
2015–16	(Belgium) Kevin De Bruyne
2016–17	(Spain) David Silva
2017–18	(Belgium) Kevin De Bruyne
2018–19	(Portugal) Bernardo Silva
2019–20	(Belgium) Kevin De Bruyne

Year	Winner
2020–21	(Portugal) Rúben Dias
2021–22	(Belgium) Kevin De Bruyne
2022–23	(Norway) Erling Haaland
2023–24	(England) Phil Foden
2024–25	(Croatia) Joško Gvardiol
2025–26	(England) Nico O'Reilly

=== Players with the most Player of the Year awards ===
Rank	Player	Nationality	Years	Titles
1	Kevin De Bruyne	Belgium	2015–2025	4
1	Richard Dunne	Ireland	2000–2009	4
3	Joe Corrigan	England	1967–1983	3
4	Sergio Agüero	Argentina	2011–2021	2
4	Tony Coton	England	1990–1996	2
4	Neil McNab	Scotland	1983–1990	2
4	Georgi Kinkladze	Georgia	1995–1998	2
4	Mike Summerbee	England	1965–1975	2
4	Paul Power	England	1975–1986	2
4	Mike Doyle	England	1967–1978	2

Source: they actually qualified for UEFA champions League

== Players' individual awards while at Manchester City ==
=== European or international award winners ===
- Ballon d'Or (1):
  - (Spain) Rodri in 2024
- Yashin Trophy (1):
  - (Italy) Gianluigi Donnarumma in 2025
- FIFA World Cup Golden Ball (1):
  - (Spain) Rodri in 2026
- FIFA Club World Cup Golden Ball (1):
  - (Spain) Rodri in 2023
- FIFA Club World Cup Silver Ball (1):
  - (England) Kyle Walker in 2023
- UEFA European Championship Player of the Tournament (1):
  - (Spain) Rodri in 2024
- The Best FIFA Goalkeeper (2):
  - (Brazil) Ederson in 2023
  - (Italy) Gianluigi Donnarumma in 2025
- UEFA Men's Player of the Year Award (1):
  - (Norway) Erling Haaland in 2022–23
- European Golden Shoe (1):
  - (Norway) Erling Haaland (2022–23, 36 goals in 35 games, 72 points)
- Ballon d'Or Striker of the Year / Gerd Müller Trophy (1):
  - (Norway) Erling Haaland in 2023
- FIFPRO World 11 (18):
  - (Belgium) Kevin De Bruyne in 2020, 2021, 2022, 2023, 2024
  - (Norway) Erling Haaland in 2022, 2023, 2024, 2026
  - (Portugal) Rúben Dias in 2021, 2023
  - (Portugal) João Cancelo in 2022
  - (Portugal) Bernardo Silva in 2023
  - (England) Kyle Walker in 2023
  - (England) John Stones in 2023
  - (Spain) Rodri in 2024
  - (Brazil) Ederson in 2024
  - (Italy) Gianluigi Donnarumma in 2025
- Best FIFA Men's 11 (4):
  - (Portugal) Rúben Dias in 2024
  - (Spain) Rodri in 2024
  - (Norway) Erling Haaland in 2024
  - (Italy) Gianluigi Donnarumma in 2025
- FIFA World Cup All-Star Team / Team of the Tournament (3):
  - (Belgium) Kevin De Bruyne in 2018
  - (Spain) Rodri in 2026
  - (Norway) Erling Haaland in 2026
- UEFA Club Football Awards (3):
  - (Belgium) Kevin De Bruyne in 2019–20 (Best Midfielder)
  - (Portugal) Rúben Dias in 2020–21 (Best Defender)
  - (Spain) Rodri in 2022–23 (Champions League Player of the Season)
- UEFA Team of the Year (3):
  - (Belgium) Kevin De Bruyne in 2017, 2019, 2020
- UEFA Champions League Team / Squad of the Season (20):
  - 6 awards: (Belgium) Kevin De Bruyne
  - 2 awards: (Portugal) Rúben Dias, (England) Raheem Sterling and (England) Phil Foden
  - 1 award: 8 players
- IFFHS Men's World Team (18):
  - (Belgium) Kevin De Bruyne in 2017, 2019, 2020, 2021, 2022. 2023
  - (Portugal) Bernardo Silva in 2019
  - (Portugal) Rúben Dias in 2021, 2023, 2024
  - (Norway) Erling Haaland in 2022, 2023, 2024, 2025
  - (Brazil) Ederson in 2023
  - (Spain) Rodri in 2023, 2024
  - (Italy) Gianluigi Donnarumma in 2025
- IFFHS World's Best Player (2):
  - (Norway) Erling Haaland in 2023
  - (Spain) Rodri in 2024
- IFFHS World's Best Playmaker (3):
  - (Belgium) Kevin De Bruyne in 2020, 2021, 2023
- IFFHS World's Best Goalkeeper (2):
  - (Brazil) Ederson in 2023
  - (Italy) Gianluigi Donnarumma in 2025
- IFFHS World's Best Central Left Midfielder (1):
  - (Belgium) Kevin De Bruyne in 2020
- IFFHS UEFA Team of the Decade (1):
  - (Belgium) Kevin De Bruyne for 2011–2020
- IFFHS CONMEBOL Team of the Decade (1):
  - (Argentina) Sergio Agüero for 2011–2020
- IFFHS CAF Team of the Decade (2):
  - (Algeria) Riyad Mahrez for 2011–2020
  - (Ivory Coast) Yaya Touré for 2011–2020
- ESM Team of the Season (16):
  - (Belgium) Kevin De Bruyne in 2017–18, 2019–20, 2020–21, 2021–22, 2022–23
  - (Portugal) João Cancelo in 2020–21, 2021–22
  - (Belgium) Vincent Kompany in 2011–12
  - (Ivory Coast) Yaya Touré in 2013–14
  - (Argentina) Nicolás Otamendi and (Spain) David Silva in 2017–18
  - (Portugal) Rúben Dias, (England) John Stones and (Germany) İlkay Gündoğan in 2020–21
  - (Portugal) Bernardo Silva in 2021–22
  - (Norway) Erling Haaland in 2022–23
- BBC Sports Personality World Sport Star of the Year (1)
  - (Norway) Erling Haaland in 2023

=== First Division or Premier League awards winners ===
- PFA Players' Player of the Year (4):
  - (Belgium) Kevin De Bruyne in 2019–20 and 2020–21
  - (Norway) Erling Haaland in 2022–23
  - (England) Phil Foden in 2023–24
- PFA Young Player of the Year (6):
  - (England) Peter Barnes in 1975–76
  - (Germany) Leroy Sané in 2017–18
  - (England) Raheem Sterling in 2018–19
  - (England) Phil Foden in 2020–21 and 2021–22
  - (England) Nico O'Reilly in 2025–26
- Premier League Player of the Season (6):
  - (Belgium) Vincent Kompany in 2011–12
  - (Belgium) Kevin De Bruyne in 2019–20 and 2021–22
  - (Portugal) Rúben Dias in 2020–21
  - (Norway) Erling Haaland in 2022–23
  - (England) Phil Foden in 2023–24
- Premier League Young Player of the Season (4):
  - (England) Phil Foden in 2020–21 and 2021–22
  - (Norway) Erling Haaland in 2022–23
  - (England) Nico O'Reilly in 2025–26
- FWA Footballer of the Year (7):
  - (England) Don Revie in 1954–55
  - (Germany) Bert Trautmann in 1955–56
  - (England) Tony Book in 1968–69
  - (England) Raheem Sterling in 2018–19
  - (Portugal) Rúben Dias in 2020–21
  - (Norway) Erling Haaland in 2022–23
  - (England) Phil Foden in 2023–24
- Premier League Golden Boot or previous First Division equivalent (7):
  - (England) Frank Roberts: 1 (31 goals, 1924–25)
  - (England) Francis Lee: 1 (33 goals, 1971–72)
  - (Argentina) Carlos Tevez: 1 (20 goals, 2010–11)
  - (Argentina) Sergio Agüero: 1 (26 goals, 2014–15)
  - (Norway) Erling Haaland: 3 (36 goals, 2022–23; 27 goals, 2023–24; 27 goals, 2025–26)
- Premier League Playmaker of the Season (3):
  - (Belgium) Kevin De Bruyne: 3 (16 assists, 2017–18; 20 assists, 2019–20; 16 assists, 2022–23)
- Premier League Golden Glove (7):
  - (England) Joe Hart: 4 (18 clean sheets, 2010–11; 17 clean sheets, 2011–12; 18 clean sheets, 2012–13; 14 clean sheets, 2014–15)
  - (Brazil) Ederson: 3 (16 clean sheets, 2019–20; 19 clean sheets, 2020–21; 20 clean sheets, 2021–22)
- PFA Team of the Year (51) (First Division or Premier League only)
  - 5 awards: (Belgium) Kevin De Bruyne
  - 3 awards: (Belgium) Vincent Kompany, (Spain) David Silva and (Norway) Erling Haaland
  - 2 awards: 9 players
  - 1 award: 19 players
- Premier League Player of the Month (at least 2 awards won):
  - (Argentina) Sergio Agüero: 7, shared most in the Premier League (October 2013, November 2014, January 2016, April 2016, January 2018, February 2019, January 2020)
  - (Norway) Erling Haaland: 4 (August 2022, April 2023, August 2024, September 2025)
  - (England) Raheem Sterling: 3 (August 2016, November 2018, December 2021)
  - (Germany) İlkay Gündoğan: 2 (January 2021, February 2021)
- Premier League Goal of the Month (at least 2 awards won):
  - (Belgium) Kevin De Bruyne: 2 (November 2019, July 2020)

=== Players with the most titles won at the club ===
As of 16 May 2026

Players with equal number of titles are ranked in alphabetical order.

Rank	Player	Nationality	Years	Premier League	FA Cup	League Cup	Community Shield	Continental	Titles
1	Bernardo Silva	Portugal	2017–2026	6	3	5	3	3	20
1	Phil Foden	England	2017–	6	3	5	3	3	20
1	John Stones	England	2016–2026	6	3	5	3	3	20
3	Kevin De Bruyne	Belgium	2015–2025	6	2	5	3	3	19
5	Ederson	Brazil	2017–2025	6	2	4	3	3	18
5	Kyle Walker	England	2017–2025	6	2	4	3	3	18
7	Sergio Agüero	Argentina	2011–2021	5	1	6	3	0	15
7	Aymeric Laporte	Spain	2018–2023	5	2	4	2	2	15
9	İlkay Gündoğan	Germany	2016–2023; 2024–2025	5	2	4	2	1	14
10	Fernandinho	Brazil	2013–2022	5	1	6	1	0	13
10	Rodri	Spain	2019–2026	4	2	3	1	3	13
10	David Silva	Spain	2010–2020	4	2	5	2	0	13

== Player records ==
=== Appearances ===
- Youngest player: Glyn Pardoe, **15 years, 314 days** (against Birmingham City, First Division, 11 April 1962)
- Oldest player: Billy Meredith, **49 years, 245 days** (against Newcastle United, FA Cup semi-final, 29 March 1924)

==== All-time appearances ====
This table lists the top ten Manchester City players with the most appearances for the club (minimum 445 appearances).
Figures out of brackets are match starts and in brackets are additional substitute appearances.
Columns are sorted and ranked in order of total (start + sub) appearances
Names in bold are players who are still at the club at present.

As of 24 May 2026

Rank	Player	Years	League	FA Cup	League Cup	Europe / Worldwide	Other (Note: Includes appearances in the Charity Shield/Community Shield, Test Matches and the now-defunct Anglo-Italian Cup, Anglo-Scottish Cup, Full Members' Cup and Texaco Cup. Wartime matches excluded.)	Total
1	(England) Alan Oakes	1959–1976	564	41	47	17	11	**680**
2	(England) Joe Corrigan	1967–1983	476	37	52	27	11	**603**
3	(England) Mike Doyle	1967–1978	448	44	43	23	12	**570**
4	(Germany) Bert Trautmann	1949–1964	508	33	4	0	0	**545**
5	(England) Colin Bell	1966–1979	394	34	40	24	9	**501**
6	(England) Eric Brook	1928–1939	450	41	0	0	2	**493** (Note: Brook also played three games in the 1939–40 season, which were expunged from the records following the outbreak of the Second World War.)
7	(England) Tommy Booth	1968–1981	382	27	46	25	11	**491**
8	(Portugal) Bernardo Silva	2017–2026	304	36	23	91	6	**460**
9	(England) Mike Summerbee	1965–1975	357	34	36	16	9	**452**
10	(England) Paul Power	1975–1986	365	28	38	8	6	**445**

==== Appearances in continental competitions ====
As of match played 4 November 2026.

Rank	Player	Nationality	Years	UCL	UEL	USC	FCWC	Total
1	Bernardo Silva	Portugal	2017–2026	86	0	0	5	91
2	Ederson	Brazil	2017–2025	76	0	1	5	82
3	İlkay Gündoğan	Germany	2016–2023; 2024–2025	77	0	0	4	81
4	**Phil Foden**	England	2017–	70	0	1	6	77
5	Fernandinho	Brazil	2013–2022	75	0	0	0	75
6	Kevin De Bruyne	Belgium	2015–2025	73	0	0	0	73
7	David Silva	Spain	2010–2020	56	14	0	0	70
8	Sergio Agüero	Argentina	2011–2021	65	4	0	0	69
9	Raheem Sterling	England	2015–2022	68	0	0	0	68
10	John Stones	England	2016–2026	64	0	0	2	66

=== Goalscorers ===
==== All-time top goalscorers ====
As of 4 November 2026.

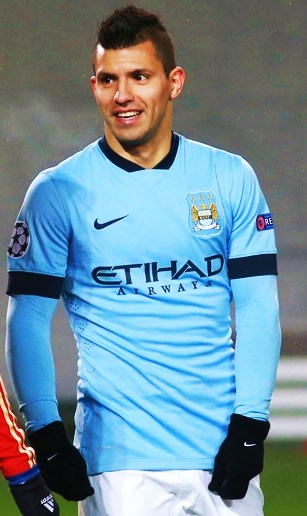
Sergio Agüero, pictured in 2014, is Manchester City's all-time record goalscorer, with 260 goals in all competitions.

Rank	Player	Nationality	Years	League	Domestic Cups	Continental	Other (Note: Includes goals scored in the FA Charity Shield, FA Community Shield, Texaco Trophy and Anglo-Italian Cup.)	Goals
1	Sergio Agüero	Argentina	2011–2021	184	31	43	2	260
2	Eric Brook	England	1927–1940	158	19	0	0	177
3	**Erling Haaland**	Norway	2022–	121	13	42	0	176
4	Tommy Johnson	England	1920–1930	158	8	0	0	166
5	Colin Bell	England	1966–1979	117	27	8	1	153
6	Joe Hayes	England	1953–1965	142	10	0	0	152
6	Billy Meredith	Wales	1894–1906; 1921–1924	146	5	0	1	152
8	Francis Lee	England	1967–1974	112	21	10	5	148
9	Tommy Browell	England	1913–1926	122	17	0	0	139
10	Billie Gillespie	Scotland	1897–1905	126	6	0	0	132
10	Fred Tilson	England	1927–1938	110	22	0	0	132

- Most goals scored in all competitions: **260** – Sergio Agüero (2011–21).
- Most goals scored in one season in all competitions: **52** – Erling Haaland (2022–23) **(most by a Premier League player)**
- Most consecutive matches scored in (all competitions): **10** – Erling Haaland, 21 August 2022 – 8 October 2022.
- Most matches scored in Manchester City history: **186** – Sergio Agüero (2011–21).
- Most braces in Manchester City history: **37** – Sergio Agüero (2011–21).
- Most hat-tricks scored for Manchester City: **16** – Sergio Agüero (2011–21).
- Most hat-tricks in one season: **6** – Erling Haaland (in 2022–23).
- Most goals scored in a match in any competition: **6** – Denis Law v Luton Town, 28 January 1961.
- Youngest goalscorer in all competitions: Rony Lopes scored 5 January 2013 vs Watford (in FA Cup 3rd round) aged **17 years 8 days**

==== All-time top goalscorers in league football ====
As of 24 October 2026.

Rank	Player	Nationality	Years	Tier 1 (Note: First Division, Premier League)	Tier 2 (Note: Second Division, Division One, Championship)	Goals
1	Sergio Agüero	Argentina	2011–2021	184	0	184
2	Eric Brook	England	1927–1940	145	13	158
2	Tommy Johnson	England	1920–1930	114	44	158
4	Billy Meredith	Wales	1894–1906; 1921–1924	49	97	146
5	Joe Hayes	England	1953–1965	142	0	142
6	Billie Gillespie	Scotland	1897–1905	57	69	126
7	Tommy Browell	England	1913–1926	122	0	122
8	**Erling Haaland**	Norway	2022–	121	0	121
9	Colin Bell	England	1966–1979	113	4	117
10	Francis Lee	England	1967–1974	112	0	112

- Most goals scored in First Division / Premier League: **184** – Sergio Agüero (2011–21).
- Most goals scored in one First Division season: **38** – Tommy Johnson (1928–29).
- Most goals scored in one Premier League season: **36** – Erling Haaland (2022–23) **(record for most Premier League goals in a season)**
- Most consecutive Premier League matches scored in: **7** – Sergio Agüero (12 May 2019 – 21 September 2019) and Erling Haaland (21 August 2022 – 8 October 2022).
- Most home goals in one Premier League season: **22** – Erling Haaland (2022–23)
- Most away goals in one Premier League season: **14** – Erling Haaland (2022–23)
- Most Premier League matches scored in while playing for Manchester City: **131** – Sergio Agüero (2011–21).
- Most Premier League matches scored in during a single season: **23** – Erling Haaland (2022–23)
- Most home matches scored in one Premier League season: **12** – Erling Haaland (2022–23)
- Most away matches scored in one Premier League season: **11** – Erling Haaland (2022–23)
- Most braces scored in Premier League: **26** – Sergio Agüero (2011–21).
- Most Premier League braces in one season: **7** – Erling Haaland (2025–26)
- Most hat-tricks scored in the Premier League: **12** – Sergio Agüero (2011–21) **(national record)**.
- Most Premier League hat-tricks in one season: **4** – Erling Haaland (in 2022–23)
- Most poker or haul (4 goals in match) in Premier League games: **2** – Sergio Agüero (v. Tottenham Hotspur, 2014–15) and (v. Leicester City, 2017–18) .
- Most goals scored in one Premier League match: **5** – Sergio Agüero (v. Newcastle United, 2015–16).
- Most home goals scored in club history in Premier League: **109** – Sergio Agüero (2011–21).
- Most away goals scored in club history in Premier League: **74** – Sergio Agüero (2011–21).
- Most penalties scored in Premier League: **27** – Sergio Agüero (2011–21).
- Youngest league goalscorer: Ian Thompstone - scored 9 April 1988 vs. Middlesbrough aged **17 years 83 days**.
- Youngest Premier League goalscorer: Micah Richards - scored on 30 September 2006 vs. Everton aged **18 years 98 days**.

==== All-time top goalscorers in continental competitions ====
As of 4 November 2026.

In this table "Others" refer to historical and defunct continental competitions such as the Cup Winners' Cup, Anglo-Italian Cup with no current equivalent competition.
Goals scored in the old European Cup and UEFA Cup are included in the Champions League and Europa League columns respectively.

Rank	Player	Nationality	Years	UCL	UEL	FCWC	Others	Total
1	Sergio Agüero	Argentina	2011–2021	39 (Note: Includes 3 goals scored in the preliminary rounds of the Champions League)	4	0	0	43
2	**Erling Haaland**	Norway	2022–	39	0	3	0	42
3	**Phil Foden**	England	2017–	23	0	4	0	27
4	Raheem Sterling	England	2015–2022	24	0	0	0	24
5	Gabriel Jesus	Brazil	2017–2022	20	0	0	0	21
6	Bernardo Silva	Portugal	2017–2026	15	0	2	0	17
7	Kevin De Bruyne	Belgium	2015–2025	16	0	0	0	16
7	Riyad Mahrez	Algeria	2018–2023	16	0	0	0	16
9	Francis Lee	England	1968–1975	0	0	0	11	11
9	David Silva	Spain	2010–2020	9	2	0	0	11

- Most goals scored in European competitions: **43** – Sergio Agüero
- Most goals scored in the UEFA Champions League: **39** – Sergio Agüero
  - Most goals scored in the play-off round: **3** – Sergio Agüero
  - Most goals scored in the group stage: **27** – Sergio Agüero
  - Most goals scored in the knockout phase: **13** – Kevin De Bruyne
  - Most goals scored in a single season: **12** – Erling Haaland (2022–23)
  - Most hat-tricks scored: **3** – Sergio Agüero (2011–2021)
  - Most hat-tricks in a single season: **2** – Sergio Agüero (in 2016–17)
  - Most goals scored in a single match: **5** – Erling Haaland (2022–23)
- Most goals scored in the UEFA Super Cup: **1** – Cole Palmer
- Most goals scored in the FIFA Club World Cup: **4** – Phil Foden
  - Most goals scored in the FIFA Club World Cup final: **2** – Julián Alvarez
- Youngest scorer in European competitions: Tony Towers – scored on 18 March 1970 vs. Academica Coimbra (European Cup Winners Cup), aged **17 years 339 days**
- Youngest scorer in the UEFA Champions League: Rico Lewis – scored on 2 November 2022 vs. Sevilla, aged **17 years 346 days**

==== All-time top goalscorers in knockout phases of continental competitions ====
As of 17 March 2026.

Rank	Player	Nationality	Years	UCL	UEL	FCWC	Total
1	Sergio Agüero	Argentina	2011–2021	9	4	0	13
1	Kevin De Bruyne	Belgium	2015–2025	13	0	0	13
1	Bernardo Silva	Portugal	2017–2026	12	0	1	13
4	**Erling Haaland**	Norway	2022–	11	0	1	12
5	**Phil Foden**	England	2017–	7	0	1	8
6	Gabriel Jesus	Brazil	2017–2022	7	0	0	7
6	Riyad Mahrez	Algeria	2018–2023	7	0	0	7
6	Raheem Sterling	England	2015–2022	7	0	0	7
9	İlkay Gündoğan	Germany	2016–2023; 2024–2025	4	0	0	4
9	Leroy Sané	Germany	2016–2020	4	0	0	4
10	David Silva	Spain	2010–2020	1	2	0	3

- Most goals scored in knockout phases: **13** – Sergio Agüero and Kevin De Bruyne
- Most goals scored in the UCL round of 16 playoff: **2** – Erling Haaland
- Most goals scored in the UCL round of 16: **8** – Sergio Agüero
- Most goals scored in the UCL quarter-finals: **6** – Kevin De Bruyne
- Most goals scored in the UCL semi-finals: **4** – Riyad Mahrez
- Most goals scored in the UCL final: **1** – Rodri

===== Hat-tricks in UEFA competitions =====
Statistics correct as of 14 March 2023.

Key
^{4}	Player scored four goals
^{5}	Player scored five goals
()	Number of times player scored a hat-trick (only for players with multiple hat-tricks)

Player	Against	Result	Date	Competition
(Spain) Álvaro Negredo	(Russia) CSKA Moscow	5–2 (H)	5 November 2013	UEFA Champions League
(Argentina) Sergio Agüero (1)	(Germany) Bayern Munich	3–2 (H)	25 November 2014	UEFA Champions League
(Argentina) Sergio Agüero (2)	(Romania) Steaua București	0–5 (A)	16 August 2016	UEFA Champions League
(Argentina) Sergio Agüero (3)	(Germany) Borussia Mönchengladbach	4–0 (H)	14 September 2016	UEFA Champions League
(Brazil) Gabriel Jesus (1)	(Ukraine) Shakhtar Donetsk	6–0 (H)	7 November 2018	UEFA Champions League
(England) Raheem Sterling	(Italy) Atalanta	5–1 (H)	22 October 2019	UEFA Champions League
(Brazil) Gabriel Jesus (2)	(Croatia) Dinamo Zagreb	1–4 (A)	11 December 2019	UEFA Champions League
(Norway) Erling Haaland^{5}	(Germany) RB Leipzig	7–0 (H)	14 March 2023	UEFA Champions League
(England) Phil Foden	(Greece) AEK Athens	5–1 (H)	20 October 2026	UEFA Champions League

==== All-time top goalscorers in English cup competitions ====
As of 24 September 2025

Rank	Player	Nationality	Years	FA Cup	League Cup	Community Shield	Other	Total
1	Sergio Agüero	Argentina	2011–2021	20	11	2	0	33
2	Colin Bell	England	1966–1979	9	18	1	0	28
3	Francis Lee	England	1967–1974	7	14	3	0	24
4	Fred Tilson	England	1928–1938	22	0	0	0	22
5	Denis Tueart	England	1974–1978; 1980–1983	3	18	0	0	21
6	Eric Brook	England	1927–1940	19	0	0	0	19
6	Kevin De Bruyne	Belgium	2015–2025	9	10	0	0	19
6	Riyad Mahrez	Algeria	2018–2023	11	8	0	0	19
6	Mike Summerbee	England	1965–1975	11	8	0	0	19
10	**Phil Foden**	England	2017–	12	6	0	0	18
10	Shaun Goater	Bermuda	1998–2003	9	9	0	0	18
10	Alec Herd	Scotland	1933–1948	17	0	1	0	18

- Most goals scored in all domestic cup competitions: **33** – Sergio Agüero.
- Most goals scored in the FA Cup: **22** – Fred Tilson.
- Most FA Cup goals in a season: **9** – Frank Roberts (1925–26).
- Most goals scored in FA Cup finals: **2** – Raheem Sterling (2019), Gabriel Jesus (2019), İlkay Gündoğan (2023).
- Most goals scored in the League Cup: **18** – Colin Bell, Denis Tueart.
- Most League Cup goals in a season: **8** – Denis Tueart (1975–76).
- Most goals scored in one League Cup match: **4** – Gabriel Jesus vs. Burton Albion (2018–19)
- Most goals scored in League Cup finals: **2** – Sergio Agüero (2018 and 2020) and Nico O'Reilly (2026).
- Most goals scored in the Community Shield: **3** – Francis Lee (1968 and 1972).
- Youngest goalscorer in domestic cup competitions post 1946: Rony Lopes scored 5 January 2013 vs Watford (FA Cup) aged **17 years 8 days**

==== Manchester City top goalscorers in a single season (all competitive matches) ====
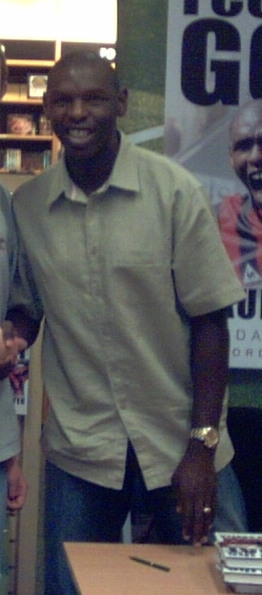
Shaun Goater made 211 appearances for Manchester City between 1998 and 2003, scoring 103 goals. In the 2001–02 season, he scored 32 goals which made him one of only seven players to score 30+ goals in a single season since the Second World War.

This table lists players who have scored more than 32 goals in a single season. Ordered by goals scored and by season.
Bold denotes an active player for the club.

Rank	Player	Goals	Season	League	Domestic Cups	Continental
1	**(Norway) Erling Haaland**	52	2022–23	36	4	12
2	**(Norway) Erling Haaland**	38	2023–24	27	5	6
2	**(Norway) Erling Haaland**	38	2025–26	27	3	8
2	(England) Tommy Johnson	38	1928–29	38	0	0
5	(England) Derek Kevan	36	1963–64	30†	6	0
6	(England) Francis Lee	35	1971–72	33	2	0
7	**(Norway) Erling Haaland**	34	2024–25	22	1	11
8	(Argentina) Sergio Agüero	33	2016–17	20	5	8
9	(England) Frank Roberts	32	1924–25	31	1	0
9	(Scotland) Dave Halliday	32	1931–32	28	4	0
9	(Republic of Ireland) Peter Doherty	32	1936–37	30	2	0
9	(Scotland) Alex Harley	32	1962–63	23	9	0
9	(Bermuda) Shaun Goater	32	2001–02	28†	4	0
9	(Argentina) Sergio Agüero	32	2014–15	26	0	6
9	(Argentina) Sergio Agüero	32	2018–19	21	5	6

Last updated: 19 May 2026.
Source: James, Gary (2006). Manchester City – The Complete Record. Derby: Breedon. ISBN 1-85983-512-0.; fbref.com

League goals are all scored in the English top tier division (First Division or Premier League) and Continental goals are all scored in the UEFA Champions League unless otherwise indicated.

Key
† - scored in second tier (Second Division / Division One / Championship).

=== Assists ===
Note: Assist data has only been recorded by the Premier League and Opta since 1992–93

- Most assists in all competitions: **176** – Kevin De Bruyne
- Most assists in Premier League: **119** – Kevin De Bruyne
- Most assists in UEFA competitions: **29** – Kevin De Bruyne
- Most assists in all competitions in one season: **29** – Kevin De Bruyne in 2022–23
- Most assists in a Premier League season: **20** – Kevin De Bruyne in 2019–20
- Most assists in a Premier League match: **4** – Jérémy Doku (vs. Bournemouth, 4 November 2023)
- Most assists in a UEFA competition season: **7** – Kevin De Bruyne, in the 2022–23 UEFA Champions League
- Most assists in a UEFA competition match: **3** – Kevin De Bruyne (vs. Tottenham Hotspur, UEFA Champions League, 17 April 2019) and João Cancelo (vs. Club Brugge, UEFA Champions League, 3 November 2021)
- Most Premier League assists by a goalkeeper: **7** – Ederson

==== Most assists in all competitions ====
Statistics correct as of 28 October 2026. Bold denotes an active player for the club.

Rank	Player	Years	Assists
1	(Belgium) Kevin De Bruyne	2015–2025	176
2	(Spain) David Silva	2010–2020	122
3	(Portugal) Bernardo Silva	2017–2026	77
4	(England) Raheem Sterling	2015–2022	74
5	(England) **Phil Foden**	2017–	70
6	(Argentina) Sergio Agüero	2011–2021	63
7	(Algeria) Riyad Mahrez	2018–2023	55
8	(Germany) İlkay Gündoğan	2016–2023; 2024–2025	45
9	(Brazil) Gabriel Jesus	2017–2022	41
9	(Germany) Leroy Sané	2016–2020	41
9	(Ivory Coast) Yaya Touré	2010–2018	41

==== Most assists in the Premier League ====
Statistics correct as of 28 August 2026. Bold denotes an active player for the club.

Rank	Player	Years	Assists
1	(Belgium) Kevin De Bruyne	2015–2025	118
2	(Spain) David Silva	2010–2020	93
3	(Portugal) Bernardo Silva	2017–2026	50
4	(Argentina) Sergio Agüero	2011–2021	47
5	(England) Raheem Sterling	2015–2022	43
6	(England) **Phil Foden**	2017–	36
7	(Algeria) Riyad Mahrez	2018–2023	34
7	(Ivory Coast) Yaya Touré	2010–2018	32
9	(France) Samir Nasri	2011–2017	30
10	(Brazil) Gabriel Jesus	2017–2022	29

==== Most assists in UEFA and FIFA club competitions ====
Statistics correct as of 20 October 2026. Bold denotes an active player for the club.

Rank	Player	Years	Assists
1	(Belgium) Kevin De Bruyne	2015–2025	29
2	(England) Raheem Sterling	2015–2022	19
3	(England) **Phil Foden**	2017–	17
4	(Algeria) Riyad Mahrez	2018–2023	14
5	(Spain) David Silva	2010–2020	12
6	(Portugal) Bernardo Silva	2017–2026	11
6	(Germany) İlkay Gündoğan	2016–2023; 2024–2025	11
8	(Argentina) Sergio Agüero	2011–2021	9
9	(Portugal) João Cancelo	2019–2023	8
9	(Germany) Leroy Sané	2016–2020	8

=== Clean sheets ===
- Most clean sheets in one season: **33** in **61** matches, 2018–19
- Most clean sheets by an individual goalkeeper in one season: **29**, Joe Hart, 2010–11
- Most clean sheets by an individual goalkeeper: **185**, Joe Corrigan (1967–1983)
- Most Premier League Golden Glove awards: **4**, Joe Hart
- Most consecutive Premier League Golden Glove awards: **3**, Joe Hart (2010–11, 2011–12, 2012–13), Ederson (2019–20, 2020–21, 2021–22)
- Most clean sheets overall in the Premier League: **122**, Ederson (2017–2025)
- Most Premier League clean sheets by an individual goalkeeper in one season: **20**, Ederson, 2018–19 (38 matches) and 2021–22 (37 matches)
- Most clean sheets overall in the UEFA Champions League: **28**, Ederson (2017–2025)
- Most consecutive clean sheets in the UEFA Champions League: **7**, 27 October 2020 – 16 March 2021
- Most consecutive clean sheets in all competitions during a season: **6**, 25 November 2020 – 12 December 2020
- Most consecutive league clean sheets during a season: **6**, 15 September 2018 – 29 October 2018 and 13 January 2021 – 3 February 2021
- Longest run without a clean sheet: **14** matches, 15 December 2004 – 9 April 2005

==== Most clean sheets in all competitions ====
Statistics correct as of 30 June 2025. Bold denotes an active player for the club.

Rank	Player	Years	Clean sheets	Games played	Percentage
1	(England) Joe Corrigan	1967–1983	185	602	30.7
2	(Brazil) Ederson	2017–2025	160	372	43.0
3	(England) Joe Hart	2006–2017	137	348	39.3
4	(England) Frank Swift	1933–1949	102	338	30.1
5	(Germany) Bert Trautmann	1949–1964	98	545	17.9
6	(England) Nicky Weaver	1997–2007	71	207	34.3
7	(England) Charlie Williams	1894–1902	66	232	28.4
8	(England) Jim Goodchild	1911–1926	61	217	28.1
8	(England) Harry Dowd	1961–1970	61	219	27.9
10	(England) Tony Coton	1990–1995	55	195	28.2

=== Captaincy ===
==== Club captains ====
Note: Other players (vice-captains) have led the team on the pitch when the club captain is not playing. Other players have been made captain on a one off basis to celebrate or commemorate an event. E.g. Oleksandr Zinchenko captained the team in their 2021–22 FA Cup fifth round tie at Peterborough United in support of his opposition to the Russian invasion of Ukraine.

- Total number of club captains: **39** players
- Longest serving captains: **8** seasons,

(Wales) Lot Jones (1906–1914),
(Belgium) Vincent Kompany (2011–2019)

- Shortest serving captains: **1** season, 15 players

==== Club captains since 2000 ====
Dates	Captain
1999–2000	(Scotland) Andy Morrison
2000–2001	(Norway) Alf-Inge Haaland
2001–2002	(England) Stuart Pearce
2002–2003	(Algeria) Ali Benarbia
2003–2006	(France) Sylvain Distin
2006–2009	(Republic of Ireland) Richard Dunne
2009–2010	(Ivory Coast) Kolo Touré
2010–2011	(Argentina) Carlos Tevez
2011–2019	(Belgium) Vincent Kompany
2019–2020	(Spain) David Silva
2020–2022	(Brazil) Fernandinho
2022–2023	(Germany) İlkay Gündoğan
2023–2025	(England) Kyle Walker
2025–2025	(Belgium) Kevin De Bruyne
2025–2026	(Portugal) Bernardo Silva
2026–	(Portugal) Rúben Dias

== Transfers ==
Many transfers have undisclosed fees, and thus transfer fees are not accurate. Where players have signed/left on undisclosed fees, a reference is given for the estimated transfer fee from a reputable source. The fees include potential add-ons where stated.

=== Highest transfer fees paid ===
Rank	Player	From	Fee	Year
1	(Argentina) Enzo Fernández	(England) Chelsea	£125m	2026
2	(England) Elliot Anderson	(England) Nottingham Forest	£116m	2026
3	(England) Jack Grealish	(England) Aston Villa	£100m	2021
4	(Morocco) Ayyoub Bouaddi	(France) Lille	£85.6m (Note: Fee widely reported as £81.4 million initially with up to £4.2 million with add-ons)	2026
5	(Croatia) Joško Gvardiol	(Germany) RB Leipzig	£77.5m	2023
6	(Ghana) Antoine Semenyo	(England) Bournemouth	£65m	2026
7	(Senegal) Iliman Ndiaye	(England) Everton	£65m	2026
8	(Spain) Rodri	(Spain) Atlético Madrid	£63.6m	2019
9	(Portugal) Rúben Dias	(Portugal) Benfica	£62m	2020
10	(Algeria) Riyad Mahrez	(England) Leicester City	£60m	2018
10	(Portugal) João Cancelo	(Italy) Juventus	£60m	2019

=== Highest transfer fees received ===
Rank	Player	To	Fee	Year
1	(Brazil) Savinho	(England) Tottenham Hotspur	£85.0m (Note: Fee widely reported as £75.0 million initially with up to £10.0 million with add-ons)	2026
2	(Argentina) Julián Alvarez	(Spain) Atlético Madrid	£81.5m (Note: Fee widely reported as £64.4 million initially with up to £17.1 million with add-ons)	2024
3	(Spain) Rodri	(Spain) Barcelona	£65.4m	2026
4	(Netherlands) Tijjani Reijnders	(Saudi Arabia) Al Qadsiah	£52m	2026
4	(Spain) Nico González	(England) Newcastle United	£52m (Note: Initial fee of £48m with up to £4m of potential add-ons)	2026
6	(England) Raheem Sterling	(England) Chelsea	£47.5m	2022
7	(Spain) Ferran Torres	(Spain) Barcelona	£46.3m	2022
8	(Brazil) Gabriel Jesus	(England) Arsenal	£45.0m	2022
8	(England) James Trafford	(England) Leeds United	£45.0m	2026
10	(Germany) Leroy Sané	(Germany) Bayern Munich	£44.7m	2020

=== Progression of record transfer fee paid ===
Fee	Selling club	Transferred player	Transfer date	Notes
2p	Bolton Wanderers	(England) John Gunn	October 1896	Earliest recorded transfer fee
£250	Newton Heath	(Scotland) Joe Cassidy	April 1900	
£450	Glossop North End	(England) Irvine Thornley	April 1904	
£1,200	Norwich City	(Scotland) David Ross	February 1907	
£1,780	Everton	(England) Tommy Browell	October 1913	
£2,500	Derby County	(England) Horace Barnes	May 1914	
£3,400	Bolton Wanderers	(England) Frank Roberts	October 1922	
£4,700	Partick Thistle	(Scotland) Jimmy McMullan	February 1926	
£10,000	Blackpool	(Northern Ireland) Peter Doherty	February 1936	
£25,000	Swansea Town	(Wales) Roy Paul	July 1950	
£55,000	Huddersfield Town	(Scotland) Denis Law	March 1960	British record
£60,000	Bolton Wanderers	(England) Francis Lee	October 1967	
£200,000	Queens Park Rangers	(England) Rodney Marsh	March 1972	
£275,000	Sunderland	(England) Dennis Tueart	March 1974	
£275,000	Luton Town	(England) Paul Futcher	June 1978	
£765,000	Preston North End	(Republic of Ireland) Michael Robinson	September 1979	
£1,450,277	Wolverhampton Wanderers	(England) Steve Daley	5 September 1979	British record
£2.5m	Wimbledon	(England) Keith Curle	14 August 1991	
£3m	Portsmouth	(England) Lee Bradbury	30 July 1997	
£3.65m	West Ham United	(Costa Rica) Paulo Wanchope	9 August 2000	
£5m	Preston North End	(Republic of Ireland) Jon Macken	5 February 2002	
£13m	Paris Saint-Germain	(France) Nicolas Anelka	7 June 2002	
£19m	CSKA Moscow	(Brazil) Jô	2 July 2008	
£32.5m	Real Madrid	(Brazil) Robinho	1 September 2008	British record
£38m	Atlético Madrid	(Argentina) Sergio Agüero	28 July 2011	
£44m	Liverpool	(England) Raheem Sterling	14 July 2015	Record for an English player
£54m	VfL Wolfsburg	(Belgium) Kevin De Bruyne	30 August 2015	
£57m	Athletic Bilbao	(Spain) Aymeric Laporte	30 January 2018	
£60m	Leicester City	(Algeria) Riyad Mahrez	10 July 2018	
£62.8m	Atlético Madrid	(Spain) Rodri	4 July 2019	
£100m	Aston Villa	(England) Jack Grealish	5 August 2021	British record
£116m	Nottingham Forest	(England) Elliot Anderson	2 July 2026	Record for an English player
£125m	Chelsea	(Argentina) Enzo Fernández	1 September 2026	Joint British record

== Managerial records ==
- First full-time manager: (England) Frederick Hopkinson
- Most years as manager: 13 years – (Scotland) Les McDowall (1950–1963)
- Most titles won as manager: 20 – (Spain) Pep Guardiola
- Most matches managed: 593 – (Spain) Pep Guardiola
- Most matches won as manager: 416 – (Spain) Pep Guardiola
- Most goals scored under manager: 1,423 – (Spain) Pep Guardiola
- Highest win percentage (at least one season in charge): 70.2% – (Spain) Pep Guardiola (2016–2026)
- Lowest win percentage (at least one season in charge): 25.0% – (England) Malcolm Allison (1979–1980)

=== Managers individual awards ===
- The Best FIFA Men's Coach (1):
  - (Spain) Pep Guardiola: 2023
- UEFA Men's Coach of the Year Award (1)
  - (Spain) Pep Guardiola: 2022–23
- IFFHS World's Best Club Coach Award (1)
  - (Spain) Pep Guardiola: 2023
- Premier League Manager of the Season (5)
  - (Spain) Pep Guardiola (5): 2017–18, 2018–19, 2020–21, 2022–23, 2023–24
- League Managers Association Awards (3)
  - (Spain) Pep Guardiola (3): 2018, 2021, 2023
- Premier League Manager of the Month (at least 2 awards won)
  - (Spain) Pep Guardiola (13): February 2017, September 2017, October 2017, November 2017, December 2017, February 2019, April 2019, January 2021, February 2021, November 2021, December 2021, February 2026, April 2026
  - (Chile) Manuel Pellegrini (4): December 2013, January 2014, December 2014, August 2015
  - (Italy) Roberto Mancini (2): December 2010, October 2011
  - (England) Stuart Pearce (2): April 2005, August 2005
- BBC Sports Personality of the Year Coach Award (1)
  - (Spain) Pep Guardiola: 2023

== International representatives ==
The following players represented their countries while playing for Manchester City. Many of these players also gained caps/goals while at other clubs. It excludes caps/goals earned by players while on loan from City to other clubs.
Figures for active players in bold
Last updated 17 November 2026

=== International honours won while playing at City ===
==== FIFA World Cup ====
The following players have won the FIFA World Cup while playing for Manchester City:

- (France) Benjamin Mendy – 2018
- (Argentina) Julián Alvarez – 2022
- (Spain) Rodri– 2026

==== FIFA Confederations Cup ====
The following players have won the FIFA Confederations Cup while playing for Manchester City:

- (Brazil) Elano, Robinho – 2009
- (Germany) Leroy Sané – 2017

==== UEFA European Championship ====
The following players have won the UEFA European Championship while playing for Manchester City:

- (Spain) David Silva – 2012
- (Spain) Rodri – 2024

==== UEFA Nations League ====
The following players have won the UEFA Nations League while playing for Manchester City:

- (Portugal) Bernardo Silva – 2019
- (Spain) Aymeric Laporte, Rodri – 2023
- (Portugal) Bernardo Silva, **Ruben Dias** – 2025

==== Copa América ====
The following players have won the Copa América while playing for Manchester City:

- (Brazil) Gabriel Jesus, Fernandinho, Ederson – 2019
- (Argentina) Sergio Agüero (Note: Agüero began the tournament as a City player, but his contract with the club ended prior to the final game, with him joining Barcelona) – 2021
- (Argentina) Julián Alvarez – 2024

==== Africa Cup of Nations ====
The following players have won the Africa Cup of Nations while playing for Manchester City:

- (Cameroon) Lucien Mettomo – 2002
- (Ivory Coast) Yaya Touré, Wilfried Bony (Note: Bony won the title with his country after he had signed for the club, but before he had made his City debut) – 2015
- (Algeria) Riyad Mahrez – 2019

==== CONCACAF Nations League ====
The following players have won the CONCACAF Nations League while playing for Manchester City:

- (United States) Zack Steffen – 2021

==== OFC Nations Cup ====
The following players have won the OFC Nations Cup while playing for Manchester City:

- (Australia) Danny Tiatto – 2000

=== International caps ===
The figure in brackets is the number of international caps gained while a Manchester City player. It excludes caps earned by players while on loan from City to other clubs. Players are listed in alphabetical order by country and by name.

Sources (where not otherwise indicated): for UEFA nations for other nations

Algeria

- **Rayan Aït-Nouri** (14)
- Djamel Belmadi (1)
- Riyad Mahrez (43)

Argentina

- Sergio Agüero (69)
- Julián Alvarez (26)
- Martín Demichelis (13)
- **Enzo Fernández** (5)
- Nicolás Otamendi (55)
- **Gerónimo Rulli** (1)
- Carlos Tevez (15)
- Pablo Zabaleta (52)

Australia

- Danny Tiatto (16)
- Alex Robertson* (2)

Belgium

- Dedryck Boyata (1)
- Kevin De Bruyne (78)
- **Jérémy Doku** (36)
- Geert De Vlieger* (1)
- Vincent Kompany (66)
- Émile Mpenza (2)

Bermuda

- Shaun Goater (1)

Bosnia and Herzegovina

- Edin Džeko (41)

Brazil

- **Allan** (1)
- Danilo (6)
- Ederson (29)
- Elano (19)
- Fernandinho (47)
- Gabriel Jesus (56)
- Jô (2)
- **Vitor Reis** (3)
- Robinho (25)
- Savinho (6)

Bulgaria

- Valeri Bojinov (1)
- Martin Petrov (17)

Cameroon

- Marc-Vivien Foé (4)
- Lucien Mettomo (14)

Chile

- Claudio Bravo (17)

China

- Sun Jihai (27)

Costa Rica

- Paulo Wanchope (24)

Croatia

- Vedran Ćorluka (16)
- **Joško Gvardiol** (36)
- **Mateo Kovačić** (27)

Denmark

- Niclas Jensen (17)

Ecuador

- Felipe Caicedo (16)

Egypt

- **Omar Marmoush** (19)

England

- **Elliot Anderson** (6)
- Billy Austin (1)
- Sam Barkas (5)
- Peter Barnes (14)
- Gareth Barry (23)
- Joey Barton (1)
- Colin Bell (48)
- Frank Booth (1)
- Jackie Bray (6)
- Wayne Bridge (4)
- Ivor Broadis (8)
- Eric Brook (18)
- Herbert Burgess (4)
- Mick Channon (1)
- Joe Corrigan (9)
- Sam Cowan (3)
- Keith Curle (3)
- Fabian Delph (14)
- Mike Doyle (5)
- **Phil Foden** (49)
- Trevor Francis (10)
- **Jack Grealish** (27)
- **Marc Guéhi** (15)
- Joe Hart (63)

England (continued)

- David James (13)
- Adam Johnson (12)
- Tommy Johnson (2)
- Francis Lee (27)
- Joleon Lescott (19)
- **Rico Lewis** (5)
- Rodney Marsh (8)
- Jimmy Meadows (1)
- James Milner (42)
- James Mitchell (1)
- **Kalvin Phillips** (8)
- **Nico O'Reilly** (13)
- Kevin Reeves (1)
- Don Revie (6)
- Micah Richards (13)
- Frank Roberts (4)
- Jack Rodwell (1)
- Joe Royle (6)
- Trevor Sinclair (1)
- Bert Sproston (1)
- Raheem Sterling (61)
- John Stones (80)
- Mike Summerbee (8)
- Frank Swift (19)
- Irvine Thornley (1)
- Fred Tilson (4)
- James Trafford (2)
- Dennis Tueart (6)
- Kyle Walker (66)
- David Watson (27)
- David White (1)
- Max Woosnam (1)
- Shaun Wright-Phillips (21)

Faroe Islands

- Gunnar Nielsen (6)

Finland

- Tomas Galvez* (3)
- Tuomas Haapala* (2)

France

- **Rayan Cherki** (18)
- Gaël Clichy (10)
- Eliaquim Mangala (5)
- Benjamin Mendy (6)
- Samir Nasri (18)
- Bacary Sagna (23)

Georgia

- Mikhail Kavelashvili (4)
- Georgi Kinkladze (13)
- Murtaz Shelia (4)
- Kakhaber Tskhadadze (2)

Germany

- Jérôme Boateng (3)
- İlkay Gündoğan (51)
- Leroy Sané (17)

Ghana

- **Antoine Semenyo** (6)

Greece

- Georgios Samaras (14)

Iceland

- Árni Gautur Arason (4)

Ireland and Republic of Ireland

- Gavin Bazunu* (2)
- Jimmy Conway (1)
- Greg Cunningham (2)
- Peter Doherty (6)
- Richard Dunne (47)
- Jimmy Elwood (1)
- Paddy Fagan (2)
- Shay Given (22)
- Mickey Hamill (1)
- Stephen Ireland (6)
- Paddy Kelly (1)
- Mark Kennedy (9)
- Alan Kernaghan (15)
- Jon Macken (1)
- Mick McCarthy (20)
- Keiller McCullough (3)
- Jimmy Mulligan (1)
- Terry Phelan (19)
- Niall Quinn (47)
- Billy Walsh (9)

Israel

- Tal Ben Haim (7)
- Eyal Berkovic (6)

Italy

- Mario Balotelli (15)
- **Gianluigi Donnarumma** (15)

Ivory Coast

- Wilfried Bony (12)
- Abdul Razak (5)
- Kolo Touré (20)
- Yaya Touré (26)

Kosovo

- Bersant Celina (3)
- Arijanet Muric (6)

Mexico

- Nery Castillo (1)

Montenegro

- Stevan Jovetić (10)
- Stefan Savić (9)

Morocco

- **Ayyoub Bouaddi** (3)

Netherlands

- Nathan Aké (49)
- Paul Bosvelt (6)
- Nigel de Jong (34)
- Tijjani Reijnders (12)

New Zealand

- Chris Killen (18)

Nigeria

- Kelechi Iheanacho (10)

Northern Ireland

- Shea Charles (8)
- Johnny Crossan (10)
- Gary Fleming (2)
- Kevin Horlock (27)
- Michael Hughes (4)
- Steve Lomas (18)
- Billy McAdams (5)
- Frank McCourt (6)
- Ryan McGivern (7)
- Sammy McIlroy (10)
- Martin O'Neill(1)
- Jeff Whitley (7)
- Jim Whitley (3)
- Tommy Wright (5)
- Billy Walsh (5)

Norway

- Oscar Bobb (16)
- Alf-Inge Haaland (1)
- **Erling Haaland** (40)
- Age Hareide (7)
- Abdisalam Ibrahim* (2)
- Kåre Ingebrigtsen (2)

Paraguay

- Roque Santa Cruz (19)

Portugal

- João Cancelo (29)
- **Rúben Dias** (68)
- **Matheus Nunes** (10)
- Bernardo Silva (96) (Note: most caps won by a City player while at the club)

Romania

- Costel Pantilimon (5)

Scotland

- Matt Busby (1)
- Paul Dickov (3)
- Willie Donachie (35)
- Asa Hartford (36)
- Bobby Johnstone (4)
- Denis Law (11)
- George Livingstone (1)
- Jimmy McLuckie (1)
- Jimmy McMullan (8)
- Jackie Plenderleith (1)
- George Stewart (2)

Senegal

- **Iliman Ndiaye** (3)

Serbia

- Aleksandar Kolarov (53)
- Matija Nastasić (15)

Slovakia

- Vladimír Weiss (6)

Spain

- Eric García (10)
- Javi García (1)
- Aymeric Laporte (20)
- Jesús Navas (7)
- Álvaro Negredo (7)
- Nolito (3)
- Rodri (63)
- David Silva (87)
- Ferran Torres (22)

Sweden

- John Guidetti (2)
- Andreas Isaksson (17)

Switzerland

- Manuel Akanji (28)
- Gelson Fernandes (17)

Thailand

- Teerasil Dangda* (1)
- Kiatprawut Saiwaeo* (1)
- Suree Sukha* (1)

Togo

- Emmanuel Adebayor (5)

Ukraine

- Oleksandr Zinchenko (41)

United States

- DaMarcus Beasley (1)
- Claudio Reyna (20)
- Zack Steffen (10)

Uzbekistan

- **Abdukodir Khusanov** (13)

Wales

- Craig Bellamy (5)
- Tommy Chapman (1)
- Roy Clarke (22)
- Gordon Davies (2)
- Joe Davies (1)
- Wyn Davies (3)
- Andy Dibble (1)
- Ched Evans (10)
- Bert Gray (5)
- Edwin Hughes (1)
- Emyr Huws* (1)
- Di Jones (2)
- Lot Jones (18)
- Billy Lewis (2)
- Billy Meredith (22)
- Rabbi Matondo* (1)
- Hugh Morris (1)
- Roy Paul (24)
- David Phillips (10)
- Cliff Sear (1)
- Matt Smith* (5)
- Kit Symons (9)
- Ben Thatcher (4)
- George Wynn (8)

Zimbabwe

- Benjani (1)

*Players with no first team appearances.

=== Most international goals ===
Players are listed in order of goals scored and by alphabetical order

Rank	Player	Nationality	Years played	Goals	Caps
1	**Erling Haaland**	(Norway)	2022–	48	40
2	David Silva	(Spain)	2010–2018	28	87
3	Sergio Agüero	(Argentina)	2011–2021	27	66
4	Edin Džeko	(Bosnia and Herzegovina)	2011–2015	25	41
5	Kevin De Bruyne	(Belgium)	2015–2025	23	78
6	Riyad Mahrez	(Algeria)	2018–2023	21	43
7	Raheem Sterling	(England)	2015–2022	18	61
8	İlkay Gündoğan	(Germany)	2016–2023	13	51
8	Gabriel Jesus	(Brazil)	2017–2022	13	56
8	Niall Quinn	(Republic of Ireland)	1990–1996	13	47
