= 1934 FA Charity Shield =

- Event: FA Charity Shield
Arsenal	Manchester City
4	0
- Date: 28 November 1934
- Venue: Highbury, London
- Attendance: 10,888

The 1934 FA Charity Shield was the 21st FA Charity Shield, a football match between the winners of the previous season's First Division and FA Cup competitions. The match was contested by league champions Arsenal and FA Cup winners Manchester City, and was played at Highbury, the home ground of Arsenal. Arsenal won the game, 4–0.

== Match details ==
28 November 1934

Arsenal	4–0	Manchester City
Birkett; Marshall; Drake; Bastin

Highbury, London
Attendance: 10,888

Arsenal	Manchester City

1	(England) Frank Moss
2	(England) George Male
3	(England) Eddie Hapgood (c)
4	(Scotland) Frank Hill
5	(England) Norman Sidey
6	(England) Wilf Copping
7	(England) Ralph Birkett
8	(Scotland) James Marshall
9	(England) Ted Drake
10	(Wales) Bob John
11	(England) Cliff Bastin
Manager: (England) George Allison

1	(England) Frank Swift
2	(England) Bill Dale
3	(England) Laurie Barnett
4	(Scotland) Matt Busby
5	(England) Sam Cowan (c)
6	(England) Jackie Bray
7	(England) Ernie Toseland
8	(Scotland) Jimmy McLuckie
9	(England) Fred Tilson
10	(England) Jimmy Heale
11	(England) Eric Brook
Manager: (England) Wilf Wild
