= Colin Rodger =

Scottish footballer

Personal information
- Full name: Charles Gordon Rodger
- Date of birth: 3 March 1909
- Place of birth: Ayr, Scotland
- Date of death: 26 May 1982 (aged 73)
- Place of death: Ayr, Scotland
- Position: Outside left

Youth career
- Craigview Athletic

Senior career*
Years	Team	Apps	(Gls)
1931–1936	Ayr United	81	(23)
1936–1938	Manchester City	19	(7)
1938–1939	Northampton Town	35	(4)
1939	Ipswich Town	0	(0)

International career
1935	Scottish League XI	1	(0)
- * Club domestic league appearances and goals

Charles Gordon "Colin" Rodger (3 March 1909 – 26 May 1982) was a Scottish footballer who played as an outside left.

Sometimes known as "Fally", he began his career in the Scottish Football League with Ayr United, where his form was solid enough for him to be selected for the Scottish Football League XI in October 1935. This drew further attention, and three months later he moved to England with Manchester City; he was a squad member as the club won the 1936–37 Football League title, but as he only made nine league appearances (contributing seven goals) it is not clear if he was awarded a medal.

After moving to Northampton Town (as part of a player exchange also involving Fred Tilson, Keillor McCullough and Maurice Dunkley who went the other way), Rodger's career was interrupted by the outbreak of World War II, during which he made guest appearances for several Scottish clubs including Partick Thistle, Dumbarton and Ayr United.
