= Eric Brook =

English footballer (1907–1965)

Personal information
- Date of birth: 27 November 1907
- Place of birth: Mexborough, England
- Date of death: 29 March 1965 (aged 57)
- Place of death: Wythenshawe, England
- Height: 5 ft 9 in (1.75 m)
- Position: Outside left

Youth career
- 1925–1926: Wath Athletic

Senior career*
| Years | Team | Apps | (Gls) |
| 1926–1928 | Barnsley | 78 | (18) |
| 1928–1939 | Manchester City | 450 | (158) |
| Total | | 528 | (176) |

International career
| 1929–1937 | England | 18 | (10) |
| 1934-1939 | The Football League XI | 7 | (?) |
| 1939 | FA XI | 7 | (?) |
| 1939 | → England (wartime) | 2 | (0) |
- * Club domestic league appearances and goals

Eric Fred Brook (27 November 1907 – 29 March 1965) was an English footballer who played in the outside left position. Brook was also an England international. He was a muscular player with 'one of the fiercest shots in pre-war football' and was a good penalty taker. Brook is regarded as one of Manchester City's and England's greatest ever players. He has been described 'as a brilliant roving forward for Manchester City and England' and 'one of the great names of British football'.

== Early life ==
Brook was born in the Yorkshire town of Mexborough in 1907. Brook began his football career, as an outside left, playing for local teams including Mexborough and Deame Valley Old Boys. Brook signed for Wath Athletic, who played in the Midland Football League, in 1925.

== Club career ==
=== Barnsley ===
Brook began his professional football career with nearby Barnsley in 1926. Brook has been described as an 'unorthodox' outside left 'with a licence to roam'. Brook treated the left wing as 'a home to look in on'. It was stated that Brook had a 'roving commission' and was 'often found in the centre of the field'. Brook would often take 'throw-ins on both sides of the field'. Brook could play anywhere on the pitch if the need required, including in goal. He replaced an injured goalkeeper on at least three occasions over the course of his career. One such game in which he played in goal was when Manchester City played Arsenal in February 1938. The then City goalkeeper Frank Swift claimed that 'before helping to tuck the blankets over me (on the stretcher) Brookie had pulled my jersey off-about two sizes too big for him- and was ready to keep goal'. Brook played 78 times for Barnsley and scored 18 goals. He was part of the Barnsley team that were runner-ups in the Sheffield & Hallamshire County Cup in 1926–27. He quickly became an ever present in the Barnsley team and was described as a young and clever outside-left. In a 1-3 defeat to Fulham in September 1927, Brook was described as 'easily the pick of the Barnsley forwards'. His performances provoked interest from teams in the First Division. In 1927, he was linked with possible moves to Middlesbrough and Newcastle United.

=== Manchester City ===
In 1928 Brook and teammate Fred Tilson were transferred to Manchester City for a combined fee of £6,000. Brook was described as 'on the small side' but 'a clever winger'. The pair made their debuts for City on 17 March in a 2–0 victory against Grimsby Town. Brook and Tilson joined a strong forward line at the club that included three England internationals in Tommy Johnson, Billy Austin and Frank Roberts. The team also included the England international centre half Sam Cowan and the Scotland captain Jimmy McMullan. Brook scored his first goal for his new team in a 5–3 victory against Clapton Orient. Frank Roberts scored a hat trick in this game. In his first season for Manchester City, Brook played 12 times and scored two goals, helping the team to earn promotion to the First Division. City defeated already promoted Leeds United 1-0 in April 1928 to secure promotion. City then defeated Southampton 6-1 to take them to the top of the division.

In the 1928–29 football season Brook made 42 appearances and scored 14 times. His teammate, Tommy Johnson, scored a club record of 38 league goals that season. Brook scored once, and Johnson scored five times, in a 6–2 defeat of Everton in September that season. In the 1929–30 football season Brook helped Manchester City to third in the league. The City team had been strengthened by the acquisition of the outside right Ernie Toseland and the wing half Matt Busby. Brook scored a brace in a 6–1 victory against Liverpool in October that season. Brook also scored in a 10–1 victory against Swindon Town in the fourth round of the 1929–30 FA Cup. City were defeated 2-1 by Hull City in the subsequent round. In the 1930–31 football season City bought the prolific Scottish centre forward Dave Halliday from Arsenal as a replacement for Tommy Johnson. Despite this, Brook was the club's top scorer that season with 16 goals, and was also the club's top scorer in 1935–36. He often played in the centre forward position for his club, roaming the pitch, which later drew comparisons with Don Revie and Nándor Hidegkuti in this position. In the 1931–32 season the City team, which now included the Scottish centre forward Alec Herd, managed to reach the semi-final of the FA Cup but were defeated by Arsenal by 1–0 with a goal from Brook's England teammate Cliff Bastin. Brook had scored a brace in a 6–1 demolition of Brentford in the fourth round of that year's competition. Greater success for Manchester City in the FA Cup would follow in subsequent seasons.

==== FA Cup winners ====
Brook played in consecutive FA Cup finals in the mid-1930s, collecting a winners medal on the second occasion. In the 1933 FA Cup Final he was part of the Manchester City team that was defeated three goals to nil by Everton, who were captained by his England teammate Dixie Dean. The Everton team also included former City player Tommy Johnson. Brook was in fine form in that year's competition, scoring twice in a 2–0 victory against Walsall in the fourth round and a hat-trick against Bolton Wanderers in a 4–2 victory in the fifth round. Brook also set up Tilson, to score City's fourth goal in the game against Bolton. Following the game against Bolton, Brook was described as 'one of the most dangerous wingers in the country'. Another journalist stated that Brook's hat trick demonstrated that he was the 'live wire in present football'. In the semi-final against Derby County he set up two goals in a 3–2 victory. For the first goal, he 'beat international full-back Cooper and centred for right winger Toseland to score from close range'. He then 'lobbed beautifully for Tilson to run between two defenders and head the second Brook was the first player to wear the number 12 shirt in an FA Cup final as Everton wore 1–11 and City wore 12–22. One journalist contended that 'if Manchester City had had five Eric Brooks in the forward line there might have hem very different story to tell the in the final'. Brook's performances in 1933 led to him being described as 'probably the strongest outside left in contemporary play, for he is as hard as nails'. Brook contended that to succeed at outside left, a player should use 'plenty of tricks' and be 'cunning, deceptive, speedy and accurate'.

In the 1934 FA Cup Final Brook set up the winning goal, which was scored by his friend Fred Tilson, to earn City a 2–1 victory over Portsmouth. City had defeated Blackburn Rovers 3-1 in the third round of that years FA Cup with the 'penetrative raiding and deadly shooting' of Brook (who scored once) and Toseland (who scored twice) key to victory. City defeated Hull City, Sheffield Wednesday and Stoke City in subsequent rounds to reach the final. Brook scored a 'wonder goal' in front of a record crowd of 84,569 against Stoke City in the sixth round of that year's competition. According to Gary James, 'many fans from the 1930s claimed it was the greatest City goal ever scored at Maine Road'. Brook had made 'a speculative lob' from the wing, which seemed to change direction in mid-flight, which curled past Stoke goalkeeper Roy John. Some claimed that Brook's lob was a cross, but those who knew Brook said it was the type of unconventional thing he would try. The FA Cup winning City team included goalkeeper Frank Swift and left half Jackie Bray, who would both emulate Brook by going on to appear for England. Swift fainted from nervous exhaustion just before the City team were about to ascend the steps at Wembley to collect the trophy and their winners medals. Swift elicited no sympathy from Brook who reportedly ordered him to 'Get up! There's a hundred thousand people here, we've just won the cup and you're making us look fools'. Arsenal defeated City to win the 1934 FA Charity Shield.

In the 1934–35 football season Brook scored 17 goals and City finished fourth in the league, ten points behind champions Arsenal. Brook scored a late equaliser in a 1–1 draw with Arsenal in February that season. Billy Meredith stated that 'never has a goal at Maine-road been greeted with more enthusiasm than that which marked Eric Brook's equalising point ten minutes from the finish or a vigorous 1-1 game with the Arsenal'. In the following season, Brook was Manchester City's top scorer with 13 goals. In a 3-0 victory against Sheffield Wednesday in November that season, one journalist commented that 'Brook took on the role of roving forward with a demoralising effect on the Wednesday defence'. Matt Busby and Sam Cowan had left the City team in this season but Sam Barkas had been brought in from Bradford City. City's forwards had had an unsuccessful season and the team finished ninth in the league. Peter Doherty was bought from Blackpool to address the lack of goals, for a then-club record of £10,000. Doherty had an immediate impact on the team. Doherty scored two goals and Brook scored a hat-trick as City defeated Bolton Wanderers 7–0 in March of that season.

==== League champions and relegation ====
Brook in training

In the 1936–37 football season Brook was an ever-present in the first Manchester City side to win the League Championship. Brook scored City's only goal in a 1–1 draw with Huddersfield Town in November that season. One journalist stated that Brook 'gave a wonderful exhibition' in the game 'hitting the moving ball with uncanny precision across the Town goal' and that 'no winger makes his centres so quickly, and no winger roams so much and to such good purport'. City went on an unbeaten run after Christmas, winning 14 times and drawing 6 games. Brook scored a hat-trick in a 5–0 victory against Liverpool in March that season (with Herd and Doherty scoring City's other goals). The championship was won at Maine Road with a 4–1 victory over Sheffield Wednesday. Brook scored the first of his two goals in this game with a 'sizzling drive' which was described by one report as 'not so much a goal as a piece of forked lightning'. Brook scored 20 goals in this season and was the club's second highest scorer behind Peter Doherty who scored 30. City's four pronged attack of Brook, Doherty, Herd and Tilson clocked up 80 goals between them that season. Brook was the highest scoring winger in the league that season. City defeated Sunderland 2–0 in the 1937 FA Charity Shield. In May 1937, Manchester City played a German XI and were defeated 3–2, with Brook scoring one of City's goals. Brook was described as having had a 'splendid game, roving all over the field'.

In the 1937–38 football season Brook was part of the City team that were relegated from the First Division despite scoring more goals than any other team. Brook scored 16 goals that season. In December 1937 Brook underwent an operation for acute appendicitis and returned to training at Manchester City within a month. In his absence, one journalist stated that 'the Maine Road club are finding his shoes amazingly hard to fill'. Brook returned to the team in a 1937–38 FA Cup third-round game, in which he starred (and scored once) in a 3–1 victory against Millwall. Eric Thompson of the Daily Mail stated that 'the amazing Eric Brook...with a couple of plasters on his side' reappeared 'as zestful as ever although only 46 days ago he was operated on for appendicitis'. City reached the quarter final that season but were ultimately defeated 3-2 by Aston Villa. Brook was unable to help his team win promotion from the Second Division in the 1938–39 football season. Brook scored a hat trick in a 4–3 victory against Nottingham Forest in November that season. After the game, Brook was described as 'a wonderful player' who 'has been a great asset to the City side'. In a 1–0 defeat to Sheffield United that season, one journalist praised Brook's enthusiasm stating that he was 'half-back, outside right, outside left and centre-forward just about rolled into one'. In another game that season, a 2–1 victory against Southampton, Brook scored City's equaliser via a penalty and was described as the 'Peter Pan of outside lefts', who despite being a veteran 'appeared to be forever playing the ball'.

Brook made his last appearance for Manchester City in the 1939–40 football season. He scored his last goal for City in a 6–1 victory against Wrexham in the Western Regional League in 1939, the Second World War having disrupted the normal league programme. In over eleven years with Manchester City, Brook scored 177 goals in 494 appearances. He was the all-time highest Manchester City goalscorer until his tally was equalled and then surpassed by Sergio Aguero in 2017. Before a Premier League match between City and Arsenal in November 2017, Aguero was presented with a prize for becoming City's record goalscorer by Mike Summerbee and Brook's daughter, Betty Cowgill. Brook retained the record for most league goals (158) for City (which he held with Tommy Johnson) until 2019. Aguero's hat-trick in a 6–0 victory against Chelsea in February 2019 put him on 160 league goals, surpassing both Brook and Johnson. Brook also held the record of having scored the most goals for England (10) of any Manchester City player. Francis Lee equalled this record when he scored his final goal for England in a 3–1 defeat to West Germany in 1972. Raheem Sterling equalled this record with his first goal and surpassed it with his second goal in a 6–0 defeat of Bulgaria in October 2019 (the two goals put Sterling on 12 goals for England overall, but he had only scored eleven of them when he was a City player). Only five players have appeared for Manchester City more times than Eric Brook: Alan Oakes, Joe Corrigan, Mike Doyle, Bert Trautmann and Colin Bell. Of the 158 league goals Brook scored for City, 145 were scored in the first division. The only left wingers to have scored more goals in the top flight of English football are Cliff Bastin who scored 150 and Grenville Morris who scored 153. The highest scoring right winger in the history of the top flight is Tom Finney who scored 164 goals for Preston North End in the top flight.

== International career ==
Brook's 'workmanlike' club form earned him a call up to the England team in 1929 and he made his first appearance for his nation against Ireland. His debut performance for England was described as 'decidedly promising'. Brook went on to play for England a total of 18 times, scoring 10 goals. He may have played more times for his country, but faced competition, primarily from Arsenal's Cliff Bastin (who received 21 caps), but also from others, such as Aston Villa's Eric Houghton (who received 7 caps), Sheffield Wednesday's Ellis Rimmer (who received 4 caps) and West Ham's Jimmy Ruffell (who received six caps) and Jackie Morton (who received one cap). However, the versatility of Brook and Bastin meant that they often played together for England, usually with Bastin playing in the inside left position (in a game against Scotland in 1935 Bastin played at inside right). When they played together, Brook and Bastin would interchange at will, switches which often confused opposition defences. Despite the rivalry, Brook and Bastin were in the latter's words 'always the greatest of friends'. The only players to have scored more goals for England, prior to the Second World War, who did not play in the centre forward or inside forward positions were Cliff Bastin and Charles Bambridge. Only twelve players in total scored more goals for England than Brook prior to the war. In addition to playing for England, Brook often competed in trial matches for the Rest of England against the national team.

In a 4–0 victory for England against Switzerland in May 1933 Brook played outside left in the first half and inside left in the second half (switching places with Bastin). Brook and Bastin were described as 'a brilliant wing that day'. In the 1934 British Home Championship, Brook scored in every one of England's matches. Brook scored the first goal in a 3–0 victory against Ireland which was 'smashed home with a terrific volley from point-blank range, from a Sammy Crooks pass'. Brook scored England's only goal, from a Crooks centre, in a 2–1 defeat to Wales. In a 3–0 victory against Scotland Brook set up Bastin to score England's first goal and scored England's second via a twenty-five yard free-kick. England came second that year to Wales. In a 4–1 victory against France in December 1933, Brook scored from a left-footed free-kick into the corner of the goal and also set up Tom Grosvenor to score England's fourth goal. Brook struck the ball from his free kick 'so hard that the ball rebounded from the net back on to the field'. Brook also scored once for the 'Rest of England' in a 7–1 victory in a trial match against the England team at Roker Park in March 1934. In Sunderland 'the scoreline became more popularly known as England 1 Sunderland 6' as six of the rest's goals were scored by Sunderland players. In a 2–1 defeat to Czechoslovakia, in May 1934, Brook was described as 'the pick of the English forwards'. In October 1934, Brook scored twice for The Football League XI in a 2–1 victory against the Scottish Football League XI.

Brook scores his first goal in the infamous Battle of Highbury game

In the same year, Brook was involved in the famous Battle of Highbury international against the world champions Italy. The England team had not competed in the 1934 FIFA World Cup and were considered, in England, to be the real world champions. Seven of the eleven who played for England that day played for Arsenal. Jack Barker purportedly commented to Brook before the game 'You've got to take off your hats to these Arsenal players. If one of us were to drop out, another Arsenal man would step in'. In the match Brook and Bastin caused the Italians 'an infinite amount of trouble by their passing and quick shooting'. Brook missed a penalty early in the match but redeemed himself by scoring two goals to help England to a 3–2 victory. He scored his first goal by heading the ball past Carlo Ceresoli after a precise cross from Stanley Matthews, and his second from a free kick which Matthews described as being like a 'thunderbolt'. Matthews remembered the game as the most violent in which he had been involved during his long career. Matthews stated that the behaviour of the Italians affected him, but that 'fortunately we had two real hard nuts in the England side that day in Eric Brook and Wilf Copping who started to dish out as good as they got and more'. Brook finished the first half with a shoulder injury while Ted Drake had two black eyes. According to Matthews, although Brook had been injured 'he continued to play manfully with his shoulder strapped up' One journalist stated that Brook was shamefully treated by the Italian players, who fouled him repeatedly, but that he had the self-control not to retaliate (at one point he raised a hand in anger but then dropped it). After the game, Brook 'returned to Manchester with his arm in a sling'. Brook is only one of four England players to have scored more than one goal in a game against Italy, the others being Mick Channon, Gerry Hitchens and Tom Finney.

In the 1935 British Home Championship Brook scored once and Tilson scored twice for England in a 4–0 victory against Wales at Ninian Park. England won the Home Championship that year despite suffering a 2–0 defeat against Scotland. Brook was one of three City players who appeared for England against Wales and then Ireland, the other two being Jackie Bray and Fred Tilson. This would not occur again until 1972 when Colin Bell, Francis Lee and Rodney Marsh all played for England against West Germany. The record was surpassed in 2010 when six Manchester City players (Joe Hart, Joleon Lescott, Gareth Barry, James Milner, Shaun Wright-Phillips and Adam Johnson) appeared in a 3–1 victory against Switzerland. Brook also scored for the Rest of England in a trial match against the national team in March 1935.

In the 1936 British Home Championship, Brook, Ralph Birkett and Tilson each scored in a 3–1 victory over Ireland at Windsor Park. In the game against Scotland, Brook was part of an England forward line which included Sammy Crooks, Bobby Barclay, George Camsell and Cliff Bastin. The result was a 1–1 draw, which meant that Scotland won the championship that season. In the same year, Brook scored in the 6–2 demolition of Hungary. Brook replaced Stoke City's Joe Johnson in the team when he withdrew from the squad due to an injury. One Scottish journalist stated that the 'Hungarians played the prettiest football' and that the score-line was a 'crying injustice'. Another journalist stated that England's wingers, Sammy Crooks and Brook, contributed powerfully to the victory, that Brook constantly did the right thing and that his goal was a gem. A different journalist stated that 'on the extreme left Brook was the opportunist that he always is, and, like Drake, ever a potential matchwinner'. A journalist for the Nottingham Journal stated that Brook and Carter were the best forwards in the second half and that 'they had some splendid passing bouts'. Ted Drake scored a hat-trick in the game and Cliff Britton and Raich Carter scored England's other goals. Drake's second goal was scored from a corner taken by Brook.

In the 1938 British Home Championship Brook played alongside City teammate Sam Barkas in a 5–1 victory over Ireland. Brook's goal in the 75th minute was to be the last for his national team. One journalist stated that Brook was 'elusive and full of energy' within the game and that 'his roving commission frequently misleads defences'. Brook made his final appearance for England in a 2–1 victory over Wales in which his perfect pass set up Willie Hall to score the winning goal. One Scottish journalist, who attended the game, described Brook's performance in the game as 'brilliant'. England won the championship that season. Brook was called up to play for England in a game against Czechoslovakia in December 1937, which England won 5–4, but withdrew due to peritonitis and was replaced by West Ham's Jackie Morton. Czechoslovakia's football officials expressed regret that Brook was not able to play. Similarly, Brook was selected to play for England in a game against Scotland in April 1939, which England won 2–1, but withdrew due to a groin injury (which he sustained playing for City against Bury) and was replaced by Huddersfield Town's Pat Beasley. One journalist was not surprised by Brook's recall to the England team in 1939, stating that 'I have seen all the English forwards lately, and he was the best of the lot'.

In April 1939, Brook was selected to play for the FA XI on a tour in South Africa. Brook, like his City teammate Frank Swift, was selected to represent England in wartime internationals. Brook won two wartime caps in games against Wales and South Africa in 1939. In the game against South Africa, Brook captained England in a 3–0 victory. In the match against Wales, Brook played alongside his Manchester City teammates Frank Swift and Bert Sproston. The England team also included Joe Mercer, who would go on to manage Manchester City in the 1960s. In 1940, Brook was selected to represent England in a wartime international against Scotland. Whilst travelling to the match, he and Sam Barkas were involved in a car crash. Brook suffered a fractured skull. Brook and Barkas were replaced in the England team by Joe Richardson and the Scottish International Tommy Pearson. Brook received £1,625 in compensation for the collision.

== Retirement ==
As a consequence of the fractured skull that Brook sustained in a car accident while travelling to a wartime international game, he was unable to head a ball and decided to retire from football. His England teammates Frank Swift, Raich Carter, Stanley Matthews, Cliff Bastin and Tommy Lawton were able to continue their careers after the war. The lack of goal scoring wingers, such as Brook and Bastin, in the game in the 1950s was lamented. In contrast to many of his England teammates, following the war, Brook became a coach driver in his home town of Mexborough. Later in his life he also spent time working as a barman in Halifax, and as a crane operator. He died at home in Wythenshawe in March 1965.

== Legacy ==
Brook is regarded as one of the finest players to have graced the English game and has been inducted into the Manchester City Hall of Fame. In 1977 the Manchester City Council named eleven streets in a new estate in Moss Side after famous City players including Brook. He is listed as the eighth greatest ever City player on the Times website, seventh in Ian Penney's book The Essential History of Manchester City and fourth in the Manchester Evening News.

Brook appears in The EFG Bumper Book of QI Annuals in which he is portrayed (imaginarily) with one arm in a sling and another arm in the air, with his hand grasping the Jules Rimet Trophy, with two teammates holding him aloft, in a similar fashion to how Bobby Moore was held aloft by his teammates after England's victory in the 1966 FIFA World Cup final, due to his brace in the 3–2 victory over the then World Champions Italy at the Battle of Highbury in 1934. In 2018 Brook was honoured with a plaque in his home town of Mexborough. The plaque was unveiled at Mexborough Athletic Club in May 2018 at an event which was attended by former Manchester City player and club ambassador Mike Summerbee and local MP Ed Miliband.

== Career statistics ==
=== Club ===
Appearances and goals by club, season and competition
| Club | Season | League | | Cup | | Other | | Total | |
| Club | Season | Apps | Goals | Apps | Goals | Apps | Goals | Apps | Goals |
|---|---|---|---|---|---|---|---|---|---|
| Barnsley | 1925–26 | | | | | | | | |
| Barnsley | 1926–27 | | | | | | | | |
| Barnsley | 1927–28 | | | | | | | | |
| Barnsley | Total | 78 | 18 | | | | | 78 | 18 |
| Manchester City | 1927–28 | 12 | 2 | | | | | 12 | 2 |
| Manchester City | 1928–29 | 42 | 14 | 1 | 0 | | | 43 | 14 |
| Manchester City | 1929–30 | 40 | 16 | 5 | 1 | | | 45 | 17 |
| Manchester City | 1930–31 | 42 | 16 | 1 | 0 | | | 43 | 16 |
| Manchester City | 1931–32 | 42 | 10 | 5 | 3 | | | 47 | 13 |
| Manchester City | 1932–33 | 42 | 15 | 7 | 6 | | | 49 | 21 |
| Manchester City | 1933–34 | 38 | 8 | 8 | 3 | | | 46 | 11 |
| Manchester City | 1934–35 | 40 | 17 | 1 | 0 | 1 | 0 | 42 | 17 |
| Manchester City | 1935–36 | 40 | 13 | 3 | 3 | | | 43 | 16 |
| Manchester City | 1936–37 | 42 | 20 | 4 | 2 | | | 46 | 22 |
| Manchester City | 1937–38 | 36 | 16 | 4 | 1 | 1 | 0 | 41 | 17 |
| Manchester City | 1938–39 | 34 | 11 | 2 | 0 | 1 | 0 | 37 | 11 |
| Manchester City | 1939–40 | 3 | 1 | | | 5 | 2 | 8 | 3 |
| Manchester City | Total | 450 | 158 | 41 | 19 | 8 | 2 | 499 | 179 |
| Career total | | 528 | 176 | 41 | 19 | 8 | 2 | 577 | 197 |

=== International ===
Scores and results list England's goal tally first, score column indicates score after each Brook goal.

List of international goals scored by Eric Brook
| No. | Date | Venue | Opponent | Score | Result | Competition | Ref. |
|---|---|---|---|---|---|---|---|
| 1 | 14 October 1933 | Windsor Park, Belfast | Ireland | | 3–0 | 1934 British Home Championship | |
| 2 | 15 November 1933 | St James' Park, Newcastle | Wales | | 1–2 | 1934 British Home Championship | |
| 3 | 14 December 1933 | White Hart Lane, London | France | | 4–1 | Friendly | |
| 4 | 14 April 1934 | Empire Stadium, Wembley | Scotland | | 3–0 | 1934 British Home Championship | |
| 5 | 29 September 1934 | Ninian Park | Wales | | 4–0 | 1935 British Home Championship | |
| 6 | 14 November 1934 | Arsenal Stadium | Italy | | 3–2 | Friendly | |
| 7 | 14 November 1934 | Arsenal Stadium | Italy | | 3–2 | Friendly | |
| 8 | 19 October 1935 | Windsor Park, Belfast | Ireland | | 3–1 | 1936 British Home Championship | |
| 9 | 2 December 1936 | Arsenal Stadium | Hungary | | 6–2 | Friendly | |
| 10 | 23 October 1937 | Windsor Park, Belfast | Ireland | | 5–1 | 1938 British Home Championship | |

== Honours ==
Manchester City

- Football League First Division: 1936–37
- FA Cup: 1933–34; runner-up: 1932–33
- FA Charity Shield: 1937

England

- British Home Championship: 1929–30, 1934–35 (shared), 1937–38

Individual

- Manchester City Hall of Fame: 2004
