= Jack Rigby =

English footballer

Personal information
- Full name: Jack Rigby
- Date of birth: 29 July 1924
- Place of birth: Golborne, England
- Date of death: 1997 (aged 72–73)
- Place of death: Blackburn, England
- Position: Centre half

Youth career
- Bryn Boys Brigade Manchester City Reserves 1946-1950

Senior career*
Years	Team	Apps	(Gls)
1946–1947 1949-1953	Manchester City	100	(0)
Total		100	(0)
- * Club domestic league appearances and goals

Jack Rigby (1924–1997) was a footballer who played as a centre half in the Football League for Manchester City.

His made a single appearance as a last-minute replacement for Les McDowall in the 1946–47 season, in a two nill loss at home to Newcastle in the Football League Second Division.

He failed to make an appearance in the 1947/48 and 1948/49 seasons.

Rigby played six times in the 1949/50 season, replacing Billy Walsh on several occasions.

With Joe Fagan sustaining an injury he would never recover fully from and Bert Sproston retiring, Rigby used his chance to break into the first team and played 37 league matches. He caused a penalty by handball away against Doncaster, one of the goals that helped Doncaster come back from 3:0 down to win the match 4:3. Fagan had briefly come back from injury, but broke his leg in early 1951.

He also played with the England reserve national team in November 1951, while the first and reserve team where training at Maine Road, and two local players were needed to complete the teams.

In the 1951/52 season Rigby continued to be a starter and even played in the famed friendly against River Plate, the first Argentinian win on British soil. He ended up making 40 appearances that season, 2 of which were in the FA Cup. He also played in the clubs Spanish tour that season.

The 1952/53 season was his final season for the club. He played 18 times.

Supposedly there was a testimonial match held for him, the proceeds of which he used to buy a small shop.
