= Ernie Toseland =

English footballer

Personal information
- Full name: Ernie Toseland
- Date of birth: 17 March 1905
- Place of birth: Northampton, England
- Date of death: 19 October 1987 (aged 82)
- Height: 5 ft 6 in (1.68 m)
- Position: Outside right

Senior career*
Years	Team	Apps	(Gls)
1927–1929	Coventry City	22	(11)
1929–1938	Manchester City	368	(61)
1938–1939	Sheffield Wednesday		
1946–	Mossley		
- * Club domestic league appearances and goals

Ernie Toseland (17 March 1905 – 19 October 1987) was an English footballer who played in the outside right position. He has been described as 'a flying winger – football's Jesse Owens'.

== Early life ==
Toseland was born in Northampton in 1905. He began his career as a footballer playing for Higham Ferrers Town and in 1927 joined Coventry City for £50 after playing against their reserve team. In his first reserve game he broke his collarbone and did not play for a year. He scored on his first team debut at Watford and his sensational speed and dribbling quickly made him a fan's favourite. The First Division scouts were soon alerted to his prowess and after just 22 games for Coventry (and 11 goals) he was signed by Manchester City for a club record £3000. Contemporary reports describe him as Coventry City's most gifted player of the decade.

== Manchester City ==
In March 1929, he left Coventry City for a fee of £3000 to join Manchester City who were then in the First Division. He was part of the City team until 1938 and appeared 411 times, scoring 75 goals in the process. Toseland joined a strong forward line at City which included England internationals such as outside left Eric Brook, inside forward Tommy Johnson and centre forward Fred Tilson. The City team also included the England international centre half Sam Cowan and Scotland captain Jimmy McMullan.

Toseland made his debut in a 2-1 victory against Bury on 21 April 1929, and his first goal for City was scored in a 3–0 victory over Aston Villa in the 1928–1929 football season. Eric Brook and Tommy Johnson scored the other goals. That season City finished eighth and Tommy Johnson scored a club record of 38 league goals.

In the 1929–1930 season Manchester City finished third in the first division, three points behind runners up Derby County. Toseland scored three goals in the FA Cup that season but Manchester City were knocked out by Hull City in the fifth round. In the 1930–1931 season, City finished eighth in the league and Toseland scored ten league goals for the club. Eric Brook was the team's leading goalscorer that season with 16 goals. In the 1931–1932 season the City team, which now included the Scottish centre forward Alec Herd, managed to reach the semi-final of the FA Cup but were defeated by Arsenal by 1–0 with a goal from England international Cliff Bastin.

In the following season, Toseland scored in the third round of the 1933 FA Cup to draw 1-1 with Gateshead, whom they beat 9-0 in the replay match the following week. In the 1933 FA Cup Final he was part of the Manchester City team that was defeated three goals to nil by Everton who were captained by England international Dixie Dean. The Everton team also included former City player Tommy Johnson. In the 1934 FA Cup Final Toseland was part of the City team which beat Portsmouth 2–1. Toseland had scored once in a 6–1 victory over Aston Villa in the semi-final of that year's competition. The other goals were scored by Alec Herd and Fred Tilson (who scored four).

In the 1934–1935 football season Toseland scored five goals and City finished fourth in the league, ten points behind champions Arsenal. One of Toseland's five goals that season came in a memorable 5–0 victory against Wolverhampton Wanderers on the final day of the season. In the 1935–1936 season, Toseland was again City's fourth highest scorer in the league with ten goals. Eric Brook was the leading scorer with thirteen goals.

In the 1936–1937 football season Toseland was part of the first Manchester City side to win the League Championship, with an appearance in all 42 games played and 7 goals scored. The team went on an unbeaten run after Christmas, winning 14 times and drawing 6 games. The championship was won at Maine Road with a 4–1 victory over Sheffield Wednesday. In the 1937–1938 football season, Toseland was part of the City team that were relegated from the first division despite scoring more goals than any other team. In 1938 he transferred to Sheffield Wednesday but only played fifteen times for his new team before the outbreak of war.

== Retirement ==
Toseland continued to play amateur football after the war, signing for Mossley at the age of 41 and scored 12 goals in 49 appearances in the 1946–47 season, before retiring at the end of the season. He died in Stockport on 19 October 1987.

== Honours ==
=== As a player ===
Manchester City

- Football League First Division: 1936–37
- FA Cup: 1933–34; runner-up: 1932–33
