= Alec Herd =

Scottish footballer (1911–1982)

Personal information
- Full name: Alexander Herd
- Date of birth: 8 November 1911
- Place of birth: Bowhill, Fife, Scotland
- Date of death: 21 August 1982 (aged 70)
- Place of death: Dumfries, Scotland
- Height: 5 ft 8 in (1.73 m)
- Position: Inside forward

Youth career
- Hearts of Beath

Senior career*
Years	Team	Apps	(Gls)
1928–1933	Hamilton Academical	85	(41)
1933–1948	Manchester City	257	(107)
1948–1951	Stockport County	111	(35)
Total		453	(183)

International career
1942	Scotland (wartime)	1	(0)
- * Club domestic league appearances and goals

Alexander Herd (8 November 1911 – 21 August 1982) was a Scottish professional footballer. Born in Bowhill, Fife, he played as a forward for Hamilton Academical, Manchester City and Stockport County. Herd also represented Scotland in a wartime international match.

== Early life ==
Herd was born in Bowhill, in Fife, Scotland in 1911. His football career began at Hamilton Academicals in the Scottish League. In 1933 he transferred to the English team Manchester City who were then in the first division.

== Manchester City ==
When Herd signed for Manchester City, the team included England Internationals Eric Brook, Sam Cowan, Jackie Bray, Frank Swift and Fred Tilson and former Scotland captain Jimmy McMullan. His debut for City came in a 1–0 defeat to Blackpool. Herd scored his first goal for City in a 2–1 victory against Derby County. The outside right Ernie Toseland scored the other goal for City. In his first season for the Manchester team Herd played in 14 league matches and scored 7 goals. He was also part of the City team which was defeated 3–0 by Everton in the 1933 FA Cup Final. In his second season at the club, the 1933–34 season, Herd was City's top scorer with 17 goals. He was also part of the City team which beat Portsmouth 2–1 in the 1934 FA Cup Final with two goals from Fred Tilson.

In the 1934–35 football season Herd scored 14 goals and City finished fourth in the league, ten points behind champions Arsenal. Herd was City's third top scorer that season behind Fred Tilson who scored 18 goals and Eric Brook who scored 17 goals. In the following season, Herd was Manchester City's third top scorer with 10 goals, behind Eric Brook who scored 13 and Fred Tilson who scored 11. Matt Busby and Sam Cowan had left the City team in this season but Sam Barkas had been brought in from Bradford City and Peter Doherty was bought from Blackpool. Doherty had an immediate impact on the team. Doherty scored two goals, Brook scored a hat trick and Herd and Toseland each scored one goal as City defeated Bolton Wanderers 7–0 in March of that season. Herd also scored a brace in a 6–0 victory against Middlesbrough.

In the 1936–37 football season Herd was part of the first Manchester City side to win the League. The team went on an unbeaten run after Christmas, winning 14 times and drawing 6 games. The championship was won at Maine Road with a 4–1 victory over Sheffield Wednesday. Herd was City's third highest scorer that season behind Peter Doherty who scored 30 goals and Eric Brook who scored 20. In the 1937–38 football season Herd was part of the City team that were relegated from the first division despite scoring more goals than any other team. Herd was again City's third highest scorer that season with 12 goals. In the 1938–39 season he was City's top scorer with 20 goals. The team finished fourth in division two that season, six points behind winners Blackburn Rovers. The second world war interrupted Herd's football career but he continued playing afterwards and scored 11 goals for City in both the 1945–46 and 1946–47 football seasons. His final season with the Manchester team was the 1947–48 football season. His last goal for the club came in a 3–0 victory against Stoke City. In 257 league games for City Herd had scored 107 goals. He also appeared in the 3 games in season 1939–40 expunged from the records.

== Stockport County ==
In 1948 Herd joined Stockport County on a free transfer. In 111 appearances for Stockport he scored 35 goals. He also made history by playing alongside his son, David Herd, in a 2–0 win against Hartlepools United on 5 May 1951, in the 1950–51 season of the Football League Third Division North. He died in Scotland in 1982 at the age of 70.

== International ==
Herd was one of three members of his family to gain recognition for their footballing skills at national level. He played for Scotland in one of the (unofficial) wartime international matches, a 5–4 win against England in April 1942. His elder brother Sandy, a left-half with Heart of Midlothian, played for Scotland in the 1930s and his son David, the Arsenal striker, represented Scotland five times between 1959 and 1961.

== Legacy ==
Herd is listed as one of Manchester City's fifty greatest players in Ian Penney's book The Essential History of Manchester City.

== Honours ==
Manchester City

- FA Cup: 1933–34; runner-up: 1932–33
