= Bob Donnelly (footballer) =

Scottish footballer

Personal information
- Full name: Robert Donnelly
- Date of birth: 9 September 1908
- Place of birth: Craigneuk, Scotland
- Date of death: 3 June 1969 (aged 60)
- Place of death: Carluke, Scotland
- Height: 5 ft 11 in (1.80 m)
- Position: Centre half

Senior career*
Years	Team	Apps	(Gls)
–	Wishaw Juniors		
1931–1935	Partick Thistle	74	(0)
1935–1937	Manchester City	37	(1)
1937–1938	Morton	7	(0)
Total		108	(1)
- * Club domestic league appearances and goals

Robert Donnelly (9 September 1908 – 3 June 1969) was a Scottish footballer who played as a centre half for Partick Thistle, Manchester City and Morton.

While with Partick, he was selected for a Scottish Football Association tour of North America in the summer of 1935; none of the matches was considered a full international. He moved to Manchester City as a replacement for Sam Cowan for a £5,000 transfer fee a matter of days after his return from tour, and was a member of the squad when the Citizens won the Football League championship in 1936–37, albeit he made only five appearances during the campaign with the more experienced Bobby Marshall moving back from an inside forward role to play in the heart of the defence.
