= Gordon Clark (footballer) =

English footballer

Gordon Vincent Clark
- Born: 15 June 1914
- Died: 18 October 1997 (aged 83)
- Occupation: professional footballer

Gordon Vincent Clark (15 June 1914 – 18 October 1997) was an English professional footballer who played as a full back. He later undertook various managerial, coaching and scouting positions.

Clark was 5 ft 7 1/2 in (1.71 m) tall.

Clark was the third manager of Aldershot F.C., taking over from Bill McCracken in January 1950 and left at the end of the 1954/55 season.
