= Dick Neilson =

English footballer

Personal information
- Full name: Richard Neilson
- Date of birth: 1 April 1916
- Place of birth: Blackhall, England
- Date of death: 14 December 2005 (aged 89)
- Place of death: Manchester, England
- Height: 5 ft 9 1/2 in (1.77 m)
- Position: Centre-half

Senior career*
Years	Team	Apps	(Gls)
1936–1948	Manchester City	16	(1)
Total		16	(1)

Managerial career
- Droylsden
- * Club domestic league appearances and goals

Richard Neilson (1 April 1916 – 14 December 2005) was an English professional footballer who played as a centre half for Manchester City and was later manager of Droylsden.
