= Maurice Dunkley =

English footballer and cricketer

Personal information
- Full name: Maurice Edward Frank Dunkley
- Date of birth: 19 February 1914
- Place of birth: Kettering, England
- Date of death: 27 December 1989 (aged 75)
- Place of death: Uppingham, England
- Position: Winger

Senior career*
Years	Team	Apps	(Gls)
1936–1937	Northampton Town	26	(5)
1937–1947	Manchester City	51	(5)
1947–1949	Kettering Town		
1949–1950	Northampton Town	4	(0)
- Corby Town
Total		81	(10)
- * Club domestic league appearances and goals

Maurice Edward Frank Dunkley (19 February 1914 – 27 December 1989) was an English footballer, who played as a winger in the Football League for Northampton Town and Manchester City. He also played first-class cricket for Northamptonshire in 36 matches between 1937 and 1939.
