= Joe Richardson (footballer, born 1908) =

English footballer

Personal information
- Full name: Joseph Richardson
- Date of birth: 24 August 1908
- Place of birth: Bedlington, England
- Date of death: 1977 (aged 68–69)
- Height: 5 ft 8 in (1.73 m)
- Position: Right back

Senior career*
Years	Team	Apps	(Gls)
- New Delaval Villa
?–1929	Blyth Spartans		
1929–1938	Newcastle United	208	(1)

International career
1939	England (wartime)	1	(0)
- * Club domestic league appearances and goals

Joseph Richardson (24 August 1908 – 1977) was an English professional footballer who played as a right back.

Richardson joined Blyth Spartans from local side New Delaval Villa. His form with Spartans was impressive enough to earn a £250 move to Newcastle United in 1929. He went on to play over 200 league games for Newcastle, and after ending his playing career in 1938 joined the coaching staff where he remained until 1977, serving the club for 48 years. He died in 1977.
