= South Bank St Peters F.C. =

English football club

South Bank St Peters F.C. was an English association football club which participated in the FA Cup.

== Colours ==
The club colours were green and white quarters.

== Ground ==
The club played at South Bank Road.
