= Jimmy Heale =

English footballer

Personal information
- Full name: James Arthur Heale
- Date of birth: 16 September 1914
- Place of birth: Bristol, England
- Date of death: 22 May 1997 (aged 82)
- Height: 5 ft 11 1/2 in (1.82 m)
- Positions: Inside forward; centre forward

Senior career*
Years	Team	Apps	(Gls)
1931–1933	Bristol City	26	(8)
1933–1940	Manchester City	86	(39)
- * Club domestic league appearances and goals

James Arthur Heale (16 September 1914 – 22 May 1997) was an English footballer who played for Bristol City, Manchester City.

== Career ==
Heale attended South Street School and played in an international trial for school boys. Other clubs interested when he was transferred to Manchester City F.C., were Arsenal, Leicester City, Aston Villa, Wolverhampton Wanderers, and Leeds United. Manchester City paid £3,500 for Heale in January 1934. The year of Heale's transfer was the year Manchester City won the FA Cup, but he was cup-tied, having played for Bristol City in the first round.

Heale joined players such as Matt Busby and Frank Swift at Manchester City F.C. Problems with his knee the season that City won the League Championship, caused him to miss out on a medal. Some tipped Heale as a future England international. A serious leg injury finished his career in 1938/1939.
