= 1933–34 FA Cup =

Tournament details
- Country: England; Wales

Final positions
- Champions: Manchester City (2nd title)
- Runners-up: Portsmouth

The 1933–34 FA Cup was the 59th season of the world's oldest football cup competition, the Football Association Challenge Cup, commonly known as the FA Cup. Manchester City won the competition for the second time, beating Portsmouth 2–1 in the final at Wembley, winning through two late goals from Fred Tilson.

Matches were scheduled to be played at the stadium of the team named first on the date specified for each round, which was always a Saturday. Some matches, however, might be rescheduled for other days if there were clashes with games for other competitions or the weather was inclement. If scores were level after 90 minutes had been played, a replay would take place at the stadium of the second-named team later the same week. If the replayed match was drawn further replays would be held until a winner was determined. If scores were level after 90 minutes had been played in a replay, a 30-minute period of extra time would be played. The 1933-34 competition was notable in that no second replays were required throughout the competition proper.

== Calendar ==
Round	Date
Extra preliminary round	Saturday 2 September 1933
Preliminary round	Saturday 16 September 1933
First round qualifying	Saturday 30 September 1933
Second round qualifying	Saturday 14 October 1933
Third round qualifying	Saturday 28 October 1933
Fourth round qualifying	Saturday 11 November 1933
First round proper	Saturday 25 November 1933
Second round proper	Saturday 9 December 1933
Third round proper	Saturday 13 January 1934
Fourth round proper	Saturday 27 January 1934
Fifth round proper	Saturday 17 February 1934
Sixth round proper	Saturday 3 March 1934
Semi-finals	Saturday 17 March 1934
Final	Saturday 28 April 1934

== Qualifying rounds ==
Most participating clubs that were not members of the Football League competed in the qualifying rounds to secure one of 25 places available in the first round.

The 25 winners from the fourth qualifying round were Spennymoor United, North Shields, South Bank St Peters, Scarborough, Darwen, Workington, Altrincham, Lancaster Town, Scunthorpe & Lindsey United, Gainsborough Trinity, Newark Town, Sutton Town, Kettering Town, Oxford City, Ilford, Barnet, Margate, Dulwich Hamlet, Northfleet United, Hayes, Epsom Town, Dartford, London Paper Mills, Bath City and Cheltenham Town.

Those appearing in the competition proper for the first time were North Shields, South Bank St Peters, Altrincham, Sutton Town, Epsom Town, London Paper Mills and Cheltenham Town, while Oxford City had not featured in the first round since 1906-07.

Cheltenham Town emulated Brighton & Hove Albion's achievement from the previous season of competing in nine consecutive rounds of the tournament. Entering in the extra preliminary round, Cheltenham defeated Mount Hill Enterprise, St Philip's Athletic, Street and Merthyr Town before losing to Llanelli in a third qualifying round replay at Whaddon Road. However, Llanelli was later disqualified for fielding ineligible imported players in the initial match at Stebonheath Park, resulting in Cheltenham being re-instated and overcoming Calne & Harris United, Barnet and Carlisle United before going out to Blackpool in front of a record home attendance at the Athletic Ground in the third round.

London Paper Mills also progressed from the extra preliminary round to the main draw, defeating Bostall Heath, Bexleyheath & Welling, Erith & Belvedere, Sheppey United, Aylesford Paper Mills and Ryde Sports before losing to Southend United in the first round.

== First round proper ==
At this stage 41 clubs from the Football League Third Division North and South joined the 25 non-league sides that came through the qualifying rounds. Chesterfield, Brighton & Hove Albion and Luton Town were given byes to the third round. To make the number of matches up, non-league clubs Folkestone and Kingstonian were given byes to this round, with Kingstonian having won the previous season's FA Amateur Cup.

34 matches were scheduled to be played on Saturday, 25 November 1933. Seven were drawn and went to replays in the following midweek fixture.

Tie no	Home team	Score	Away team	Date
1	Chester	6–1	Darlington	25 November 1933
2	Bournemouth & Boscombe Athletic	3–0	Hayes	25 November 1933
3	Barrow	4–2	Doncaster Rovers	25 November 1933
4	Bath City	0–0	Charlton Athletic	25 November 1933
Replay	Charlton Athletic	3–1	Bath City	29 November 1933
5	Watford	0–3	Reading	25 November 1933
6	Walsall	4–0	Spennymoor United	25 November 1933
7	Folkestone	0–0	Bristol Rovers	25 November 1933
Replay	Bristol Rovers	3–1	Folkestone	29 November 1933
8	Gainsborough Trinity	1–0	Altrincham	25 November 1933
9	Ilford	2–4	Swindon Town	25 November 1933
10	Tranmere Rovers	7–0	Newark Town	25 November 1933
11	Sutton Town	2–1	Rochdale	25 November 1933
12	Oxford City	1–5	Gillingham	25 November 1933
13	Queens Park Rangers	6–0	Kettering Town	25 November 1933
14	Northampton Town	2–0	Exeter City	25 November 1933
15	Coventry City	3–0	Crewe Alexandra	25 November 1933
16	Northfleet United	0–2	Dartford	25 November 1933
17	Carlisle United	2–1	Wrexham	25 November 1933
18	Clapton Orient	4–2	Epsom Town	25 November 1933
19	Crystal Palace	3–0	Norwich City	25 November 1933
20	Lancaster Town	0–1	Stockport County	25 November 1933
21	Scunthorpe & Lindsey United	1–1	Accrington Stanley	25 November 1933
Replay	Accrington Stanley	3–0	Scunthorpe & Lindsey United	29 November 1933
22	Cardiff City	0–0	Aldershot	25 November 1933
Replay	Aldershot	3–1	Cardiff City	29 November 1933
23	Halifax Town	3–2	Barnsley	25 November 1933
24	Cheltenham Town	5–1	Barnet	25 November 1933
25	Kingstonian	1–7	Bristol City	25 November 1933
26	Dulwich Hamlet	2–2	Newport County	25 November 1933
Replay	Newport County	6–2	Dulwich Hamlet	30 November 1933
27	New Brighton	0–0	Mansfield Town	25 November 1933
Replay	Mansfield Town	3–4	New Brighton	29 November 1933
28	Torquay United	1–1	Margate	25 November 1933
Replay	Margate	0–2	Torquay United	30 November 1933
29	Workington	1–0	Southport	25 November 1933
30	York City	2–3	Hartlepools United	25 November 1933
31	Rotherham United	3–2	South Bank St Peters	25 November 1933
32	Gateshead	5–2	Darwen	25 November 1933
33	North Shields	3–0	Scarborough	25 November 1933
34	London Paper Mills	0–1	Southend United	25 November 1933

== Second round proper ==
The matches were played on Saturday, 9 December 1933. Three matches were drawn, with replays taking place in the following midweek fixture.

Tie no	Home team	Score	Away team	Date
1	Bournemouth & Boscombe Athletic	2–4	Tranmere Rovers	9 December 1933
2	Bristol City	2–1	Barrow	9 December 1933
3	Walsall	0–0	Clapton Orient	9 December 1933
Replay	Clapton Orient	2–0	Walsall	14 December 1933
4	Gainsborough Trinity	0–2	Aldershot	9 December 1933
5	Swindon Town	1–0	Dartford	9 December 1933
6	Sutton Town	1–2	Reading	9 December 1933
7	Stockport County	1–2	Crystal Palace	9 December 1933
8	Queens Park Rangers	1–1	New Brighton	9 December 1933
Replay	New Brighton	0–4	Queens Park Rangers	13 December 1933
9	Accrington Stanley	1–0	Bristol Rovers	9 December 1933
10	Northampton Town	3–0	Torquay United	9 December 1933
11	Carlisle United	1–2	Cheltenham Town	9 December 1933
12	Southend United	2–1	Chester	9 December 1933
13	Halifax Town	1–1	Hartlepools United	9 December 1933
Replay	Hartlepools United	1–2	Halifax Town	13 December 1933
14	Charlton Athletic	1–0	Gillingham	9 December 1933
15	Workington	3–1	Newport County	9 December 1933
16	Rotherham United	2–1	Coventry City	9 December 1933
17	Gateshead	1–0	North Shields	9 December 1933

== Third round proper ==
The 44 First and Second Division clubs entered the competition at this stage, along with Chesterfield, Brighton & Hove Albion and Luton Town. Cheltenham Town was the first non-league club to reach this stage (or its pre-1925 equivalent) from the extra preliminary round since Hednesford Town and Thornycrofts (Woolston) in 1919–20.

The matches were scheduled for Saturday, 13 January 1934. Nine matches were drawn and went to replays in the following midweek fixture.

Tie no	Home team	Score	Away team	Date
1	Birmingham	2–1	Sheffield United	13 January 1934
2	Chesterfield	2–2	Aston Villa	13 January 1934
Replay	Aston Villa	2–0	Chesterfield	17 January 1934
3	Bristol City	1–1	Derby County	13 January 1934
Replay	Derby County	1–0	Bristol City	17 January 1934
4	Burnley	0–0	Bury	13 January 1934
Replay	Bury	3–2	Burnley	17 January 1934
5	Liverpool	1–1	Fulham	13 January 1934
Replay	Fulham	2–3	Liverpool	17 January 1934
6	Southampton	1–1	Northampton Town	13 January 1934
Replay	Northampton Town	1–0	Southampton	18 January 1934
7	Reading	1–2	Oldham Athletic	13 January 1934
8	Leicester City	3–0	Lincoln City	13 January 1934
9	Nottingham Forest	4–0	Queens Park Rangers	13 January 1934
10	Bolton Wanderers	3–1	Halifax Town	13 January 1934
11	Grimsby Town	1–0	Clapton Orient	13 January 1934
12	Wolverhampton Wanderers	1–0	Newcastle United	13 January 1934
13	Sunderland	1–1	Middlesbrough	13 January 1934
Replay	Middlesbrough	1–2	Sunderland	17 January 1934
14	Luton Town	0–1	Arsenal	13 January 1934
15	Tranmere Rovers	3–0	Southend United	13 January 1934
16	Tottenham Hotspur	3–0	Everton	13 January 1934
17	Manchester City	3–1	Blackburn Rovers	13 January 1934
18	West Ham United	3–2	Bradford City	13 January 1934
19	Brighton & Hove Albion	3–1	Swindon Town	13 January 1934
20	Manchester United	1–1	Portsmouth	13 January 1934
Replay	Portsmouth	4–1	Manchester United	17 January 1934
21	Plymouth Argyle	1–1	Huddersfield Town	13 January 1934
Replay	Huddersfield Town	6–2	Plymouth Argyle	17 January 1934
22	Millwall	3–0	Accrington Stanley	13 January 1934
23	Hull City	1–0	Brentford	13 January 1934
24	Crystal Palace	1–0	Aldershot	13 January 1934
25	Chelsea	1–1	West Bromwich Albion	13 January 1934
Replay	West Bromwich Albion	0–1	Chelsea	17 January 1934
26	Swansea Town	1–0	Notts County	13 January 1934
27	Charlton Athletic	2–0	Port Vale	13 January 1934
28	Cheltenham Town	1–3	Blackpool	13 January 1934
29	Leeds United	0–1	Preston North End	13 January 1934
30	Workington	4–1	Gateshead	13 January 1934
31	Stoke City	3–0	Bradford Park Avenue	13 January 1934
32	Rotherham United	0–3	Sheffield Wednesday	13 January 1934

== Fourth round proper ==
The matches were scheduled for Saturday, 27 January 1934. Five games were drawn and went to replays in the following midweek fixture. Workington was the last non-league club left in the competition.

Tie no	Home team	Score	Away team	Date
1	Birmingham	1–0	Charlton Athletic	27 January 1934
2	Bury	1–1	Swansea Town	27 January 1934
Replay	Swansea Town	3–0	Bury	1 February 1934
3	Liverpool	3–1	Tranmere Rovers	27 January 1934
4	Aston Villa	7–2	Sunderland	27 January 1934
5	Derby County	3–0	Wolverhampton Wanderers	27 January 1934
6	Tottenham Hotspur	4–1	West Ham United	27 January 1934
7	Portsmouth	2–0	Grimsby Town	27 January 1934
8	Brighton & Hove Albion	1–1	Bolton Wanderers	27 January 1934
Replay	Bolton Wanderers	6–1	Brighton & Hove Albion	31 January 1934
9	Millwall	3–6	Leicester City	27 January 1934
10	Hull City	2–2	Manchester City	27 January 1934
Replay	Manchester City	4–1	Hull City	31 January 1934
11	Oldham Athletic	1–1	Sheffield Wednesday	27 January 1934
Replay	Sheffield Wednesday	6–1	Oldham Athletic	31 January 1934
12	Chelsea	1–1	Nottingham Forest	27 January 1934
Replay	Nottingham Forest	0–3	Chelsea	31 January 1934
13	Huddersfield Town	0–2	Northampton Town	27 January 1934
14	Arsenal	7–0	Crystal Palace	27 January 1934
15	Workington	1–2	Preston North End	27 January 1934
16	Stoke City	3–0	Blackpool	27 January 1934

== Fifth round proper ==
The matches were scheduled for Saturday, 17 February 1934. There was one replay, in the Sheffield Wednesday–Manchester City match, played in the next midweek fixture.

Tie no	Home team	Score	Away team	Date
1	Birmingham	1–2	Leicester City	17 February 1934
2	Liverpool	0–3	Bolton Wanderers	17 February 1934
3	Preston North End	4–0	Northampton Town	17 February 1934
4	Sheffield Wednesday	2–2	Manchester City	17 February 1934
Replay	Manchester City	2–0	Sheffield Wednesday	21 February 1934
5	Tottenham Hotspur	0–1	Aston Villa	17 February 1934
6	Swansea Town	0–1	Portsmouth	17 February 1934
7	Arsenal	1–0	Derby County	17 February 1934
8	Stoke City	3–1	Chelsea	17 February 1934

== Sixth round proper ==
The four Sixth Round ties were scheduled to be played on Saturday, 3 March 1934. There were no replays.

Tie no	Home team	Score	Away team	Date
1	Preston North End	0–1	Leicester City	3 March 1934
2	Bolton Wanderers	0–3	Portsmouth	3 March 1934
3	Manchester City	1–0	Stoke City	3 March 1934
4	Arsenal	1–2	Aston Villa	3 March 1934

== Semi-finals ==
The semi-final matches were played on Saturday, 17 March 1934. Manchester City and Portsmouth won their matches to meet in the final at Wembley

17 March 1934
15:00

Manchester City	6–1	Aston Villa

Leeds Road, Huddersfield

17 March 1934
15:00

Portsmouth	4–1	Leicester City

St. Andrew's, Birmingham

== Final ==
The 1934 FA Cup Final was contested by Manchester City and Portsmouth at Wembley. Manchester City won the game through two late goals from Fred Tilson, after Septimus Rutherford had put Portsmouth ahead midway through the first half.

=== Match details ===
28 April 1934
15:00 BST

Manchester City	2–1	Portsmouth
Tilson 74' 88'	(Report)	Rutherford 28'

Wembley, London
Attendance: 93,258
Referee: Stanley Rous, Hertfordshire

Manchester City	Portsmouth

== See also ==
- FA Cup Final Results 1872-
