= Bert Sproston =

English footballer

Personal information
- Date of birth: June 22, 1915
- Place of birth: Elworth, England
- Date of death: January 27, 2000 (aged 84)
- Position: Full back

Senior career*
Years	Team	Apps	(Gls)
- Leeds United
	Manchester City	125	(5)
- Millwall
- Tottenham Hotspur

International career
	England	11	(0)
- * Club domestic league appearances and goals

Bert Sproston (22 June 1915 – 27 January 2000) was an English football full back who is remembered for playing both at international level for the England national football team and at club level for Leeds United, Manchester City, Millwall and Tottenham Hotspur.

He was born in Elworth on 22 June 1914. He played for England 11 times and also won 2 wartime caps. With Manchester City he made 125 appearances and scored 5 goals. After his playing career ended he spent over two decades as trainer at Bolton Wanderers. He died on 27 January 2000.

After appearing in the infamous Germany vs England game in Berlin in 1938 he was approached by Rolf Friedland who was a 17-year-old Jew trying to escape Nazi Germany. Upon his return to the UK after the game he worked with Tottenham and the FA to secure an invitation for Rolf to visit the UK for a representative football match from which Friedland managed to turn the visit into a permanent stay.

On an England trip to Berlin in 1938, Sproston told Stanley Matthews "I know nowt 'bout politics and t'like. All I knows is football. But t'way I see it, yon 'Itler fella is an evil little twat".
