= Keiller McCullough =

Irish footballer

Personal information
- Full name: Keiller McCullough
- Date of birth: 5 March 1905
- Place of birth: Larne, Ireland
- Height: 5 ft 10 1/2 in (1.79 m)
- Positions: Right half; inside right

Senior career*
Years	Team	Apps	(Gls)
1927–1935	Belfast Celtic		
1935–1937	Manchester City	17	(1)
1937–1939	Northampton Town	38	(1)
Total		55	(2)

International career
1935–1936	Ireland	5	(0)
- * Club domestic league appearances and goals

Keiller McCullough (born 25 March 1905) was an Irish professional footballer who played as a right half and inside right for Belfast Celtic, Manchester City, and Northampton Town.
