= Fred Tilson =

English footballer (1904–1972)

Personal information
- Full name: Samuel Frederick Tilson
- Date of birth: 19 April 1904
- Place of birth: Swinton, England
- Date of death: 21 November 1972 (aged 68)
- Place of death: Manchester, England
- Height: 5 ft 9 1/2 in (1.77 m)
- Position: Centre forward

Senior career*
Years	Team	Apps	(Gls)
1926–1928	Barnsley	61	(23)
1928–1938	Manchester City	264	(110)
1938–1939	Northampton Town	41	(10)
1939–	York City		

International career
1934–1935	England	4	(6)
- * Club domestic league appearances and goals

Samuel Frederick Tilson (19 April 1904 – 21 November 1972) was an English professional footballer who played as a centre forward for England along with Barnsley, Manchester City, Northampton Town and York City. With the Sky Blues he won the 1928 Second Division title, the 1934 FA Cup and the 1937 First Division title. Tilson was later inducted into the Manchester City Hall of Fame. He's also tied alongside Billie Gillespie as Man City's ninth highest goalscorer of all time.

== Early life ==
Tilson was born in Swinton, West Riding of Yorkshire on 19 April 1904. He began his football career at Barnsley Congregationals and was able to play in both inside forward and centre forward positions. Subsequently he moved to Barnsley where he notched 21 goals in 61 appearances.

== Manchester City ==
In 1928, Tilson along with his friend Eric Brook, were transferred to Manchester City for a combined fee of £6,000. The pair made their debuts on 17 March against Grimsby Town. Brook and Tilson joined a strong forward line at the club that included two England internationals in Tommy Johnson and Frank Roberts. In his first season Tilson made 6 appearances and helped City earn promotion to the first division. In his second season with the team he played 22 times and scored 12 goals making him City's third highest goalscorer behind Tommy Johnson who scored a club record of 38 goals and Eric Brook who scored 14 goals. Injuries restricted his appearances in the football season of 1929–1930 and 1930–1931. He scored 13 league goals in the 1931–1932 football season and 3 FA Cup goals. City managed to reach the semi-final of the FA Cup that year but were defeated by Arsenal by 1–0. In the 1932–1933 football season Tilson was the club's leading goalscorer with 23 goals in all competitions. This included 17 league goals and 6 FA Cup goals. In the 1933 FA Cup final Manchester City were defeated three goals to nil by Everton who were captained by England international Dixie Dean. Tilson did not play in the final of that year's competition but did play in the 1934 FA Cup final in which he scored twice in a 2–1 victory over Portsmouth. City had been trailing by a goal to nil at half time and City goalkeeper Frank Swift blamed himself for that had given Portsmouth the lead. Tilson in an attempt to console the young keeper told him not to worry because he would score two in the second half. He was true to his words. Tilson would make 264 league appearances for the team and score 110 goals.

== Death ==
Fred Tilson died in Wythenshawe hospital in Manchester on 21 November 1972. He was cremated 3 days later. He had been chief scout at Maine Road until Malcolm Allison was appointed manager.

== Legacy ==
Tilson has been inducted into the Manchester City Hall of Fame. In 1977 the Manchester City Council named eleven streets in a new estate in Moss Side after famous City players including Tilson. He is listed as the twenty-eighth greatest ever City player on the Time website and eighteenth in Ian Penney's book The Essential History of Manchester City.

== Honours ==
Manchester City

- Football League First Division: 1936–37
- Football League Second Division: 1927–28
- FA Cup: 1933–34
- FA Charity Shield: 1937
