= 1956 FA Charity Shield =

- Event: FA Charity Shield
Manchester City	Manchester United
0	1
- Date: 24 October 1956
- Venue: Maine Road, Manchester
- Attendance: 30,495

The 1956 FA Charity Shield was the 34th FA Charity Shield, an annual football match held between the winners of the previous season's Football League and FA Cup competitions. The match was contested by Manchester United, who had won the 1955–56 Football League, and Manchester City, who had won the 1955–56 FA Cup, at Maine Road, Manchester, on 24 October 1956. Manchester United won the match 1–0, with Dennis Viollet scoring the winning goal. United goalkeeper David Gaskell made his debut for the club during the game, taking the place of injured goalkeeper Ray Wood, and, at the age of 16 years and 19 days, became the youngest player ever to play for the club.

This game was the first competitive floodlit Manchester derby. The game was a break with tradition as Charity Shield matches were typically played at the home ground of the league champions, but as Old Trafford had yet to install lights, the game was played at Maine Road. Prior to this, the first floodlit Manchester derby was played on 26 February 1889 at the Belle Vue Athletic Ground. The match was played in aid of the Hyde Coal Mine disaster.

== Match details ==
24 October 1956

Manchester City	0–1	Manchester United
		Viollet 75'

Maine Road, Manchester
Attendance: 30,495

Manchester City	Manchester United

1	(England) John Savage
2	(England) Bill Leivers
3	(England) Roy Little
4	(Wales) Roy Clarke
5	(Scotland) Dave Ewing
6	(Wales) Roy Paul (c)
7	(England) Jack Dyson
8	(England) Joe Hayes
9	(England) Don Revie
10	(Scotland) Bobby Johnstone
11	(Republic of Ireland) Paddy Fagan
Manager:
(Scotland) Les McDowall

GK	1	(England) Ray Wood	(substituted off) 45'
RB	2	(England) Bill Foulkes
LB	3	(England) Roger Byrne (c)
RH	4	(England) Eddie Colman
CH	5	(England) Mark Jones
LH	6	(England) Duncan Edwards
OR	7	(England) Johnny Berry
IR	8	(Republic of Ireland) Billy Whelan
CF	9	(England) Tommy Taylor
IL	10	(England) Dennis Viollet
OL	11	(England) David Pegg
Substitutes:
GK	12	(England) David Gaskell	(substituted on) 45'
Manager:
(Scotland) Matt Busby

== See also ==
- 1955–56 Football League
- 1955–56 FA Cup
- 2011 FA Community Shield – contested by the same teams
