= Roy Clarke (footballer) =

Welsh footballer & manager (1925–2006)

Personal information
- Full name: Royston James Clarke
- Date of birth: 1 June 1925
- Place of birth: Newport, Wales
- Date of death: 13 March 2006 (aged 80)
- Place of death: Sale, England
- Position: Winger

Youth career
- –1942: Albion Rovers

Senior career*
Years	Team	Apps	(Gls)
1942–1947	Cardiff City	39	(11)
1947–1958	Manchester City	349	(73)
1958–1959	Stockport County	25	(5)

International career
1948–1956	Wales	22	(5)

Managerial career
- 1963–1964: Northwich Victoria
- * Club domestic league appearances and goals

Royston James Clarke (1 June 1925 – 13 March 2006) was a Welsh footballer who played for Cardiff City, Manchester City, Stockport County and Wales as a winger.

An outstanding schoolboy sportsman, Clarke became a miner during the Second World War, playing amateur football in his spare time. He signed amateur forms with Cardiff City in 1942, becoming a professional when league football resumed after the war. Part of the Cardiff side which won promotion from Division Three (South) in 1946–47, he signed for Second Division Manchester City in May 1947, Cardiff receiving £12,000 for the player. Manchester City had just secured promotion with matches to spare, resulting in Clarke achieving an unusual feat of playing in three different divisions in consecutive matches.

Clarke was a Manchester City regular for the next decade, making 349 league appearances. He was part of the Manchester City team which reached consecutive FA Cup finals in the 1950s, winning in 1956. In 1958 Clarke moved to Stockport County, and later had a spell as manager of Northwich Victoria. After retiring from football he ran a sports shop, and subsequently returned to Manchester City, where he ran the social club for nearly 25 years. He died in 2006, after a long illness with Alzheimer's disease.

== Career ==
Roy Clarke was born in Newport, Monmouthshire, to a mining family. At school he excelled at sports, representing Wales in a schoolboy baseball international, and winning a local table tennis championship. Upon leaving school Clarke followed his father's career path and became a miner, as one of the Bevin boys. In his free time he played for a local amateur football team, Albion Rovers. Here he was spotted by Cardiff City, who signed him as an amateur in December 1942. In 1945 he received his first taste of playing against top-class opposition, a touring Dynamo Moscow. His team suffered a heavy defeat; the match finished 10–1 to the Soviets. The following year he represented the Welsh national team for the first time, playing in a "Victory international" against Ireland.

Clarke played as an outside-left for Cardiff City in 39 league matches, scoring 11 goals (1942–1947). When league football resumed after the war, Clarke was an integral part of the Cardiff City team which gained promotion from the Third Division in 1946–47. In May 1947 he transferred to newly crowned Second Division champions Manchester City, the fee £12,000. He made his debut in Manchester City's final match of the season, against Newport County, his home town club. Clarke made his next appearance in the First Division against Wolverhampton Wanderers on the opening day of the 1947–48 season, scoring his first goal for the club in the process. This meant he had completed the unusual feat of playing three different divisions of the Football League in three consecutive matches.

In the 1954–55 season Manchester City had success using a tactical system known as the Revie Plan, in which Don Revie was used as a deep-lying centre-forward. Clarke was one of the players to benefit from this system, with interplay between Clarke and Revie prominent. A long run in the FA Cup followed. Clarke scored the winning goal in a semi-final against Sunderland, heading in a Joe Hayes cross to send City to Wembley, but suffered a knee injury late in the match. After missing five matches Clarke returned to the starting line-up, but he aggravated the injury in the final league match of the season. The knee required an operation, causing him to miss the 1955 FA Cup Final.

Manchester City reached the FA cup final again the following season, Clarke played all but one match of the cup run, and supplied a cross for the winning goal in both the quarter-final (against Everton), and the semi-final (against Tottenham Hotspur). Manchester City played Birmingham City in the final, and were viewed as underdogs, despite reaching the final the previous year. Early in the match Clarke exchanged passes with Don Revie, who set up Joe Hayes for Manchester City to take the lead with less than three minutes played. Birmingham equalised in the first half, but two second half goals meant Manchester City beat Birmingham City 3–1. The final is most well known for being the match where goalkeeper Bert Trautmann continued play after breaking his neck.

By the 1957–58 season injuries had taken their toll upon Clarke and first team appearances were sparse, though he became one of the first players to gain from a new benefit; upon completing ten years' service for the club he was given a cheque for £1,000. After a pre-season game against Borussia Dortmund, which Clarke had played despite carrying a knee injury, manager Les McDowall informed him that he would soon be made available for transfer, but an injury to Jack Dyson meant Clarke was retained for one more season. He made seven appearances in his final season at the club, the last in a 5–1 FA Cup defeat to West Bromwich Albion, in which he played centre-forward instead of his customary position on the wing. In total he played 349 league matches for Manchester City, scoring 73 goals. He had a brief spell as assistant coach in the latter part of his Maine Road career, but stepped down from the position to allow his former teammate Jimmy Meadows to take the position instead. In September 1958 he moved to Stockport County for £1,500, where he played 25 league matches, scoring 5 goals. He also won 22 full international caps for Wales.

== Non-playing career ==
He later managed Northwich Victoria for a brief period, before returning to Manchester, where he opened a sports shop in Fallowfield. Through his friendship with Bert Trautmann he gained a contract to become the first Adidas merchant in the area, but the shop closed a few years later as Clarke wished to concentrate upon activities at Manchester City. Clarke became the manager of the Manchester City social club in 1966; he and his wife Kathleen ran the social club together for nearly 25 years. The social club was open seven days a week, providing an opportunity for players, management and supporters to form closer bonds. It received praise in Arthur Hopcraft's 1968 book The Football Man, for providing a counterpoint to football clubs who "largely ignored [their fans] except when they were inside the ground". During his time at the social club Clarke was a founder of two other Manchester City organisations: the Development Association, which acts as a fund for ground improvements and youth development, and the Former Players' Association, which was co-founded with Paddy Fagan and Roy Little, Clarke serving as secretary. In 2004, he was inducted into the Manchester City Hall of Fame, receiving a lifetime achievement award. Towards the end of his life he suffered from Alzheimer's disease, and died on 13 March 2006, leaving a wife and three daughters.

== Honours ==
Manchester City

- FA Cup: 1955–56
