= 1956 FA Cup final =

Football match between Manchester City and Birmingham City

- Event: 1955–56 FA Cup
Manchester City	Birmingham City
3	1
- Date: 5 May 1956
- Venue: Wembley Stadium, London
- Referee: Alf Bond (Fulham)
- Attendance: 100,000

The 1956 FA Cup final was the final match of the 1955–56 staging of English football's primary cup competition, the Football Association Challenge Cup, better known as the FA Cup. The showpiece event was contested between Manchester City and Birmingham City at Wembley Stadium in London on Saturday 5 May 1956. Two-time winners Manchester City were appearing in their sixth final, whereas Birmingham City were seeking to win the competition for the first time, having lost their only previous final in 1931.

Each club needed to win five matches to reach the final. Manchester City's victories were close affairs, each settled by the odd goal, and they needed a replay to defeat fifth-round opponents Liverpool. Birmingham City made more comfortable progress: they scored eighteen goals while conceding only two, and won each match at the first attempt despite being drawn to play on their opponents' ground in every round. They became the first team to reach an FA Cup final without playing at home.

Birmingham City entered the match as favourites, in a contest billed as a contrast of styles. Watched by a crowd of 100,000 and a television audience of five million, Manchester City took an early lead through Joe Hayes, but Noel Kinsey equalised midway through the first half. Second half goals from Jack Dyson and Bobby Johnstone gave Manchester City a 3–1 victory. The match is best remembered for the heroics of Manchester City goalkeeper, Bert Trautmann, who continued playing on in the match despite breaking a bone in his neck in a collision with Birmingham City's Peter Murphy. Due to his heroics, the game is often referred to as "the Trautmann final".

== Route to the final ==
=== Manchester City ===
Round	Opposition	Score
3rd	Blackpool (h)	2–1
4th	Southend United (a)	1–0
5th	Liverpool (h)	0–0
5th	Liverpool (a)	2–1
6th	Everton (h)	2–1
Semi-final	Tottenham Hotspur (n)	1–0
Key: (h) = Home venue; (a) = Away venue; (n) = Neutral venue

As both Birmingham City and Manchester City were First Division clubs, they entered the competition in the third round. Manchester City's cup run started with a home tie against Blackpool. The visitors took the lead after only 10 seconds (their fastest goal ever), but midway through the match, fog enveloped Maine Road. The match was abandoned during the second half, immediately after City had scored an equalising goal, and replayed the following Wednesday; City won 2–1. In the fourth round Manchester City faced Southend United at Roots Hall. The Essex club's ground had only opened five months previously, and was suffering from drainage problems. Torrential rainfall meant that in the week before the match a trench was dug across the pitch, and sand added. Though Southend were a Third Division team, their familiarity with the uneven pitch meant the match was closely contested. Southend pressured the Manchester City goal, requiring Bert Trautmann to make several saves, but Joe Hayes scored the only goal of the game on a City counter-attack to earn a fifth-round tie against Liverpool.

In the fifth-round match, the teams saw out a 0–0 draw at Maine Road, and the match was replayed at Anfield. Goals from Jack Dyson and Bobby Johnstone gave Manchester City a 2–1 lead, but the game finished in controversial circumstances when the referee blew his whistle for full time as Liverpool's Billy Liddell was bearing down on goal. Liddell put the ball in the net, but unbeknown to him the goal did not count as the match was already over. In the quarter final Manchester City again played opposition from Liverpool, facing Everton at Maine Road. Trailing 1–0 at half-time after a Jimmy Harris goal, City overcame the deficit in the second half with goals from Hayes and Johnstone. Further controversy followed in the semi-final against Tottenham Hotspur, when in the final minutes of the match, with the score at 1–0 to Manchester City, Tottenham were denied a penalty after goalkeeper Trautmann grabbed forward George Robb's leg. No further goalscoring opportunities occurred, and City hung on for the victory.

=== Birmingham City ===
Round	Opposition	Score
3rd	Torquay United (a)	7–1
4th	Leyton Orient (a)	4–0
5th	West Bromwich Albion (a)	1–0
6th	Arsenal (a)	3–1
Semi-final	Sunderland (n)	3–0
Key: (h) = Home venue; (a) = Away venue; (n) = Neutral venue

Manager Arthur Turner called on his team to match their Third Division opponents Torquay United for fighting spirit and to produce a "90-minute performance". The players complied; leading 4–0 at half-time, they finished as comfortable 7–1 winners. In the fourth round, Leyton Orient, who had beaten Birmingham at the same stage four years earlier, posed more of a potential problem. In reality the win was equally comfortable: Eddy Brown added two goals to his hat-trick at Torquay. A tight local derby game followed on a snow-covered frozen pitch at The Hawthorns. In the first half, goalkeeper Gil Merrick and his defence did well to keep West Bromwich Albion out; Trevor Smith had to clear a Ronnie Allen header from under the crossbar. In the second half, Birmingham wasted several chances before a one-two with Brown allowed Peter Murphy to score from the edge of the penalty area.

In the sixth round, Birmingham faced Arsenal on a muddy pitch. In order to relieve the tension on the way to important matches, manager Turner used to encourage the players to sing. Scotsman Alex Govan's contribution, Harry Lauder's rousing "Keep right on to the end of the road", was adopted by his teammates. As the team coach approached Highbury with the windows wound down, the fans joined in, continuing their rendition during the game. After first-half goals from Gordon Astall and Murphy, Birmingham went 3–0 up through Brown with twenty minutes left. Two minutes later, Arsenal scored from 30 yards (27 m), Birmingham were unsettled, and Merrick needed to make a fine save from Vic Groves to prevent a second Arsenal goal. Turner felt the motivation from such a powerful song played a significant part in the day's victory.

Semi-final opponents Sunderland found Birmingham without "hard-man" left-half Roy Warhurst, who had injured a thigh against Arsenal, but in Jack Badham they had an effective replacement. The club's official history describes this as "probably the finest team performance against top class opposition ever produced" by a Birmingham team. They attacked from the kick-off and nullified Sunderland's pressure and the threat of Len Shackleton. Noel Kinsey scored early and the second goal came from a passing move down the left side finished by Astall. As Sunderland threw everyone forward, which left them open at the back, Brown picked up a long through ball and lobbed the goalkeeper. Astall said afterwards that he was surprised they had not scored five, and Brown wrote in his newspaper column:

Now Sunderland found out how hard it is to score against this terrific defence of ours. Not for nothing have we scored 18 goals against two (both of them freaks) conceded in five ties all away from home. What can I say to do justice to that brilliant goalkeeper Gil Merrick, to wonderful young Trevor Smith and to the matchless Jeff Hall and Ken Green? Once again they mixed the old cement and constructed that brilliant wall of a defence. Sunderland would have needed to call in a firm of demolition contractors to destroy it.

Birmingham City thus reached the final without playing a single tie at home, a feat which had never previously been accomplished.

== Build-up ==
The 1956 final was the second time that Birmingham had reached the showpiece match, having lost 2–1 to West Bromwich Albion in 1931. Manchester City were appearing in the final for the sixth time, and for the second consecutive year. They had won the cup twice previously (in 1904 and 1934), and had been beaten in the final three times (in 1926, 1933 and 1955). Though Birmingham had less pedigree in the competition, the press viewed them as favourites. The Daily Telegraph contrasted Birmingham's "dazzling Cup run" with the manner in which Manchester City "scraped through", describing the Midlanders as "firm favourites". Interviews with players were typically bullish in tone. Manchester City's Bobby Johnstone opined that "Even an unbiased fan must regard Manchester City with favour", whereas Birmingham's Len Boyd gauged opinion quite differently: "They say Birmingham City are the hottest Cup favourites since Wolves crashed to Portsmouth in 1939".

During the 1950s the FA Cup final was the only football match to be televised nationally, resulting in heightened media attention for the players and clubs involved. The Players' Union successfully requested an additional £5 per man for appearing in a televised match, the first time such appearance money had been paid. Birmingham's players signed an exclusive contract with the BBC committing them to appear only on BBC programmes in the weeks leading up to the final, though their post-match celebration would be covered live by the regional commercial station ATV. The match itself attracted a television audience of five million, a high figure for the period.

Each club received 15,000 tickets for the final from the Football Association. Birmingham distributed their share by ballot among those supporters who had followed the team in the earlier rounds of the competition; 22,000 had attended the semi-final, so many thousands were left disappointed. Of the remaining tickets, 4,640 were allocated to the FA, 40,640 to County Associations, 20,090 to Football League clubs, 2,550 to FA members and 2,080 to the FA Council and stadium authorities. An enquiry into the black market held following the previous year's Cup Final meant ticket touts kept a lower profile than usual. However, in the week leading up to the game, the cheapest standing tickets, originally sold for 3s 6d, were changing hands in Birmingham for twenty times face value, or 35% of a manual worker's weekly earnings.

Manchester City spent the week preceding the final at a training camp in Eastbourne. Two days before the final Bert Trautmann, who had originally arrived in England as a prisoner of war, was named Footballer of the Year. Eight players who had played in the previous year's final were selected in the starting line-up. Press speculation in the run-up to the match pondered which of Don Revie and Bobby Johnstone would be selected, as Johnstone had been suffering from a calf problem. Bill Leivers was also an injury doubt due to a twisted ankle, and Billy Spurdle had a boil on his left arm lanced on the eve of the final. Consequently, the Manchester City line-up was not named until the morning of the match. Leivers was passed fit after having two pain-killing injections, but contrary to press expectations Spurdle missed out. This meant both Revie and Johnstone appeared in the line-up, Johnstone switching to outside right.

Birmingham also had doubts over their selection. Captain Len Boyd had for some time been suffering from a debilitating back problem, and relied on injections to keep him playing. He missed five of the last seven games of the season, but was passed fit on the Wednesday before the game. Fellow wing half Roy Warhurst had injured his thigh in the sixth-round match and played no further part in the season, while Badham, who damaged an ankle three weeks before the final, travelled on the Thursday with the rest of the team to their base in Twyford, Berkshire. Jeff Hall was struggling with a virus. When manager Turner announced his team on the eve of the match, Boyd took Warhurst's position at left-half, Badham, who had proved an able deputy in the semi-final, was omitted, and the inexperienced 22-year-old Johnny Newman came in on the right.

British Railways laid on 38 special trains to take some 19,000 supporters to London, the first of which arrived at St Pancras station from Manchester Central shortly after 3 a.m. For the first time, the official match programmes were on sale from early morning in an attempt to thwart sellers of unofficial versions. The Birmingham Mail set up a temporary press in a Wembley car park to produce a special edition of their Saturday sports paper, the Sports Argus, on blue paper rather than the usual pink. As the teams prepared in the dressing rooms, the crowd was led in communal singing, including songs with resonance for each of the two teams, "She's a lassie from Lancashire" and "Keep right on to the end of the road", and the hymn "Abide with Me", traditionally sung before every FA Cup final. As the teams emerged from the tunnel, Manchester City captain Roy Paul seized one last opportunity to stir emotion within the players by stopping, raising his fist and shouting "If we don't fucking win, you'll get some of this".

== Match ==
=== Summary ===
Both teams employed the formation typical of the era: two full backs, a centre half, two wing halves, two outside forwards, two inside forwards and a centre forward. However, their tactical approaches differed. Birmingham, described by The Times as using "iron determination, powerful tackling and open direct methods", employed the traditional English approach of getting the ball to the outside-forwards as quickly as possible, whereas Manchester City adopted tactics inspired by the Hungarian team which had soundly beaten England at Wembley three years before. The system involved using Don Revie in a deeper position than a traditional centre-forward in order to draw a defender out of position, and was therefore known as the "Revie Plan". As both teams' first-choice colours were blue, each team wore their change strip to prevent confusion. Manchester City therefore wore maroon stripes, and Birmingham City wore white.

Birmingham won the toss and Manchester City kicked off. The Birmingham goal came under pressure almost immediately. Within a minute a far post cross from Roy Clarke narrowly eluded Hayes. Two corners followed, the second resulting in a shot by Roy Paul. The next attack, in the third minute, resulted in the opening goal. Revie began the move, exchanging passes with Clarke, and back-heeling for the unmarked Hayes to sweep the ball past Gil Merrick to put Manchester City ahead. Birmingham's confidence was shaken, resulting in a series of Manchester City corners and a chance for Hayes, but they fought back to equalise in the 15th minute. Astall slipped the ball to Brown, who helped it forward. It rebounded off a Manchester City defender into the path of Welsh international inside‑forward Noel Kinsey, who fired home via Trautmann's far post. For the remainder of the first half Birmingham had most of the play, exerting pressure on Manchester City full-back Leivers, but were unable to make a breakthrough. Though Birmingham put the ball in the net twice, Brown was adjudged to be offside on both occasions. With Warhurst missing and Boyd out of position and not fully fit, Birmingham's strength and balance was disrupted, leaving them particularly vulnerable to Manchester City's unconventional style.

During the half-time interval, a row erupted between the Birmingham manager and some of his players about their fitness; in the Manchester City dressing room, a heated exchange took place between Barnes and Revie. Barnes had played defensively in the first half to counter the threat of Peter Murphy, but Revie urged him to play further forward. Meanwhile, manager Les McDowall exhorted his players to keep possession and make their opponents chase the ball.

The period immediately after half‑time saw few chances, but then, after just over an hour's play, Manchester City regained their stride and suddenly went two goals ahead. A throw-in to Revie led to interplay on the right wing involving Barnes, Dyson, and Johnstone, resulting in a through-ball which put Dyson clear of the defence to score. Two minutes later, Trautmann collected the ball at the end of a Birmingham attack and kicked the ball long to Dyson, over the heads of the retreating Birmingham players. Dyson flicked the ball on to Bobby Johnstone, who scored Manchester City's third, becoming the first player ever to score in consecutive Wembley finals in the process.

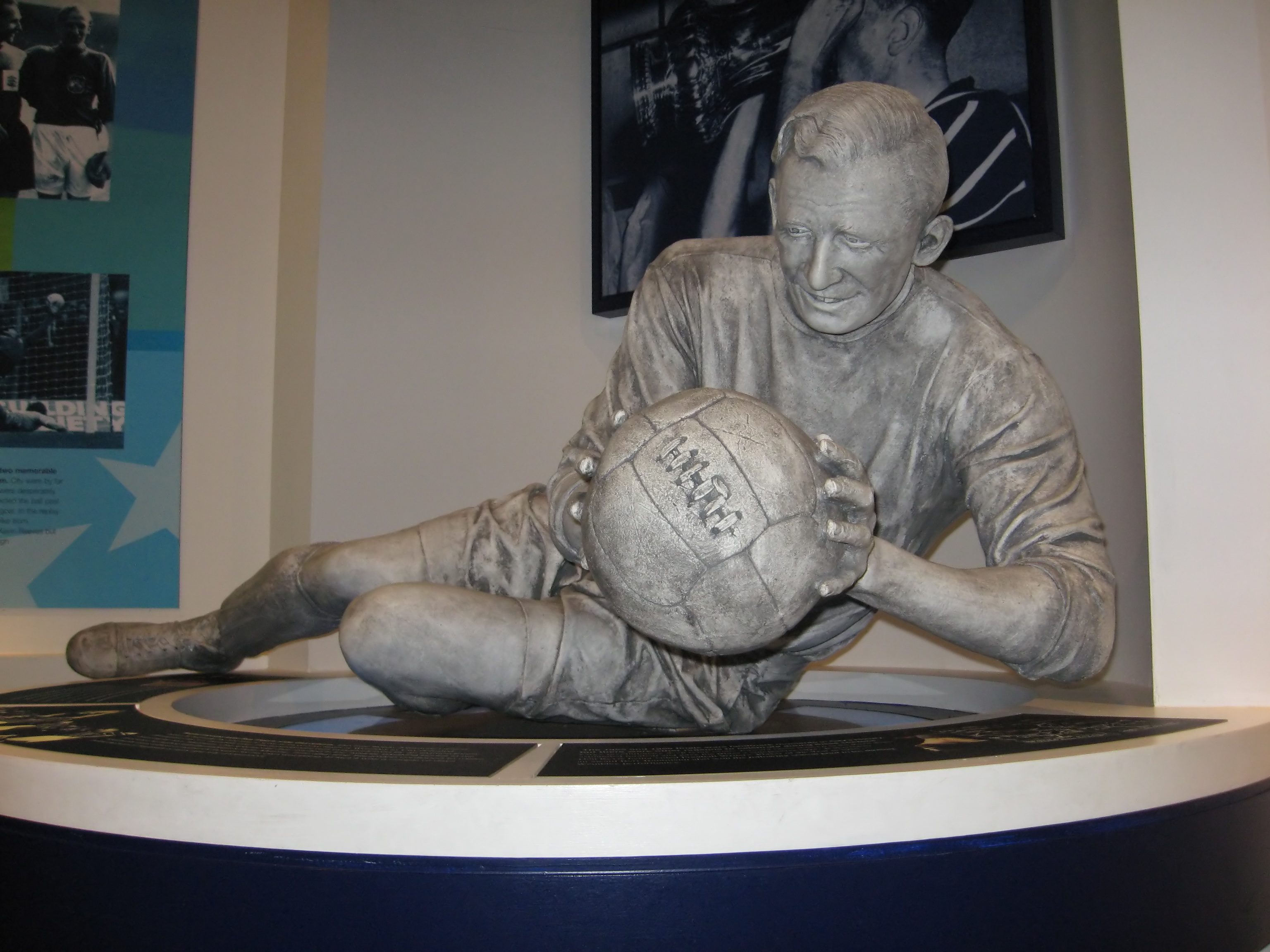
Bert Trautmann played the full match despite suffering a serious injury.

With 17 minutes remaining, a Birmingham chance arose when Murphy outpaced Dave Ewing. Goalkeeper Trautmann dived at the feet of Murphy to win the ball, but in the collision Murphy's right knee hit Trautmann's neck with a forceful blow. Trautmann was knocked unconscious, and the referee stopped play immediately. Trainer Laurie Barnett rushed onto the pitch, and treatment continued for several minutes. No substitutes were permitted, so Manchester City would have to see out the game with ten men if Trautmann was unable to continue. Captain Roy Paul felt certain that Trautmann was not fit to complete the match, and wished to put Roy Little in goal instead. However, Trautmann, dazed and unsteady on his feet, insisted upon keeping his goal. He played out the remaining minutes in great pain, with the Manchester City defenders attempting to clear the ball well upfield or into the stand whenever it came near. Trautmann was called upon to make two further saves to deny Brown and Murphy, the second causing him to recoil in agony due to a collision with Ewing, which required the trainer to revive him.

No further goals were scored, and the referee blew for full time with the final score 3–1 to Manchester City. As the players left the field, the crowd sang a chorus of "For he's a jolly good fellow" in tribute to Trautmann's bravery. Roy Paul led his team up the steps to the royal box to receive Manchester City's third FA Cup. Trautmann's neck continued to cause him pain, and the Duke of Edinburgh commented on its crooked state as he gave Trautmann his winner's medal. Three days later, an examination revealed that Trautmann had broken a bone in his neck.

=== Details ===
5 May 1956
15:00 BST

Manchester City	3–1	Birmingham City
Hayes 3'; Dyson 62'; Johnstone 64'		Kinsey 15'

Wembley Stadium, London
Attendance: 100,000
Referee: Alf Bond (Fulham)

Manchester City:				Birmingham City:
Goalkeeper	1	Bert Trautmann		Goalkeeper	1	Gil Merrick
Full back	2	Bill Leivers		Full back	2	Jeff Hall
Full back	3	Roy Little		Full back	3	Ken Green
Half back	4	Ken Barnes		Half back	4	Johnny Newman
Half back	5	Dave Ewing		Half back	5	Trevor Smith
Half back	6	Roy Paul		Half back	6	Len Boyd
Forward	7	Bobby Johnstone		Forward	7	Gordon Astall
Forward	8	Joe Hayes	Match rules:	Forward	8	Noel Kinsey
Forward	9	Don Revie	90 minutes normal time.	Forward	9	Eddy Brown
Forward	10	Jack Dyson	30 minutes extra-time if scores are level.	Forward	10	Peter Murphy
Forward	11	Roy Clarke	Replay if scores still level.	Forward	11	Alex Govan
			No substitutes.
Manager		Les McDowall		Manager		Arthur Turner

== Post-match ==
Trautmann attended the evening's post-match banquet (where Alma Cogan sang to the players) despite being unable to move his head, and went to bed expecting his injury to heal with rest. As the pain did not recede, the following day he went to St George's Hospital, where he was told he merely had a crick in his neck which would go away. Three days later, he got a second opinion from a doctor at Manchester Royal Infirmary. An X-ray revealed he had dislocated five vertebrae in his neck, the second of which was cracked in two. The third vertebra had wedged against the second, preventing further damage which could have cost Trautmann his life. Trautmann's convalescence took several months, resulting in him missing a large part of the 1956–57 season.

When Manchester City's train from London reached Manchester, the team were greeted by cameras from Granada TV and an open-top bus. They embarked on a journey from London Road station to the town hall in Albert Square, taking a route along some of Manchester's main shopping streets. The size and spirit of the crowds led the Manchester Evening Chronicle to make comparisons with VE Day. The boisterousness of the crowds in Albert Square meant the Lord Mayor struggled to make his speech heard above chants of "We want Bert". After the civic reception at the Town Hall and a banquet at a Piccadilly restaurant, the team returned to the open-top bus and headed to Belle Vue Pleasure Gardens, near the club's former home of Hyde Road in east Manchester, where the Chronicle held a function.

An estimated 10,000 people met the Birmingham City party on their return to Snow Hill station. The players, in the first of a convoy of four coaches, waved to the assembled crowds through the open sun-roof as they proceeded to the Council House, where the Lord Mayor welcomed them on behalf of the city. Len Boyd addressed the crowds from the balcony before the coaches continued through the city centre and back to St Andrew's, Birmingham City's home ground. The following Wednesday, a dinner was held to honour the club's achievements. Guests included the 84-year-old Billy Walton, who had joined the club in 1888, six members of Birmingham's 1931 cup final team, and a trade delegation from the Soviet city of Sverdlovsk.

Though the thousands gathered outside the Council House roared "No!" when Boyd said the team felt they had let the supporters down, there were recriminations concerning Birmingham's performance and team selection. The local press suggested that attempts to combat "Wembley nerves" had resulted in an "over-casual approach to the game". The row at half-time had done little for second-half morale, but speaking fifty years later, Gil Merrick placed the blame less on Boyd's questionable fitness than on a failure to discuss how to stop Revie. Alex Govan, convinced that "if Roy Warhurst had been fit then there would only have been one winner", blamed "bad team selection", saying that even without Warhurst he firmly believed "that if Badham had been in we would have won that game. He would never have given Don Revie the room to run the match." Warhurst himself thought the selection of Newman "meant the team had to adapt its style and in the end we used different tactics to those that had been successful all season". The match ball which was signed by both teams and presented to winning Captain Roy Paul has been on display at the Manchester City museum since 2003.
