= Roy Paul =

Welsh footballer

- Roy Paul in 1956

Personal information
- Full name: Roy Paul
- Date of birth: 18 April 1920
- Place of birth: Ton Pentre, Wales
- Date of death: 21 May 2002 (aged 82)
- Place of death: Treorchy, Wales
- Position: Defender

Youth career
- Ton Boys

Senior career*
Years	Team	Apps	(Gls)
1939–1950	Swansea Town	159	(11)
1950–1957	Manchester City	270	(9)
1957–1960	Worcester City		
1960	Brecon Corinthians		
1960–1961	Garw Athletic		
Total		429	(20)

International career
1948–1956	Wales	33	(1)

Managerial career
- Worcester City
- Brecon Corinthians
- Garw Athletic
- * Club domestic league appearances and goals

Roy Paul (18 April 1920 – 21 May 2002) was a Welsh professional footballer who played as a half-back for Swansea Town and Manchester City. He also represented the Welsh national team over 30 times and is regarded as one of Wales' best ever players.

Brought up in the Rhondda Valley, Paul became a miner after leaving school, but an offer of a professional contract from Swansea gave him the opportunity to leave the colliery. His football career was then disrupted by Second World War, during which he was a physical training instructor. After the war, Paul made his League debut, and spent four years playing first team football for Swansea, winning the Third Division South championship in 1948–49. Transfer listed after an abortive move to Colombian club Millonarios, Paul joined Manchester City for £19,500 in June 1950.

At Manchester City Paul spent seven years as captain, leading the club to successive FA Cup finals in 1955 and 1956, losing the first and winning the second. In 1957 he became player-manager of Worcester City, and subsequently wound down his career in his native South Wales, becoming a lorry driver. He died in 2002 aged 82.

== Club career ==
=== Early career ===
Paul was born on 18 April 1920 in Ton Pentre, Glamorgan, in the valleys of South Wales, and was one of 12 children. He attended Bronllwyn School in Gelli. Paul left school at 15, and like many boys from the Rhondda Valley he became a miner. While playing football for Ton Boys Club he was spotted by Swansea Town, for whom he signed first as an amateur, and then a month later as a professional. The Swansea captain was Bill Imrie, a former Scotland international. Paul named Imrie as a strong influence in his early career, particularly for instructing him in the fundamentals of good wing-half play. Paul played for Swansea's junior sides, but just as he was approaching the fringes of the first team, the league was suspended due to the outbreak of the Second World War.

At the start of the war Paul returned to the mines. He continued to represent Swansea in wartime leagues, and played for the senior team for the first time in 1939. Paul struggled to readapt to mining life, and volunteered for the Marines in 1940. He served as a sergeant physical training instructor, primarily in Devon, though he also spent part of the war in India. When in Devon he played football as a guest for Exeter City, and when in Wales he played wartime football for Swansea. Once the war was over Paul finally made his League debut for Swansea, having lost six years of his career to the war.

The Swansea coach in the immediate post-war period was Frank Barson, a notoriously aggressive character who was known as "the centre-forward's graveyard" in his playing days. Barson instructed Paul in the art of tackling during lengthy practise sessions, and made him aware of the tricks that a wily opponent could use to gain the upper hand in a physical battle. Paul went on to make 159 league appearances for Swansea in a four-year period, winning the Third Division South championship in 1948–49. An impressive appearance against top-flight club Arsenal in a 1950 FA Cup match resulted in the Londoners making an offer for the player, but Swansea turned it down.

Later that year, Paul received an offer of a trial with Colombian club Millonarios. Colombian clubs, who were not required to pay transfer fees as their governing body was not affiliated with FIFA, made similar offers to several British players. Paul was one of seven to make the trip to South America. Millonarios offered him a £3,000 signing on fee and £150 per month, far in excess of the £12 per week maximum wage in British football. Once in Colombia, Paul found himself unimpressed by the conditions. He remarked in his autobiography that seeing football pitches surrounded by barbed wire put him in mind of "a concentration camp, or maybe the monkey-house in the zoo". Paul stayed in Bogota for only ten days, without playing a single match. Swansea were angered by Paul's trip, and transfer-listed him upon his return. As a result, he transferred to Manchester City for £19,500, a British record for a half-back. Ken Barnes joined the club on the same day. The two became close friends; Paul was best man at Barnes' wedding.

=== Manchester City ===
Paul joined a Manchester City side which had just been relegated to the Second Division, and were thus playing at the same level as Swansea. Paul made his debut for the club on the opening day of the 1950–51 season, a 4–2 victory against a Preston North End side featuring Tom Finney. Manchester City went ten matches unbeaten at the start of the season, until a 4–3 defeat at Doncaster Rovers, where City blew a 3–0 half-time lead. Paul played in all but one match that season, becoming club captain and helping his club win promotion, as runners-up behind champions Preston. Writer HD Davies, under his pen name Old International, attributed much of City's cohesive play over the season to the addition of Paul to the side.

Promotion meant Paul was playing club football at the highest level for the first time. For the next three seasons, his club languished in the lower reaches of the league table. During one spell of particularly poor form in 1953, newspapers wrote of a feud between Paul and his team-mate Ivor Broadis. Paul was critical of Broadis, a talented inside-forward, but one who in Paul's view did not exert sufficient effort when defending. In the 1954–55 pre-season a new tactic was introduced which would change the direction of the club. Inspired by the Hungary team which had beaten England 6–3 the previous year, the club's reserves had used a tactical system in which Johnny Williamson was used as a deep-lying centre-forward, resulting in a lengthy unbeaten run. Manchester City manager Les McDowall decided to try the system at first team level, using Don Revie in the centre-forward role. Henceforth the system became known as The Revie Plan. The opening match of the season resulted in a 5–0 defeat at the hands of Preston North End. The following match the system was tweaked with Ken Barnes picked in place of John McTavish. City beat Sheffield United 5–2, and the system was retained for the remainder of the season. Paul's tactical role was relatively unchanged compared to that of some of his team-mates, but as captain he was responsible for retaining the cohesion of his players. The Manchester Guardian regarded Paul to be well suited to the system, calling it "a strategy which shows off to perfection the strength and maturity of Paul among his younger defenders".

Using the new system, results improved. In September 1954 City beat Arsenal to go top of the league, though not without personal cost for Paul, as an elbow from Arsenal's Tommy Lawton resulted in the loss of four teeth. City could not sustain their title challenge, finishing seventh, but Paul's team enjoyed a successful run in the FA Cup, reaching the final, where they faced Newcastle United. An early goal by Jackie Milburn and an unfortunate injury to Jimmy Meadows on 18 minutes left City playing with 10 men and gave them an uphill task. Paul took the responsibility of changing tactics: "Like certain generals I believe that in dire emergency it is often better to attack. I clapped my hands and yelled "Let's show these Geordies the stuff that's taken us to Wembley"". The performance in the remainder of the first half was improved, resulting in an equalising goal by Bobby Johnstone, but in the second half Newcastle scored twice to win 3–1. Publicly, Paul vowed to take his team to Wembley again, but privately he blamed himself for the defeat, questioning whether he had failed as captain.

The following season the club surpassed the achievements of the previous season, finishing fourth in the league and again reaching the FA Cup final, this time facing Birmingham City. Conscious that early nerves had affected his team in 1955, in the dressing room he focussed on instilling each member of his team with confidence. This time it was Manchester City who scored an early goal, and with City leading in the second half Paul told his men to keep the ball in play as much as possible in order to tire out the Birmingham players. Then German goalkeeper Bert Trautmann badly hurt his neck in a collision with Peter Murphy. Paul instructed Roy Little to take Trautmann's place, but Trautmann insisted that he would keep playing. Then Manchester City held on for the victory, and Paul collected the trophy from Queen Elizabeth II. X-rays later revealed that Trautmann had played on with a broken neck. Paul took the match ball from the final as a souvenir, and gave it to his son.

After the cup win Paul played one more season for Manchester City. In the summer of 1957 he was offered a new contract, but instead retired from the professional game aged 37, citing loss of pace due to age as the deciding factor. His final appearance for the club came on 22 April 1957 against Everton. In total he made 293 appearances for Manchester City, scoring 9 goals.

Upon finishing his professional career, Paul returned to the Rhondda Valley, and settled in Gelli. He continued to play at semi-professional level, joining Worcester City, who paid him £20 a week and loaned him a car. Paul made 124 appearances for Worcester between 1957 and 1960, including a three-month spell as player-manager. In 1959 he was part of the Worcester side which knocked Liverpool out of the FA Cup. He then moved to Brecon Corinthians, and later Garw Athletic, where he ended his career.

== Post-playing life ==
After the end of his football career, he became a lorry driver. He died on 21 May 2002 in Treorchy aged 82, following a long illness with Alzheimer's disease, leaving a wife, Beryl, and two children, Robert and Christine. He is buried in Treorchy Cemetery.

== International career ==
Paul gained 33 caps for Wales. He did not gain any under-age caps, as in his era Wales did not field an under-23 team. He received his first cap in October 1948, in a 3–1 defeat against Scotland. His only international goal came in a 5–1 win against Belgium in November 1949. In October 1955 Paul was part of the Wales team that beat England 2–1, the first Welsh victory against England in 18 years. Six months later Wales faced Ireland in their final match of that season's British Home Championship. Wales were leading 1–0 when a handball by Danny Blanchflower gave Wales a penalty. Paul took the kick, but it was saved by Norman Uprichard. Paul's failure cost Wales victory, as Jimmy Jones equalised in the second half and the match finished 1–1. A draw in the remaining fixture between Scotland and England meant that the miss also denied Wales victory in the tournament. Instead, for the first and only time there was a four-way tie. Paul did not play for Wales again.

== Playing style ==
Roy Paul played as a half-back, with the exact position varying during his career. At Swansea he was primarily used as a right-half, but when he joined Manchester City manager Les McDowall switched him to the left, a position which Paul preferred despite being right-footed. Internationally, he represented Wales in all three half-back positions over the course of his career.

Paul had a reputation as a physically tough player and inspirational captain. Team-mate Ken Barnes described him as a player who was "more about power than guile", and called him a "born leader" who was "brilliant in the air". Paul's approach to captaincy was to ensure that every player gave as much effort as possible, mixing the respect of his colleagues with the occasional attempt to frighten them into action; in the tunnel prior to the 1956 FA Cup Final his last action before leading out his team was to hold up his fist and shout "If we don't fucking win, you'll get some of this".

At Manchester City he was occasional penalty taker, but his success rate was not high and he was relieved when Don Revie joined the club and took the responsibility for penalties, commenting that "the only reason I took them was because no-one else fancied it".

== Honours ==
Manchester City

- FA Cup: 1955–56; runner-up: 1954–55
