= Ken Barnes (English footballer) =

English footballer and manager

Personal information
- Full name: Kenneth Herbert Barnes
- Date of birth: 16 March 1929
- Place of birth: Small Heath, Birmingham, Warwickshire, England
- Date of death: 13 July 2010 (aged 81)
- Place of death: Macclesfield, Cheshire England
- Position: Wing half

Youth career
- Moor Green
- Birmingham City
- Bolton Wanderers

Senior career*
Years	Team	Apps	(Gls)
1947–1950	Stafford Rangers		
1950–1961	Manchester City	258	(18)
1961–1965	Wrexham	132	(24)
Total		390	(42)

Managerial career
- 1961–1965: Wrexham
- 1965–1969: Witton Albion
- 1970: Bangor City
- * Club domestic league appearances and goals

Kenneth Herbert Barnes (16 March 1929 – 13 July 2010) was an English footballer. He played as a half back for Manchester City and Wrexham. On the books of Birmingham City as a youth, Barnes began his football career at amateur level. Upon completion of his national service in 1947 he joined semi-pro Stafford Rangers.

A transfer to Manchester City in 1950 meant Barnes turned professional, but his pro career had a slow start, making only one first team appearance in four years. He broke into the first team in 1954, flourishing as part of the tactical system known as the Revie Plan. During this period he played in two consecutive FA Cup finals, as a loser in 1955 and a winner in 1956. After making 283 appearances for Manchester City he joined Wrexham as player-manager in 1961, guiding them to promotion in his first season. Barnes returned to Manchester City in 1970, and over more than two decades filled a variety of coaching roles, including overseeing the development of the youth team which won the 1986 FA Youth Cup.

He died on 13 July 2010.

== Early career ==
Barnes was born in the Small Heath area of Birmingham, in the shadow of St Andrew's, the home stadium of Birmingham City. Support for Birmingham City ran in the family; his uncle played for the club in the 1920s. In 1943, aged 14, he began work at the Post Office. He played football for the works team, and quickly received an invitation to play for Moor Green, one of the strongest amateur teams in the area. His performances for Moor Green resulted in interest from Birmingham City, and Barnes became part of their junior team, Birmingham City Colts. Barnes worked at the Post Office during the day, trained with Moor Green in the evening, and played for Birmingham City Colts at the weekend. However, the Colts stopped selecting Barnes after a clash of matches, in which Barnes chose to play for a local team instead of the Colts. Barnes then resumed playing for Moor Green.

After a few months Barnes gained a second opportunity with a professional club, joining the youth ranks at Bolton Wanderers. As with when he played for Birmingham, he trained with Moor Green and played for Bolton's youth team at the weekend. Upon turning 18, Barnes was called up for national service, and was based with the RAF at Stafford. He continued to play for Bolton when circumstances permitted it, but when the club made a formal request for his services the RAF refused. Upon completion of his national service Barnes joined semi-pro Stafford Rangers. He made his debut against Newport County on 14 June 1947, and continued to play for the club for the next three years.

== Manchester City ==
Barnes joined Manchester City after a £750 move from non-League Stafford Rangers on 6 May 1950. He did not feature in the first team on a regular basis for several years – his debut, against Derby County on 5 January 1952 was the only appearance he made in his first four years at the club.

In the 1953–54 season Barnes was playing for the Manchester City reserve team. Inspired by the Hungary team which had beaten England 6–3 the previous year, the reserves began using a tactical system in which Johnny Williamson was used as a deep-lying centre-forward. Barnes played as an attacking half-back in a similar vein to József Bozsik. Using the system the reserves achieved a lengthy unbeaten run. At the start of the following season Manchester City manager Les McDowall decided to try the system at first team level, using Don Revie in the centre-forward role. Henceforth the system became known as The Revie Plan. The opening match of the season resulted in a 5–0 defeat at the hands of Preston North End. Revie opined that the system required attacking half-backs to be successful, and that City's half backs, John McTavish in particular, were too defensive. To that end Barnes was picked for the following match in place of McTavish. City beat Sheffield United 5–2, and Barnes became an integral part of the team, playing all but one of the matches in the remainder of the season. However, he was not enamoured by the attention given to the Revie Plan by the press, describing it as "bollocks".

During Barnes' first full season in the first team Manchester City enjoyed a successful run in the FA Cup. As a top-flight team Manchester City entered the competition in the third round, facing Derby County. Barnes scored the opening goal in a 3–1 win, his first goal in professional football. A derby victory against Manchester United and a win against Luton Town followed, setting up a quarter-final against his boyhood heroes Birmingham City. Single goal victories against Birmingham and Sunderland gave City a place in the final, where they faced Newcastle United. However, hampered by the loss of Jimmy Meadows to injury after 18 minutes, City were beaten 3–1.

Manchester City reached the cup final again the following season, Barnes playing every match of the cup run. Manchester City beat Birmingham City 3–1, Barnes having a hand in the second goal. The final is most well known for being the match where goalkeeper Bert Trautmann continued play after breaking his neck.

By the late 1950s Barnes was one of the senior players in the side, and succeeded Roy Paul as captain when Paul retired in 1957. During the 1957–58 season Barnes became the third player to score a hat-trick of penalties in an English top-flight match, as part of a 6–2 defeat of Everton. At this time Barnes was the club's primary penalty taker, helping him to score 11 goals over the course of the season. In his later years at Manchester City, Barnes role as captain meant he had become a strong influence on younger players. A particularly notable example was Denis Law, who joined the club in 1960, the pair becoming lifelong friends.

Barnes never played international football, but was described by Denis Law as "the best uncapped wing-half ever to have played in English football". The closest he came to an international cap was being named as a reserve for a match against Wales in October 1957.

In the dressing room Barnes had a reputation as a practical joker, with Bert Trautmann a particular target for teasing. Known as "Beaky" to his teammates, Barnes was one of the chief organisers of social activities on away trips, along with Roy Paul. In eleven years at Manchester City Barnes made 283 appearances in all competitions, scoring 19 goals.

== Management and coaching ==
By 1961, age meant Barnes was no longer an automatic first team selection, so he sought a move into management. An opportunity arose at Wrexham in May 1961, and Barnes was appointed player-manager. In his first season the club gained promotion to the Third Division. During his tenure he oversaw the club's record victory, a 10–1 defeat of Hartlepool United. The club finished ninth in 1962–63, but were relegated to the Fourth Division the following season. Barnes remained at the club until 1965, when he resigned his post. By the time of his departure from the club he had made 132 appearances, scoring 24 goals.

After leaving Wrexham Barnes took a job outside football, working in sales for WalkerSteel owned by future Blackburn Rovers Benefactor Jack Walker. However, before long he received an offer to become manager of Witton Albion on a part-time basis. At Witton he created a team from a mixture of promising youngsters and ageing veterans. Players he signed included future European Cup winner Chris Nicholl and former greats Dennis Viollet and Bobby Johnstone.

On 27 August 1970, Barnes curtailed a brief spell as manager of Bangor City to return to Manchester City as a member of the coaching staff. When Malcolm Allison departed the club in 1973, Barnes was offered the role of caretaker manager, but, soured by his experiences at Wrexham, he turned it down. Instead he became assistant to the eventual managerial appointee Johnny Hart. Seven months later ill health forced Hart to step down. In the reorganisation that followed the appointment of Hart's replacement Ron Saunders, Barnes became chief scout, a role he retained for two decades until he was sacked by Peter Reid in 1991. In his role he oversaw the development of a large number of successful young players, including Paul Lake, David White and Steve Redmond, the stars of the Manchester City youth team which won the 1986 FA Youth Cup. In 1994, he returned to the club at the invitation of Francis Lee, who had recently become chairman. Barnes served in a part-time scouting position for a further six years.

Since 2000, Barnes had been involved in a youth football initiative in Malaysia with daughter Karen Barnes Ken Barnes Soccer Skills In 2004, Barnes was elected to Manchester City's Hall of Fame, and in 2005 to Wrexham Supporters' Association's Hall of Fame. Married with six children, he died in July 2010 from pneumonia aged 81. One of his sons, Peter Barnes, was also a professional footballer, who played for England, both Manchester clubs, West Bromwich Albion and Leeds United.

== Managerial statistics ==
Managerial record by team and tenure
Team	From	To	Record					Ref
Team	From	To	P	W	D	L	Win %	Ref
Wrexham	1 May 1961	1 February 1965	185	74	35	76	40.0	
Total			185	74	35	76	40.0	—

== Honours ==
Manchester City

- FA Cup: 1955–56; runner-up: 1954–55
