= 2011 FA Cup final =

English football match

2011 FA Cup Final
- The match programme cover.
- Event: 2010–11 FA Cup
Manchester City	Stoke City
1	0
- Date: 14 May 2011
- Venue: Wembley Stadium, London
- Man of the Match: Mario Balotelli (Manchester City)
- Referee: Martin Atkinson (West Yorkshire)
- Attendance: 88,643
- Weather: Sunny; 17 °C (63 °F)

The 2011 FA Cup final was the 130th final of the FA Cup, the world's oldest domestic football cup competition. The final took place on 14 May 2011 at Wembley Stadium in London in front of 88,643 spectators and a British television audience of more than eight million. The clubs contesting the final were Premier League clubs Manchester City and Stoke City. The match was Stoke City's first FA Cup final, and Manchester City's ninth.

As Premier League clubs, they entered the competition in the third round. Manchester City made an unconvincing start, contesting two replays against lower league opposition in the third and fourth rounds but gained momentum and kept three consecutive clean sheets en route to the final. Stoke City played one replay in the third round, before beating all opponents in a run which culminated in a 5–0 victory over Bolton Wanderers in the semi-final at Wembley Stadium – the biggest winning margin at Wembley since 1939. Manchester City entered the final as favourites, with Stoke City as underdogs.

Manchester City began the match the brighter of the two teams with the majority of possession and a number of shots forcing saves from goalkeeper Thomas Sørensen but the first half remained goalless. Stoke improved after the half-time interval but failed to score from their only shot on target in the 62nd minute, which was saved by goalkeeper Joe Hart after a one-on-one with striker Kenwyne Jones. In the 74th minute, Manchester City midfielder, Yaya Touré fired a loose ball in the Stoke City penalty area past goalkeeper Sørensen to give Manchester City the lead. Stoke attempted to equalise after Manchester City's goal without success and the final finished 1–0 with Manchester City claiming their fifth FA Cup. The result gave Manchester City their first major trophy for 35 years, ending the longest trophy drought in the club's history. Stoke City manager Tony Pulis said "Manchester City were the better team and deserved to win", but expressed "disappointment" at his team's display. Manchester City manager Roberto Mancini dedicated the victory to the Manchester City supporters, declaring, "I am happy for the fans, they deserved to win this Cup. For a long time they didn't win."

The medals were handed out by Prime Minister David Cameron. As winners, Manchester City won a place in the 2011 FA Community Shield and the 2011–12 UEFA Europa League but as they had already qualified for the UEFA Champions League via their league position, the Europa League place was given to Stoke City as runners-up. To celebrate their victory, Manchester City held an open-top bus parade on 23 May 2011, beginning at Manchester Town Hall and ending at the City of Manchester Stadium; it attracted a crowd of up to 100,000.

== Route to the final ==
=== Manchester City ===
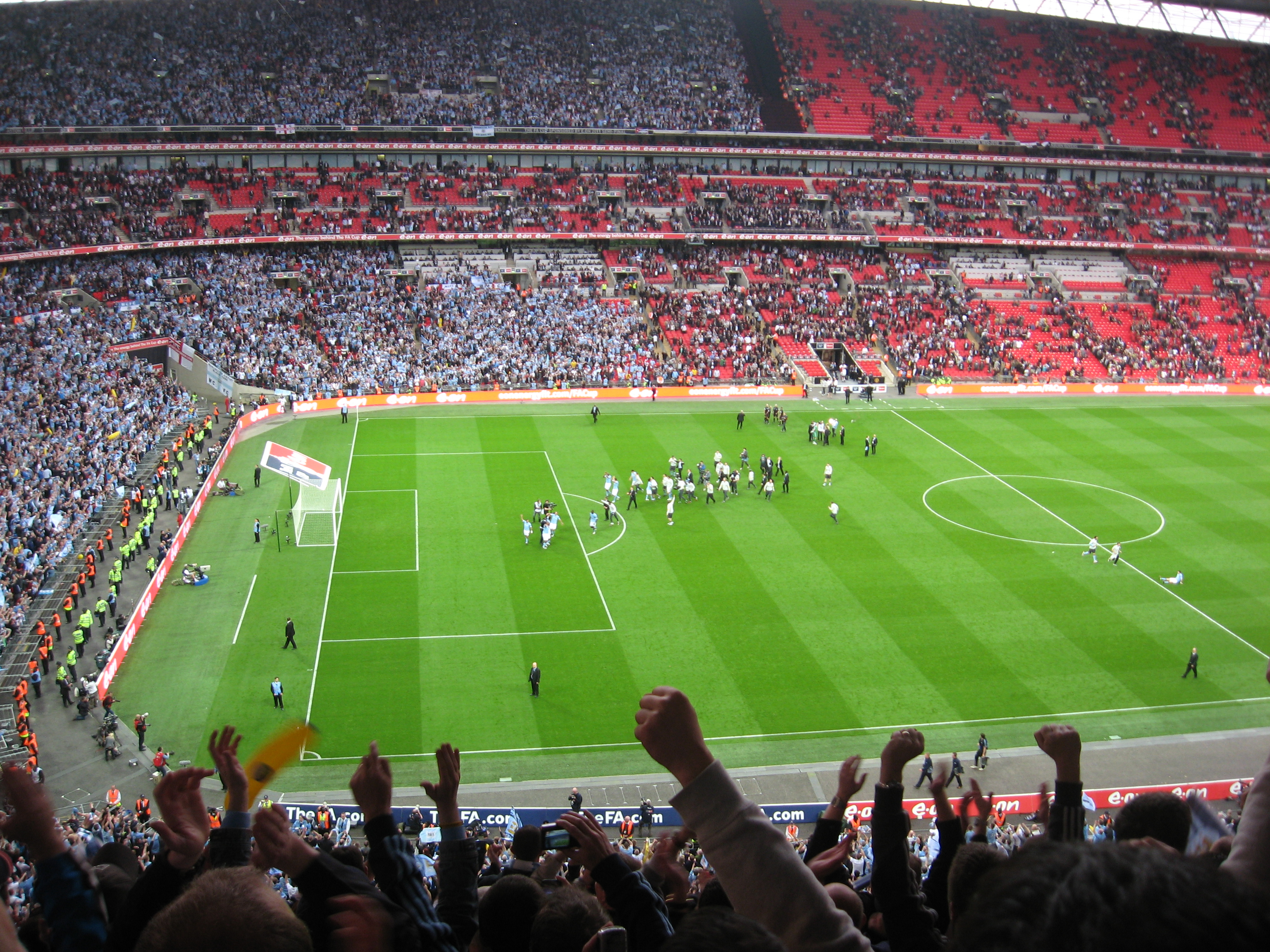
After the semi-final against Manchester United, which Manchester City won 1–0 to secure a place in the 2011 final.

As a Premier League team, Manchester City entered the competition in the third round. Their opening match was an away draw at Leicester City. Following a supporter campaign, Manchester City dedicated the match to former striker Neil Young, who was terminally ill. Young scored the winning goal when Manchester City and Leicester City met in the 1969 FA Cup Final. Manchester City fell behind after 46 seconds when Sol Bamba scored for Leicester following a corner. Manchester City took the lead by half-time through James Milner and Carlos Tevez, but Andy King equalised midway through the second half to make the score 2–2. The tie was replayed at the City of Manchester Stadium the following week. Tevez gave Manchester City the lead after quarter of an hour, but the lead was brief. Four minutes later, Paul Gallagher's penalty levelled the score, after Patrick Vieira had fouled Lloyd Dyer. Before half-time, two Manchester City goals in 90 seconds shifted the momentum of the match. In the second half, Tevez missed a penalty and a goal by Dyer made the score 3–2. Leicester then pushed for an equaliser, but instead Aleksandar Kolarov scored on a counter-attack to make the final score 4–2.

Round	Opposition	Score
3rd Replay	Leicester City (A); Leicester City (H)	2–2; 4–2
4th Replay	Notts County (A); Notts County (H)	1–1; 5–0
5th	Aston Villa (H)	3–0
6th	Reading (H)	1–0
Semi-final	Manchester United (N)	1–0

For the fourth round Manchester City were drawn against League One Notts County at Meadow Lane. On a pitch described by the BBC as "pudding-like", lower division County threatened an upset when Neal Bishop scored from a corner in the 59th minute. However, ten minutes from time Micah Richards crossed for Edin Džeko to score his first Manchester City goal, ensuring a replay at the City of Manchester Stadium. Notts County started the rematch brightly, but faded as the game progressed. The score remained 0–0 for most of the first half, but Vieira scored either side of half-time to give Manchester City a two-goal lead. From that point, the match proved less even, and Manchester City scored three more goals for a 5–0 win. From there on, City kept consecutive clean sheets on the way to winning the cup. Manchester City's fifth-round match was against Aston Villa at the City of Manchester Stadium. Villa manager Gérard Houllier rested several senior players, in contrast to a near full-strength Manchester City line-up. Manchester City took the lead after less than five minutes through Yaya Touré, and further goals from Mario Balotelli and David Silva resulted in a comfortable 3–0 win.

In the sixth round, Manchester City were again at home, and faced Reading, the only non-Premier League team left in the competition. Micah Richards scored the only goal, a header from a corner in the 73rd minute. In the semi-final, at Wembley Stadium, City defeated rivals Manchester United 1–0 with a Yaya Touré goal, and continued their FA Cup semi-final record of nine victories out of 11, reaching the FA Cup Final for the first time since 1981.

=== Stoke City ===
Round	Opposition	Score
3rd Replay	Cardiff City (H); Cardiff City (A)	1–1; 2–0 (aet)
4th	Wolverhampton Wanderers (A)	1–0
5th	Brighton & Hove Albion (H)	3–0
6th	West Ham United (H)	2–1
Semi-final	Bolton Wanderers (N)	5–0

Stoke, also a Premier League side, entered the competition at the third round stage, where they were drawn at home to Welsh side Cardiff City. Stoke City made seven changes to the team that played their previous match. Michael Chopra gave Cardiff an early lead, but Stoke's Tuncay Şanlı levelled the score just before half time. Stoke had a number of chances in the later stages of the match, but Cardiff held out for a replay. In the replay at the Cardiff City Stadium Stoke again used several reserves, changing all but one of the players from the previous league match. Few chances occurred during the game; the score was 0–0 after 90 minutes, prompting extra time. In the added period, Jonathan Walters scored twice to secure a 2–0 Stoke City win; the first goal was a header from a corner, the second a near-post rebound. Stoke City then travelled to fellow Midlands team Wolverhampton Wanderers for the fourth round, in one of five all-Premier League ties. Stoke defender Robert Huth was a central figure in the match. Ten minutes from time he gave Stoke a 1–0 lead with a header from a free-kick, but in the final minute he conceded a penalty for tripping Nenad Milijaš. Milijaš took the spot-kick himself, but his effort was saved by Thomas Sørensen.

Stoke's fifth-round match was at home against League One leaders Brighton & Hove Albion. Three first half goals by John Carew, Jonathan Walters, Ryan Shawcross led Stoke to a 3–0 win. Stoke then faced West Ham United in the sixth round. Stoke scored an early goal from a set-piece, when long throw-in specialist Rory Delap delivered the ball into the penalty area for Huth to score with a header. Controversial refereeing decisions then provoked the ire of both teams. When Frédéric Piquionne equalised for West Ham, the decision to award the goal infuriated Stoke; in controlling the ball Piquionne committed what Stoke manager Tony Pulis called a "stonewall" handball. West Ham themselves felt aggrieved in the first minute of the second half when Stoke were awarded a penalty. Matthew Etherington was adjudged to have been fouled by Scott Parker though, as the BBC correspondent wrote, "there appeared to be minimal contact". Robert Green saved Etherington's penalty to keep the score level. The winning goal also came from a set piece. Danny Higginbotham's free-kick was reached by Green but could not be stopped, and Stoke won 2–1 to reach the semi-finals for the first time since 1972. In the semi-final, Stoke beat Bolton Wanderers comfortably, winning 5–0. Stoke took a three-goal lead in less than half an hour after goals from Etherington, Huth and Kenwyne Jones. Walters scored twice in the second half to complete the win. The margin of victory was the biggest in an FA Cup semi-final since 1939, and secured Stoke's first ever FA Cup Final appearance. By reaching the final, Stoke qualified for the 2011–12 UEFA Europa League before the final, as Manchester City had beat Tottenham days before the final to secure fourth position in the Premier League and consequently Champions League qualification.

== Pre-match ==
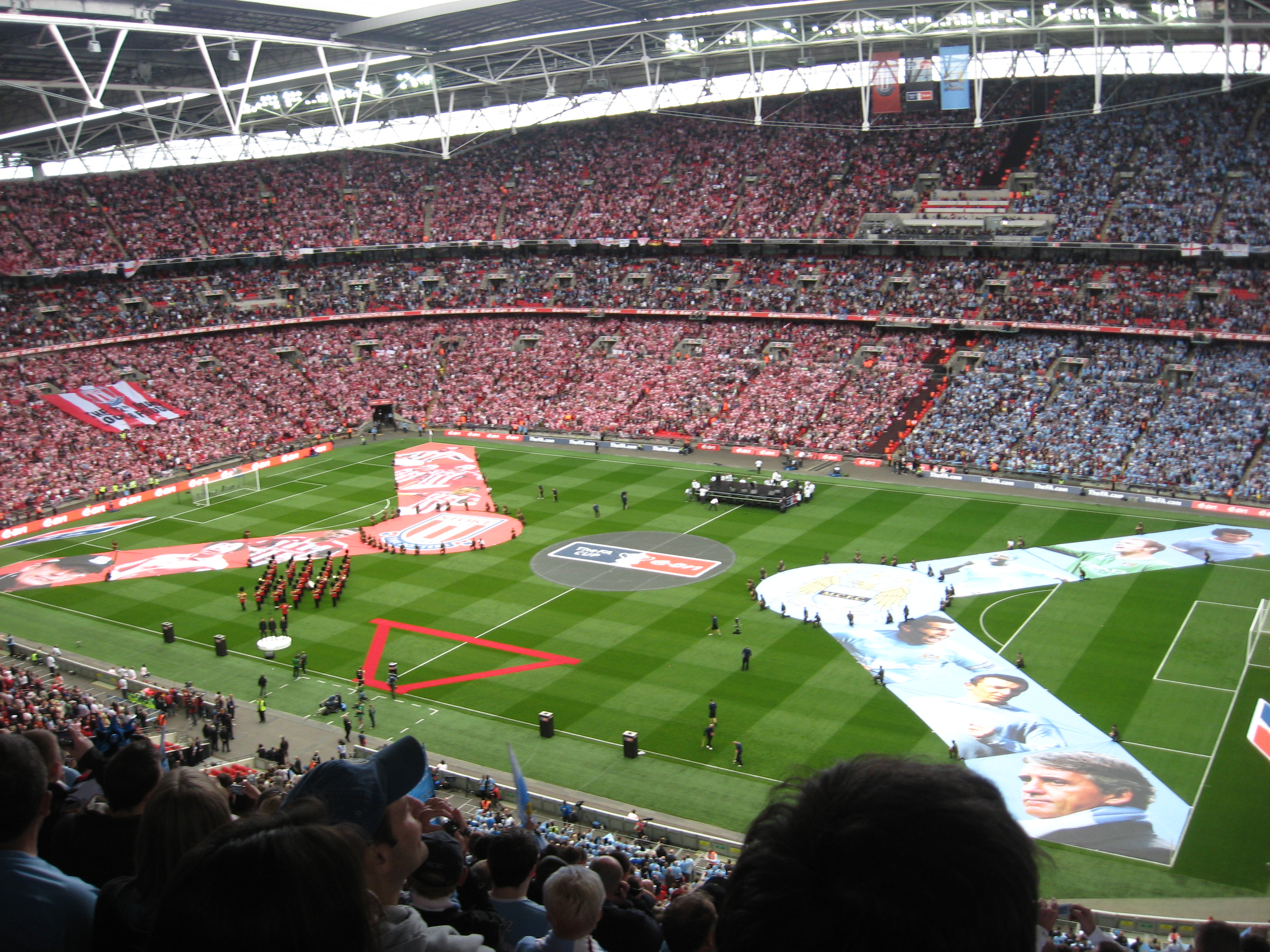
The pre-match rendition of Abide with Me.

Manchester City were appearing in the final for the ninth time. They had won the cup four times previously (in 1904, 1934, 1956 and 1969), and had been beaten in the final four times (in 1926, 1933, 1955 and 1981). Stoke City were making their first appearance in the final. Their previous best was participation in the semi-finals, which had occurred three times.

The 2011 final faced scheduling problems and the match clashed with top flight League fixtures for the first time since 1934, which disappointed football traditionalists. The 2011 UEFA Champions League Final was being hosted at Wembley on 28 May 2011 and UEFA rules stipulate that the host stadium for the final must not have a fixture played two weeks prior to the final. Therefore, the FA Cup final had to be moved forward, and for the first time since 1989 was played before the English football domestic season ended.

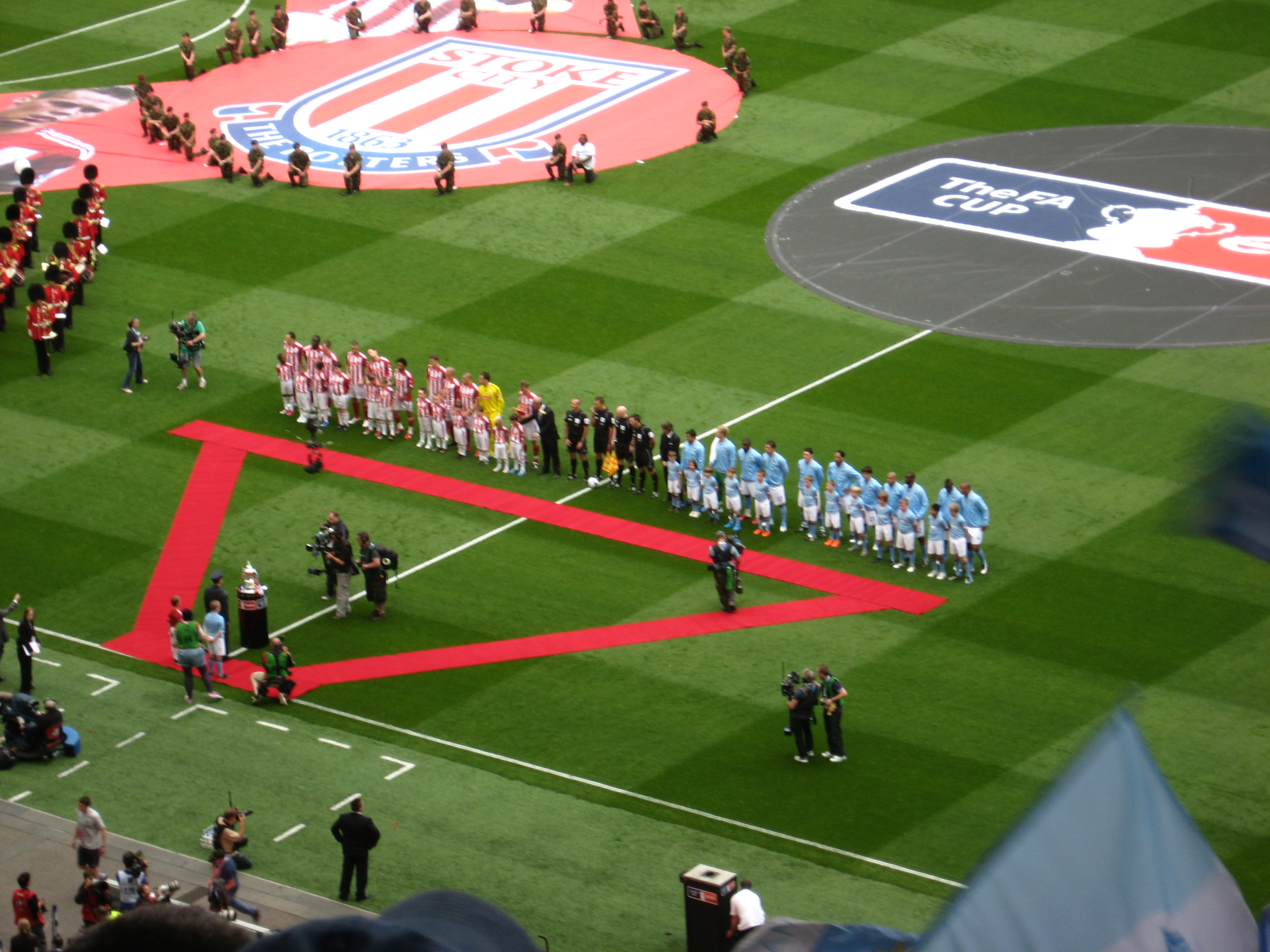
The teams line up before the match with Stoke City in red-and-white stripes and Manchester City in sky blue.

Many of the weekend's Premier League fixtures were rescheduled to avoid a clash with the final, with some kicking off at 12:45 on Saturday and others on Sunday. By coincidence, Manchester City and Stoke City were scheduled to meet in the league on cup final day. The league match was rearranged for the Wednesday after the final. This prompted criticism from Tottenham Hotspur manager Harry Redknapp, whose team was challenging Manchester City for a place in the 2011–12 Champions League. Redknapp stated that if Manchester City won the final, it would then be in Stoke City's interest to lose against Manchester City in the league match, as it would make Europa League qualification for Stoke more likely. Stoke City refuted this accusation strongly, but ultimately this scenario was avoided. Champions League qualification was settled four days before the final, when Manchester City beat Tottenham Hotspur 1–0 in a league match.

Both clubs received an allocation of approximately 25,000 tickets, fewer than the 32,000 received for the semi-finals. The allocation was enough for the 21,000 Stoke City season ticket holders, but not for Manchester City's 36,000 season ticket holders. Consequently, some supporters felt aggrieved at the lack of tickets, including Stoke City chairman Peter Coates who expressed his disappointment and suggested an allocation in the region of 30,000 for both clubs. Ticket prices for the final exceeded £100 for the first time. The most expensive tickets cost £115, an increase of 22 per cent on the previous season. The cheapest tickets available at £45, up £5 from 2010.

As for every match in the 2010–11 FA Cup, the ball for the final was provided by Nike-owned, Manchester-based sports equipment company Umbro. The Umbro Neo Pro features a 14-panel design, and is patterned in blue and red. The majority of the balls to be used in the game arrived on the previous Wednesday, while the ball to be used at kick-off was delivered to the stadium on the day of the game.

The traditional Cup Final hymn, "Abide with Me", was sung by Tenors Unlimited, a trio of male vocalists, and former X Factor contestant Stacey Solomon performed the national anthem, "God Save the Queen".

== Match ==
Match statistics
	Manchester City	Stoke City
Goals scored	1	0
Total shots	23	9
Shots on target	14	7
Ball possession	59%	41%
Corner kicks	8	7
Fouls committed	14	9
Yellow cards	0	2
Red cards	0	0

Stoke City went into their first FA Cup Final as underdogs according to their manager Tony Pulis, while Manchester City manager Roberto Mancini saw in-form Stoke's underdog tag as a risk for complacency from his side. There were fitness doubts over key players for both teams, Carlos Tevez for Manchester City, and Matthew Etherington for Stoke City, who suffered a hamstring tear only 17 days prior to the final, but both were able to start the match. However, Stoke City's underdog tag proved true as Mancini's Manchester City side had the better of the match, with a 59 per cent share of ball possession and 23 attempts on goal to Stoke City's nine, only one of which was on target.

Both teams were able to play in their respective home colours without any colour clash: Stoke City played in their red-and-white stripes, and Manchester City played in their sky blue colours with the Manchester coat of arms on their shirt numbers, keeping up a long-standing club tradition of wearing the city's coat of arms for cup finals.

=== Report ===
Manchester City set up in a 4–2–3–1 formation, with Mario Balotelli, David Silva and Yaya Touré playing behind lone striker Carlos Tevez, and Nigel de Jong and Gareth Barry in defensive midfield roles. Stoke City set up in a rigid 4–4–2 formation, with two wingers in Jermaine Pennant and Matthew Etherington to support strikers Kenwyne Jones and Jonathan Walters.

Manchester City started sprightly, managing to create some chances which forced saves from Stoke goalkeeper Thomas Sørensen and steady defending to keep Stoke City in the game in the first half. Yaya Touré unleashed a 30-yard strike in the 11th minute which went only inches wide of the top corner of the goal, while Mario Balotelli had a curling shot from the corner of the penalty area in the 24th minute which was destined for the goal but for a strong, one-handed save from Sørensen.

Stoke improved after the break, but Manchester City had a key opportunity in the 56th minute when a counter-attack led by Carlos Tevez, who drifted out to the right flank, allowed David Silva to find space outside the Stoke City penalty area. Tevez managed to pass to Silva, but Silva was guilty of over-elaboration instead of shooting first-time, and the Stoke City defence managed to regroup, dispossessing Silva before he could adjust himself to shoot at goal.

Only six minutes later, in the 62nd minute, Stoke had their key chance and only shot on target of the match with Kenwyne Jones in the 61st minute. A looping ball over the top of the Manchester City defence by Matthew Etherington allowed Jones a one-on-one, but he failed to convert, firing straight at goalkeeper Joe Hart with the ball ricocheting off both striker and keeper before bobbling to safety. Doubts over Matthew Etherington's fitness resurfaced when he was taken off in the 63rd minute, with Stoke City still in the game at 0–0 as it stood.

However, in the 74th minute, Sørensen was unable to prevent Yaya Touré's effort from ten yards when he pounced on a stray ball in the penalty area to shoot with his left foot past Sørensen in front of the Manchester City supporters. Stoke City attempted to get a goal back, resorting to direct long balls into the Manchester City penalty area but failed to create any concrete chances. Despite Yaya Touré clinching the winning goal, enigmatic striker Mario Balotelli – who claimed he had a "shit" season in a post-match interview – was named man of the match for his efforts.

=== Details ===
14 May 2011
15:00 BST

Manchester City	1–0	Stoke City
Y. Touré 74'	Report

Wembley Stadium, London
Attendance: 88,643
Referee: Martin Atkinson (West Yorkshire)

Manchester City	Stoke City

GK	25	(England) Joe Hart
RB	2	(England) Micah Richards
CB	4	(Belgium) Vincent Kompany
CB	19	(England) Joleon Lescott
LB	13	(Serbia) Aleksandar Kolarov
DM	34	(Netherlands) Nigel de Jong
DM	18	(England) Gareth Barry	(substituted off) 73'
CM	42	(Ivory Coast) Yaya Touré
RW	21	(Spain) David Silva	(substituted off) 90+2'
LW	45	(Italy) Mario Balotelli
CF	32	(Argentina) Carlos Tevez (c)	(substituted off) 88'
Substitutes:
GK	1	(Republic of Ireland) Shay Given
DF	5	(Argentina) Pablo Zabaleta	(substituted on) 88'
DF	38	(Belgium) Dedryck Boyata
MF	7	(England) James Milner
MF	11	(England) Adam Johnson	(substituted on) 73'
MF	24	(France) Patrick Vieira	(substituted on) 90+2'
FW	10	(Bosnia and Herzegovina) Edin Džeko
Manager:
(Italy) Roberto Mancini

GK	29	(Denmark) Thomas Sørensen
RB	28	(England) Andy Wilkinson	(yellow card) 76'
CB	17	(England) Ryan Shawcross (c)
CB	4	(Germany) Robert Huth	(yellow card) 40'
LB	12	(Republic of Ireland) Marc Wilson
RM	16	(England) Jermaine Pennant
CM	6	(Republic of Ireland) Glenn Whelan		(substituted off) 85'
CM	24	(Republic of Ireland) Rory Delap		(substituted off) 81'
LM	26	(England) Matthew Etherington		(substituted off) 62'
CF	9	(Trinidad and Tobago) Kenwyne Jones
CF	19	(Republic of Ireland) Jonathan Walters
Substitutes:
GK	27	(England) Carlo Nash
DF	5	(Wales) Danny Collins
DF	25	(Senegal) Abdoulaye Faye
MF	14	(England) Danny Pugh		(substituted on) 85'
MF	15	(Senegal) Salif Diao
MF	18	(England) Dean Whitehead		(substituted on) 62'
FW	22	(Norway) John Carew		(substituted on) 81'
Manager:
(Wales) Tony Pulis

Man of the match

- Mario Balotelli (Manchester City)

Match officials

- Assistant referees:
  - Adam Watts (Worcestershire)
  - Simon Beck (Bedfordshire)
- Fourth official: Lee Probert (Wiltshire)
- Reserve official: Jake Collin (Merseyside)

Match rules

- 90 minutes.
- 30 minutes of extra-time if necessary.
- Penalty shoot-out if scores still level.
- Seven named substitutes.
- Maximum of three substitutions.

== Post-match ==
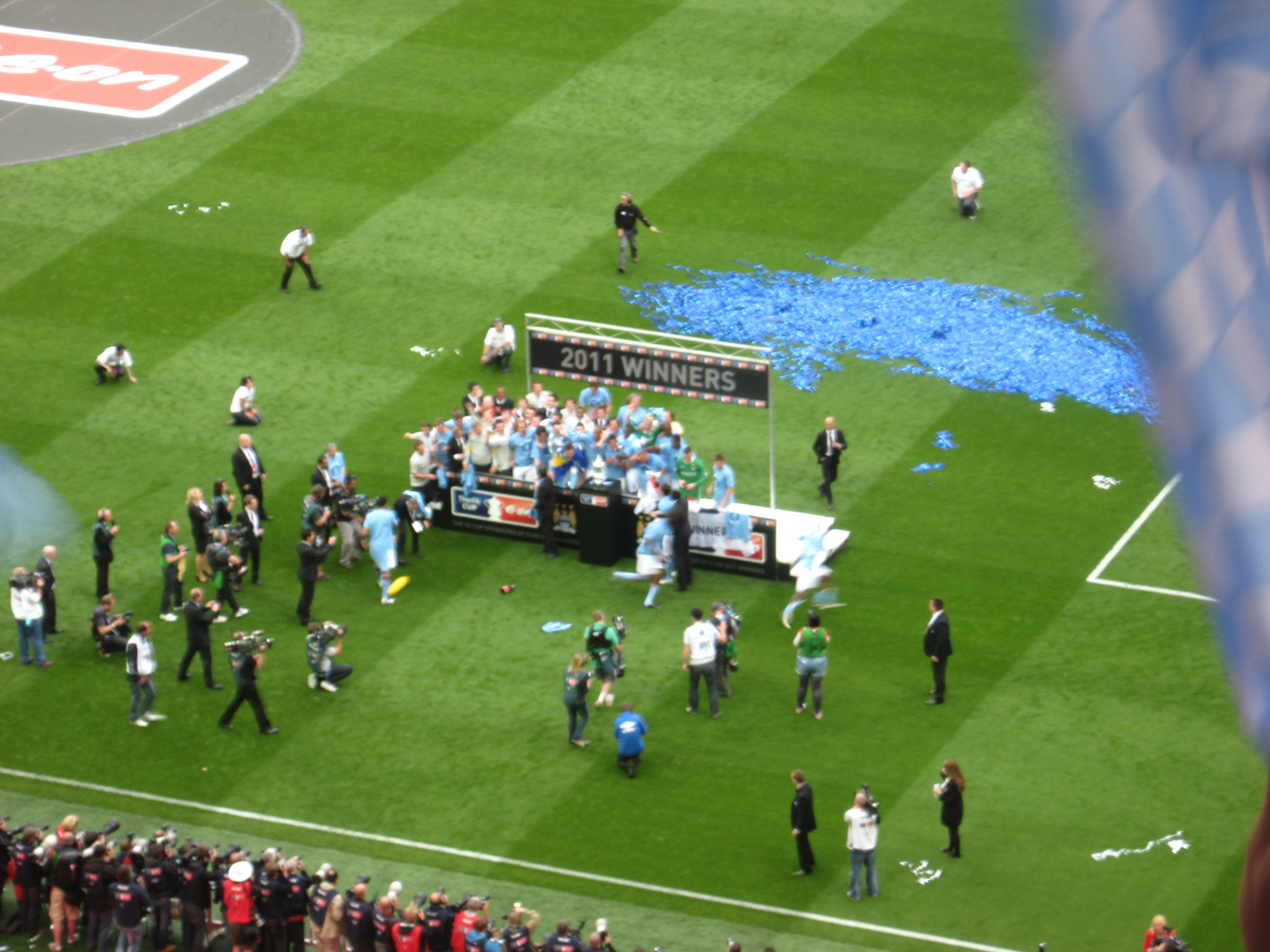
The Manchester City team celebrating winning the FA Cup

Tony Pulis commented after the game that "Manchester City were the better team" and that "they deserved to win the game", while Roberto Mancini dedicated the victory to the Manchester City supporters. Pundits Graham Taylor and Mark Lawrenson agreed that Manchester City deserved to win but expressed disappointment at Stoke City's under-par performance in the final.

Prime Minister of the United Kingdom, David Cameron awarded the medals to individual players at Wembley Stadium. Presenting the trophy was British Army Corporal Mark Ward, a lifelong Manchester City supporter who served in Afghanistan and whose bravery was rewarded with the Military Cross. Corporal Ward presented the trophy to the winning captain, Carlos Tevez, after the game.

Manchester City's victory set up a Community Shield match against rivals Manchester United – who City had beaten in the semi-finals – after United clinched the Premier League shortly before kick-off in the Final. The FA Cup winners are usually awarded qualification for the UEFA Europa League, but because Manchester City qualified for the UEFA Champions League via their league position, the Europa League place was passed to Stoke City as runners-up. In the 2011 FA Community Shield match in August, the FA Cup winners Manchester City lost 3–2 to Manchester United after creating a 2–0 lead at half time.

Manchester United winning the 2010–11 Premier League title earlier in the day meant double pride for Manchester as its teams claimed both of English football's blue ribbon competitions. The '35 years' banner that had stood at Old Trafford, home of Manchester United which referenced to Manchester City's long trophy drought, was taken down in recognition of City's victory.

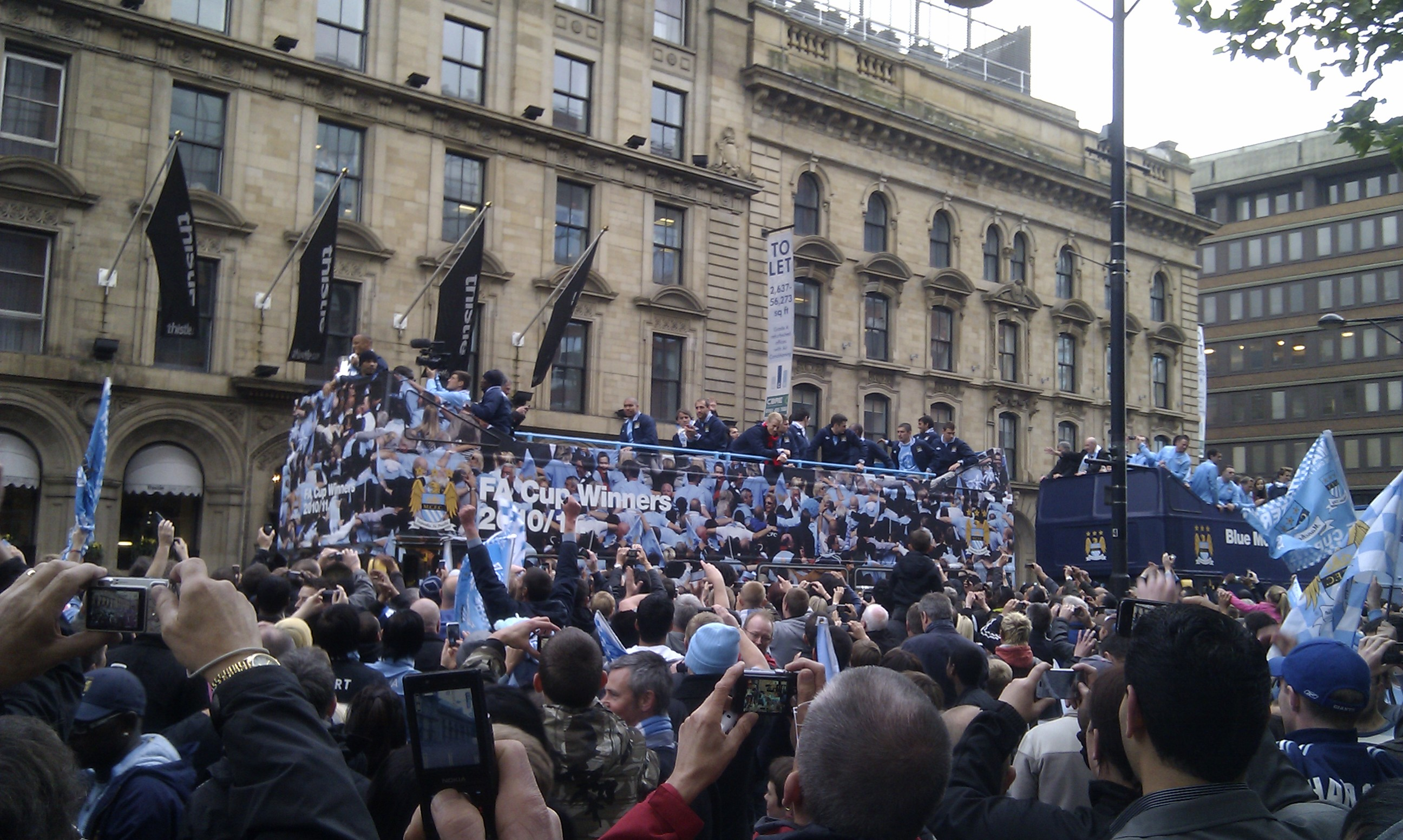
The victory parade reaches Portland Street.

The match was broadcast live in the United Kingdom by both ITV and ESPN, with ITV providing the free-to-air coverage and ESPN being the pay-TV alternative. Television viewing figures were collated after the final, with a peak of 8.5 million viewers recorded across both channels. ITV held the majority of the viewership, with a peak audience of 8.1 million during the last 30 minutes of the final and averaged at 6.68 million, their highest viewing figures for an FA Cup since the competition moved to ITV from the BBC in 2009. The pay-to-view alternative ESPN averaged 412,000 viewers throughout the day with a peak of 476,000.

Manchester City and Stoke City had been scheduled to play in a Premier League fixture on the day of the FA Cup Final, but instead the match had to be moved to the following Tuesday, making it the last mid-week game of the Premier League season, a match Manchester City won, 3–0. Despite it being Manchester City's final home game of the season, they postponed their homecoming celebrations until the post-season out of respect for the opposition.

Manchester City elected not to parade the trophy at the match as they did not wish to be seen as 'crass' in front of the visiting Stoke City supporters. Instead, Manchester City were invited by Manchester City Council to host an open-top bus parade through the City of Manchester in celebration of their victory. The parade took place on 23 May 2011 and began at 18:00 starting at Albert Square outside Manchester Town Hall where 10,000 people were present to see the team set off on the bus parade with various streets of the city centre closed by 12:00 in preparation for the parade. The open-top bus then travelled out of Manchester city centre via Princess Street, Portland Street, Piccadilly Gardens, Newton Street on onto Great Ancoats Street. The parade finally reached Ashton New Road where thousands supporters were waiting at the gates of the City of Manchester Stadium to welcome the team home. The parade culminated in a special reception at the stadium, where 40,000 who claimed free tickets for the event were waiting. Greater Manchester Police estimated that the parade attracted a crowd in excess of 100,000.

== See also ==
- 2011 Football League Cup final
- 2011 FA Trophy final
