= Bill Leivers =

English footballer and manager

Personal information
- Full name: William Ernest Leivers
- Date of birth: 29 January 1932 (age 94)
- Place of birth: Bolsover, Derbyshire, England
- Position: Right-back

Youth career
- Clay Lane Sports Club

Senior career*
| Years | Team | Apps | (Gls) |
| 1948–1953 | Chesterfield | 27 | (0) |
| 1953–1964 | Manchester City | 250 | (4) |
| 1964–1966 | Doncaster Rovers | 24 | (1) |
| Total | | 301 | (5) |

Managerial career
- 1964–1966: Doncaster Rovers
- 1966–1967: Workington
- 1967–1974: Cambridge United
- 1975: Chelmsford City
- 1979–1988: Cambridge City
- * Club domestic league appearances and goals

William Ernest Leivers (born 29 January 1932) is an English former professional footballer and football manager.

== Playing career ==
Leivers was born in Bolsover, Derbyshire. He attended school at Tupton Hall, alongside future Labour MP Dennis Skinner. He began his professional career in February 1950 with Chesterfield, whom he joined as an amateur from Clay Lane Sports Club in 1948.

Leivers moved to Manchester City in November 1953, for a fee of £10,500, making his debut against Preston North End in August 1954. The match saw the introduction of the tactical system which became known as the Revie Plan. However, Leivers sustained an injury, and Manchester City lost 5–0. It was to be another five months before he made another senior appearance, and he made only three over the whole season. Though he was known as a centre half when he arrived at Maine Road, it was at right-back that he established himself in the Manchester City team, during the 1955–56 season. That year Manchester City reached the FA Cup final, beating Birmingham City 3–1, giving Leivers the only major honour he was to achieve in his career. He gained a reputation as a committed defender; his desire to be part of the action resulted in several injuries. In ten years at Manchester City, he broke his nose five times and his elbow and ankle once. For a period in the latter part of his Manchester City career he was first team captain. He made 250 league appearances for City before moving to Doncaster Rovers on 10 July 1964, where he became player-manager.

With the death of Roy Little in January 2015, Leivers is the last living player from the Manchester City 1956 FA Cup winning squad. With the death of Johnny Newman in November 2025, Leivers is the last living player from the 1956 FA Cup Final.

== Coaching and managerial career ==
Leivers resigned as Doncaster manager in February 1966 with, Doncaster well placed for promotion from the Fourth Division. In November 1966, he took over as manager of Workington but left in December 1967 to manage Cambridge United in the Southern League. Leivers led Cambridge United to the Southern League title in 1969 and 1970 and to promotion to the Football League. He also guided the side to promotion to Division Three in 1973 but was unable to stop them being relegated the following season. He was sacked by Cambridge United in October 1974 after a disappointing start to the 1974–75 season.

Leivers subsequently managed Chelmsford City between February and December 1975, and in 1979 he returned to the Cambridge area to manage Cambridge City. In 1987, he became City's general manager, a position he held until retiring in 1999. He now lives in St Austell, Cornwall.

== Honours ==
=== As a player ===
Manchester City

- FA Cup: 1955–56

=== As a manager ===
Cambridge United

- Southern League: 1968–69, 1969–70
