= John McTavish (footballer, born 1932) =

Scottish footballer (1932–2025)

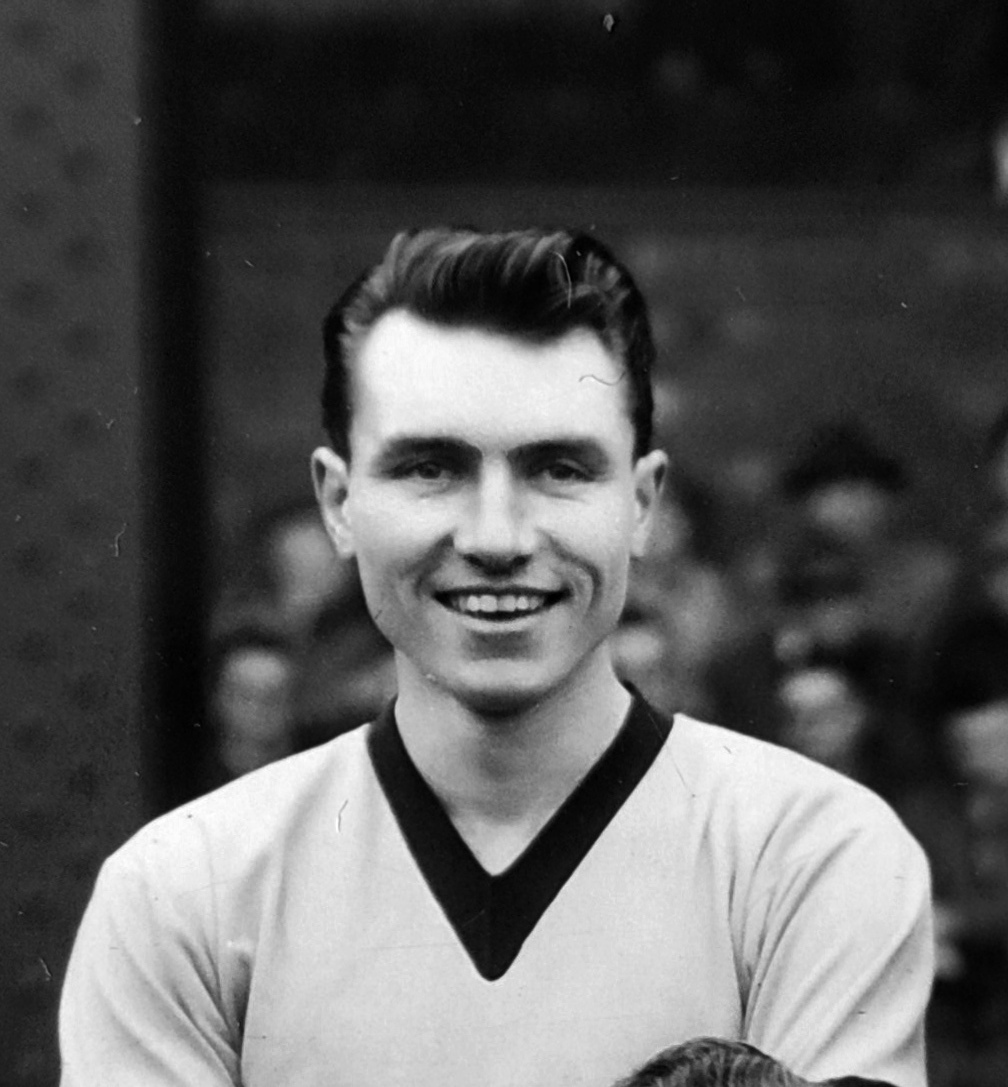

Personal information
- Full name: John Roberts McTavish
- Date of birth: 2 February 1932
- Place of birth: Glasgow, Scotland
- Date of death: 3 March 2025 (aged 93)
- Position: Centre-half

Youth career
- 1948–1952: Dalry Thistle

Senior career*
| Years | Team | Apps | (Gls) |
| 1952-1960 | Manchester City | 93 | (0) |
| 1960-1964 | St Mirren | 91 | (2) |
| 1964-1965 | Stranraer | 7 | (0) |
| Total | | 191 | (2) |
- * Club domestic league appearances and goals

John Roberts McTavish (2 February 1932 – 3 March 2025) was a Scottish footballer who played as a centre-half in the Football League for Manchester City. He enjoyed a 10-year career with City, making his debut on 21 November 1953 in a 1–0 away victory against Middlesbrough. For much of his City career, McTavish was a reliable reserve player. He regularly filled in for one of Ken Barnes, Dave Ewing, or Roy Paul, who were ever-present in City's half-back line for much of the decade. He returned to his native Scotland with St Mirren as part of the deal which took Gerry Baker to Maine Road in November 1960. He spent five years with St. Mirren, where he scored two goals, and made 91 league appearances. Following this, a year-long loan spell with Stranraer saw him make a further seven league appearances, before he retired from professional football in 1965.

His father Bob and uncle John were also footballers, both featuring for Falkirk and Tottenham Hotspur in the early 20th century.

John McTavish died on 3 March 2025, at the age of 93.
