= Jack Savage (English footballer) =

English footballer

Personal information
- Date of birth: 14 December 1929
- Place of birth: Bromley, England
- Date of death: January 2009 (aged 79)
- Place of death: Blackpool, England
- Position: Goalkeeper

Senior career*
Years	Team	Apps	(Gls)
1950–1951	Hull City	4	(0)
1951–1954	Halifax Town	57	(1)
1954–1957	Manchester City	30	(0)
1957–1959	Walsall	51	(0)
1959–1960	Wigan Athletic	4	(0)
Total		146	(1)
- * Club domestic league appearances and goals

Jack Savage (14 December 1929 - January 2009) was an English football goalkeeper who played for Hull City, Halifax Town, Manchester City, Walsall and Wigan Athletic.

Savage was signed by Manchester City in November 1953, where he deputised for Bert Trautmann. He was at the club for more than a year before making his debut, a 2–0 defeat to Newcastle United on 27 December 1954. He also played in the next game against Burnley, but once Trautmann recovered from injury Savage returned to the reserves. His next chance came in April 1956, when he again replaced Trautmann for two matches. Trautmann broke his neck in the 1956 FA Cup Final, giving Savage the opportunity of an extended run in the first team during the 1956–57 season.

He was transferred to Walsall in January 1958 for £4,000. In one of his early games for Walsall, an away match at Swindon, he was sent off. He made 51 appearances for Walsall, moving to non-league Wigan in 1959. He spent one season at the club, appearing four times for the club in the Lancashire Combination.
