= George Hannah (footballer, born 1928) =

English footballer (1928–1990)

Personal information
- Date of birth: 11 December 1928
- Place of birth: Liverpool, England
- Date of death: 5 May 1990 (aged 61)
- Position: Forward

Senior career*
Years	Team	Apps	(Gls)
- Linfield
1949–1957	Newcastle United	167	(41)
1957–1958	Lincoln City	38	(4)
1958–1964	Manchester City	114	(15)
1964–1965	Notts County	25	(1)
1965–1966	Bradford City	30	(2)
Total		374	(63)
- * Club domestic league appearances and goals

George L. Hannah (11 December 1928 – 5 May 1990) was an English footballer who played as a forward.

== Career ==
Hannah was born in Liverpool, England and signed for Newcastle United from Linfield in 1949 staying until 1957. He won an FA Cup winners medal in 1955, scoring the third goal in a 3–1 victory over Manchester City. He spent a season at Lincoln City before he moved to Manchester City in 1958 where he stayed until 1964, making 114 appearances and scoring 15 goals, before transferring to Notts County. His final season was with Bradford City before he retired in 1966. In his career, he played in 374 Football League games, scoring 63 goals, over the course of 17 seasons.

== Later life and death ==
After retirement from the game, Hannah, his wife June and their two children, Julie and Dale, moved back to Manchester. He bought a newsagent shop in Fallowfield in 1966 and ran it for 10 years until 1977, when he sold the shop and took a job working for British Telecom until his retirement in 1990. After a short illness, Hannah died in May of the same year.

== Honours ==
Newcastle United

- FA Cup: 1954–55
