= 2011 FA Community Shield =

- The match programme cover
Manchester City	Manchester United
2	3
- Date: 7 August 2011
- Venue: Wembley Stadium, London
- Man of the Match: Nani (Manchester United)
- Referee: Phil Dowd (Staffordshire)
- Attendance: 77,169
- Weather: Rain; 16 °C (61 °F)

The 2011 FA Community Shield (also known as The FA Community Shield sponsored by McDonald's for sponsorship reasons) was the 89th FA Community Shield, an annual football match contested by the winners of the previous season's Premier League and FA Cup competitions. The match was the 160th Manchester derby between Manchester United and Manchester City and played at Wembley Stadium, London, on 7 August 2011. Manchester United won the game 3–2, with goals from Chris Smalling and Nani (2), after Joleon Lescott and Edin Džeko had put City 2–0 up at half-time.

Manchester United qualified to take part for the fifth consecutive year by winning the 2010–11 Premier League title and Manchester City qualified by winning the 2010–11 FA Cup. United won the match for the fourth time in five years.

== Background ==
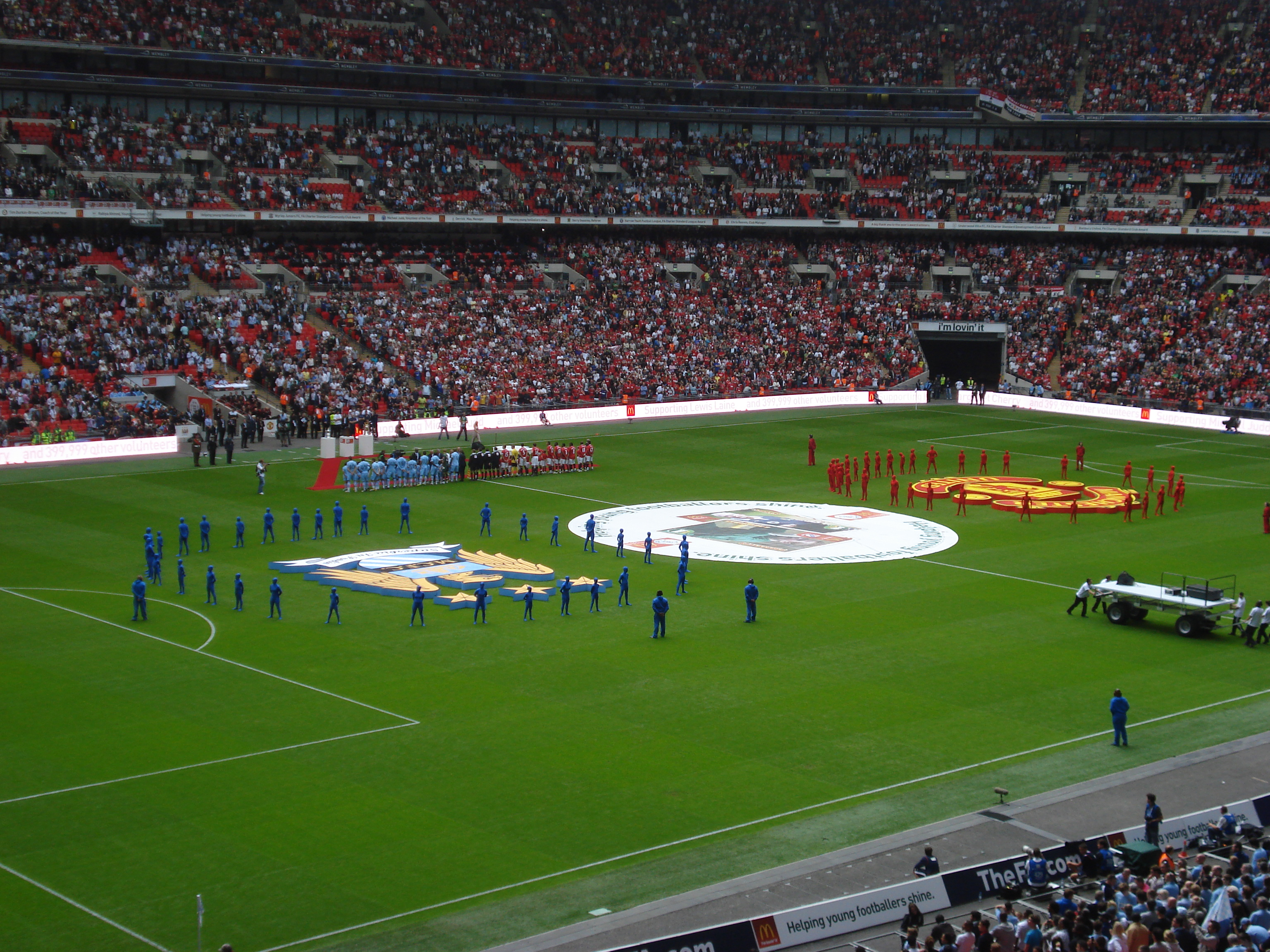
The two teams lining up for the national anthem

This was only the second occasion the two teams had met in the competition, with the first being the 1956 FA Charity Shield, which United won 1–0. Both teams secured their place in the 2011 Community Shield on the same day, 14 May 2011, when United clinched the 2010–11 Premier League title with a 1–1 draw against Blackburn Rovers at Ewood Park and City beating Stoke City 1–0 a few hours later in the 2011 FA Cup final.

== Match details ==
7 August 2011
14:30 BST

Manchester City	2–3	Manchester United
Lescott 38'; Džeko 45+1'	Report	Smalling 52'; Nani 58', 90+4'

Wembley Stadium, London
Attendance: 77,169
Referee: Phil Dowd (Staffordshire)

Manchester City	Manchester United

GK	25	(England) Joe Hart
RB	2	(England) Micah Richards	(yellow card) 22'
CB	4	(Belgium) Vincent Kompany (c)
CB	6	(England) Joleon Lescott
LB	13	(Serbia) Aleksandar Kolarov	(yellow card) 60'	(substituted off) 73'
CM	34	(Netherlands) Nigel de Jong
CM	7	(England) James Milner	(yellow card) 55'	(substituted off) 67'
AM	42	(Ivory Coast) Yaya Touré	(yellow card) 34'
RW	21	(Spain) David Silva
LW	45	(Italy) Mario Balotelli		(substituted off) 59'
CF	10	(Bosnia and Herzegovina) Edin Džeko	(yellow card) 19'
Substitutes:
GK	12	(England) Stuart Taylor
DF	15	(Montenegro) Stefan Savić
DF	22	(France) Gaël Clichy		(substituted on) 73'
MF	8	(England) Shaun Wright-Phillips
MF	11	(England) Adam Johnson		(substituted on) 67'
MF	18	(England) Gareth Barry		(substituted on) 59'
FW	16	(Argentina) Sergio Agüero
Manager:
(Italy) Roberto Mancini

GK	1	(Spain) David de Gea
RB	12	(England) Chris Smalling
CB	5	(England) Rio Ferdinand		(substituted off) 46'
CB	15	(Serbia) Nemanja Vidić (c)		(substituted off) 46'
LB	3	(France) Patrice Evra	(yellow card) 40'	(substituted off) 71'
RM	17	(Portugal) Nani
CM	16	(England) Michael Carrick		(substituted off) 46'
CM	8	(Brazil) Anderson	(yellow card) 19'
LM	18	(England) Ashley Young
CF	10	(England) Wayne Rooney
CF	19	(England) Danny Welbeck		(substituted off) 89'
Substitutes:
GK	34	(Denmark) Anders Lindegaard
DF	4	(England) Phil Jones		(substituted on) 46'
DF	21	(Brazil) Rafael		(substituted on) 71'
DF	23	(Northern Ireland) Jonny Evans		(substituted on) 46'
MF	13	(South Korea) Park Ji-sung
MF	35	(England) Tom Cleverley		(substituted on) 46'
FW	9	(Bulgaria) Dimitar Berbatov		(substituted on) 89'
Manager:
(Scotland) Sir Alex Ferguson

Man of the match

- Nani (Manchester United)

Match officials

- Assistant referees:
  - Simon Long (Cornwall)
  - Andrew Garratt (Staffordshire)
- Fourth official: Kevin Friend (Leicestershire)
- Reserve official: Scott Ledger (South Yorkshire)

Match rules

- 90 minutes
- Penalty shoot-out if scores level after 90 minutes
- Seven named substitutes
- Maximum of six substitutions

=== Statistics ===
	City	United
Total shots	8	21
Shots on target	6	12
Ball possession	44%	56%
Corner kicks	8	7
Fouls committed	14	11
Offsides	2	1
Yellow cards	5	2
Red cards	0	0

Source: BBC Sport

== See also ==
- 2010–11 Premier League
- 2010–11 FA Cup
- Manchester derby
- 1956 FA Charity Shield – the only previous occasion the Charity or Community Shield has been contested by the two Manchester clubs
