= Bobby Mitchell (footballer, born 1924) =

Scottish footballer

Personal information
- Full name: Robert Carmichael Mitchell
- Date of birth: 16 August 1924
- Place of birth: Glasgow, Scotland
- Date of death: 8 April 1993 (aged 68)
- Place of death: Newcastle upon Tyne, England
- Position: Outside left

Youth career
- Market Star

Senior career*
Years	Team	Apps	(Gls)
1942–1949	Third Lanark	70	(42)
1949–1961	Newcastle United	367	(95)
1961–1963	Berwick Rangers	51	(10)
1963–1966	Gateshead		
Total		488	(147)

International career
1947–1948	Scottish League XI	2	(1)
1951	Scotland	2	(1)

Managerial career
- 1963–1964: Gateshead
- * Club domestic league appearances and goals

Robert Carmichael Mitchell (16 August 1924 – 8 April 1993), nicknamed "Bobby Dazzler", was a Scottish footballer who played as an outside left.

Mitchell started his career with Third Lanark in 1942, spending seven years with the Hi-Hi before joining Newcastle United for £16,000 in February 1949. He played for the Magpies from 1949 to 1961, becoming something of a cult hero amongst supporters who nicknamed him "Bobby Dazzler". He was an instrumental part of the team that experienced much success in the 1950s, winning three FA Cups in a five-year period, which included scoring a goal in the 1955 FA Cup final. He made a total of 410 appearances for the club, scoring 113 goals.

After leaving Newcastle, Mitchell spent one season with Berwick Rangers, before returning to Tyneside as player-manager of Gateshead. He left this role in 1966 and became a publican in Newcastle.

Mitchell won two caps for the Scotland national team, and scored on his debut against Denmark in 1951. He also played twice for the Scottish League representative team.

== Honours ==
Newcastle United

- FA Cup: 1950–51, 1951–52, 1954–55
