= Johnny Williamson =

English footballer (1929–2021)

Personal information
- Date of birth: 8 May 1929
- Place of birth: Manchester, England
- Date of death: 27 August 2021 (aged 92)
- Position: Forward

Senior career*
Years	Team	Apps	(Gls)
1950–1955	Manchester City	59	(18)
1955–1958	Blackburn Rovers	9	(3)
Total		68	(21)
- * Club domestic league appearances and goals

Johnny Williamson (8 May 1929 – 27 August 2021) was a footballer who played as a forward for Manchester City and Blackburn Rovers in the 1950s.

Williamson made his Manchester City debut on 1 April 1950 in a 4–1 defeat against Arsenal. He spent the next few years on the fringes of the first team, playing more than half the first team games in only one season, 1953–54, when along with Billy Spurdle, he was Manchester City's joint top goalscorer with 12 goals.

In 1955, Williamson was playing in the reserves when a new tactic was tried out at the behest of Williamson and Ken Barnes. Inspired by the Hungarian team which had beaten England 6–3 at Wembley, Williamson was deployed as a deep-lying striker in an attempt to draw the opposing centre-half out of position. The tactic worked well, and for the start of the 1954–55 the first-team began to use the tactic, with Don Revie as the deep-lying forward. As a result, the tactic became known as the Revie Plan. On occasions when Revie was unavailable Williamson played the role, but made only nine appearances, and was transferred to Blackburn at the end of the season. He did not make much of an impact at Blackburn, making only nine appearances, in which he scored three goals.

In 1959, Williamson signed for Hyde United and played in the Cheshire County League. Earlier he had played for Ashton United in the Lancashire Combination.
