= Tommy Harmer =

English footballer

Personal information
- Full name: Thomas Harmer
- Date of birth: 2 February 1928
- Place of birth: Hackney, England
- Date of death: 25 December 2007 (aged 79)
- Position: Inside forward

Youth career
- 1948–1951: Tottenham Hotspur

Senior career*
Years	Team	Apps	(Gls)
1951–1960	Tottenham Hotspur	222	(51)
1960–1962	Watford	63	(6)
1962–1963	Chelsea	8	(1)
Total		293	(58)

Managerial career
- 1963–1967: Chelsea (youth team coach)
- * Club domestic league appearances and goals

Tommy Harmer (2 February 1928 – 25 December 2007) was an English footballer who played as a inside forward. He spent most of his career with Tottenham Hotspur before playing for Watford and Chelsea.

== Career ==
Nicknamed "Harmer the Charmer", Harmer signed as an amateur in August 1948 and made his debut against Bolton in September 1951. He made 222 appearances for Tottenham Hotspur scoring 51 goals including some sublime unstoppable penalties, tucked into the side netting behind an upright, before moving to Watford in October 1960.

Harmer signed for Chelsea in 1962 at the age of 34 and made his debut at home to Middlesbrough in October of that year. In total, he played nine games for Chelsea helping to win promotion to the top flight under manager Tommy Docherty. He scored just one goal, in a vital 1–0 away win against Sunderland in the penultimate game of the 1962–63 promotion season.

Harmer also played an important role in developing young players during the Docherty era, remaining as youth team coach until June 1967.

After his death, a minute's applause was held in his memory before Tottenham Hotspur's Boxing Day win over Fulham at White Hart Lane.
