= Dave Ewing =

Scottish footballer and manager (1929–1999)

Personal information
- Date of birth: 10 May 1929
- Place of birth: Logierait, Perthshire, Scotland
- Date of death: July 1999 (aged 70)
- Place of death: Manchester, England
- Position: Defender

Youth career
- Luncarty Juniors

Senior career*
Years	Team	Apps	(Gls)
1952–1962	Manchester City	279	(1)
1962–1964	Crewe Alexandra	48	(0)
1964–1965	Ashton United		
Total		327	(1)

Managerial career
- 1970–1971: Hibernian
- * Club domestic league appearances and goals

Dave Ewing (10 May 1929 – July 1999) was a Scottish footballer who played in the centre half position for Manchester City and Crewe Alexandra, and briefly managed Hibernian.

== Career ==
Ewing was born in Logierait, Perthshire in May 1929. He was spotted playing for Luncarty Juniors by Manchester City, and signed for the Mancunians on 10 June 1949. However, it was another four years before he made his first team debut, against Manchester United on 3 January 1953. Overall, he went on to make 279 appearances for City, scoring 1 goal.

Ewing played in the 1955 FA Cup Final and 1956 FA Cup Final. Newcastle United beat City 3–1 in 1955, but the following year Ewing was on the winning side against Birmingham City. City were 3–1 winners in a game made famous by the heroics of Bert Trautmann who played on with a broken neck to help City lift the trophy. Last-ditch clearances were an important part of his game, but on occasion worked to his detriment; his tally of 10 own goals is a Manchester City record.

His playing days at City ended when he joined Crewe Alexandra at the end of the 1961–62 season and he played two seasons for the Cheshire side, adding another 48 appearances to his career total before leaving for Ashton United in the summer of 1964. He played one season with Ashton in the Midlands League before retiring from playing altogether.

Ewing took up a coaching role back at Manchester City before moving on in 1970, subsequently coaching at Sheffield Wednesday, Bradford City and Crystal Palace, as well as becoming manager at Scottish side Hibernian during the 1970–71 season.

Dave was signed up as Hibs' coach in September 1970 and when Willie MacFarlane resigned in early December the same year, he took over the next day. He didn't win any of his first eight matches but got the supporters on his side by re-signing Joe Baker in January 1971.

League form continued badly but Hibs reached the Scottish Cup semi-final drawing 0-0 with Rangers. For the replay he employed the motivational tactic of declaring "Rangers are rubbish", however, the opposition ran out 2-1 winners. Hibs finished 12th in the League after winning 4, drawing 6 and losing 9 under his rein. He left after a friendly match against Real Mallorca on 20 May 1971 which Hibs lost 2-1.

But it was at City, to where Ewing returned in 1973, that he had the most effect in his role of coach as he led the club's reserve team to their first ever Central League title and oversaw the promotion of several talented youngsters into the City first team. When John Bond took over Manchester City in October 1980, with his assistant John Benson and coach John Sainty Dave was sacked along with youth team and goalkeeping coach Steve Fleet, who was responsible for developing city goalkeeping legend Alex Williams.

An uncompromising player with a huge frame and vocal encouragement to match, Ewing died at the age of 70 in 1999.

In the 1960s, he owned a small hardware shop in Reddish, Stockport.

== Honours ==
Manchester City

- FA Cup: 1955–56; runner-up: 1954–55
