= Jack Dyson =

English cricketer and footballer

Cricket information
- Batting: Right-handed
- Bowling: Right-arm offbreak

Career statistics
Competition	First-class	List A
Matches	150	2
Runs scored	4,433	66
Batting average	21.41	66.00
100s/50s	1/23	0/1
Top score	118*	60*
Balls bowled	11,288	79
Wickets	161	5
Bowling average	27.62	9.40
5 wickets in innings	8	1
10 wickets in match	1	0
Best bowling	7/83	5/47
Catches/stumpings	55/–	0/–
- Source: CricketArchive, 12 January 2023

Jack Dyson (8 July 1934 – 22 November 2000) was both an English first-class cricketer and a professional footballer. He was born and died in Oldham, Lancashire.

He started his sporting career as a footballer and spent four seasons with Manchester City during which time he played 62 matches and scored 26 goals. One of those goals came in their 1956 FA Cup Final victory over Birmingham.

After leaving football he concentrated on his cricketing career, which had already begun while he was with Manchester City. A right-handed batsman and handy offspinner, he made his first-class debut in 1954, playing with Lancashire. He earned his Lancashire Cap two years later in 1956, the same year that he had won his FA Cup winner's medal. In that season he scored what would be his only first-class hundred, 118 not out against Scotland. He also played in an unusual victory over Leicestershire as it was achieved without losing a wicket, with two opening partnerships of 166 and 66 between Dyson and Alan Wharton enough to give a victory by 10 wickets.

Dyson was a controversial figure throughout his career, he was a free spirit and it ended up costing him his job at Lancashire. In 1960 the Lancashire committee charged him with "a serious breach of discipline and an act of insubordination and insolence to the captain".

For the next two years Dyson played with Staffordshire and in league cricket. In September 1962 the Lancashire committee was overthrown and Dyson returned to the county for two more seasons, but was released again at the end of the 1964 season.

== Honours ==
Manchester City

- FA Cup: 1955–56
