= Bobby Johnstone =

Scottish footballer (1929–2001)

Personal information
- Full name: Robert Johnstone
- Date of birth: 7 September 1929
- Place of birth: Selkirk, Scotland
- Date of death: 22 August 2001 (aged 71)
- Place of death: Selkirk, Scotland
- Position: Inside forward

Youth career
- 1945–1946: Newtongrange Star

Senior career*
Years	Team	Apps	(Gls)
1946	Selkirk		
1946–1955	Hibernian	168	(88)
1955–1959	Manchester City	124	(42)
1959–1961	Hibernian	31	(17)
1961–1965	Oldham Athletic	143	(36)
1965	Witton Albion	0	(0)
Total		466	(183)

International career
1951–1956	Scotland	17	(10)
1951–1954	Scottish Football League XI	6	(1)
1955	Scotland A vs B trial	1	(0)
- * Club domestic league appearances and goals

Robert Johnstone (7 September 1929 – 22 August 2001) was a Scottish footballer who played for Selkirk, Hibernian, Manchester City, Oldham Athletic and Witton Albion. Johnstone also represented Scotland and the Scottish League.

Johnstone is most remembered as one of the Famous Five forward line (Smith, Johnstone, Reilly, Turnbull and Ormond) for Hibernian in the late 1940s and early 1950s. He joined Manchester City in 1955, becoming the first player to score in successive FA Cup Finals at Wembley, in 1955 and 1956. After a short return to Hibs he also played for Oldham Athletic.

He won 17 caps for Scotland.

== Early life ==
Born on 7 September 1929 at 11 Cannon Street, Selkirk, to Elizabeth and George 'Hopey' Johnstone. Bobby was born into a footballing family in a rugby playing town. His father Hopey was described as a "hard as teak" centre-half and once declined a trial for Glasgow Rangers, preferring instead to sign for professional Border side, Peebles Rovers. Hopey who stood over six foot tall, won Border Cup medals for Selkirk in 1931 and 1932. Bobby's great uncle 'Geordie 'was in the team that won Selkirk's first ever trophy, the 1895 Border Cup. At the age of four Johnstone contracted diphtheria which required a tracheotomy in order to stabilise his condition and was confined to his bed for around two months.

Johnstone went to school at Philiphaugh until the age of 11, then Knowepark in Selkirk where he won a prize in English. The Johnstone family moved to the nearby newly built no. 2 Linglie Road in 1943 and shortly after at the age of 14, Bobby became an apprentice painter with local firm Nichol's. It was around this time that he started to draw attention playing in the then popular five-a-side tournaments against players almost twice his age.

== Club career ==
=== Selkirk ===
With Selkirk's pre-World War II side depleted due to retirement and those like Sandy Adamson who were killed in the war, the club turned to the town's youth to restart football in peace time. Making a name for himself with local Parkvale Rovers and Army Cadet football was a young Bobby Johnstone. In October 1946, in front of a 1,500 crowd, a Selkirk team including Johnstone defeated Queen of the South which featured future Scottish Internationalist Billy Houliston on the Toll Field. Johnstone also featured in the side which lost out to professional Gala Fairydean in the East of Scotland Cup Final. Later in 1946, both Bobby Johnstone and Eck Piercy were signed for Hibernian, with the promise of a friendly game at Ettrick Park being the transfer fee. The deal was honoured in October 1947 in front of 2,000 spectators with Johnstone being given permission to play for Selkirk one last time.

=== Hibernian ===
Johnstone, known to his mates as 'Nicker', signed for Hibs in 1946 from Selkirk and had two spells with them. Having signed for Hibs, Johnstone received rave reviews while playing for the reserves and was given his first chance in the first team in April 1949, when they played a friendly against Nithsdale Wanderers at Sanquhar. Hibs' Famous Five forward line were given their collective debut in that game.

However, at the start of the 1949–50 season in August it was Bobby Combe in possession of the jersey. His big chance came in October after Hibs half backs got the blame for losing to Dunfermline in the League Cup semi final at Tynecastle. The entire half back line were dropped and Johnstone was given his chance with Combe moved to half back. Therefore, the Famous Five made their collective competitive debut on 15 October 1949 against Queen of the South, with Hibs winning 2–0.

Johnstone picked up Scottish League winners medals in 1951 and 1952. He also played in a Scottish League Cup final and ended league runners-up in the seasons bookending the double league win.

Johnstone was the first of Hibs' famous five to leave Hibs when he transferred in March 1955.

=== Manchester City ===
Johnstone joined Manchester City for the hefty sum of £22,000. Johnstone was the only one of the Famous Five to play in England. He scored in back-to-back FA Cup Finals for Manchester City, losing in 1955 to Newcastle United and winning in 1956 against Birmingham City. Johnstone was the first player to score in consecutive FA Cup Finals at Wembley. He played alongside future Hibs manager Dave Ewing in both finals.

=== Return to Hibernian ===
Johnstone returned to Hibs in 1959 for £6,000. Johnstone is remembered most for his first spell with Hibs, yet he inspired them to a couple of incredible wins on his return, even though he had put on a few pounds and was a little less mobile. However, the brain had not slowed down any and his prompting enabled the team to score 10 goals at Firhill against Partick Thistle and another 11 at Broomfield against Airdrie.

=== Oldham Athletic ===
After his second spell with Hibernian, Johnstone returned to England joining Oldham Athletic in 1961. He spent four years at Oldham making 143 appearances and scored 36 goals helping them gain promotion to the Third Division in 1963. Johnson is regarded as one of the most important players for Oldham during the 1960's.

Bernard Halford was assistant secretary in the early 1960s and recalled, "He transformed the club, no doubt about that. He had the crowds flocking down Sheepfoot Lane, even though Athletic had dropped into the Fourth Division. I think it was the only period in my life when I regularly told lies. On match days the phone never stopped ringing. 'Is Johnstone playing?' Bobby might have been sitting in my office with his ankle in plaster, but I had to say he was playing, otherwise the fans wouldn't have turned up. It really was as cut and dried as that."

In the summer of 1965, some 19 years after his senior career had started, Johnstone retired from playing professional football.

== International career ==
Of Johnstone's seventeen international caps, probably the most memorable was scoring on his debut, a 3–2 win against England at Wembley in which Lawrie Reilly also scored. From Scotland's 22-man 1954 World Cup squad, Scotland decided to take only 13 of the 22 to the finals. Johnstone was in the 13 but withdrew through injury. Staying at home on reserve were the likes of Bobby Combe and Jimmy Binning. George Hamilton was also on reserve but travelled after Johnstone's withdrawal.

Johnstone also collected international goals against Northern Ireland, Wales, Sweden and Finland. As well as winning 17 international caps for Scotland, Johnstone also represented the Scottish League on 6 occasions. He also played for a Great Britain team against a "Rest of Europe" side in August 1955, a match played to commemorate the 75th year of the Irish Football Association.

== Personal life ==
He was survived by his daughter Nicola and granddaughter Caroline.

== Career statistics ==
Appearances and goals by national team and year
National team	Year	Apps	Goals
Scotland	1951	4	3
Scotland	1952	1	0
Scotland	1953	3	2
Scotland	1954	5	3
Scotland	1955	3	2
Scotland	1956	1	0
Total		17	10

Scores and results list Scotland's goal tally first.

#	Date	Venue	Opponent	Score	Result	Competition
1	14 April 1951	Wembley Stadium, London	England	1–1	3–2	Home International
2	6 October 1951	Windsor Park, Belfast	Northern Ireland	2–0	3–0	Home International
3	6 October 1951	Windsor Park, Belfast	Northern Ireland	3–0	3–0	Home International
4	6 May 1953	Hampden Park, Glasgow	Sweden	1–1	1–2	Friendly
5	4 November 1953	Hampden Park, Glasgow	Wales	2–0	3–3	Home International and 1954 World Cup Qualifier
6	25 May 1954	Olympiastadion, Helsinki	Finland	2–0	2–1	Friendly
7	3 November 1954	Hampden Park, Glasgow	Northern Ireland	2–2	2–2	Home International
8	8 December 1954	Hampden Park, Glasgow	Hungary	2–3	2–4	Friendly
9	9 November 1955	Hampden Park, Glasgow	Wales	1–0	2–0	Home International
10	9 November 1955	Hampden Park, Glasgow	Wales	2–0	2–0	Home International

== Honours ==
Hibernian

- Scottish League First Division: 1950–51, 1951–52
- Scottish League Cup runner-up: 1950–51

Manchester City

- FA Cup: 1955–56; runner-up: 1954–55

Individual

- Scottish Football Hall of Fame inductee (2010)
