= 1955 FA Cup final =

- Event: 1954–55 FA Cup
Newcastle United	Manchester City
3	1
- Date: 7 May 1955
- Venue: Wembley Stadium, London
- Referee: Reg Leafe (Mapperley)
- Attendance: 100,000

The 1955 FA Cup final was the 74th final of the FA Cup. It took place on 7 May 1955 at Wembley Stadium and was contested between Newcastle United and Manchester City.

Newcastle won the match 3–1, thus winning the FA Cup for the third time in five years and the sixth time in all. Jackie Milburn scored Newcastle's first goal after 45 seconds (a record for a Wembley final that would stand until 1997), before Bobby Johnstone equalised for City just before half-time. Bobby Mitchell restored Newcastle's lead in the 52nd minute, and George Hannah extended it seven minutes later.

The match was virtually decided in the 17th minute when City fullback Jimmy Meadows attempted a tackle on Mitchell, only to sustain a serious leg injury which forced him to be stretchered off five minutes later (and also forced him to retire from playing). As substitutes were not allowed in English football at the time, City had to play the rest of the match with ten players.

As of 2025, this remains Newcastle's last FA Cup win and was their last major domestic honour until the 2025 EFL Cup. Since 1955, Newcastle have appeared in three FA Cup finals (1974, 1998 and 1999) and two FA Cup semi finals (2000 and 2005).

== Match details ==
7 May 1955
15:00 BST

Newcastle United	3–1	Manchester City
Milburn 1'; Mitchell 52'; Hannah 59'	Report	Johnstone 45'

Wembley, London
Attendance: 100,000
Referee: Reg Leafe

Newcastle United	Manchester City

1	(Scotland) Ronnie Simpson
2	(England) Bobby Cowell
3	(England) Ron Batty
4	(Scotland) Jimmy Scoular (c)
5	(England) Bob Stokoe
6	(Northern Ireland) Tommy Casey
7	(England) Len White
8	(England) Jackie Milburn
9	(England) Vic Keeble
10	(England) George Hannah
11	(Scotland) Bobby Mitchell
Manager:
(Scotland) Doug Livingstone

1	(West Germany) Bert Trautmann
2	(England) Jimmy Meadows
3	(England) Roy Little
4	(England) Ken Barnes
5	(Scotland) Dave Ewing
6	(Wales) Roy Paul (c)
7	(Guernsey) Billy Spurdle
8	(England) Joe Hayes
9	(England) Don Revie
10	(Scotland) Bobby Johnstone
11	(Republic of Ireland) Paddy Fagan
Manager:
(Scotland) Les McDowall
