= Roy Little =

English footballer

Personal information
- Date of birth: 1 June 1931
- Place of birth: Manchester, Lancashire, England
- Date of death: 29 January 2015 (aged 83)
- Place of death: Manchester, England
- Position: Defender

Youth career
- Greenwood Victoria

Senior career*
Years	Team	Apps	(Gls)
1949–1958	Manchester City	168	(2)
1958–1961	Brighton & Hove Albion	83	(0)
1961–1964	Crystal Palace	38	(1)
1964–1966	Dover	68	(0)
1966	Christchurch City		
Total		357	(3)

Managerial career
- 1964–1966: Dover
- * Club domestic league appearances and goals

Roy Little (1 June 1931 – 29 January 2015) was an English football right back who was born in Manchester. He left school, at age 14. His first professional club was Manchester City, who he joined from the amateur side Greenwood Victoria in August 1949. He did not make his league debut until more than three years later, playing against Liverpool at Anfield in January 1953. He made five further appearances that season, but the following season he displaced Jack Hannaway to become first choice full-back. Under the Revie Plan, Little formed a defensive partnership with Jimmy Meadows, as Manchester City reached consecutive FA Cup finals.

In the 1955 FA Cup final, against Newcastle United, Little's despairing lunge was unable to prevent Jackie Milburn from scoring the opening goal after less than a minute. Midway through the first half Little's defensive partner Meadows was lost to injury, and though Manchester City equalised, the final score was a comfortable 3–1 win for Newcastle. Though defeated in the 1955 final, Manchester City had another strong season in 1955–56. Little was ever-present as City finished fourth in the league and again reached the FA Cup final, in which they faced Birmingham City. This time Manchester City scored an early goal, and by the middle of the second half gained a 3–1 lead. A serious injury to Manchester City goalkeeper Bert Trautmann meant City captain Roy Paul considered putting Little in goal. However, Trautmann insisted upon carrying on, and City held out for the victory, giving Little the first and only major honour of his career. Three days later X-rays found that Trautmann had broken his neck.

Little remained a first team regular for two further seasons, but lost his place to Cliff Sear in 1958, and was transferred to Brighton & Hove Albion for £4,850 on 18 October, having played a total of 187 matches for City, scoring two goals. He later played for Crystal Palace, who had just gained promotion to the Third Division. He was one of four players to make their Palace debut on the opening day of the 1961–62 season. After 38 appearances for the Glaziers, Little ended his football career with a spell as player-manager of Dover.

After retiring from professional football Little returned to Manchester, and took a job at a University of Manchester sports centre in Wythenshawe, where he worked for over 25 years until retirement. A university football competition is named in his honour. The current holders are Physics FC.

Little died on 29 January 2015 in Manchester. He was 83. His obituary was placed in the Manchester Evening News on 2 February 2015.

== Honours ==
Manchester City

- FA Cup: 1955–56; runner-up: 1954–55
