= Revie Plan =

Tactical system in association football

The Revie Plan was a tactical system in association football used by Manchester City in the 1950s. The system was named after Manchester City player Don Revie, who had the most important role in it.

In 1953, English football was astounded by the Hungarian team which beat England 6–3 at Wembley Stadium. The Revie plan was a variation on the tactics used by the Hungarians, involving Don Revie playing as a deep-lying centre-forward, in a similar manner to Hungarian striker Nándor Hidegkuti. Revie started attacks by coming into the centre of the field to receive the ball, drawing the opposing centre-half out of position. The role can be retroactively compared to the modern false 9 role.

The system was first implemented by the Manchester City reserve team, at the behest of Johnny Williamson and Ken Barnes. Using the system, with Williamson playing the main deep-lying centre-forward, the reserve team went unbeaten for the last 26 games of the 1953–54 season. Before the start of the 1954–55 season, Manchester City manager Les McDowall called his team into pre-season training two weeks early to try the new tactic. Manchester City lost their first game using the system 5–0, but as the players became more used to the system it started to become more successful. Using the system Manchester City reached the 1955 FA Cup Final, but lost to Newcastle United 3–1. The following year City again reached the final where they played Birmingham City, this time winning 3–1.
