= 1955–56 FA Cup =

Tournament details
- Country: England; Wales

Final positions
- Champions: Manchester City (3rd title)
- Runners-up: Birmingham City

The 1955–56 FA Cup was the 75th staging of the world's oldest football cup competition, the FA Cup. Manchester City won the competition, beating Birmingham City 3–1 in the final at Wembley, London.

Matches were scheduled to be played at the stadium of the team named first on the date specified for each round, which was always a Saturday. If scores were level after 90 minutes had been played, a replay would take place at the stadium of the second-named team later the same week. If the replayed match was drawn further replays would be held at neutral venues until a winner was determined. If scores were level after 90 minutes had been played in a replay, a 30-minute period of extra time would be played.

== Calendar ==
Round	Date
Preliminary round	10 September 1955
First qualifying round	24 September 1955
Second qualifying round	8 October 1955
Third qualifying round	22 October 1955
Fourth qualifying round	5 November 1955
First round proper	19 November 1955
Second round	10 December 1955
Third round	7 January 1956
Fourth round	28 January 1956
Fifth round	18 February 1956
Sixth round	3 March 1956
Semifinals	17 March 1956
Final	5 May 1956

== Qualifying rounds ==
Most participating clubs that were not members of the Football League competed in the qualifying rounds to secure one of 30 places available in the first round.

The winners from the fourth qualifying round were Shildon, Easington Colliery Welfare, Durham City, Scarborough, Crook Town, Ashton United, Netherfield, Rhyl, Burton Albion, Halesowen Town, Northwich Victoria, Goole Town, Worksop Town, Boston United, Hereford United, Peterborough United, Skegness Town, Bedford Town, March Town United, Southall, Ramsgate Athletic, Margate, Hastings United, Leyton, Wycombe Wanderers, Dorchester Town, Salisbury, Weymouth, Lovell's Athletic and Yeovil Town.

Those appearing in the competition proper for the first time were Easington Colliery Welfare, Halesowen Town, Skegness Town, March Town United, Ramsgate Athletic, Salisbury and Burton Albion. Albion was the fifth club from Burton upon Trent to qualify for the main draw of the FA Cup, following Swifts, Wanderers, United and Town respectively.

Of the others, Shildon and Southall had last featured at this stage in 1936-37, Margate in 1935-36, Wycombe Wanderers in 1932-33, Durham City in 1927-28, Worksop Town in 1926-27 and Northwich Victoria in 1892-93.

== Results ==
=== First round proper ===
At this stage the 48 Third Division North and South clubs joined the 30 non-league clubs who came through the qualifying rounds along with Bishop Auckland and Hendon, who were given byes to this round as the champions and runners-up from the previous season's FA Amateur Cup.

The matches were played on Saturday, 19 November 1955. Seven matches were drawn, with replays taking place later that week. Two ties needed a second replay, which took place on the following Monday, 28 November 1955.

Tie no	Home team	Score	Away team	Date	Attendance	Summary
1	Chesterfield	1–0	Chester	19 November 1955		
2	Darlington	0–0	Carlisle United	19 November 1955		
Replay	Carlisle United	0–0	Darlington	22 November 1955		
2nd replay	Darlington	3–1	Carlisle United	28 November 1955		
3	Hastings United	6–1	Southall	19 November 1955		
4	Barrow	0–0	Crewe Alexandra	19 November 1955		
Replay	Crewe Alexandra	2–3	Barrow	23 November 1955		
5	Rochdale	0–1	York City	19 November 1955		
6	Watford	5–3	Ramsgate Athletic	19 November 1955		
7	Weymouth	3–2	Salisbury	19 November 1955		
8	Yeovil Town	1–1	Aldershot	19 November 1955		
Replay	Aldershot	1–1	Yeovil Town	23 November 1955		
2nd replay	Yeovil Town	0–3	Aldershot	28 November 1955		
9	Reading	1–0	Bournemouth & Boscombe Athletic	19 November 1955		
10	Gillingham	1–1	Shrewsbury Town	19 November 1955		
Replay	Shrewsbury Town	4–1	Gillingham	24 November 1955		
11	Swindon Town	4–0	Hereford United	19 November 1955		
12	Bishop Auckland	3–1	Durham City	19 November 1955		
13	Wycombe Wanderers	1–3	Burton Albion	19 November 1955		
14	Accrington Stanley	3–1	Wrexham	19 November 1955		
15	Brentford	4–0	March Town United	19 November 1955		
16	Crook Town	2–2	Derby County	19 November 1955		
Replay	Derby County	5–1	Crook Town	23 November 1955		
17	Northampton Town	4–1	Millwall	19 November 1955		
18	Coventry City	0–1	Exeter City	19 November 1955		
19	Brighton & Hove Albion	8–1	Newport County	19 November 1955		
20	Rhyl	0–3	Bradford Park Avenue	19 November 1955		
21	Norwich City	4–0	Dorchester Town	19 November 1955		
22	Bradford City	3–1	Oldham Athletic	19 November 1955		
23	Crystal Palace	0–0	Southampton	19 November 1955		
Replay	Southampton	2–0	Crystal Palace	23 November 1955		
24	Goole Town	1–2	Halifax Town	19 November 1955		
25	Southend United	2–0	Queens Park Rangers	19 November 1955		
26	Hartlepools United	3–0	Gateshead	19 November 1955		
27	Scunthorpe & Lindsey United	3–0	Shildon	19 November 1955		
28	Bedford Town	3–0	Leyton	19 November 1955		
29	Mansfield Town	2–0	Stockport County	19 November 1955		
30	Margate	2–2	Walsall	19 November 1955		
Replay	Walsall	6–1	Margate	24 November 1955		
31	Halesowen Town	2–4	Hendon	19 November 1955		
32	Southport	6–1	Ashton United	19 November 1955		
33	Torquay United	2–0	Colchester United	19 November 1955		
34	Workington	4–2	Scarborough	19 November 1955		
35	Netherfield	1–5	Grimsby Town	19 November 1955		
36	Easington Colliery Welfare	0–2	Tranmere Rovers	19 November 1955		
37	Boston United	3–2	Northwich Victoria	19 November 1955		
38	Peterborough United	3–1	Ipswich Town	19 November 1955	20,843	
39	Leyton Orient	7–1	Lovells Athletic	19 November 1955		
40	Skegness Town	0–4	Worksop Town	19 November 1955		

=== Second round proper ===
The matches were played on Saturday, 10 December 1955. Seven matches were drawn, with replays taking place later that week.

Tie no	Home team	Score	Away team	Date	Attendance	Summary
1	Chesterfield	1–2	Hartlepools United	10 December 1955		
2	Darlington	0–1	Accrington Stanley	10 December 1955		
3	Weymouth	0–1	Southend United	10 December 1955		
4	Reading	2–2	Aldershot	10 December 1955		
Replay	Aldershot	3–0	Reading	14 December 1955		
5	Walsall	2–1	Southampton	10 December 1955		
6	Derby County	1–6	Boston United	10 December 1955	23,757	
7	Swindon Town	1–1	Peterborough United	10 December 1955		
Replay	Peterborough United	1–2	Swindon Town	15 December 1955		
8	Shrewsbury Town	0–0	Torquay United	10 December 1955		
Replay	Torquay United	5–1	Shrewsbury Town	14 December 1955		
9	Bishop Auckland	0–0	Scunthorpe & Lindsey United	10 December 1955		
Replay	Scunthorpe & Lindsey United	2–0	Bishop Auckland	15 December 1955		
10	Tranmere Rovers	0–3	Barrow	10 December 1955		
11	Northampton Town	4–1	Hastings United	10 December 1955		
12	Brighton & Hove Albion	1–2	Norwich City	10 December 1955		
13	Bradford City	2–2	Worksop Town	10 December 1955		
Replay	Worksop Town	1–0	Bradford City	15 December 1955		
14	Bradford Park Avenue	4–3	Workington	10 December 1955		
15	Exeter City	6–2	Hendon	10 December 1955		
16	Bedford Town	3–2	Watford	10 December 1955		
17	Halifax Town	0–0	Burton Albion	10 December 1955		
Replay	Burton Albion	1–0	Halifax Town	14 December 1955		
18	Southport	0–0	Grimsby Town	10 December 1955		
Replay	Grimsby Town	3–2	Southport	14 December 1955		
19	York City	2–1	Mansfield Town	10 December 1955		
20	Leyton Orient	4–1	Brentford	10 December 1955		

=== Third round proper ===
At this stage the 44 Second Division and First Division (top-flight) teams entered the competition.

The matches were scheduled to be played on Saturday, 7 January 1956, though four were postponed until later that week because of bad weather. Four matches were drawn, with replays taking place later that week. Boston United, Worksop Town, Bedford Town and Burton Albion were the last non-league sides left in the competition.

Tie no	Home team	Score	Away team	Date	Attendance	Summary
1	Bury	0–1	Burnley	10 January 1956		
2	Liverpool	2–0	Accrington Stanley	7 January 1956	48,385	
3	Walsall	0–1	Port Vale	7 January 1956	21,836	
4	Notts County	0–1	Fulham	7 January 1956		
5	Aston Villa	1–1	Hull City	7 January 1956	33,284	
Replay	Hull City	1–2	Aston Villa	12 January 1956	24,253	
6	Sheffield Wednesday	1–3	Newcastle United	7 January 1956	48,198	
7	Bolton Wanderers	3–0	Huddersfield Town	11 January 1956	20,862	
8	Wolverhampton Wanderers	1–2	West Bromwich Albion	7 January 1956	55,564	
9	Sunderland	4–2	Norwich City	7 January 1956	46,390	
10	Lincoln City	2–3	Southend United	7 January 1956		
11	Luton Town	0–4	Leicester City	11 January 1956		
12	Everton	3–1	Bristol City	7 January 1956		
13	Swindon Town	1–0	Worksop Town	7 January 1956		
14	Doncaster Rovers	3–0	Nottingham Forest	7 January 1956		
15	Sheffield United	5–0	Barrow	7 January 1956		
16	Tottenham Hotspur	4–0	Boston United	7 January 1956		
17	Manchester City	2–1	Blackpool	11 January 1956		
18	Bristol Rovers	4–0	Manchester United	7 January 1956	35,872	
19	Northampton Town	1–2	Blackburn Rovers	7 January 1956		
20	Portsmouth	3–1	Grimsby Town	7 January 1956		
21	West Ham United	5–2	Preston North End	7 January 1956		
22	Bradford Park Avenue	0–4	Middlesbrough	7 January 1956		
23	Exeter City	0–0	Stoke City	7 January 1956		
Replay	Stoke City	3–0	Exeter City	9 January 1956		
24	Hartlepools United	0–1	Chelsea	7 January 1956		
25	Swansea Town	1–2	York City	7 January 1956		
26	Charlton Athletic	7–0	Burton Albion	7 January 1956		
27	Arsenal	2–2	Bedford Town	7 January 1956		
Replay	Bedford Town	1–2	Arsenal	12 January 1956		
28	Leeds United	1–2	Cardiff City	7 January 1956		
29	Torquay United	1–7	Birmingham City	7 January 1956	18,730	
30	Rotherham United	1–1	Scunthorpe & Lindsey United	7 January 1956		
Replay	Scunthorpe & Lindsey United	4–2	Rotherham United	12 January 1956		
31	Aldershot	1–2	Barnsley	7 January 1956		
32	Leyton Orient	1–0	Plymouth Argyle	7 January 1956		

=== Fourth round proper ===
The matches were played on Saturday, 28 January 1956. Four matches were drawn, three of which were settled in a single replay. The fourth, between Burnley and Chelsea, was eventually decided in Chelsea's favour in the fourth replay, played 18 days after the date of the original tie.

Tie no	Home team	Score	Away team	Date	Attendance	Summary
1	Burnley	1–1	Chelsea	28 January 1956		
Replay	Chelsea	1–1	Burnley	1 February 1956		
2nd replay	Burnley	2–2	Chelsea	6 February 1956		
3rd replay	Chelsea	0–0	Burnley	13 February 1956		
4th replay	Burnley	0–2	Chelsea	15 February 1956		
2	Liverpool	3–3	Scunthorpe & Lindsey United	28 January 1956	53,393	
Replay	Scunthorpe & Lindsey United	0–2	Liverpool	6 February 1956	19,500	
3	Leicester City	3–3	Stoke City	28 January 1956	35,877	
Replay	Stoke City	2–1	Leicester City	30 January 1956	34,120	
4	Bolton Wanderers	1–2	Sheffield United	28 January 1956	47,105	
5	West Bromwich Albion	2–0	Portsmouth	28 January 1956	59,448	
6	Tottenham Hotspur	3–1	Middlesbrough	28 January 1956	41,895	
7	Fulham	4–5	Newcastle United	28 January 1956	39,200	
8	Barnsley	0–1	Blackburn Rovers	28 January 1956		
9	Bristol Rovers	1–1	Doncaster Rovers	28 January 1956		
Replay	Doncaster Rovers	1–0	Bristol Rovers	31 January 1956		
10	West Ham United	2–1	Cardiff City	28 January 1956		
11	Southend United	0–1	Manchester City	28 January 1956		
12	Port Vale	2–3	Everton	28 January 1956	44,278	
13	Charlton Athletic	2–1	Swindon Town	28 January 1956		
14	Arsenal	4–1	Aston Villa	28 January 1956	43,052	
15	York City	0–0	Sunderland	28 January 1956	22,000	
Replay	Sunderland	2–1	York City	1 February 1956	43,928	
16	Leyton Orient	0–4	Birmingham City	28 January 1956	24,727	

=== Fifth round proper ===
The matches were played on Saturday, 18 February 1956. Three matches were drawn, with replays taking place later that week.

Tie no	Home team	Score	Away team	Date	Attendance	Summary
1	West Bromwich Albion	0–1	Birmingham City	18 February 1956	58,213	
2	Everton	1–0	Chelsea	18 February 1956	61,572	
3	Doncaster Rovers	0–2	Tottenham Hotspur	18 February 1956	30,436	
4	Sheffield United	0–0	Sunderland	18 February 1956	51,516	
Replay	Sunderland	1–0	Sheffield United	22 February 1956	39,883	
5	Newcastle United	2–1	Stoke City	18 February 1956	61,550	
6	Manchester City	0–0	Liverpool	18 February 1956	70,640	
Replay	Liverpool	1–2	Manchester City	22 February 1956	57,528	
7	West Ham United	0–0	Blackburn Rovers	18 February 1956		
Replay	Blackburn Rovers	2–3	West Ham United	23 February 1956		
8	Charlton Athletic	0–2	Arsenal	18 February 1956	71,758	

== Final rounds ==
=== Sixth round proper ===
3 March 1956

Newcastle United	0–2	Sunderland
		Holden 41', 83'

St James' Park, Newcastle upon Tyne
Attendance: 61,500

3 March 1956

Tottenham Hotspur	3–3	West Ham United
Harmer (pen.); Robb; Duquemin		Dick

White Hart Lane, London
Attendance: 69,118

3 March 1956

Manchester City	2–1	Everton
Hayes; Johnstone		Harris

Maine Road, Manchester
Attendance: 76,129

3 March 1956

Arsenal	1–3	Birmingham City
Charlton		Astall; Murphy; Brown

Highbury, London
Attendance: 67,872

==== Replay ====
8 March 1956

West Ham United	1–2	Tottenham Hotspur
Dare		Harmer; Duquemin

Boleyn Ground, London
Attendance: 36,000

=== Semi-finals ===
17 March 1956

Manchester City	1–0	Tottenham Hotspur
Johnstone

Villa Park, Birmingham
Attendance: 69,788

17 March 1956

Birmingham City	3–0	Sunderland
Astall 9'; Brown 65'; Kinsey 83'

Hillsborough, Sheffield
Attendance: 65,107

=== Final ===
The final took place on Saturday, 5 May 1956 at Wembley and ended 3–1, with goals scored by Joe Hayes, Bobby Johnstone and Jack Dyson for Manchester City and Noel Kinsey for Birmingham City. The attendance was 100,000. The match is remembered for an incident where Manchester City goalkeeper Bert Trautmann sustained a neck injury diving at the feet of Birmingham attacker Peter Murphy; he completed the game in considerable pain, and later examination discovered he had broken a bone in his neck.

5 May 1956
15:00 BST

Manchester City	3–1	Birmingham City
Hayes 3'; Johnstone 62'; Dyson 64'		Kinsey 15'

Wembley, London
Attendance: 100,000
Referee: Alf Bond

Manchester City	Birmingham City
