= List of Manchester City F.C. seasons =

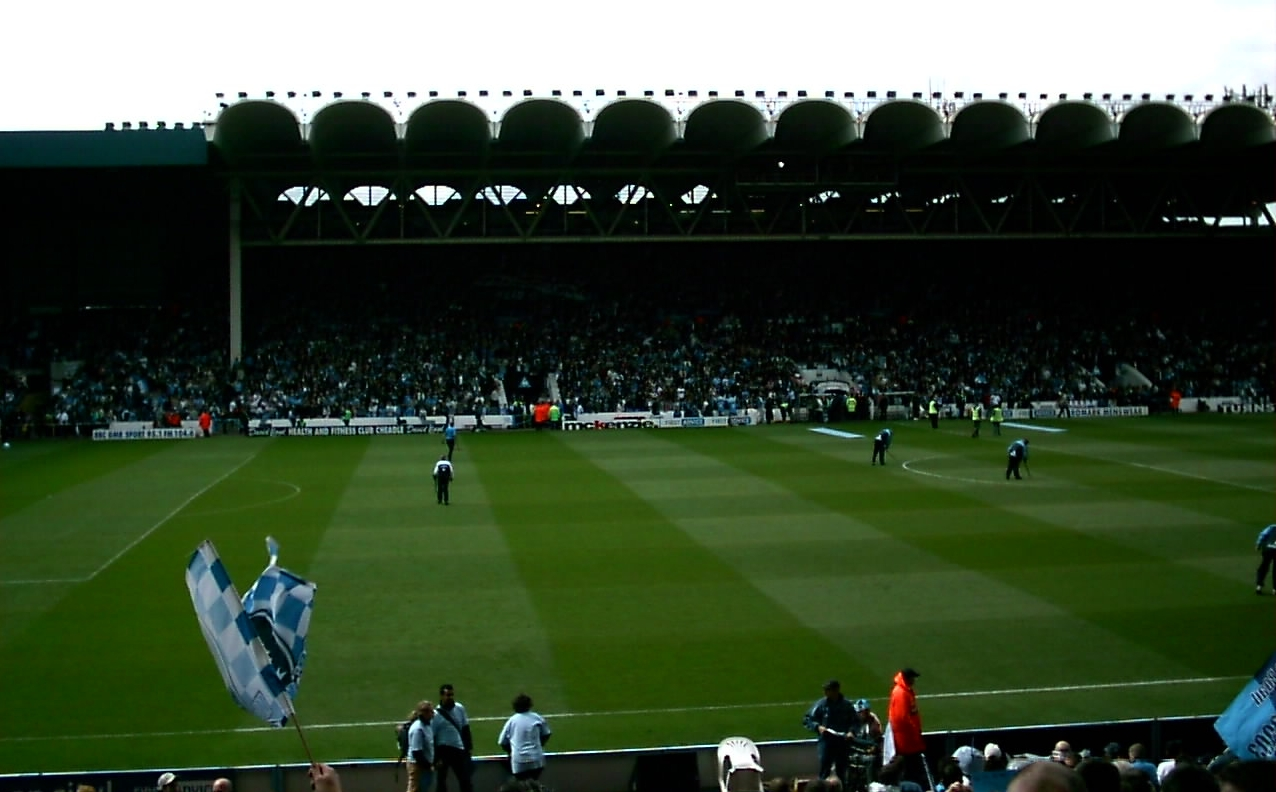
Maine Road was Manchester City's home for 80 years (1923–2003). Initially built with a capacity of 80,000, it was the largest football stadium in the country after Wembley Stadium at that time.

Manchester City Football Club is an English professional association football club based in Manchester, that currently plays in the Premier League. The following list covers the period from 1891 (when the club, then known as Ardwick, joined the Football Alliance) to the present day. It details the club's achievements in senior league and cup competitions, and the top scorers for each season. The club was renamed Manchester City F.C. in 1894, and moved to Maine Road in 1923. Since 2003, they have played at the City of Manchester Stadium, currently known as the Etihad Stadium for sponsorship reasons. Manchester City's biggest rivals are Manchester United whom they play in the Manchester derby. A more recent rivalry with Liverpool has overshadowed the derby in recent years due to both City and Liverpool directly competing for the titles against each other.

== Background ==
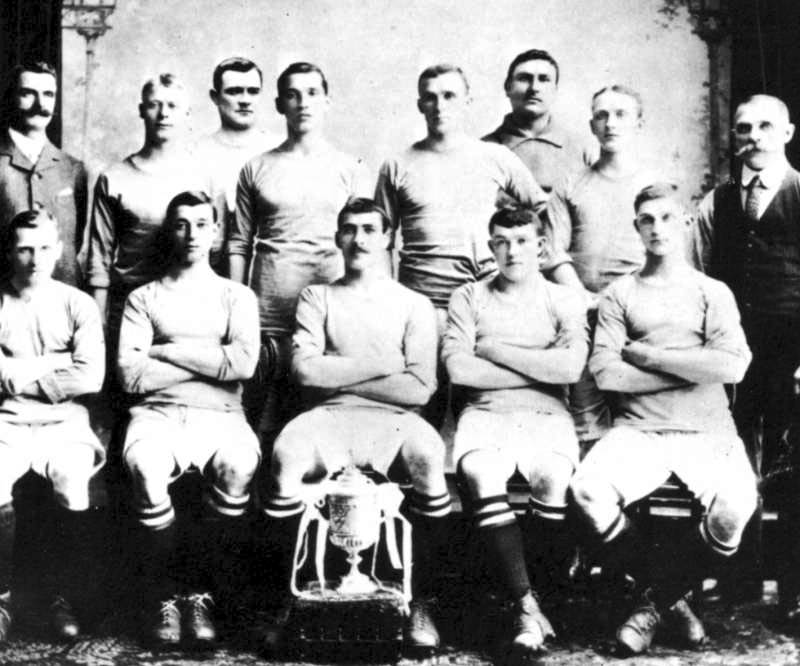
The Manchester City team that won the FA Cup in 1904, the club's first major honour.

Manchester City were formed in 1880 as West Gorton (St. Marks). At this time organised league football did not exist; ordinary matches (that today would be called friendly games) were arranged on a largely ad hoc basis and supplemented by the competitive games that cup competition required. No complete record of the club's matches prior to 1891 survives. In 1890, the club entered the FA Cup for the first time, but withdrew in the second qualifying round. The following season, they joined the Football Alliance and in 1892 were elected to the newly formed Football League Second Division. In 1894, the club restructured, changing its name to Manchester City in the process.

City first reached the highest division of English league football in 1899. Since then City have undergone a further 22 promotions and relegations, though the majority of their history has been spent in the top division of English football. The club has won the League Championship / Premier League ten times, the FA Cup eight times, the Football League / EFL Cup nine times, the Community Shield / Charity Shield seven times and the UEFA Champions League, UEFA Super Cup, European Cup Winners' Cup and FIFA Club World Cup once each for a total of 38 official titles.

In 1970, League Cup and European Cup Winners' Cup victories were both achieved in the same season, making Manchester City only the second English club (Leeds United were the first in 1968) to achieve a European cup double within the same year, and the first English club to do so within the same season. The Blues were also the last team to win the English league championship with a team consisting entirely of players of English nationality (many of whom were also native Mancunians). They are, as of 2023, the only English club to win all major domestic honours in the same season (in 2018–19). In 2023, Manchester City achieved their greatest success so far, winning the prestigious continental treble, which included the club's first-ever European Cup title.

Graph depicting Manchester City's league placings in 1892–2026

As of the 2025–26 season, Manchester City have played 5,662 competitive matches. In that time the club has spent 97 seasons in the top division of English football, 26 seasons in the second, and one season in the third.

== Seasons ==
Table correct as of the end of the 2025–26 season.

Champions	Runners-up	Division winners	Division runners-up	Promoted	Relegated	Current season

Season	League										FAC	LC	CS	UEFA FIFA					Other		Top scorer(s) (Note: Figures include goals in the domestic league, FA Cup, EFL Cup, FA Community Shield, European and international competitions, as well as other domestic/continental tournaments and play-offs/test matches.)	Goals
Season	League	Tier	Pld	W	D	L	GF	GA	Pts	Pos	FAC	LC	CS	CL	EL	CWC	SC	FCWC	Other		Top scorer(s)	Goals
1891–92	Alliance		22	6	6	10	39	51	18	8th	1QR										Morris	10
1892–93	Div 2	2	22	9	3	10	45	40	21	5th	PR										Weir	8
1893–94	Div 2	2	28	8	2	18	47	71	18	13th	1QR										Morris	7
1894–95	Div 2	2	30	14	3	13	82	72	31	9th	DNE (Note: An administrative error meant the club did not enter the FA Cup in 1895.)										Finnerhan	15
1895–96	Div 2	2	30	21	4	5	63	38	46	2nd (Note: Failed to gain promotion after test matches.)	WD (Note: The club withdrew from the FA Cup during the qualifying rounds both in 1890–91 and 1895–96. The reasons for withdrawal are unclear.)										Meredith	13
1896–97	Div 2	2	30	12	8	10	58	50	32	6th	R1										Meredith	10
1897–98	Div 2	2	30	15	9	6	66	36	39	3rd	R2										Gillespie	19
1898–99	Div 2 ↑	2	34	23	6	5	92	35	52	1st	R1										Meredith	30
1899–1900	Div 1	1	34	13	8	13	50	44	34	7th	R1										Meredith	14
1900–01	Div 1	1	34	13	6	15	48	58	32	11th	R1										Cassidy	15
1901–02	Div 1 ↓	1	34	11	6	17	42	58	28	18th	R2										Gillespie	15
1902–03	Div 2 ↑	2	34	25	4	5	95	29	54	1st	R1										Gillespie	30
1903–04	Div 1	1	34	19	6	9	71	45	44	2nd	W										Gillespie Turnbull	21
1904–05	Div 1	1	34	20	6	8	66	37	46	3rd	R2										Turnbull	20
1905–06	Div 1	1	38	19	5	14	73	54	43	5th	R1										Thornley	21
1906–07	Div 1	1	38	10	12	16	53	77	32	17th	R1										Thornley	14
1907–08	Div 1	1	38	16	11	11	62	54	43	3rd	R3										Thornley	14
1908–09	Div 1 ↓	1	38	15	4	19	67	69	34	19th	R1										Thornley	18
1909–10	Div 2 ↑	2	38	23	8	7	81	40	54	1st	R4										Dorsett Jones	14
1910–11	Div 1	1	38	9	13	16	43	58	31	17th	R2										Wynn	9
1911–12	Div 1	1	38	13	9	16	56	58	35	15th	R2										Wynn	18
1912–13	Div 1	1	38	18	8	12	53	37	44	6th	R2										Wynn	16
1913–14	Div 1	1	38	14	8	16	51	53	36	13th	R4										Browell	14
1914–15	Div 1	1	38	15	13	10	49	39	43	5th	R3										Howard	18
No competitive football was played between 1915 and 1919 due to the First World War. During the war, the club played in the Lancashire section of the non-competitive War Leagues.
1915–16	War		26	16	3	7	61	35	35	1st	n/a								Sub Tnmt (Note: The Subsidiary Tournament was a round-robin competition played following the completion of league fixtures.)	1st	Barnes	36
1916–17	War		30	14	9	7	49	29	37	4th	n/a								Sub Tnmt	4th	Barnes	16
1917–18	War		30	15	8	7	53	28	38	4th	n/a								Sub Tnmt	1st	Lomas	22
1918–19	War		30	15	3	12	57	36	33	5th	n/a								Sub Tnmt	1st	Barnes	20
1919–20	Div 1	1	42	18	9	15	71	62	45	7th	R2										Barnes	23
1920–21	Div 1	1	42	24	6	12	70	50	54	2nd	R1										Browell	32
1921–22	Div 1	1	42	18	9	15	65	70	45	10th	R3										Browell	26
1922–23	Div 1	1	42	17	11	14	50	49	45	8th	R1										Barnes	21
1923–24	Div 1	1	42	15	12	15	54	71	42	11th	SF										Barnes	22
1924–25	Div 1	1	42	17	9	16	76	68	43	10th	R1										Roberts	32
1925–26	Div 1 ↓	1	42	12	11	19	89	100	35	21st	RU										Roberts	30
1926–27	Div 2	2	42	22	10	10	108	61	54	3rd	R3										Johnson	25
1927–28	Div 2 ↑	2	42	25	9	8	100	59	59	1st	R5										Johnson Roberts	20
1928–29	Div 1	1	42	18	9	15	95	86	45	8th	R3										Johnson	38
1929–30	Div 1	1	42	19	9	14	91	81	47	3rd	R5										Tait	31
1930–31	Div 1	1	42	18	10	14	75	70	46	8th	R3										Brook	17
1931–32	Div 1	1	42	13	12	17	83	73	38	14th	SF										Halliday	32
1932–33	Div 1	1	42	16	5	21	68	71	37	16th	RU										Tilson	23
1933–34	Div 1	1	42	17	11	14	65	72	45	5th	W										Herd	21
1934–35	Div 1	1	42	20	8	14	82	67	48	4th	R3		RU								Tilson	18
1935–36	Div 1	1	42	17	8	17	68	60	42	9th	R5										Brook	16
1936–37	Div 1	1	42	22	13	7	107	61	57	1st	QF										Doherty	32
1937–38	Div 1 ↓	1	42	14	8	20	80	77	36	21st	QF		W								Doherty	26
1938–39	Div 2	2	42	21	7	14	96	72	49	5th	R4										Herd	22
1939–40	Div 2	2	3	1	1	1	6	5	3	— (Note: The 1939–40 English football season was abandoned in early September after only three matches had been played, and all results were later annulled due to the onset of the Second World War.)	n/a										n/a	n/a
No competitive football was played between 1939 and 1946 due to the Second World War. During the war, the club played in the non-competitive War Leagues.
1939–40	War		22	12	4	6	63	41	26	4th	n/a								War Cup	R1	Herd	19
1940–41	War		35	18	10	7	104	55	46	3rd	n/a								War Cup	QF	Currier	47
1941–42	War		18 17	8 9	3 1	7 7	48 33	54 26	21 19	17th n/a (Note: Unplaced. 18 matches or more were required for a team to be placed.)	n/a								War Cup	R3	Boothway Boothway	22 12
1942–43	War		18 19	7 11	1 5	10 3	46 41	54 24	47 27	30th 3rd	n/a								War Cup	R3	Currier Currier	11 15
1943–44	War		18 21	9 10	2 5	7 6	38 55	35 36	20 25	17th 19th	n/a								War Cup	SF	Doherty Heale	12 13
1944–45	War		18 19	9 7	4 2	5 10	53 32	31 43	22 16	10th 47th	n/a								War Cup	R1	Smith Williamson	14 10
1945–46	War (Note: The FA Cup was contested in 1945–46 but the Football League did not resume until the following season.)		42	19	4	19	78	75	42	10th	R4										Constantine	29 (Note: Four of these goals were scored in the FA Cup.)
1946–47	Div 2 ↑	2	42	26	10	6	78	35	62	1st	R5										Smith	23
1947–48	Div 1	1	42	15	12	15	52	47	42	10th	R5										Black	17
1948–49	Div 1	1	42	15	15	12	47	51	45	7th	R3										Smith	13
1949–50	Div 1 ↓	1	42	8	13	21	36	68	29	21st	R3										Clarke	10
1950–51	Div 2 ↑	2	42	19	14	9	89	61	52	2nd	R3										Westcott	26
1951–52	Div 1	1	42	13	13	16	58	61	39	15th	R3										Hart Westcott	11
1952–53	Div 1	1	42	14	7	21	72	87	35	20th	R4										Spurdle Williamson	12
1953–54	Div 1	1	42	14	9	19	62	77	37	17th	R4										Revie	13
1954–55	Div 1	1	42	18	10	14	76	69	46	7th	RU										Hart Hayes	15
1955–56	Div 1	1	42	18	10	14	82	69	46	4th	W										Hayes	27
1956–57	Div 1	1	42	13	9	20	78	88	35	18th	R3		RU								Johnstone	19
1957–58	Div 1	1	42	22	5	15	104	100	49	5th	R3										Hayes	26
1958–59	Div 1	1	42	11	9	22	64	95	31	20th	R3										Barlow	18
1959–60	Div 1	1	42	17	3	22	78	84	37	16th	R3										McAdams	22
1960–61	Div 1	1	42	13	11	18	79	90	37	13th	R4	R3									Law	23
1961–62	Div 1	1	42	17	7	18	78	81	41	12th	R4	R1									Dobing	22
1962–63	Div 1 ↓	1	42	10	11	21	58	102	31	21st	R5	QF									Harley	32
1963–64	Div 2	2	42	18	10	14	84	66	46	6th	R3	SF									Kevan	36
1964–65	Div 2	2	42	16	9	17	63	62	41	11th	R3	R2									Kevan	20
1965–66	Div 2 ↑	2	42	22	15	5	76	44	59	1st	QF	R3									Young	17
1966–67	Div 1	1	42	12	15	15	43	52	39	15th	QF	R3									Bell	14
1967–68	Div 1	1	42	26	6	10	86	43	58	1st	R4	R4									Young	21
1968–69	Div 1	1	42	15	10	17	64	55	40	13th	W	R3	W	R32							Lee	18
1969–70	Div 1	1	42	16	11	15	55	48	43	10th	R4	W	RU			W					Bell Lee	22
1970–71	Div 1	1	42	12	17	13	47	42	41	11th	R5	R2				SF			A–I LC	RU	Bell Lee	19
1971–72	Div 1	1	42	23	11	8	77	45	57	4th	R3	R3							Tex Cup	R1	Lee	35
1972–73	Div 1	1	42	15	11	16	57	60	41	11th	R5	R3	W		R64						Marsh	19
1973–74	Div 1	1	42	14	12	16	39	46	40	14th	R4	RU	RU								Lee	18
1974–75	Div 1	1	42	18	10	14	54	54	46	8th	R3	R3							Tex Cup	GS	Bell	18
1975–76	Div 1	1	42	16	11	15	64	46	43	8th	R4	W							A–S Cup	GS	Tueart	24
1976–77	Div 1	1	42	21	14	7	60	34	56	2nd	R5	R2			R64				TCC	3rd	Kidd	23
1977–78	Div 1	1	42	20	12	10	74	51	52	4th	R4	QF			R64						Kidd	20
1978–79	Div 1	1	42	13	13	16	58	56	39	15th	R4	QF			QF						Channon	15
1979–80	Div 1	1	42	12	13	17	43	66	37	17th	R3	R3									Robinson	9
1980–81	Div 1	1	42	14	11	17	56	59	39	12th	RU	SF									Reeves	17
1981–82	Div 1	1	42	15	13	14	49	50	58 (Note: The 1981–82 season saw the introduction of three points for a win.)	10th	R4	R4									Francis	14
1982–83	Div 1 ↓	1	42	13	8	21	47	70	47	20th	R4	R3									Cross	13
1983–84	Div 2	2	42	20	10	12	66	48	70	4th	R3	R3									Parlane	19
1984–85	Div 2 ↑	2	42	21	11	10	66	40	74	3rd	R3	R4									Smith	14
1985–86	Div 1	1	42	11	12	19	43	57	45	15th	R4	R3							FMC	RU	Lillis	12
1986–87	Div 1 ↓	1	42	8	15	19	36	57	39	21st	R3	R3							FMC	QF	Varadi	9
1987–88	Div 2	2	44	19	8	17	80	60	65	9th	QF	QF							FMC	R2	Stewart	27
1988–89	Div 2 ↑	2	46	23	13	10	77	53	82	2nd	R4	R4							FMC	R1	Moulden	17
1989–90	Div 1	1	38	12	12	14	43	52	48	14th	R3	R4							FMC	R2	Allen	11
1990–91	Div 1	1	38	17	11	10	64	53	62	5th	R5	R3							FMC	QF	Quinn	21
1991–92	Div 1	1	42	20	10	12	61	48	70	5th	R3	R4							FMC	R2	White	21
1992–93	Prem (Note: Up until 1992, the top division of English football was the Football League First Division; since then, it has been the FA Premier League. At the same time, the Second Division was renamed the First Division, and the Third Division was renamed the Second Division.)	1	42	15	12	15	56	51	57	9th	QF	R3									White	19
1993–94	Prem	1	42	9	18	15	38	49	45	16th	R4	R4									Quinn Sheron	6
1994–95	Prem	1	42	12	13	17	53	64	49	17th	R5	QF									Rösler	22
1995–96	Prem ↓	1	38	9	11	18	33	58	38	18th	R5	R3									Rösler	13
1996–97	Div 1	2	46	17	10	19	59	60	61	14th	R5	R2									Rösler	16
1997–98	Div 1 ↓	2	46	12	12	22	56	57	48	22nd	R4	R1									Dickov	9
1998–99	Div 2 ↑	3	46	22	16	8	69	33	82	3rd (Note: Promoted via play-offs.) (Note: Lowest league finish.)	R3	R2							FLT	R1	Goater	22
1999–2000	Div 1 ↑	2	46	26	11	9	78	40	89	2nd	R4	R2									Goater	29
2000–01	Prem ↓	1	38	8	10	20	41	65	34	18th	R5	QF									Goater	11
2001–02	Div 1 ↑	2	46	31	6	9	108	52	99	1st	R5	R4									Goater	32
2002–03	Prem	1	38	15	6	17	47	54	51	9th	R3	R3									Anelka	14
2003–04	Prem	1	38	9	14	15	55	54	41	16th	R5	R4			R64						Anelka	24
2004–05	Prem	1	38	13	13	12	47	39	52	8th	R3	R3									Fowler Wright-Phillips	11
2005–06	Prem	1	38	13	4	21	43	48	43	15th	QF	R2									Cole Vassell	10
2006–07	Prem	1	38	11	9	18	29	44	42	14th	QF	R2									Barton	7
2007–08	Prem	1	38	15	10	13	45	53	55	9th	R4	QF									Elano	10
2008–09	Prem	1	38	15	5	18	58	50	50	10th	R3	R2			QF						Robinho	15
2009–10	Prem	1	38	18	13	7	73	45	67	5th	R5	SF									Tevez	29
2010–11	Prem	1	38	21	8	9	60	33	71	3rd	W	R3			R16						Tevez	23
2011–12	Prem	1	38	28	5	5	93	29	89	1st	R3	SF	RU	GS	R16						Agüero	30
2012–13	Prem	1	38	23	9	6	66	34	78	2nd	RU	R3	W	GS							Tevez Agüero	17
2013–14	Prem	1	38	27	5	6	102	37	86	1st	QF	W		R16							Agüero	28
2014–15	Prem	1	38	24	7	7	83	38	79	2nd	R4	R4	RU	R16							Agüero	32
2015–16	Prem	1	38	19	9	10	71	41	66	4th	R5	W		SF							Agüero	29
2016–17	Prem	1	38	23	9	6	80	39	78	3rd	SF	R4		R16							Agüero	33
2017–18	Prem	1	38	32	4	2	106	27	100	1st	R5	W		QF							Agüero	30
2018–19 (Note: Manchester City became the first English men's side to win all four senior domestic competitions in a single season.)	Prem	1	38	32	2	4	95	23	98	1st	W	W	W	QF							Agüero	32
2019–20	Prem	1	38	26	3	9	102	35	81	2nd	SF	W	W	QF							Sterling	31
2020–21	Prem	1	38	27	5	6	83	32	86	1st	SF	W		RU							Gündoğan	17
2021–22	Prem	1	38	29	6	3	99	26	93	1st	SF	R4	RU	SF							Mahrez	24
2022–23 (Note: Manchester City became only the second-ever English men's side to win the continental treble.)	Prem	1	38	28	5	5	94	33	89	1st	W	QF	RU	W							Haaland	52
2023–24 (Note: Manchester City became the first English men's side to win four consecutive league titles.)	Prem	1	38	28	7	3	96	34	91	1st	RU	R3	RU	QF			W	W			Haaland	38
2024–25	Prem	1	38	21	8	9	72	44	71	3rd	RU	R4	W	KPO				R16			Haaland	34
2025–26	Prem	1	38	23	9	6	77	35	78	2nd	W	W		R16							Haaland	38
Season	Division	Tier	Pld	W	D	L	GF	GA	Pts	Pos	FAC	LC	CS	CL	EL	CWC	SC	FCWC	Other		Top scorer(s)	Goals
Season	League										FAC	LC	CS	UEFA FIFA					Other		Top scorer(s)	Goals

=== Key ===
- Pld – Matches played
- W – Matches won
- D – Matches drawn
- L – Matches lost
- GF – Goals for
- GA – Goals against
- Pts – Points
- Pos – Final position
- Alln – Football Alliance
- Div 1 – Football League First Division
- Div 2 – Football League Second Division
- Prem – Premier League
- n/a – Not applicable
- PR – Preliminary round
- (1)QR – (First) Qualifying round
- PO – Play-off round
- GS – Group stage
- LP – League phase
- R1 – Round 1
- R2 – Round 2
- R3 – Round 3
- R4 – Round 4
- R5 – Round 5
- R64 – Round of 64
- R32 – Round of 32
- R16 – Round of 16
- KPO – Knockout phase play-offs
- QF – Quarter-finals
- SF – Semi-finals
- F – Finalists
- RU – Runners-up
- W – Winners

Other minor tournaments

- Sub Tnmt – Subsidiary Tournament
- A–I Cup – Anglo-Italian Cup
- Tex Cup – Texaco Cup
- A–S Cup – Anglo-Scottish Cup
- TCC – Tennent Caledonian Cup
- FMC – Full Members' Cup
- FLT – Football League Trophy

Champions	Runners-up	Division winners	Division runners-up	Promoted	Relegated	Current season
