= Bert Trautmann =

German footballer and coach (1923–2013)

Bert Trautmann OBE
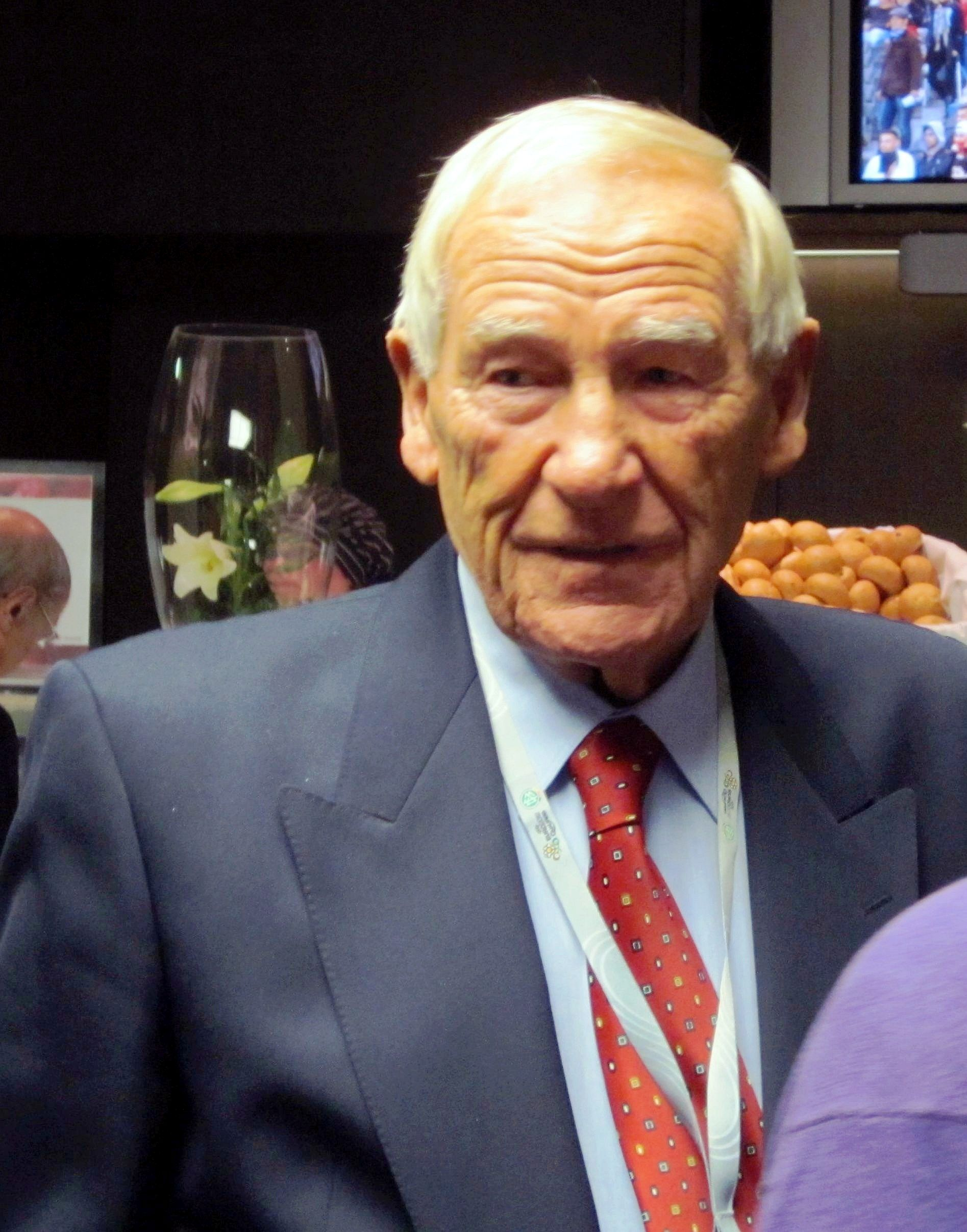
- Trautmann at an event at the Olympiastadion in Berlin in October 2010
- Born: Bernhard Carl Trautmann; 22 October 1923; Bremen, Germany
- Died: 19 July 2013 (aged 89); La Llosa, Castellón, Spain
- Spouses: Margaret Friar (m. 1950; div. 1972) Ursula von der Heyde (m. 1974; div. 1982) Marlis Trautmann (m. 1986)
- Children: 4
Association football career
- Height: 1.89 m (6 ft 2 in)
- Position: Goalkeeper
Youth career
- Blau und Weiss
Senior career*
Years	Team	Apps	(Gls)
1948–1949	St Helens Town	43	(0)
1949–1964	Manchester City	508	(0)
1964	Wellington Town	7	(0)
Total		558	(0)
Managerial career
- 1965–1966: Stockport County
- 1967–1968: Preußen Münster
- 1968–1969: Opel Rüsselsheim
- 1972–1974: Burma
- 1975: Tanzania (adviser)
- 1978–1980: Liberia (adviser)
- 1981–1983: Pakistan (adviser)
- 1983–1988: North Yemen (adviser)
- * Club domestic league appearances and goals
- Military career
- Allegiance: Nazi Germany
- Branch: Luftwaffe
- Service years: 1941–1944
- Rank: Feldwebel
- Unit: 35th Infantry Division
- Awards: 5 medals (inc. Iron Cross First Class)

Bernhard Carl "Bert" Trautmann (22 October 1923 – 19 July 2013) was a German professional footballer who played as a goalkeeper.

Born in Bremen in 1923, he joined the Jungvolk, the junior section of the Hitler Youth in August 1933. Trautmann joined the Luftwaffe early in the Second World War, and then served as a paratrooper. He was initially sent to occupied Poland, and subsequently fought on the Eastern Front for three years, earning five medals, including an Iron Cross. Later in the war, he was transferred to the Western Front, where he was captured by the British as the war drew to a close. As a volunteer soldier, he was classified a category "C" prisoner by the authorities, meaning he was regarded as a Nazi. One of only 90 of his original 1,000-man regiment to survive the war, he was transferred to a prisoner-of-war camp in Ashton-in-Makerfield, Lancashire. Trautmann refused an offer of repatriation, and following his release in 1948 decided to settle in Lancashire, combining farm work with playing goalkeeper for a local football team, St Helens Town.

Performances for St Helens gained Trautmann a reputation as an outstanding goalkeeper, resulting in interest from Football League clubs. In October 1949, he signed for Manchester City, a club playing in the country's highest level of football, the First Division. The club's decision to sign a former Axis paratrooper sparked protests, and 20,000 people attended a demonstration. Over time, he gained acceptance through his performances in the City goal, playing in all but five of the club's next 250 matches.

Named FWA Footballer of the Year for 1956, Trautmann entered football folklore with his performance in the 1956 FA Cup final. With 17 minutes of the match remaining, Trautmann suffered a serious injury while diving at the feet of Birmingham City's Peter Murphy. Despite his injury, he continued to play, making crucial saves to preserve his team's 3–1 lead. His neck was noticeably crooked as he collected his winner's medal; three days later an X-ray revealed it to be broken.

Trautmann played for Manchester City until 1964, making 545 appearances. After his playing career, he moved into management, first with lower-division sides in England and Germany, and later as part of a German Football Association development scheme that took him to several countries, including Burma, Tanzania and Pakistan. In 2004, he was appointed an honorary Officer of the Order of the British Empire (OBE) for promoting Anglo-German understanding through football. In 2013, Trautmann died at home near Valencia, Spain, aged 89.

== Early life in Germany ==
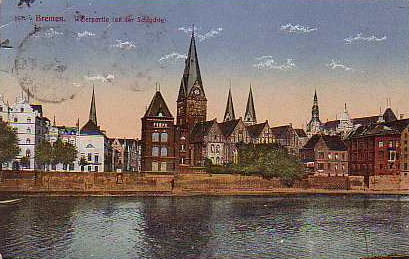
Trautmann's birthplace, Bremen, in the 1920s

Bernhard Carl Trautmann was born on 22 October 1923 in Walle, a working-class area in west Bremen, living with his father, who worked in a fertiliser factory by the docks, and his mother Frieda. He had a brother, Karl-Heinz, three years his junior, with whom he enjoyed a close relationship. The bleak economic climate of the early 1930s forced the Trautmanns to sell their house and move to an apartment block in the working-class area of Gröpelingen, where Bernhard lived until 1941.

The young Bernhard had a keen interest in sport, playing football, handball and völkerball (a form of dodgeball). To this end, he joined the YMCA and football club Blau und Weiss. He took to playing for the football club with enthusiasm, but the YMCA activities did not interest him to the same extent.

In August 1933, he joined a new organisation, the Jungvolk, the junior section of the Hitler Youth. The following year, he won several local junior athletics events and was awarded a certificate for athletic excellence signed by Paul von Hindenburg, the President of Germany. At the onset of the Second World War, Trautmann was working as an apprentice motor mechanic.

== Second World War ==
Trautmann joined the Luftwaffe as a radio operator in 1941. During training, he showed little aptitude for radio work, and transferred to Spandau to become a Fallschirmjäger (paratrooper). He first served in Occupied Poland, although being stationed far behind the front line meant experiencing prolonged bouts of monotony; consequently, Trautmann and the rest of his regiment resorted to sports and practical jokes to pass the time. One such practical joke involving a car backfired on Trautmann, resulting in a staff sergeant burning his arms. Trautmann was court-martialled over this incident and sentenced to three months in prison. At the start of his confinement, Trautmann came down with acute appendicitis, and spent the remainder of his sentence in a military hospital.

In October 1941, he rejoined the 35th Infantry Division at Dnepropetrovsk, Ukraine, where the German advance had halted. Over-winter hit-and-run attacks on Soviet Army supply routes were the unit's main focus and in spring, Trautmann was promoted to Unteroffizier (corporal). Gains were made in 1942, but the Soviet counter-offensive hit Trautmann's unit hard, and by the time it was withdrawn from the Eastern Front, only 300 of the original 1,000 men remained. Trautmann won five medals for his actions on the Eastern Front, including an Iron Cross First Class.

Promoted to Feldwebel (sergeant), Trautmann was part of a unit formed from the remnants of several others that had been decimated in the east, and moved to France to guard against an expected Allied invasion of France. In 1945, he was one of the few survivors of the Allied bombing of Kleve, and decided to return to Bremen. By this point, German soldiers without valid leave papers were being shot as deserters, so Trautmann sought to avoid troops from either side. However, a few days later, he was captured in a barn by two Allied soldiers. Deciding that Trautmann had no useful intelligence to give them, the soldiers marched him out of the barn with his hands raised. Fearing he was about to be executed, Trautmann fled. After evading his captors, he jumped over a fence, only to land at the feet of a British soldier, who greeted him with the words "Hello Fritz, fancy a cup of tea?" Earlier in the war, he had been captured by the Soviets and later the French, but escaped both times.

He was imprisoned near Ostend, Belgium, then transferred to a transit camp in Essex, where he was interrogated. As a volunteer soldier who had been subject to indoctrination from a young age, he was classified a category "C" prisoner by the authorities, meaning he was regarded as a Nazi. Trautmann, one of only 90 of his original regiment to survive the war, was then transferred to a prisoner-of-war camp at Marbury Hall, near Northwich, Cheshire, and interned with other category "C" prisoners. He was soon downgraded to non-Nazi "B" status, after which he was taken to Fort Crosby in Hightown near Liverpool where he stayed for a short while working on local farms and mixing with the locals; from here he was sent to PoW Camp 50 (now Byrchall High School) in Ashton-in-Makerfield in Lancashire between St Helens and Wigan, where he stayed until 1948.

Football matches were regularly held at the camp, in which Trautmann played outfield. However, in a match against amateur team Haydock Park, Trautmann was injured while playing centre-half. He swapped positions with goalkeeper Günther Lühr, and from that day forward played as a goalkeeper. During this time he became known as "Bert", as the English were unfamiliar with "Bernd", the abbreviated version of his name.

== Football career ==
=== Early years ===
With closure of the PoW camp imminent, Trautmann declined an offer of repatriation and stayed in England, working on a farm in Milnthorpe then subsequently working on bomb disposal in Huyton.

In August 1948, he started playing amateur football for the non-league Liverpool County Combination club St Helens Town, through which he met the club secretary's daughter, Margaret Friar, whom he later married. Over the course of the 1948–49 season, Trautmann's goalkeeping reputation steadily grew and a series of large crowds were attributed to his performances, including a record 9,000 attendance in the final of a local cup competition, the Mahon Cup. The success of that season elevated the club into Division Two of the Lancashire Combination League for the start of 1949–50.

=== Manchester City ===
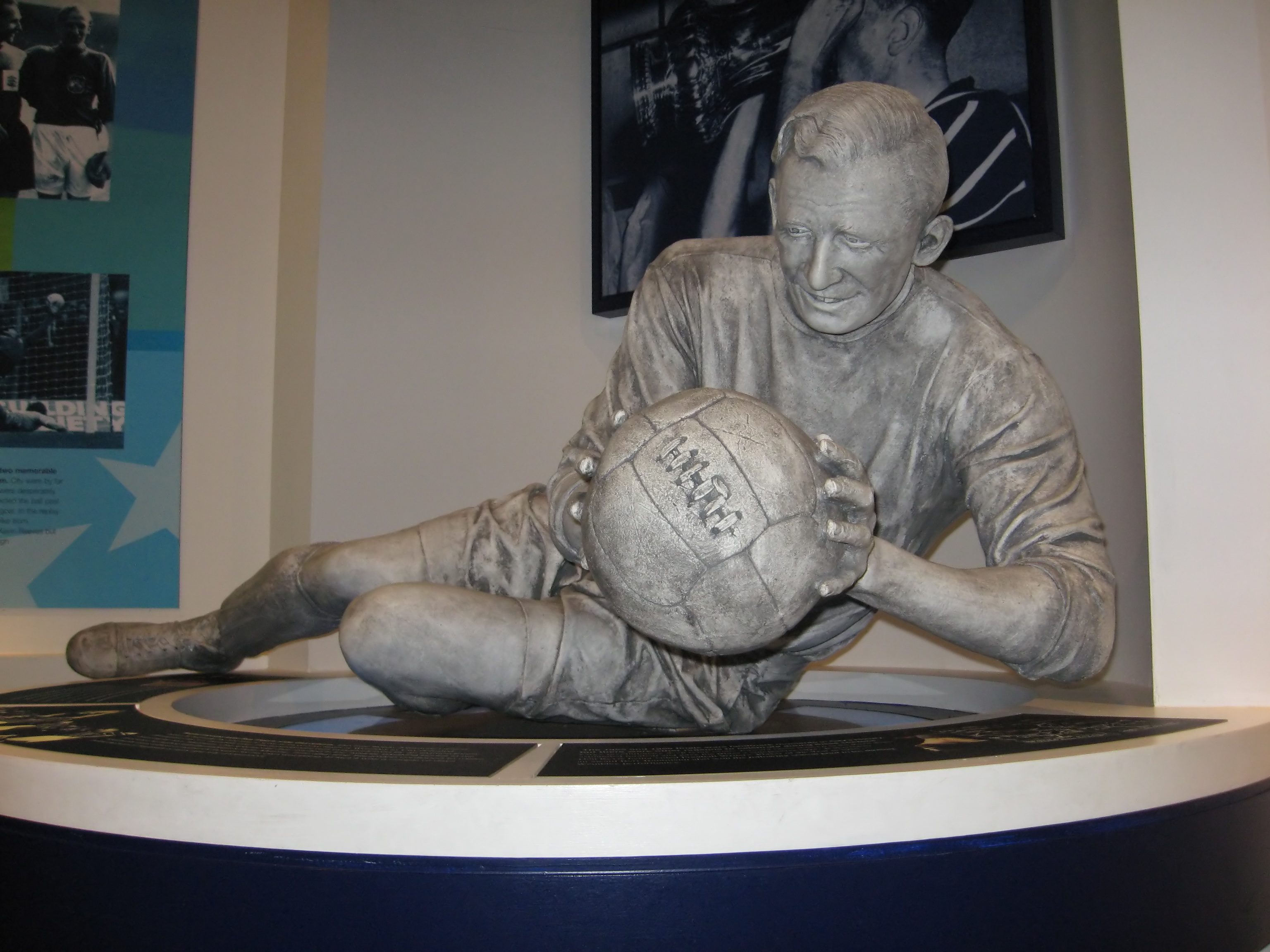
Sculpture of Trautmann at the Manchester City Museum, UK

Performances for St Helens gained Trautmann a reputation as an able goalkeeper, resulting in interest from Football League clubs. As the following season commenced, a number of League clubs showed interest in signing him. The first to offer him a contract was Manchester City, a club playing in the highest level of football in the country, the First Division. On 7 October 1949 Trautmann signed for the club as an amateur and turned professional shortly after. Trautmann became the first sportsman in Britain to wear Adidas, thanks to his friendship with Adolf Dassler.

==== Supporter discontent and initial period ====
Some Manchester City fans were unhappy about signing a former member of the German Army. Season ticket holders threatened a boycott, and various groups in Manchester and around the country bombarded the club with protest letters. In addition to this difficulty, Trautmann was replacing the recently retired Frank Swift, one of the greatest keepers in the club's history. Though privately expressing doubts about the signing, the club captain, Eric Westwood, a Normandy veteran, made a public display of welcoming Trautmann by announcing, "There's no war in this dressing room". Trautmann made his first team debut on 19 November against Bolton Wanderers, and after a competent display in his first home match, protests shrank as fans discovered his talent. Before his first home game, Alexander Altmann, the community rabbi of Manchester, had written a remarkable open letter to the Manchester Evening Chronicle, appealing to City fans and the Jewish community to treat Trautmann with respect. He continued to receive abuse from crowds at away matches, which affected his concentration in some early games; in December 1949, he conceded seven goals at Derby County.

City's match against Fulham in January 1950 was Trautmann's first visit to London. The match received widespread media attention, as most of the British press were based there; several leading sportswriters watched Trautmann in action for the first time. The damage caused to the city by the Luftwaffe meant former paratrooper Trautmann was a target of hatred for the crowd, who yelled "Kraut" and "Nazi". City were struggling in the league, and widely expected to suffer a heavy defeat but a string of saves from Trautmann meant the final score was a narrow 1–0 loss. At the final whistle, Trautmann received a standing ovation, and was applauded off the pitch by both sets of players. The Manchester City team struggled throughout the season, and was relegated to the Second Division.

Manchester City returned to the top flight at its first attempt, and in the following years Trautmann established himself as one of the best keepers in the league, playing in all but five of his club's next 250 league matches. By 1952, his fame had spread to his home country, leading Schalke 04 to offer Manchester City £1,000 (equivalent to £25,100 in 2025) for his services. The offer was refused; the club responded that they thought Trautmann to be worth twenty times more.

In the mid-1950s, the Manchester City manager Les McDowall introduced a new tactical system using a deep-lying centre-forward, which became known as the Revie Plan after Don Revie, who played centre-forward. The system depended on maintaining possession of the ball wherever possible, which required Trautmann to make use of his throwing ability. For goalkeepers of Trautmann's era, it was usual to kick the ball as far as possible downfield after making a save. By contrast, Trautmann, influenced by the Hungarian goalkeeper Gyula Grosics, sought to start attacks by throwing the ball to a wing-half, typically Ken Barnes or John McTavish. The wing-half then passed to Revie to develop the attack.

==== 1955 and 1956 FA Cup finals ====
Wembley Stadium, the venue for the 1955 and 1956 FA Cup finals

Using the Revie Plan, Manchester City reached the 1955 FA Cup final, in which Trautmann became the first German to play in an FA Cup final. City faced Newcastle United, winners of the cup in 1951 and 1952. Nerves affected the City players, and they went behind to a Jackie Milburn goal after only 45 seconds. Further problems were caused by the loss of Jimmy Meadows to injury after 18 minutes, leaving City with 10 men, a disadvantage that meant Trautmann's ability to start attacks from throws was limited. Though Bobby Johnstone equalised in the first half, they struggled in the second, and after 57 minutes Trautmann was outwitted by Bobby Mitchell, who scored Newcastle's second goal. The match finished as a 3–1 defeat for City, giving Trautmann a runners-up medal.

Manchester City had a strong season in 1955–56, finishing fourth in the league and reached the FA Cup final against Birmingham City. Trautmann, one of the team's most prominent performers, won the FWA Footballer of the Year Award shortly before the match, the first goalkeeper to win the award. Two days later, Trautmann stepped out onto the Wembley pitch for the match that would gain him worldwide acclaim.

During the previous final, nerves had contributed to the opposition scoring an early goal, but the City team was more settled on this occasion. Under the influence of Don Revie who was outstanding on the day, City scored an early goal, a left-footed strike by Joe Hayes. Birmingham equalised on 14 minutes. The match remained level until midway through the second half, when Jack Dyson and Bobby Johnstone scored two goals in as many minutes to give Manchester City a 3–1 lead. Birmingham attacked strongly in the next ten minutes. In the 75th minute, Trautmann, diving at an incoming ball, was knocked out in a collision with Birmingham's Peter Murphy in which he was hit in the neck by Murphy's right knee. No substitutes were permitted in those days, so Trautmann, dazed and unsteady on his feet, carried on. For the remaining 15 minutes he defended his net, making a crucial interception to deny Murphy once more. Manchester City held on for the victory, and Trautmann was the hero because of his spectacular saves in the last minutes of the match. Trautmann admitted later that he had spent the last part of the match "in a kind of fog".

His neck continued to cause him pain, and Prince Philip commented on its crooked state as he gave Trautmann his winner's medal. Trautmann attended that evening's post-match banquet despite being unable to move his head, and went to bed expecting the injury to heal with rest. As the pain did not recede, the following day he went to St George's Hospital, where he was told he merely had a crick in his neck which would go away. Three days later, he got a second opinion from a doctor at Manchester Royal Infirmary. An X-ray revealed he had dislocated five vertebrae, the second of which was cracked in two. The third vertebra had wedged against the second, preventing further damage which could have cost Trautmann his life.

==== Recovery from injury ====
Trautmann's convalescence took several months, resulting in him missing a large part of the 1956–57 season. Jack Savage deputised during his absence. At the start of December, Trautmann played two reserve matches, but lacked confidence. He was restored to the first team on 15 December for a match against Wolverhampton Wanderers, but conceded three goals. He struggled to regain his form in the remainder of the season, leading to calls from some fans and media for him to retire. Others criticised the club, believing that Trautmann had been forced to play while still not fully recovered from injury.

The 1957–58 season was an unusual one for Manchester City, who became the only English team to both score and concede 100 goals in a season. Trautmann played in 34 matches, and though he did not play in the 9–2 defeat to West Bromwich Albion, an 8–4 defeat to Leicester City was a record for the most goals conceded by Trautmann in a match in his career, and in the entire season he kept only two clean sheets.

==== Testimonial ====
Trautmann appeared in 545 matches for City during the 15-year period between 1949 and 1964.

On 15 April 1964, he ended his career with a testimonial in front of a crowd officially numbered at 47,000, though the true figure was estimated to be closer to 60,000. Trautmann captained a combined Manchester City and Manchester United XI that included Bobby Charlton and Denis Law, against an International XI that included Tom Finney, Stanley Matthews and Jimmy Armfield.

=== Later career ===
After leaving City, Trautmann played for Wellington Town, who offered him £50 per match, signing in September 1964 to replace an injured regular keeper. Age had diminished his abilities, but his debut at Hereford United showed he still had the ability to draw crowds. However, he was sent off at Tonbridge for violent conduct in his second match and, in all, ended on the losing side in five of the seven matches he played for Wellington.

== International career ==
Though recognised as one of the leading goalkeepers of his era, Trautmann never played for his native country. Trautmann met with the German national coach, Sepp Herberger, in 1953, who explained that travel and political implications prevented him from selecting a player who was not readily available, and that he could only consider including Trautmann if he were playing in a German league. Consequently, Trautmann's international isolation prevented him from playing in the 1954 World Cup, in which his countrymen were victorious. Trautmann's only experience of international football came in 1960, when the Football League decided to include non-English players in the Football League representative team for the first time. Trautmann captained the League against the Irish League, and also played against the Italian League.

== Coaching career ==
After a couple of months pondering his future career plans, Trautmann received a telephone call from the Stockport County chairman, Victor Bernard, who offered him the position of general manager. Stockport was a struggling lower league club with a small budget, and Trautmann's appointment was an attempt to improve its image. Many people in the local area supported one of the two Manchester clubs, so to stimulate interest Trautmann and Bernard decided to move matches to Friday evenings, when neither Manchester club would be playing. This improved revenue, but the team continued to struggle. Trautmann resigned in 1966 following a disagreement with Bernard. From 1967 to 1968, he was the manager of the German team Preußen Münster, taking them to a 13th-place finish in the Regionalliga West, following which he had a short spell at Opel Rüsselsheim.

The German Football Association then sent Trautmann as a development worker to countries without national football structures. His first posting was in Burma, where he spent two years as the national coach, qualifying for the 1972 Olympics, and winning the President's Cup, a tournament contested by Southeast Asian countries, later that year. His work subsequently took him to advisory coaching roles for the national teams of Tanzania, Liberia, Pakistan and North Yemen, where he trained several coaches and helped them obtain the coaching license. Following his retirement, Trautmann settled in Spain.

== Style of play ==
Trautmann excelled at shot-stopping, particularly penalties, saving 60% of those he faced over the course of his career. The Manchester United manager Matt Busby mentioned Trautmann's anticipation in his pre-match team talks: "Don't stop to think where you're going to hit it with Trautmann. Hit it first and think afterwards. If you look up and work it out he will read your thoughts and stop it." Similar sentiments were expressed by the Manchester City forward Neil Young, who recalled that "the only way to beat him with a shot in training was to mis-hit it". As a former handball player, Trautmann was adept at throwing the ball long distances, an attribute he used to start attacking moves, particularly after witnessing the Hungarian goalkeeper Gyula Grosics use such tactics to good effect in Hungary's 6–3 victory over England in 1953.

Trautmann found it difficult to accept criticism, and allowed only close friends to suggest changes to his game. He occasionally dwelt on mistakes to the detriment of his concentration, a tendency his friend Stan Wilson called "picking at daisies". A short temper also caused occasional problems; he was sent off on more than one occasion.

== Legacy and influence ==
There have only been two world-class goalkeepers. One was Lev Yashin, the other was the German boy who played in Manchester – Trautmann.

— Lev Yashin

Over the course of his career, Trautmann received many plaudits from leading football figures. The Russian goalkeeper Lev Yashin, himself considered one of the greatest goalkeepers of all time, believed that Trautmann and himself were the "only ... two world-class goalkeepers".

Trautmann's idiosyncratic style of play also had an influence on budding young goalkeepers at the height of his career. The former Arsenal goalkeeper Bob Wilson named Trautmann as his boyhood hero, and Gordon Banks cited him as an influence on his playing style.

Media outlets have since recognised Trautmann's reputation. ESPN consider Trautmann as one of the greatest FA Cup goalkeepers, with Trautmann representing Manchester City in two consecutive FA Cup finals in 1955 and 1956 while his lunge at Peter Murphy's feet to grasp the ball in the 1956 FA Cup final is rated as the greatest FA Cup save; a save that broke Trautmann's neck.

In November 1995, Trautmann returned to Maine Road to open the rebuilt Kippax Stand. However, the stand was gone within a decade: in May 2003 the club moved to the City of Manchester Stadium, Maine Road was closed and was demolished the following year.

Trautmann was portrayed by German actor David Kross in the 2018 biopic The Keeper.

== Awards ==
In 1997, Trautmann received the Order of Merit of the Federal Republic of Germany. He was appointed an honorary OBE in 2004 for his work in Anglo-German relations, and received the award at the British Embassy in Berlin. The following night, at a concert given by the Berlin Philharmonic Orchestra, he met the Queen. "Ah, Herr Trautmann. I remember you", she said. "Have you still got that pain in your neck?"

In 2005, he was inducted into the National Football Museum's Hall of Fame. He continued to follow Manchester City and visited Manchester to watch them play, with his last visit in April 2010. In 1999, he had also appeared in the BBC Timewatch programme episode "The Germans We Kept", recounting the experiences of German prisoners of war who decided to remain in the UK.

== Personal life ==
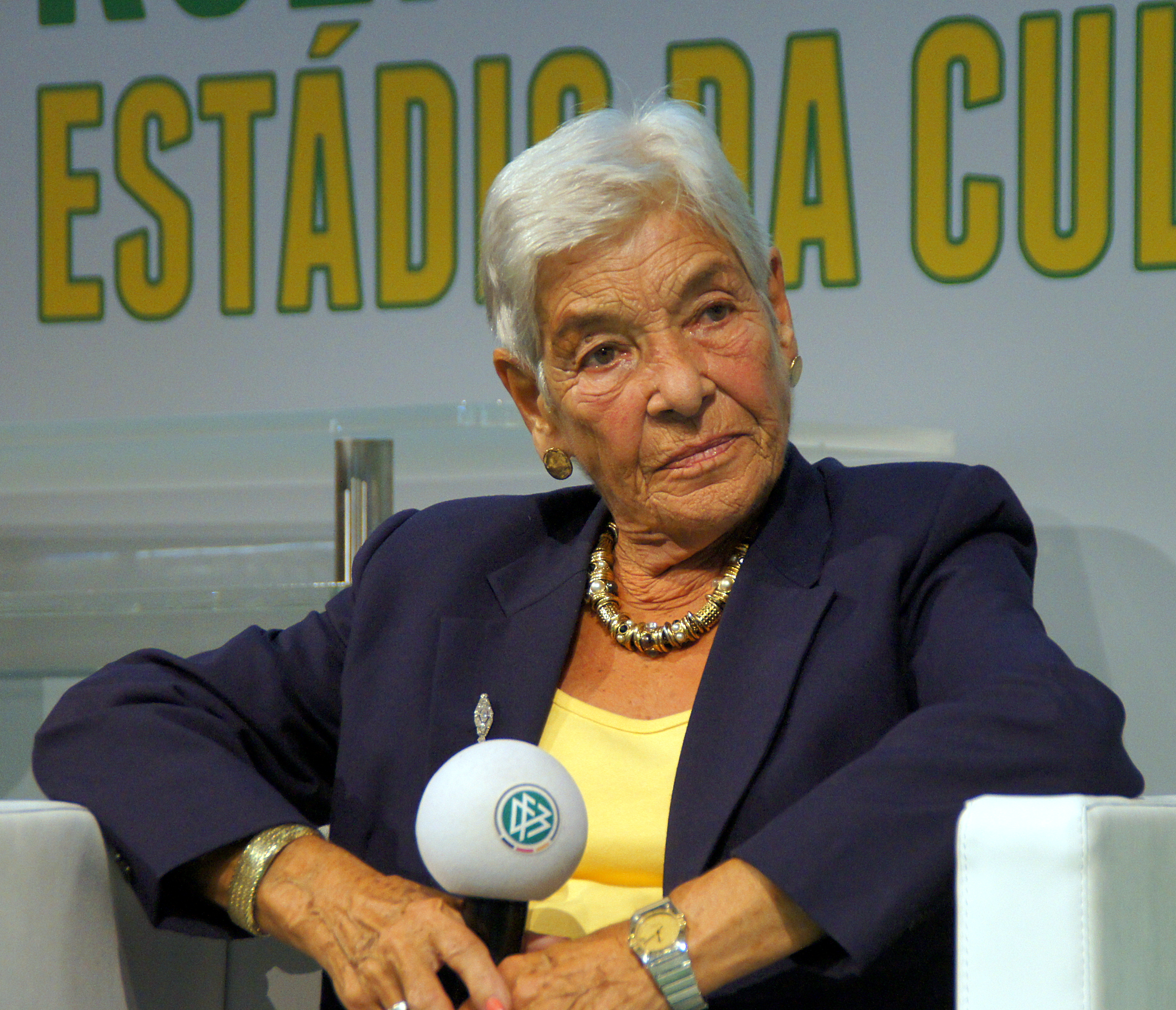
Trautmann's third wife Marlis during the introduction of the German translation of the biography Trautmann's Journey: From Hitler Youth to FA Cup Legend by Catrine Clay at Frankfurt Book Fair, 12 October 2013.

Trautmann married a St Helens woman, Margaret Friar, in 1950, but they divorced in 1972. The couple had three children. John, his firstborn son, was killed in a car accident a few months after the FA Cup final in 1956, aged five. According to Trautmann, his wife's struggle to come to terms with the loss ultimately resulted in the breakup of their marriage. He also had a daughter from a previous relationship, from whom he was estranged for many years. He reunited with his daughter in 1990, and with her mother, Marion Greenhall, in 2001. He married Ursula von der Heyde, a German national, while living in Burma in the 1970s, but divorced in 1982. From 1990, Trautmann lived with his third wife Marlis in a small bungalow on the Spanish coast near Valencia. He later helped found the Trautmann Foundation, which continues his legacy by fostering courage and sportsmanship.

Trautmann's autobiography Steppes to Wembley was published in 1956.

=== Death ===
Trautmann died at home in Spain on 19 July 2013 at the age of 89. He had suffered two heart attacks earlier in the year. The president of the German Football Association, Wolfgang Niersbach, said that Trautmann was "an amazing sportsman and a true gentleman ... a legend". Bob Wilson, a former Arsenal goalkeeper, tweeted, "Amazing man who helped bring our warring countries closer together". Joe Corrigan, a former Manchester City goalkeeper, said Trautmann was "a fantastic man and was one of the greatest goalkeepers of all time".

== Career statistics ==
Appearances and goals by club, season and competition
Club	Season	League			FA Cup		League Cup		Total	
Club	Season	Division	Apps	Goals	Apps	Goals	Apps	Goals	Apps	Goals
St Helens Town	1948–49	Liverpool Combination	34	0	1	0	—		35	0
St Helens Town	1949–50	Lancashire Combination	9	0	1	0	—		10	0
St Helens Town	Total		43	0	2	0	—		45	0
Manchester City	1949–50	First Division	26	0	0	0	—		26	0
Manchester City	1950–51	Second Division	42	0	1	0	—		43	0
Manchester City	1951–52	First Division	41	0	2	0	—		43	0
Manchester City	1952–53	First Division	42	0	3	0	—		45	0
Manchester City	1953–54	First Division	42	0	2	0	—		44	0
Manchester City	1954–55	First Division	40	0	6	0	—		46	0
Manchester City	1955–56	First Division	40	0	7	0	—		47	0
Manchester City	1956–57	First Division	21	0	2	0	—		23	0
Manchester City	1957–58	First Division	34	0	1	0	—		35	0
Manchester City	1958–59	First Division	41	0	2	0	—		43	0
Manchester City	1959–60	First Division	41	0	1	0	—		42	0
Manchester City	1960–61	First Division	40	0	4	0	2	0	46	0
Manchester City	1961–62	First Division	40	0	2	0	1	0	43	0
Manchester City	1962–63	First Division	15	0	0	0	1	0	16	0
Manchester City	1963–64	Second Division	3	0	0	0	0	0	3	0
Manchester City	Total		508	0	33	0	4	0	545	0
Wellington Town	1964–65	Southern League	7	0	0	0	—		7	0
Career total			558	0	35	0	4	0	597	0

Sources: Rowlands, Trautmann: The Biography, p. 252; James, Manchester City: The Complete Record, pp. 367–395.

== Honours ==
Manchester City

- FA Cup: 1955–56; runner-up: 1954–55

Individual

- Iron Cross First Class: 1942
- FWA Footballer of the Year: 1956
- Order of Merit of the Federal Republic of Germany: 1997
- Order of the British Empire: 2004
- English Football Hall of Fame: 2005
- Germany's Sports Hall of Fame: 2011
