= Billy Spurdle =

Footballer (1926–2011)

Personal information
- Full name: William Spurdle
- Date of birth: 28 January 1926
- Place of birth: Saint Peter Port, Guernsey, Channel Islands
- Date of death: 20 June 2011 (aged 85)
- Place of death: Guernsey, Channel Islands
- Positions: Wing half; winger

Senior career*
Years	Team	Apps	(Gls)
1948–1950	Oldham Athletic	56	(5)
1950–1956	Manchester City	160	(32)
1956–1957	Port Vale	21	(7)
1957–1963	Oldham Athletic	144	(19)
Total		381	(63)
- * Club domestic league appearances and goals

William Spurdle (28 January 1926 – 20 June 2011) was a Guernsey-born footballer who played as a wing half. He scored 63 goals in 381 league appearances in a 16-year professional career in the Football League.

He started his career with Oldham Athletic in 1947 before making a £12,000 move to Manchester City two years later. He helped the club to win promotion out of the Second Division in the 1950–51 campaign. He went on to feature in the 1955 FA Cup final defeat to Newcastle United. He was sold to Port Vale in November 1956 for a £4,000 fee before returning to Oldham at the end of the season for a £1,000 fee. He helped the "Latics" to win promotion out of the Fourth Division in 1962–63, his final season as a professional player.

== Career ==
Spurdle began his career at Oldham Athletic in March 1948, having moved to Oldham from his native Guernsey during World War II to escape Nazi Germany's occupation of the Channel Islands. He served in the Royal Navy during the war. He scored five goals in 56 Third Division North appearances as Billy Wootton's "Latics" posted 11th and sixth-place finishes in the 1947–48 and 1948–49 campaigns.

Spurdle then joined Jock Thomson's Manchester City for a £12,000 fee in January 1950 but could not prevent the club from suffering relegation out of the First Division in 1949–50. Les McDowall was then put in charge at Maine Road, and led the club to an immediate promotion with a second-place finish in the Second Division in 1950–51. After Spurdle helped the "Citizens" to a 15th-place finish in 1951–52, he finished as the club's joint top-scorer (with Johnny Williamson) in the 1952–53 season with 12 goals. City struggled in the lower half of the table in the 1953–54 campaign, before exploiting the "Revie plan" to push on to a seventh-place finish in 1954–55. They also improved their FA Cup form and reached the 1955 FA Cup final at Wembley, where they were beaten 3–1 by Newcastle United; Spurdle was forced to spend most of the game playing at right-back after an injury to Jimmy Meadows left them with only ten players. The "Sky Blues" improved further in the 1955–56 season, finishing fourth and reaching the FA Cup final for a second consecutive year. Spurdle was unable to play in the 1956 FA Cup final due to a severe outbreak of boils on his arm; Revie took his number 7 shirt and helped City to beat Birmingham City 3–1 in his absence.

"In 1955, I didn’t play in any of the rounds but played in the final – 12 months later, I played in all the rounds but missed the final."

— Spurdle remained philosophical after missing an FA Cup winner's medal.

He was bought by Second Division Port Vale in November 1956 for a £4,000 fee. He scored on his debut in a 3–2 win over Bury at Vale Park, and two weeks later he scored a brace in a 4–2 win over Doncaster Rovers. This temporarily took them away from relegation worries before a streak of seven games without victory. He finished the 1956–57 season with seven goals in 23 games. However, this was not enough to turn around Vale's season or to save manager Freddie Steele's job, as the "Valiants" were relegated with Norman Low at the helm.

In the summer of 1957, Spurdle was sold back to Oldham Athletic for £1,000, who were still competing in the Third Division North. They finished 15th in 1957–58, one point below the Third Division threshold, and as a result Ted Goodier was replaced as manager by Norman Dodgin. Oldham declined further and finished 21st in 1958–59, the inaugural season of the Fourth Division, and were forced to apply for re-election. A 23rd-place finish in 1959–60 again meant that they had to convince their peers to keep them in the Football League. Under the stewardship of new boss Jack Rowley, they rose to 12th place in 1960–61, before posting an 11th-place finish in 1961–62. In Spurdle's final season at Boundary Park, 1962–63, Oldham won promotion as the division's runners-up. He remained at the club as a coach, before he returned to the Channel Islands in 1967. He turned down the chance to become the club's manager.

== Post-retirement ==
After entering the business world in Oldham, Spurdle took his family back to his native Guernsey to start up a tomato-growing business. He remained active in football, coaching the local island team. He died in June 2011, aged 85, leaving behind two sons, John and Roger, and a daughter, Kay.

== Career statistics ==
Appearances and goals by club, season and competition
Club	Season	League			FA Cup		League Cup		Total	
Club	Season	Division	Apps	Goals	Apps	Goals	Apps	Goals	Apps	Goals
Oldham Athletic	1947–48	Third Division North	1	0	0	0	—		1	0
Oldham Athletic	1948–49	Third Division North	35	2	3	0	—		38	2
Oldham Athletic	1949–50	Third Division North	20	3	5	3	—		25	6
Oldham Athletic	Total		56	5	8	3	0	0	64	8
Manchester City	1949–50	First Division	13	0	0	0	—		13	0
Manchester City	1950–51	Second Division	31	4	1	0	—		32	4
Manchester City	1951–52	First Division	9	0	2	0	—		11	0
Manchester City	1952–53	First Division	27	11	2	1	—		29	12
Manchester City	1953–54	First Division	24	2	0	0	—		24	2
Manchester City	1954–55	First Division	16	6	1	0	—		17	6
Manchester City	1955–56	First Division	35	9	6	0	—		41	6
Manchester City	1956–57	First Division	5	0	0	0	—		5	0
Manchester City	Total		160	32	12	1	0	0	172	33
Port Vale	1956–57	Second Division	21	7	2	0	—		23	7
Oldham Athletic	1957–58	Third Division North	35	13	1	0	—		36	13
Oldham Athletic	1958–59	Fourth Division	26	1	1	0	—		27	1
Oldham Athletic	1959–60	Fourth Division	36	3	3	1	—		39	4
Oldham Athletic	1960–61	Fourth Division	28	1	2	0	2	0	32	1
Oldham Athletic	1961–62	Fourth Division	15	1	3	0	2	0	20	1
Oldham Athletic	1962–63	Fourth Division	4	0	0	0	0	0	4	0
Oldham Athletic	Total		144	19	10	1	4	0	158	20
Career total			381	63	32	5	4	0	417	68

== Honours ==
Manchester City

- Football League Second Division second-place promotion: 1950–51
- FA Cup runner-up: 1954–55

Oldham Athletic

- Football League Fourth Division second-place promotion: 1962–63
