= 1954–55 Manchester City F.C. season =

English football club season

Manchester City
1954–55 season
- Manager: Les McDowall
- Stadium: Maine Road
- First Division: 7th
- FA Cup: Runners-up
- Top goalscorer: League: Johnny Hart (14); All: Joe Hayes and Johnny Hart (15)
- Highest home attendance: 74,723 vs Manchester United; 29 January 1955
- Lowest home attendance: 13,648 vs Leicester City; 15 January 1955

The 1954–55 season was Manchester City's 53rd season of competitive football and 38th season in the top division of English football. In addition to the First Division, the club competed in the FA Cup.

== First Division ==
=== League table ===
Pos	Team	Pld	W	D	L	GF	GA	GAv	Pts
5	Manchester United	42	20	7	15	84	74	1.135	47
6	Aston Villa	42	20	7	15	72	73	0.986	47
7	Manchester City	42	18	10	14	76	69	1.101	46
8	Newcastle United	42	17	9	16	89	77	1.156	43
9	Arsenal	42	17	9	16	69	63	1.095	43

Source: World Football
Rules for classification: 1) Points; 2) Goal average; 3) Goals scored

=== Results summary ===
Overall								Home						Away					
Pld	W	D	L	GF	GA	GAv	Pts	W	D	L	GF	GA	Pts	W	D	L	GF	GA	Pts
42	18	10	14	76	69	1.101	46	11	5	5	45	36	27	7	5	9	31	33	19

=== Reports ===
Date	Opponents	H / A	Venue	Result F – A	Scorers	Attendance
21 August 1954	Preston North End	A	Deepdale	0 – 5		35,000
25 August 1954	Sheffield United	H	Maine Road	5 – 2	Revie (2), Hart (2), Clarke	23,856
28 August 1954	Burnley	H	Maine Road	0 – 0		25,000
30 August 1954	Sheffield United	A	Bramhall Lane	2 – 0	Revie, Hart	25,000
4 September 1954	Leicester City	A	Filbert Street	2 - 0	McAdams, Hart	32,825
8 September 1954	Arsenal	H	Maine Road	2 – 1	Hart, (og)	38,146
11 September 1954	Chelsea	H	Maine Road	1 – 1	Paul	35,971
14 September 1954	Arsenal	A	Highbury	3 – 2	McAdams, Hart, Clarke	33,898
18 September 1954	Cardiff City	A	Ninian Park	0 – 3		30,000
25 September 1954	Manchester United	H	Maine Road	3 – 2	McAdams, Fagan, Hart	54,105
2 October 1954	Everton	H	Maine Road	1 - 0	Clarke	45,737
9 October 1954	Wolverhampton Wanderers	A	Molineux Stadium	2 – 2	Fagan (2)	41,601
16 October 1954	Aston Villa	H	Maine Road	2 – 4	Spurdle (2)	36,384
23 October 1954	Bolton Wanderers	A	Burnden Park	2 – 2	McAdams, Revie	30,123
30 October 1954	Huddersfield Town	H	Maine Road	2 – 4	Revie (2)	34,246
6 November 1954	Sheffield Wednesday	A	Hillsborough Stadium	4 – 2	Williamson (2), Hart, Clarke	19,152
13 November 1954	Portsmouth	H	Maine Road	1 – 2	Fagan	24,564
20 November 1954	Blackpool	A	Bloomfield Road	3 – 1	McAdams (2), Williamson	21,734
27 November 1954	Charlton Athletic	H	Maine Road	1 – 5	Davies	25,799
4 December 1954	Sunderland	A	Roker Park	2 – 3	Hart (2)	33,733
11 December 1954	Tottenham Hotspur	H	Maine Road	0 – 0		27,052
18 December 1954	Preston North End	H	Maine Road	3 – 1	Hart (2), Hayes	26,615
25 December 1954	Newcastle United	H	Maine Road	3 – 1	Hayes, Spurdle (2)	26,664
27 December 1954	Newcastle United	A	St James’ Park	0 – 2		52,850
1 January 1955	Burnley	A	Turf Moor	0 – 2		25,931
15 January 1955	Leicester City	H	Maine Road	2 – 2	Hayes, Clarke	13,648
22 January 1955	Chelsea	A	Stamford Bridge	2 – 0	Hayes, Clark	34,160
5 February 1955	Cardiff City	H	Maine Road	4 – 1	Fagan, Hayes, Revie, Clarke	31,922
12 February 1955	Manchester United	A	Old Trafford	5 - 0	Fagan (2), Hayes (2), Hart	47,914
23 February 1955	Everton	A	Goodison Park	0 – 1		20,457
5 March 1955	Tottenham Hotspur	A	White Hart Lane	2 – 2	Hart, Hayes	35,358
16 March 1955	Bolton Wanderers	H	Maine Road	4 – 2	Hayes (3), Fagan	27,413
19 March 1955	Huddersfield Town	A	Leeds Road	0 – 0		31,065
30 March 1955	Sheffield Wednesday	H	Maine Road	2 – 2	Hayes, Davies	14,825
2 April 1955	Portsmouth	A	Fratton Park	0 – 1		24,286
8 April 1955	West Bromwich Albion	H	Maine Road	4 – 0	Johnstone, Spurdle, Hayes, Fagan	57,663
9 April 1955	Sunderland	H	Maine Road	1 – 0	Revie	60,611
11 April 1955	West Bromwich Albion	A	The Hawthorns	1 – 2	Spurdle	30,000
16 April 1955	Charlton Athletic	A	The Valley	1 – 1	Johnstone	25,064
20 April 1955	Wolverhampton Wanderers	H	Maine Road	3 – 0	Fagan, Meadows, Williamson	50,705
23 April 1955	Blackpool	H	Maine Road	1 – 6	Fagan	44,339
30 April 1955	Aston Villa	A	Villa Park	0 – 2		25,000

== FA Cup ==
=== Reports ===
Date	Round	Opponents	H / A	Venue	Result F – A	Scorers	Attendance
8 January 1955	Third round	Derby County	A	Baseball Ground	3 - 1	Hayes 10’, Revie 12’ (pen), Barnes 61’	23,409
29 January 1955	Fourth round	Manchester United	H	Maine Road	2 – 0	Hayes 60’, Revie 88’	74,723
19 February 1955	Fifth round	Luton Town	A	Kenilworth Road	2 – 0	Clarke (2)	23,104
12 March 1955	Sixth round	Birmingham City	A	St Andrews	1 - 0	Hart	58,000
26 March 1955	Semi Final	Sunderland	N	Villa Park	1 – 0	Clarke 57’	58,498

=== Final ===
7 May 1955; 15:00 BST	Newcastle United	3–1	Manchester City	Wembley, London
	Milburn 1'; Mitchell 52'; Hannah 59'		Johnstone 45'	Attendance: 100,000; Referee: Reg Leafe

== Awards ==
=== FWA Footballer of the Year ===
Player
(England) Don Revie
