= Eric Westwood =

English footballer

Personal information
- Date of birth: 25 September 1917
- Place of birth: Manchester, England
- Date of death: 21 July 2001 (aged 83)
- Place of death: Manchester, England
- Position: Left back

Youth career
- 1935–1937: Manchester United
- 1937–1938: Manchester City

Senior career*
Years	Team	Apps	(Gls)
1938–1953	Manchester City	248	(3)
1944	→ Chelsea (war guest)	?	(?)
1953–1955	Altrincham	44	(10)
Total		292	(13)
- * Club domestic league appearances and goals

Eric Westwood (25 September 1917 – 21 July 2001) was an English professional footballer who played as a left back.

== Career ==
Born in Manchester, Westwood began his career as an amateur at Manchester United, but turned professional with city rivals Manchester City in 1938, making 248 appearances in the Football League for them over the next 15 seasons. During World War II, while serving with the British Army, Westwood guested for Chelsea, and played for them in the 1944 War Cup Final. Westwood's active wartime service with 1st Battalion, Manchester Regiment saw him serve as a Sergeant the in North West European campaign, landing in Normandy three weeks after D-Day.

As Manchester City's captain postwar he accepted, despite privately expressed doubts, the then publicly controversial signing in 1949 of former German prisoner of war Bert Trautmann as goalkeeper, making a public display of welcoming Trautmann by announcing, "There's no war in this dressing room".

After leaving Manchester City in May 1953, Westwood played two seasons of non-league football with Altrincham.
