= 1955–56 Manchester City F.C. season =

English football club season

Manchester City
1955–56 season
- Manager: Les McDowall
- Stadium: Maine Road
- First Division: 4th
- FA Cup: Winners
- Top goalscorer: League: Joe Hayes (23); All: Joe Hayes (27)
- Highest home attendance: 76,129 vs Everton; 3 March 1956
- Lowest home attendance: 14,499 vs Luton Town; 10 December 1955

The 1955–56 season was Manchester City's 54th season of competitive football and 39th season in the top division of English football. In addition to the First Division, the club competed in the FA Cup.

== First Division ==
=== League table ===
Pos	Team	Pld	W	D	L	GF	GA	GAv	Pts
2	Blackpool	42	20	9	13	86	62	1.387	49
3	Wolverhampton Wanderers	42	20	9	13	89	65	1.369	49
4	Manchester City	42	18	10	14	82	69	1.188	46
5	Arsenal	42	18	10	14	60	61	0.984	46
6	Birmingham City	42	18	9	15	75	57	1.316	45

Source: World Football
Rules for classification: 1) Points; 2) Goal average; 3) Goals scored

=== Results summary ===
Overall								Home						Away					
Pld	W	D	L	GF	GA	GAv	Pts	W	D	L	GF	GA	Pts	W	D	L	GF	GA	Pts
42	18	10	14	82	69	1.188	46	11	5	5	40	27	27	7	5	9	42	42	19

=== Reports ===
Date	Opponents	H / A	Venue	Result F – A	Scorers	Attendance
22 August 1959	Nottingham Forest	H	Maine Road	2 – 1	Fagan, Johnstone	38,974
26 August 1959	Fulham	A	Craven Cottage	2 – 5	Barlow, Colbridge	27,000
29 August 1959	Sheffield Wednesday	A	Hillsborough Stadium	0 – 1		33,479
2 September 1959	Fulham	H	Maine Road	3 – 1	McAdams, Colbridge	37,485
6 September 1955	Arsenal	A	Highbury	0 - 0		30,864
10 September 1955	Cardiff City	H	Maine Road	3 – 1	Hayes (2), Johnstone	33,240
17 September 1955	Huddersfield Town	A	Leeds Road	3 – 3	Fagan, Johnstone, Clarke	20,443
24 September 1955	Blackpool	H	Maine Road	2 – 0	Revie, Johnstone	63,925
1 October 1955	Chelsea	A	Stamford Bridge	1 – 2	Marsden	44,538
8 October 1955	Sheffield United	A	Bramhall Lane	1 – 1	Dyson	24,000
15 October 1955	Preston North End	H	Maine Road	0 - 2		33,187
22 October 1955	Birmingham City	A	St Andrews	3 – 4	Hayes, Dyson, Faulkner	28,500
29 October 1955	West Bromwich Albion	H	Maine Road	2 – 0		35,081
5 November 1955	Charlton Athletic	A	The Valley	2 – 5	Hayes, Cunliffe	24,655
12 November 1955	Tottenham Hotspur	H	Maine Road	1 – 2	Hayes	24,094
19 November 1955	Everton	A	Goodison Park	1 – 1	Faulkners	34,632
26 November 1955	Newcastle United	H	Maine Road	1 – 2	Faulkners	24,564
3 December 1955	Burnley	A	Turf Moor	2 – 2	Hayes, Dyson	26,227
10 December 1955	Luton Town	H	Maine Road	3 – 2	Clarke, Hayes, Spurdle	14,499
17 December 1955	Aston Villa	A	Villa Park	3 – 0	Dyson (2), Spurdle	20,000
24 December 1955	Wolverhampton Wanderers	H	Maine Road	2 – 2	Spurdle, Hayes	32,935
26 December 1955	Bolton Wanderers	A	Burnden Park	3 – 1	Spurdle, Dyson, (og)	43,706
27 December 1955	Bolton Wanderers	H	Maine Road	2 – 0	Paul, Clarke	38,405
31 December 1955	Manchester United	A	Old Trafford	1 – 2	Dyson	60,956
2 January 1956	Portsmouth	H	Maine Road	4 – 1	Johnstone (3), Hayes	43,133
14 January 1956	Cardiff City	A	Ninian Park	1 – 4	Johnstone	27,000
21 January 1956	Huddersfield Town	H	Maine Road	1 – 0	Spurdle	21,076
4 February 1956	Blackpool	A	Bloomfield Road	1 – 0	Faulkner	17,014
11 February 1956	Chelsea	H	Maine Road	2 - 2	Hayes (2)	26,642
25 February 1956	Preston North End	A	Deepdale	3 – 0	Johnstone (2), Hayes	22,664
7 March 1956	Everton	H	Maine Road	3 – 0	Spurdle, Johnstone, Clarke	15,227
10 March 1956	West Bromwich Albion	A	The Hawthorns	4 – 0	Johnstone (2), Hayes, Dyson	32,000
21 March 1956	Charlton Athletic	H	Maine Road	0 – 2		13,998
24 March 1956	Tottenham Hotspur	A	White Hart Lane	1 – 2	Hayes	31,662
30 March 1956	Sunderland	A	Roker Park	3 – 0	Hayes, Revie, (og)	40,394
31 March 1956	Birmingham City	H	Maine Road	1 – 1	Hayes	44,777
2 April 1956	Sunderland	H	Maine Road	4 – 2	Hayes (2), Dyson (2)	40,915
7 April 1956	Newcastle United	A	St James’ Park	1 – 3	Dyson	25,999
11 April 1956	Sheffield United	H	Maine Road	3 – 1	Spurdle, Hayes, Faulkner	16,991
14 April 1956	Burnley	H	Maine Road	1 – 3	Spurdle	29,087
21 April 1956	Luton Town	A	Kenilworth Road	2 – 3	Barnes, Clarke	18,189
28 April 1956	Portsmouth	A	Fratton Park	4 – 2	Hart, Spurdle	24,684

== FA Cup ==
=== Reports ===
Date	Round	Opponents	H / A	Venue	Result F – A	Scorers	Attendance
11 January 1956	Third round	Blackpool	H	Maine Road	2 - 1	Johnstone, Dyson	46,217
28 January 1956	Fourth round	Southend United	A	Maine Road	1 – 0	Hayes	29,500
18 February 1956	Fifth round	Liverpool	H	Maine Road	0 – 0		70,640
22 February 1956	Fifth round replay	Liverpool	A	Anfield	2 - 1	Hayes, Dyson	57,520

=== Sixth round ===
3 March 1956	Manchester City	2–1	Everton	Maine Road, Manchester
	Hayes; Johnstone		Harris	Attendance: 76,129

=== Semi-final ===
City played what was their eighth FA Cup Semi-final tie against Tottenham at Villa Park. When the two sides met in the league, Spurs were victorious with a 2-1 win in both games. However, Bobby Johnstone’s header before half time was enough to send City to their sixth final. But it didn’t come without a moment of controversy, when Spurs were denied a penalty after attacker George Robb was grabbed at the leg by Bert Trautmann towards the end of the game.

17 March 1956	Manchester City	1–0	Tottenham Hotspur	Villa Park, Birmingham
	Johnstone			Attendance: 69,788

=== Final ===
The final took place on Saturday, 5 May 1956 at Wembley and ended 3–1, with goals scored by Joe Hayes, Bobby Johnstone and Jack Dyson for Manchester City and Noel Kinsey for Birmingham City. The attendance was 100,000. The match is remembered for an incident where Manchester City goalkeeper Bert Trautmann sustained a neck injury diving at the feet of Birmingham attacker Peter Murphy; he completed the game in considerable pain, and later examination discovered he had broken a bone in his neck.

5 May 1956; 15:00 BST	Manchester City	3–1	Birmingham City	Wembley, London
	Hayes 3'; Johnstone 62'; Dyson 64'		Kinsey 15'	Attendance: 100,000; Referee: Alf Bond

== Awards ==
=== FWA Footballer of the Year ===
Player
(Germany) Bert Trautmann
