= Jack Boothway =

English footballer and manager

Personal information
- Full name: John Boothway
- Date of birth: 4 February 1919
- Place of birth: Manchester, England
- Date of death: 1979 (aged 59–60)
- Position: Striker

Senior career*
Years	Team	Apps	(Gls)
1941–1944	Manchester City	0	(0)
1944–1946	Crewe Alexandra	12	(5)
1946–1950	Wrexham	95	(55)
	Mossley	?	(?)

Managerial career
- 1951–1955: Mossley
- 1955–1957: Northwich Victoria
- 1961–1971: Runcorn Linnets
- * Club domestic league appearances and goals

John Boothway (4 February 1919 – 1979) was an English footballer.

He played for Manchester City, Crewe Alexandra, Wrexham and Mossley. He became manager at Mossley before taking over at Northwich Victoria in 1955, where he stayed until 1957, which was followed by a spell with Runcorn Linnets from 1961 to 1971.
