= James Currier =

English footballer

Personal information
- Place of birth: Birmingham, England
- Place of death: Manchester, England
- Position: Centre forward

Senior career*
Years	Team	Apps	(Gls)
1934–1935	Cheltenham Town	?	(?)
1935–1939	Bolton Wanderers	26	(14)
1940–1943	Manchester City	75	(69)
Total		101	(83)
- * Club domestic league appearances and goals

James "Jim" Currier was an English-born footballer who played as a centre forward in the 1930s and 1940s.

He joined Bolton Wanderers from Cheltenham Town and first played in The Football League for Bolton in 1935–36, scoring 14 times in his 26 appearances.

During World War II he played for Manchester City on a number of occasions between 1940 and 1943. He scored 94 goals in his 113 games for City.
