= 1956–57 Manchester City F.C. season =

English football club season

Manchester City
1956–57 season
- Manager: Les McDowall
- Stadium: Maine Road
- First Division: 18th
- FA Cup: Third Round
- FA Charity Shield: Runners-up
- Top goalscorer: League: Joe Hayes and Bobby Johnstone (15); All: Bobby Johnstone (17)
- Highest home attendance: 63,872 vs Manchester United; 2 February 1957
- Lowest home attendance: 19,731 vs Bolton Wanderers; 25 December 1956

The 1956–57 season was Manchester City's 55th season of competitive football and 40th season in the top division of English football. In addition to the First Division, the club competed in the FA Cup and the FA Charity Shield.

== First Division ==
=== League table ===
Pos	Team	Pld	W	D	L	GF	GA	GAv	Pts
16	Luton Town	42	14	9	19	58	76	0.763	37
17	Newcastle United	42	14	8	20	67	87	0.770	36
18	Manchester City	42	13	9	20	78	88	0.886	35
19	Portsmouth	42	10	13	19	62	92	0.674	33
20	Sunderland	42	12	8	22	67	88	0.761	32

Source: World Football
Rules for classification: 1) Points; 2) Goal average; 3) Goals scored

=== Results summary ===
Overall								Home						Away					
Pld	W	D	L	GF	GA	GAv	Pts	W	D	L	GF	GA	Pts	W	D	L	GF	GA	Pts
42	13	9	20	78	88	0.886	35	10	2	9	48	42	22	3	7	11	30	46	13

=== Reports ===
Date	Opponents	H / A	Venue	Result F – A	Scorers	Attendance
18 August 1956	Wolverhampton Wanderers	A	Molineux Stadium	1 – 5	Revie	43,407
22 August 1956	Tottenham Hotspur	H	Maine Road	2 – 2	Clarke (2)	32,718
25 August 1956	Aston Villa	H	Maine Road	1 – 1	Clarke	24,326
29 August 1956	Tottenham Hotspur	A	White Hart Lane	2 – 3	Johnstone, Paul	33,083
1 September 1956	Luton Town	A	Kenilworth Road	2 - 3	Hayes, McAdams	21,625
5 September 1956	Leeds United	H	Maine Road	1 – 0	McAdams	34,185
8 September 1956	Sunderland	H	Maine Road	3 – 1	McAdams, Revie, Hayes	35,753
12 September 1956	Leeds United	A	Elland Road	0 – 2		35,000
15 September 1956	Charlton Athletic	A	The Valley	0 – 1		18,533
22 September 1956	Manchester United	A	Old Trafford	0 – 2		53,515
29 September 1956	Blackpool	H	Maine Road	0 - 3		39,528
6 October 1956	Arsenal	A	Highbury	3 – 7	Clarke (2), Dyson	32,651
13 October 1956	Burnley	H	Maine Road	0 – 1		35,981
20 October 1956	Newcastle United	A	St James' Park	3 – 0	Fagan, Johnstone, Dyson	43,310
27 October 1956	Sheffield Wednesday	H	Maine Road	4 – 2	Fagan, Hayes (2), Johnstone	29,259
3 November 1956	Cardiff City	A	Ninian Park	1 – 1	Dyson	28,000
10 November 1956	Birmingham City	H	Maine Road	3 – 1	Johnstone (2), Hayes	21,005
17 November 1956	West Bromwich Albion	A	The Hawthorns	1 – 1	Dyson	25,780
24 November 1956	Portsmouth	H	Maine Road	5 – 1	Fagan, Hayes (2), Johnstone, Clarke	24,364
1 December 1956	Preston North End	A	Deepdale	1 – 3	(og)	25,433
8 December 1956	Chelsea	H	Maine Road	5 – 4	Johnstone (3), Hayes (2)	24,412
15 December 1956	Wolverhampton Wanderers	H	Maine Road	2 – 3	Johnstone (2)	30,329
25 December 1956	Bolton Wanderers	H	Maine Road	1 – 3	Fagan	19,731
26 December 1956	Bolton Wanderers	A	Burnden Park	0 – 1		20,865
29 December 1956	Luton Town	H	Maine Road	3 – 2	Dyson (2), Clarke	27,253
12 January 1957	Sunderland	A	Roker Park	1 – 1	Fagan	34,119
19 January 1957	Charlton Athletic	H	Maine Road	5 – 1	Dyson (3), Johnstone, Fagan	22,108
2 February 1957	Manchester United	H	Maine Road	2 – 4	Clarke, Hayes	63,872
4 February 1957	Aston Villa	A	Villa Park	2 - 2	McClelland, Hayes	11,000
9 February 1957	Blackpool	A	Bloomfield Road	1 – 4	Johnstone	21,105
23 February 1957	Sheffield Wednesday	A	Hillsborough Stadium	2 – 2	Hayes, Paul	11,271
2 March 1957	Newcastle United	H	Maine Road	1 – 2	Barnes	25,229
9 March 1957	Chelsea	A	Stamford Bridge	2 – 4	Fagan, Hayes	35,664
16 March 1957	Cardiff City	H	Maine Road	4 – 1	Johnstone (3), Dyson	26,395
20 March 1957	Arsenal	H	Maine Road	2 – 3	Barnes, Clarke	27,974
30 March 1957	West Bromwich Albion	H	Maine Road	2 – 1	Paul, Fagan	26,361
6 April 1957	Portsmouth	A	Fratton Park	1 – 0	Dyson	24,949
13 April 1957	Preston North End	H	Maine Road	0 – 2		31,305
19 April 1957	Everton	H	Maine Road	2 – 4	Fagan, Clarke	28,009
20 April 1957	Burnley	A	Turf Moor	3 – 0	Hayes, Dyson, Clarke	16,746
22 April 1957	Everton	A	Goodison Park	1 – 1	McAdams	28,887
27 April 1957	Birmingham City	A	St Andrews	3 - 3	Kirkman (2), (og)	23,700

== FA Cup ==
=== Reports ===
Date	Round	Opponents	H / A	Venue	Result F – A	Scorers	Attendance
9 January 1957	Third round	Newcastle United	H	Maine Road	4 - 5	Johnstone (2), Fagan, Stokoe (og)	46,988

== FA Charity Shield ==
24 October 1956

Manchester City	0–1	Manchester United
		Viollet 75'

Maine Road, Manchester
Attendance: 30,495
