= 1959–60 Manchester City F.C. season =

English football club season

Manchester City
1959–60 season
- Manager: Les McDowall
- Stadium: Maine Road
- First Division: 16th
- FA Cup: Third Round
- Top goalscorer: League: Billy McAdams (22); All: Billy McAdams (22)
- Highest home attendance: 65,981 vs Burnley; 2 May 1960
- Lowest home attendance: 19,715 vs Leeds United; 12 December 1959

The 1959–60 season was Manchester City's 58th season of competitive football and 43rd season in the top division of English football. In addition to the First Division, the club competed in the FA Cup.

== First Division ==
=== League table ===
Pos	Team	Pld	W	D	L	GF	GA	GAv	Pts
14	West Ham United	42	16	6	20	75	91	0.824	38
15	Everton	42	13	11	18	73	78	0.936	37
16	Manchester City	42	17	3	22	78	84	0.929	37
17	Blackburn Rovers	42	16	5	21	60	70	0.857	37
18	Chelsea	42	14	9	19	76	91	0.835	37

Source: World Football
Rules for classification: 1) Points; 2) Goal average; 3) Goals scored

=== Results summary ===
Overall								Home						Away					
Pld	W	D	L	GF	GA	GAv	Pts	W	D	L	GF	GA	Pts	W	D	L	GF	GA	Pts
42	17	3	22	78	84	0.929	37	11	2	8	47	34	24	6	1	14	31	50	13

=== Reports ===
Date	Opponents	H / A	Venue	Result F – A	Scorers	Attendance
22 August 1959	Nottingham Forest	H	Maine Road	2 – 1	Fagan, Johnstone	38,974
26 August 1959	Fulham	A	Craven Cottage	2 – 5	Barlow, Colbridge	27,000
29 August 1959	Sheffield Wednesday	A	Hillsborough Stadium	0 – 1		33,479
2 September 1959	Fulham	H	Maine Road	3 – 1	McAdams, Colbridge	37,485
5 September 1959	Wolverhampton Wanderers	H	Maine Road	4 - 6	McAdams (3), Barlow	43,650
9 September 1959	Luton Town	A	Kenilworth Road	2 – 1	Hayes, Hannah	13,122
12 September 1959	Arsenal	A	Highbury	1 – 3	McAdams	38,392
16 September 1959	Luton Town	H	Maine Road	1 – 2	Colbridge	29,309
19 September 1959	Manchester United	H	Maine Road	3 – 0	Hayes (2), Hannah	58,300
26 September 1959	Blackburn Rovers	H	Maine Road	2 – 1	McAdams, Hayes	41,687
3 October 1959	Blackpool	A	Bloomfield Road	3 - 1	Barlow, Hayes, Colbridge	33,226
10 October 1959	Preston North End	A	Deepdale	5 – 1	McAdams (3), Barlow, Cheetham	31,546
17 October 1959	Leicester City	H	Maine Road	3 – 2	McAdams (2), Hayes	33,896
24 October 1959	Burnley	A	Turf Moor	3 – 4	Hannah (2), Colbridge	28,653
31 October 1959	Tottenham Hotspur	H	Maine Road	1 – 2	Leivers (pen)	45,506
7 November 1959	West Ham United	A	Boleyn Ground	1 – 4	Hayes	25,243
14 November 1959	Chelsea	H	Maine Road	1 – 1	Dyson	24,364
21 November 1959	West Bromwich Albion	A	The Hawthorns	0 – 2		24,600
28 November 1959	Newcastle United	H	Maine Road	3 – 4	McAdams (3)	28,416
5 December 1959	Birmingham City	A	St Andrews	2 – 4	Hayes, Colbridge	18,661
12 December 1959	Leeds United	H	Maine Road	3 – 3	Barlow (2), McAdams	19,715
19 December 1959	Nottingham Forest	A	City Ground	2 – 1	Barlow, (og)	13,363
26 December 1959	Everton	A	Goodison Park	1 – 2	Barlow	30,580
29 December 1959	Everton	H	Maine Road	4 – 0	Hayes, McAdams, Fagan, Barlow	43,531
2 January 1960	Sheffield Wednesday	H	Maine Road	4 – 1	McAdams (2), Barlow, Hayes	44,167
16 January 1960	Wolverhampton Wanderers	A	Molineux Stadium	2 – 4	Barlow, Colbridge	27,864
23 January 1960	Arsenal	H	Maine Road	1 – 2	McAdams	28,441
6 February 1960	Manchester United	A	Old Trafford	0 – 0		59,450
13 February 1960	Blackburn Rovers	A	Ewood Park	1 - 2	Barlow	23,731
27 February 1960	Birmingham City	H	Maine Road	3 – 0	Hayes (2), Barlow	23,479
5 March 1960	Leicester City	A	Filbert Street	0 – 5		34,009
9 March 1960	Blackpool	H	Maine Road	2 – 3	Barlow, Haydock	19,653
19 March 1960	Leeds United	A	Elland Road	3 – 4	Gibson (og), Law, Barlow	32,545
30 March 1960	West Ham United	H	Maine Road	3 – 1	Barlow, Law, McAdams	29,572
2 April 1960	Chelsea	A	Stamford Bridge	0 – 3		36,044
9 April 1960	West Bromwich Albion	H	Maine Road	0 – 1		24,342
15 April 1960	Bolton Wanderers	H	Maine Road	1 – 0	Barlow	50,053
16 April 1960	Tottenham Hotspur	A	White Hart Lane	1 – 0	McAdams	49,767
18 April 1960	Bolton Wanderers	A	Burnden Park	1 – 3	Barlow	35,591
23 April 1960	Preston North End	H	Maine Road	2 – 1	Barlow, Colbridge	29,812
30 April 1960	Newcastle United	A	St James’ Park	1 – 0	Hayes	27,812
2 May 1960	Burnley	H	Maine Road	1 – 2	Colbridge	65,981

== FA Cup ==
=== Reports ===
Date	Round	Opponents	H / A	Venue	Result F – A	Scorers	Attendance
9 January 1960	Third round	Southampton	H	Maine Road	1 - 5	Barlow	42,064
