= 1958–59 Manchester City F.C. season =

English football club season

Manchester City
1958–59 season
- Manager: Les McDowall
- Stadium: Maine Road
- First Division: 20th
- FA Cup: Third Round
- Top goalscorer: League: Colin Barlow (17); All: Colin Barlow (18)
- Highest home attendance: 62,812 vs Manchester United; 27 September 1958
- Lowest home attendance: 16,405 vs Blackburn Rovers; 29 November 1958

The 1958–59 season was Manchester City's 57th season of competitive football and 42nd season in the top division of English football. In addition to the First Division, the club competed in the FA Cup.

== First Division ==
=== League table ===
Pos	Team	Pld	W	D	L	GF	GA	GAv	Pts	Qualification or relegation
18	Tottenham Hotspur	42	13	10	19	85	95	0.895	36	
19	Leicester City	42	11	10	21	67	98	0.684	32	
20	Manchester City	42	11	9	22	64	95	0.674	31	
21	Aston Villa (R)	42	11	8	23	58	87	0.667	30	Relegation to the Second Division
22	Portsmouth (R)	42	6	9	27	64	112	0.571	21	Relegation to the Second Division

Source: World Football
Rules for classification: 1) Points; 2) Goal average; 3) Goals scored
(R) Relegated

=== Results summary ===
Overall								Home						Away					
Pld	W	D	L	GF	GA	GAv	Pts	W	D	L	GF	GA	Pts	W	D	L	GF	GA	Pts
42	11	9	22	64	95	0.674	31	8	7	6	40	32	23	3	2	16	24	63	8

=== Reports ===
Date	Opponents	H / A	Venue	Result F – A	Scorers	Attendance
23 August 1958	Burnley	A	Turf Moor	4 – 3	Johnstone(2), Hayes(2)	31,371
27 August 1958	Bolton Wanderers	H	Maine Road	3 – 3	Barlow, K.Barnes, Sambrook	40,844
30 August 1958	Preston North End	H	Maine Road	1 – 1	McClelland	42,576
3 September 1958	Bolton Wanderers	A	Burnden Park	1 – 4	Hayes	39,727
6 September 1958	Leicester City	A	Filbert Street	1 - 3	McAdams	29,053
10 September 1958	Luton Town	H	Maine Road	1 – 1	Fagan	30,771
13 September 1958	Everton	H	Maine Road	1 – 3	Barlow	35,437
17 September 1958	Luton Town	A	Kenilworth Road	1 – 5	Johnstone	18,000
20 September 1958	Arsenal	A	Highbury	1 - 4	Sambrook	47,878
27 September 1958	Manchester United	H	Maine Road	1 – 1	Hayes	62,812
4 October 1958	Leeds United	H	Maine Road	2 - 1	Hayes, Barlow	31,989
11 October 1958	Wolverhampton Wanderers	A	Molineux Stadium	0 – 2		33,789
18 October 1958	Portsmouth	H	Maine Road	3 – 2	Cheetham, Hayes, Fagan	31,330
25 October 1958	Newcastle United	A	St James’ Park	1 – 4	Hannah	54,330
1 November 1958	Tottenham Hotspur	H	Maine Road	5 – 1	Barlow (3), Hayes, Hannah	36,601
8 November 1958	Nottingham Forest	A	City Ground	0 – 4		34,004
15 November 1958	Chelsea	H	Maine Road	5 – 1	Leivers, Hayes, Barlow, Sambrook, Fagan	19,778
22 November 1958	Blackpool	A	Bloomfield Road	0 – 0		19,200
29 November 1958	Blackburn Rovers	H	Maine Road	0 – 1		16,405
6 December 1958	Aston Villa	A	Villa Park	1 – 1	Kirkman	19,000
13 December 1958	West Ham United	H	Maine Road	3 – 1	Barlow (3)	22,250
20 December 1958	Burnley	H	Maine Road	1 – 4	Barnes	22,328
26 December 1958	Birmingham City	A	St Andrews	1 – 6	Barlow	24,263
27 December 1958	Birmingham City	H	Maine Road	4 – 1	Hayes (2), Barlow, Sambrook	29,276
3 January 1959	Preston North End	A	Deepdale	0 – 2		21,208
31 January 1959	Everton	A	Goodison Park	1 – 3	Barlow	43,360
7 February 1959	Arsenal	H	Maine Road	0 – 0		31,819
14 February 1959	Manchester United	A	Old Trafford	1 – 4	Johnstone	59,604
21 February 1959	Leeds United	A	Elland Road	4 - 0	Barlow (2), Barnes, Fidler	18,500
28 February 1959	Wolverhampton Wanderers	H	Maine Road	1 – 4	Hayes	42,776
7 March 1959	Portsmouth	A	Fratton Park	4 – 3	Fagan, McAdams, Hayes, Sambrook	19,919
14 March 1959	Newcastle United	H	Maine Road	5 – 1	Hayes (2), Sambrook (2), Barnes	25,417
21 March 1959	Tottenham Hotspur	A	White Hart Lane	1 – 3	McAdams	34,493
28 March 1959	Nottingham Forest	H	Maine Road	1 – 1	Barlow	28,146
30 March 1959	West Bromwich Albion	H	Maine Road	0 – 2		25,551
31 March 1959	West Bromwich Albion	A	The Hawthorns	0 – 3		31,600
4 April 1959	Chelsea	A	Stamford Bridge	0 – 2		32,554
11 April 1959	Blackpool	H	Maine Road	0 – 2		27,118
18 April 1959	Blackburn Rovers	A	Ewood Park	1 – 2	Hayes	24,616
20 April 1959	West Ham United	A	Boleyn Ground	1 – 5	Barlow	23,500
25 April 1959	Aston Villa	H	Maine Road	0 – 0		39,661
29 April 1959	Leicester City	H	Maine Road	3 - 1	McAdams, Hayes, Sambrook	46,936

== FA Cup ==
=== Reports ===
Date	Round	Opponents	H / A	Venue	Result F – A	Scorers	Attendance
10 January 1959	Third round	Grimsby Town	A	Blundell Park	2 - 2	Hayes, Barlow	20,000
24 January 1959	Third round replay	Grimsby Town	H	Maine Road	1 – 2	Johnstone	38,840
