= 1951–52 Manchester City F.C. season =

English football club season

Manchester City
1951–52 season
- Manager: Les McDowall
- Stadium: Maine Road
- First Division: 15th
- FA Cup: Third Round
- Top goalscorer: League: Dennis Westcott and Johnny Hart (11); All: Dennis Westcott and Johnny Hart (11)
- Highest home attendance: 57,566 vs Preston North End; 13 October 1951
- Lowest home attendance: 4,748 vs Wolverhampton Wanderers; 19 August 1951

The 1951–52 season was Manchester City's 50th season of competitive football and 35th season in the top division of English football. In addition to the First Division, the club competed in the FA Cup.

== First Division ==
=== League table ===
Pos	Team	Pld	W	D	L	GF	GA	GAv	Pts
13	West Bromwich Albion	42	14	13	15	74	77	0.961	41
14	Burnley	42	15	10	17	56	63	0.889	40
15	Manchester City	42	13	13	16	58	61	0.951	39
16	Wolverhampton Wanderers	42	12	14	16	73	73	1.000	38
17	Derby County	42	15	7	20	63	80	0.788	37

Source: World Football
Rules for classification: 1) Points; 2) Goal average; 3) Goals scored

=== Results summary ===
Overall								Home						Away					
Pld	W	D	L	GF	GA	GAv	Pts	W	D	L	GF	GA	Pts	W	D	L	GF	GA	Pts
42	13	13	16	58	61	0.951	39	7	5	9	29	28	19	6	8	7	29	33	20

=== Reports ===
Date	Opponents	H / A	Venue	Result F–A	Scorers	Attendance
18 August 1951	Wolverhampton Wanderers	H	Maine Road	0–0		4,748
22 August 1951	Huddersfield Town	A	Leeds Road	1–5	Westcott	25,653
25 August 1951	Sunderland	A	Roker Park	0–3		45,396
29 August 1951	Huddersfield Town	H	Maine Road	3–0	Meadows, Hart, Westcott	30,863
1 September 1951	Aston Villa	H	Maine Road	2–2	Paul, Westcott	31,503
5 September 1951	Portsmouth	A	Fratton Park	0–1		30,018
8 September 1951	Derby County	A	Baseball Ground	3–1	Meadows, Hart, Williamson	22,073
15 September 1951	Manchester United	H	Maine Road	1–2	Hart	52,571
22 September 1951	Arsenal	H	Maine Road	0–2		48,367
29 September 1951	Blackpool	A	Bloomfield Road	2–2	Hart, Westcott	33,856
6 October 1951	Tottenham Hotspur	A	White Hart Lane	2–1	Clarke (2)	57,550
13 October 1951	Preston North End	H	Maine Road	1–0	Cunningham (og)	57,566
20 October 1951	Burnley	A	Turf Moor	0–0		30,977
27 October 1951	Charlton Athletic	H	Maine Road	4–2	Meadows, Westcott, Broadis, Clarke	44,348
3 November 1951	Fulham	A	Craven Cottage	2–1	Broadis, Revie	35,000
10 November 1951	Middlesbrough	H	Maine Road	2–1	Westcott, Meadows	47,422
17 November 1951	West Bromwich Albion	A	The Hawthorns	2–3	Hart, own goal	28,000
24 November 1951	Newcastle United	H	Maine Road	2–3	Meadows, Clarke	39,328
1 December 1951	Bolton Wanderers	A	Burnden Park	1–2	Meadows	45,008
8 December 1951	Stoke City	H	Maine Road	0–1		20,397
18 December 1951	Wolverhampton Wanderers	A	Molineux Stadium	2–2	Westcott, Clarke	30,000
22 December 1951	Sunderland	H	Maine Road	3–1	Westcott (2), Clarke	28,535
25 December 1951	Chelsea	A	Stamford Bridge	3–0	Westcott, Broadis, Meadows	34,850
26 December 1951	Chelsea	H	Maine Road	3–1	Meadows, Revie, Westcott	49,700
29 December 1951	Aston Villa	A	Villa Park	2–1	Meadows, Williamson	40,000
1 January 1952	Portsmouth	H	Maine Road	0–1		40,412
5 January 1952	Derby County	H	Maine Road	4–2	Hart (2), Broadis, Clarke	37,572
19 January 1952	Manchester United	A	Old Trafford	1–1	McCourt	54,245
26 January 1952	Arsenal	A	Highbury	2–2	Hart, Phoenix	54,527
9 February 1952	Blackpool	H	Maine Road	0–0		47,437
16 February 1952	Tottenham Hotspur	H	Maine Road	1–1	Revie	38,989
1 March 1952	Preston North End	A	Deepdale	1–1	Hart	38,000
12 March 1952	Burnley	H	Maine Road	0–1		20,132
15 March 1952	Charlton Athletic	A	The Valley	0–0		25,000
22 March 1952	Fulham	H	Maine Road	1–1	Hart	30,945
29 March 1952	Middlesbrough	A	Ayresome Park	2–2	Hart, Revie	18,000
5 April 1952	West Bromwich Albion	H	Maine Road	1–2	Revie	13,842
11 April 1952	Liverpool	H	Maine Road	1–2	Clarke	35,305
12 April 1952	Newcastle United	A	St James’ Park	0–1		40,000
14 April 1952	Liverpool	A	Anfield	2–1	Williamson, Clarke	34,404
19 April 1952	Bolton Wanderers	H	Maine Road	0–3		28,297
26 April 1952	Stoke City	A	Victoria Ground	1–2	Branagan	27,000

== FA Cup ==
=== Results ===
Date	Round	Opponents	H / A	Venue	Result F–A	Scorers	Attendance
12 January 1952	Third Round	Wolverhampton Wanderers	H	Maine Road	2–2	Meadows, Revie	54,797
16 January 1952	Third Round Replay	Wolverhampton Wanderers	A	Molineux Stadium	1–4	Clarke	43,865
