= 1949–50 Manchester City F.C. season =

English football club season

Manchester City
1949–50 season
- Manager: Jock Thomson
- Stadium: Maine Road
- First Division: 21st (relegated)
- FA Cup: Third Round
- Top goalscorer: League: Roy Clarke (9); All: Roy Clarke (10)
- Highest home attendance: 63,704 vs Manchester United; 31 December 1949
- Lowest home attendance: 20,000 vs Liverpool; 29 March 1950

The 1949–50 season was Manchester City's 48th season of competitive football and 34th season in the top division of English football. In addition to the First Division, the club competed in the FA Cup.

The season marked the first with the iconic City keeper Bert Trautmann, who signed in October 1949.

== First Division ==
=== League table ===
Pos	Team	Pld	W	D	L	GF	GA	GAv	Pts	Relegation
18	Everton	42	10	14	18	42	66	0.636	34	
19	Stoke City	42	11	12	19	45	75	0.600	34	
20	Charlton Athletic	42	13	6	23	53	65	0.815	32	
21	Manchester City (R)	42	8	13	21	36	68	0.529	29	Relegation to the Second Division
22	Birmingham City (R)	42	7	14	21	31	67	0.463	28	Relegation to the Second Division

Source: World Football
Rules for classification: 1) Points; 2) Goal average; 3) Goals scored
(R) Relegated

=== Results summary ===
Overall								Home						Away					
Pld	W	D	L	GF	GA	GAv	Pts	W	D	L	GF	GA	Pts	W	D	L	GF	GA	Pts
42	8	13	21	36	68	0.529	29	7	8	6	27	24	22	1	5	15	9	44	7

=== Reports ===
Date	Opponents	H / A	Venue	Result F – A	Scorers	Attendance
20 August 1949	Aston Villa	H	Maine Road	3 – 3	Smith (2), Black	39,594
24 August 1949	Portsmouth	A	Fratton Park	1 – 1	Munro	42,000
27 August 1949	Charlton Athletic	A	The Valley	1 – 3	Fagan	31,000
31 August 1949	Portsmouth	H	Maine Road	1 – 0	Smith	32,631
3 September 1949	Manchester United	A	Old Trafford	1 – 2	Munro	47,706
7 September 1949	Everton	H	Maine Road	0 - 0		27,265
10 September 1949	Fulham	H	Maine Road	2 – 0	Clarke, Turnbull	42,192
17 September 1949	Newcastle United	A	St James’ Park	2 – 4	Clarke, Turnbull	58,141
24 September 1949	Blackpool	H	Maine Road	0 – 3		57,815
1 October 1949	Middlesbrough	A	Ayresome Park	0 – 0		45,000
8 October 1949	Chelsea	A	Stamford Bridge	0 – 3		45,153
15 October 1949	Stoke City	H	Maine Road	1 - 1	Munro	31,151
22 October 1949	Burnley	A	Turf Moor	0 – 0		25,063
29 October 1949	Sunderland	H	Maine Road	2 – 1	Murray, Turnbull	43,026
5 November 1949	Liverpool	A	Anfield	0 – 4		50,536
12 November 1949	Arsenal	H	Maine Road	0 – 2		25,000
19 November 1949	Bolton Wanderers	A	Burnden Park	0 – 3		35,000
26 November 1949	Birmingham City	H	Maine Road	4 – 0	Black (2), Clarke (2)	30,501
5 December 1949	Derby County	A	Baseball Ground	0 – 7		23,680
10 December 1949	West Bromwich Albion	H	Maine Road	1 – 1	Black	29,544
17 December 1949	Aston Villa	A	Villa Park	0 – 1		30,000
24 December 1949	Charlton Athletic	H	Maine Road	2 – 0	Black, Clarke	32,092
26 December 1949	Huddersfield Town	A	Leeds Road	0 – 1		29,989
27 December 1948	Huddersfield Town	H	Maine Road	1 – 2	Clarke	45,000
31 December 1949	Manchester United	H	Maine Road	1 – 2	Black	63,704
4 January 1950	Fulham	A	Craven Cottage	0 – 1		30,000
21 January 1950	Newcastle United	H	Maine Road	1 – 1	Clarke	42,985
4 February 1950	Blackpool	A	Bloomfield Road	0 – 0		25,00”
18 February 1950	Middlesbrough	H	Maine Road	0 – 1		59,252
25 February 1950	Chelsea	H	Maine Road	1 - 1	Hart	32,824
4 March 1950	Stoke City	A	Victoria Ground	0 – 2		30,000
11 March 1950	Bolton Wanderers	H	Maine Road	1 – 1	Black	46,648
18 March 1950	Birmingham City	A	St Andrews	0 – 1		30,000
29 March 1950	Liverpool	H	Maine Road	1 – 2	Alison	20,000
1 April 1950	Arsenal	A	Highbury	1 – 4	Hart	42,000
8 April 1950	Burnley	H	Maine Road	1 – 0	Westcott	31,182
10 April 1950	Wolverhampton Wanderers	H	Maine Road	2 – 1	Turnbull, Smith	36,723
11 April 1950	Wolverhampton Wanderers	A	Molineux Stadium	0 – 3		50,000
15 April 1950	Sunderland	A	Roker Park	2 – 1	Oakes	40,404
22 April 1950	Derby County	H	Maine Road	2 – 2	Smith (2)	52,928
29 April 1950	West Bromwich Albion	A	The Hawthorns	0 – 0		16,760
6 May 1950	Everton	A	Goodison Park	1 – 3	Clarke	29,627

== FA Cup ==
=== Results ===
Date	Round	Opponents	H / A	Venue	Result F – A	Scorers	Attendance
7 January 1950	Third Round	Derby County	H	Maine Road	3 - 5	Black (2), Clarke	53,213
