= 1960–61 Manchester City F.C. season =

English football club season

Manchester City
1960–61 season
- Manager: Les McDowall
- Stadium: Maine Road
- First Division: 13th
- FA Cup: Fourth round
- League Cup: Third round
- Top goalscorer: League: Denis Law (19); All: Denis Law (23)
- Highest home attendance: 50,379 vs Manchester United; 4 March 1961
- Lowest home attendance: 18,252 vs Nottingham Forest; 17 December 1960

The 1960–61 season was Manchester City's 59th season of competitive football and 44th season in the top division of English football. In addition to the First Division, the club competed in the FA Cup and the Football League Cup.

== First Division ==
=== League table ===
Pos	Team	Pld	W	D	L	GF	GA	GAv	Pts	Qualification or relegation
11	Arsenal	42	15	11	16	77	85	0.906	41	
12	Chelsea	42	15	7	20	98	100	0.980	37	
13	Manchester City	42	13	11	18	79	90	0.878	37	
14	Nottingham Forest	42	14	9	19	62	78	0.795	37	Qualification for the Inter-Cities Fairs Cup first round
15	Cardiff City	42	13	11	18	60	85	0.706	37	

Source: World Football
Rules for classification: 1) Points; 2) Goal average; 3) Goals scored

=== Results summary ===
Overall								Home						Away					
Pld	W	D	L	GF	GA	GAv	Pts	W	D	L	GF	GA	Pts	W	D	L	GF	GA	Pts
42	13	11	18	79	90	0.878	37	10	5	6	41	30	25	3	6	12	38	60	12

=== Reports ===
Date	Opponents	H / A	Venue	Result F – A	Scorers	Attendance
20 August 1960	Nottingham Forest	A	City Ground	2 – 2	Law, Hayes	30,133
24 August 1960	Burnley	H	Maine Road	2 – 1	Barlow, Hayes	26,941
30 August 1960	Burnley	A	Turf Moor	3 – 1	Barlow, Law, Colbridge	28,547
3 September 1960	Arsenal	H	Maine Road	0 – 0		36,656
7 September 1960	Sheffield Wednesday	H	Maine Road	1 – 1	Law	35,180
10 September 1960	Newcastle United	A	St James’ Park	3 – 1	Law, Hannah, Hayes	25,904
14 September 1960	Sheffield Wednesday	A	Hillsborough Stadium	1 - 3	Wagstaffe	28,796
17 September 1960	Cardiff City	H	Maine Road	4 – 2	Hayes (2), Barlow (2)	30,932
24 September 1960	West Bromwich Albion	A	The Hawthorns	3 – 6	Barlow, Hannah, Hayes	24,800
1 October 1960	Birmingham City	H	Maine Road	2 – 1	Law, Barlow	27,665
10 October 1960	Tottenham Hotspur	A	White Hart Lane	1 – 1	Colbridge	58,916
15 October 1960	Leicester City	H	Maine Road	3 – 1	Sambrook, Barlow, Hayes	30,193
24 October 1960	Everton	A	Goodison Park	2 - 4	Hayes, Barlow	53,781
29 October 1960	Blackburn Rovers	H	Maine Road	4 – 0	Hayes (2), Law, Hannah	33,641
5 November 1960	Bolton Wanderers	A	Burnden Park	1 – 3	Law	34,005
12 November 1960	West Ham United	H	Maine Road	1 – 2	Barlow	33,721
19 November 1960	Chelsea	A	Stamford Bridge	3 – 6	Betts, Law, Baker	37,346
3 December 1960	Aston Villa	A	Villa Park	1 – 5	Law	25,093
10 December 1960	Wolverhampton Wanderers	H	Maine Road	2 – 4	Law, Baker	30,078
17 December 1960	Nottingham Forest	H	Maine Road	1 – 2	Betts	18,252
24 December 1960	Fulham	H	Maine Road	3 – 2	Baker (2), Colbridge	18,469
26 December 1960	Fulham	A	Craven Cottage	0 – 1		20,240
31 December 1960	Manchester United	A	Old Trafford	1 – 5	Barlow	61,213
14 January 1961	Arsenal	A	Highbury	4 – 5	Hayes (2), Betts, Barlow	36,400
21 January 1961	Newcastle United	H	Maine Road	3 – 3	Barlow, Hayes, Law	19,746
4 February 1961	Cardiff City	A	Ninian Park	3 – 3	Hayes (2), Baker	15,478
11 February 1961	West Bromwich Albion	H	Maine Road	3 – 0	Barlow (2), Betts (pen)	21,382
25 February 1961	Tottenham Hotspur	H	Maine Road	0 – 1		40,278
4 March 1961	Manchester United	H	Maine Road	1 – 3	Wagstaffe	50,479
11 March 1961	Everton	H	Maine Road	2 – 1	Shawcross, Baker	35,102
18 March 1961	Blackburn Rovers	A	Ewood Park	1 – 4	Hayes	19,733
22 March 1961	Birmingham City	A	St Andrews	2 - 3	Law (2)	18,092
25 March 1961	Bolton Wanderers	H	Maine Road	0 – 0		21,816
31 March 1961	Preston North End	H	Maine Road	2 – 3	Law (2)	31,164
1 April 1961	Wolverhampton Wanderers	A	Molineux Stadium	0 – 1		25,365
3 April 1961	Preston North End	A	Deepdale	1 – 1	Baker	25,358
8 April 1961	Chelsea	H	Maine Road	2 – 1	Law, (own goal)	27,720
15 April 1961	West Ham United	A	Boleyn Ground	1 – 1	Barlow	17,982
18 April 1961	Blackpool	H	Maine Road	1 – 1	Law	28,269
22 April 1961	Aston Villa	H	Maine Road	4 – 1	Law (2), Barlow, Hayes	25,235
26 April 1961	Leicester City	A	Filbert Street	2 – 1	Baker (2)	22,248
29 April 1961	Blackpool	A	Bloomfield Road	3 – 3	Barlow, Hayes, Wagstaffe	20,838

== FA Cup ==
=== Reports ===
Date	Round	Opponents	H / A	Venue	Result F – A	Scorers	Attendance
7 January 1961	Third round	Cardiff City	A	Ninian Park	1 - 1	Harrington (og)	35,000
11 January 1961	Third round replay	Cardiff City	H	Maine Road	0 - 0		39,035
16 January 1961	Third round 2nd replay	Cardiff City	N	Highbury	2 - 0	Law, Hayes	24,168
1 February 1961	Fourth round	Luton Town	A	Kenilworth Road	1 - 3	Law	15,783

== Football League Cup ==
=== Reports ===
Date	Round	Opponents	H / A	Venue	Result F – A	Scorers	Attendance
18 October 1960	Second round	Stockport County	H	Maine Road	3 - 0	Law (2), Hayes	21,005
21 November 1960	Third round	Portsmouth	A	Fratton Park	0 - 2		10,368
