= 1953–54 Manchester City F.C. season =

English football club season

Manchester City
1953–54 season
- Manager: Les McDowall
- Stadium: Maine Road
- First Division: 17th
- FA Cup: Fourth Round
- Top goalscorer: League: Don Revie and Johnny Hart (12); All: Don Revie (13)
- Highest home attendance: 53,097 vs Manchester United; 5 September 1953
- Lowest home attendance: 10,841 vs Tottenham Hotspur; 17 March 1954

The 1953–54 season was Manchester City's 52nd season of competitive football and 37th season in the top division of English football. In addition to the First Division, the club competed in the FA Cup.

== First Division ==
=== League table ===
Pos	Team	Pld	W	D	L	GF	GA	GAv	Pts
15	Newcastle United	42	14	10	18	72	77	0.935	38
16	Tottenham Hotspur	42	16	5	21	65	76	0.855	37
17	Manchester City	42	14	9	19	62	77	0.805	37
18	Sunderland	42	14	8	20	81	89	0.910	36
19	Sheffield Wednesday	42	15	6	21	70	91	0.769	36

Source: World Football
Rules for classification: 1) Points; 2) Goal average; 3) Goals scored

=== Results summary ===
Overall								Home						Away					
Pld	W	D	L	GF	GA	GAv	Pts	W	D	L	GF	GA	Pts	W	D	L	GF	GA	Pts
42	14	9	19	62	77	0.805	37	10	4	7	35	31	24	4	5	12	27	46	13

=== Reports ===
Date	Opponents	H / A	Venue	Result F – A	Scorers	Attendance
19 August 1953	Sheffield Wednesday	A	Hillsborough Stadium	0 – 2		48,000
22 August 1953	Wolverhampton Wanderers	H	Maine Road	0 – 4		20,039
24 August 1953	Aston Villa	A	Villa Park	0 – 3		30,000
29 August 1953	Sunderland	A	Roker Park	5 – 4	Hart (2), Whitfield, Clarke, Anders	49,434
2 September 1953	Aston Villa	H	Maine Road	0 – 1		24,918
5 September 1953	Manchester United	H	Maine Road	2 - 0	Hart, Revie	53,097
9 September 1953	Huddersfield Town	A	Leeds Road	1 – 1	Little	24,341
12 September 1953	Cardiff City	H	Maine Road	1 – 1	(og)	31,915
16 September 1953	Huddersfield Town	H	Maine Road	0 – 1		24,580
19 September 1953	Arsenal	A	Highbury	2 – 2	Hart, Spurdle	65,869
26 September 1953	Portsmouth	H	Maine Road	2 – 1	Revie, Hart	35,691
3 October 1953	Blackpool	A	Bloomfield Road	0 - 2		31,765
10 October 1953	Bolton Wanderers	A	Burnden Park	2 – 3	Revie (2)	29,403
17 October 1953	Preston North End	H	Maine Road	1 – 4	Anders	43,295
24 October 1953	Tottenham Hotspur	A	White Hart Lane	0 – 3		37,577
31 October 1953	Burnley	H	Maine Road	3 – 2	Meadows (2), Cunliffe	32,353
7 November 1953	Liverpool	A	Anfield	2 – 2	Hart, Meadows	30,917
14 November 1953	Newcastle United	H	Maine Road	0 – 0		34,150
21 November 1953	Middlesbrough	A	Ayresome Park	1 – 0	(og)	25,000
28 November 1953	West Bromwich Albion	H	Maine Road	2 – 3	Hart, Revie	40,753
5 December 1953	Chelsea	A	The Valley	1 – 2	Meadows	17,813
12 December 1953	Sheffield Wednesday	H	Maine Road	3 – 2	Little, Revie, Davies	27,639
19 December 1953	Wolverhampton Wanderers	A	Molineux Stadium	1 – 3	Davies	27,606
25 December 1953	Sheffield United	A	Bramall Lane	2 – 2	Revie, Hart	35,000
26 December 1953	Sheffield United	H	Maine Road	2 – 1	Hart, (og)	35,783
2 January 1954	Sunderland	H	Maine Road	2 – 1	McAdams, Revie	23,742
16 January 1954	Manchester United	A	Old Trafford	1 – 1	McAdams	46,379
23 January 1954	Cardiff City	A	Ninian Park	3 – 0	Revie, Clarke, Anders	22,000
6 February 1954	Arsenal	H	Maine Road	0 – 0		39,026
13 February 1954	Portsmouth	A	Fratton Park	1 - 4	McAdams	30,013
24 February 1954	Blackpool	H	Maine Road	1 – 4	Clarke	22,515
27 February 1954	Bolton Wanderers	H	Maine Road	3 – 0	McAdams, Meadows, Revie	39,340
6 March 1954	Preston North End	A	Deepdale	0 – 4		21,000
17 March 1954	Tottenham Hotspur	H	Maine Road	4 – 1	Hart, McAdams, Revie, Clarke	10,841
20 March 1954	Burnley	A	Turf Moor	1 – 3	Hart	23,054
3 April 1954	Newcastle United	A	St James’ Park	3 – 4	Hart, McAdams, Clarke	27,760
7 April 1954	Liverpool	H	Maine Road	0 – 2		12,593
10 April 1954	Middlesbrough	H	Maine Road	5 – 2	Revie, Clarke (2), Meadows (2)	28,345
16 April 1954	Chelsea	A	Stamford Bridge	1 – 0	Meadows	59,794
17 April 1954	West Bromwich Albion	A	The Hawthorns	0 – 1		35,000
19 April 1954	Chelsea	H	Maine Road	1 – 1	Branagan	30,620
24 April 1954	Charlton Athletic	H	Maine Road	3 – 0	McAdams (2), Spurdle	19,549

== FA Cup ==
=== Results ===
Date	Round	Opponents	H / A	Venue	Result F – A	Scorers	Attendance
9 January 1954	Third Round	Bradford Park Avenue	A	Park Avenue	5 - 2	McAdams (3), Revie, Clarke	22,194
30 January 1954	Fourth Round	Tottenham Hotspur	H	Maine Road	0 - 1		50,576
