= 1961–62 Manchester City F.C. season =

English football club season

Manchester City
1961–62 season
- Manager: Les McDowall
- Stadium: Maine Road
- First Division: 12th
- FA Cup: Fourth Round
- League Cup: First Round
- Top goalscorer: League: Peter Dobing (21); All: Peter Dobing (22)
- Highest home attendance: 49,959 vs Manchester United; 10 February 1962
- Lowest home attendance: 15,971 vs Blackpool; 7 December 1961

The 1961–62 season was Manchester City's 60th season of competitive football and 45th season in the top division of English football. In addition to the First Division, in which the club placed 12th, the club competed in the FA Cup and the Football League Cup, being knocked out in the fourth round and the first round, respectively.

== First Division ==
=== League table ===
Pos	Team	Pld	W	D	L	GF	GA	GAv	Pts
10	Arsenal	42	16	11	15	71	72	0.986	43
11	Bolton Wanderers	42	16	10	16	62	66	0.939	42
12	Manchester City	42	17	7	18	78	81	0.963	41
13	Blackpool	42	15	11	16	70	75	0.933	41
14	Leicester City	42	17	6	19	72	71	1.014	40

Source: World Football
Rules for classification: 1) Points; 2) Goal average; 3) Goals scored

=== Results summary ===
Overall								Home						Away					
Pld	W	D	L	GF	GA	GAv	Pts	W	D	L	GF	GA	Pts	W	D	L	GF	GA	Pts
42	17	7	18	78	81	0.963	41	11	3	7	46	38	25	6	4	11	32	43	16

=== Reports ===
Date	Opponents	H / A	Venue	Result F – A	Scorers	Attendance
19 August 1961	Leicester City	H	Maine Road	3 – 1	Kennedy, Barlow, Hayes	28,899
23 August 1961	Fulham	A	Craven Cottage	4 – 3	Cheetham (2), Betts, Hayes	16,175
26 August 1961	Ipswich Town	A	Portman Road	4 – 2	Dobing, Barlow, Law, Hayes	21,463
30 August 1961	Fulham	H	Maine Road	2 – 1	Baker, Hayes	36,775
2 September 1961	Burnley	H	Maine Road	1 – 3	Baker	38,171
6 September 1961	Everton	A	Goodison Park	2 – 0	Dobing, Baker	38,023
9 September 1961	Arsenal	A	Highbury	0 - 3		42,746
16 September 1961	Bolton Wanderers	H	Maine Road	2 – 1	Baker, Hayes	27,275
20 September 1961	Everton	H	Maine Road	1 – 3	Hayes	35,102
23 September 1961	Manchester United	A	Old Trafford	2 – 3	Stiles (og), Kennedy	55,933
30 September 1961	West Bromwich Albion	A	The Hawthorns	2 – 2	Baker, Jones (og)	20,900
7 October 1961	Cardiff City	H	Maine Road	1 – 2	Sambrook	20,143
14 October 1961	Tottenham Hotspur	A	White Hart Lane	0 - 2		40,344
21 October 1961	Nottingham Forest	H	Maine Road	3 – 0	Barlow, Hayes, Dobing	20,258
28 October 1961	Wolverhampton Wanderers	A	Molineux Stadium	1 – 4	Barlow	22,821
4 November 1961	West Ham United	H	Maine Road	3 – 5	Dobing (3)	18,839
11 November 1961	Sheffield United	A	Bramhall Lane	1 – 3	Hannah	18,135
18 November 1961	Chelsea	H	Maine Road	2 – 2	Kennedy, Barlow	16,583
25 November 1961	Aston Villa	A	Villa Park	1 – 2	Dobing	26,617
2 December 1961	Blackpool	H	Maine Road	2 – 4	Dobing, Barlow	15,971
9 December 1961	Blackburn Rovers	A	Ewood Park	1 – 4	Kennedy	13,892
16 December 1961	Leicester City	A	Filbert Street	0 – 2		15,196
23 December 1961	Ipswich Town	H	Maine Road	3 – 0	Young, Dobing, Hayes	25,753
26 December 1961	Birmingham City	A	St Andrews	1 – 1	Dobing	21,902
13 January 1962	Burnley	A	Turf Moor	3 – 6	Young, Dobing, Hayes	22,728
20 January 1962	Arsenal	H	Maine Road	3 – 2	Young (2), own goal	20,414
3 February 1962	Bolton Wanderers	A	Burnden Park	2 – 0	Hayes, Wagstaffe	18,454
10 February 1962	Manchester United	H	Maine Road	0 – 2		49,959
21 February 1962	West Bromwich Albion	H	Maine Road	3 – 1	Oakes, Dobing, Young	17,225
24 February 1962	Cardiff City	A	Ninian Park	0 – 0		19,600
3 March 1962	Tottenham Hostpur	H	Maine Road	6 – 2	Dobing (3), Hayes, Young, Baker (og)	31,706
10 March 1962	Nottingham Forest	A	City Ground	2 - 1	Young, Hayes	20,199
17 March 1962	Wolverhampton Wanderers	H	Maine Road	2 – 2	Dobing (2)	28,407
24 March 1962	West Ham United	A	Boleyn Ground	4 – 0	Dobing (3), Hayes	25,808
31 March 1962	Sheffield United	H	Maine Road	1 – 1	Hayes	19,157
7 April 1962	Chelsea	A	Stamford Bridge	1 – 1	Hayes	18,629
11 April 1962	Birmingham City	H	Maine Road	1 – 4	Smith (og)	21,941
14 April 1962	Aston Villa	H	Maine Road	1 – 0	Young	18,564
20 April 1962	Sheffield Wednesday	H	Maine Road	3 – 1	Kennedy, Dobing, Hayes	32,131
21 April 1962	Blackpool	A	Bloomfield Road	1 – 3	Leivers	19,954
23 April 1962	Sheffield Wednesday	A	Hillsborough Stadium	0 – 1		22,084
28 April 1962	Blackburn Rovers	H	Maine Road	3 – 1	Young (2), Kennedy	22,254
