= Joe Hayes (footballer) =

English footballer

Personal information
- Date of birth: 20 January 1936
- Place of birth: Kearsley, Lancashire, England
- Date of death: 4 February 1999 (aged 63)
- Position: Inside forward

Senior career*
Years	Team	Apps	(Gls)
1953–1965	Manchester City	331	(142)
1965–1966	Barnsley	26	(3)
1966–1967	Wigan Athletic	32	(7)
Total		389	(152)
- * Club domestic league appearances and goals

Joe Hayes (20 January 1936 – 1 February 1999) was an English footballer who played as an inside forward for Manchester City, Barnsley and Wigan Athletic. He is tied with Francis Lee as the second highest goalscorer in the Manchester derby, and is Manchester City's fifth highest goalscorer of all time.

== Career ==
Hayes was born in Kearsley, near Bolton, Lancashire in 1936, and worked in a cotton mill and a coal mine prior to becoming a footballer. In August 1953 he had a trial with Manchester City, and made his debut two months later against Tottenham. The teenage Hayes appeared in the 1955 FA Cup final, but finished on the losing side. 12 months later Manchester City reached the final again, and Hayes scored the first goal in a 3–1 win. Hayes was a regular goalscorer in the late 1950s and early 1960s, until a knee injury occurring in September 1963 had a noticeable effect on his abilities, after which first team opportunities became limited. He was transferred to Barnsley in the 1965 close season, and later went on to play for Wigan Athletic, appearing 32 times and scoring seven goals for the club. In total, Hayes scored 152 goals in 363 appearances for Manchester City, making him the fifth highest Manchester City goalscorer of all time.

== Personal life ==
Hayes died in 1999 at the age of 63.

== Honours ==
Manchester City

- FA Cup: 1955–56; runner-up: 1954–55
