= 1954–55 FA Cup =

Tournament details
- Country: England; Wales

Final positions
- Champions: Newcastle United (6th title)
- Runners-up: Manchester City

The 1954–55 FA Cup was the 74th season of the world's oldest football cup competition, the Football Association Challenge Cup, commonly known as the FA Cup. Newcastle United won the competition for the sixth time, beating Manchester City 3–1 in the final at Wembley.

Matches were scheduled to be played at the stadium of the team named first on the date specified for each round, which was always a Saturday. Some matches, however, might be rescheduled for other days if there were clashes with games for other competitions or the weather was inclement. If scores were level after 90 minutes had been played, a replay would take place at the stadium of the second-named team later the same week. If the replayed match was drawn further replays would be held until a winner was determined. If scores were level after 90 minutes had been played in a replay, a 30-minute period of extra time would be played.

== Calendar ==
Round	Date
Preliminary round	Saturday 11 September 1954
First round qualifying	Saturday 25 September 1954
Second round qualifying	Saturday 9 October 1954
Third round qualifying	Saturday 23 October 1954
Fourth round qualifying	Saturday 6 November 1954
First round proper	Saturday 20 November 1954
Second round proper	Saturday 11 December 1954
Third round proper	Saturday 8 January 1955
Fourth round proper	Saturday 29 January 1955
Fifth round proper	Saturday 19 February 1955
Sixth round proper	Saturday 12 March 1955
Semi-finals	Saturday 26 March 1955
Final	Saturday 7 May 1955

== Qualifying rounds ==
Most participating clubs that were not members of the Football League competed in the qualifying rounds to secure one of 30 places available in the first round.

The winners from the fourth qualifying round were Scarborough, Horden Colliery Welfare, Blyth Spartans, Stanley United, Netherfield (Kendal), Hyde United, Rhyl, Wigan Athletic, Creswell Colliery, Selby Town, Corby Town, Nuneaton Borough, Hinckley Athletic, Boston United, Kettering Town, Wellington Town, Cambridge United, Bedford Town, Chelmsford City, Walthamstow Avenue, Hounslow Town, Barnet, Headington United, Tunbridge Wells United, Hastings United, Dorchester Town, Barnstaple Town, Newport (IOW), Merthyr Tydfil and Frome Town.

Those appearing in the competition proper for the first time were Stanley United, Creswell Colliery, Corby Town, Hinckley Athletic, Hounslow Town, Dorchester Town and Frome Town. However, Tunbridge Wells United was featuring at this stage for the first time in their own right after predecessor outfit Tunbridge Wells Rangers had last qualified for the main draw in 1938–39 and Hyde United was appearing here for the first time since their record-setting 26-0 loss to Preston North End in 1887-88.

== First round proper ==
At this stage the 48 clubs from the Football League Third Division North and South joined the 30 non-league clubs who came through the qualifying rounds. The final two non-league sides in the draw, Crook Town and Bishop Auckland, were given byes to this round as the champions and runners-up from the previous season's FA Amateur Cup.

Matches were scheduled to be played on Saturday, 20 November 1954. Seven were drawn and went to replays, with one of these going to a second replay.

Tie no	Home team	Score	Away team	Date
1	Barnet	1–4	Southampton	20 November 1954
2	Barrow	1–1	Darlington	20 November 1954
Replay	Darlington	2–1	Barrow	24 November 1954
3	Bristol City	1–2	Southend United	20 November 1954
4	Dorchester Town	2–0	Bedford Town	20 November 1954
5	Reading	3–3	Colchester United	20 November 1954
Replay	Colchester United	1–2	Reading	25 November 1954
6	Walsall	5–2	Shrewsbury Town	20 November 1954
7	Gillingham	2–0	Newport County	20 November 1954
8	Grimsby Town	2–1	Halifax Town	20 November 1954
9	Swindon Town	0–2	Crystal Palace	20 November 1954
10	Bishop Auckland	5–1	Kettering Town	20 November 1954
11	Tranmere Rovers	3–3	Rochdale	20 November 1954
Replay	Rochdale	1–0	Tranmere Rovers	23 November 1954
12	Stockport County	0–1	Carlisle United	20 November 1954
13	Queens Park Rangers	2–2	Walthamstow Avenue	20 November 1954
Replay	Walthamstow Avenue	2–2	Queens Park Rangers	25 November 1954
Replay	Queens Park Rangers	0–4	Walthamstow Avenue	29 November 1954
14	Accrington Stanley	7–1	Creswell Colliery	20 November 1954
15	Barnsley	3–2	Wigan Athletic	20 November 1954
16	Brentford	2–1	Nuneaton Borough	20 November 1954
17	Crook Town	5–3	Stanley United	20 November 1954
18	Northampton Town	0–1	Coventry City	20 November 1954
19	Brighton & Hove Albion	5–0	Tunbridge Wells United	20 November 1954
20	Norwich City	4–2	Headington United	20 November 1954
21	Bradford City	3–1	Mansfield Town	20 November 1954
22	Millwall	3–2	Exeter City	20 November 1954
23	Oldham Athletic	1–0	Crewe Alexandra	20 November 1954
24	Frome Town	0–3	Leyton Orient	20 November 1954
25	Bradford Park Avenue	2–0	Southport	20 November 1954
26	Hartlepools United	1–0	Chesterfield	20 November 1954
27	Selby Town	2–1	Rhyl	20 November 1954
28	Torquay United	4–0	Cambridge United	20 November 1954
29	Workington	5–1	Hyde United	20 November 1954
30	York City	3–2	Scarborough	20 November 1954
31	Netherfield (Kendal)	3–3	Wrexham	20 November 1954
Replay	Wrexham	4–0	Netherfield (Kendal)	24 November 1954
32	Aldershot	3–1	Chelmsford City	20 November 1954
33	Horden Colliery Welfare	0–1	Scunthorpe & Lindsey United	20 November 1954
34	Gateshead	6–0	Chester	20 November 1954
35	Hounslow Town	2–4	Hastings United	20 November 1954
36	Boston United	1–1	Blyth Spartans	20 November 1954
Replay	Blyth Spartans	5–4	Boston United	24 November 1954
37	Merthyr Tydfil	1–1	Wellington Town	20 November 1954
Replay	Wellington Town	1–6	Merthyr Tydfil	24 November 1954
38	Hinckley Athletic	4–3	Newport (IOW)	20 November 1954
39	Barnstaple Town	1–4	Bournemouth & Boscombe Athletic	20 November 1954
40	Corby Town	0–2	Watford	20 November 1954

== Second round proper ==
The matches were scheduled for Saturday, 11 December 1954. Four matches were drawn, with replays taking place later the same week.

Tie no	Home team	Score	Away team	Date
1	Bournemouth & Boscombe Athletic	1–0	Oldham Athletic	11 December 1954
2	Dorchester Town	2–5	York City	11 December 1954
3	Rochdale	2–1	Hinckley Athletic	11 December 1954
4	Gillingham	1–1	Reading	11 December 1954
Replay	Reading	5–3	Gillingham	13 December 1954
5	Grimsby Town	4–1	Southampton	11 December 1954
6	Wrexham	1–2	Walsall	11 December 1954
7	Brentford	4–1	Crook Town	11 December 1954
8	Coventry City	4–0	Scunthorpe & Lindsey United	11 December 1954
9	Norwich City	0–0	Brighton & Hove Albion	11 December 1954
Replay	Brighton & Hove Albion	5–1	Norwich City	15 December 1954
10	Bradford City	7–1	Merthyr Tydfil	11 December 1954
11	Millwall	3–2	Accrington Stanley	11 December 1954
12	Carlisle United	2–2	Watford	11 December 1954
Replay	Watford	4–1	Carlisle United	15 December 1954
13	Crystal Palace	2–4	Bishop Auckland	11 December 1954
14	Bradford Park Avenue	2–3	Southend United	11 December 1954
15	Hartlepools United	4–0	Aldershot	11 December 1954
16	Blyth Spartans	1–3	Torquay United	11 December 1954
17	Selby Town	0–2	Hastings United	11 December 1954
18	Walthamstow Avenue	0–3	Darlington	11 December 1954
19	Gateshead	3–3	Barnsley	11 December 1954
Replay	Barnsley	0–1	Gateshead	16 December 1954
20	Leyton Orient	0–1	Workington	11 December 1954

== Third round proper ==
The 44 First and Second Division clubs entered the competition at this stage. The matches were scheduled for Saturday, 8 January 1955. Ten matches were drawn and went to replays, with three of these requiring a second replay. Notable is tie no. 3, between Bury and Stoke City, which went to four replays before Stoke won in the final game, with an aggregated score of 9–10.

Tie no	Home team	Score	Away team	Date
1	Blackpool	0–2	York City	8 January 1955
2	Bournemouth & Boscombe Athletic	0–1	West Bromwich Albion	8 January 1955
3	Bury	1–1	Stoke City	8 January 1955
Replay	Stoke City	1–1	Bury	12 January 1955
Replay	Bury	3–3	Stoke City	17 January 1955
Replay	Stoke City	2–2	Bury	19 January 1955
Replay	Bury	2–3	Stoke City	24 January 1955
4	Rochdale	1–3	Charlton Athletic	8 January 1955
5	Watford	1–2	Doncaster Rovers	8 January 1955
6	Reading	1–1	Manchester United	8 January 1955
Replay	Manchester United	4–1	Reading	12 January 1955
7	Blackburn Rovers	0–2	Swansea Town	8 January 1955
8	Sheffield Wednesday	2–1	Hastings United	8 January 1955
9	Bolton Wanderers	3–1	Millwall	8 January 1955
10	Grimsby Town	2–5	Wolverhampton Wanderers	8 January 1955
11	Middlesbrough	1–4	Notts County	8 January 1955
12	Sunderland	1–0	Burnley	8 January 1955
13	Derby County	1–3	Manchester City	8 January 1955
14	Lincoln City	1–1	Liverpool	8 January 1955
Replay	Liverpool	1–0	Lincoln City	12 January 1955
15	Luton Town	5–0	Workington	8 January 1955
16	Everton	3–1	Southend United	8 January 1955
17	Sheffield United	1–3	Nottingham Forest	8 January 1955
18	Ipswich Town	2–2	Bishop Auckland	8 January 1955
Replay	Bishop Auckland	3–0	Ipswich Town	12 January 1955
19	Fulham	2–3	Preston North End	8 January 1955
20	Brentford	1–1	Bradford City	8 January 1955
Replay	Bradford City	2–2	Brentford	12 January 1955
Replay	Brentford	1–0	Bradford City	20 January 1955
21	Bristol Rovers	2–1	Portsmouth	8 January 1955
22	West Ham United	2–2	Port Vale	8 January 1955
Replay	Port Vale	3–1	West Ham United	10 January 1955
23	Brighton & Hove Albion	2–2	Aston Villa	8 January 1955
Replay	Aston Villa	4–2	Brighton & Hove Albion	10 January 1955
24	Plymouth Argyle	0–1	Newcastle United	8 January 1955
25	Hull City	0–2	Birmingham City	8 January 1955
26	Chelsea	2–0	Walsall	8 January 1955
27	Hartlepools United	1–1	Darlington	8 January 1955
Replay	Darlington	2–2	Hartlepools United	12 January 1955
Replay	Hartlepools United	2–0	Darlington	17 January 1955
28	Huddersfield Town	3–3	Coventry City	8 January 1955
Replay	Coventry City	1–2	Huddersfield Town	13 January 1955
29	Arsenal	1–0	Cardiff City	8 January 1955
30	Leeds United	2–2	Torquay United	8 January 1955
Replay	Torquay United	4–0	Leeds United	12 January 1955
31	Rotherham United	1–0	Leicester City	8 January 1955
32	Gateshead	0–2	Tottenham Hotspur	8 January 1955

== Fourth round proper ==
The matches were scheduled for Saturday, 29 January 1955. Four matches were drawn and went to replays, which were all played in the following midweek match. Once again there was a tie which went to four replays, this one being between Doncaster Rovers and Aston Villa. Rovers finally won the fixture in the fifth match with an aggregated score of 6–4.

Bishop Auckland was the last non-league club left in the competition.

Tie no	Home team	Score	Away team	Date
1	Preston North End	3–3	Sunderland	29 January 1955
Replay	Sunderland	2–0	Preston North End	2 February 1955
2	Sheffield Wednesday	1–1	Notts County	29 January 1955
Replay	Notts County	1–0	Sheffield Wednesday	3 February 1955
3	Wolverhampton Wanderers	1–0	Arsenal	29 January 1955
4	West Bromwich Albion	2–4	Charlton Athletic	29 January 1955
5	Everton	0–4	Liverpool	29 January 1955
6	Doncaster Rovers	0–0	Aston Villa	29 January 1955
Replay	Aston Villa	2–2	Doncaster Rovers	2 February 1955
Replay	Doncaster Rovers	1–1	Aston Villa	7 February 1955
Replay	Aston Villa	0–0	Doncaster Rovers	14 February 1955
Replay	Doncaster Rovers	3–1	Aston Villa	15 February 1955
7	Bishop Auckland	1–3	York City	29 January 1955
8	Newcastle United	3–2	Brentford	29 January 1955
9	Tottenham Hotspur	4–2	Port Vale	29 January 1955
10	Manchester City	2–0	Manchester United	29 January 1955
11	Bristol Rovers	1–3	Chelsea	29 January 1955
12	Hartlepools United	1–1	Nottingham Forest	29 January 1955
Replay	Nottingham Forest	2–1	Hartlepools United	2 February 1955
13	Swansea Town	3–1	Stoke City	29 January 1955
14	Torquay United	0–1	Huddersfield Town	29 January 1955
15	Rotherham United	1–5	Luton Town	29 January 1955
16	Birmingham City	2–1	Bolton Wanderers	29 January 1955

== Fifth round proper ==
The matches were scheduled for Saturday, 19 February 1955. Two matches went to replays in the following mid-week fixture, with the Nottingham Forest–Newcastle United match requiring a second replay to settle it in favour of United.

Tie no	Home team	Score	Away team	Date
1	Liverpool	0–2	Huddersfield Town	19 February 1955
2	Notts County	1–0	Chelsea	19 February 1955
3	Nottingham Forest	1–1	Newcastle United	19 February 1955
Replay	Newcastle United	2–2	Nottingham Forest	28 February 1955
Replay	Newcastle United	2–1	Nottingham Forest	2 March 1955
4	Wolverhampton Wanderers	4–1	Charlton Athletic	19 February 1955
5	Luton Town	0–2	Manchester City	19 February 1955
6	Swansea Town	2–2	Sunderland	19 February 1955
Replay	Sunderland	1–0	Swansea Town	23 February 1955
7	York City	3–1	Tottenham Hotspur	19 February 1955
8	Birmingham City	2–1	Doncaster Rovers	19 February 1955

== Sixth round proper ==
The four quarter-final ties were scheduled to be played on Saturday, 12 March 1955. The Newcastle United–Huddersfield Town game went to a replay before United went through.

Tie no	Home team	Score	Away team	Date
1	Notts County	0–1	York City	12 March 1955
2	Sunderland	2–0	Wolverhampton Wanderers	12 March 1955
3	Huddersfield Town	1–1	Newcastle United	12 March 1955
Replay	Newcastle United	2–0	Huddersfield Town	16 March 1955
4	Birmingham City	0–1	Manchester City	12 March 1955

== Semi-finals ==
The semi-final matches were played on Saturday, 26 March 1955, with the Newcastle United–York City match replaying on the 30th. Newcastle and Manchester City won their ties to meet in the final at Wembley.

26 March 1955
15:00

Newcastle United	1–1	York City
Keeble		Bottom

Hillsborough, Sheffield

Replay

30 March 1955
19:45

York City	0–2	Newcastle United
		Keeble; White

Roker Park, Sunderland

26 March 1955
15:00

Manchester City	1–0	Sunderland
Roy Clarke 57'

Villa Park, Birmingham
Attendance: 58,489

== Final ==
The 1955 FA Cup Final was contested by Newcastle United and Manchester City at Wembley. Newcastle won 3–1, with goals from Jackie Milburn in the first minute (after 45 seconds, setting a new record in a final at Wembley, which was held until 1997), Bobby Mitchell and George Hannah. Bobby Johnstone scored City's goal.

=== Match details ===
7 May 1955
15:00 BST

Newcastle United	3–1	Manchester City
Milburn 1'; Mitchell 52'; Hannah 59'		Johnstone 45'

Wembley, London
Attendance: 100,000
Referee: Reg Leafe

Newcastle United	Manchester City
