= Johnny Hart (English footballer) =

English footballer and manager (1928–2018)

John Paul Hart (8 June 1928 – 26 November 2018) was an English football player and manager who spent his entire career with Manchester City.

== Biography ==
Golborne-born Hart played for Manchester City as an inside forward in 169 Football League matches between 1947 and 1961, scoring 67 goals, in a career disrupted by injury. He succeeded Malcolm Allison as the club's manager for six months – from March to October 1973 – before ill-health forced him to retire. He was inducted into Manchester City's Hall of Fame in 2006.

Hart's sons Paul and Nigel both played league football as centre halves. Paul also followed his father into management.
