= Manchester City F.C. league record by opponent =

Manchester City Football Club is an English association football club based in Manchester, which competes in the Premier League. Founded as West Gorton (St Marks) in 1880, the club after several changes of identity adopted the name 'Manchester City' in 1894. During the 1891–92 season, Manchester City joined the Football Alliance. The team was elected to The Football League in 1892, where the club remained until 1992, when the League's First Division was replaced as the top level of English football by the Premier League.

Manchester City's first team has competed in a number of nationally contested leagues, and its record against each club faced in these competitions is listed below. The team that Manchester City has met most in league competition is Arsenal, against whom they have contested 194 league matches. Arsenal have also defeated Manchester City in league competition on 89 occasions, which represents the most Manchester City have lost against any club. Manchester City have defeated Everton on 76 different occasions in the league, more times than they have defeated any other club in league fixtures – City have played Everton 184 times. Manchester City have drawn more matches with Manchester United than with any other club; out of the 172 league matches between the two teams, 53 have finished without a winner.

City have scored 282 league goals against Newcastle United (176 games). They have conceded 314 goals against Liverpool (in 178 games). Their worst win % against current Premier League teams is also against Liverpool (25.8%), while their best win % is against Bournemouth (86.4%)

== Key ==
- The records include the results of matches played in the Football Alliance (from 1891 to 1892), The Football League (from 1892 to 2002) and the Premier League (since 1992). Wartime matches are regarded as unofficial and are excluded, as are matches from the abandoned 1939–40 season. Test matches are not included. The 1999 Second Division play-off final is regarded as an away match for the purposes of classification in this table.
- For the sake of simplicity, present-day names are used throughout: for example, results against Newton Heath, Small Heath and Woolwich Arsenal are integrated into the records against Manchester United, Birmingham City and Arsenal, respectively.
- † Clubs with this background and symbol in the "Club" column are competing in the 2025–26 Premier League alongside Manchester City.
- ‡ Clubs with this background and symbol in the "Club" column are defunct.
- Pld = matches played; W = matches won; D = matches drawn; L = matches lost; GF = Goals scored; GA = Goals conceded; Win% = percentage of total matches won

== All-time league record ==
Statistics correct as of matches played at the end of the 2024–25 season. (Note: Records for seasons 2014–15 through 2024–25 have been sourced from FBref, with additional data on all seasons from Stat City website.)

Manchester City F.C. league record by opponent
Club	Pld	W	D	L	GF	GA	Pld	W	D	L	GF	GA	Pld	W	D	L	GF	GA	Win%	First	Last	Ref(s)
Club	Home						Away						Total						Win%	First	Last	Ref(s)
Arsenal †	97	39	24	34	149	134	97	20	22	55	96	172	194	59	46	89	245	306	30.41	1893–94	2024-25	(Note: Arsenal statistics include matches played against Woolwich Arsenal.)
Aston Villa †	83	52	15	16	178	96	82	20	25	38	97	137	166	72	40	54	275	233	43.37	1899–1900	2024-25	
Barnsley	14	8	4	2	42	17	14	5	6	3	20	13	28	13	10	5	62	30	46.43	1898–99	2001–02	
Birmingham City	67	45	13	9	130	57	67	15	12	40	80	144	134	60	25	49	210	201	44.78	1891–92	2010–11	(Note: Birmingham City statistics include matches played against Small Heath and matches played against Birmingham.)
Birmingham St George's ‡	1	1	0	0	4	3	1	1	0	0	1	0	2	2	0	0	5	3	100.00	1891–92	1891–92	
Blackburn Rovers	56	25	17	14	101	68	56	15	10	31	74	103	112	40	27	45	175	171	35.71	1899–1900	2011–12	
Blackpool	30	16	4	10	63	50	30	10	14	6	53	46	60	26	18	16	116	96	43.33	1896–97	2010–11	
Bolton Wanderers	56	31	11	14	104	65	56	13	15	28	66	106	112	44	26	42	170	171	39.29	1897–98	2011–12	
Bootle ‡	2	1	1	0	10	3	2	0	0	2	4	7	4	1	1	2	14	10	25.00	1891–92	1892–93	
Bournemouth †	11	10	1	0	38	9	11	9	1	1	21	5	22	19	2	1	59	14	86.36	1987–88	2024-25	
Bradford City	16	13	1	2	43	17	16	5	4	7	24	25	32	18	5	9	67	42	56.25	1908–09	2001–02	
Bradford Park Avenue	6	5	0	1	22	8	6	1	1	4	7	13	12	6	1	5	29	21	50.00	1909–10	1946–47	
Brentford †	8	6	0	2	14	7	8	3	2	3	13	10	16	9	2	5	27	17	56.25	1935–36	2024-25	
Brighton & Hove Albion †	15	12	3	0	37	10	15	7	3	5	30	20	30	19	6	5	67	30	63.33	1979–80	2024-25	
Bristol City	11	6	3	2	23	12	11	0	3	8	8	18	22	6	6	10	31	30	27.27	1902–03	1979–80	
Bristol Rovers	1	0	1	0	0	0	1	0	1	0	2	2	2	0	2	0	2	2	0.00	1998–99	1998–99	
Burnley †	51	31	13	7	124	53	51	18	12	21	84	79	102	49	25	28	208	132	48.04	1897–98	2023–24	
Burton Swifts ‡	8	4	2	2	23	12	8	2	3	3	15	18	16	6	5	5	38	30	37.50	1891–92	1898–99	
Burton United ‡	1	1	0	0	2	0	1	1	0	0	5	0	2	2	0	0	7	0	100.00	1902–03	1902–03	
Burton Wanderers ‡	3	1	2	0	4	3	3	0	1	2	2	13	6	1	3	2	6	16	16.67	1894–95	1896–97	
Bury ‡	22	12	8	2	52	25	22	9	4	9	43	43	44	21	12	11	95	68	47.73	1894–95	1997–98	
Cambridge United	1	1	0	0	5	0	1	0	1	0	0	0	2	1	1	0	5	0	50.00	1983–84	1983–84	
Cardiff City	21	12	8	1	52	26	21	6	8	7	38	38	42	18	16	8	90	64	42.86	1921–22	2018–19	
Carlisle United	4	2	0	2	7	7	4	1	2	1	2	3	8	3	2	3	9	10	37.50	1965–66	1984–85	
Charlton Athletic	27	13	6	8	55	37	27	7	8	12	37	47	54	20	14	20	92	84	37.04	1936–37	2006–07	
Chelsea †	80	38	18	24	119	88	80	19	23	38	91	129	160	57	41	62	210	217	35.63	1907–08	2024-25	
Chesterfield	5	3	2	0	13	5	5	4	1	0	8	2	10	7	3	0	21	7	70.00	1902–03	1998–99	(Note: Chesterfield statistics include matches played against Chesterfield Town.)
Colchester United	1	1	0	0	2	1	1	1	0	0	1	0	2	2	0	0	3	1	100.00	1998–99	1998–99	
Coventry City	32	23	5	4	63	24	32	8	11	13	42	53	64	31	16	17	105	77	48.44	1938–39	2001–02	
Crewe Alexandra	8	7	0	1	26	6	8	3	3	2	13	12	16	10	3	3	39	18	62.50	1891–92	2001–02	
Crystal Palace †	33	18	8	7	69	35	33	16	9	8	45	32	66	34	17	15	114	67	51.52	1964–65	2024-25	
Darlington ‡	1	1	0	0	7	0	1	0	1	0	2	2	2	1	1	0	9	2	50.00	1926–27	1926–27	
Darwen	6	5	0	1	29	8	6	3	0	3	11	14	12	8	0	4	40	22	66.67	1892–93	1898–99	
Derby County	46	29	9	8	93	45	46	11	11	24	50	87	92	40	20	32	143	132	43.48	1899–1900	2007–08	
Doncaster Rovers	2	1	1	0	7	4	2	1	0	1	5	5	4	2	1	1	12	9	50.00	1902–03	1950–51	
Everton †	92	50	23	19	161	86	92	26	23	43	109	154	184	76	46	62	270	238	41.30	1899–1900	2024-25	
Fulham †	34	22	6	6	84	39	34	16	9	9	71	56	68	38	15	15	155	95	55.88	1909–10	2024-25	
Gainsborough Trinity	5	4	1	0	20	2	5	3	0	2	11	6	10	7	1	2	31	8	70.00	1896–97	1909–10	
Gillingham	2	1	1	0	4	1	3	2	1	0	7	3	5	3	2	0	11	4	60.00	1998–99	2001–02	
Glossop North End	4	2	1	1	12	8	4	4	0	0	8	1	8	6	1	1	20	9	75.00	1898–99	1909–10	(Note: Glossop North End statistics include matches played against Glossop.)
Grimsby Town	27	20	2	5	63	33	27	6	8	13	41	64	54	26	10	18	104	97	48.15	1891–92	2001–02	
Huddersfield Town	36	17	9	10	71	43	36	7	17	12	35	40	72	24	26	22	106	83	33.33	1920–21	2018–19	
Hull City	11	7	4	0	25	8	11	4	3	4	20	17	22	11	7	4	45	25	50.00	1909–10	2016–17	
Ipswich Town	30	18	7	5	55	26	30	3	7	20	27	48	60	21	14	25	82	74	35.00	1961–62	2024-25	
Leeds City ‡	1	1	0	0	3	0	1	1	0	0	3	1	2	2	0	0	6	1	100.00	1909–10	1909–10	
Leeds United †	50	28	9	13	94	51	50	16	9	25	95	78	100	44	18	38	158	129	44.00	1924–25	2022–23	
Leicester City	54	34	11	9	134	71	54	21	13	20	69	77	108	55	24	29	203	148	50.93	1895–96	2024-25	(Note: Leicester City statistics include matches played against Leicester Fosse.)
Leyton Orient	7	7	0	0	28	5	7	3	2	2	16	12	14	10	2	2	44	17	71.43	1909–10	1965–66	(Note: Leyton Orient statistics include matches played against Clapton Orient and Orient.)
Lincoln City	11	9	0	2	40	13	11	4	0	7	13	20	22	13	0	9	53	33	59.09	1891–92	1998–99	
Liverpool †	89	32	25	32	135	132	89	14	21	54	109	182	178	46	46	86	244	314	25.84	1893–94	2024-25	
Loughborough ‡	4	3	1	0	14	2	4	3	0	1	10	5	8	6	1	1	24	7	75.00	1895–96	1898–99	
Luton Town	19	11	5	3	38	18	19	4	7	8	25	35	38	15	12	11	63	53	39.47	1897–98	2023–24	
Macclesfield Town ‡	1	1	0	0	2	0	1	1	0	0	3	0	2	2	0	0	3	0	100.00	1998–99	1998–99	
Manchester United †	86	29	25	32	130	114	86	23	28	35	111	127	172	52	53	67	241	241	30.23	1891–92	2024-25	(Note: Manchester United statistics include matches played against Newton Heath.)
Middlesbrough	58	37	12	9	116	62	58	9	15	34	49	116	116	46	27	43	165	178	39.66	1903–04	2016–17	
Middlesbrough Ironopolis ‡	1	1	0	0	6	1	1	0	0	1	0	2	2	1	0	1	6	3	50.00	1893–94	1893–94	
Millwall	6	5	0	1	13	6	6	3	2	1	10	8	12	8	2	2	23	14	66.67	1938–39	2001–02	
New Brighton Tower ‡	1	0	1	0	1	1	1	1	0	0	1	0	2	1	1	0	2	1	50.00	1898–99	1898–99	
Newcastle United †	88	52	20	16	179	82	88	20	19	49	103	163	176	72	39	65	282	245	40.91	1893–94	2024-25	
Newport County	1	1	0	0	5	1	1	1	0	0	3	0	2	2	0	0	8	1	100.00	1946–47	1946–47	
Northampton Town	3	1	1	1	3	2	3	0	1	2	3	6	6	1	2	3	6	8	16.67	1963–64	1998–99	
Northwich Victoria	2	1	1	0	5	3	2	2	0	0	7	1	4	3	1	0	12	4	75.00	1892–93	1893–94	
Norwich City	31	22	6	3	79	24	31	10	15	6	46	37	62	32	21	9	125	61	51.61	1938–39	2021–22	
Nottingham Forest †	49	23	18	8	87	53	49	18	9	22	67	80	98	41	27	30	154	133	41.84	1891–92	2024-25	
Notts County	29	22	4	3	63	18	29	7	8	14	26	44	58	29	12	17	89	62	50.00	1893–94	1998–99	
Oldham Athletic	21	11	4	6	35	26	21	10	5	6	33	23	42	21	9	12	68	49	50.00	1909–10	1998–99	
Oxford United	6	3	0	3	6	9	6	2	2	2	8	7	12	5	2	5	14	16	41.67	1984–85	1997–98	
Plymouth Argyle	7	4	2	1	13	10	7	2	1	4	9	11	14	6	3	5	22	21	42.86	1938–39	1988–89	
Port Vale	11	9	0	2	34	10	11	8	1	2	21	12	22	17	1	4	55	22	77.27	1892–93	1999–2000	(Note: Port Vale statistics include matches played against Burslem Port Vale.)
Portsmouth	39	26	8	5	88	44	39	11	9	19	54	65	78	37	17	24	142	109	47.44	1926–27	2009–10	
Preston North End	41	20	8	13	72	56	41	18	7	16	75	75	82	38	15	29	147	131	46.34	1896–97	2001–02	
Queens Park Rangers	23	14	6	3	45	23	23	4	10	9	20	31	46	18	16	12	65	54	39.13	1950–51	2014–15	
Reading	9	6	1	2	15	7	9	3	1	5	8	11	18	9	2	7	23	18	50.00	1926–27	2012–13	
Rotherham Town ‡	3	3	0	0	6	2	3	2	0	1	8	6	6	5	0	1	14	8	83.33	1893–94	1895–96	
Rotherham United	4	4	0	0	13	4	4	2	2	0	4	2	8	6	2	0	17	6	75.00	1963–64	2001–02	
Scunthorpe United	1	1	0	0	8	1	1	1	0	0	4	2	2	2	0	0	12	3	100.00	1963–64	1963–64	
Sheffield United	58	31	14	13	109	74	58	20	18	20	87	94	116	51	32	33	196	168	43.97	1892–93	2023–24	
Sheffield Wednesday	49	25	11	13	100	67	49	5	13	31	50	98	98	30	24	44	150	165	30.61	1891–92	2001–02	(Note: Sheffield Wednesday statistics include matches played against The Wednesday.)
Shrewsbury Town	4	2	1	1	8	5	4	2	1	1	4	2	8	4	2	2	12	7	50.00	1983–84	1988–89	
South Shields	2	1	0	1	4	2	2	1	1	0	3	2	4	2	1	1	7	4	50.00	1926–27	1927–28	
Southampton	46	23	13	10	89	54	46	15	13	18	54	59	92	38	26	28	143	113	41.30	1926–27	2024-25	
Southend United	1	1	0	0	3	0	1	1	0	0	3	2	2	2	0	0	6	2	100.00	1996–97	1996–97	
Stockport County	5	3	1	1	14	6	5	2	1	2	8	8	10	5	2	3	22	14	50.00	1902–03	2001–02	
Stoke City	49	30	12	7	91	35	49	13	11	25	51	74	98	43	23	32	142	109	43.88	1899–1900	2017–18	(Note: Stoke City statistics include matches played against Stoke.)
Sunderland †	66	43	11	12	138	83	66	20	11	35	95	111	132	63	22	47	233	194	47.73	1899–1900	2016–17	
Swansea City	17	15	1	1	46	13	17	8	3	6	32	30	34	23	4	7	78	43	67.65	1926–27	2017–18	(Note: Swansea City statistics include matches played against Swansea Town.)
Swindon Town	8	5	2	1	18	5	8	6	0	2	15	11	16	11	2	3	33	16	68.75	1963–64	1999–2000	
Tottenham Hotspur †	76	40	17	19	143	82	76	21	17	38	92	124	152	61	34	57	235	204	40.13	1909–10	2024-25	
Tranmere Rovers	4	2	1	1	9	5	4	1	3	0	11	5	8	3	4	1	20	10	37.50	1938–39	1999–2000	
Walsall	11	8	2	1	33	10	11	4	6	1	23	17	22	12	8	2	56	27	54.55	1891–92	2001–02	(Note: Walsall statistics include matches played against Walsall Town Swifts.)
Watford	12	9	1	2	31	7	12	7	2	3	28	12	24	16	3	5	59	19	66.67	1982–83	2021–22	
West Bromwich Albion	72	45	11	16	168	97	72	22	17	33	91	123	144	67	28	49	259	220	46.53	1895–96	2020–21	
West Ham United †	56	41	5	10	121	66	56	19	12	25	80	87	112	60	17	35	201	153	53.57	1923–24	2024-25	
Wigan Athletic	10	7	1	2	11	2	10	4	3	3	13	13	20	11	4	5	24	15	55.00	1998–99	2012–13	
Wimbledon ‡	10	4	4	2	12	9	10	1	3	6	6	14	20	5	7	8	18	23	25.00	1984–85	2001–02	
Wolverhampton Wanderers †	61	37	11	13	148	83	61	16	13	32	94	138	122	53	24	45	242	221	43.44	1899–1900	2024-25	
Wrexham	1	0	1	0	0	0	1	1	0	0	1	0	2	1	1	0	1	0	50.00	1998–99	1998–99	
Wycombe Wanderers	1	0	0	1	1	2	1	0	0	1	0	1	2	0	0	2	1	3	0.00	1998–99	1998–99	
York City	1	1	0	0	4	0	1	0	0	1	1	2	2	1	0	1	5	2	50.00	1998–99	1998–99	

== Overall record ==
The table that follows is accurate as of the end of the 2024–25 Premier League for all competitions. It excludes war competitions.

	T	Part	Pld	W	D	L	Win %	GF	GA	GD	Pts
National
Football League First Division	2	68	2,772	1,061	677	1,034	38.27	4,317	4,242	+75	2,837
Premier League	8	28	1,076	550	230	296	51.12	1,920	1,179	+741	1,880
Football League Second Division	7	26	973	489	213	271	50.26	1,919	1,286	+633	1,360
Football League Third Division	0	1	46	22	16	8	47.82	69	33	+36	82
Football Alliance	0	1	22	6	6	10	27.27	39	51	–12	18
Total	17	124	4,867	2,122	1,136	1,609	43.60	8,225	6,740	1,485	6,159
