= Mick McCarthy =

Association football manager and former player (born 1959)

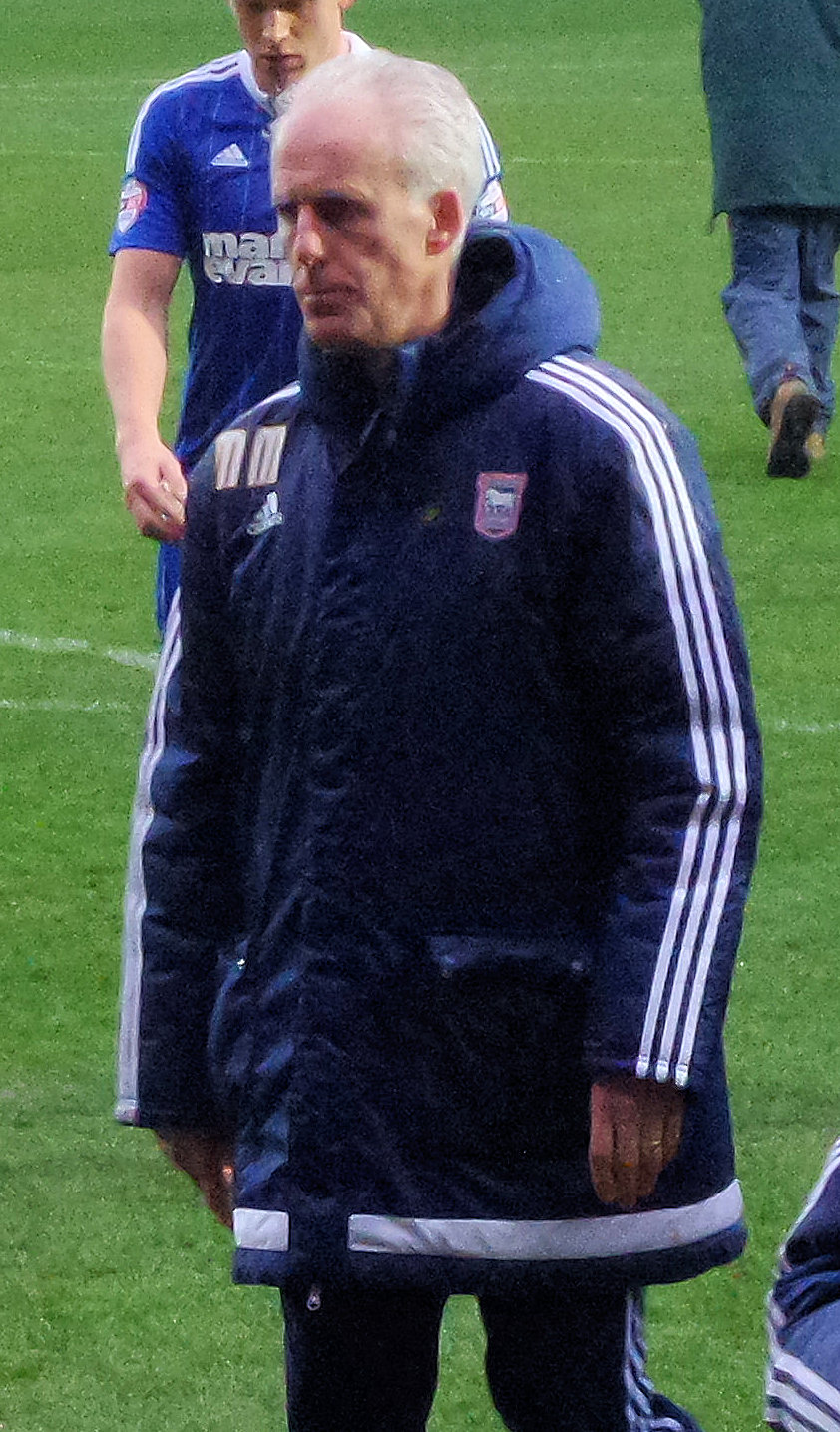
- McCarthy in 2016

Personal information
- Full name: Michael Joseph McCarthy
- Date of birth: 7 February 1959 (age 67)
- Place of birth: Barnsley, West Riding of Yorkshire, England
- Height: 6 ft 1 in (1.85 m)
- Position: Defender

Youth career
- Barnsley

Senior career*
| Years | Team | Apps | (Gls) |
| 1977–1983 | Barnsley | 272 | (7) |
| 1983–1987 | Manchester City | 140 | (2) |
| 1987–1989 | Celtic | 48 | (8) |
| 1989–1990 | Lyon | 10 | (1) |
| 1990 | → Millwall (loan) | 6 | (0) |
| 1990–1992 | Millwall | 29 | (2) |
| Total | | 505 | (20) |

International career
| 1979 | Republic of Ireland U23 | 1 | (1) |
| 1984–1992 | Republic of Ireland | 57 | (2) |

Managerial career
- 1992–1996: Millwall
- 1996–2002: Republic of Ireland
- 2003–2006: Sunderland
- 2006–2012: Wolverhampton Wanderers
- 2012–2018: Ipswich Town
- 2018–2020: Republic of Ireland
- 2020–2021: APOEL
- 2021: Cardiff City
- 2023: Blackpool
- * Club domestic league appearances and goals

Michael Joseph McCarthy (born 7 February 1959) is a professional football manager, pundit and former footballer.

McCarthy began his playing career at Barnsley in 1977 as a central defender, and he later had spells at Manchester City, Celtic, Lyon, and finally Millwall, retiring in 1992. Born and raised in England, he represented the Republic of Ireland, for whom he earned 57 caps and played at UEFA Euro 1988 and the 1990 FIFA World Cup.

McCarthy managed Millwall and then the Republic of Ireland. He guided the country to the knockout stage of the last 16 of the 2002 FIFA World Cup. He later managed Sunderland, Wolverhampton Wanderers and Ipswich Town. McCarthy began a second tenure as manager of the Republic of Ireland national team in November 2018, leaving after having guided the team to a UEFA Euro 2020 playoff place. He then had brief spells at Cypriot club APOEL, Cardiff City and Blackpool. He has also been a television pundit and commentator, including for the BBC and Virgin Media Television.

== Club career ==
=== Barnsley ===
Born in Barnsley, West Riding of Yorkshire, McCarthy made his league debut for then-Fourth Division Barnsley on 20 August 1977 in a 4–0 win over Rochdale. He spent two years in the basement league, before the club won promotion. Two years later, the team again went up to the (old) Division 2. A strong central defender, he was a virtual ever-present for his home town club, but departed in December 1983 for fellow Division 2 club Manchester City.

=== Manchester City ===
McCarthy was signed by Billy McNeill, himself a former centre-back, and was given the number 6 jersey. The Maine Road club won promotion in McCarthy's first full season and he finally had the chance to play at the highest level. His first season in the top flight was steady enough as the club reached mid-table, but relegation struck the following year. McCarthy himself would not face the drop though as he moved to Celtic in May 1987.

=== Celtic ===
He picked up his first silverware at the Scottish club as they won the league and cup double in his first season. The following season McCarthy again won a Scottish Cup winners medal, although the club had to settle for third place in the league.

=== Lyon ===
McCarthy again moved onto a new country, as he joined Lyon on a three-year contract in July 1989.

=== Millwall ===
McCarthy returned to England on loan with top-flight Millwall in March 1990. He signed permanently in May 1990 for £200,000. His appearances in the next two seasons were often limited by injuries and he effectively retired from playing when he took over as manager of the club in 1992.

== International career ==
McCarthy, the son of an Irish-born father, Charlie, is an Irish citizen since birth. He made his Irish international debut in a goalless friendly against Poland on 23 May 1984, McCarthy soon became a first-choice player and featured in all three of Ireland's games at UEFA Euro 1988. He went on to become captain, leading to the nickname "Captain Fantastic", as per the title of his autobiography.

The highlight of McCarthy's international career was the second-round penalty shoot-out win over Romania in the 1990 World Cup finals. This led to a crunch tie with hosts Italy in the quarter-final, where Ireland's first ever appearance in the finals came to an end, losing 1–0. McCarthy was the player who committed the most fouls in the 1990 tournament.

In total, McCarthy won 57 caps for the Republic of Ireland; scoring two goals, one against Yugoslavia in April 1988, the other against the United States in May 1992.

== Managerial career ==
=== Millwall ===
McCarthy became player-manager at Millwall in March 1992, succeeding Bruce Rioch. In his first full season (1992–93), he was still registered as a player, but made only one further appearance (in the Anglo-Italian Cup), before he became solely a manager.

He took the club to the play-offs in 1993–94 after a strong third-place finish, but they lost out to Derby County in the semi-finals. During the 1995–96 season, McCarthy became the prime candidate for the vacant Republic of Ireland manager's job, after the resignation of Jack Charlton. After a protracted period of speculation, McCarthy was officially appointed on 5 February 1996, two days after his resignation at the club. Despite sitting a comfortable 14 points clear from the relegation zone at the time of his departure, Millwall would go on to suffer the drop (by virtue of goals scored) after McCarthy's departure.

His loan signings of the underachieving Russian internationals Sergei Yuran and Vassili Kulkov from Spartak Moscow, who each received a £150,000 signing-on fee and were being paid five times the wage of the rest of the first team, would later be cited as one of the main reasons Millwall were eventually relegated under Jimmy Nicholl, although it cannot be proven.

=== Republic of Ireland ===
In February 1996, McCarthy became the new manager of the Republic of Ireland football team following the resignation of Jack Charlton. His first game in charge was a friendly international against Russia on 27 March which finished in a 0–2 defeat.

After two narrow failures to qualify for the 1998 World Cup and Euro 2000, McCarthy took the nation to the 2002 World Cup held in South Korea and Japan after a 2–1 play-off aggregate win against Iran. Before the tournament, McCarthy was involved in a very public and bitter spat with star player Roy Keane, who was sent home the day before it began. The conflict occurred after Keane had questioned the quality of the preparations and facilities the team were using.

Despite this furore, McCarthy's team reached the second round but were eliminated by Spain in a penalty shoot-out (after having already missed and scored a penalty in normal time). In spite of this, the Keane issue remained, with the proportion of blame undecided. Many in Ireland sided with Keane – particularly following a televised interview in which details of poor preparation were revealed – and demanded McCarthy's resignation both during and after the tournament. An independent inquiry into the organisation's handling of the squad's preparation later commissioned by the Football Association of Ireland created a damning report, leading to general secretary Brendan Menton tendering his resignation.

Criticism of McCarthy in the media became increasingly intense after a poor start to Ireland's qualifying campaign for Euro 2004. In particular, his persistence with several players and tactics that some perceived to be inadequate did him damage, as did a 4–2 away defeat to Russia and a 2–1 home defeat to Switzerland. Under mounting pressure, McCarthy resigned from the post on 5 November 2002. During his 68 games in charge, the Republic of Ireland won 29, drew 20 and lost 19.

=== Sunderland ===
On 12 March 2003, McCarthy was appointed manager of struggling Sunderland as an immediate replacement for Howard Wilkinson, who was sacked after six successive Premiership defeats left the club facing near-certain relegation. The following season, after relegation, he took Sunderland to the First Division promotion play-offs, but lost in a penalty shoot-out to Crystal Palace after Palace had scored a stoppage-time equaliser.

McCarthy completed the turnaround of the club in the 2004–05 season. The Black Cats returned to the Premier League as Football League Championship champions, amassing 94 points. After a poor season and with the club 16 points from safety with only 10 games remaining, he was dismissed on 6 March 2006.

=== Wolverhampton Wanderers ===
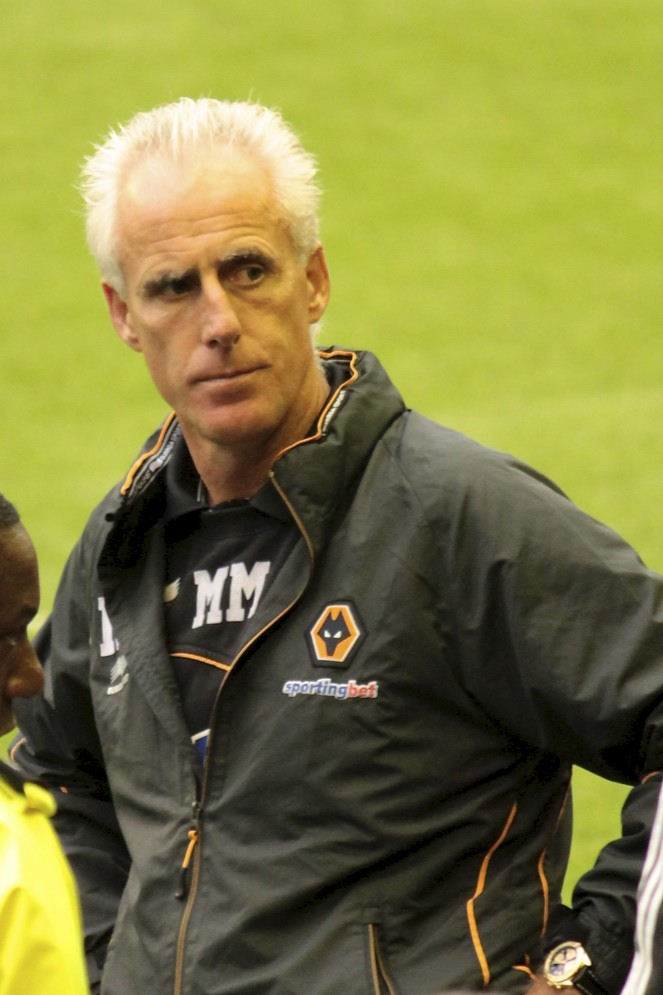
McCarthy as Wolves manager in 2011

On 21 July 2006, McCarthy was appointed manager at Championship side Wolverhampton Wanderers, replacing Glenn Hoddle who had resigned a fortnight earlier. He signed a 12-month rolling contract The team managed to make the promotion play-offs in his first season, where they lost out to local rivals West Bromwich Albion over two legs, losing 3–2 at Molineux and 1–0 at The Hawthorns.

In the 2007–08 season he took the club to within a single placing of a successive play-off finish, ending seventh, losing the coveted sixth place to Watford by a goal difference of only one. The campaign had also seen him linked with the international positions of South Korea and his previous post as Republic of Ireland manager.

The 2008–09 season started well for McCarthy as he won the August Championship Manager of the Month Award, after seeing his side reach the top of the table, eventually going on to match Wolves' record start to a season (equaling the 1949–50 season). Wolves maintained their position at the top of the table over the following months, and McCarthy again won the Manager of the Month Award for November. After maintaining top spot since October, McCarthy's Wolves secured promotion to the Premier League by beating QPR 1–0 on 18 April 2009. The following week McCarthy clinched his second Championship as a manager after a 1–1 draw at his hometown club Barnsley. He won the Championship Manager of the Season Award at the conclusion of the campaign, his side having led the table for 42 of 46 games.

The following season, McCarthy kept Wolves in the Premier League, his first success at this level in three attempts. The club assured safety with two games to spare, eventually finishing 15th, their best league finish since 1979–80, and their first ever survival in the modern Premier League. However, in the process of keeping the team in the top division, Wolves and McCarthy were fined £25,000 for fielding a weakened team for a fixture at Manchester United and thus breaking the Premier League rule E20. The Premier League also stated that the club had failed to fulfil its obligations to the league and other clubs in the utmost good faith and was therefore in breach of Rule B13.

The team spent the majority of the 2010–11 campaign mired in the relegation zone, yet managed to defeat the likes of Manchester City, Manchester United, Liverpool and Chelsea. A final day loss to Blackburn put them in danger of relegation, but results elsewhere meant they narrowly survived in 17th place, one point ahead of relegated Birmingham and Blackpool. This gave McCarthy the distinction of being the first Wolves manager in thirty years to maintain the club's top flight position for two successive seasons.

The 2011–12 season began well for McCarthy and, after three games, his team topped the Premier League with 7 points. However, results tailed off and by January they had once again entered the relegation zone after nine games without victory. That same season Wolves sold £15 million worth of players and with the board allowing McCarthy to spend just £12 million it seemed inevitable when McCarthy was sacked as Wolves manager on 13 February 2012 after a run of poor results, culminating in a 5–1 home defeat to local rivals West Bromwich Albion. The club was relegated at the end of the season with three games to spare.

=== Ipswich Town ===
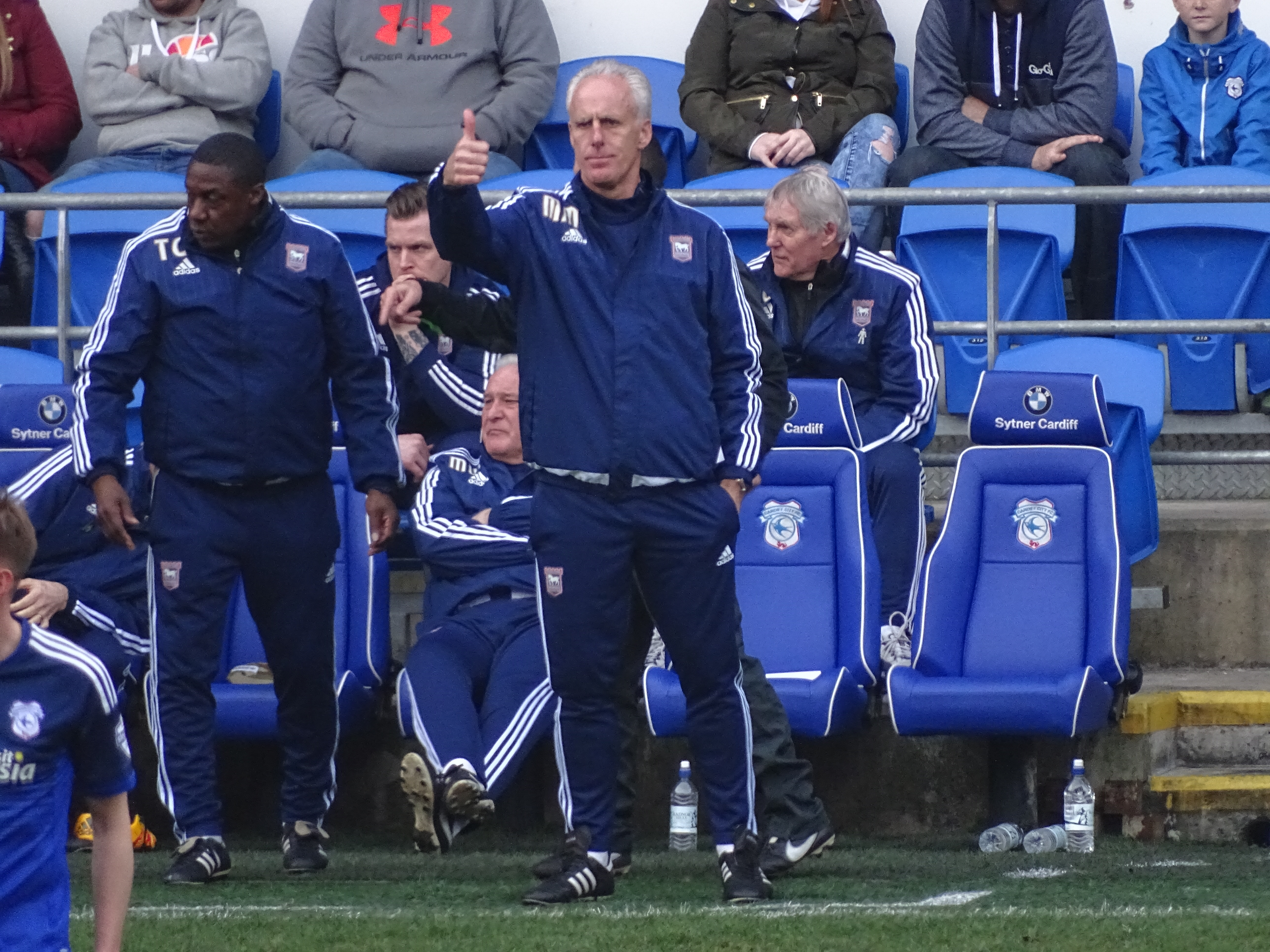
McCarthy managing Ipswich Town in 2016

On 1 November 2012, McCarthy was appointed manager at Championship side Ipswich Town on a two-and-a-half-year contract. McCarthy's appointment came in the wake of Paul Jewell's departure by mutual consent. McCarthy won his first match in charge as Ipswich manager on 3 November 2012, away at Birmingham, 0–1. This broke a 12 match winless run in the league, 13 matches in all competitions. McCarthy guided Ipswich past Burnley on 10 November – the first home win since March after a late DJ Campbell winner. The match ended 2–1. With a win against Nottingham Forest in late November, his sixth game in charge, McCarthy had successfully guided Ipswich out of the relegation zone. McCarthy's Ipswich stopped Millwall's 13-match unbeaten run with a 3–0 home win on 8 December. On 2 February 2013, McCarthy's assistant Terry Connor took charge of a 4–0 rout of Middlesbrough while McCarthy was ill. McCarthy then guided Ipswich to safety, finally finishing in 14th place. Prior to the 2013–14 season, McCarthy had signed 10 new players. McCarthy's first full season in charge of Ipswich ended with the club finishing in 9th place.

On 30 June 2014, McCarthy and Terry Connor agreed a new three-year deal with Ipswich. The following season he led the club to their first appearance in the Championship playoffs in ten years with a sixth-placed finish, before losing out to rivals Norwich City in the semi-finals. During the 2015–16 season McCarthy and assistant Terry Connor renewed their contracts for a further two seasons, with the option to extend until 2020. McCarthy led Ipswich to a 7th-place finish in his third full season at Portman Road. McCarthy's fourth full season in charge ended in a 16th-place finish.

On 29 March 2018, Ipswich Town announced that McCarthy would be leaving the club at the end of the 2017–18 season on the expiry of his contract, along with assistant manager Terry Connor, after talks with owner Marcus Evans. His final season with the club was marred by a fractured relationship between him and the club's supporters, with many supporters voicing their dissatisfaction with McCarthy's defensive style of play and McCarthy branding them as "numbskulls". He left the club earlier than expected on 10 April 2018, shortly after a 1–0 home win over Barnsley.

=== Return to the Republic of Ireland ===
On 25 November 2018, McCarthy was appointed manager of Republic of Ireland for the second time in his career, replacing Martin O'Neill. Robbie Keane, a legend for the national team, was appointed as one of McCarthy's assistant coaches, alongside Terry Connor, who had previously assisted McCarthy at both Wolverhampton Wanderers and Ipswich Town.

In March 2019, McCarthy won his first two games in charge, by defeating both Gibraltar and Georgia, in the UEFA Euro 2020 qualifiers in Group D, by 1–0. In June 2019, the national team drew 1–1 away to Denmark, before defeating Gibraltar once again, this time by 2–0, at the Aviva Stadium; four days later, McCarthy guided them to the top the Group D table, having taken ten points after four games.

On 5 September 2019, McCarthy's side once again came from behind to draw 1–1 with Switzerland, which enabled them to remain at the top of their qualifying group, with three matches to play remaining. However, a 0–0 draw in Georgia, followed by defeat in Switzerland, left Ireland needing a win at home to Denmark to secure a top two spot. A 1–1 draw saw the Irish needing to win the play-offs to qualify. On 4 April 2020, amid the global coronavirus pandemic, McCarthy stood down as manager and was immediately replaced by Stephen Kenny, who had been in charge of the nation's under-21s, for the play-offs.

=== APOEL ===
McCarthy joined Cypriot First Division club APOEL as manager on 2 November 2020; he signed a contract until 2022. He was sacked by the club on 5 January 2021 following a run of 2 wins, 1 draw and 5 defeats in his 8 games in charge.

=== Cardiff City ===
On 22 January 2021, McCarthy was appointed as manager of Cardiff City, following the sacking of Neil Harris. He signed a contract until the end of the season. His reign started with games against two of his former teams from his playing-days; Barnsley and Millwall – both of which ended as draws. His first win as Cardiff manager came in the following game, a 2–0 win against Bristol City. After making an unbeaten start to his reign at the club, a run that included a six-game winning streak, McCarthy signed a new two-year deal with the club on 4 March 2021. Cardiff finished the season in 8th place.

Despite losing just one of their opening six matches at the start of the following season, a poor run of results followed which saw Cardiff drop as low as 21st in the table. On 23 October 2021, after suffering a club-record eighth successive loss of the season at the hands of Middlesbrough, McCarthy left the club by mutual consent.

=== Blackpool ===
On 19 January 2023, McCarthy was appointed head coach of the Championship club Blackpool on a short-term contract until the end of the season. On 8 April 2023, McCarthy left Blackpool by mutual consent, following a 3–1 home defeat to Cardiff the previous day. He achieved two wins in his 14 games in charge, losing nine of them, which left the club second-bottom (where they were when he took over). "With results on the pitch not improving in recent weeks, the decision has been agreed by both parties that a change is needed," the club said in a statement.

== Personal life ==
McCarthy's father, Charles, was a native of Tallow, County Waterford, Ireland, while his mother Josephine was "a wonderful Yorkshire lady", in McCarthy's own words. McCarthy has written, "As a youngster growing up I was very aware of my Irishness. My Dad would tell us we were half-Irish".

In 2001, McCarthy encouraged those of Irish descent in Britain to select the box marked 'White Irish' for ethnicity when completing the UK census:

I believe that I am Irish, that’s why I will tick the box…I played for Ireland, I’m manager of Ireland and I’m an Irish citizen. I would encourage anyone to register as Irish if that’s what they believe they are.

McCarthy's brother-in-law is Robert Elstone, formerly chief executive of Everton.

McCarthy supports Leeds United.

== Career statistics ==
=== Club ===
Appearances and goals by club, season and competition
| Club | Season | League | | | Cup | | League Cup | | Continental | | Total | |
| Club | Season | Division | Apps | Goals | Apps | Goals | Apps | Goals | Apps | Goals | Apps | Goals |
|---|---|---|---|---|---|---|---|---|---|---|---|---|
| Barnsley | 1977–78 | Fourth Division | 46 | 1 | 2 | 0 | 2 | 1 | – | | 50 | 2 |
| Barnsley | 1978–79 | Fourth Division | 46 | 2 | 3 | 0 | 2 | 0 | – | | 51 | 2 |
| Barnsley | 1979–80 | Third Division | 44 | 1 | 2 | 0 | 4 | 0 | – | | 50 | 1 |
| Barnsley | 1980–81 | Third Division | 43 | 1 | 6 | 0 | 5 | 0 | – | | 54 | 1 |
| Barnsley | 1981–82 | Second Division | 42 | 1 | 1 | 0 | 8 | 1 | – | | 51 | 2 |
| Barnsley | 1982–83 | Second Division | 39 | 1 | 2 | 0 | 4 | 1 | – | | 45 | 2 |
| Barnsley | 1983–84 | Second Division | 12 | 0 | 0 | 0 | 1 | 0 | – | | 13 | 0 |
| Barnsley | Total | | 272 | 7 | 16 | 0 | 26 | 3 | 0 | 0 | 314 | 10 |
| Manchester City | 1983–84 | Second Division | 24 | 1 | 1 | 0 | 0 | 0 | – | | 25 | 1 |
| Manchester City | 1984–85 | Second Division | 39 | 0 | 1 | 0 | 4 | 1 | – | | 44 | 1 |
| Manchester City | 1985–86 | First Division | 38 | 0 | 4 | 0 | 3 | 0 | – | | 45 | 0 |
| Manchester City | 1986–87 | First Division | 39 | 1 | 1 | 0 | 3 | 0 | – | | 43 | 1 |
| Manchester City | Total | | 140 | 2 | 7 | 0 | 10 | 1 | 0 | 0 | 157 | 3 |
| Celtic | 1987–88 | Scottish Premier League | 22 | 3 | 6 | 0 | 3 | 0 | 0 | 0 | 31 | 3 |
| Celtic | 1988–89 | Scottish Premier League | 26 | 5 | 5 | 0 | 3 | 0 | 4 | 0 | 38 | 5 |
| Celtic | Total | | 48 | 8 | 11 | 0 | 6 | 0 | 4 | 0 | 69 | 8 |
| Olympique Lyonnais | 1989–90 | Ligue 1 | 10 | 1 | 0 | 0 | 0 | 0 | – | | 10 | 1 |
| Millwall | 1989–90 | First Division | 6 | 0 | 0 | 0 | 0 | 0 | – | | 6 | 0 |
| Millwall | 1990–91 | Second Division | 12 | 0 | 0 | 0 | 0 | 0 | – | | 12 | 0 |
| Millwall | 1991–92 | Second Division | 17 | 2 | 1 | 0 | 2 | 0 | – | | 20 | 2 |
| Millwall | Total | | 29 | 2 | 1 | 0 | 2 | 0 | 0 | 0 | 32 | 2 |
| Career total | | | 505 | 20 | 35 | 0 | 44 | 4 | 4 | 0 | 588 | 24 |

=== International ===
Republic of Ireland
| Year | Apps | Goals |
|---|---|---|
| 1984 | 4 | 0 |
| 1985 | 7 | 0 |
| 1986 | 6 | 0 |
| 1987 | 7 | 0 |
| 1988 | 9 | 1 |
| 1989 | 5 | 0 |
| 1990 | 12 | 0 |
| 1991 | 3 | 0 |
| 1992 | 4 | 1 |
| Total | 57 | 2 |

=== Managerial ===
As of match played 7 April 2023

Managerial record by team and tenure
| Team | From | To | Record | | | | | Ref(s) |
| Team | From | To | P | W | D | L | Win % | Ref(s) |
|---|---|---|---|---|---|---|---|---|
| Millwall | 18 March 1992 | 4 February 1996 | 207 | 74 | 72 | 61 | 35.75 | |
| Republic of Ireland | 1 March 1996 | 5 November 2002 | 68 | 29 | 20 | 19 | 42.65 | |
| Sunderland | 12 March 2003 | 6 March 2006 | 147 | 63 | 26 | 58 | 42.86 | |
| Wolverhampton Wanderers | 21 July 2006 | 13 February 2012 | 270 | 104 | 66 | 100 | 38.52 | |
| Ipswich Town | 1 November 2012 | 10 April 2018 | 279 | 105 | 78 | 96 | 37.63 | |
| Republic of Ireland | 25 November 2018 | 4 April 2020 | 10 | 5 | 4 | 1 | 50.00 | |
| APOEL | 2 November 2020 | 6 January 2021 | 9 | 3 | 1 | 5 | 33.33 | |
| Cardiff City | 22 January 2021 | 23 October 2021 | 38 | 14 | 11 | 13 | 36.84 | |
| Blackpool | 19 January 2023 | 8 April 2023 | 14 | 2 | 3 | 9 | 14.29 | |
| Total | | | 1,042 | 399 | 281 | 362 | 38.29 | |

== Honours ==
=== Player ===
Barnsley

- Football League Third Division runner-up: 1980–81
- Football League Fourth Division promoted: 1978–79

Manchester City

- Football League Second Division promoted: 1984–85
- Full Members' Cup runner-up: 1985–86

Celtic

- Scottish Premier League: 1987–88
- Scottish Cup: 1987–88, 1988–89

Individual

- PFA Team of the Year: 1977–78 Fourth Division, 1978–79 Fourth Division, 1980–81 Third Division, 1981–82 Second Division, 1982–83 Second Division, 1983–84 Second Division, 1984–85 Second Division
- Barnsley Player of the Year: 1977–78, 1978–79, 1980–81
- Manchester City Player of the Year: 1983–84

=== Manager ===
Sunderland

- Football League Championship: 2004–05

Wolverhampton Wanderers

- Football League Championship: 2008–09

Individual

- Philips Sports Manager of the Year: 2001
- RTÉ Sports Person of the Year: 2001
- Football League Championship Manager of the Month: March 2005, August 2008, November 2008, September 2014, November 2015, February 2021
- LMA Championship Manager of the Year: 2004–05, 2008–09
- LMA Hall of Fame: Inducted 2021

== See also ==
- List of Republic of Ireland international footballers born outside the Republic of Ireland
- List of football managers with the most matches
