= 1998–99 Manchester City F.C. season =

English football club season

Manchester City F.C.
1998–99 season
- Manager: Joe Royle
- Second Division: 3rd (promoted via playoffs)
- Play-offs: Winners
- FA Cup: Third round
- League Cup: Second round
- Top goalscorer: League: Shaun Goater (17); All: Shaun Goater (20)
- Highest home attendance: 32,471 vs York City; 8 May 1999; Division 2
- Lowest home attendance: 8,595 vs Darlington; 15 December 1998; FA Cup 2nd round
- Average home league attendance: 28,261

The 1998–99 season was Manchester City's first season in the third tier of English football.

The club made an immediate return to Division One, after a play-off final victory over Gillingham in a penalty shootout, having scored two goals in added time to turn around a 2–0 scoreline with 89 minutes of normal time played. The dramatic victory ensured that City's first season in English football's third tier ended in promotion, bringing some success to the club after two relegations in three seasons.

== Team kit ==
The team kit was produced by Kappa and the shirt sponsor was Brother.

The home shirt for the season was a darker shade of blue than the traditional City blue known as 'Laser Blue', but was still generally well received. However, the away kit was quite peculiar with bright yellow and navy blue stripes, and had never been worn by City previously. After this away kit was worn for the 1999 Football League Second Division play-off final, it took on a special significance for fans. Although this game technically marked the lowest ever league finish in Manchester City's history, conceding the first two goals of the game in the last ten minutes of normal time, followed by two goals by City in injury time and winning a penalty shoot-out, created an incredible win for City and became one of the proudest moments of the club's history.

As a result, the kit instantly went from being an average if slightly unusual shirt to being a symbol of the club's history. There have been frequent if uncoordinated calls for the shirt to be brought back as an away kit in future seasons, though as yet the design has largely been forgotten by the club's successive kit manufacturers. However, the 2024–25 away kit that is designed by Puma had brought back the yellow and navy blue stripes kit based on that season's away kit to commemorate 25 years since the Play-off final victory.

Home
Away

== Season summary ==
City's first-ever season in the third tier got off to a bright start, with the team losing only one of their first six matches and topping the table after a victory over fellow third tier newcomers Macclesfield Town. After that, however, City would only win three more league matches before Christmas, as the heavily overhauled squad struggled to come together, with injuries only compounding the situation. The club would hit its lowest ebb after an embarrassing 2–1 loss to York City in their final pre-Christmas fixture, a result which left them 12th in the table and led to fans calling for Royle's sacking.

The board kept faith with Royle, however, and were rewarded with only two more losses all season, with the highlights of the season's second half being a 3–0 win against league leaders Fulham, a 6–0 away win over Burnley, and a 4–0 win over Lincoln City, who had beaten City earlier in the season. City's poor first half of the season, combined with the form of runaway leaders Fulham and second-placed Walsall meant that an automatic promotion challenge was never seriously on the cards, but they secured third place on the final day of the season, and also exacted revenge on York City for their earlier humiliation by thrashing the Minstermen 4–0, condemning them to relegation.

City faced off against Lancashire rivals Wigan Athletic in the first round of the play-offs, and a pair of tense matches ended with a 1–1 draw in the last competitive fixture at Wigan's Springfield Park ground, followed by a 1–0 victory at Maine Road, setting the stage for a Wembley Stadium showdown with Gillingham.

The play-off final was goalless for 82 minutes, before the Gills struck a pair of late goals that looked to have ensured that City would be spending a second successive season in Division Two. However, City themselves then scored a dramatic pair of injury-time goals (the second of which came in the 95th minute) to take the match to extra time. No further goals resulted in the next half-hour, leading to a penalty shoot-out. The Gills were able to convert only one of their penalties, while City scored three, ensuring that they returned to Division One at the first time of asking.

In the FA Cup, City beat Halifax Town first, then Darlington in a replay with an extra time winner, before losing to Wimbledon by a single goal. In the League Cup, City played very well against Notts County and won the second leg 7–1, but in the next round Derby County eliminated City by a single goal at Maine Road after a draw in the first leg.

== Competitions ==
=== Second Division ===
==== League table ====
Pos	Team	Pld	W	D	L	GF	GA	GD	Pts	Qualification or relegation
1	Fulham (C, P)	46	31	8	7	79	32	+47	101	Promotion to the First Division
2	Walsall (P)	46	26	9	11	63	47	+16	87	Promotion to the First Division
3	Manchester City (O, P)	46	22	16	8	69	33	+36	82	Qualification for the Second Division play-offs
4	Gillingham	46	22	14	10	75	44	+31	80	Qualification for the Second Division play-offs
5	Preston North End	46	22	13	11	78	50	+28	79	Qualification for the Second Division play-offs

Rules for classification: 1) Points; 2) Goals scored; 3) Goal difference
(C) Champions; (O) Play-off winners; (P) Promoted

==== Results summary ====
Overall								Home						Away					
Pld	W	D	L	GF	GA	GD	Pts	W	D	L	GF	GA	GD	W	D	L	GF	GA	GD
46	22	16	8	69	33	+36	82	13	6	4	38	14	+24	9	10	4	31	19	+12

==== Matches ====
8 August 1998 1	Manchester City	3–0	Blackpool	Manchester
	Goater 26'; Bradbury 62'; Tskhadadze 76'			Stadium: Maine Road; Referee: Graham Frankland

14 August 1998 2	Fulham	3–0	Manchester City	London
	Beardsley 21'; Lehmann 32', 38'			Stadium: Craven Cottage; Referee: Mick Fletcher

22 August 1998 3	Manchester City	0–0	Wrexham	Manchester
				Stadium: Maine Road; Referee: Graham Laws

29 August 1998 4	Notts County	1–1	Manchester City	Nottingham
	Hendon 71' (pen.)		Goater 90'	Stadium: Meadow Lane; Referee: Terry Heilbron

2 September 1998 5	Manchester City	3–1	Walsall	Manchester
	Goater 30', 71'; Dickov 74'		Rammell 79'	Stadium: Maine Road; Referee: David Laws

8 September 1998 6	Manchester City	2–1	Bournemouth	Manchester
	Allsopp 25'; Dickov 64'		Fletcher 48'	Stadium: Maine Road; Referee: Trevor Jones

12 September 1998 7	Macclesfield Town	0–1	Manchester City	Macclesfield
			Goater 86'	Stadium: Moss Rose; Referee: Ken Leach

19 September 1998 8	Manchester City	1–1	Chesterfield	Manchester
	Bradbury 36'		Reeves 28'	Stadium: Maine Road; Referee: John Brandwood

26 September 1998 9	Northampton Town	2–2	Manchester City	Northampton
	Peer 30'; Corazzin 64'		Dickov 54'; Goater 88'	Stadium: Sixfields Stadium; Referee: Clive Wilkes

29 September 1998 10	Millwall	1–1	Manchester City	London
	Harris 46'		Bradbury 90'	Stadium: The Den; Referee: Matt Messias

3 October 1998 11	Manchester City	2–2	Burnley	Manchester
	Goater 8'; Allsopp 85'		Payton 34'; Cooke 54'	Stadium: Maine Road; Referee: Roger Furnandiz

12 October 1998 12	Manchester City	0–1	Preston North End	Manchester
			Parkinson 71' (pen.)	Stadium: Maine Road; Referee: Mick Fletcher

17 October 1998 13	Wigan Athletic	0–1	Manchester City	Wigan
			Goater 56'	Stadium: Springfield Park; Referee: David Pugh

20 October 1998 14	Lincoln City	2–1	Manchester City	Lincoln
	Battersby 4'; Austin 33'		Holmes 83' (o.g.)	Stadium: Sincil Bank; Referee: Paul Rejer

24 October 1998 15	Manchester City	0–1	Reading	Manchester
			Williams 56'	Stadium: Maine Road; Referee: Phil Richards

31 October 1998 16	Manchester City	2–1	Colchester United	Manchester
	Horlock 49' (pen.); Morrison 53'		Dozzell 58'	Stadium: Maine Road; Referee: Michael Pike

7 November 1998 17	Oldham Athletic	0–3	Manchester City	Oldham
			Horlock 17', 31'; Morrison 69'	Stadium: Boundary Park; Referee: Scott Mathieson

10 November 1998 18	Wycombe Wanderers	1–0	Manchester City	High Wycombe
	Simpson 34' (pen.)			Stadium: Adams Park; Referee: Paul Taylor

21 November 1998 19	Manchester City	0–0	Gillingham	Manchester
				Stadium: Maine Road; Referee: Gurnam Singh

28 November 1998 20	Luton Town	1–1	Manchester City	Luton
	Doherty 76'		Morrison 29'	Stadium: Kenilworth Road; Referee: Anthony Bates

12 December 1998 21	Manchester City	0–0	Bristol Rovers	Manchester
				Stadium: Maine Road; Referee: Roy Pearson

19 December 1998 22	York City	2–1	Manchester City	York
	Connelly 2'; Dawson 86'		Russell 33'	Stadium: Bootham Crescent; Referee: Bill Burns

26 December 1998 23	Wrexham	0–1	Manchester City	Wrexham
			Wiekens 56'	Stadium: Racecourse Ground; Referee: Trevor Jones

28 December 1998 24	Manchester City	2–1	Stoke City	Manchester
	Dickov 67'; Taylor 85'		Sigurðsson 31'	Stadium: Maine Road; Referee: Alan Butler

9 January 1999 25	Blackpool	0–0	Manchester City	Blackpool
				Stadium: Bloomfield Road; Referee: David Laws

16 January 1999 26	Manchester City	3–0	Fulham	Manchester
	Goater 24'; Taylor 32'; Horlock 54'			Stadium: Maine Road; Referee: Andy Hall

23 January 1999 27	Walsall	1–1	Manchester City	Walsall
	Watson 67'		Pollock 74'	Stadium: Bescot Stadium; Referee: Mick Pierce

29 January 1999 28	Stoke City	0–1	Manchester City	Stoke-on-Trent
			Wiekens 20'	Stadium: Britannia Stadium; Referee: Clive Wilkes

6 February 1999 29	Manchester City	3–0	Millwall	Manchester
	Dickov 61'; Cooke 71'; Horlock 75'			Stadium: Maine Road; Referee: Terry Heilbron

13 February 1999 30	Bournemouth	0–0	Manchester City	Bournemouth
				Stadium: Dean Court; Referee: Brian Coddington

20 February 1999 31	Manchester City	2–0	Macclesfield Town	Manchester
	Goater 14'; Taylor 67'			Stadium: Maine Road; Referee: Alan Wiley

27 February 1999 32	Chesterfield	1–1	Manchester City	Chesterfield
	Reeves 32'		Crooks 51'	Stadium: Saltergate; Referee: Graham Frankland

6 March 1999 33	Manchester City	0–0	Northampton Town	Manchester
				Stadium: Maine Road; Referee: Matt Messias

9 March 1999 34	Burnley	0–6	Manchester City	Burnley
			Horlock 17'; Morrison 41'; Goater 50', 59', 65'; Allsopp 82'	Stadium: Turf Moor; Referee: John Kirkby

13 March 1999 35	Manchester City	1–2	Oldham Athletic	Manchester
	Taylor 79'		Reid 27' (pen.); Duxbury 56'	Stadium: Maine Road; Referee: John Brandwood

16 March 1999 36	Manchester City	2–1	Notts County	Manchester
	Brown 16'; Cooke 40'		Stallard 72'	Stadium: Maine Road; Referee: Mike Dean

20 March 1999 37	Colchester United	0–1	Manchester City	Colchester
			Goater 55'	Stadium: Layer Road; Referee: Rob Styles

27 March 1999 38	Reading	1–3	Manchester City	Reading
	Scott 90'		Cooke 31', 62'; Goater 54'	Stadium: Madejski Stadium; Referee: Paul Rejer

3 April 1999 39	Manchester City	1–0	Wigan Athletic	Manchester
	Cooke 52'			Stadium: Maine Road; Referee: Steve Baines

5 April 1999 40	Preston North End	1–1	Manchester City	Preston
	Basham 1'		Brown 22'	Stadium: Deepdale; Referee: Kevin Lynch

10 April 1999 41	Manchester City	4–0	Lincoln City	Manchester
	Dickov 34', 45', 48'; Horlock 63'			Stadium: Maine Road; Referee: Mark Warren

14 April 1999 42	Manchester City	2–0	Luton Town	Manchester
	Dickov 4'; Vaughan 10'			Stadium: Maine Road; Referee: Phil Richards

17 April 1999 43	Gillingham	0–2	Manchester City	Gillingham
			Cooke 31'; Horlock 64'	Stadium: Priestfield Stadium; Referee: Rob Styles

24 April 1999 44	Manchester City	1–2	Wycombe Wanderers	Manchester
	Goater 45'		Baird 15'; Devine 30'	Stadium: Maine Road; Referee: Mark Cowburn

1 May 1999 45	Bristol Rovers	2–2	Manchester City	Bristol
	Roberts 83'; Cureton 88' (pen.)		Goater 27'; Cooke 42'	Stadium: Memorial Stadium; Referee: Steve Bennett

8 May 1999 46	Manchester City	4–0	York City	Manchester
	Dickov 23'; Horlock 76'; Jeff Whitley 84'; Allsopp 88'			Stadium: Maine Road; Referee: Andy D'Urso

==== Playoffs ====
===== Semi-finals =====
15 May 1999 First leg	Wigan Athletic	1–1	Manchester City	Wigan
	Barlow 1'		Dickov 76'	Stadium: Springfield Park; Referee: Alan Wiley

19 May 1999 Second leg	Manchester City	1–0	Wigan Athletic	Manchester
	Goater 27'			Stadium: Maine Road; Referee: Terry Heilbron

===== Final =====
30 May 1999 Final	Manchester City	2–2 (3–1 p)	Gillingham	London
15:00	Horlock 90'; Dickov 90+5'		Asaba 82'; R. Taylor 87'	Stadium: Wembley; Attendance: 76,935; Referee: Mark Halsey

=== FA Cup ===
==== Matches ====
13 November 1998 First Round	Manchester City	3–0	Halifax Town	Manchester
				Stadium: Maine Road

4 December 1998 Second Round	Darlington	1–1	Manchester City	Darlington

15 December 1998 Second Round replay	Manchester City	1–0 (a.e.t.)	Darlington	Manchester

2 January 1999 Third Round	Wimbledon	1–0	Manchester City	Wimbledon

=== League Cup ===
==== First round ====
11 August 1998 First Leg	Notts County	0–2	Manchester City	Nottingham

19 August 1998 Second Leg	Manchester City	7–1 (9–1 agg.)	Notts County	Manchester
				Stadium: Maine Road

==== Second round ====
16 September 1998 First leg	Derby County	1–1	Manchester City	Derby

23 September 1998 Second leg	Manchester City	0–1 (1–2 agg.)	Derby County	Manchester
				Stadium: Maine Road

== Squad ==
=== Goalkeepers ===
- (England) Nicky Weaver
- (Northern Ireland) Tommy Wright

=== Defenders ===
- (England) Lee Crooks
- (England) Richard Edghill
- (England) Nick Fenton
- (England) Richard Jobson
- (Scotland) Andy Morrison
- (Georgia (country)) Murtaz Shelia
- (Australia) Danny Tiatto
- (Georgia (country)) Kakhaber Tskhadadze
- (England) Tony Vaughan
- (Netherlands) Gerard Wiekens

=== Midfielders ===
- (England) Ian Bishop
- (England) Michael Brown
- (England) Terry Cooke
- (England) Neil Heaney
- (Scotland) Gary Mason
- (Scotland) Jamie Pollock
- (Northern Ireland) Jeff Whitley
- (Northern Ireland) Jim Whitley
- (Northern Ireland) Kevin Horlock

=== Attackers ===
- (Australia) Daniel Allsopp
- (England) Lee Bradbury
- (England) Michael Branch
- (Scotland) Paul Dickov
- (Bermuda) Shaun Goater
- (England) Chris Greenacre
- (England) Mark Robins
- (England) Craig Russell
