= Dick Finnigan =

Welsh footballer

Personal information
- Date of birth: 16 May 1904
- Place of birth: Wales
- Height: 5 ft 10 in (1.78 m)
- Position: Goalkeeper

Senior career*
Years	Team	Apps	(Gls)
1926	Manchester City	8	(0)
1929–1932	Wrexham	118	(0)

International career
1930	Wales	1	(0)
- * Club domestic league appearances and goals

Dick Finnigan (16 May 1904 – ) was a Welsh international football goalkeeper. He was part of the Wales national football team, playing 1 match on 1 February 1930 against Ireland. At club level, he played for Manchester City in 1926, playing eight matches and also played for Wrexham.

== See also ==
- List of Wales international footballers (alphabetical)
