= 1891–92 Ardwick A.F.C. season =

English football club season

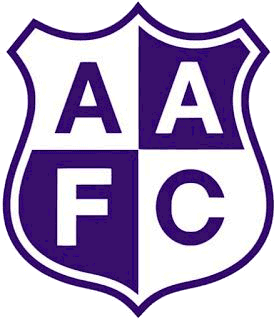
Ardwick A.F.C.
1891–92 season
- Manager: Lawrence Furniss
- Football Alliance: 8th
- FA Cup: First qualifying round
- Top goalscorer: League: Morris (10 goals); All: Morris (10 goals)
- Highest home attendance: 12,000 vs Lincoln City (28 November 1891)
- Lowest home attendance: 4,000 vs Small Heath (2 January 1892)

The 1891–92 season was Ardwick A.F.C.'s first ever season of league football, joining the Football Alliance in its third and final year of existence.

== Football Alliance ==
Pos	Team	Pld	W	D	L	GF	GA	GAv	Pts	Qualification or relegation
5	Burton Swifts (E)	22	12	2	8	54	52	1.038	26	Elected to the Football League Second Division
6	Crewe Alexandra (E)	22	7	4	11	44	49	0.898	18	Elected to the Football League Second Division
7	Ardwick (E)	22	6	6	10	39	51	0.765	18	Elected to the Football League Second Division
8	Bootle (E)	22	8	2	12	42	64	0.656	18	Elected to the Football League Second Division
9	Lincoln City (E)	22	6	5	11	37	65	0.569	17	Elected to the Football League Second Division

Rules for classification: 1) points; 2) goal average.
(E) Elected to the Football League Second Division

=== Results summary ===
Overall								Home						Away					
Pld	W	D	L	GF	GA	GD	Pts	W	D	L	GF	GA	GD	W	D	L	GF	GA	GD
22	6	6	10	39	51	-12	18	5	3	3	28	21	+7	1	3	7	11	30	-19

N.B. Points awarded for a win: 2

=== Reports ===
12 September 1891	Ardwick	3–3	Bootle	Ardwick, Manchester
	Whittle; Davies; Morris	HT: 1–0	Montgomery; Grearson	Stadium: Hyde Road; Attendance: 6,000

19 September 1891	Lincoln City	3–0	Ardwick	Lincoln
	Smallman 15' (?); Unknown 75'	HT: 1–0		Stadium: John O'Gaunts; Attendance: 2,000

26 September 1891	Ardwick	1–0	Burton Swifts	Ardwick, Manchester
	Morris	HT: 0–0		Stadium: Hyde Road; Attendance: 3,000

10 October 1891	Newton Heath	3–1	Ardwick	Clayton, Greater Manchester
	Donaldson; Farman (pen.)	HT: 2–0	Morris	Stadium: Bank Street; Attendance: 4,000

17 October 1891	Ardwick	4–3	Birmingham St George's	Ardwick, Manchester
	Morris; McWhinnie; Boggie	HT: 2–2	Matthews; W. Shore	Stadium: Hyde Road; Attendance: 6,000

7 November 1891	Ardwick	6–0	Walsall Town Swifts	Ardwick, Manchester
	Morris; Milarvie; Milne; Boggie	HT: 4–0		Stadium: Hyde Road; Attendance: 4,500

14 November 1891	Ardwick	1–3	Nottingham Forest	Ardwick, Manchester
	Milarvie	HT: 1–2	Pike; Higgins	Stadium: Hyde Road; Attendance: 8,000

19 November 1891	Nottingham Forest	4–0	Ardwick	Nottingham
	Russell (pen.); Unknown; Unknown	HT: 1–0		Stadium: Town Ground; Attendance: 2,000

21 November 1891	Burton Swifts	4–4	Ardwick	Burton
	Worrall (?); Unknown	HT: 3–3	Boggie 1' (?), 85'; Milarvie (?)	Stadium: Peel Croft; Attendance: 1,000

28 November 1891	Ardwick	2–3	Lincoln City	Ardwick, Manchester
	McWhinnie; Davies	HT: 1–2	Walker; Hodder; Moore	Stadium: Hyde Road; Attendance: 1,000

5 December 1891	Ardwick	0–4	The Wednesday	Ardwick, Manchester
		HT: 0–3	Woolhouse; Unknown; Unknown; Gemmell	Stadium: Hyde Road; Attendance: 6,000

19 December 1891	Ardwick	2–2	Newton Heath	Ardwick, Manchester
	Milne (?), 80'	HT: 1–2	Farman (?)	Stadium: Hyde Road; Attendance: 10,000

25 December 1891	Ardwick	3–1	Grimsby Town	Ardwick, Manchester
	Milarvie (?); Morris 80'	HT: 0–1	Riddoch (?)	Stadium: Hyde Road; Attendance: 6,000

26 December 1891	The Wednesday	2–0	Ardwick	Sheffield
	Thomson; Hall	HT: 1–0		Stadium: Olive Grove; Attendance: 7,000

2 January 1892	Ardwick	2–2	Small Heath	Ardwick, Manchester
	Morris	HT: 2–1	Weldon; Warton	Stadium: Hyde Road; Attendance: 5,000

23 January 1892	Bootle	2–1	Ardwick	Bootle, Merseyside
	Montgomery; Unknown (pen.)	HT: 1–1	Parry	Stadium: Hawthorne Road; Attendance: 4,000

30 January 1892	Grimsby Town	4–0	Ardwick	Grimsby
	Devlin; Unknown; Smalley; Unknown	HT: 2–0		Stadium: Abbey Park; Attendance: 2,000

20 February 1892	Small Heath	4–0	Ardwick	Small Heath, Birmingham
	Hallam; Waldon; Unknown; Unknown	HT: 2–0		Stadium: Muntz Street; Attendance: 1,000

1 March 1892	Ardwick	4–0	Crewe Alexandra	Ardwick, Manchester
	Davies; Weir; Milne (pen.)	HT: 4–0		Stadium: Hyde Road; Attendance: 2,000

5 March 1892	Birmingham St George's	0–1	Ardwick	Birmingham
		HT: 0–1	Milne	Stadium: Fentham Road; Attendance: 1,000

26 March 1892	Walsall Town Swifts	2–2	Ardwick	Walsall
	Unknown; Dixon	HT: 1–2	Davies; Weir	Stadium: Chuckery Sports Ground; Attendance: 2,000

6 April 1892	Crewe Alexandra	2–2	Ardwick	Crewe
	Lindop; Roberts	HT: 1–1	Angus; Davies	Stadium: Nantwich Road; Attendance: 2,000

== Cup competitions ==
=== FA Cup ===
3 October 1891 Q1	Newton Heath	5–1	Ardwick	Newton Heath, Manchester
	Sneddon; Farman; Doughty; Edge	HT: 1–0	Davies (penalty missed); Pearson	Stadium: North Road; Attendance: 11,000

=== Lancashire Senior Cup ===
10 February 1892	Accrington	6–0	Ardwick	Accrington
	Goal			Stadium: Accrington Cricket Club

=== Manchester Senior Cup ===
13 February 1892 First Round	Heywood Central	1–3	Ardwick	Heywood, Greater Manchester
	Unknown		Weir; Morris; Davies

12 March 1892 Semi-final	Ardwick	1–3	Fairfield	Neutral venue - Whalley Range, Manchester
	Unknown	Match ordered to be replayed	Unknown	Stadium: Brooks' Bar

2 April 1892 Semi-final replay	Ardwick	4–0	Fairfield	Neutral venue - Newton Heath, Manchester
	Davies; McWhinnie; Milne			Stadium: North Road

23 April 1892 Final	Ardwick	4–1	Bolton Wanderers	Neutral venue - Newton Heath, Manchester
	Morris; Weir; Milne	HT: 1–1	Gardiner	Stadium: North Road; Attendance: 5,000

== Friendlies ==
1 September 1891	Ardwick	2–2	West Manchester	Ardwick, Manchester
				Stadium: Hyde Road

5 September 1891	Ardwick	2–1	Gainsborough Trinity	Ardwick, Manchester
				Stadium: Hyde Road; Attendance: 5,000

7 September 1891	Ardwick	1–4	Rossendale	Ardwick, Manchester
				Stadium: Hyde Road

21 September 1891	Ardwick	3–1	Denton	Ardwick, Manchester
				Stadium: Hyde Road; Attendance: 700

28 September 1891	Ardwick	1–1	Blackburn Rovers	Ardwick, Manchester
				Stadium: Hyde Road; Attendance: 2,000

5 October 1891	Denton	0–2	Ardwick	Denton, Greater Manchester

8 October 1891	West Manchester	0–3	Ardwick	Whalley Range, Manchester
				Stadium: Brooks' Bar

24 October 1891	Ardwick	2–1	Sunderland Albion	Ardwick, Manchester
				Stadium: Hyde Road; Attendance: 5,000

31 October 1891	Ardwick	5–2	Stoke	Ardwick, Manchester
				Stadium: Hyde Road; Attendance: 4,000

2 November 1891	Chirk (Wales)	2–3	Ardwick	Chirk

12 December 1891	Ardwick	3–1	(Canada) Canadian XI	Ardwick, Manchester
				Stadium: Hyde Road

16 December 1892	Ardwick	1–0	Old Reptonians	Ardwick, Manchester
				Stadium: Hyde Road

28 December 1892	Ardwick	0–0	Sunderland	Ardwick, Manchester
				Stadium: Hyde Road

1 January 1892	Ardwick	4–2	West Bromwich Albion	Ardwick, Manchester
				Stadium: Hyde Road; Attendance: 5,000

4 January 1892	Ardwick	1–2	(Scotland) Airdrieonians	Ardwick, Manchester
				Stadium: Hyde Road

9 January 1892	Ardwick	0–3	Bolton Wanderers	Ardwick, Manchester
				Stadium: Hyde Road

16 January 1892	Ardwick	4–0	Heywood Central	Ardwick, Manchester
				Stadium: Hyde Road

6 February 1892	Ardwick	8–1	Fairfield	Ardwick, Manchester
				Stadium: Hyde Road; Attendance: 3,000

27 February 1892	Ardwick	4–0	Blackpool	Ardwick, Manchester
				Stadium: Hyde Road; Attendance: 4,000

2 March 1892	Ardwick	2–2	Heywood Central	Ardwick, Manchester
				Stadium: Hyde Road; Attendance: 1,000

16 March 1892	Ardwick	1–1	(Scotland) Third Lanark	Ardwick, Manchester
				Stadium: Hyde Road; Attendance: 1,000

19 March 1892	Ardwick	2–2	Preston North End	Ardwick, Manchester
				Stadium: Hyde Road; Attendance: 6,000

30 March 1892	Ardwick	3–3	Accrington	Ardwick, Manchester
	J. Angus (?); Morris (?) ? (?)			Stadium: Hyde Road; Attendance: 2,000

9 April 1892	Ardwick	2–2	International XI	Ardwick, Manchester
	Milarvie (?)		? (?) ? (?)	Stadium: Hyde Road

12 April 1892	Ardwick	1–2	Gorton Villa	Ardwick, Manchester
	Middleton (?)		? (?) ? (?)	Stadium: Hyde Road; Attendance: 3,000

16 April 1892	Ardwick	5–1	(Scotland) Renton	Ardwick, Manchester
	Morris (?); H. Angus (?); J. Angus (?); Davies (?)		? (?)	Stadium: Hyde Road

18 April 1892	Ardwick	3–1	Notts County	Ardwick, Manchester
	Morris (?); J. Angus (?); H. Angus (?)		? (?)	Stadium: Hyde Road

26 April 1892	Ardwick	1–1	Everton	Ardwick, Manchester
	Weir (?)		? (?)	Stadium: Hyde Road; Attendance: 2,000

30 April 1892	Ardwick	5–1	Stoke	Ardwick, Manchester
	Weir (?); J. Angus (?); Milarvie (?)		? (?)	Stadium: Hyde Road; Attendance: 2,500

== Squad statistics ==
=== Appearances and goals ===
No.	Pos	Nat	Player	Total		League		FA Cup	
No.	Pos	Nat	Player	Apps	Goals	Apps	Goals	Apps	Goals
	FW	(Scotland) SCO	Jack Angus	1	1	1	1	0	0
	DF		James/Joe Baker	1	0	1	0	0	0
	FW	(Scotland) SCO	Alec Boggie	11	6	11	6	0	0
			Cooke	9	0	9	0	0	0
			Davidson	6	0	6	0	0	0
	FW	(England) ENG	Joe Davies	23	5	22	5	1	0
	GK	(Scotland) SCO	William Douglas	23	0	22	0	1	0
	DF	(Scotland) SCO	Archibald Ferguson	4	0	3	0	1	0
	MF	(England) ENG	William Hopkins	5	0	5	0	0	0
			Jackson	10	0	10	0	0	0
			A. Jones	1	0	1	0	0	0
	DF	(Ireland) EIR	John McVicker	2	0	2	0	0	0
			McWhinnie	12	3	11	3	1	0
	MF	(England) ENG	Harry Middleton	2	0	2	0	0	0
	FW	(England) ENG	John Milne	19	5	18	5	1	0
	FW	(Scotland) SCO	Bob Milarvie	20	3	19	3	1	0
	FW	(Wales) WAL	Hugh Morris	23	10	22	10	1	0
			Neil	1	0	1	0	0	0
	DF	(Wales) WAL	Charlie Parry	11	1	11	1	0	0
			Pearson	5	1	4	0	1	1
			Powery	1	0	1	0	0	0
	FW	(England) ENG	Robert Robinson	1	0	1	0	0	0
	DF	(Scotland) SCO	David Robson	20	0	19	0	1	0
			Sharpe	7	0	7	0	0	0
	FW	(England) ENG	David Weir	18	2	18	2	0	0
	DF	(England) ENG	Danny Whittle	17	1	16	1	1	0

=== Goals record ===
Rank	No.	Nat.	Po.	Name	League	FA Cup	Total
1		(Wales)	FW	Hugh Morris	10	0	10
2		(Scotland)	FW	Alec Boggie	6	0	6
3		(England)	FW	Joe Davies	5	0	5
3		(England)	FW	John Milne	5	0	5
5		(Scotland)	FW	Bob Milarvie	3	0	3
5				McWhinnie	3	0	3
7		(England)	FW	David Weir	2	0	2
8		(Wales)	DF	Charlie Parry	1	0	1
8		(England)	DF	Danny Whittle	1	0	1
8		(Scotland)	FW	Jack Angus	1	0	1
8				Pearson	0	1	1
Total					37	1	38

== See also ==
- Manchester City F.C. seasons
