= 1964–65 Manchester City F.C. season =

English football club season

Manchester City
1964–65 season
- Manager: George Poyser (to Apr 1965); Committee (from Apr 1965)
- Stadium: Maine Road
- Second Division: 11th
- FA Cup: Third Round
- League Cup: Second Round
- Top goalscorer: League: Derek Kevan (18 goals); All: Derek Kevan (20 goals)
- Highest home attendance: 22,299 vs Bury (26 December 1964)
- Lowest home attendance: 8,015 vs Swindon Town (16 January 1965)

The 1964–65 season was Manchester City's 63rd season of competitive football and 16th season in the second division of English football. In addition to the Second Division, the club competed in the FA Cup and the Football League Cup.

This was the first season since 1948-49 without Bert Trautmann, who departed to Wellington Town.

== Second Division ==
=== League table ===
Pos	Team	Pld	W	D	L	GF	GA	GAv	Pts	Qualification or relegation
9	Derby County	42	16	11	15	84	79	1.063	43	
10	Coventry City	42	17	9	16	72	70	1.029	43	
11	Manchester City	42	16	9	17	63	62	1.016	41	
12	Preston North End	42	14	13	15	76	81	0.938	41	
13	Cardiff City	42	13	14	15	64	57	1.123	40	Qualification for the European Cup Winners' Cup first round (Note: Cardiff City qualified for the European Cup Winners' Cup as the 1964–65 Welsh Cup winners.)

Rules for classification: 1) Points; 2) Goal average; 3) Goals scored

=== Results summary ===
Overall								Home						Away					
Pld	W	D	L	GF	GA	GAv	Pts	W	D	L	GF	GA	Pts	W	D	L	GF	GA	Pts
42	16	9	17	63	62	1.016	41	12	3	6	40	24	27	4	6	11	23	38	14

=== Reports ===
Date	Opponents	H / A	Venue	Result F – A	Scorers	Attendance
22 August 1964	Charlton Athletic	A	The Valley	1 – 2	Kevan	19,299
26 August 1964	Leyton Orient	H	Maine Road	6 – 0	Murray (3), Pardoe, Oakes, Kevan	21,085
29 August 1964	Northampton Town	H	Maine Road	0 – 2		20,935
31 August 1964	Leyton Orient	A	Brisbane Road	3 – 4	Gray, Kevan, Pardoe	11,512
5 September 1964	Portsmouth	H	Maine Road	2 – 0	Murray, Kevan	16,527
9 September 1964	Norwich City	H	Maine Road	0 - 2		16,191
12 September 1964	Swindon Town	A	County Ground	1 – 0	Kevan	17,353
16 September 1964	Norwich City	A	Carrow Road	1 – 4	Gray	22,309
19 September 1964	Derby County	H	Maine Road	2 – 0	Stobart, Kevan	16,214
26 September 1964	Swansea City	A	Vetch Field	0 – 3		10,862
3 October 1964	Rotherham	H	Maine Road	2 – 1	Gray, Kevan	15,211
10 October 1964	Southampton	A	The Dell	0 – 1		18,412
14 October 1964	Newcastle United	H	Maine Road	3 – 0	Oakes, Young, Kevan	10,215
17 October 1964	Huddersfield Town	H	Maine Road	2 – 3	Kevan (2)	15,704
24 October 1964	Coventry City	A	Highfield Road	2 – 2	og, Young	28,693
31 October 1964	Cardiff City	H	Maine Road	2 – 0	Murray (2)	13,146
7 November 1964	Preston North End	A	Deepdale	5 – 2	Young (2), Kevan (3)	19,374
14 November 1964	Ipswich Town	H	Maine Road	4 – 0	Murray (2), Kevan (2)	16,835
21 November 1964	Plymouth Argyle	A	Home Park	2 – 3	Kevan, Gray	19,468
28 November 1964	Bolton Wanderers	H	Maine Road	2 – 4	Ogden, Young	21,895
5 December 1964	Middlesbrough	A	Ayresome Park	1 – 0	Kevan	13,873
19 December 1964	Northampton Town	A	County Ground	0 – 2		12,665
26 December 1964	Bury	H	Maine Road	0 – 0		22,299
28 December 1964	Bury	A	Gigg Lane	2 – 0	Kevan, Murray	11,279
2 January 1965	Portsmouth	A	Fratton Park	1 – 1	Young	12,500
16 January 1965	Swindon Town	H	Maine Road	1 – 2	Oakes	8,015
30 January 1965	Derby County	A	Baseball Ground	0 – 2		14,765
6 February 1965	Swansea City	H	Maine Road	1 – 0	Murray	11,931
13 February 1965	Rotherham United	A	Millmoor	0 – 0		10,917
20 February 1965	Southampton	H	Maine Road	3 – 1	Young, Crossan, Kennedy	10,470
27 February 1965	Huddersfield Town	A	Leeds Road	0 – 1		14,405
6 March 1965	Middlesbrough	H	Maine Road	1 – 1	Ogden	14,231
12 March 1965	Cardiff City	A	Ninian Park	2 – 2	Gray, Connor	9,094
20 March 1965	Preston North End	H	Maine Road	4 – 3	Murray, Connor, Crossan	12,884
27 March 1965	Ipswich Town	A	Portman Road	1 – 4	Crossan	12,709
3 April 1965	Plymouth Argyle	H	Maine Road	2 – 1	Oakes, Ogden	10,929
10 April 1965	Bolton Wanderers	A	Burnden Park	0 – 4		14,456
16 April 1965	Crystal Palace	H	Maine Road	0 – 2		15,885
17 April 1965	Coventry City	H	Maine Road	1 – 1	Connor	10,804
19 April 1965	Crystal Palace	A	Selhurst Park	1 – 1	Pardoe	12,175
24 April 1965	Newcastle United	A	St James Park	0 – 0		33,259
28 April 1965	Charlton Athletic	H	Maine Road	2 – 1	Murray, Young	8,409

== FA Cup ==
Date	Round	Opponents	H / A	Venue	Result F – A	Scorers	Attendance
9 January 1965	Third round	Shrewsbury Town	H	Maine Road	1 – 1	Kevan	16,131
13 January 1965	Third round replay	Shrewsbury Town	A	Gay Meadow	1 – 3	Gray	15,924

== League Cup ==
Date	Round	Opponents	H / A	Venue	Result F – A	Scorers	Attendance
23 September 1964	Third round	Mansfield Town	H	Maine Road	3 – 5	Murray, Young, Kevan	8,789
