= Kevin Austin (footballer) =

Trinidad and Tobago football player and manager

Personal information
- Full name: Kevin Levi Austin
- Date of birth: 12 February 1973
- Place of birth: Hackney, England
- Date of death: 23 November 2018 (aged 45)
- Place of death: Sheffield, England
- Height: 1.83 m (6 ft 0 in)
- Position: Defender

Senior career*
Years	Team	Apps	(Gls)
1992–1993	Saffron Walden Town	8	(0)
1993–1996	Leyton Orient	109	(3)
1996–1999	Lincoln City	128	(2)
1999–2001	Barnsley	3	(0)
2000	→ Brentford (loan)	3	(0)
2001–2002	Cambridge United	6	(0)
2001–2002	Kettering Town	3	(0)
2002–2004	Bristol Rovers	56	(0)
2004–2008	Swansea City	117	(0)
2008–2010	Chesterfield	54	(0)
2010–2011	Darlington	12	(0)
2011	→ Boston United (loan)	14	(0)
2011–2012	Boston United	25	(0)
Total		538	(5)

International career
2000–20??	Trinidad and Tobago	7	(0)
- * Club domestic league appearances and goals

Kevin Levi Austin (12 February 1973 – 23 November 2018) was a professional footballer and manager.

As a player he was a defender from 1992, until 2012. He notably played over 100 league matches each for Leyton Orient, Lincoln City and Swansea City. He also played in the English Football League for Barnsley, Brentford, Cambridge United, Bristol Rovers and Chesterfield. He also played Non-League football for Saffron Walden Town, Kettering Town, Darlington and Boston United. Born in England, he was capped seven times by the Trinidad and Tobago national team.

== Club career ==
=== Leyton Orient ===
Austin began his career at non-League Saffron Walden Town before joining Leyton Orient in August 1993 for a fee of £11,000, for whom he made 119 League and cup appearances in three seasons, scoring four goals.

=== Lincoln City ===
He moved to Lincoln City in July 1996, for a fee of £30,000, making 146 appearances. A firm favourite during his time at Sincil Bank, Kevin was voted number 56 in Lincoln's 100 league legends in June 2007.

=== Barnsley ===
Austin moved to Barnsley in July 1999 on a Bosman free transfer, but in only his fifth match for Barnsley and ironically against Lincoln in the League Cup, he suffered a serious Achilles tendon injury that kept him out of action for the remainder of the season. He only made one further appearance for Barnsley; in a League Cup tie against Rotherham United in August 2000. Returning to fitness, Austin was loaned to Brentford and also linked up with Trinidad and Tobago, making his one and only appearance for the Warriors in a 1–0 2002 World Cup qualifying win over Panama in Port of Spain in November 2000. However, he was then sidelined by a recurrence of his Achilles tendon injury picked up on international duty in the Cayman Islands. A proposed move to Oxford United in January 2001 fell through when he failed a medical and he was released by Barnsley in the summer of 2001.

=== Cambridge United ===
He linked up with his old manager John Beck at Cambridge United but continued to be bedevilled by injury and he agreed to cancel his contract with them in March 2002.

=== Kettering Town ===
He spent the remainder of the season with Kettering Town, making his debut against Folkestone on 30 March 2002 and going on to make three appearances.

=== Bristol Rovers ===
In the summer of 2002, Bristol Rovers appointed John Still as their assistant manager and Still, who had worked with Austin at Lincoln, invited him for pre-season training. Austin impressed sufficiently to earn a contract and he returned to both full fitness and regular first-team football, making a total of 61 appearances.

=== Swansea City ===
In June 2004, he moved across the Severn Bridge to Swansea City. Austin missed making his home début game for Swansea against Cheltenham on 21 August 2004 when he was caught in a traffic jam on the M4 while travelling from his Bristol home. In all competitions, to the end of the 2007/08 season, Austin made 139 appearances for Swansea City (with a further eleven as substitute).

=== Chesterfield ===
Austin moved to League Two outfit Chesterfield in June 2008 on a two-year deal.

=== Darlington ===
Austin then joined Conference Premier side Darlington after his spell at Chesterfield.

=== Boston United ===
He went on loan to Conference North club Boston United, until the end of the season 2010–11. He joined Boston on a permanent deal after being released by Darlington following the end of the season. He left the club at the end of the season.

== International career ==
He was eligible to play for either England or Trinidad and Tobago at international level and chose to play for the latter against Panama in 2000.

== Coaching career ==
In September 2016 he joined Scunthorpe United as a youth team coach.

== Style of play ==
Austin was a centre-half who was also utilised as a full-back. Standing at 6'1", he was an imposing figure, dubbed "The Doorman".

== Death ==
Austin was diagnosed with pancreatic cancer in April 2017. He died on 23 November 2018, aged 45.

== Honours ==
Swansea City

- Football League One: 2007–08
- Football League Trophy: 2005–06
