= 1963–64 Manchester City F.C. season =

English football club season

Manchester City
1963–64 season
- Manager: George Poyser
- Stadium: Maine Road
- Second Division: 6th
- FA Cup: Third Round
- League Cup: Semi-finals
- Top goalscorer: League: Derek Kevan (31); All: Derek Kevan (36)
- Highest home attendance: 31,136 vs Sunderland (18 January 1964)
- Lowest home attendance: 8,053 vs Middlesbrough (17 March 1964)

The 1963–64 season was Manchester City's 62nd season of competitive football and 15th season in the second division of English football. In addition to the Second Division, the club competed in the FA Cup and the Football League Cup.

== Second Division ==
=== League table ===
Pos	Team	Pld	W	D	L	GF	GA	GAv	Pts
4	Charlton Athletic	42	19	10	13	76	70	1.086	48
5	Southampton	42	19	9	14	100	73	1.370	47
6	Manchester City	42	18	10	14	84	66	1.273	46
7	Rotherham United	42	19	7	16	90	78	1.154	45
8	Newcastle United	42	20	5	17	74	69	1.072	45

Rules for classification: 1) Points; 2) Goal average; 3) Goals scored

=== Results summary ===
Overall								Home						Away					
Pld	W	D	L	GF	GA	GAv	Pts	W	D	L	GF	GA	Pts	W	D	L	GF	GA	Pts
42	18	10	14	84	66	1.273	46	12	4	5	50	27	28	6	6	9	34	39	18

=== Reports ===
Date	Opponents	H / A	Venue	Result F – A	Scorers	Attendance
24 August 1963	Portsmouth	H	Maine Road	0 – 2		21,822
28 August 1963	Cardiff City	A	Ninian Park	2 – 2	Hannah, Kevan	25,352
31 August 1963	Rotherham United	A	Millmoor	2 – 1	Kevan (2)	11,418
4 September 1963	Cardiff City	H	Maine Road	4 – 0	Aimson (2), Kevan, Young	22,138
7 September 1963	Leeds United	H	Maine Road	3 – 2	Young, Hannah, Kevan	29,186
10 September 1963	Swindon Town	A	County Ground	0 - 3		28,291
14 September 1963	Sunderland	A	Roker Park	0 – 2	Kevan	38,298
18 September 1963	Swindon Town	H	Maine Road	0 – 0		23,103
21 September 1963	Northampton Town	H	Maine Road	3 – 0	Wagstaffe, Young, Oakes	21,340
28 September 1963	Bury	A	Gigg Lane	1 – 1	Hodgkinson	18,032
5 October 1963	Charlton Athletic	H	Maine Road	1 – 3	Gray	16,138
9 October 1963	Plymouth Argyle	H	Maine Road	1 – 1	Cunliffe	13,456
12 October 1963	Grimsby Town	A	Blundell Park	1 – 1	Walker (og)	9,754
19 October 1963	Preston North End	H	Maine Road	2 – 3	Aimson, Kevan	23,153
26 October 1963	Derby County	A	Baseball Ground	3 – 1	Oakes, Young, Aimson	15,675
2 November 1963	Swansea City	H	Maine Road	1 – 0	Oakes	16,770
9 November 1963	Southampton	A	The Dell	2 – 4	Kevan, Murray	17,412
23 November 1963	Newcastle United	A	St James’ Park	1 – 3	Gray	21,200
30 November 1963	Huddersfield Town	H	Maine Road	5 – 2	Kevan (2), Murray (2), Gray	16,192
7 December 1963	Leyton Orient	A	Brisbane Road	2 – 0	Kevan, Murray	9,610
14 December 1963	Portsmouth	A	Fratton Park	2 – 2	Kevan, Murray	13,206
21 December 1963	Rotherham United	H	Maine Road	6 – 1	Murray (3), Kevan (2), Young	11,060
26 December 1963	Scunthorpe United	H	Maine Road	8 – 1	Murray (3), Gray (3), Kevan (2)	26,365
28 December 1963	Scunthorpe United	A	Glanford Park	4 – 2	Murray (2), Kevan, Wagstaffe	9,085
11 January 1964	Leeds United	A	Elland Road	0 – 1		33,737
18 January 1964	Sunderland	H	Maine Road	0 – 3		31,136
1 February 1964	Northampton Town	A	County Ground	1 – 2	Kevan	12,330
8 February 1964	Bury	H	Maine Road	1 – 1	Dowd	14,698
15 February 1964	Charlton Athletic	A	The Valley	3 – 4	Frost, Gray, Kevan	18,961
22 February 1964	Grimsby Town	A	Maine Road	0 – 4		11,411
29 February 1964	Middlesbrough	A	Ayresome Park	2 – 2	Kevan, Gray	12,763
7 March 1964	Derby County	H	Maine Road	3 – 2	Kevan (2), Murray	11,908
14 March 1964	Plymouth Argyle	A	Home Park	1 – 2	Kevan	11,761
17 March 1964	Middlesbrough	H	Maine Road	1 – 0	Kevan	8,053
21 March 1964	Southampton	H	Maine Road	1 – 1	Murray	13,481
27 March 1964	Norwich City	H	Maine Road	5 – 0	Kevan (3), Wagstaffe, Murray	20,212
28 March 1964	Preston North End	A	Deepdale	0 – 2		24,796
30 March 1964	Norwich City	A	Carrow Road	2 – 1	Murray, Shawcross	17,842
4 April 1964	Newcastle United	H	Maine Road	3 – 1	Kevan (2), Murray	15,450
11 April 1964	Huddersfield Town	A	Leeds Road	2 – 0	Pardoe, Murray	13,250
18 April 1964	Leyton Orient	H	Maine Road	2 – 0	Murray, Kevan	15,144
25 April 1964	Swansea City	A	Vetch Field	3 – 3	Pardoe, Murray, Kevan	10,862

== FA Cup ==
=== Results ===
Date	Round	Opponents	H / A	Venue	Result F – A	Scorers	Attendance
4 January 1964	3rd Round	Swindon Town	A	County Ground	1-2	Oakes	18,065

== League Cup ==
=== Results ===
Date	Round	Opponents	H / A	Venue	Result F – A	Scorers	Attendance
25 September 1963	2nd Round	Carlisle United	H	Maine Road	2-0	Aimson, Kevan	8,265
16 October 1963	3rd Round	Hull City	A	Boothferry Park	3-0	Aimson, Kevan, Young	13,880
27 November 1963	4th Round	Leeds United	H	Maine Road	3-1	Kevan, Gray	10,984
17 December 1963	5th Round	Notts County	A	Meadow Lane	1-0	Kevan	7,330
15 January 1964	Semi Final 1st leg	Stoke City	A	Victoria Ground	0-2		21,019
5 February 1964	Semi Final 2nd leg	Stoke City	H	Maine Road	1-0	Kevan	16,894
