= 1938–39 Manchester City F.C. season =

English football club season

Manchester City
1938–39 season
- Manager: Wilf Wild
- Stadium: Maine Road
- Second Division: 5th
- FA Cup: Fourth round
- Top goalscorer: League: Alec Herd (19); All: Alec Herd (22)
- Highest home attendance: 47,998 vs Tottenham Hotspur; 5 November 1938
- Lowest home attendance: 18,671 vs West Ham United; 7 September 1938

The 1938–39 season was Manchester City's 44th season in existence and 12th season in the Second Division of English football. In addition to the domestic league, the club competed in the FA Cup.

== Second Division ==
=== League table ===
Pos	Team	Pld	W	D	L	GF	GA	GAv	Pts
3	Sheffield Wednesday	42	21	11	10	88	59	1.492	53
4	Coventry City	42	21	8	13	62	45	1.378	50
5	Manchester City	42	21	7	14	96	72	1.333	49
6	Chesterfield	42	20	9	13	69	52	1.327	49
7	Luton Town	42	22	5	15	82	66	1.242	49

Rules for classification: 1) Points; 2) Goal average; 3) Goals scored

=== Results summary ===
Overall								Home						Away					
Pld	W	D	L	GF	GA	GAv	Pts	W	D	L	GF	GA	Pts	W	D	L	GF	GA	Pts
42	21	7	14	96	72	1.333	49	13	3	5	56	35	29	8	4	9	40	37	20

=== Reports ===
Date	Opponents	H / A	Venue	Result F – A	Scorers	Attendance							
27 August 1938	Swansea City	H	Maine Road	5 - 0	Herd (2), Doherty (2), Howe	30,889							
29 August 1938	Chesterfield	A	Saltergate	3 – 0	Howe (2), Brook	16,000							
3 September 1938	Bradford Park Avenue	A	Park Avenue	2 – 4	Herd, Brook	16,000							
7 September 1938	West Ham United	H	Maine Road	2 – 4	Howe, Herd	18,671							
10 September 1938	Luton Town	H	Maine Road	1 - 2	Howe	29,627							
17 September 1938	Millwall	H	Maine Road	1 – 6	Bray	27,437							
24 September 1938	Blackburn Rovers	A	Ewood Park	3 – 3	Herd, Heale, McDowall	26,457							
1 October 1938	Fulham	H	Maine Road	3 - 5	McDowall (2), Barr	25,000							
8 October 1938	Sheffield Wednesday	A	Hillsborough Stadium	1 – 3	Brook	25,000							
15 October 1938	Plymouth Argyle	A	Home Park	0 – 0		24,710							
22 October 1938	Sheffield Wednesday	H	Maine Road	3 – 2	Toseland, Milsom, Brook	29,848							
29 October 1938	West Bromwich Albion	A	The Hawthorns	1 – 3	Milsom	22,274							
5 November 1938	Tottenham Hotspur	H	Maine Road	2 – 0	Milsom, Doherty	47,998							
12 November 1938	Southampton	A	The Dell	2 - 1	Milsom, Brook	23,104							
19 November 1938	Coventry City	H	Maine Road	3 – 0	Doherty (3), Herd	38,713							
26 November 1938	Nottingham Forest	A	City Ground	4 – 3	Brook (3), Herd	15,727							
3 December 1938	Newcastle United	H	Maine Road	4 – 1	Herd (2), Milsom (2)	45,000							
10 December 1938	Burnley	A	Turf Moor	1 – 1	Milsom	24,096							
17 December 1938	Norwich City	H	Maine Road	4 – 1	Doherty (2), Herd (2)	17,907							
24 December 1938	Swansea City	A	Vetch Field	0 – 2		15,000							
26 December 1938	Tranmere Rovers	A	Prenton Park	9 – 3	Milsom (4), Toseland (2), Doherty (2), Herd	14,000							
27 December 1938	Tranmere Rovers	H	Maine Road	5 – 2	Milsom (3), Doherty, Pritchard	43,994							
31 December 1938	Bradford Park Avenue	H	Maine Road	5 – 1	Herd (3), Milsom, Pritchard	32,033							
14 January 1939	Luton Town	A	Kenilworth Road	0 – 3		16,000							
28 January 1939	Blackburn Rovers	H	Maine Road	3 – 2	Heale (2), Doherty	47,089							
4 February 1939	Fulham	A	Craven Cottage	1 – 2	(og)	24,366							
18 February 1939	Plymouth Argyle	H	Maine Road	1 - 3	Brook	28,784							
25 February 1939	Sheffield United	A	Bramhall Lane	0 – 1		40,000							
4 March 1939	West Bromwich Albion	H	Maine Road	3 – 3	Herd, Doherty, Brook	18,479							
11 March 1939	Tottenham Hotspur	A	White Hart Lane	3 – 2	Sproston (2), Freeman	27,428							
13 March 1939	Millwall	A	The Den	1 – 3	Dunkley	14,000							
18 March 1939	Southampton	H	Maine Road	2 – 1	McLeod, McDowall	18,000							
25 March 1939	Coventry City	A	Highfield Road	1 – 0	Heale	20,088							
1 April 1939	Nottingham Forest	H	Maine Road	3 – 0	Herd (2), Pritchard	24,578							
7 April 1939	Bury	A	Gigg Lane	5 – 1	Heale (2), Herd, Doherty, Brook	24,520							
8 April 1939	Newcastle United	A	St James’ Park	2 – 0	Heale (2)	23,000							
10 April 1939	Bury	H	Maine Road	0 – 0		36,816							
15 April 1939	Burnley	H	Maine Road	2 – 0	Doherty (2)	19,230							
22 April 1939	Norwich City	A	Carrow Road	0 – 0		12,000							
26 April 1939	Sheffield Wednesday	H	Maine Road	1 – 1	Pritchard	24,244	29 April 1939	Chesterfield	H	Maine Road	3 – 1	Herd, Heale, McLeod	12,258
6 May 1939	West Ham United	A	Boleyn Ground	1 – 2	Heale	30,000							

== FA Cup ==
=== Reports ===
Date	Round	Opponents	H / A	Venue	Result F – A	Scorers	Attendance
12 January 1939	Third round	Norwich City	A	Carrow Road	5 - 0	Herd (2), Milsom, Doherty	20,901
21 January 1939	Fourth round	Sheffield United	A	Bramhall Lane	0 – 2		49,795
