= 1946–47 Manchester City F.C. season =

English football club season

Manchester City
1946–47 season
- Manager: Wilf Wild (to 1 Dec 1946); Sam Cowan (from 2 Dec 1946)
- Stadium: Maine Road
- Second Division: 1st (promoted)
- FA Cup: Fifth Round
- Top goalscorer: League: George Smith (23); All: George Smith (23)
- Highest home attendance: 67,672 vs Burnley; 10 May 1947
- Lowest home attendance: 22,210 vs Barnsley; 14 December 1946
- Average home league attendance: 38,195

The 1946–47 season was Manchester City's 45th season of competitive football and 13th season in the second division of English football. In addition to the Second Division, the club competed in the FA Cup. Whilst top of the league, almost 70,000 fans packed Maine Road to watch City play second placed Burnley in a First Division promotion decider, therefore also being a big step towards the title for City. It is likely to be the highest ever attended match outside the top flight in English history.

== Second Division ==
=== League table ===
Pos	Team	Pld	W	D	L	GF	GA	GAv	Pts	Qualification or relegation
1	Manchester City (C, P)	42	26	10	6	78	35	2.229	62	Promotion to the First Division
2	Burnley (P)	42	22	14	6	65	29	2.241	58	Promotion to the First Division
3	Birmingham City	42	25	5	12	74	33	2.242	55	
4	Chesterfield	42	18	14	10	58	44	1.318	50	
5	Newcastle United	42	19	10	13	95	62	1.532	48	

Rules for classification: 1) Points; 2) Goal average; 3) Goals scored
(C) Champions; (P) Promoted

=== Results summary ===
Overall								Home						Away					
Pld	W	D	L	GF	GA	GAv	Pts	W	D	L	GF	GA	Pts	W	D	L	GF	GA	Pts
42	26	10	6	78	35	2.229	62	17	3	1	49	14	37	9	7	5	29	21	25

=== Reports ===
Date	Opponents	H / A	Venue	Result F – A	Scorers	Attendance
31 August 1946	Leicester City	A	Filbert Street	3 – 0	McDowall, Walsh, Jackson	20,000
4 September 1946	Bury	H	Maine Road	3 – 1	Dunkley, Black, Smith	28,000
7 September 1947	Chesterfield	H	Maine Road	0 – 0		47,319
14 September 1946	Millwall	A	The Dell	3 – 1	Constantine (3)	30,000
18 September 1946	Bury	A	Gigg Lane	2 – 2	Herd (2)	11,000
21 September 1946	Bradford Park Avenue	H	Maine Road	7 - 2	Black (3), Smith (2), Constantine, Sproston	38,330
28 September 1946	Tottenham Hotspur	A	White Hart Lane	0 – 0		55,253
5 October 1946	West Ham United	A	Boleyn Ground	0 – 1		32,000
12 October 1946	Sheffield Wednesday	H	Maine Road	2 – 1	Herd, Constantine	36,413
19 October 1946	Swansea City	H	Maine Road	1 – 1	Sproston	34,436
26 October 1946	Newcastle United	A	St James’ Park	2 – 3	Black, Westwood	65,798
2 November 1946	West Bromwich Albion	H	Maine Road	5 – 0	Black (3), Dunkley, Herd	38,821
9 November 1946	Birmingham City	A	St Andrews	1 – 3	Smith	30,000
16 November 1946	Coventry City	H	Maine Road	1 – 0	Dunkley	25,569
23 November 1946	Nottingham Forest	A	Meadow Lane	1 – 0	Smith	22,000
30 November 1946	Southampton	H	Maine Road	1 – 1	Constantine	24,867
7 December 1946	Newport County	A	Somerton Park	3 – 0	Dunkley, Black, Constantine	15,000
14 December 1946	Barnsley	H	Maine Road	5 – 1	Constantine (2), Smith (2), (og)	22,210
21 December 1946	Burnley	A	Turf Moor	0 – 0		35,000
25 December 1946	Plymouth Argyle	H	Maine Road	4 – 3	Smith (2), Herd, Constantine	24,532
26 December 1946	Plymouth Argyle	A	Home Park	3 – 2	Smith, Constantine, (og)	27,000
28 December 1946	Leicester City	H	Maine Road	1 – 0	Constantine	43,910
1 January 1947	Fulham	H	Maine Road	4 – 0	Herd (2), Black (2)	47,658
4 January 1947	Chesterfield	A	Saltergate	1 – 0	Jackson	20,000
18 January 1947	Millwall	H	Maine Road	1 – 0	Capel	36,635
1 February 1947	Tottenham Hotspur	H	Maine Road	1 – 0	Westwood	39,000
22 February 1947	Swansea City	A	Vetch Field	2 – 1	Herd, Smith	26,584
1 March 1947	Fulham	A	Craven Cottage	2 – 2	Smith, Herd	32,120
15 March 1947	Birmingham City	H	Maine Road	1 – 0	Smith	59,535
22 March 1947	Coventry City	A	Highfield Road	1 – 1	Smith	26,629
29 March 1947	Nottingham Forest	H	Maine Road	2 – 1	Smith, Wharton	26,354
4 April 1947	Luton Town	H	Maine Road	2 – 0	Woodroffe, Smith	57,592
5 April 1947	Southampton	A	The Dell	1 – 0	Smith	25,000
7 April 1947	Luton Town	A	Kenilworth Road	0 – 0		24,000
19 April 1947	Barnsley	A	Oakwell	2 – 0	McDowall, Black	26,274
2 May 1947	Newcastle United	H	Maine Road	0 – 2		46,972
10 May 1947	Burnley	H	Maine Road	1 – 0	Herd	67,672
14 May 1947	Bradford Park Avenue	A	Park Avenue	1 – 1	Smith	15,162
24 May 1947	West Ham United	H	Maine Road	2 – 0	McDowall, Smith	31,980
26 May 1947	Sheffield Wednesday	A	Hillsborough	0 – 1		30,000
31 May 1947	West Bromwich Albion	A	The Hawthorns	1 – 3	Black	25,000
14 June 1947	Newport County	H	Maine Road	5 – 1	Smith (5)	24,300

== FA Cup ==
=== Results ===
Date	Round	Opponents	H / A	Venue	Result F – A	Scorers	Attendance
11 January 1947	Third Round	Gateshead	H	Maine Road	3 - 0	Jackson, Capel, Westwood	38,578
25 January 1947	Fourth Round	Bolton Wanderers	A	Burnden Park	3 - 3	Black (2), Capel	41,286
29 January 1947	Fourth Round Replay	Bolton Wanderers	H	Maine Road	1 - 0	Westwood	39,355
7 February 1947	Fifth Round	Birmingham City	A	St Andrews	0 - 5		50,000
