= Hugh Morris (footballer, born 1872) =

Welsh footballer

Personal information
- Full name: Hugh Morris
- Date of birth: 1872
- Place of birth: Chirk, Wales
- Date of death: 20 September 1897 (aged 25)
- Place of death: Chirk, Wales
- Position: Inside right

Youth career
- 1888–1891: Chirk

Senior career*
Years	Team	Apps	(Gls)
1891–1893	Ardwick	50	(22)
1893–1895	Sheffield United	39	(9)
1895–1896	Manchester City	20	(9)
1896–1897	Grimsby Town		
1897	Millwall Athletic	0	(0)

International career
1894–1897	Wales	3	(2)
- * Club domestic league appearances and goals

Hugh Morris (1872 – 20 September 1897) was a Welsh footballer who played as a forward for Manchester City, Sheffield United and Grimsby Town in the 19th century. Born in Chirk, Wales, he gained three caps for the Welsh national team.

== Career ==
=== Club career ===
Morris was first spotted by Ardwick when playing for Chirk in the Welsh cup and the Manchester side duly signed him in 1891. Morris was the leading goalscorer for the club in the 1891–92 Football Alliance season, scoring 10 goals in 22 appearances, including a hat-trick against Walsall Town Swifts. The following season Ardwick were admitted to the newly formed Football League Second Division and Morris played in the club's first ever Football League fixture, scoring twice as Ardwick beat Bootle 7–0. Morris continued to play regularly for Ardwick before he was transferred to Sheffield United, then of the First Division in December 1893. He became a regular in United's first team for the following 18 months, having rejected an offer to play in the United States in 1894, and made 39 league appearances, scoring nine goals for the Yorkshire club. In September 1895 Morris was suspended for "lodging in a public house" (the club was run on strict Methodist lines at the time and this was against the terms of his contract), before being transferred back to Ardwick, now renamed Manchester City, in the following November along with Joe Davies and Bob Hill. Returning to Hyde Road, Morris made 20 appearances in his second spell at the Manchester club, before moving to Grimsby Town in May 1896 where he played for a further season. Morris moved to Southern League side Millwall in the summer of 1897, but contracted tuberculosis not long after his transfer and died before he could make his debut.

=== International career ===
While at Sheffield United, Morris won his first cap for Wales in a British Home Championship match against Scotland on 24 March 1894. Morris scored twice, but Wales lost 5–2. Morris gained a second international cap in a 9–1 defeat to England in March 1896 and earned the last of his three international caps in March 1897, a 4–0 defeat against England at his former club ground Bramall Lane.
