= 1948–49 Manchester City F.C. season =

English football club season

Manchester City
1948–49 season
- Manager: Jock Thomson
- Stadium: Maine Road
- First Division: 7th
- FA Cup: Third Round
- Top goalscorer: League: George Smith (12); All: George Smith (12)
- Highest home attendance: 64,592 vs Manchester United; 11 September 1948
- Lowest home attendance: 16,502 vs Sheffield United; 5 March 1949

The 1948–49 season was Manchester City's 47th season of competitive football and 33rd season in the top division of English football. In addition to the First Division, the club competed in the FA Cup.

== First Division ==
=== League table ===
Pos	Team	Pld	W	D	L	GF	GA	GAv	Pts
5	Arsenal	42	18	13	11	74	44	1.682	49
6	Wolverhampton Wanderers	42	17	12	13	79	66	1.197	46
7	Manchester City	42	15	15	12	47	51	0.922	45
8	Sunderland	42	13	17	12	49	58	0.845	43
9	Charlton Athletic	42	15	12	15	63	67	0.940	42

Source: World Football
Rules for classification: 1) Points; 2) Goal average; 3) Goals scored

=== Results summary ===
Overall								Home						Away					
Pld	W	D	L	GF	GA	GAv	Pts	W	D	L	GF	GA	Pts	W	D	L	GF	GA	Pts
42	15	15	12	47	51	0.922	45	10	8	3	28	21	28	5	7	9	19	30	17

Source: "Manchester City - Fixtures & Results 1948/1949". worldfootball.net.

=== Reports ===
Date	Opponents	H / A	Venue	Result F – A	Scorers	Attendance
21 August 1948	Burnley	A	Turf Moor	0 – 1		28,000
25 August 1948	Preston North End	H	Maine Road	3 – 2	Sproston, McDowall, McMorran	45,000
28 August 1948	Stoke City	H	Maine Road	0 – 0		42,450
1 September 1948	Preston North End	A	Deepdale	3 – 1	Black, Godwin, Linacre	35,000
4 September 1948	Charlton Athletic	A	The Valley	2 – 3	Godwin (2)	45,000
8 September 1948	Birmingham City	H	Maine Road	1 - 0	Black	26,841
11 September 1948	Manchester United	H	Maine Road	0 – 0		64,502
15 September 1948	Birmingham City	A	St Andrews	1 – 4	Smith	40,000
18 September 1948	Portsmouth	H	Maine Road	1 – 1	McMorran	48,376
25 September 1948	Newcastle United	A	St James’ Park	0 – 0		58,000
2 October 1948	Middlesbrough	H	Maine Road	1 – 0	Oakes	42,000
9 October 1948	Sheffield United	A	Bramhall Lane	2 - 0	Oakes, Black	26,000
16 October 1948	Aston Villa	H	Maine Road	4 – 1	Smith (3), Oakes	38,024
23 October 1948	Sunderland	A	Roker Park	0 – 3		46,879
30 October 1948	Wolverhampton Wanderers	H	Maine Road	3 – 3	Oakes, Black, Linacre	44,130
6 November 1948	Bolton Wanderers	A	Burnden Park	1 – 5	Smith	37,931
13 November 1948	Liverpool	H	Maine Road	2 – 4	Black, Clarke	21,659
20 November 1948	Blackpool	A	Bloomfield Road	1 – 1	Smith	28,000
27 November 1948	Derby County	H	Maine Road	2 – 1	Black, Clarke	42,225
4 December 1948	Arsenal	A	Highbury	1 – 1	Oakes	45,000
11 December 1948	Huddersfield Town	H	Maine Road	3 – 1	Clarke (2), Emptage	37,717
18 December 1948	Burnley	H	Maine Road	2 – 2	Smith, (og)	30,000
25 December 1948	Everton	A	Goodison Park	0 – 0		45,000
27 December 1948	Everton	H	Maine Road	0 – 0		30,000
1 January 1949	Stoke City	A	Victoria Ground	3 – 2	Smith (2), Clarke	25,000
15 January 1949	Charlton Athletic	H	Maine Road	0 – 1		20,000
22 January 1949	Manchester United	H	Maine Road	0 – 0		66,485
5 February 1949	Portsmouth	A	Fratton Park	1 – 3	Smith	34,167
19 February 1949	Newcastle United	H	Maine Road	1 – 0	Black	48,624
26 February 1949	Middlesbrough	A	Ayresome Park	1 - 0	Black	35,000
5 March 1949	Sheffield United	H	Maine Road	1 – 0	Black	16,502
12 March 1949	Aston Villa	A	Villa Park	0 – 1		35,000
19 March 1949	Blackpool	H	Maine Road	1 – 1	Hart	35,857
26 March 1949	Derby County	A	Baseball Ground	0 – 2		29,125
2 April 1949	Bolton Wanderers	H	Maine Road	1 – 0	Black	28,000
9 April 1949	Liverpool	A	Anfield	1 – 0	Smith	31,389
15 April 1949	Chelsea	H	Maine Road	1 – 0	Smith	36,554
16 April 1949	Sunderland	H	Maine Road	1 – 1	Clarke	31,345
18 April 1949	Chelsea	A	Stamford Bridge	1 – 1	Munro	25,864
23 April 1949	Wolverhampton Wanderers	A	Molineux Stadium	1 – 1	Black	45,000
27 April 1949	Arsenal	H	Maine Road	0 – 3		38,155
7 May 1949	Huddersfield Town	A	Leeds Road	0 – 1		27,507

== FA Cup ==
=== Results ===
Date	Round	Opponents	H / A	Venue	Result F – A	Scorers	Attendance
8 January 1949	Third Round	Everton	A	Goodison Park	0 - 1		63,459
