= 1950–51 Manchester City F.C. season =

English football club season

Manchester City
1950–51 season
- Manager: Les McDowall
- Stadium: Maine Road
- Second Division: 2nd (promoted)
- FA Cup: Third Round
- Top goalscorer: League: Dennis Westcott (25); All: Dennis Westcott (25)
- Highest home attendance: 45,693 vs Hull City; 28 October 1950
- Lowest home attendance: 10,000 vs Swansea; 14 March 1951

The 1950–51 season was Manchester City's 49th season of competitive football and 14th season in the second division of English football. In addition to the Second Division, the club competed in the FA Cup.

== Second Division ==
=== League table ===
Pos	Team	Pld	W	D	L	GF	GA	GAv	Pts	Qualification or relegation
1	Preston North End (C, P)	42	26	5	11	91	49	1.857	57	Promotion to the First Division
2	Manchester City (P)	42	19	14	9	89	61	1.459	52	Promotion to the First Division
3	Cardiff City	42	17	16	9	53	45	1.178	50	
4	Birmingham City	42	20	9	13	64	53	1.208	49	
5	Leeds United	42	20	8	14	63	55	1.145	48	

Rules for classification: 1) Points; 2) Goal average; 3) Goals scored
(C) Champions; (P) Promoted

=== Results summary ===
Overall								Home						Away					
Pld	W	D	L	GF	GA	GAv	Pts	W	D	L	GF	GA	Pts	W	D	L	GF	GA	Pts
42	19	14	9	89	61	1.459	52	12	6	3	53	25	30	7	8	6	36	36	22

=== Reports ===
Date	Opponents	H / A	Venue	Result F – A	Scorers	Attendance
19 August 1950	Preston North End	A	Deepdale	4 – 2	Smith (2), Westcott, Clarke	36,294
23 August 1950	Cardiff City	H	Maine Road	2 – 1	Westcott, Smith	14,858
26 August 1950	Bury	H	Maine Road	5 – 1	Westcott (3), Hart, Oakes	40,778
28 August 1950	Cardiff City	A	Ninian Park	1 – 1	Oakes	32,817
2 September 1950	Queens Park Rangers	A	Loftus Road	2 – 1	Smith, Clarke	21,593
6 September 1950	Grimsby Town	A	Blundell Park	4 - 4	Westcott (2), Spurdle, Clarke	18,529
9 September 1950	Chesterfield	H	Maine Road	5 – 1	Smith (2), Hart (2), Westcott	43,485
16 September 1950	Leicester City	A	Filbert Street	2 – 1	Turnbull, Smith	32,856
23 September 1950	Luton Town	H	Maine Road	1 – 1	Paul	42,333
30 September 1950	Coventry City	H	Maine Road	1 – 0	Spurdle	40,839
7 October 1950	Doncaster Rovers	A	Belle Vue	3 – 4	Smith (3)	32,837
14 October 1950	Brentford	H	Maine Road	4 - 0	Westcott (2), Hart, Clarke	39,497
21 October 1950	Swansea City	A	Vetch Field	3 – 2	Westwood, Westcott, Cunliffe	26,000
28 October 1950	Hull City	H	Maine Road	0 – 0		45,693
4 November 1950	Leeds United	A	Elland Road	1 – 1	Haddington	30,500
11 November 1950	West Ham United	H	Maine Road	2 – 0	Haddington, Westcott	35,000
18 November 1950	Blackburn Rovers	A	Ewood Park	1 – 4	Haddington	37,594
25 November 1950	Southampton	H	Maine Road	2 – 3	Haddington, Westcott	38,972
2 December 1950	Barnsley	A	Oakwell	1 – 1	Westcott	29,615
9 December 1950	Sheffield United	H	Maine Road	5 – 3	Smith (2), Westcott, Spurdle, Hart	33,172
16 December 1950	Preston North End	H	Maine Road	0 – 3		30,413
25 December 1950	Birmingham City	H	Maine Road	3 – 1	Paul (2), Westcott	40,064
26 December 1950	Birmingham City	A	St Andrews	0 – 1		32,000
13 January 1951	Chesterfield	A	Saltergate	2 – 1	Smith, Clarke	12,309
20 January 1951	Leicester City	H	Maine Road	1 – 1	Hart	30,198
27 January 1951	Bury	A	Gigg Lane	0 – 2		25,439
3 February 1951	Luton Town	A	Kenilworth Road	2 – 2	Smith (2)	12,087
17 February 1951	Coventry City	A	Highfield Road	2 – 0	Spurdle, Clarke	29,205
24 February 1951	Doncaster Rovers	H	Maine Road	3 – 3	Westcott (2), Oakes	38,572
3 March 1951	Brentford	A	Griffin Park	0 - 2		24,290
14 March 1951	Swansea City	H	Maine Road	1 – 2	Cunliffe	10,000
17 March 1951	Hull City	A	Boothferry Park	3 – 3	Westcott (2), Hart	25,000
24 March 1951	Leeds United	H	Maine Road	4 – 1	Westcott, Smith, Hart, Meadows	35,050
26 March 1951	Notts County	H	Maine Road	0 – 0		31,948
31 March 1951	West Ham United	A	Boleyn Ground	4 – 2	Smith (2), Westcott, Hart	22,000
4 April 1951	Queens Park Rangers	H	Maine Road	5 – 2	Hart (2), Westcott (2), Clarke	21,474
7 April 1951	Blackburn Rovers	H	Maine Road	1 – 0	Hart	37,754
14 April 1951	Southampton	A	The Dell	1 – 2	Hart	24,579
21 April 1951	Barnsley	H	Maine Road	6 – 0	Meadows (2), Hart (2), Smith, Clarke	36,439
28 April 1951	Sheffield United	A	Bramhall Lane	0 – 0		24,500
30 April 1951	Notts County	A	Meadow Lane	0 – 0		13,873
5 May 1951	Grimsby Town	H	Maine Road	2 – 2	Westcott, Smith	30,284

== FA Cup ==
=== Results ===
Date	Round	Opponents	H / A	Venue	Result F – A	Scorers	Attendance
6 January 1951	Third Round	Birmingham City	A	St Andrews	0 - 2		30,057
