= 1984–85 Manchester City F.C. season =

English football club season

Manchester City
1984–85 season
- Manager: Billy McNeill
- Stadium: Maine Road
- Second Division: 3rd (promoted)
- FA Cup: Third round
- Football League Cup: Round of 16
- Top goalscorer: League: Gordon Smith and David Phillips (12); All: Gordon Smith (14)
- Highest home attendance: 47,285 vs Charlton Athletic; 11 May 1985
- Lowest home attendance: 13,344 vs Blackpool; 25 September 1984
- Average home league attendance: 24,206 (highest in league, 7th highest in England)

The 1984–85 season was Manchester City's 83rd season of competitive football and 19th season in the second division of English football. In addition to the Second Division, the club competed in the FA Cup and Football League Cup. The club was promoted to the First Division at the end of the season.

== Second Division ==
=== League table ===
Pos	Team	Pld	W	D	L	GF	GA	GD	Pts	Relegation
1	Oxford United (C, P)	42	25	9	8	84	36	+48	84	Promotion to the First Division
2	Birmingham City (P)	42	25	7	10	59	33	+26	82	Promotion to the First Division
3	Manchester City (P)	42	21	11	10	66	40	+26	74	Promotion to the First Division
4	Portsmouth	42	20	14	8	69	50	+19	74	
5	Blackburn Rovers	42	21	10	11	66	41	+25	73	

Rules for classification: 1) Points; 2) Goal difference; 3) Goals scored
(C) Champions; (P) Promoted

=== Results summary ===
Overall								Home						Away					
Pld	W	D	L	GF	GA	GD	Pts	W	D	L	GF	GA	GD	W	D	L	GF	GA	GD
42	21	11	10	66	40	+26	74	14	4	3	42	16	+26	7	7	7	24	24	0

=== Results by matchday ===
Matchday	1	2	3	4	5	6	7	8	9	10	11	12	13	14	15	16	17	18	19	20	21	22	23	24	25	26	27	28	29	30	31	32	33	34	35	36	37	38	39	40	41	42
Ground	A	H	H	A	A	H	A	H	H	A	A	H	A	H	A	H	A	H	A	A	H	H	A	A	H	A	H	H	A	H	H	A	A	H	A	H	A	H	A	H	A	H
Result	D	W	L	L	D	W	W	W	W	L	L	W	D	W	D	D	W	W	W	L	D	W	D	W	W	W	L	W	W	W	W	D	L	D	D	L	L	W	W	D	L	W

A = Away; H = Home; W = Win; D = Draw; L = Loss

=== Matches ===
Date	Opponents	H / A	Venue	Result F–A	Scorers	Attendance
25 August 1984	Wimbledon	A	Plough Lane	2–2	Smith, Parlane	8,365
27 August 1984	Grimsby Town	H	Maine Road	3-0	Parlane, Smith, Bond	21,137
1 September 1984	Fulham	H	Maine Road	2-3	Parlane (2)	21,071
4 September 1984	Wolverhampton Wanderers	A	Molineux Stadium	0-2		13,255
8 September 1984	Carlisle United	A	Brunton Park	0-0		6,461
15 September 1984	Huddersfield Town	H	Maine Road	1-0	Baker	20,201
22 September 1984	Cardiff City	A	Ninian Park	3-0	Smith, Cunningham, Wilson	60,90
29 September 1984	Crystal Palace	H	Maine Road	2-1	Smith, Kinsey	20,252
6 October 1984	Oxford United	H	Maine Road	1-0	Kinsey	24,755
13 October 1984	Shrewsbury Town	A	Gay Meadow	0–1		8,563
20 October 1984	Middlesbrough	A	Ayresome Park	1-2	Kinsey	7,737
27 October 1984	Blackburn Rovers	H	Maine Road	2-1	Lowey (og), May	23,798
3 November 1984	Brighton & Hove Albion	A	Goldstone Ground	0-0		14,034
10 November 1984	Birmingham City	H	Maine Road	1-0	Philips	25,369
17 November 1984	Sheffield United	A	Bramhall Lane	0-0		16,605
24 November 1984	Portsmouth	H	Maine Road	2-2	Smith, Kinsey	23,700
1 December 1984	Oldham Athletic	A	Boundary Park	2-0	Melrose, Smith	14,129
8 December 1984	Notts County	H	Maine Road	2-0	Melrose, Philips	20,109
15 December 1984	Charlton Athletic	A	The Valley	3-1	Philips, Smith, Melrose	6,247
22 December 1984	Fulham	A	Craven Cottage	2–3	Baker, Melrose	6,874
26 December 1984	Barnsley	H	Maine Road	1-1	Melrose	27,131
29 December 1984	Wolverhampton Wanderers	H	Maine Road	4-0	Baker, Philips, Smith, Wilson	22,022
1 January 1985	Leeds United	A	Elland Road	1-1	Melrose	22,626
12 January 1985	Huddersfield Town	A	Leeds Road	2-0	Smith, Wilson	15,640
19 January 1985	Wimbledon	H	Maine Road	3-0	Smith, Philips, Baker	23,303
2 February 1985	Crystal Palace	A	Selhurst Park	2-1	Philips, Wilson	7,668
9 February 1985	Carlisle United	H	Maine Road	1-2	Philips	21,374
23 February 1985	Brighton & Hove Albion	H	Maine Road	2-0	Smith, Philips	20,227
2 March 1985	Blackburn Rovers	A	Ewood Park	1–0	Kinsey	22,099
9 March 1985	Middlesbrough	H	Maine Road	1-0	Philips	22,399
16 March 1985	Shrewsbury Town	H	Maine Road	4-0	Power, May, Kinsey	20,828
19 March 1985	Birmingham City	A	St Andrews	0-0		18,004
23 March 1985	Oxford United	A	Manor Ground	0-3		13,096
30 March 1985	Cardiff City	H	Maine Road	2-2	Simpson, Kinsey	20,047
6 April 1985	Barnsley	A	Oakwell	0-0		12,930
8 April 1985	Leeds United	H	Maine Road	1-2	Tolmie	33,553
13 April 1985	Grimsby Town	A	Blundell Park	1-4	McCarthy, Bond	8,362
20 April 1985	Sheffield United	H	Maine Road	2-0	Tolmie, Clements	21,132
27 April 1985	Portsmouth	A	Fratton Park	2-1	Philips, Simpson	22,232
4 May 1984	Oldham Athletic	H	Maine Road	0-0		28,933
6 May 1985	Notts County	A	Meadow Lane	2-3	Simpson (2)	17,812
11 May 1985	Charlton Athletic	H	Maine Road	5-1	Philips (2), May, Melrose, Simpson	47,285

== FA Cup ==
4 January 1985 Third round	Coventry City	2–1	Manchester City	Bordesley
				Stadium: St. Andrew's

== EFL Cup ==
24 September 1984 Second round	Manchester City	4–2	Blackpool	Manchester
				Stadium: Maine Road

9 October 1984 Second round	Blackpool	1–3	Manchester City	Blackpool
				Stadium: Bloomfield Road

30 October 1984 Third round	Manchester City	0–0	West Ham	Manchester
				Stadium: Maine Road

11 November 1984 Third round	West Ham	1–2	Manchester City	London
				Stadium: Boleyn Ground

20 November 1984 Round of 16	Chelsea	4–1	Manchester City	London
				Stadium: Stamford Bridge
