= 1983–84 Manchester City F.C. season =

English football club season

Manchester City
1983–84 season
- Manager: Billy McNeill
- Stadium: Maine Road
- Second Division: 4th
- FA Cup: Round 3
- Football League Cup: Round 3
- Top goalscorer: League: Derek Parlane (16); All: Derek Parlane (19)
- Highest home attendance: 41,862 vs Sheffield Wednesday; 10 December 1983
- Lowest home attendance: 14,021 vs Torquay United; 25 October 1983
- Average home league attendance: 25,604 (2nd highest in league, 6th highest in England)

The 1983–84 season was Manchester City's 82nd season of competitive football and 18th season in the second division of English football. In addition to the Second Division, the club competed in the FA Cup and Football League Cup.

== Second Division ==
=== League table ===
Pos	Team	Pld	W	D	L	GF	GA	GD	Pts	Relegation
2	Sheffield Wednesday (P)	42	26	10	6	72	34	+38	88	Promotion to the First Division
3	Newcastle United (P)	42	24	8	10	85	53	+32	80	Promotion to the First Division
4	Manchester City	42	20	10	12	66	48	+18	70	
5	Grimsby Town	42	19	13	10	60	47	+13	70	
6	Blackburn Rovers	42	17	16	9	57	46	+11	67	

Rules for classification: 1) Points; 2) Goal difference; 3) Goals scored
(P) Promoted

=== Results summary ===
Overall								Home						Away					
Pld	W	D	L	GF	GA	GD	Pts	W	D	L	GF	GA	GD	W	D	L	GF	GA	GD
42	20	10	12	66	48	+18	70	13	3	5	43	21	+22	7	7	7	23	27	−4

=== Results by matchday ===
Matchday	1	2	3	4	5	6	7	8	9	10	11	12	13	14	15	16	17	18	19	20	21	22	23	24	25	26	27	28	29	30	31	32	33	34	35	36	37	38	39	40	41	42
Ground	A	A	H	H	A	H	A	H	H	A	H	A	A	H	A	H	A	H	A	H	A	A	H	H	A	A	H	H	A	H	A	A	H	H	A	H	A	H	A	H	A	H
Result	W	L	W	D	W	W	W	W	W	L	W	L	W	W	L	D	W	L	D	W	W	D	D	W	L	D	W	L	D	W	D	L	W	L	W	W	D	L	L	L	D	W

A = Away; H = Home; W = Win; D = Draw; L = Loss

=== Matches ===
Date	Opponents	H / A	Venue	Result F–A	Scorers	Attendance
22 August 1983	Crystal Palace	A	Selhurst Park	2–0	May, Parlane	13,382
29 August 1983	Cardiff City	A	Ninian Park	1–2	Tolmie	8,899
3 September 1983	Barnsley	H	Maine Road	3–2	Tolmie (2), Parlane	25,105
7 September 1983	Fulham	H	Maine Road	0–0		23,356
10 September 1983	Portsmouth	A	Fratton Park	2–1	Tolmie, Parlane	18,852
17 September 1983	Blackburn Rovers	H	Maine Road	6–0	May, Parlane (3), Baker, Tolmie	25,433
24 September 1983	Leeds United	A	Elland Road	2–1	Baker, Parlane	21,918
1 October 1983	Grimsby Town	H	Maine Road	2–1	Caton, Tolmie	25,080
8 October 1983	Swansea City	H	Maine Road	2–1	Parlane, Davidson	23,571
15 October 1983	Charlton Athletic	A	The Valley	0–1		7,639
22 October 1983	Middlesbrough	H	Maine Road	2–1	Parlane, Tolmie	24,466
29 October 1983	Newcastle United	A	St James Park	0–5		33,588
5 November 1983	Shrewsbury Town	A	Gay Meadow	3–1	May, Caton, Kinsey	9,471
12 November 1983	Brighton & Hove Albion	H	Maine Road	4–0	Parlane, Baker (2), Tolmie	24,562
19 November 1983	Carlisle United	A	Brunton Park	0–2		8,745
26 November 1983	Derby County	H	Maine Road	1–1	Parlane	22,689
3 December 1983	Chelsea	A	Stamford Bridge	1–0	Tolmie	29,142
10 December 1983	Sheffield Wednesday	H	Maine Road	1–2	Bond	41,862
17 December 1983	Cambridge United	A	Abbey Stadium	0–0		5,204
26 December 1983	Oldham Athletic	H	Maine Road	2–0	Kinsey, Parlane	25,898
27 December 1983	Huddersfield Town	A	Leeds Road	3–1	Kinsey, Baker, Lomax	22,497
31 December 1983	Barnsley	A	Oakwell	1–1	Parlane	17,148
2 January 1984	Leeds United	H	Maine Road	1–1	Tolmie	34,441
14 January 1984	Crystal Palace	H	Maine Road	3–1	Power, Baker, Kinsey	20,144
21 January 1984	Blackburn Rovers	A	Ewood Park	1–2	Tolmie	18,199
4 February 1984	Grimsby Town	A	Blundell Park	1–1	Parlane	18,199
11 February 1984	Portsmouth	H	Maine Road	2–1	Tolmie, Reid	23,138
18 February 1984	Newcastle United	H	Maine Road	1–2	Kinsey	41,767
25 February 1984	Middlesbrough	A	Ayresome Park	0–0		9,343
3 March 1984	Shrewsbury	H	Maine Road	1–0	Reid	20,083
10 March 1984	Brighton & Hove Albion	A	Goldstone Ground	1–1	Hartford	14,132
17 March 1984	Fulham	A	Craven Cottage	1–5	McNab	9,684
24 March 1984	Cardiff City	H	Maine Road	2–1	Johnson, Baker	20,140
31 March 1984	Charlton Athletic	H	Maine Road	0–0		19,147
7 April 1984	Swansea City	A	Vetch Field	2–0	Parlane, Kinsey	9,459
14 April 1984	Carlisle United	H	Maine Road	3–1	May, Smith, Parlane	20,760
20 April 1984	Oldham Athletic	A	Boundary Park	2–2	McCarthy, Bond	19,952
23 April 1984	Huddersfield Town	H	Maine Road	2–3	Bond (2)	23,247
28 April 1984	Derby County	A	Baseball Ground	0–1		14,470
4 May 1984	Chelsea	H	Maine Road	0–2		21,713
7 May 1984	Sheffield Wednesday	A	Hillsborough	0–0		36,763
12 May 1984	Cambridge United	H	Maine Road	5–0	Tolmie, May, Baker, Kinsey, Power	20,787

== FA Cup ==
6 January 1984 Third round	Blackpool	2–1	Manchester City	Blackpool
				Stadium: Bloomfield Road

== EFL Cup ==
5 October 1983 Second round 1st leg	Torquay United	0–0	Manchester City	Torquay
				Stadium: Plainmoor

25 October 1983 Second round 2nd leg	Manchester City	6–0	Torquay United	Manchester
				Stadium: Maine Road

8 November 1983 Third round	Aston Villa	3–0	Manchester City	Aston
				Stadium: Villa Park
