= Billy Bremner =

Scottish footballer (1942–1997)

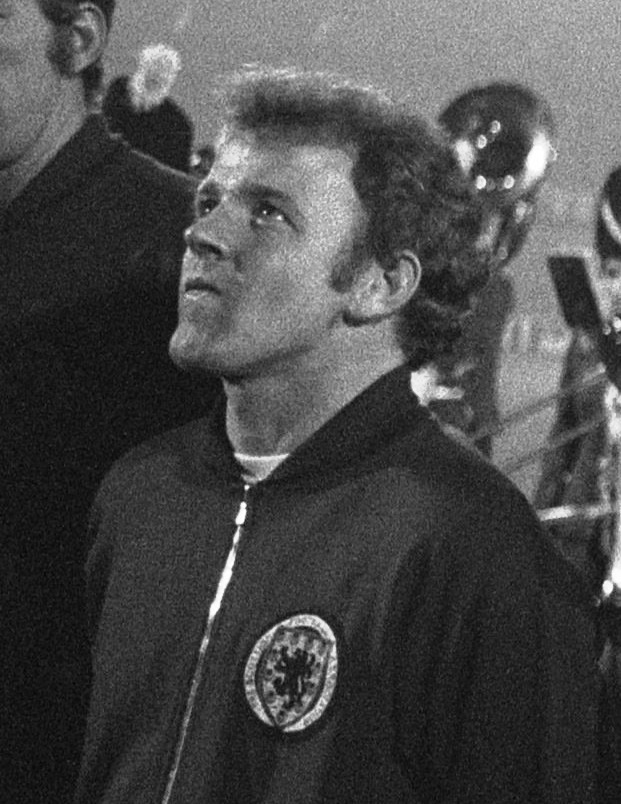
- Bremner lining up for Scotland in 1971

Personal information
- Full name: William John Bremner
- Date of birth: 9 December 1942
- Place of birth: Raploch, Stirling, Scotland
- Date of death: 7 December 1997 (aged 54)
- Place of death: Clifton, Doncaster, England
- Height: 5 ft 5 in (1.65 m)
- Position: Midfielder

Youth career
- 1959–1960: Leeds United

Senior career*
Years	Team	Apps	(Gls)
1960–1976	Leeds United	587	(91)
1976–1978	Hull City	61	(6)
1980–1982	Doncaster Rovers	5	(0)
Total		653	(97)

International career
	Scotland Schoolboys	4	(0)
1963	Scotland XI	1	(0)
1964–1965	Scotland U23	4	(1)
1965–1975	Scotland	54	(3)

Managerial career
- 1978–1985: Doncaster Rovers
- 1985–1988: Leeds United
- 1989–1991: Doncaster Rovers
- * Club domestic league appearances and goals

William John Bremner (9 December 1942 – 7 December 1997) was a Scottish professional footballer and manager. Regarded as one of the game's great midfielders, he combined precision passing skills with tenacious tackling and physical stamina. He played for Leeds United from 1959 to 1976, serving as captain from 1965, in the most successful period in the club's history.

At Leeds, Bremner won the First Division (1968–69 and 1973–74), Second Division (1963–64), Inter-Cities Fairs Cup (1968 and 1971), FA Cup (1972), League Cup (1968) and FA Charity Shield (1969). The club also finished second in numerous competitions, being runners-up five times in the English league and seven times in cup finals, including the 1975 European Cup. He was also named as the FWA Footballer of the Year in 1970 and was listed on the PFA Team of the Year in 1973–74. He has since been voted Leeds United's greatest player of all time and has a statue outside the south-east corner of their Elland Road stadium. He has also been included in the Football League 100 Legends and is a member of both the English Football Hall of Fame and Scottish Football Hall of Fame.

Bremner played for Hull City from 1976 to 1978, before being appointed player-manager at Doncaster Rovers in November 1978. He spent seven years as Doncaster manager, guiding the club to promotion out of the Fourth Division in 1980–81 and 1983–84, before he took on the manager's job at Leeds United in October 1985. He failed to gain promotion to the top flight and left the club in September 1988. He returned to Doncaster in July 1989, ending his second spell in charge in November 1991.

Bremner is on the Scotland national football team roll of honour for having won more than 50 caps for Scotland. He captained his country at the 1974 FIFA World Cup, where Scotland failed to advance from the group stage despite being unbeaten in the competition.

== Early life ==
=== Family and education ===
Billy Bremner was born in Stirling on 9 December 1942. His parents, John William ('Pop') and Bridget ('Bess'), lived in the Raploch district, reputedly a "tough area" in the shadow of Stirling Castle. His father was a storeman working for the Ministry of Defence at its 'Back-O-Hill' army barracks, located near Raploch.

Bremner, whose childhood nickname was 'Brock', attended St Mary's Primary School, which was "literally round the corner" from the family's home, till he was eleven. He played for the school's football team from the age of nine. In 1954, aged eleven, he left St Mary's and went to St Modan's High School, also near his home, and continued to develop as a footballer. Even as a boy, Bremner exhibited the sort of skill and determination that would become the hallmark of his professional career. He joined a local club called Gowanhill United when he was thirteen and soon earned a place in its under-21 team. Gowanhill's home ground was a piece of spare land called Shell Park which was between Raploch and the barracks.

=== Scotland Schoolboys ===
In November 1957, Bremner was one of two St Modan's boys given a trial for the Stirling Schoolboys County team. He was mentioned in a notice that appeared in the Edinburgh Evening News issue of 15 November 1957. He was selected to play for the county and his performances in those matches led to selection for Scotland Schoolboys. He made his international debut, aged fifteen, against Northern Ireland Schoolboys at Windsor Park on 28 March 1958. The match, played under floodlights, ended in a 2–2 draw.

Bremner played in three more matches for Scotland Schoolboys in the spring of 1958. His second appearance was against Wales Schoolboys at Somerton Park on 4 April, and this also ended 2–2. Next, on 26 April, Bremner made his first of many visits to Wembley Stadium, playing against England Schoolboys, whose team included Terry Venables, Phil Chisnall, and Ronnie Boyce. According to the Evening News, there was a crowd of over 90,000. England Schoolboys won 3–1 but Bremner, playing at inside left was praised for his quick through-ball passing and for his "remarkable stamina". He was interviewed by the News Chronicle after the match and surprised the reporter by saying that he wanted to join an English club, because "English football is faster". Bremner added that, if he didn't become a professional footballer, his choice of career would be glazier. Bremner's last match for Scotland Schoolboys was on 18 May, a return against England Schoolboys at Ibrox Stadium. It ended in a 2–2 draw and Bremner again received praise for his efforts. The News Chronicle said the midfield tussle between Venables and the "wee but tough Willie Bremner was one of the highlights".

=== Trial matches ===
After the schoolboy internationals, Bremner received invitations from Arsenal and Chelsea to play in trial matches. They both offered terms and Bremner went back to Scotland while he considered his options. He was then approached by both Celtic and Rangers. He favoured Celtic, whom he supported, but agreed to talk to Rangers first. After learning that Bremner was a Catholic, however, Rangers ended their interest. Bremner's father then stepped in and told him he should not join either of the two clubs because of their sectarian antipathy. Bremner said later that his father's final words on the matter were: "You're going to England, and that's that".

In early 1959, soon after his 16th birthday, Bremner was invited to join Leeds United by team manager Bill Lambton. Bremner accepted and joined the Leeds ground staff along with his friend Tommy Henderson, who had also played for Scotland Schoolboys. Lambton had recently signed Don Revie from Sunderland.

== Club career ==
=== Leeds United ===
Leeds had been promoted from the Second Division in 1955–56, the season in which Jack Charlton became a first team regular, but they had struggled since John Charles left in 1957, and were relegated after the 1959–60 season.

Jack Taylor replaced Bill Lambton as team manager on 1 May 1959. One of Taylor's first junior signings was fifteen-year-old Norman Hunter, who arrived at Elland Road in the summer and joined Bremner on the club's ground staff. Bremner signed a professional contract with Leeds on 12 December 1959, soon after his seventeenth birthday. Six weeks later, on 23 January 1960, Taylor gave Bremner his first team debut at outside-right in a 3–1 win against Chelsea at Stamford Bridge. Bremner played alongside Revie, who was the team's inside-right. Yorkshire Evening Post reporter Phil Brown noted that Bremner showed "enthusiasm, guts, intelligence, most accurate use of the ball and unselfishness" despite poor weather conditions. Regular outside-right Chris Crowe was sold to Blackburn Rovers in March 1960, allowing Bremner to take his place on a permanent basis.

Returning to the Second Division for the 1960–61 season, Leeds were beaten by future rivals Liverpool at Anfield in the opening match, after which Bremner was dropped from the team. He won his place back later in the season after meeting with Jack Taylor to explain his frustration at being left out. In March 1961, with the team in the lower half of the Second Division table, Taylor resigned and Revie took over as player-manager until March 1962 when he retired as a player and became the full-time manager. This was significant for young players like Hunter and Bremner because Revie initiated a youth development policy which was the basis of the club's future success. Among others who graduated were Paul Reaney, Peter Lorimer, Terry Cooper, Eddie Gray, and Paul Madeley. Revie rejected an offer of £25,000 from Hibernian for Bremner, despite the player wanting to return to Scotland to be with his fiancée.

Leeds struggled in the 1961–62 campaign, finishing just three points above the relegation zone, despite 12 goals in 45 appearances from Bremner, who finished as the club's joint top-scorer with centre-half Jack Charlton. In March 1962, Revie retired as a player and became the full-time manager. In the same month, Revie signed Bobby Collins from Everton; Collins helped to create the "win-at-all-costs" attitude that defined Leeds and Bremner throughout the rest of Revie's 13 years as manager.

Revie introduced some of the club's promising youngsters in the 1962–63 season; Hunter and Reaney made their debuts against Swansea Town at Vetch Field on 8 September 1962, Leeds winning 2–0. Revie's policy paid dividends as the team finished fifth, only four points behind promoted Chelsea. Bremner, however, was limited to 24 appearances. He was out of form and was dropped from the first team during the end of season run-in, which included a disproportionately high number of matches that had been postponed during the harsh winter conditions of early 1963.

Revie moved Bremner to central midfield. He bought Johnny Giles from Manchester United. The combination of Bremner and Giles became arguably the most effective midfield partnership of the next twelve years. With Bremner, Collins, and Giles in midfield, Leeds went on to win promotion as Second Division champions in the 1963–64 season. The club won no friends in doing so, however, and the following summer were labelled by the Football Association's own FA News as "the dirtiest [team] in the Football League. In November of the 1964–65 season Bremner featured heavily in a win at Everton that was marred by violent clashes on the pitch, the game was stopped for a short spell ten minutes before half-time as the referee felt that a spell of cooling down was needed to prevent further violence; despite the referee only giving 12 Leeds fouls to Everton's 19 the match helped to cement United's reputation as a dirty and overly physical team. A run of victories put the club top by the new year. However, they lost the title on goal average to Manchester United after drawing their last game of the season against already-relegated Birmingham City. Leeds faced Liverpool in the 1965 FA Cup Final at Wembley Stadium, and the game went to extra time after a 0–0 draw. Bremner scored a half-volley in the 100th minute to cancel out Roger Hunt's opener, but Ian St John won the game for Liverpool in the 113th minute.

In October 1965, Leeds skipper Collins was badly injured in an Inter-Cities Fairs Cup game against Torino. Revie gave the captaincy to Bremner for the remainder of the season after initially offering it to Charlton, who turned it down because he had a superstitious ritual of being last out of the tunnel on match days. Revie and Bremner had a strong bond of trust, and the manager had no doubts about Bremner's ability to lead the team. Leeds finished second in the 1965–66 league campaign, six points behind Liverpool. Leeds reached the 1967 Inter-Cities Fairs Cup Final against Dinamo Zagreb but lost 2–0 on aggregate; Zagreb won 2–0 at the Stadion Maksimir and held Leeds to a 0–0 draw at Elland Road. Leeds enjoyed a double success next season, however, winning both the 1968 Football League Cup Final, against Arsenal at Wembley; and the 1968 Inter-Cities Fairs Cup Final, in which they beat Ferencvárosi 1–0 at Elland Road and held them to a 0–0 draw at the Népstadion to win the club's first European trophy.

Revie targeted the title for the 1968–69 campaign and played Bremner in every league game as Leeds finished six points clear at the top to become champions of England for the first time. The title was secured with a 0–0 draw against Leeds' main rivals Liverpool, at Anfield on 28 April, after which Bremner led the players to applaud the Liverpool fans who responded by chanting "Champions, Champions, Champions". The 1969–70 season opened with victory in the 1969 FA Charity Shield, as Bremner captained Leeds to a 2–1 victory over Manchester City. With new arrival Allan Clarke played upfront alongside Mick Jones and Peter Lorimer Revie had to instruct Bremner and Giles to resist the temptation to get forward and attack. It took the team some time to gel, as only two wins came from the opening eight league games, and Leeds eventually finished a distant second to champions Everton. They chased Everton all season only to give up on the title after a home defeat by Southampton late in the campaign. In the European Cup Leeds recorded a club record 10–0 win over Norwegian side Lyn, with Bremner netting two of the goals. However they exited the competition at the semi-final stage after two defeats to Celtic; Bremner levelled the aggregate score by putting United 1–0 ahead in front of a competition record 136,505 spectators at Hampden Park, but Celtic came back to win the game and the tie with two second half goals. Further disappointment came in the 1970 FA Cup Final, where Leeds were beaten 2–1 by Chelsea in extra-time of the replay at Old Trafford. Bremner was named as FWA Footballer of the Year for the season.

"Leeds, like Sisyphus, have pushed three boulders almost to the top of three mountains and are now left to see them all back in the dark of the valley."

— The Times correspondent Geoffrey Green summarised the club's unsuccessful chase of the Treble in 1969–70.

The league title in the 1970–71 season was decided in mid-April in front of the Match of the Day cameras at Elland Road, when Leeds lost their lead at the top with defeat by West Bromwich Albion. The Leeds players blamed the referee for costing them the title as offside was not given for Colin Suggett for Jeff Astle's winner, and despite Bremner saying "But we fight on. Make no mistake about that, it is not over yet" Leeds could not overtake Arsenal, who went on to win the Double. Success instead came in the Inter-Cities Fairs Cup, as Leeds knocked out Sarpsborg (Norway), Dynamo Dresden (East Germany), Sparta Prague (Czechoslovakia), Vitória (Portugal) and Liverpool to reach the final with Juventus (Italy). Bremner recovered from an ankle injury just in time to face Liverpool in the semi-finals, and scored the only goal of the two-legged tie with a header at Anfield. Leeds won the final on the away goals rule after recording a 2–2 draw at the Stadio Olimpico di Torino and then a 1–1 draw at Elland Road.

Leeds finished second in the league for the third successive season in the 1971–72 campaign, despite playing some of the best football in the club's history. They knocked out Bristol Rovers, Liverpool, Cardiff City, Tottenham Hotspur and Birmingham City to reach the 1972 FA Cup Final with Arsenal; they then won the trophy for the first time in the club's history with Allan Clarke scoring the final's only goal. Two days after the final Leeds could have secured the Double by winning a point against Wolverhampton Wanderers at Molineux, but a 2–1 defeat handed the title to Derby County. On 3 February 1982, Bremner won £100,000 libel damages, along with legal costs, after he sued the Sunday People newspaper for publishing an article on 11 September 1977 that alleged he tried to fix football matches, including the May 1972 game at Wolves. Bremner donated the damages to a Leeds Hospice.

The title was nowhere near as close in the 1972–73 season, which saw Leeds finish third, seven points behind Liverpool. However more runners-up medals came from the FA Cup and the European Cup Winners' Cup. After Bremner scored the only goal of the semi-final clash with Wolves, Leeds went on to lose the FA Cup final 1–0 to Second Division Sunderland. They were then beaten 1–0 by Italian side A.C. Milan at the Kaftanzoglio Stadium in the European Cup Winners' Cup Final, though Bremner missed the final due to suspension. Revie instructed Bremner to be more attacking in the 1973–74 campaign, and the result was 11 goals in 52 appearances, his biggest goal tally in 12 years. The manager focused entirely on the league and told his team the aim was to go the season unbeaten, and although they lost three games they secured a second league title by a five-point margin on second-place Liverpool. Bremner was named on the PFA Team of the Year and finished second in the FWA Footballer of the Year voting to Ian Callaghan. At the end of the season he was given a testimonial match against Sunderland which raised him £32,500; he had chosen the opponents in an attempt to avenge defeat in the previous year's FA Cup final.

Manager Don Revie took the England management job in July 1974. Bremner applied for the vacant Leeds job after Johnny Giles had been named by Revie as his successor, but instead the board surprised everyone by appointing Brian Clough, who went on to a disastrous 44-day spell in charge of Leeds at the start of the 1974–75 season. Revie's departure was tough for Bremner, who had a strong bond with his manager. Leeds lost the 1974 FA Charity Shield in a penalty shoot-out to Liverpool, but more significantly Bremner and Kevin Keegan were sent off for fighting and received eleven game suspensions. By the time Bremner was allowed to play again Jimmy Armfield was the manager, though he refuted the accusation that he had attempted to undermine Clough as "ridiculous". Teammate Peter Lorimer insisted that the only criticism he had of Bremner was in applying for the management job against Giles, which had caused to board to look elsewhere for fear of dividing the dressing room by choosing between Bremner and Giles. Results improved with Bremner back in the side, and though they ended the season in ninth place, they were only eight points behind champions Derby. The club's biggest aim would be success in the European Cup, and they made it to the final after knocking out FC Zürich (Switzerland), Újpest FC (Hungary), Anderlecht (Belgium), and Barcelona (Spain). Their final opponents at Parc des Princes were defending champions Bayern Munich (Germany), who beat Leeds 2–0; United had a Lorimer goal controversially ruled out for an offside decision against Bremner and the tie ended in rioting by United fans.

With most of the Revie built team retiring or moving on to other clubs, Armfield had to rebuild the squad, though Bremner would still play 38 games in the 1975–76 campaign. However, he missed a lengthy spell in the new year due to injury and results dipped during this time and ultimately ended the club's title hopes; they went on to end the campaign in fifth spot.

=== Hull City ===
Bremner signed with Hull City for a £25,000 fee on 23 September 1976, manager John Kaye feeling that Bremner's experience would benefit his youthful Second Division side. His debut at Boothferry Park came against Brian Clough's Nottingham Forest, and Bremner was credited with scoring the winning goal of the game with a free-kick, though it seemed to have gone in with a significant deflection. Despite the good start results dipped midway through the 1976–77 season and the "Tigers" ended the season in 14th place. Despite suffering with a back injury Bremner was appointed as captain and played 32 games.

He missed the 1977–78 pre-season with a knee injury, but recovered well enough to make 36 appearances throughout the campaign. Kaye was sacked after a poor start to the season, and was replaced by Bremner's former Leeds teammate Bobby Collins, who had joined the club as assistant manager in the summer; as at Leeds, Bremner had applied for the vacant managerial role, but was rejected. After being turned down for the job he announced his intention to retire as a player at the end of his contract in June 1978. The season was a disaster, and though Collins was sacked and replaced by youth coach Ken Houghton in February, results did not improve and Hull were relegated in last place, ten points from safety.

== International career ==
Bremner was well established in the Scotland set-up, playing in a trial match against the Scottish Football League XI and winning four under-23 caps, before he made his senior debut for Scotland in May 1965, in a 0–0 draw with Spain at Hampden Park. He went on to feature in qualifying games for the 1966 FIFA World Cup, but defeats to Poland and Italy left Scotland second in their group, which was not enough to qualify. He also played in friendlies against Brazil and Portugal, and received a black eye from Pelé's elbow in a clash during a high ball; despite this being an accident it still demonstrated to Bremner how he had failed to intimidate Pelé as he had done to many other great players of the day.

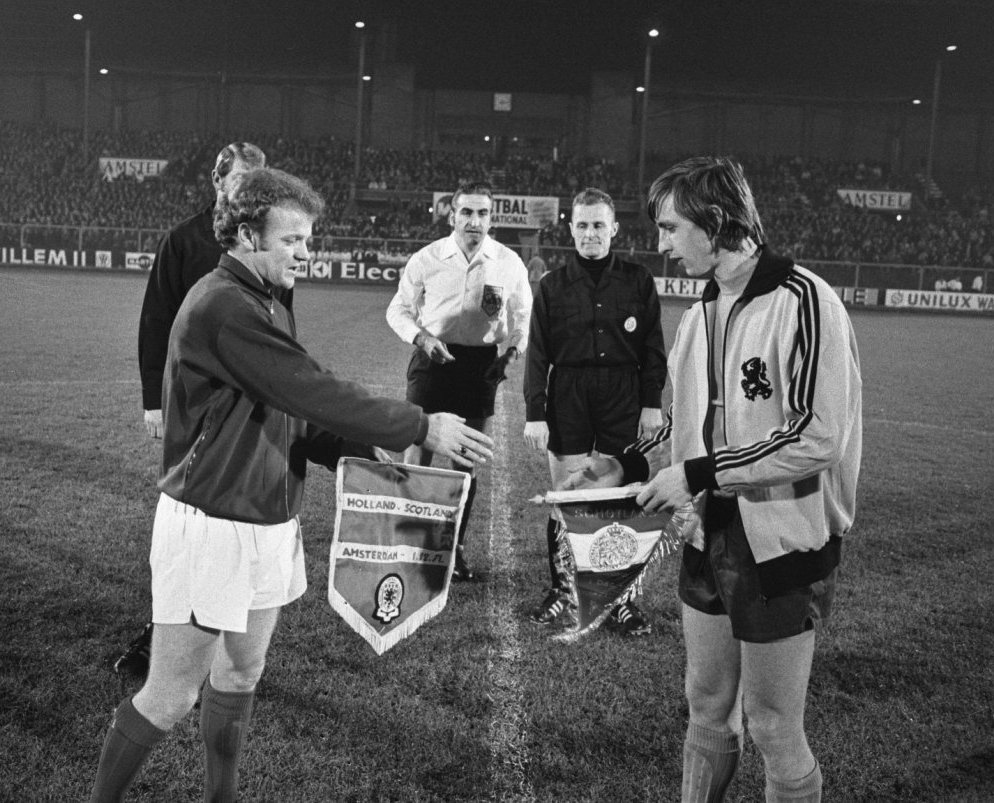
Bremner and Johan Cruyff in 1971

The England–Scotland football rivalry was intense throughout his playing career, and so great media attention came upon Bremner and the rest of the Scottish players after they beat world champions England 3–2 at Wembley to become the "unofficial world champions" on 15 April 1967. Many teammates said that Bremner held this match as one of the proudest moments of his career.

Placed in a tough group for qualification to the 1970 FIFA World Cup, Scotland failed to qualify after finishing in second place. Bremner captained his country throughout the process, having first taken up the armband in a friendly defeat by Denmark in Copenhagen. He scored his first international goal in a 2–1 qualifying victory over Austria at Hampden Park, his first game as captain. This game was followed by two victories over Cyprus and a 1–1 draw with West Germany, however a 3–2 defeat by West Germany in Hamburg ended their hopes of making it to the World Cup. Bremner's second international goal came in a 3–2 win over Wales in a British Home Championship game at the Racecourse Ground.

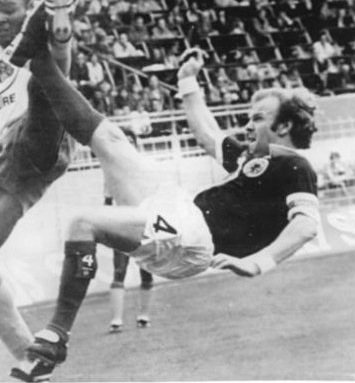
Bremner playing for Scotland at the 1974 World Cup

Scotland were the only home nation to qualify for the 1974 FIFA World Cup after finishing ahead of Czechoslovakia and Denmark in their group. However, Bremner was nearly not selected by manager Willie Ormond after Ormond found him drunk in a bar not long after Jimmy Johnstone had to be rescued by the coastguard having gotten stranded in a rowing boat during a night out following a home international match against Northern Ireland. Having been selected, Bremner captained Scotland to a 2–0 win over Zaire at the Westfalenstadion. He was later accused by Zairian player Ndaye Mulamba of racially abusing him during this match, as well as spitting at Mulamba and Mana Mamuwene. A highly creditable 0–0 draw against world champions Brazil left Scotland with high hopes of qualifying to the second round. Yet a 1–1 draw with Yugoslavia sent Scotland out of the competition unbeaten due to Brazil and Yugoslavia finishing level on points but with superior goal difference.

Bremner's last cap came against Denmark on 3 September 1975. An incident in Copenhagen after the game where several players were ejected from a nightclub for an alleged fight led to a lifetime ban from international football by the Scottish Football Association; four other players, Willie Young, Joe Harper, Pat McCluskey and Arthur Graham also were banned for life (Graham and Harper later had their bans overturned). Bremner maintained his innocence, stating that the incident had been blown out of proportion by the SFA.

== Playing style and personality ==
Bremner began his Leeds career as a right winger but came into his own after Revie shifted him to a central midfield role. In that position, Bremner became a "fiery midfield dynamo" whose "tireless energy" made him a natural leader on the field, always spurring his team on to greater efforts. In its Hall of Fame dedication to him, the National Football Museum said: "His priceless precision passing, stamina and skill led him to become a Leeds United legend and one of the game's greatest midfielders".

In 2007, a Sunday Times article described Bremner as "10st of barbed wire" due to his tenacity and tough tackling.

== Management career ==
=== Doncaster Rovers (1978–1985) ===
Bremner was appointed manager of struggling Fourth Division side Doncaster Rovers in November 1978. He oversaw a 1–0 win over Rochdale at Belle Vue in his first match in charge. Results fluctuated during the 1978–79 season, demonstrated by a 7–1 defeat by struggling AFC Bournemouth punctuating a run of five wins in six games. Rovers ended the season in 22nd place, though 11 points ahead of Halifax Town and Crewe Alexandra, and successfully applied to the Football League for re-election.

He introduced massages and changed the canteen and team kit for the 1979–80 campaign. With no money available for transfers he was forced to turn to the youth team for new players, though he could afford to take on Ian Nimmo, Hugh Dowd, John Dowie and Billy Russell on free transfers. He appointed former Leeds coach Les Cocker as his assistant. The season started poorly, but the squad bonded following Cocker's death on 4 October and went on a run of six straight wins, for which Bremner was credited with the Fourth Division Manager of the Month award. However a run of just one win in 15 games followed, for which Bremner blamed his small squad and lack of training facilities. A mounting injury crisis caused him to make a return to playing on 29 March for the visit of Bournemouth, a game in which 16-year-old Ian Snodin was named on the bench. Rovers ended the season in 12th place.

A disappointing opening sequence of the 1980–81 season was followed by six wins in six games in September, and Bremner won his second Manager of the Month award. The good results continued for the rest of the campaign, and Rovers were promoted in third place. He signed Celtic's Colin Douglas for the challenge of Third Division football, but otherwise remained loyal to his promotion squad for the approaching 1981–82 season. Another strong September, six wins seeing the club rise to second in the table, won Bremner the Third Division Manager of the Month award. However a lean spell would follow, and from November to February Doncaster failed to win in the league. Results again picked up with only two defeats in the last 14 games, and they ended the campaign in 19th spot, three points above the relegation zone.

Strong competition promoted from the Fourth Division – Wigan Athletic, Sheffield United and Bradford City – made the 1982–83 campaign a tough prospect. A weak defence saw an unusual sequence of high-scoring matches early in the season: 6–1 win over Exeter City, 7–5 win over Reading, 6–3 defeat by Wigan, and a 4–4 draw with Brentford. Only seven wins from the last 36 games of the season left Doncaster relegated in 23rd place, 16 points behind 20th-place Orient.

To try and win immediate promotion during the 1983–84 season Bremner signed veteran forward Ernie Moss (who had won three promotions out of the division), Andy Kowalski, left-back John Breckin, experienced defender Bill Green, and young midfielder Mark Miller. Investment by new director Peter Wetzel allowed Bremner to spend £120,000 on three players in March: £60,000 on Stirling Albion defender John Philliben, £25,000 on young Celtic midfielder Jim Dobbin, and £35,000 on Shrewsbury Town defender Alan Brown. Promotion was secured in comfortable fashion, as they finished as runners-up to runaway champions York City, ten points above fifth-place Aldershot.

Building for the 1984–85 campaign, Bremner signed former Leeds striker Aiden Butterworth and winger John Buckley (£25,000 from Partick Thistle). Doncaster won five of their opening seven games, and though they were unable to sustain a promotion push they showed their ability with a 1–0 win over eventual champions Bradford at Valley Parade on Boxing Day and a 1–0 FA Cup win over First Division side Queens Park Rangers on 5 January. Rovers finished the season in 14th place, some distance from the promotion and the relegation places.

To pay for stadium upgrades necessitated by the aftermath of the Bradford City stadium fire Doncaster were forced to sell Ian and Glynn Snodin, who went to Leeds and Sheffield Wednesday and respectively for a total of £315,000. To replace them he bought Dave Rushbury from Gillingham for £10,000 and spent £60,000 on Millwall defender Dave Cusack.

=== Leeds United (1985–1988) ===
Bremner was appointed as Leeds United manager in October 1985, having impressed the boardroom with his work at Doncaster, particularly his negotiation skills during the sale of Ian Snodin; Leeds paid Doncaster £45,000 in compensation. The club had declined during his absence; Leeds had dropped down into the Second Division, sold Elland Road to the council to raise money, and club supporters picked up a reputation for violence after regular hooligan riots in the stands. He quickly reinstated Don Revie's philosophy and his little traditions, for example he reinstated the sessions of carpet bowls on Friday evenings. Despite this he appointed Ian Snodin as club captain, and dropped former captain and teammate Peter Lorimer from the starting line eleven. He also moved on the young players signed by former manager and teammate Eddie Gray, choosing to sign experienced players in their place. Five key young players to leave the club were Scott Sellars (£20,000 to Blackburn Rovers), Terry Phelan (free transfer to Swansea City), Denis Irwin, Tommy Wright and Andy Linighan (all to Oldham Athletic for £60,000, £55,000 and £80,000 respectively). The money raised allowed him to buy central defender Brendan Ormsby (£65,000 from Aston Villa), and also sign David Rennie, Brian Caswell and Ronnie Robinson. Leeds struggled in the 1985–86 season, but managed to steer away from the relegation zone to finish in 14th place.

During the 1986 close season, Bremner spent £125,000 on 29-year-old Sheffield United striker Keith Edwards, and a further £80,000 to bring in 31-year-old Carlisle United defender Jack Ashurst and Newcastle United defender Peter Haddock. Other new arrivals were winger Russell Doig (£15,000 from East Stirlingshire), goalkeeper Ronnie Sinclair (free transfer from Nottingham Forest) and midfielder John Buckley (£35,000 from Doncaster Rovers, having also signed him whilst at Doncaster). Aiming for a promotion push in the 1986–87 campaign, Leeds were stuck in mid-table by February after selling Snodin to Everton for £840,000. This sale though allowed Bremner money for further signings and he took left-back Bobby McDonald from Oxford United, full-back Micky Adams from Coventry City for £110,000, and striker John Pearson and defender Mark Aizlewood from Charlton Athletic for £72,000 and £200,000 respectively. A 2–1 FA Cup Fifth Round victory over First Division side Queens Park Rangers then raised belief in the players, and they qualified for the play-offs by the end of the campaign. The FA Cup run continued into the semi-finals, where they were knocked out 3–2 by Coventry City at Hillsborough in a close-run game that ran into extra-time. After overcoming Oldham in the play-off semi-final their opponents in the play-off final were Charlton Athletic, and after 1–0 home wins in both legs the tie went to a replay at St Andrew's. John Sheridan put Leeds ahead in extra-time of the replay, but two late goals from Peter Shirtliff changed the game and denied Leeds promotion.

Bremner signed a new three-year contract in the 1987 close season. New arrivals at the club were Glynn Snodin (£150,000 from Sheffield Wednesday), winger Gary Williams (£230,000 from Aston Villa) and Bobby Davison (£350,000 from Derby County), as well as Jim Melrose and Ken DeMange. A more significant new face was David Batty, a key player of the future who was given his debut from the youth team. United started the season inconsistently, but five straight wins in December won Bremner the Second Division Manager of the Month award. The inconsistent results returned however, and Leeds finished the 1987–88 season in seventh place, eight points outside the play-offs. Bremner did not enjoy a good relationship with the club's board, who felt him to be uncommunicative with them, and after a poor start to the 1988–89 season he was sacked in September 1988. His successor, Howard Wilkinson, was given money to spend by the board and Leeds went on to win promotion in 1990.

=== Doncaster Rovers (1989–1991) ===
In July 1989 Bremner went back as manager to Doncaster, who had fallen back into the Fourth Division during his absence. He signed Lincoln City winger John McGinley and Leeds midfielder John Stiles, and led the club to a 20th-place finish in 1989–90, which represented a small improvement on the previous season. Greater success came in the Football League Trophy, Rovers reaching the area finals, where they were beaten by Third Division leaders Tranmere Rovers.

New additions for the 1990–91 campaign were Peterborough United goalkeeper Paul Crichton, Stoke City defender Andy Holmes and Tottenham Hotspur midfielder Eddie Gormley, as well as his former Leeds captain Brendan Ormsby. Rovers were top of the table at the turn of the year, but injuries and lack of form caused results to fall away, as did hopes of promotion, and Doncaster finished the campaign in 11th place. Rovers started the 1991–92 season badly and Bremner tendered his resignation on 2 November, with the club sitting bottom of the Football League.

== Personal life and later years ==
=== Family and post-football activity ===
Bremner married Veronica Dick on 14 November 1962. He had a ghost-written column in Shoot magazine throughout the 1970s. After retiring from football in November 1991 he took up work as an after dinner speaker.

=== Illness and death ===
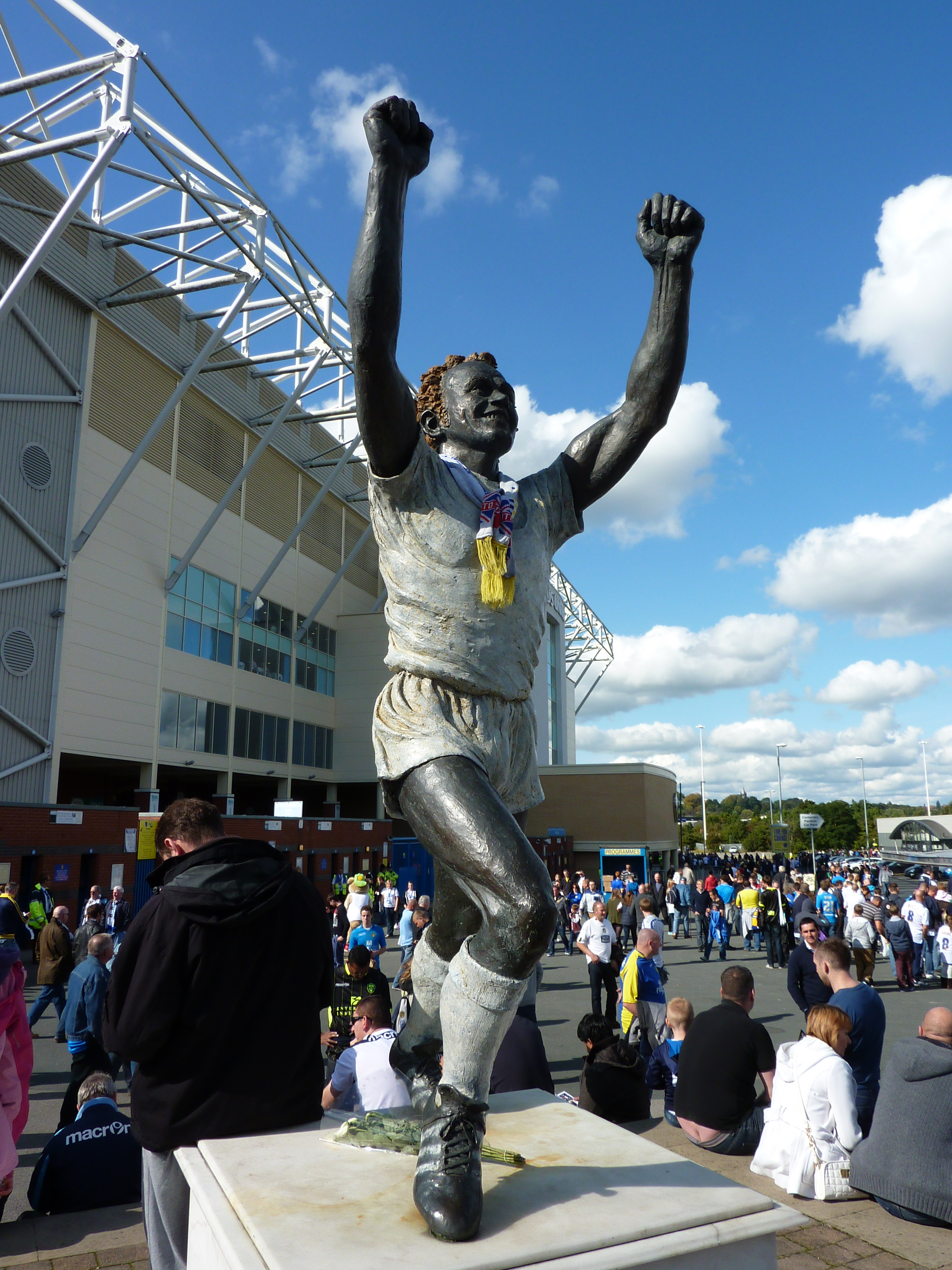
Billy Bremner statue in celebratory stance outside Leeds United's ground Elland Road

On 5 December 1997, Bremner was rushed to Doncaster Royal Infirmary suffering from pneumonia and subsequently died from a heart attack on 7 December, two days before his 55th birthday.

His funeral, attended by many of Bremner's former team-mates and other football players and coaches, was held four days later in the Yorkshire village of New Edlington. A statue by sculptor Frances Segelman of Bremner in celebratory pose was erected outside Elland Road in tribute in 1999.

=== Awards ===
In 1988, the Football League, as part of its centenary season celebrations, included Bremner on its list of 100 League Legends. He was inducted into both the English Football Hall of Fame and the Scottish Football Hall of Fame. He was inducted into the National Football Museum Hall of Fame in 2004, with the acknowledgement that: "his priceless precision passing, stamina and skill led him to become a Leeds United legend and one of the game's greatest midfielders" and that he "was not simply tough but a skilful player with an ability to score in crucial games". In 2006, he was voted Leeds United's greatest player of all time. In September 2013 he was voted as the greatest captain in the Football League's history.

Billy Bremner was one of Britain's most fiery, skilful and industrious footballers of the post-war years. An essential cog in the pragmatic, often over-robust yet frequently wonderfully entertaining Leeds United team of the Sixties and Seventies, he was also the red-haired dynamo in Scotland's international side, winning 54 caps.

— Opening paragraph of Bremner's obituary in The Independent

=== The Damned United ===
Bremner was portrayed by Stephen Graham in the 2009 biographical drama film The Damned United, directed by Tom Hooper and starring Michael Sheen as Brian Clough.

== Career statistics ==
=== Club ===
Appearances and goals by club, season and competition
Club	Season	League			FA Cup		League Cup		Europe (Note: Appearances in Inter-Cities Fairs Cup, European Cup, European Cup Winners' Cup, and UEFA Cup)		Total (Note: Two FA Charity Shield appearances (1969–70 and 1974–75))	
Club	Season	Division	Apps	Goals	Apps	Goals	Apps	Goals	Apps	Goals	Apps	Goals
Leeds United	1959–60	First Division	11	2	1	0	2	1	0	0	14	3
Leeds United	1960–61	Second Division	31	9	1	0	2	1	0	0	34	10
Leeds United	1961–62	Second Division	39	11	2	0	4	1	0	0	45	12
Leeds United	1962–63	Second Division	24	10	0	0	0	0	0	0	24	10
Leeds United	1963–64	Second Division	39	3	3	1	1	0	0	0	43	4
Leeds United	1964–65	First Division	40	6	8	1	1	0	0	0	49	7
Leeds United	1965–66	First Division	41	8	2	0	0	0	11	2	54	10
Leeds United	1966–67	First Division	37	2	6	0	4	0	10	1	57	3
Leeds United	1967–68	First Division	36	2	5	0	6	1	10	0	57	3
Leeds United	1968–69	First Division	42	6	2	0	2	1	8	1	54	8
Leeds United	1969–70	First Division	35	4	9	1	2	0	8	3	54	8
Leeds United	1970–71	First Division	26	3	2	0	1	0	10	3	39	6
Leeds United	1971–72	First Division	41	5	7	0	4	0	1	0	53	5
Leeds United	1972–73	First Division	38	4	7	1	5	0	7	0	57	5
Leeds United	1973–74	First Division	42	10	5	1	1	0	4	0	52	11
Leeds United	1974–75	First Division	27	1	8	0	2	0	6	3	43	4
Leeds United	1975–76	First Division	34	5	2	0	2	0	0	0	38	5
Leeds United	1976–77	First Division	4	0	2	0	0	0	0	0	6	0
Leeds United	Total		587	91	72	5	39	5	75	13	773	114
Hull City	1976–77	Second Division	30	2	2	0	0	0	0	0	32	2
Hull City	1977–78	Second Division	31	4	1	0	4	1	0	0	36	5
Hull City	Total		61	6	3	0	4	1	0	0	68	7
Doncaster Rovers	1978–79	Fourth Division	0	0	0	0	0	0	0	0	0	0
Doncaster Rovers	1979–80	Fourth Division	1	0	0	0	0	0	0	0	1	0
Doncaster Rovers	1980–81	Fourth Division	3	0	0	0	0	0	0	0	3	0
Doncaster Rovers	1981–82	Third Division	1	0	0	0	0	0	0	0	1	0
Doncaster Rovers	Total		5	0	0	0	0	0	0	0	5	0
Career total			653	97	75	5	44	6	75	13	814	121

=== International ===
Appearances and goals by national team and year
National team	Year	Apps	Goals
Scotland	1965	4	0
Scotland	1966	5	0
Scotland	1967	2	0
Scotland	1968	4	1
Scotland	1969	8	1
Scotland	1971	5	0
Scotland	1972	8	0
Scotland	1973	7	0
Scotland	1974	9	1
Scotland	1975	2	0
Total		54	3

Scores and results list Scotland's goal tally first, score column indicates score after each Bremner goal.

List of international goals scored by Billy Bremner
No.	Date	Venue	Opponent	Score	Result	Competition
1	6 November 1968	Hampden Park, Glasgow, Scotland	Austria	2–1	2–1	1970 FIFA World Cup qualification
2	3 May 1969	Racecourse Ground, Wrexham, Wales	Wales	4–3	5–3	1968–69 British Home Championship
3	20 November 1974	Hampden Park, Glasgow, Scotland	Spain	1–0	1–2	UEFA Euro 1976 qualifying

=== Managerial statistics ===
Managerial record by team and tenure
Team	From	To	Record				
Team	From	To	P	W	D	L	Win %
Doncaster Rovers	25 November 1978	1 October 1985	352	128	89	135	36.4
Leeds United	11 October 1985	28 September 1988	143	59	32	52	41.3
Doncaster Rovers	3 July 1989	2 November 1991	118	33	29	56	28.0
Total			613	220	150	243	35.9

== Honours ==
=== Player ===
Leeds United

- Football League First Division: 1968–69, 1973–74
- Football League Second Division: 1963–64
- FA Cup: 1971–72; runner-up: 1964–65, 1969–70, 1972–73
- Football League Cup: 1967–68
- FA Charity Shield: 1969
- Inter-Cities Fairs Cup: 1967–68, 1970–71
- European Cup runner-up: 1974–75

Individual

- Rothmans Golden Boots Awards: 1970, 1971, 1972, 1973, 1974
- FWA Footballer of the Year: 1970
- Sport Ideal European XI: 1973, 1974
- PFA Team of the Year: 1973–74 First Division
- Scotland national football team roll of honour: 1974

=== Manager ===
Doncaster Rovers

- Football League Fourth Division third-place promotion: 1980–81
- Football League Fourth Division second-place promotion: 1983–84

Individual

- Football League Fourth Division Manager of the Month: October 1979, September 1980
- Football League Third Division Manager of the Month: September 1981
- Football League Second Division Manager of the Month: December 1987

== See also ==
- List of footballers in England by number of league appearances (500+)
- List of Scotland national football team captains

== Bibliography ==
- Bale, Bernard (1998). Bremner! The Legend of Billy Bremner. London: André Deutsch Ltd. ISBN 978-0-2339-9477-2.
- Harrison, Paul (2010). Keep Fighting. The Billy Bremner Story. Edinburgh: Black & White Publishing. ISBN 978-1-8450-2324-9.
- Hunter, Norman; Waters, Don (2004). Biting Talk. Hodder & Stoughton. ISBN 978-0-3408-3082-6.
- Sutcliffe, Richard (2011). Bremner. Great Northern. ISBN 978-1-9050-8091-5.
