= Don Revie =

English footballer and manager (1927–1989)

Don Revie OBE
- Revie (left) with Billy Bremner after winning the 1972 FA Cup final

Personal information
- Full name: Donald George Revie
- Date of birth: 10 July 1927
- Place of birth: Middlesbrough, Yorkshire, England
- Date of death: 26 May 1989 (aged 61)
- Place of death: Edinburgh, Scotland
- Height: 5 ft 11 in (1.80 m)
- Position: Second striker

Youth career
- Newport Boys' Club
- Middlesbrough Swifts

Senior career*
Years	Team	Apps	(Gls)
1944–1949	Leicester City	96	(25)
1949–1951	Hull City	76	(12)
1951–1956	Manchester City	162	(37)
1956–1958	Sunderland	64	(15)
1958–1962	Leeds United	76	(11)
Total		474	(100)

International career
1953	The Football League XI	1	(3)
1954	England B	1	(0)
1954–1955	England	6	(4)

Managerial career
- 1961–1974: Leeds United
- 1974–1977: England
- 1977–1980: United Arab Emirates
- 1980–1984: Al-Nasr
- 1984: Al-Ahly
- * Club domestic league appearances and goals

Donald George Revie (10 July 1927 – 26 May 1989) was an English football player and manager. He is best known for managing Leeds United from 1961 until 1974, winning the Football League First Division twice and the FA Cup once, before being the England national football team manager for three years.

A forward, he began his career with Leicester City in August 1944, before a £19,000 move to Hull City in November 1949. He was sold on to Manchester City in October 1951 for a fee of £25,000, where he became the main focus of the "Revie Plan" which saw him named as FWA Footballer of the Year in the 1954–55 season, after innovating the role of the first deep-lying centre forward in England. He won the FA Cup in 1956, having finished on the losing side in the 1955 final. He was bought by Sunderland for £22,000 in October 1956 before moving on to Leeds United in November 1958 for a £14,000 fee. In total, he scored 108 goals in 501 league and cup appearances in an 18-year professional career, also scoring four goals in six England appearances, as well as winning representative honours for the Football League XI and the England B team.

In March 1961, Revie was appointed player-manager of Leeds United, then a Second Division club that had never won a major trophy. Under Revie's management, Leeds became a major force in English football, winning the Second Division in the 1963–64 season, the First Division in the 1968–69 and 1973–74 seasons, the FA Cup in 1972, the League Cup in 1968, the FA Charity Shield in 1969, and the Inter-Cities Fairs Cup in 1968 and 1971. Additionally, Leeds were First Division runners-up five times, three times FA Cup runners-up and runners-up in the Inter-Cities Fairs Cup and the European Cup Winners' Cup. In July 1974, he accepted the job as the England manager. He had an unsuccessful three years in the role before quitting in highly controversial circumstances to take the management role with the United Arab Emirates. He later had spells in Middle Eastern club football with Al-Nasr and Al-Ahly.

As Leeds manager, he was criticised for his teams' physical and often negative approach, though the period was noted for its highly physical football across the country. His resignation as England manager fuelled criticism of him as money-obsessed, and unproved allegations of bribery and financial misconduct tarnished his reputation. He retired in 1984 but was diagnosed with motor neurone disease in May 1987, which led to his death two years later. He remains a highly popular figure in Leeds and has a stand named after him at Elland Road and a statue outside the ground.

== Early life ==
Revie was born in Middlesbrough, North Riding of Yorkshire, on Sunday, 10 July 1927. His father, also named Donald, was a joiner who found himself frequently out of work during the Great Depression. His mother, a washerwoman, died of cancer on 27 November 1939, aged 50. He played youth football for Newport Boys' Club and then Middlesbrough Swifts, who were coached by influential manager Bill Sanderson. He learnt the rudiments of the game using a small bundle of rags in the tiny yard behind his home. This influenced his thinking in later life, and he argued that young players should learn using smaller footballs on smaller pitches so they would be more adept in control when progressing to a bigger football.

== Club career ==
=== Leicester City ===
He signed as a professional footballer for Leicester City in August 1944, choosing them ahead of local club Middlesbrough primarily due to the close links between Middlesbrough Swifts and Leicester City; he also worked as an apprentice bricklayer. Leicester originally thought he was not good enough to turn professional, but he was taken under the wing of Leicester player Sep Smith, who mentored Revie on many of his ideas about the game. Smith instructed Revie that "When not in position, get into position; never beat a man by dribbling if you can beat him more easily with a pass; it is not the man on the ball but the one running into position to take the pass who constitutes the danger; and the aim is to have a man spare in a passing move. Soccer would then become easy." He played in the wartime league before making his debut in the Football League on the opening day of the 1946–47 season, a 3–0 defeat to Manchester City, who would go on to win the Second Division that season. He showed good form at Filbert Street before breaking his right ankle in three places after a tackle from Tottenham Hotspur's Ron Burgess; the injury could have ended his career, but he recovered to full fitness within 19 weeks.

Manager Johnny Duncan identified Revie as the player to build his team around for the 1947–48 and 1948–49 seasons, and though the Foxes fared poorly in the league they managed to reach the 1949 FA Cup final. Revie scored the opening goal of the semi-final victory over First Division champions Portsmouth, having been told pre-match that opposition goalkeeper Ernest Butler tended to palm the ball over the attacker's head before reclaiming possession Revie positioned himself to take advantage of the situation when teammate Jack Lee challenged Butler for the ball, leaving Revie with a simple conversion. However Revie suffered a nasal haemorrhage caused by a burst vein one week before the final, and the condition became so severe it would threaten his life and see him miss his first chance to play at Wembley. He could only listen on the radio as Leicester lost 3–1 to Wolverhampton Wanderers in the final. Revie left Leicester after Duncan left the club, having already been dissatisfied with the club's lack of progress in the league.

=== Hull City ===
In November 1949, he joined Second Division club Hull City for a transfer fee of £19,000. He chose to join the Tigers ahead of bigger clubs like Arsenal and Manchester City, who had shown interest in signing him since Hull were managed by Raich Carter, who had been a great player before and after World War II. Carter did improve Revie's game but was not a success as Hull manager, as City finished mid-table in the 1949–50 and 1950–51 seasons, before becoming involved in a relegation battle in the 1951–52 season. Teammate Andy Davidson later said Revie failed to fulfil his potential at Boothferry Park as he was not a tough player. The rest of the Hull team were not physically dominant enough to protect him and allow him to dictate play with his accurate passing. As at Leicester, Revie felt the time had come for him to move on and handed in a transfer request once Carter departed.

=== Manchester City ===
Revie was sold to First Division side Manchester City for £25,000 (including a part-exchange for Ernie Phillips, valued at £12,000) in October 1951. The Citizens struggled in the 1951–52 season and then went on to finish just one place above the relegation zone in the 1952–53 campaign. Revie was often isolated from the rest of the team due to his lack of pace. The sale of Ivor Broadis then allowed Revie to drop deeper down the field and allowed manager Les McDowall to put Revie in what eventually proved to be a pivotal role, introducing to English football the position of deep-lying centre forward. This evolved into the so-called "Revie Plan", with Revie as the central figure. His role derived from the more traditional inside right position and was based on the style of the successful Hungary national team, and in particular Nándor Hidegkuti, who invented the role. Revie devoted 20 pages to analysing and explaining the plan in his autobiography Soccer's Happy Wanderer written in 1955.

Revie had improved his goal tally to 13 in the 1953–54 season, but only once the Revie Plan was implemented in the 1954–55 campaign were Manchester City able to fully make use of his abilities. The new tactic opened with a 5–0 defeat to Preston North End, but then Ken Barnes replaced John McTavish at inside-forward and the team clicked. Though the tactic was named after Revie, it had initially been introduced at the reserve team level by Johnny Williamson. However, Revie's superior passing talents meant Williamson was overlooked for the position at first team level. City's league title campaign fell away, but they went on to reach the 1955 FA Cup final at Wembley, where they were beaten 3–1 by Newcastle United; a first-half injury to Jimmy Meadows left City down to ten men and unable to compete effectively. At the end of the season, Revie was named as FWA Footballer of the Year.

McDowall fined Revie £27 for missing two weeks of training for a family holiday in Blackpool, which infuriated him as he had received permission from trainer Laurie Barnett and had promised to train whilst on holiday. McDowall dropped Revie for much of the 1955–56 season, preferring instead to play Bobby Johnstone. Revie played only one FA Cup match that season before being named in the team for the 1956 FA Cup final against Birmingham City, with Johnstone being moved to the wings. He provided the assist for Joe Hayes's opening goal and instructed Ken Barnes to deviate from the manager's instructions at half-time, with the result being a more dominant second half display and a 3–1 victory; Revie was named as Man of the Match. However the rift with his manager was not forgotten, and he was moved to right-half in the 1956–57 campaign, leaving him to seek a move away from Maine Road.

=== Sunderland ===
In October 1956, Sunderland manager Bill Murray bought Revie for a £22,000 fee. Poor results left the Rokerites facing relegation towards the end of the 1956–57 campaign, but a late seven-game unbeaten run lifted them to safety, just one place above relegated Cardiff City. A financial scandal over illegal payments to players resulted in harsh sanctions at Roker Park from The Football Association and forced Murray's resignation. His replacement, Alan Brown, preferred a more physical style of play that did not suit Revie. Sunderland suffered relegation from the First Division for the first time in the club's history in the 1957–58 season, and Revie was dropped for the 1958–59 Second Division campaign in favour of a youth policy. In September 1958, he rejected the opportunity to sign for hometown club Middlesbrough – had he joined the club then he would have played alongside captain Brian Clough and goalkeeper Peter Taylor.

=== Leeds United ===
Revie returned to the First Division when he joined Leeds United in November 1958 for a £14,000 fee, seven years after their first attempt to sign him from Hull for £25,000 had been rejected. Manager Bill Lambton had hoped that Revie's creativity would help the Peacocks to turn their poor form around and appointed him as captain. Leeds avoided relegation in the 1958–59 season, but new manager Jack Taylor took Leeds down in the 1959–60 campaign with the division's worst defensive record. Revie recognised his playing days were coming to an end and relinquished the captaincy to Freddie Goodwin.

== International career ==
In October 1953, he was called up to The Football League XI to face the League of Ireland XI at Maine Road, and scored a hat-trick in a 9–1 victory. He went on to play for the England B team in March 1954. He scored on his England debut on 2 October 1954, in a 2–0 British Home Championship victory over Northern Ireland at Windsor Park. He also scored during his second appearance on 2 April 1955, a 7–2 victory over Scotland at Wembley Stadium. He made three further appearances that year, playing in defeats to France at the Stade Olympique Yves-du-Manoir and Wales at Ninian Park, and scoring twice in a 5–1 win over Denmark at Idrætsparken. His sixth and final cap came in a 1–1 draw with Northern Ireland on 6 October 1956.

He was one of many signatories in a letter to The Times on 17 July 1958, opposing "the policy of apartheid" in international sport and defending "the principle of racial equality which is embodied in the Declaration of the Olympic Games".

== Management career ==
=== Leeds United ===
Revie was made player-manager at Leeds United in March 1961 following the resignation of Jack Taylor, who left after Leeds found themselves struggling in the Second Division. He had initially applied for the vacant job at Bournemouth & Boscombe Athletic, but they were unable to find the £6,000 Leeds demanded, and the Leeds directors decided to appoint Revie as manager instead. At the time the club was in debt and was located in a rugby league territory, with very little football tradition. Fewer than 7,000 turned out for the final home game of the 1960–61 season, while Leeds Rhinos' championship game of the 1960–61 Rugby League season had an attendance of over 50,000. He immediately began to institute radical changes, such as ensuring the players stayed at higher-quality hotels. He instilled a "family atmosphere" at Elland Road, making sure to take an interest in the lives of everyone at the club, from the cleaning staff to the star players and ensuring there were no "big egos" at the club. He showed trust in his players, leaving them mainly to their own devices, though he always made sure he was fully informed as to what they were up to off the pitch, even going so far as to tell them to dump their girlfriends if he viewed them as unsuitable. He also introduced lengthy dossiers on opposing teams to ensure his players knew every detail about the opposition and were able to exploit weaknesses and nullify threats. Other changes were based on some of his many superstitions, such as his belief that birds were bad luck which resulted in him getting rid of the owl on the club badge and the discontinuation of the "Peacocks" nickname in favour of the "Whites".

Leeds struggled in the 1961–62 season, as aside from Billy Bremner and Jack Charlton, his playing squad was filled with journeymen pros; he did though inherit a good coaching staff that included Les Cocker, Maurice Lindley and Syd Owen who would all spend many years with Revie at Leeds. He developed a youth policy at the club, notable graduates of which would be Eddie Gray, Norman Hunter, Peter Lorimer and Paul Reaney. He had a difficult task in persuading young players to join Leeds over more glamorous clubs. Still, he made sure he put in extra effort to make the youngsters feel happy at Leeds, and in one instance, drove to Scotland to talk to Bremner's girlfriend to successfully persuade her to encourage Bremner to stay at Leeds rather than return to Scotland to be with her. Revie played his last game in March 1962 before concentrating entirely on management.

After new investment at board level, Revie was able to spend £25,000 on Everton's Scotland international Bobby Collins, who he installed as captain. Other arrivals included former Manchester City teammate Billy McAdams, forward Ian Lawson and left-back Cliff Mason. He spent £53,000 to bring John Charles back from Juventus. Though he proved not to be as effective as during his first spell at Leeds, Revie was able to sell him on to Roma for a £17,000 profit within just a few months. Leeds pushed for promotion in 1962–63, but the harsh winter caused many postponements and a backlog of games at the end of the season proved too much for Leeds, who fell away to finish in fifth place.

United secured promotion as champions of the Second Division in the 1963–64 season, helped by the late signing of striker Alan Peacock from Middlesbrough for £53,000. However, the overly physical approach typified by captain Collins earned Leeds a reputation as "dirty" that would shadow the club throughout Revie's tenure as manager and continue to this day. Leeds adapted well to the First Division early in the 1964–65 campaign but caused controversy in Collins's return to Goodison Park as the game against Everton descended into a brawl. The referee ordered the players off the field after 35 minutes to prevent further violence. Leeds went on to maintain a strong title challenge, finishing second to rivals Manchester United on goal average after failing to beat Birmingham City on the last day of the season. They also reached the final of the FA Cup, losing 2–1 to Liverpool at Wembley after extra-time.

Revie felt he did not have to strengthen his squad for the 1965–66 campaign, and made no new signings. With Leeds in the Inter-Cities Fairs Cup he showed his gamesmanship, sending his team out against Italian club Torino wearing unfamiliar numbers in an attempt to confuse the Italian club's tight man-marking system. However, Collins had his leg broken by Torino's Fabrizio Poletti, meaning Revie had to partner Giles and Bremner in central midfield and sign Huddersfield Town winger Michael O'Grady for £30,000. Although Collins would be missed, the partnership of Giles and Bremner would prove highly effective. Leeds again finished second in the league, trailing Liverpool by six points. They reached the semi-finals of the Inter-Cities Fairs Cup, losing on aggregate to Spanish side Real Zaragoza despite Revie ordering the fire brigade to flood the pitch before the replay at Elland Road.

Leeds struggled at the start of the 1966–67 season, though despite winning just three of their opening eleven games, they finished in fourth place. They reached the semi-finals of the FA Cup, losing 1–0 to Chelsea at Villa Park. They reached the final of the Inter-Cities Fairs Cup against Yugoslavian side Dinamo Zagreb, but were unable to scout the opposition due to Syd Owen having his flight cancelled on him; Leeds lost 2–0 on aggregate and Revie was criticised for his negative tactics.

With his team coming close but failing to land a trophy, he brought in a gypsy to lift a curse he believed had been placed on Elland Road so that there would be no bad luck for the 1967–68 season. A more practical measure he took to increase United's fortunes was to nearly double the club's record transfer to buy Sheffield United centre-forward Mick Jones for £100,000, who would replace the frequently injured Peacock as the main striker. Soon after the purchase, Leeds recorded a 7–0 victory over Chelsea, though ironically, Jones was not on the score sheet. Revie's first trophy would be the League Cup, as they eliminated Luton Town, Bury, Sunderland, Stoke City and Derby County to reach the final against Arsenal; Terry Cooper scored the only goal of what was a dour and tense final as Revie told his players to "shut up shop" and defend their 1–0 lead. This success did not immediately translate into league and FA Cup success, however, as they finished in fourth place and were beaten in the FA Cup semi-finals by Everton. They instead reached a second successive Inter-Cities Fairs Cup final, beating Spora (Luxembourg), Partizan (Yugoslavia), Hibernian (Scotland), Rangers (Scotland), and Dundee (Scotland) to reach the final against Hungarian club Ferencvárosi. Leeds won the first leg 1–0 and a month later defended their lead with a 0–0 draw in Budapest, by which time Jimmy Greenhoff, a substitute in the first leg, had been sold to Birmingham City.

Having found success in domestic and European cup competitions, Revie focused exclusively on the league for the 1968–69 campaign. They went the rest of the season unbeaten in the league following a 5–1 defeat to Burnley at Turf Moor on 19 October, and secured the title with a 0–0 draw with challengers Liverpool at Anfield; after the game Revie led his team back out onto the pitch to applaud the Liverpool supporters, who in turn applauded the Leeds team. His team set several records: most points (67), most wins (27), fewest defeats (2), and most home points (39); a still-unbroken club record is their 34 match unbeaten run that extended into the following season.

Revie strengthened his front line by breaking the British transfer record with a £165,000 purchase of Allan Clarke from Leicester City, who would partner Mick Jones up front. This allowed him to sell O'Grady to Wolverhampton Wanderers for £80,000 and move Lorimer to a more attacking role. He targeted the treble in 1969–70 and came close to achieving his aim only to fail on all three fronts in a congested close season, finishing second in the league to Everton, losing the 1970 FA Cup final to Chelsea (after a replay), and exiting the European Cup with a semi-final defeat to Celtic in front of a competition record crowd of 136,505 at Hampden Park.

Rejecting a £100,000 four-year contract offer to manage Birmingham City, Revie elected to remain at Leeds and stick with the same squad for the 1970–71 campaign. Leeds and Arsenal soon pulled away from the rest of the pack, though it would be the Gunners who would claim the league title, finishing one point ahead of Leeds after the latter lost to West Bromwich Albion following a controversial offside goal in front of the Match of the Day television cameras late in the season. United were embarrassed in the FA Cup, being knocked out by Fourth Division side Colchester United in a famous "giant-killing". Leeds again found success in the Inter-Cities Fairs Cup though, beating Sarpsborg (Norway), Dynamo Dresden (East Germany), Sparta Prague (Czechoslovakia), Vitória (Portugal) and Liverpool to reach the final against Juventus. They drew 2–2 at the Stadio Olimpico di Torino before claiming the trophy on away goals after a 1–1 draw at Elland Road.

The previous season's defeat to West Bromwich Albion led to Revie criticising referee Ray Tinkler. As punishment, Leeds were forced to play their first four home games of the 1971–72 season at a neutral venue; they played at Huddersfield's Leeds Road and boasted four wins and two draws from the opening seven matches. Leeds played good football, particularly winning praise for their 7–0 and 6–1 wins over Southampton and Nottingham Forest respectively, but again could only finish as runners-up after a late collapse and final day defeat at Wolves, allowing Derby County to claim the title by a single point. Revie had attempted to strengthen his squad before the final run-in with a £177,000 bid for Asa Hartford, but the deal was cancelled by the medical team who spotted a heart defect in the attacker's medical records. United reached the 1972 FA Cup final after beating Bristol Rovers, Liverpool, Cardiff City, Tottenham Hotspur and Birmingham City, and lifted the trophy after a 1–0 victory over Arsenal in the final.

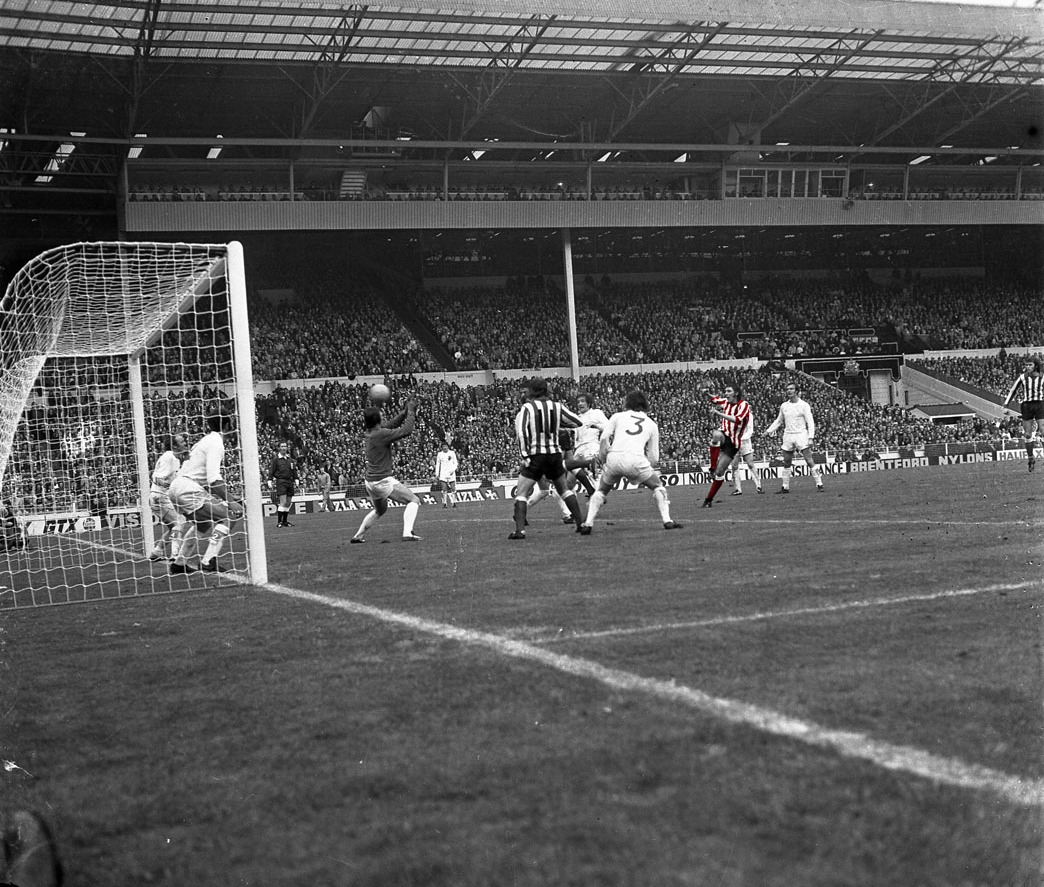
The 1973 FA Cup final which Leeds surprisingly lost to Second Division Sunderland.

Looking for a successor to Jack Charlton, early in the 1972–73 season, he signed Gordon McQueen from St Mirren for £30,000. He also spent £100,000 on defender Trevor Cherry and £35,000 on centre-half Roy Ellam, both from Huddersfield Town, and started playing young Scottish forward Joe Jordan more regularly. Leeds again came close to a Treble, but their league title campaign tailed off and they finished third, some seven points behind champions Liverpool. They did reach the 1973 FA Cup final to face Second Division Sunderland, but despite manager turned pundit Brian Clough's remark that "there is no way Sunderland can beat Leeds", United lost 1–0. Leeds also reached the final of the European Cup Winners' Cup against Italian club A.C. Milan at the Kaftanzoglio Stadium, where they were beaten 1–0. The match saw a controversial refereeing performance from Christos Michas, which eventually saw Norman Hunter get sent off after he reacted badly to being consistently fouled by pushing Gianni Rivera to the ground. In 2009, Yorkshire and the Humber MEP Richard Corbett unsuccessfully petitioned the European Parliament to reverse the result of the match over allegations that Michas accepted a bribe from the Italian side.

Revie was offered a five-year £100,000 contract (plus £50,000 signing-on fee) by Everton in the summer, but remained with Leeds after the move broke down due to a new law introduced in Parliament that prevented wage rises to curb inflation. He chose to continue with largely the same line-up for the 1973–74 season. He told his squad that the aim for the season would be to go unbeaten throughout the campaign. Though Leeds failed to achieve this as they lost three successive games in February/March, they did secure the title with a five-point lead over Liverpool. Completely focused on the league, and finally accepting that he was asking too much of his players to try and win every competition he played weakened teams to allow an early exit from the UEFA Cup. He chose to take the job of England national football team manager ahead of leading a European Cup challenge at Leeds and breaking up the aging team he had stuck with for many years, and though he was well loved at the club he was not popular with the Leeds boardroom members, who appointed Brian Clough, a fierce critic of Revie, as his successor. Despite lasting just 44 days in the job, Clough spent more in transfer fees than Revie had in his 13 years at the club.

=== England ===
In July 1974, Revie accepted the offer of the England manager's job, succeeding Alf Ramsey and caretaker-manager Joe Mercer. The Football Association, particularly Ted Croker, were impressed with Revie's personality and ideas. He was a popular appointment with the press and supporters; noted journalist Brian Glanville wrote that "Revie was the obvious choice". Revie attempted to build a relationship with the media, and also invited 81 prospective and established England players to a meeting in Manchester to make everyone feel included, where he announced that he would establish extra pay for international players as well as bonus payments for wins and draws. He held a meeting with Alan Hardaker, chairman of the Football League, but Hardaker had long resented Revie and was very reluctant to accept his proposal to rearrange league fixtures to benefit the England team. He also had difficult relationships with figures within the FA, most notoriously with chairman Sir Harold Thompson, who allegedly attempted to influence Revie's team selections and undermine him publicly. As well as this he found difficulty in his attempts to introduce the Leeds traditions into the England camp, such as carpet bowls and bingo, which were met with resentment and disdain by some England internationals. Colin Todd stated that Revie was ill-suited to the England job, with his strengths lying in the day-to-day contact found only in club management rather than the politics and committee meetings of international management.

For UEFA Euro 1976, England were drawn in a tough qualification group including Czechoslovakia, Portugal and Cyprus, with only the winner progressing to the finals. England began the campaign well with a 3–0 victory over Czechoslovakia at Wembley, Mick Channon and Colin Bell scoring the goals. However, a 0–0 home draw with Portugal was a minor setback, despite Malcolm Macdonald scoring all the goals in a 5–0 win over Cyprus following a morale-boosting 2–0 friendly win over 1974 FIFA World Cup champions West Germany. Kevin Keegan scored the only goal of the game at the Tsirion Stadium to secure maximum points in Cyprus and leave England in a strong position going into the two tough final group games in Czechoslovakia and Portugal. Though only drawing with Wales and Northern Ireland, a 5–1 victory over Scotland secured England the 1974–75 British Home Championship title and left England in confident mood for the crucial qualifying games. However, despite Channon opening the scoring, they fell to a 2–1 defeat to the Czechoslovaks in Bratislava after playing with what was for Revie uncharacteristic attacking tactics. A 1–1 draw in Lisbon then allowed Czechoslovakia to clinch the group with a win over Cyprus. Czechoslovakia then went on to win the whole tournament. Revie was criticised for his constant changing of players during the qualifying group, particularly his decision to drop captains Emlyn Hughes and Alan Ball from his squad entirely, his mistrust of flair players like Charlie George and Alan Hudson, and his willingness to play players out of position.

With England unseeded, Revie was handed opponents for qualifying for the 1978 World Cup of Italy, Finland and Luxembourg. Only the winner would progress to the finals. Just before the campaign began, England suffered a 2–1 defeat to Scotland to finish second in the 1975–76 British Home Championship. England made heavy work of both Finland and Luxembourg, winning 4–1 away and 2–1 at home against the Finns and 5–0 at home and 2–0 away against the Luxembourgers. The failure to inflict heavier defeats on these sides was ultimately the reason why Italy qualified for the finals on goal difference alone. England fell to a 2–0 defeat in Rome, where Revie was criticised for his previously untested back four selection of Emlyn Hughes, Dave Clement, Roy McFarland, and Mick Mills; he also played Trevor Brooking out of position and surprised many by selecting Stan Bowles ahead of Stuart Pearson. Sensing that he was disliked by FA chairman Sir Harold Thompson, and with further criticism coming his way after England could only finish third in the 1976–77 British Home Championship, Revie began to look for a way out. He missed a friendly with Brazil in Rio de Janeiro for what he claimed was a scouting assignment on the Italians, when in fact he had travelled to Dubai for contract negotiations with the United Arab Emirates. Revie asked for his contract with England to be cancelled but the FA refused although they offered Revie their full support despite having already approached Bobby Robson to replace him. The game with Brazil ended in a 0–0 draw, and their tour of South America concluded with draws with Argentina and Uruguay. On 12 July 1977, Revie revealed in an exclusive to the Daily Mail that he was quitting the England job to become manager of the UAE. The FA suspended Revie from football for ten years on a charge of bringing the game into disrepute; Revie contested his suspension in a lawsuit against the FA, and the court overturned the suspension after ruling that the FA had overreached its powers.

"I sat down with my wife, Elsie, one night and we agreed that the England job was no longer worth the aggravation. It was bringing too much heartache to those nearest to us. Nearly everyone in the country wants me out. So, I am giving them what they want. I know people will accuse me of running away, and it does sicken me that I cannot finish the job by taking England to the World Cup finals in Argentina next year, but the situation has become impossible."

— Revie's revelation to the Daily Mail under the headline "Revie Quits Over Aggro".

When Revie departed, England were two points behind Italy in the qualification group, with two matches remaining, including an encounter with the Italians at Wembley. Revie's replacement Ron Greenwood led the national team to victory in both remaining matches. England thus finished level with the Italians on points but behind them on goal difference. Since only the winner of the group qualified for the finals, England missed their second consecutive World Cup tournament.

=== Middle East ===
His contract at the United Arab Emirates ensured him a £340,000 four-year contract, though caused irreparable damage to his reputation in England. Selling the story to the Daily Mail also earned him £20,000, but only furthered the criticism that he was a "mercenary". In April 1979 the UAE finished sixth in the seven-team 5th Arabian Gulf Cup in Iraq, but it was his work in helping to improve the footballing facilities in the country in the long-term that were more important, helping the UAE qualify for the 1990 FIFA World Cup. He left the UAE coaching role in May 1980 as the UAE searched for an Arabic speaking manager. He returned to club management with Dubai club Al-Nasr of the UAE Arabian Gulf League, but was sacked in 1984 with the club sitting third in the league. The next year he had a brief stint with Egyptian Premier League club Al-Ahly of Cairo, but did not settle in Egypt and returned home to England. He was approached to replace Alan Mullery as Queens Park Rangers manager by chairman Jim Gregory, but the deal was not completed, and Revie never worked in football again.

== Personal life ==
Revie married Elsie, the niece of Leicester City's Scottish manager Johnny Duncan, on 17 October 1949. They had a son and a daughter. Elsie died of cancer on 28 March 2005 at the age of 77.

He published an autobiography, Soccer's Happy Wanderer, in 1955. He was appointed an OBE for his services to football. In April 1974, shortly before departing from Leeds for the England job, Revie was a special guest on the TV guest show This Is Your Life. Revie was an active freemason attending Leodiensis Lodge No. 4029 based at Westbourne House in Otley from 1965 until his death.

=== Illness and death ===
After living in Surrey for two years, Revie moved to Kinross, Scotland, in 1986, where he intended to spend his retirement. He was diagnosed with motor neurone disease in May 1987. He publicly announced his illness in August of that year and made his final public appearance on 11 May 1988 at Elland Road in a wheelchair, at a charity football match held to raise money for research into the disease. He died in Murrayfield Hospital in Edinburgh on 26 May 1989, aged 61, and was cremated four days later at Warriston Crematorium in Edinburgh. Though his funeral was well attended by representatives of Leeds United and many others involved in football such as Kevin Keegan, Brian Moore, Lawrie McMenemy, Denis Law and Alex Ferguson, The Football Association did not send any representatives.

== Legacy ==
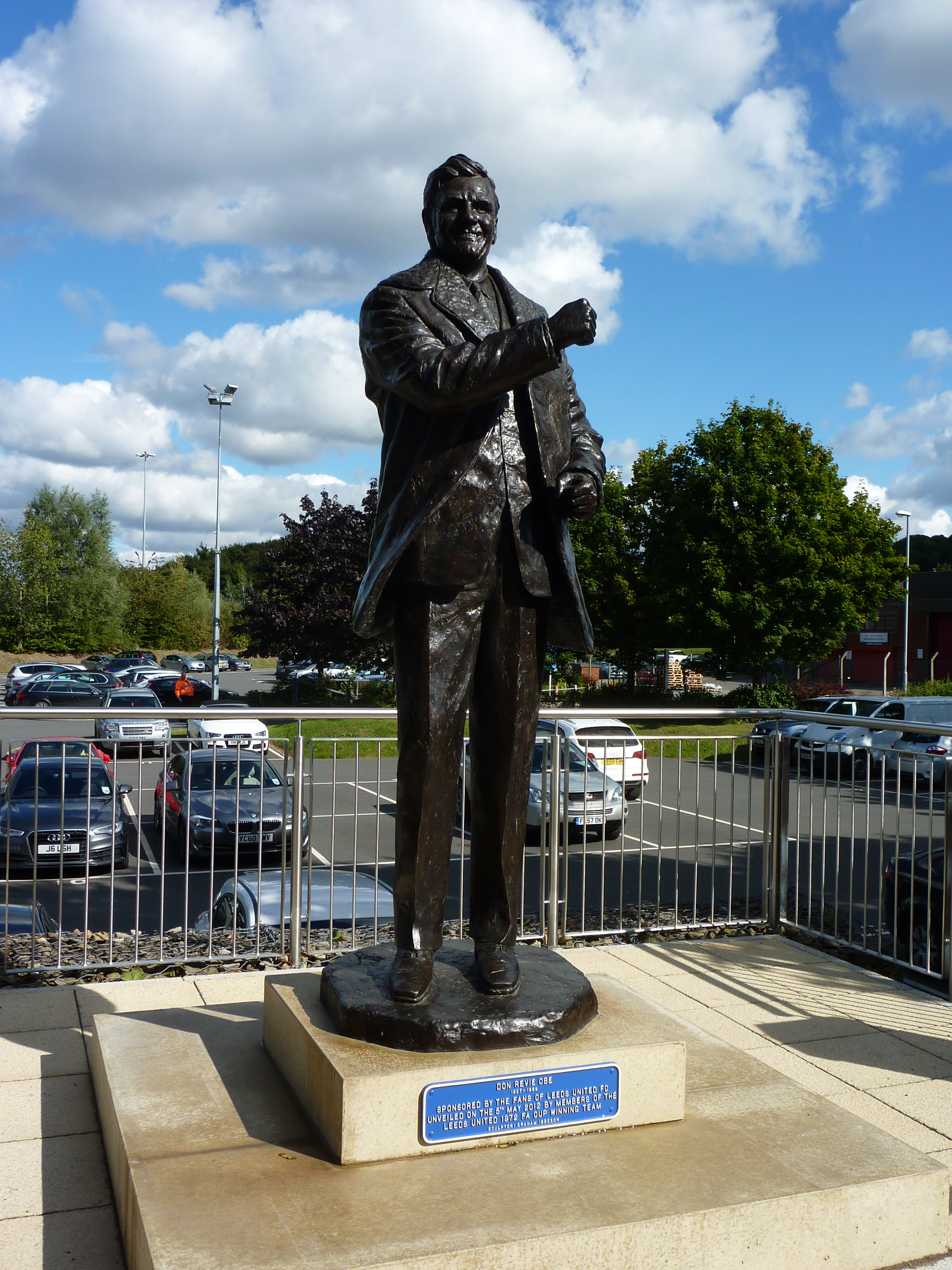
Statue of Don Revie outside Elland Road

The family atmosphere Revie instilled at Elland Road ensured that many Leeds United players remained friends and fiercely loyal to Revie long after their playing days had ended; his players also generally avoided financial, addiction or family problems, enjoying largely stable lives even after retirement. In May 2012, a statue of Revie was unveiled outside Elland Road. The North Stand of Elland Road is formally known as the Revie Stand.

In a survey of leading football writers, historians and academics by Total Sport magazine, Revie's Leeds United was voted one of the 50 greatest football teams of all time. James Corbett of the Guardian wrote that Revie "had been the most innovative manager of his generation" and "not until Arsène Wenger would a manager exert such a profound influence on his club - and the English game as a whole".

=== Criticism ===
==== "Dirty Leeds" ====
The combative nature of his teams earned United the moniker of "dirty Leeds", as key player Eddie Gray admitted that "it was brutal stuff and, definitely win-at-all-costs". Alan Peacock said that one of the attractions for joining Leeds was that he would not have to play against them and "then they won't be kicking me". In 1963 Leeds were labelled by the Football Association's own FA News as "the dirtiest [team] in the Football League". On more than one occasion referees had to order Leeds players off the pitch for a break mid-match to break up mass brawls. His teams were notorious for dour play and playing to defend 1–0 leads, though he allowed a more attacking style later in his career. Nevertheless, the unpopularity and poor reputation stuck with Leeds throughout Revie's time as manager and afterwards. George Best said that he "hated playing against them" and that the only time he needed to wear shinpads was when he was playing against Leeds.

One of Revie's most notable critics was Brian Clough, who initially gave some degree of praise to Leeds following the 1969–70 season in which Clough managed Derby County to fourth place, commenting that "they have made the season". However, Clough's attitude soon changed as the competition between their clubs intensified, and in subsequent seasons he would use his newspaper columns to attack Revie and Leeds. A particular example of this was in August 1973 in which he branded the Leeds players "cheats" and called for the club to be relegated to the Second Division on disciplinary grounds, though Clough would surprisingly succeed Revie as Leeds manager in 1974 in an ill-fated tenure that lasted only 44 days. In 2009, Revie was portrayed by Colm Meaney in the film The Damned United, which focused on Clough's reign as manager of Leeds United.

"When people talk about Leeds being dirty, they forget that was the culture back then. You had to look after yourself. There were so many players around who would now be suspended all season long. We just made sure nobody ever managed to bully us."

— Johnny Giles defending Leeds' approach to games.

==== Allegations of financial misconduct ====
Revie's reputation suffered in the late 1970s after his highly controversial England resignation. Both the Daily Mirror and The Sunday People claimed that Revie had attempted to bribe Wolverhampton Wanderers players to lose a crucial match in May 1972. The papers quoted Wolves midfielder Danny Hegan and former Leeds United goalkeeper Gary Sprake's claims that Revie's captain Billy Bremner had tried to arrange a bribe. Bremner sued for libel and won £100,000 libel damages and legal costs after both Hegan and Sprake refused to repeat their allegations under oath in court. Wolves player Derek Dougan, who had scored against Leeds in the match, testified that he had heard no mention of the alleged bribes. Neither the police nor FA investigations found any evidence of wrongdoing.

Bob Stokoe would later claim that while managing Bury on Good Friday 1962, Revie had offered him a bribe of £500 to "go easy" on his Leeds side who were at the time struggling against relegation to the Third Division and that he had become enraged when Revie responded to his refusal to accept the bribe by asking "in that case, may I speak to your players?" Alan Ball also alleged that Revie made an illegal approach for him, and despite pocketing the £300 bribe, he signed for Everton instead of Leeds; both men were charged with bringing the game into disrepute. The allegations of corruption earned him the nickname of "Don Readies". Though Mr Justice Cantley lifted the FA's ten-year ban on Revie, during his conclusion of the case the judge said that Revie "lacked candour", was "greedy" and "prickly", focused on "imagined wrongs" and his resignation as England manager showed a "sensational, outrageous example of disloyalty, breach of trust, discourtesy and selfishness".

== Career statistics ==
=== Club ===
Appearances and goals by club, season and competition
Club	Season	League			FA Cup		League Cup		Other		Total	
Club	Season	Division	Apps	Goals	Apps	Goals	Apps	Goals	Apps	Goals	Apps	Goals
Leicester City	1946–47	Second Division	32	7	6	0	—		—		38	7
Leicester City	1947–48	Second Division	15	2	0	0	—		—		15	2
Leicester City	1948–49	Second Division	36	16	8	4	—		—		44	20
Leicester City	1949–50	Second Division	13	0	0	0	—		—		13	0
Leicester City	Total		96	25	14	4	—		—		110	29
Hull City	1949–50	Second Division	22	0	3	1	—		—		25	1
Hull City	1950–51	Second Division	41	8	3	0	—		—		44	8
Hull City	1951–52	Second Division	13	4	0	0	—		—		13	4
Hull City	Total		76	12	6	1	—		—		82	13
Manchester City	1951–52	First Division	26	5	2	1	—		—		28	6
Manchester City	1952–53	First Division	32	6	3	0	—		—		35	6
Manchester City	1953–54	First Division	37	12	2	1	—		—		39	13
Manchester City	1954–55	First Division	32	8	6	2	—		—		38	10
Manchester City	1955–56	First Division	21	4	2	0	—		—		23	4
Manchester City	1956–57	First Division	14	2	0	0	—		1 (Note: Appearance in FA Charity Shield)	0	15	2
Manchester City	Total		162	37	15	4	—		1	0	178	41
Sunderland	1956–57	First Division	16	2	0	0	—		—		16	2
Sunderland	1957–58	First Division	39	12	2	0	—		—		41	12
Sunderland	1958–59	Second Division	9	1	0	0	—		—		9	1
Sunderland	Total		64	15	2	0	—		—		66	15
Leeds United	1958–59	First Division	20	2	1	0	—		—		21	2
Leeds United	1959–60	First Division	35	7	0	0	—		—		35	7
Leeds United	1960–61	Second Division	14	1	0	0	3	1	—		17	2
Leeds United	1961–62	Second Division	7	1	0	0	0	0	—		7	1
Leeds United	Total		76	11	1	0	3	1	—		80	12
Career total			474	100	38	9	3	1	1	0	516	110

=== International ===
Appearances and goals by national team and year
National team	Year	Apps	Goals
England
England	1954	1	1
England	1955	4	3
England	1956	1	0
Total		6	4

Scores and results list England's goal tally first, score column indicates score after each Revie goal.

List of international goals scored by Don Revie
No.	Date	Venue	Opponent	Score	Result	Competition
1	2 October 1954	Windsor Park, Belfast, Northern Ireland	Northern Ireland	2–0	2–0	British Home Championship
2	2 April 1955	Wembley Stadium, London, England	Scotland	3–1	7–2	British Home Championship
3	2 October 1955	Idrætsparken, Copenhagen, Denmark	Denmark	1–0	5–1	Friendly
4	2 October 1955	Idrætsparken, Copenhagen, Denmark	Denmark	4–0	5–1	Friendly

=== Managerial statistics ===
Managerial record by team and tenure
Team	From	To	Record					Ref(s)
Team	From	To	G	W	D	L	Win %	Ref(s)
Leeds United	March 1961	July 1974	741	395	197	149	53.31	
England	July 1974	11 July 1977	29	14	8	7	48.28	
UAE	July 1977	July 1980	13	2	3	8	15.38	
Total			783	411	208	164	52.49	

== Honours ==
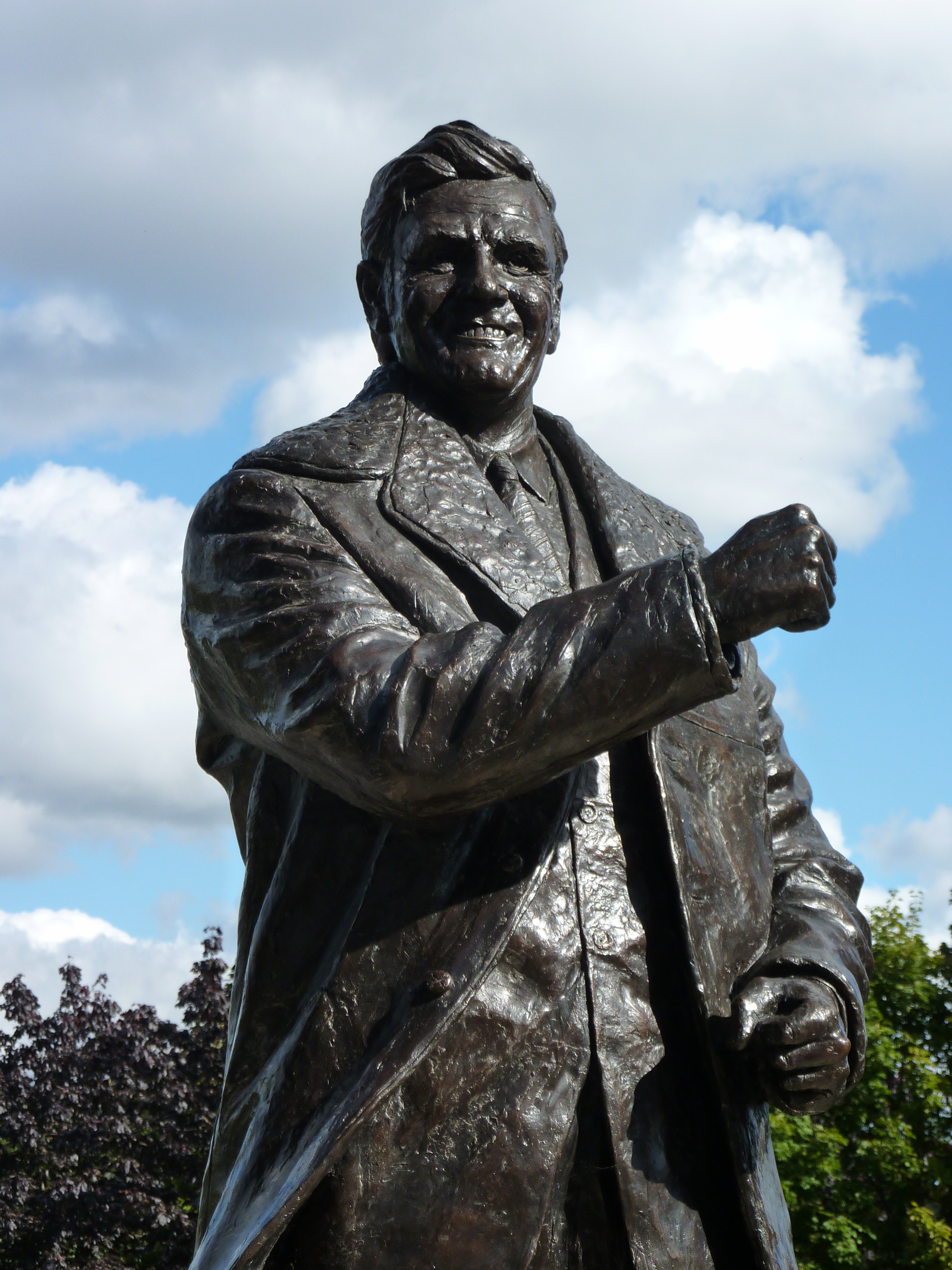
Don Revie statue outside Elland Road.

=== Player ===
Manchester City

- FA Cup: 1955–56; runner-up: 1954–55

England

- British Home Championship: 1954–55, 1955–56 (shared), 1956–57

=== Manager ===
Leeds United

- Football League First Division: 1968–69, 1973–74
- Football League Second Division: 1963–64
- FA Cup: 1971–72
- Football League Cup: 1967–68
- FA Charity Shield: 1969
- Inter-Cities Fairs Cup: 1967–68, 1970–71

England

- British Home Championship: 1974–75

=== Individual ===
- FWA Footballer of the Year: 1954–55
- Officer of the Order of the British Empire: 1969

== See also ==
- List of longest managerial reigns in association football
