= Syd Owen =

English footballer

Personal information
- Full name: Sydney William Owen
- Date of birth: 29 September 1922
- Place of birth: Aston, Birmingham, Warwickshire, England
- Date of death: 27 August 1998 (aged 75)
- Place of death: Leeds, West Yorkshire, England
- Position: Centre half

Youth career
- Birmingham YMCA
- Birmingham City

Senior career*
Years	Team	Apps	(Gls)
1945–1947	Birmingham City	5	(0)
1947–1959	Luton Town	388	(3)
Total		393	(3)

International career
1954	England	3	(0)
	Football League XI	2	(0)

Managerial career
- 1959–1960: Luton Town
- 1960–1975: Leeds United (first-team coach)
- 1975-1978: Birmingham City (assistant manager)
- 1978–1981: Manchester United (youth coach)
- * Club domestic league appearances and goals

Sydney William Owen (29 September 1922 – 27 August 1998) was an English football player and coach. He spent nearly all his playing career as a centre half for Luton Town.

Born in Birmingham to Florence Laura (née Whiley) and Henry Sydney Owen, Owen began his football career playing for the Birmingham YMCA team before joining Birmingham City as a youth player. After the end of the Second World War, he made it into the club's first team for the 1946–47 season, but played just five times in the Second Division and was allowed to leave at the end of the season.

Owen signed for Luton in June 1947. He played 388 league games for the club and 423 in all league and cup games, and after constant displays of natural ability in the 1949–50 season, was appointed as captain by manager Dally Duncan. He earned three caps for the England national football team in 1954, and selected as part of the squad for the 1954 FIFA World Cup, at which he appeared in England's first match, a 4–4 draw with Belgium. He also played twice for the Football League XI.

In 1959, his final season as a player, Owen was named the FWA Footballer of the Year. On 27 April 1959, he was appointed as player-manager of Luton following the departure of Dally Duncan six months earlier; Owen was therefore in charge of the club for the 1959 FA Cup Final against Nottingham Forest. As well as serving as manager for the match, he also captained the side from his position at centre half.

After less than a year in the job, a "fundamental disagreement on policy" led to his resignation on 23 April 1960. He later became first team coach of Leeds United under Jack Taylor and then Don Revie throughout the 1960s and 1970s, bringing with him trainer Les Cocker.

In 1978, he was hired by Manchester United manager Dave Sexton to be the club's youth coach. He remained in the position for three years until shortly after Sexton's departure from the club at the end of the 1980–81 season. Owen is credited with spotting the potential of Mark Hughes as a striker, having selected him for the youth team during his final season working at Old Trafford.

== Honours ==
Luton Town

- FA Cup runner-up: 1958–59
