= Brian Caswell (footballer) =

English footballer

Personal information
- Full name: Brian Leonard Caswell
- Date of birth: 14 February 1956 (age 70)
- Place of birth: Wednesbury, England
- Height: 5 ft 10 in (1.78 m)
- Position: Defender

Senior career*
Years	Team	Apps	(Gls)
1972–1985	Walsall	400	(17)
1985	Doncaster Rovers	15	(2)
1985–1986	Leeds United	9	(0)
1987	→ Wolverhampton Wanderers (loan)	1	(0)
Total		425	(19)
- * Club domestic league appearances and goals

Brian Leonard Caswell (born 14 February 1956) is an English former footballer who played in the Football League for Walsall, Doncaster Rovers, Leeds United and Wolverhampton Wanderers.

== Career ==
Caswell was born in Wednesbury and began his career with Walsall making his debut in the 1972–73 season. He became the regular in the "Saddlers" side whilst left back was the key position he was able to play in all outfield positions and was a key member of the side which lost narrowly to Liverpool in the semi-final of the League Cup in 1983–84. After racking up 400 league appearances for Walsall he joined Billy Bremner at Doncaster Rovers however in October 1985 Bremner joined Leeds United and the following month he signed Caswell for £30,000. Injuries disrupted his time at Elland Road and after spending a short time out on loan at Wolverhampton Wanderers he decided to retire from playing. He then joined Birmingham City's community team and then became youth coach. In 1992, he became youth coach at Stoke City until 1995 when he became assistant manager to Wayne Clarke at Telford United. He then returned to being youth coach at Northampton Town and Shrewsbury Town before leaving football in 2002 to work for BMW in Birmingham.

== Honours ==
Walsall

- Football League Fourth Division runner-up: 1979–80
