= FWA Footballer of the Year =

Annual award

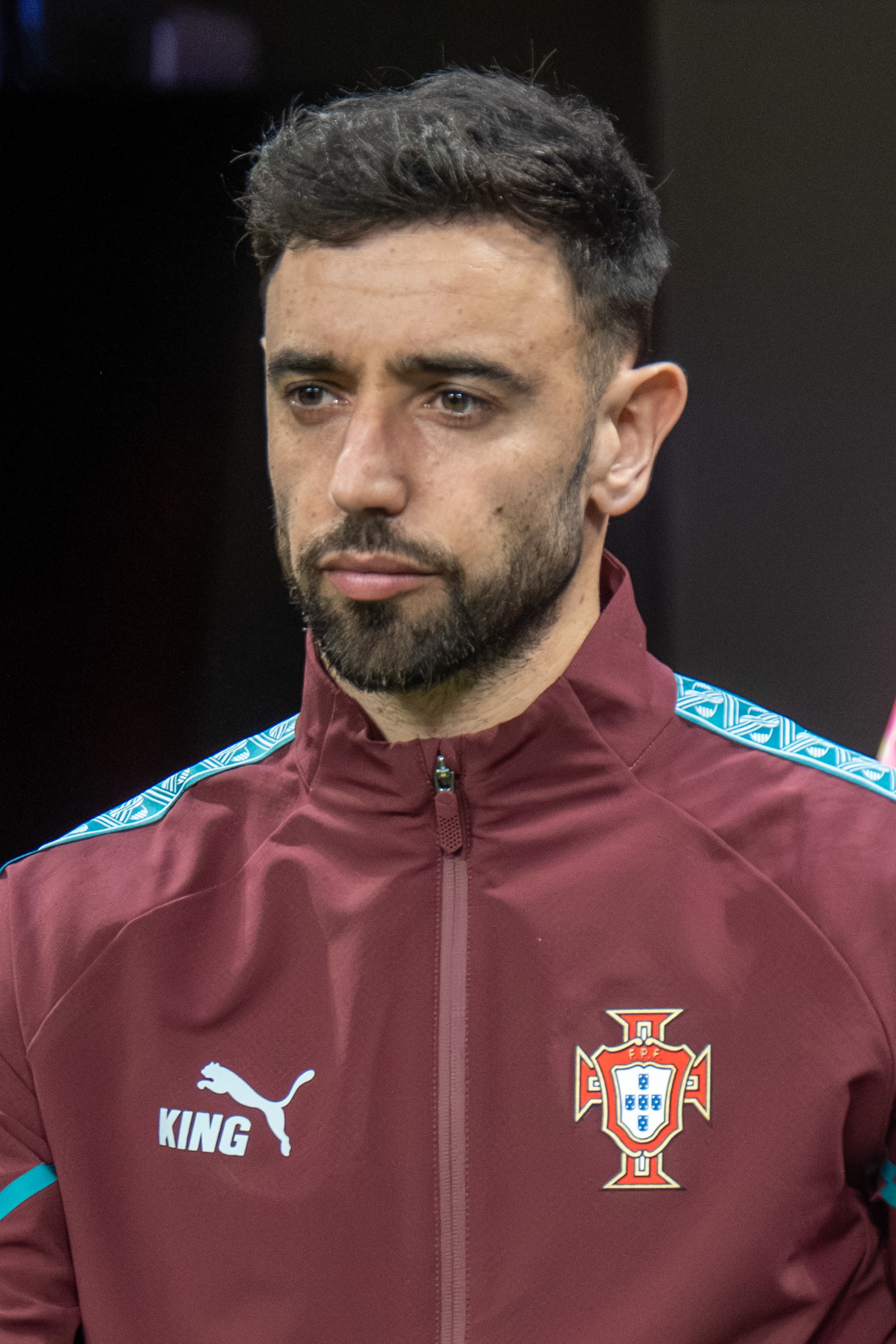
- Bruno Fernandes won the award in 2026.
- Sport: Association football
- Competition: All levels of English football
- Country: England and Wales
- Presented by: FWA

History
- First award: 1947–48
- Editions: 77
- First winner: (England) Stanley Matthews
- Most wins: (Egypt) Mohamed Salah (France) Thierry Henry (3 awards each)
- Most recent: (Portugal) Bruno Fernandes
- Website: footballwriters.co.uk/awards

The Football Writers' Association Footballer of the Year (often called the FWA Footballer of the Year, or in England simply the Footballer of the Year) is an annual award given to the player who is adjudged to have been the best of the season in English football. The award has been presented since the 1947–48 season, with the inaugural winner being Blackpool winger Stanley Matthews. The latest winner of the award as of 2025–26 is Bruno Fernandes of Manchester United. Nine players have won the award on more than one occasion, with Thierry Henry and Mohamed Salah having won the award on the most occasions, with three wins each.

The winner is selected by a vote amongst the members of the Football Writers' Association (FWA), which comprises around 400 football journalists based throughout England. The award was instigated at the suggestion of Charles Buchan, a former professional footballer turned journalist and one of the Association's founders.

== Winners ==
The award has been presented on 78 occasions as of 2026, to 69 players. On one occasion two players shared the award for a season. The table also indicates where the winning player also won one or more of the other major "player of the year" awards in English football, namely:

- the Professional Footballers' Association's Players' Player of the Year award (PPY),
- the Fans' Player of the Year award (FPY),
- the Young Player of the Year award (YPY),
- the Premier League Player of the Season award (PPS),
- the Premier League Young Player of the Season award (PYPS),
- and the Football Supporters' Association Player of the Year (FSA).

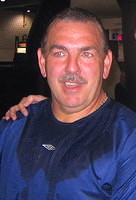
Neville Southall's 1985 win was the last time a goalkeeper received the award.

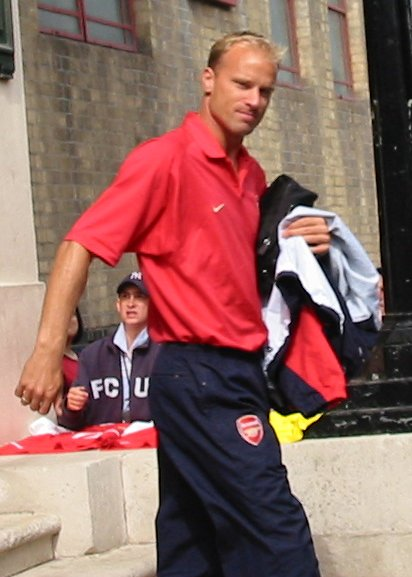
Dennis Bergkamp won the award in the 1997–98 season.

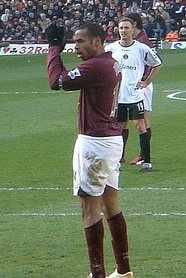
Thierry Henry was the first player to win the award in two consecutive seasons.

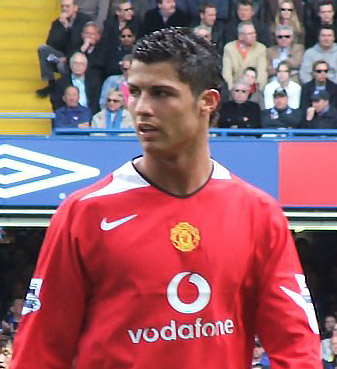
Cristiano Ronaldo also won the award consecutively, in the 2006–07 and 2007–08 seasons.

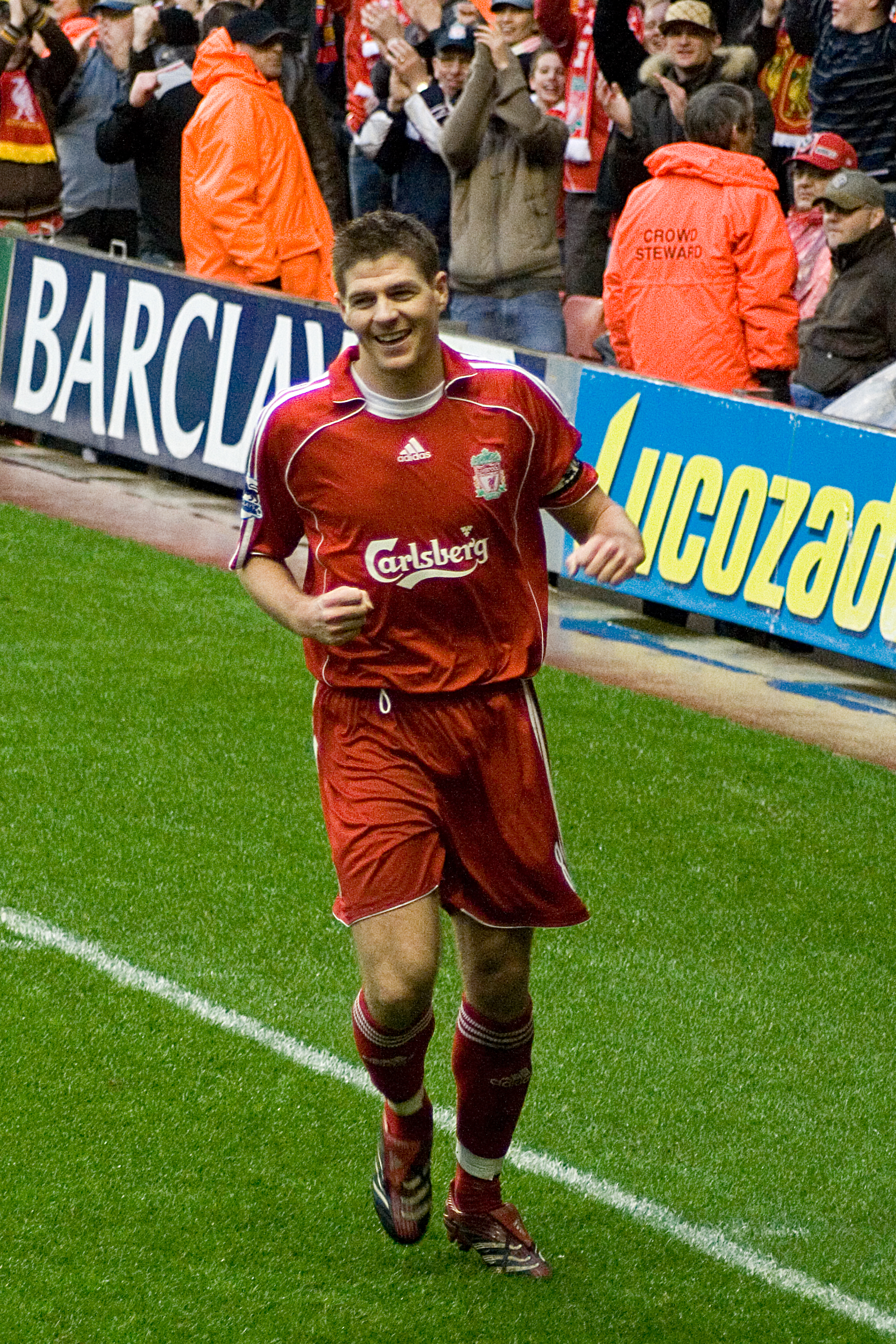
Steven Gerrard won the award in 2009, becoming the first Liverpool player to do so for nineteen years.

Winners of the FWA Footballer of the Year
Year	Nat.	Player	Club	Also won	Notes
1947–48	(England)	Stanley Matthews	Blackpool		
1948–49	(Republic of Ireland)	Johnny Carey	Manchester United		
1949–50	(England)	Joe Mercer	Arsenal		
1950–51	(England)	Harry Johnston	Blackpool		
1951–52	(England)	Billy Wright	Wolverhampton Wanderers		
1952–53	(England)	Nat Lofthouse	Bolton Wanderers		
1953–54	(England)	Tom Finney	Preston North End		
1954–55	(England)	Don Revie	Manchester City		
1955–56	(West Germany)	Bert Trautmann	Manchester City		
1956–57	(England)	Tom Finney (2)	Preston North End		
1957–58	(Northern Ireland)	Danny Blanchflower	Tottenham Hotspur		
1958–59	(England)	Syd Owen	Luton Town		
1959–60	(England)	Bill Slater	Wolverhampton Wanderers		
1960–61	(Northern Ireland)	Danny Blanchflower (2)	Tottenham Hotspur		
1961–62	(England)	Jimmy Adamson	Burnley		
1962–63	(England)	Stanley Matthews (2)	Stoke City		
1963–64	(England)	Bobby Moore	West Ham United		
1964–65	(Scotland)	Bobby Collins	Leeds United		
1965–66	(England)	Bobby Charlton	Manchester United		
1966–67	(England)	Jack Charlton	Leeds United		
1967–68	(Northern Ireland)	George Best	Manchester United		
1968–69	(England) (Scotland)	Tony Book; Dave Mackay	Manchester City; Derby County		
1969–70	(Scotland)	Billy Bremner	Leeds United		
1970–71	(Scotland)	Frank McLintock	Arsenal		
1971–72	(England)	Gordon Banks	Stoke City		
1972–73	(Northern Ireland)	Pat Jennings	Tottenham Hotspur		
1973–74	(England)	Ian Callaghan	Liverpool		
1974–75	(England)	Alan Mullery	Fulham		
1975–76	(England)	Kevin Keegan	Liverpool		
1976–77	(England)	Emlyn Hughes	Liverpool		
1977–78	(Scotland)	Kenny Burns	Nottingham Forest		
1978–79	(Scotland)	Kenny Dalglish	Liverpool		
1979–80	(England)	Terry McDermott	Liverpool	PPY	
1980–81	(Netherlands)	Frans Thijssen	Ipswich Town		
1981–82	(England)	Steve Perryman	Tottenham Hotspur		
1982–83	(Scotland)	Kenny Dalglish (2)	Liverpool	PPY	
1983–84	(Wales)	Ian Rush	Liverpool	PPY	
1984–85	(Wales)	Neville Southall	Everton		
1985–86	(England)	Gary Lineker	Everton	PPY	
1986–87	(England)	Clive Allen	Tottenham Hotspur	PPY	
1987–88	(England)	John Barnes	Liverpool	PPY	
1988–89	(Scotland)	Steve Nicol	Liverpool		
1989–90	(England)	John Barnes (2)	Liverpool		
1990–91	(Scotland)	Gordon Strachan	Leeds United		
1991–92	(England)	Gary Lineker (2)	Tottenham Hotspur		
1992–93	(England)	Chris Waddle	Sheffield Wednesday		
1993–94	(England)	Alan Shearer	Blackburn Rovers		
1994–95	(Germany)	Jürgen Klinsmann	Tottenham Hotspur		
1995–96	(France)	Eric Cantona	Manchester United		
1996–97	(Italy)	Gianfranco Zola	Chelsea		
1997–98	(Netherlands)	Dennis Bergkamp	Arsenal	PPY	
1998–99	(France)	David Ginola	Tottenham Hotspur	PPY	
1999–2000	(Republic of Ireland)	Roy Keane	Manchester United	PPY	
2000–01	(England)	Teddy Sheringham	Manchester United	PPY	
2001–02	(France)	Robert Pires	Arsenal		
2002–03	(France)	Thierry Henry	Arsenal	PPY, FPY	
2003–04	(France)	Thierry Henry (2)	Arsenal	PPY, FPY, PPS	
2004–05	(England)	Frank Lampard	Chelsea	FPY, PPS	
2005–06	(France)	Thierry Henry (3)	Arsenal	PPS	
2006–07	(Portugal)	Cristiano Ronaldo	Manchester United	PPY, FPY, YPY, PPS	
2007–08	(Portugal)	Cristiano Ronaldo (2)	Manchester United	PPY, FPY, PPS	
2008–09	(England)	Steven Gerrard	Liverpool	FPY	
2009–10	(England)	Wayne Rooney	Manchester United	PPY, FPY, PPS	
2010–11	(England)	Scott Parker	West Ham United		
2011–12	(Netherlands)	Robin van Persie	Arsenal	PPY, FPY	
2012–13	(Wales)	Gareth Bale	Tottenham Hotspur	PPY, YPY, PPS	
2013–14	(Uruguay)	Luis Suárez	Liverpool	PPY, FPY, PPS, FSA	
2014–15	(Belgium)	Eden Hazard	Chelsea	PPY, PPS	
2015–16	(England)	Jamie Vardy	Leicester City	PPS	
2016–17	(France)	N'Golo Kanté	Chelsea	PPY, PPS	
2017–18	(Egypt)	Mohamed Salah	Liverpool	PPY, FPY, PPS, FSA	
2018–19	(England)	Raheem Sterling	Manchester City	YPY	
2019–20	(England)	Jordan Henderson	Liverpool		
2020–21	(Portugal)	Rúben Dias	Manchester City	PPS	
2021–22	(Egypt)	Mohamed Salah (2)	Liverpool	PPY, FPY	
2022–23	(Norway)	Erling Haaland	Manchester City	PPY, PPS, PYPS	
2023–24	(England)	Phil Foden	Manchester City	PPY, PPS	
2024–25	(Egypt)	Mohamed Salah (3)	Liverpool	PPY, PPS	
2025–26	(Portugal)	Bruno Fernandes	Manchester United	PPY, PPS	

== Breakdown of winners ==
=== By country ===
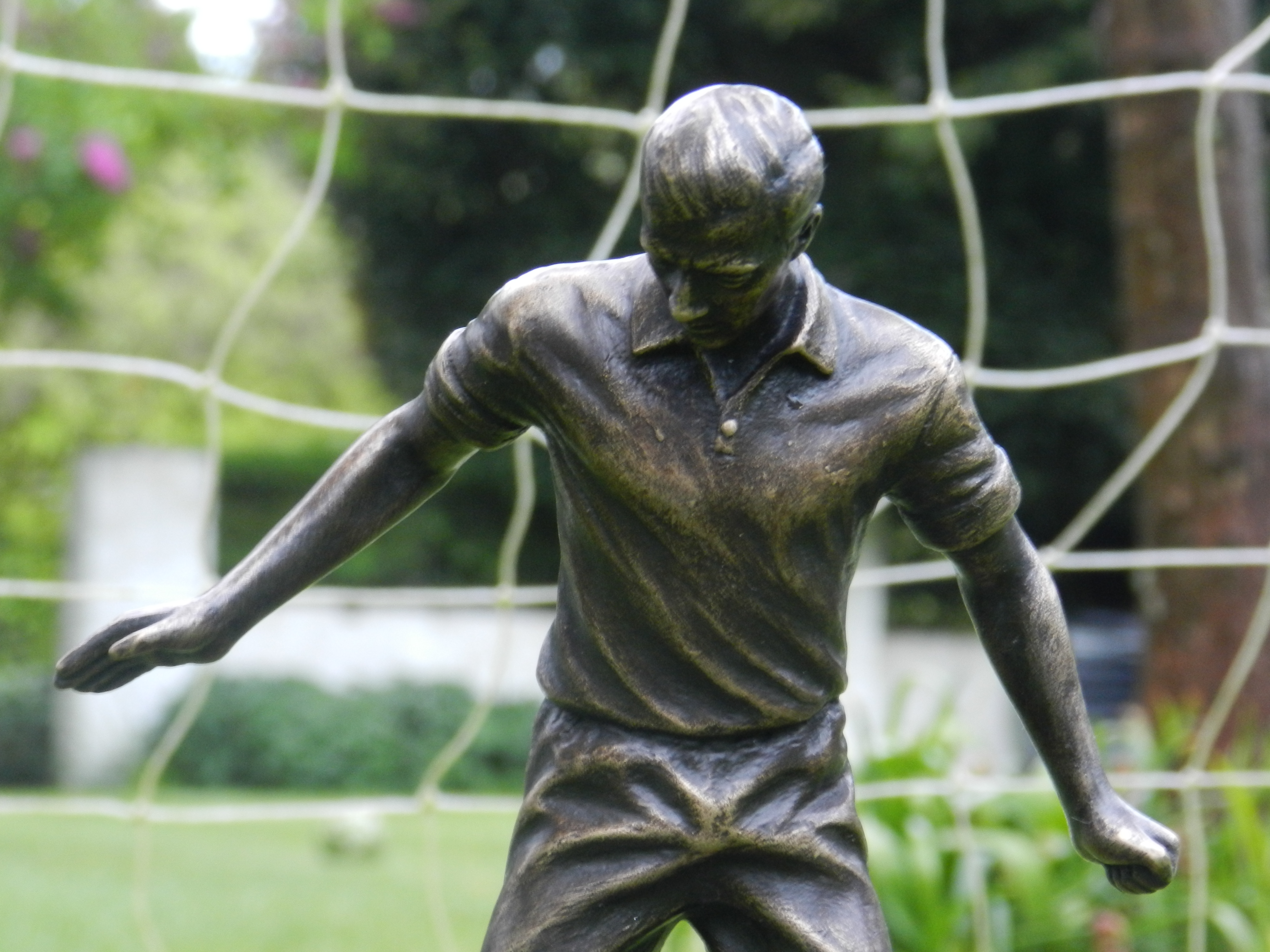
The trophy awarded to the Footballer of the Year from 2015 onwards

Winners of the FWA Footballer of the Year by country
Country	Number of wins	Winning years
England	39	1947–48, 1949–50, 1950–51, 1951–52, 1952–53, 1953–54, 1954–55, 1956–57, 1958–59, 1959–60, 1961–62, 1962–63, 1963–64, 1965–66, 1966–67, 1968–69^{‡}, 1971–72, 1973–74, 1974–75, 1975–76, 1976–77, 1979–80, 1981–82, 1985–86, 1986–87, 1987–88, 1989–90, 1991–92, 1992–93, 1993–94, 2000–01, 2004–05, 2008–09, 2009–10, 2010–11, 2015–16, 2018–19, 2019–20, 2023-24
Scotland	9	1964–65, 1968–69^{‡}, 1969–70, 1970–71, 1977–78, 1978–79, 1982–83, 1988–89, 1990–91
France	7	1995–96, 1998–99, 2001–02, 2002–03, 2003–04, 2005–06, 2016–17
Northern Ireland	4	1957–58, 1960–61, 1967–68, 1972–73
Portugal	4	2006–07, 2007–08, 2020–21, 2025–26
Netherlands	3	1980–81, 1997–98, 2011–12
Wales	3	1983–84, 1984–85, 2012–13
Egypt	3	2017–18, 2021–22, 2024–25
Republic of Ireland	2	1948–49, 1999–2000
West Germany / Germany	2	1955–56, 1994–95
Italy	1	1996–97
Uruguay	1	2013–14
Belgium	1	2014–15
Norway	1	2022–23

‡ — two winners

=== Winners by club ===
Winners of the FWA Footballer of the Year by club
Club	Number of wins	Winning years
Liverpool	16	1973–74, 1975–76, 1976–77, 1978–79, 1979–80, 1982–83, 1983–84, 1987–88, 1988–89, 1989–90, 2008–09, 2013–14, 2017–18, 2019–20, 2021–22, 2024–25
Manchester United	10	1948–49, 1965–66, 1967–68, 1995–96, 1999–00, 2000–01, 2006–07, 2007–08, 2009–10, 2025–26
Tottenham Hotspur	9	1957–58, 1960–61, 1972–73, 1981–82, 1986–87, 1991–92, 1994–95, 1998–99, 2012–13
Arsenal	8	1949–50, 1970–71, 1997–98, 2001–02, 2002–03, 2003–04, 2005–06, 2011–12
Manchester City	7	1954–55, 1955–56, 1968–69^{‡}, 2018–19, 2020–21, 2022–23, 2023-24
Leeds United	4	1964–65, 1966–67, 1969–70, 1990–91
Chelsea	4	1996–97, 2004–05, 2014–15, 2016–17
Everton	2	1984–85, 1985–86
Stoke City	2	1962–63, 1971–72
Wolverhampton Wanderers	2	1951–52, 1959–60
Preston North End	2	1953–54, 1956–57
Blackpool	2	1947–48, 1950–51
West Ham United	2	1963–64, 2010–11
Leicester City	1	2015–16
Blackburn Rovers	1	1993–94
Sheffield Wednesday	1	1992–93
Ipswich Town	1	1980–81
Nottingham Forest	1	1977–78
Fulham	1	1974–75
Derby County	1	1968–69^{‡}
Burnley	1	1961–62
Luton Town	1	1958–59
Bolton Wanderers	1	1952–53

== See also ==
- Premier League Player of the Season
- PFA Players' Player of the Year
- SPFA Players' Player of the Year
- SFWA Footballer of the Year
- PFAI Players' Player of the Year
