= Cliff Mason =

English footballer

Personal information
- Full name: Clifford Ernest Mason
- Date of birth: 27 November 1929
- Place of birth: York, England
- Date of death: August 2013 (aged 83)
- Position: Left back

Senior career*
Years	Team	Apps	(Gls)
1950–1952	Sunderland	0	(0)
1952–1955	Darlington	107	(0)
1955–1962	Sheffield United	97	(2)
1962–1963	Leeds United	31	(0)
1963–1964	Scunthorpe United	12	(1)
1964–1965	Chesterfield	5	(0)
- * Club domestic league appearances and goals

Clifford Ernest Mason (27 November 1929 – August 2013) was an English professional footballer who played as a left back for Darlington, Sheffield United, Leeds United, Scunthorpe United and Chesterfield in the 1950s and 1960s.

== Playing career ==
Mason was born in York. He began his professional career at Sunderland, but never represented them in the Football League, and moved on to Darlington in July 1952. He made 107 League appearances over three seasons, and then joined Sheffield United for 1955–56, where he became captain and made 97 appearances in six seasons. Leeds United manager Don Revie signed Mason, aged 31, during the 1961–62 season for £10,000 as an experienced defender who was needed during a troubled season for Leeds when they were fighting relegation to the Third Division. He appeared in the last eleven games of the season and made a further 22 appearances in the next, a total of 33 League and 2 League Cup matches, before Grenville Hair regained the left back spot. Mason joined Scunthorpe United for the 1963–64 season and joined Chesterfield for the following season. Mason died in August 2013 at the age of 83.
