= Les Cocker (footballer, born 1924) =

English footballer and coach

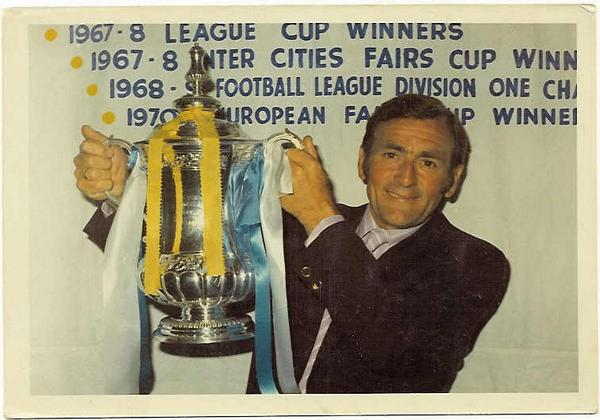
- Cocker holding the FA Cup in 1972

Personal information
- Date of birth: 13 March 1924
- Place of birth: Stockport, England
- Date of death: 4 October 1979 (aged 55)
- Place of death: Doncaster, England
- Position: Striker

Senior career*
Years	Team	Apps	(Gls)
1946–1953	Stockport County	173	(43)
1953–1958	Accrington Stanley	122	(48)
Total		295	(91)

Managerial career
- 1958–1960: Luton Town (Coach)
- 1960–1974: Leeds United (Coach)
- 1962–1974: England (Coach)
- 1974–1977: England (Assistant Manager)
- 1977–1979: United Arab Emirates (Assistant Manager)
- 1979: Doncaster Rovers (Coach)
- * Club domestic league appearances and goals

Les Cocker (13 March 1924 – 4 October 1979) was an English professional football player and coach. As a player, Cocker played as a striker for Stockport County and Accrington Stanley, making nearly 300 appearances in the English Football League. After retiring as a player, Cocker became a coach, working with club sides Luton Town and Leeds United, before working with the victorious England team at the 1966 World Cup.

== Early and personal life ==
Cocker was born in Stockport on 13 March 1924. During World War II, Cocker spent time with the Reconnaissance Regiment in occupied France.

Cocker was married to Nora and had three sons – David, Stephen and Ian.

== Career ==
=== Playing career ===
Cocker began his professional career with Stockport County in 1946, scoring 43 goals in 173 League games between then and 1953. Cocker then played with Accrington Stanley, scoring 48 goals in 122 League games between 1953 and 1958. In his professional playing career, Cocker scored a total of 91 goals in 295 League games.

=== Coaching career ===
After retiring as a player in 1958, Cocker became a Coach at Luton Town. In 1960 Cocker moved to Leeds United, as one of the country's first FA Coaching Certificate holders. In 1962, Cocker was called up by England national team manager Walter Winterbottom to become a squad trainer, combining his national duties with those of his club. Cocker left Leeds in 1974 to become full-time Assistant Manager to Don Revie with the England national team. When Revie left in 1977 to become manager of the United Arab Emirates national team, Cocker followed as his assistant. Cocker returned to England in 1979 to become a coach at Doncaster Rovers under former Leeds legend Billy Bremner, but he died in October of that year aged 55.

==== 1966 World Cup ====
Cocker was also a Team Trainer with the victorious England squad at the 1966 World Cup. Despite the England team winning the competition, Cocker was not awarded a medal, and a posthumous campaign for Cocker to be awarded one was launched by his family in February 2008. The campaign attracted support from former Leeds players including Eddie Gray, Peter Lorimer and Johnny Giles, as well as British politicians including Gerry Sutcliffe and Richard Caborn. Cocker was eventually awarded a medal in June 2009, which was collected on his behalf by his family.
