= Russell Doig =

Scottish former footballer

Personal information
- Full name: Russell Doig
- Date of birth: 17 January 1964 (age 62)
- Place of birth: Millport, Cumbrae, Scotland
- Height: 5 ft 8 in (1.73 m)
- Position: Winger

Youth career
- 1981–1983: St Mirren

Senior career*
Years	Team	Apps	(Gls)
1983–1986	East Stirlingshire	109	(9)
1986–1988	Leeds United	6	(0)
1987	→ Peterborough United (loan)	7	(0)
1988–1990	Hartlepool United	33	(2)
- Nuneaton Borough
Total		155	(11)
- * Club domestic league appearances and goals

Russell Doig (born 17 January 1964) is a Scottish former footballer, who played for East Stirlingshire, Leeds United, Peterborough United and Hartlepool United.

He later played for Halifax Town, Harrogate Town, Nuneaton Borough, Farsley Celtic and joined Mossley in August 1994, where he made 10 appearances and scored one goal.
