= Carpet bowls =

Lawn bowls variant

Carpet bowls is a variant of lawn bowls played indoors. Originating in England, it is played particularly in the South of England, although it is played at League and County level in East Anglia, the Midlands and the North. There are also a few players in Eastern Townships, Quebec, Canada. Despite the name, carpet bowls is not just a trivial indoor game played at home.

There is a formal English Carpet Bowls Association, and although the ECBA is relatively small, the game itself is played in many village halls up and down the country. Around the turn of the century there were more than 1,000 clubs. In accordance with the village hall background, the bowls mat is smaller at around 30 x 6 feet, and the inventors clearly paid less emphasis upon trying to maintain all the rules of the Mother game. For instance, carpet bowls dispenses with the notion of a 'ditch' and various sometimes complex rules associated with it.

Bowls are delivered from an 18-inch-wide (460 mm) space at the front of the carpet and must avoid an 18-inch circular block placed in the centre of the carpet. The Jack is 2.5 inches in diameter (the same as for indoor bowls) and is placed on a centre line 3–6 feet from the end of the carpet.

Aficionados of carpet bowls are keen to point out that, because a bowl must be delivered within the 18-inch delivery area whilst not standing on the carpet, it is rare for players to attempt to "break up the head" (attempting to spoil the end by delivering a forceful bowl that knocks the bowls and jack randomly). Carpet bowlers regard this as a point of superiority over indoor bowls and short-mat bowls, as carpet bowls is really a game that relies heavily on the art of quality drawing woods and less on power and fortune.

Bedfordshire, Cambridgeshire, Essex, Hertfordshire, Norfolk, and Suffolk compete each year in the Eastern Counties Championship and also play each in an Eastern Counties League. Suffolk have been the most successful side in recent years. The National Championships take place each year at the Potters Leisure Resort in Norfolk.

== Local leagues ==
=== Bedfordshire ===
The clubs that participate in the Bedfordshire County Carpet Bowls League (Premier Division and Division One) are: Barton, Billington, Clophill, Cople, Cotton End, Gravenhurst, Haynes, Lilley, Maulden, Slip End, Toddington, Turvey and Wootton.

=== Essex ===
Essex County Carpet Bowls Association was formed in 1983. The original founding clubs included: Bradwell on Sea, Elmdon, Fyfield, Goldhanger, Great Easton, Great Horkesley, Purleigh, Stisted, Tolleshunt Knights, Weeley & Wrabness. Of these, Fyfield, Purleigh & Stisted are definitely still going strong. Today, there are over 100 clubs competing for the Essex County league and cup championships.

== See also ==
- Bowling
- Short mat bowls
