= La Découverte =

Éditions La Découverte
- Parent company: Editis
- Predecessor: Éditions Maspero (1959-1982)
- Founded: 1983
- Founders: François Maspero, François Gèze
- Country of origin: France
- Headquarters location: Paris
- Key people: Hugues Jallon, Stéphanie Chevrier
- Nonfiction topics: Philosophy, anthropology, psychology, sociology, politics, economics, history
- Fiction genres: social sciences, humanities
- Imprints: Éditions de l'Atelier, Syros, Dominique Carré
- Owner: Daniel Kretinsky
- Official website: https://www.editionsladecouverte.fr

Éditions La Découverte is a publishing company in France that was founded by François Gèze in 1983.

== History and ownership ==
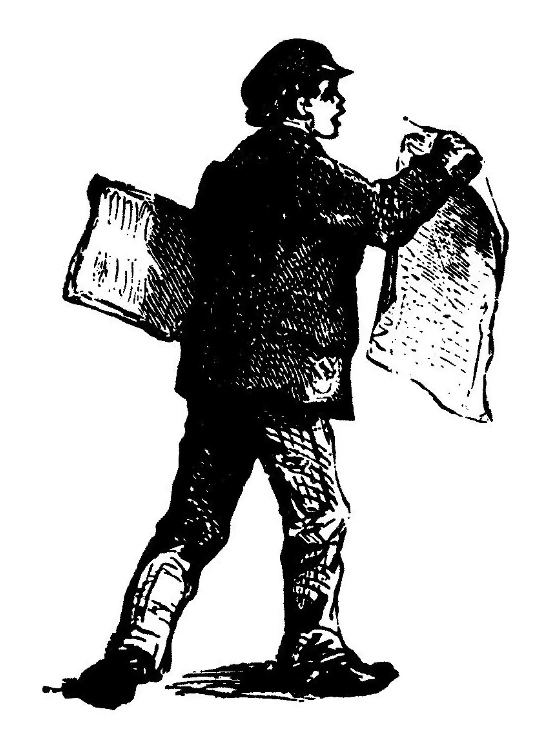

François Maspero had founded Èditions Maspero in 1959. Gèze joined that company in 1977 to curate one of its collections. At the time, the publishing house was the leading French publisher of Marxist and anti-colonial theorists.

In 1983, Maspero sold his part in the company to Gèze for a symbolic 1 franc. Thus, the new company, La Découverte, inherited the entire Maspero List.

In 1998, La Découverte was sold to the group Havas. Two years earlier it has also merged with Éditions de l'Atelier and Syros (French publishing house). In 2004, amid the collapse of Vivendi, La Découverte came under the control of the Hachette Livre. In June 2023, Vivendi, controlled by Vincent Bolloré, took over Lagardère Publishing, but ultimately decided, amid widespread concern in the media about politicized influence (or in general media bias) and corporate control in media, to sell off its asset Editis, which included La Découverte, and retain only Hachette as a Vivendi asset. Bolloré, in particular, is widely understood to favor the right in French politics and many of the publishing companies at stake, like La Decouverte, have a long tradition of left wing culture.

In 2022, La Découverte, which continues to operate as if it was an independent company despite its corporate ownership, was awarded the Publisher Prize from Les Rencontres Philosophiques de Monaco.

Currently, Editis, and therefore La Découverte, are owned by Daniel Kretinsky through his Czech media investment company.

== Management ==
Hugues Jallon became literary director in 1997 and soon also became editorial director of La Découverte. In January 2014, he took over the leadership of the publishing house, while François Gèze remained as a series editor. Four years later, Jallon became the head of Éditions du Seuil and was succeeded by Stéphanie Chevrier, the founder and director of Don Quichotte (part of La Martinière Groupe).

== Catalogue ==
=== Authors published by La Découverte ===
- Serge Audier
- Étienne Balibar
- Pierre Charbonnier
- Philippe Breton
- Pierre Lévy
- Armand Mattelart
- Pierre Vidal-Naquet
- Eric Cline
- Gérard Noiriel
- Enzo Traverso
- Michelle Zancarini-Fournel
- Robert S. Boyer
- Bruno Amable
- Alain Lipietz
- Branko Milanovic
- Pierre Salama
- Bernard Lahire
- Nancy Fraser
- Estelle Ferrarese
- Achille Mbembe
- James C. Scott
- Judith Butler
- Elsa Dorlin
- Éric Fassin
- Bertrand Badie
- Georges Corm
- Yves Lacoste
- Axel Honneth
- Hartmut Rosa

==== Selected titles ====
- Tête de Turc by Günter Wallraff (1986)
- Le Harcèlement moral by Marie-France Hirigoyen (Syros, 1998)
- Là-bas si j'y suis by Daniel Mermet (1999)
- Notre ami Ben Ali by Jean-Pierre Tuquoi and Nicolas Beau (1999)
- Le monde n'est pas une marchandise by José Bové and François Dufour (2000)
- La Sale Guerre by Habib Souaïdia (2001)
- Françalgérie by Lounis Aggoun and Jean-Baptiste Rivoire (2004)
- La Fracture coloniale edited by Pascal Blanchard, Nicolas Bancel, and Sandrine Lemaire (2005)
- L'Histoire secrète de la Ve République edited by Roger Faligot, Jean Guisnel, and Rémi Kauffer (2006)
- Storytelling by Christian Salmon (2007)
- Le Monde selon Monsanto by Marie-Monique Robin (2008)
- L'Histoire secrète du patronat edited by Benoît Collombat and David Servenay (2009)
- Kamerun by Thomas Deltombe, Manuel Domergue, and Jacob Tatsitsa (2011)
- Le féminisme en mouvements: des années 1960 à l'ère néolibérale by Nancy Fraser and Estelle Ferrarese. Paris. ISBN 9782707194534. (2012)
- Le Jeûne, une nouvelle thérapie by Thierry de Lestrade (2013)
- Pour les musulmans by Edwy Plenel (2014)
- Le Piège Daech by Pierre-Jean Luizard (2015)
- Les Arabes, leur destin et le nôtre by Jean-Pierre Filiu (2015)
- Ceci est mon sang by Élise Thiébaut (2017)
- Down to Earth: Politics in the New Climatic Regime by Bruno Latour (2017)
- La Caste by Laurent Mauduit (2018)
- Histoire populaire du football by Michaël Correia (2018)
- La Puissance des mères by Fatima Ouassak (2020)
- La Fabrique des pandémies by Marie-Monique Robin (2021)
- Une poupée en chocolat by Amandine Gay

===== Selected translations =====
- La Fin du travail by Jeremy Rifkin (1996)
- Dégraissez-moi ça by Michael Moore (2000)
- Mike contre-attaque by Michael Moore (2002)
- Tous aux abris! by Michael Moore (2004)
- The Great War for Civilisation by Robert Fisk (2005)
- Shop Class as Soulcraft by Matthew Crawford (2010)

==== Imprints, collections, and periodicals ====
Hérodote is one of the many periodicals published by La Découverte. It was founded in 1976 by Yves Lacoste and is currently directed by Béatrice Giblin. The journal Hérodote is a quarterly publication specializing in geopolitics. "Hérodote" is the French spelling for Herodotus, the Ancient Greek historian.

In 2005, La Découverte spearheaded the launch of Cairn.info—a portal for humanities and social sciences publications—along with three other publishing houses: Éditions Belin, De Boeck, and Éditions Érès.

In 2007, La Découverte launched Zones, an imprint directed by Grégoire Chamayou, which publishes authors such as Mona Chollet, Cédric Durand, Michel and Monique Pinçon-Charlot, among others.

In 2008, La Découverte welcomed the imprint Les Empêcheurs de penser en rond, directed by Philippe Pignarre, which publishes authors such as Vinciane Despret, Bruno Latour, Bertrand Méheust, Isabelle Stengers, Anna L. Tsing, and Nastassja Martin. That same year saw the launch of the "Théorie critique" series, directed by Olivier Voirol.

In 2015, La Découverte acquired Dominique Carré’s publishing house, which specialized in illustrated books with a scientific focus—particularly in urban planning. That same year, La Découverte launched the periodical Revue du crieur in partnership with Mediapart and, in the same year, the "Culture Sonore" series—co-published with the Philharmonie de Paris—was established, as was the "L'envers des faits" series, directed by Stéphane Beaud (until 2019), Paul Pasquali, and Fabien Truong.

== See also ==
- Culture of France
- Books in France
- Karl Marx
- Friedrich Engels
