= Audrey Vernon =

French actress (1980)

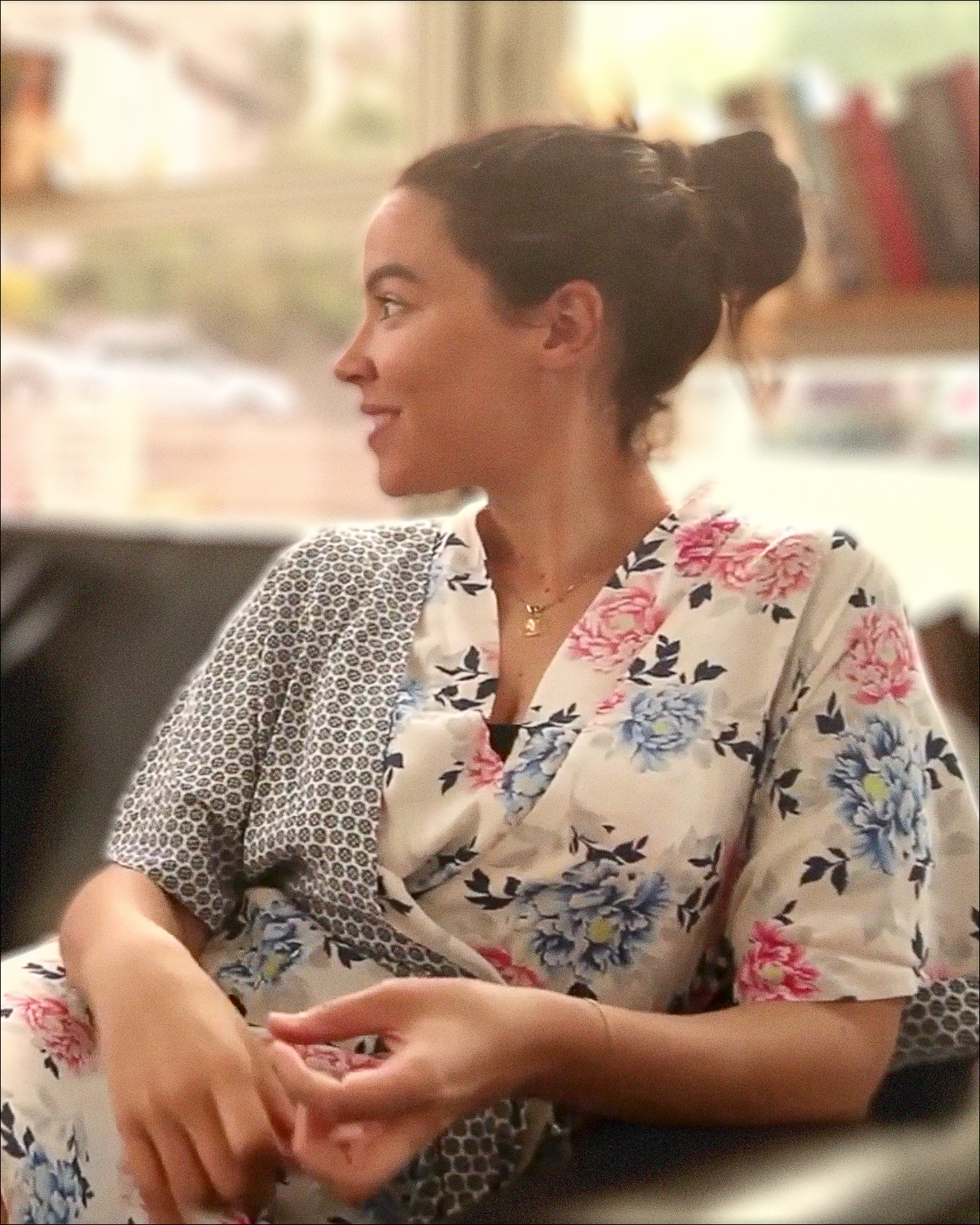
- Audrey Vernon in 2015
- Born: October 31, 1980 (age 45); Marseille
- Education: Conservatoire à rayonnement régional Toulon Provence Méditerranée ; conservatoire du Xe arrondissement de Paris ; cours Florent
- Alma mater: Cours Florent
- Occupation: Actress - comedian - writer
- Years active: 2000–present
- Notable work: How to marry a billionaire
- Style: Humor about the economy
- Television: « La séance au choix » (Canal+) ; « Une minute quoditienne » (Canal+ Décalé)
- Website: https://audreyvernon.com/

Audrey Vernon was born on October 31, 1980 in Marseille and is a French actress.

== Biography ==
Audrey Vernon studied drama at the conservatory in Toulon, the conservatory in Paris's 10th arrondissement, and the Cours Florent. She made her theater debut as Ophelia in Hamlet by William Shakespeare and as Polly in The Threepenny Opera by Bertolt Brecht.

She appeared on television in the 2001 television film Fatou la Malienne, directed by Daniel Vigne; the 2007 TV series Moot-Moot, directed by Éric Judor and Ramzy Bedia; and the 2010 television film Le Petit Poucet, directed by Omar Sy and Fred Testot. She has also appeared on stage in Betrayal by Harold Pinter, directed by Léonie Simaga, among other plays. Following La Séance au Choix, Audrey Vernon was given a daily one-minute slot on Canal+ Décalé from 2005 to 2013.

In 2005, she wrote her first show, Le spectacle le plus drôle du monde (The Funniest Show in the World), a critique of one-man shows. In 2009, she wrote the "first economic 'one-man' show," Comment épouser un milliardaire (How to Marry a Billionaire), which premiered at the Paname and then played at the Sentier des Halles and the Théâtre du Gymnase Marie-Bell before going on tour. This show's script was published in 2015 under the same title. In 2012, she created a new one-man show, Marx et Jenny, about Karl Marx, his wife Jenny, their best friend Friedrich Engels, and Helene Demuth, who also lived with them. In July 2013, she inaugurated La Nouvelle Seine, a new theater in Paris, with a series of forty performances of this show. On February 14, 2014, she premiered Chagrin d'amour (Heartbreak), a one-man show about grief and heartbreak. In May 2015, she created a new show with Xavier Mathieu: Fukushima, Work in Progress, based on a Japanese legend, at the L'Avant Seine theater in Colombes.

Starting in August 2016, she presented Le billet d'Audrey Vernon on Le Cinq Sept on France Inter on Fridays at 6:55 a.m. On August 17, her commentary about suicides among railway workers was censored in the France Inter replay at the request of the SNCF.

Giorgia Sinicorni is reviving the show How to Marry a Billionaire in Italy, which will premiere in Milan at the Franco Parenti Theater. On January 18, 2018, Audrey Vernon celebrated the 500th and final performance of the show at the Théâtre Antoine in Paris.

On January 15, 2018, Audrey Vernon, in partnership with journalist Hervé Kempf and the editorial staff of Reporterre, created the show Écologie, maintenant il faut se battre (Ecology: Now We Must Fight) at the Maison des Métallos. The show featured readings of radical ecological texts. Marianne Denicourt and Audrey Vernon led the reading, accompanied by Yacine Belhousse, Thomas VDB, Yves Noël Genod, Giorgia Sinicorni, and David Azencot. The texts from this show are available upon request on the Reporterre website and the show is open to revivals. It has since been revived in Montreal by Michelle Parent and in Lyon by a collective.

In the winter of 2020, she presented her latest show, Billion Dollar Baby (originally titled Cannon Fodder), at La Nouvelle Seine. The show was directed and designed by Dorian Rossel and Delphine Lanza from the Swiss company SuperTropTop. In the show, a pregnant woman talks to her unborn child, describing the world in which he will have to learn to live.

Performances were suspended in France in March 2020 due to the pandemic. The show will go on tour starting in the fall, with performances resuming in Paris in January 2021.

Due to the coronavirus pandemic, the actress's latest show was put on hold. In April 2020, she launched BigBooks, a podcast dedicated to sharing with her audience the readings that inspire her by reading excerpts from essays and articles on capitalism and neoliberalism. Over the course of several episodes, the BigBooks podcast explores the economy's hold on the planet and humanity. The first episode is devoted to the essay Baise ton prochain: Une histoire souterraine du capitalisme (Fuck Your Neighbor: An Underground History of Capitalism) by Dany-Robert Dufour, published by Actes Sud. Other featured guests include Noam Chomsky, Fatima Ouassak, David Graeber, and Ta-Nehisi Coates.

In March 2022, she joined the Parlement de l'Union Populaire (People's Union Parliament), which supports Jean-Luc Mélenchon's candidacy in the 2022 French presidential election. She was present at his march for the Sixth Republic.

In 2023, she was one of the twenty co-presidents of the association that provides financial support to Soulèvements de la Terre.

== Theater and shows ==
- Hamlet by William Shakespeare (Ophelia)
- The Threepenny Opera by Bertolt Brecht (Polly)
- Betrayal by Harold Pinter, directed by Léonie Simaga
- 2005: The Funniest Show in the World
- 2009: How to Marry a Billionaire
- 2012: Marx and Jenny
- 2014: Heartbreak, an adaptation of Phèdre by Racine for an actress in love and her prompter
- 2015: Fukushima, a work in progress based on a Japanese legend, at the Avant Seine theater in Colombes with Xavier Mathieu
- 2019: Billion Dollar Baby, letter to My Unborn Baby, directed by Dorian Rossel and Delphine Lanza
- 2025 : Comment traverser les sombres temps ? Gurshad Shaheman au Festival d'Avignon
- 2025: How to Marry a Billionaire 2 — Crystal Wedding

== Filmography ==
=== Television ===
- 2001: Fatou la Malienne, TV film by Daniel Vigne
- 2005-2013: daily one-minute, Canal+ Décalé
- 2007: Moot-Moot, TV film by Éric Judor and Ramzy Bedya
- 2010: Le Pas Petit Poucet, TV film by Omar Sy and Fred Testot
- 2021: La Meilleure Version de moi-même by Blanche Gardin

== Radio ==
- Audrey Vernon's post on France Inter
- La Dernière (The Last ) on Radio Nova

== Publications ==
- How to Marry a Billionaire, published by Fayard, April 2015 ISBN 2213686858 Translations:
  - (it) Come sposare un miliardario, published by Rizzoli
  - (nl) Hoe sla je een miljardair aan de haak, published by Atlas contact
- Billion Dollar Baby, Open Letter to My Unborn Child, LIBRE Publishing, November 2020 ISBN 978-2-490403-19-6
