= Marta Segarra =

Spanish philologist and university professor

Marta Segarra Montaner
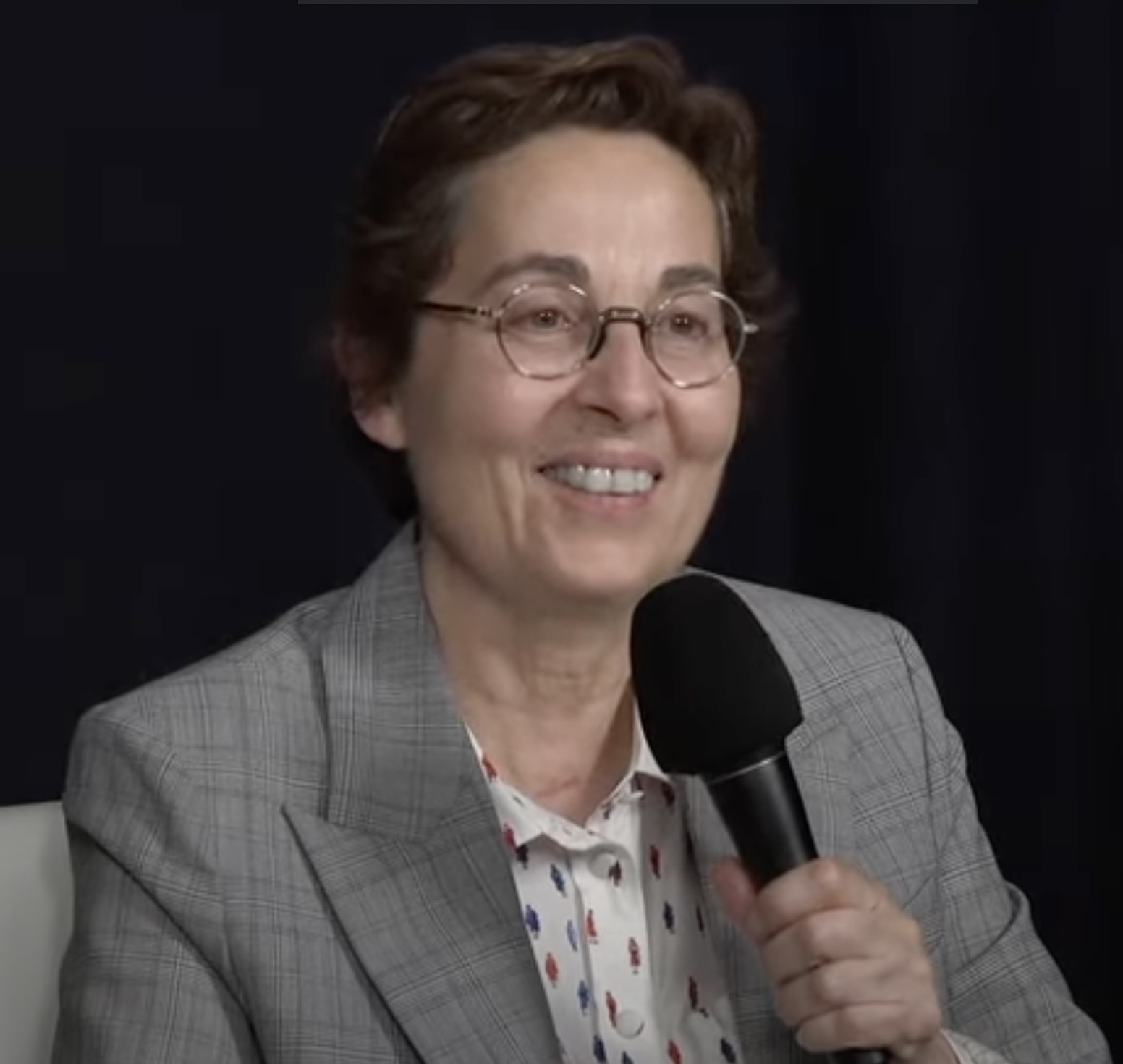
- Born: October 25, 1963 (age 63); Barcelona, Spain
- Citizenship: Spanish
- Occupations: philologist; university professor; CNRS researcher; essayist
- Awards: ICREA Acadèmia award

Academic background
- Education: Ph.D., 1990
- Alma mater: University of Barcelona

Academic work
- Discipline: gender and sexuality studies; biopolitics and posthumanism; cultural studies
- Institutions: University of Barcelona; French National Centre for Scientific Research

Marta Segarra Montaner (born October 25, 1963) is a Spanish philologist, university professor, and CNRS researcher who develops her work mainly in the fields of gender and sexuality studies, biopolitics and posthumanism, and cultural studies (literature, film, and theatre). In 2009, Segarra was awarded the Institució Catalana de Recerca i Estudis Avançats (ICREA) Acadèmia award for research excellence in the Catalan field.

== Early life and education ==
Marta Segarra Montaner was born in Barcelona, October 25, 1963.

She graduated in Romance Philology from the University of Barcelona (UB) in 1986, and she obtained her doctorate from the same university in 1990.

== Career and research ==
Segarra is a professor of French literature and gender studies at UB, where she teaches classes in the master's degree in Gender, Difference and Power. Since 2015, she has been director of research at the Gender and Sexuality Studies Laboratory-LEGS, of the French National Centre for Scientific Research in Paris. She is co-founder of the Center Dona i Literatura, where she remained between 1994 and 2013, and served as the UNESCO Chair for "Women, development and cultures" at UB between 2004 and 2015. Previously, Segarra was visiting professor at the Paris 8 University Vincennes-Saint-Denis, at the Collège international de philosophie in Paris, at Cornell University, and at the University of California, Berkeley, among other institutions. Her research focuses on gender and sexuality studies, literature and women, francophone literature in the Maghreb and, in general, the relationship between culture, politics and sexuality.

Segarra has published numerous books and more than a hundred articles in specialized publications including, Teoría de los cuerpos agujereados (Theory of Bodies with Holes) (Editorial Melusina, 2014), L'habitació, la casa, el carrer (Centre de Cultura Contemporània de Barcelona (CCCB), 2014), and Escriure el desig. De La Celestina a Maria-Mercè Marçal (Write the design. From La Celestina to Maria-Mercè Marçal) (Afers, 2013), among others. She has also edited several collective volumes, such as Représentation et non-représentation des Roms en Espagne et en France (with Éric Fassin, 2018), Differences in common: Gender, Vulnerability and Community (with Joana Sabadell-Nieto, Brill, 2014) and Thinking (of) Animals after Derrida (with Anne E. Berger, Rodopi, 2010).

She is director of the “Mujeres y Culturas” section of Icaria Editorial, of the international magazine, Expressions Maghrébines, and is part of the editorial teams of various publications such as Critical Studies (Rodopi).

== Awards and honours ==
- 2009, ICREA Acadèmia award for research excellence in the Catalan

== Selected works ==
- Teoría de los cuerpos agujereados (Melusina, 2014)
- L’habitació, la casa, el carrer (CCCB, 2014)
- Escriure el desig. De La Celestina a Maria-Mercè Marçal (Afers, 2013)
- Représentation et non-représentation des Roms en Espagne et en France (with Éric Fassin, 2018)
- Differences in common: Gender, Vulnerability and Community (with Joana Sabadell-Nieto, Brill, 2014)
- Thinking (of) Animals after Derrida (with Anne E. Berger, Rodopi, 2010)
