= Streich =

Streich is a surname. Notable people with the surname include:

- Christian Streich, German football player and manager
- Daniel Streich, Swiss military instructor
- Jacek Streich, Polish rower
- Joachim Streich, East German footballer
- Johannes Streich (1891–1977), German military officer
- Philip Vidal Streich, American scientist
- Rita Streich (1920–1987), operatic soprano
