= Carine Fouteau =

French journalist (born 1974)

- Born: 1974 (age 51–52)
- Occupation: Journalist
- Employer(s): Les Echos (1999–2008); Mediapart (2008–present)
- Website: blogs.mediapart.fr/carine-fouteau

Carine Fouteau (born 1974) is a French journalist. She is chief executive and publication director of Mediapart since March 2024.

== Education ==
Carine Fouteau studied history at Université Paris I where she graduated with a bachelor's degree.

She has studied at Sciences Po Paris.

In 1999, she obtained a master's degree in journalism at the New York University.

== Career ==
Carine Fouteau began her journalist career in 1999 in French newspaper Les Echos, first for the website, but shortly after in the printed newspaper team. At first writing on labor and working conditions, she created in 2003 a new section of the newspaper focused on social matters: laicity, immigration, demography…

In 2008 after LVMH's acquisition of Les Echos, Carine Fouteau joined the brand new online newspaper Mediapart, specializing in migration. She became one of the two chief editors ten years later, in 2018, associated with Stéphane Alliès. They succeeded to François Bonnet, co-founder of Mediapart.

In 2024, she succeeded to other Mediapart co-founder Edwy Plenel as president and head of publication. At this occasion, the board of directors consisted of 4 women. Mediapart, which is the third generalist daily French newspaper, became the first to be managed exclusively by women.

== Bibliography ==
- Danièle Lochak; Carine Fouteau : Immigrés sous contrôle. Le Cavalier Bleu, 2008. ISBN 978-2-84670-211-9
- Éric Fassin; Carine Fouteau; Serge Guichard; Aurélie Windels : Roms & riverains, Une politique municipale de la race. Fabrique 2014 ISBN 978-2-35872-057-1
- Fatma Hassona (avec Sepideh Farsi, Carine Fouteau) : Les yeux de Gaza, 2025. Paris: Éditions Textuel. 18 × 25,5 cm. ISBN 978-2-38629-128-9
