= 2009 Swiss minaret referendum =

Successful popular initiative in Switzerland

Federal popular initiative "against the construction of minarets"
Results
Choice	Votes	%
Yes	1,535,610	57.51%
No	1,134,440	42.49%
Valid votes	2,670,050	98.55%
Invalid or blank votes	39,237	1.45%
Total votes	2,709,287	100.00%
Eligible to vote/turnout	5,039,676	53.76%
- The results of the November 2009 referendum by canton. Red indicates opposition to the ban of minarets, green support of the ban.

The federal popular initiative "against the construction of minarets" was a successful popular initiative in Switzerland to prevent the construction of minarets on mosques. In a November 2009 referendum, a constitutional amendment banning the construction of new minarets was approved by 57.5% of the participating voters. Only three of the twenty-six Swiss cantons and one half canton, mostly in the French-speaking part of Switzerland, opposed the initiative.

This referendum originates from action on 1 May 2007, when a group of right-wing populist politicians, mainly from the Swiss People's Party and the Federal Democratic Union of Switzerland, the Egerkinger Komittee ("Egerkingen Committee") launched a federal popular initiative that sought a constitutional ban on minarets. The minaret at the mosque of the local Turkish cultural association in Wangen bei Olten was the initial motivation for the initiative.

The Swiss government recommended that the proposed amendment be rejected as inconsistent with the basic principles of the constitution. However, after the results were tabulated, the government immediately announced that the ban was in effect.

As of the date of the 2009 vote, there were four minarets in Switzerland, attached to mosques in Zürich, Geneva, Winterthur and Wangen bei Olten. These existing minarets were not affected by the ban, as they had already been constructed.

== Background ==
=== Legal dispute ===
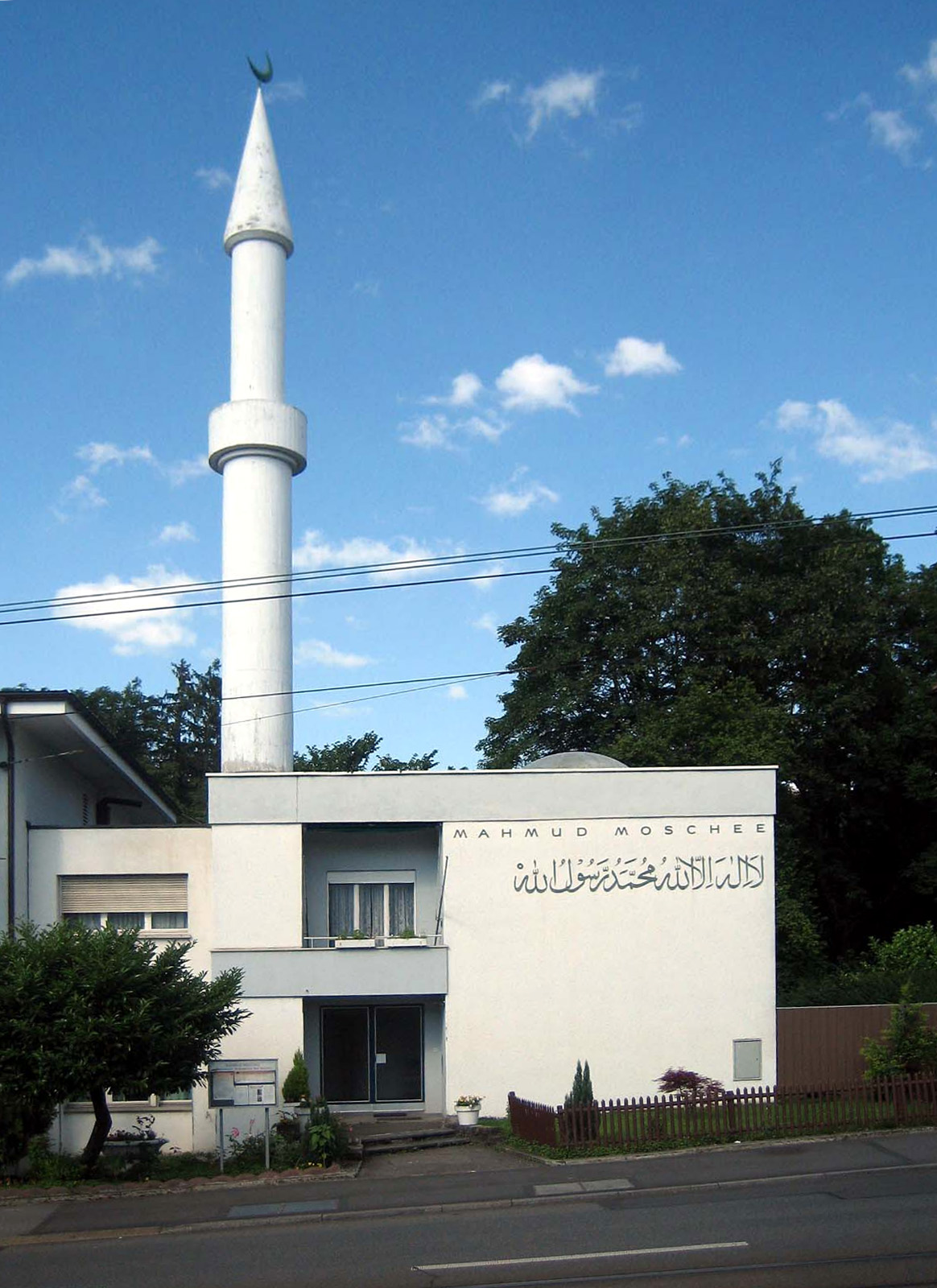
The Ahmadiyya mosque in Zürich (built 1963), the oldest Swiss mosque with a minaret

The Swiss minaret controversy began in a small municipality in the northern part of Switzerland in 2005. The contention involved the Turkish cultural association in Wangen bei Olten, which applied for a construction permit to erect a 6-metre-high minaret on the roof of its Islamic community centre. The project faced opposition from surrounding residents, who had formed a group to prevent the tower's erection. The Turkish association claimed that the building authorities improperly and arbitrarily delayed its building application. They also believed that the members of the local opposition group were motivated by religious bias. The Communal Building and Planning Commission rejected the association's application. The applicants appealed to the Building and Justice Department, which reverted the decision and remanded. As a consequence of that decision, local residents (who were members of the group mentioned) and the commune of Wangen brought the case before the Administrative Court of the Canton of Solothurn, but failed with their claims. On appeal the Federal Supreme Court affirmed the decision of the lower court. The 6-metre (20 ft)-high minaret was erected in July 2009.

=== Initial attempts at popular initiatives ===
From 2006 until 2008, members of the Swiss People's Party and the Federal Democratic Union launched several cantonal initiatives against the construction of minarets. The initiatives were held to be unconstitutional by cantonal parliaments and therefore void, and did not proceed to balloting.

== Referendum ==
In 2007, in response to the political defeats described above, the Egerkinger committee launched a federal popular initiative against minarets. The committee's proposed amendment to article 72 of the Swiss Federal Constitution read: "The building of minarets is prohibited."

In Switzerland, federal popular initiatives are not subject to judicial review, as they amend the federal constitution (whereas cantonal initiatives can be challenged in court for violating federal law). Federal initiatives are still bound by international law (jus cogens), however. Promoters of popular initiatives have 18 months to collect at least 100,000 signatures. If they succeed, the initiative is put before the Swiss citizenry in a national vote. Both federal and cantonal initiatives are common in Switzerland, resulting in many referendum votes each year.

=== Support ===
==== Egerkinger committee ====
The Egerkinger committee was made up of members of the Swiss People's Party and the Federal Democratic Union. The committee opined that the interests of residents, who are disturbed by specific kinds of religious land uses, are to be taken seriously. Moreover, it argued that Swiss residents should be able to block unwanted and unusual projects such as the erection of Islamic minarets. The committee alleged, among other things, that "the construction of a minaret has no religious meaning. Neither in the Qur'an, nor in any other holy scripture of Islam is the minaret expressly mentioned at any point. The minaret is far more a symbol of a claim of religious-political power [...]." The initiators justified their point of view by quoting parts of a speech in 1997 by Recep Tayyip Erdoğan (later Prime Minister and President of Turkey), which stated: "Mosques are our barracks, domes our helmets, minarets our bayonets, believers our soldiers. This holy army guards my religion." Ulrich Schluer, one of the Egerkinger committee's most prominent spokesmen, stated on that point: "A minaret has nothing to do with religion: It just symbolises a place where Islamic law is established." The members of the Egerkinger committee included, among others, Ulrich Schluer, Christian Waber, Walter Wobmann, Jasmin Hutter, Oskar Freysinger, Eric Bonjour, Sylvia Flückiger, Lukas Reimann, and Natalie Rickli. The mobilisation has been linked to the counter-jihad movement, and Freysinger who was a leader in the campaign was later lauded as a hero when he attended the 2010 counter-jihad conference in Paris.

==== Poster campaign ====
First poster (in German); showing minarets on a Swiss flag and a woman wearing an abaya and niqab. The text reads, "Stop", "Yes to the minaret ban".

Second poster (in French); after some municipalities refused to allow posting of the original version on public ground, the second poster reads "Censorship, one more reason to say yes to the minaret ban".

The committee's campaign featured posters featuring a drawing of a Muslim woman in an abaya and niqab, next to a number of minarets on a Swiss flag pictured in a way "reminiscent of missiles". The Swiss People's Party also published a similar poster, with the minarets protruding through a Swiss flag. A few days before the election, campaigners drove a vehicle near Geneva Mosque in the Le Petit-Saconnex imitating the adhan, the Islamic call to ritual prayer (salat) using loudspeakers. Its neighbourhood voted by 1,942 votes to 1,240 to reject the ban.

==== Feminists ====
The British newspaper The Times cited support of the minaret ban from "radical feminists" who opposed the oppression of women in Islamic societies. Among those named were the notable Dutch feminist and former politician Ayaan Hirsi Ali, who in December gave her support to the ban with an article entitled "Swiss ban on minarets was a vote for tolerance and inclusion". The Times further reported that in pre-election polling, Swiss women supported the ban by a greater percentage than Swiss men.

==== Society of St Pius X ====
The traditionalist Society of St Pius X, which has its headquarters at Ecône in Switzerland, supported the ban on minarets, denouncing opposition to the ban by some Catholic bishops:

the confusion maintained by certain Vatican II Council authorities between tolerating a person, whatever his religion and tolerating an ideology that is incompatible with Christian tradition.

and explaining its support of the ban:

The Islamic doctrine cannot be accepted when you know what it is all about. How can one expect to condone the propagation of an ideology that encourages husbands to beat their wives, the "believer" to murder the "infidel", a justice that uses body mutilation as punishment, and pushes to reject Jews and Christians?

=== Opposition ===
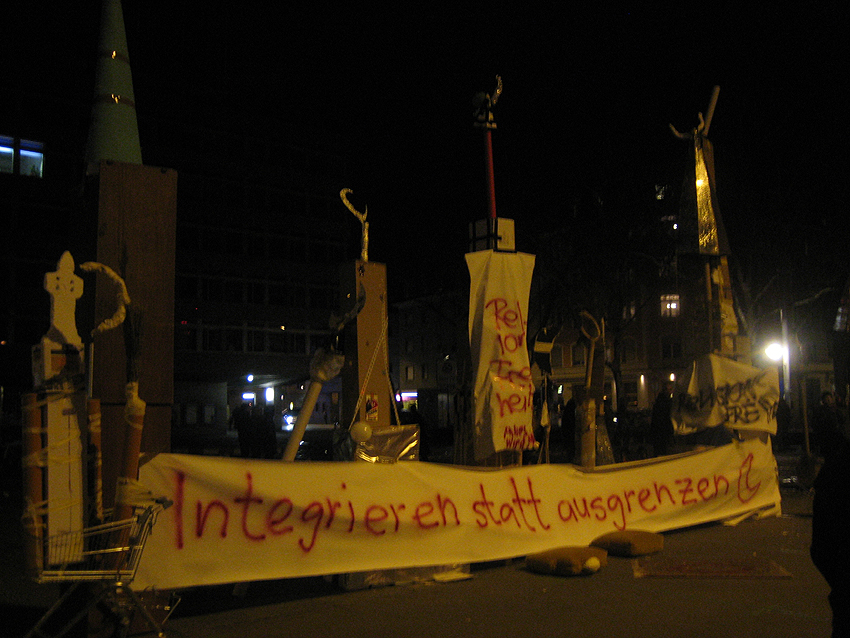
On the evening of the vote, demonstrations against the result were held in Switzerland's major cities. The banner beneath the makeshift minarets reads: "Integrate rather than exclude."

==== The Swiss Government ====
On 28 August 2008 the Swiss Federal Council opposed a building ban on minarets. It said that the popular initiative against their construction had been submitted in accordance with the applicable regulations, but infringed guaranteed international human rights and contradicted the core values of the Swiss Federal Constitution. It believed a ban would endanger peace between religions and would not help to prevent the spread of fundamentalist Islamic beliefs. In its opinion, the Federal Council therefore recommended the Swiss people to reject the initiative. On 24 October 2008 the Federal Commission against Racism criticised the people's initiative, claiming that it defamed Muslims and violated religious freedom, which was protected by fundamental human rights and the ban on discrimination.

==== Parliament ====
The Federal Assembly recommended (by 132 to 51 votes and 11 abstentions) in spring of 2009 that the Swiss people reject the minaret ban initiative.

==== Non-governmental organisations ====
The Society for Minorities in Switzerland called for freedom and equality and started an internet-based campaign in order to gather as many symbolic signatures as possible against a possible minaret ban. Amnesty International warned the minaret ban aimed to exploit fears of Muslims and encourage xenophobia for political gains. "This initiative claims to be a defense against rampant Islamification of Switzerland," Daniel Bolomey, the head of Amnesty's Swiss office, said in a statement cited by Agence France-Presse. "But it seeks to discredit Muslims and defames them, pure and simple." Economiesuisse considered that an absolute construction ban would hit Swiss foreign interests negatively, claiming that merely the launch of the initiative had caused turmoil in the Islamic world. The Swiss-based "Unser Recht" ("Our Law") association published a number of articles against the minaret ban. In autumn 2009, the Swiss Journal of Religious Freedom launched a public campaign for religious harmony, security, and justice in Switzerland, and distributed several thousand stickers in the streets of Zürich in support of the right to religious freedom.

==== Religious organisations ====
The Catholic Church in Switzerland opposed a minaret ban. A statement from the Swiss Bishops' Conference said that a ban would hinder interreligious dialogue and that the construction and operation of minarets were already regulated by Swiss building codes. The statement added that "Our request for the initiative to be rejected is based on our Christian values and the democratic principles in our country." The official journal of the Catholic Church in Switzerland published a series of articles on the minaret controversy. The Federation of Swiss Protestant Churches held that the federal popular initiative was not about minarets, but was rather an expression of the initiators' concern and fear of Islam. It viewed a minaret ban as a wrong approach to express such objections. The Swiss Federation of Jewish Communities was also against any ban on building minarets. Dr Herbert Winter, the president of the Federation, said in 2009: "As Jews we have our own experience. For centuries we were excluded: we were not allowed to construct synagogues or cupola roofs. We do not want that kind of exclusion repeated." Other religious organisations described the idea of a complete minaret ban as lamentable; the Association of Evangelical Free Churches; the Swiss Evangelical Alliance; the Christian Catholic Church of Switzerland; the Covenant of Swiss Baptists; the Salvation Army; the Federation of Evangelical Lutheran Churches in Switzerland; the Orthodox Diocese of the Ecumenical Patriarchate of Constantinople; the Serbian Orthodox Church in Switzerland; and the Anglican Church in Switzerland.

==== Individual legal experts ====
Marcel Stüssi argued that any ban would be incompatible with articles of international law, to which Switzerland was a signatory. In any case, cantonal zoning laws already prohibited the construction of buildings that did not match their surroundings. "Right-wing initiatives like the minaret one can misuse the system," said Stüssi. He called the initiative "obsolete and unnecessary", but added that the public discourse on the issue could put Switzerland in a positive light, at least for the majority who at that point opposed a ban. In July 2008, before the popular initiative, he argued that "crisis always creates an opportunity. A popular vote against a proposed ban would be the highest declaration for the recognition of the Swiss Muslim community." "It would also be an expressed statement that anybody is equally subject to the law and to the political process," Stüssi said in an interview with World Radio Switzerland. Heinrich Koller stated that "Switzerland must abide by international law because both systems together form a unity." Giusep Nay states that from an objective viewpoint jus cogens is to be read and given effect in association with fundamental norms of international law. According to Nay, this interpretation meant that any state action must be in accordance with fundamental material justice, and applied not only to interpretations of applicable law but also to new law. Erwin Tanner saw the initiative as breaching not only the constitutionally entrenched right to religious freedom, but also the rights to freedom of expression, enjoyment of property, and equality. The editorial board of the Revue de Droit Suisse called for invalidation of the initiative as "it appears that the material content of popular initiatives is subject to ill-considered draftsmanship because the drafters are affected by particular emotions that merely last for snatches."

Sami Aldeeb positioned himself for ban on the erection of minarets in Switzerland, since in his opinion the constitution allows prayer, but not shouting.

=== Result ===
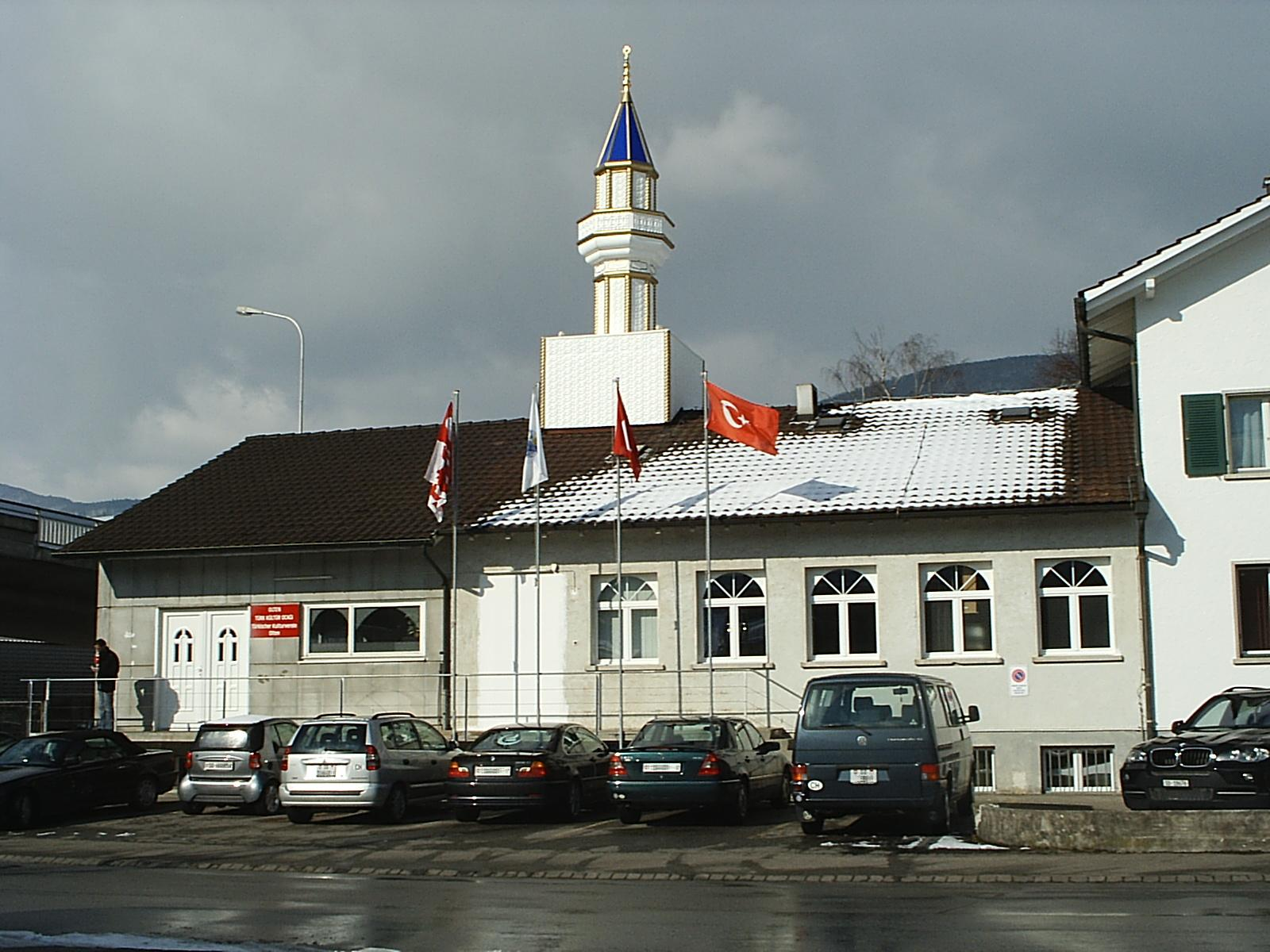
Minaret at the mosque of the local Turkish cultural association in Wangen bei Olten, the initial motivation for the popular initiative.

In a referendum on 29 November 2009, the amendment, which needed a double majority to pass, was approved by 57.5% (1 534 054 citizens) of the voters and by 19½ cantons out of 23. Geneva, Vaud and Neuchâtel, all of which are French-speaking cantons, voted against the ban (59.7%, 53.1% and 50.9% respectively). The canton of Basel-City, which has half a cantonal vote and the largest Muslim community of Switzerland, also rejected the ban by 51.6%. The voter turnout was 53.4%.

At the district level, not including Basel-City and Geneva (which are not divided into districts), the initiative gained a majority of the vote in 132 of the 148 districts. The sixteen districts with a majority negative vote were:

- canton of Vaud: Lausanne, Ouest Lausannois, Lavaux-Oron, Nyon, Morges, Riviera-Pays-d'Enhaut;
- canton of Neuchâtel: Neuchâtel, Boudry, La Chaux-de-Fonds;
- canton of Fribourg: Sarine;
- canton of Jura: Delémont, Franches-Montagnes;
- canton of Zürich: Zürich, Meilen;
- canton of Bern: Bern;
- canton of Solothurn: Solothurn.

The cities of Zürich and Bern, along with Geneva and Basel, also showed a slight majority opposed to the ban. The canton of Zürich as a whole, however, voted 52% in support of it. The highest percentage of votes in favour of the ban were counted in Appenzell Innerrhoden (71%) followed by Glarus (69%), Ticino (68%) and Thurgau (68%).

An independent study carried out by the political scientists Markus Freitag (University of Konstanz), Thomas Milic and Adrian Vatter (University of Bern) noted a good level of knowledge among voters. Contrary to what had been previously thought, the surveys before the referendum did not influence voters, as it is hard to do so with people who are accustomed to them. Those who voted did so according to their political convictions, and by taking into account the different arguments. The study also attributed the result to the fact that supporters of the ban overwhelmingly turned out to vote in the referendum.

== Aftermath of the referendum and implementation of the ban ==
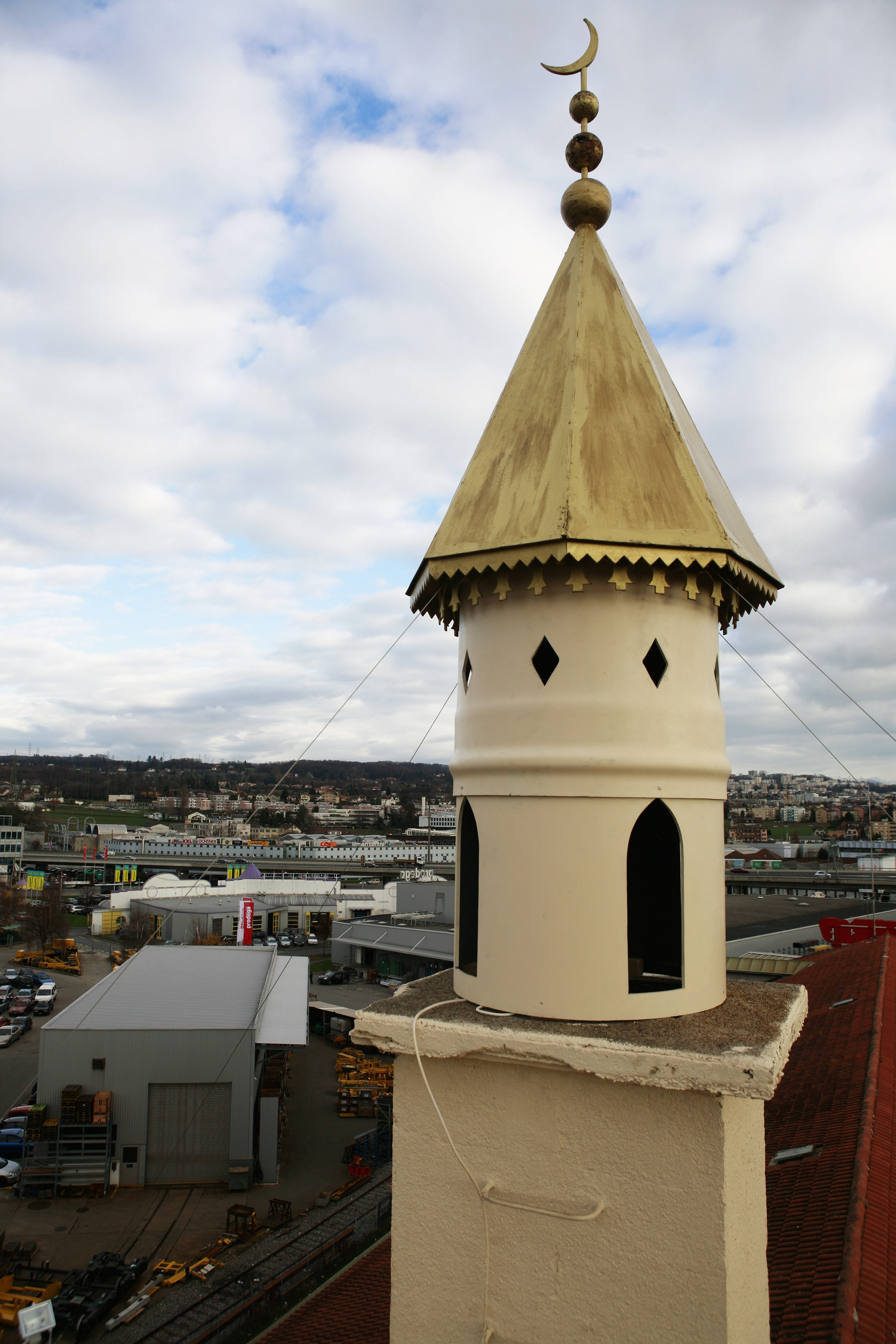
On 8 December 2009, a mock minaret was erected over an industrial storage facility in Bussigny, in protest against the referendum outcome.

There was a claim that the ban on new minarets might be put to the test in the case of a pending project to build a minaret for a mosque in Langenthal, canton of Bern. The Muslim community of Langenthal announced its intention to take its case to the Federal Supreme Court of Switzerland, and, if necessary, to the European Court of Human Rights in Strasbourg. The community's attorney also expressed doubts as to whether the ban could be considered to affect the Langenthal project, because an application for planning permission had been made to the local planning authority in 2006, prior to the referendum result; thus, it was arguable that the ban should not be taken to apply to this project ex post facto. However, a professor of law at St. Gallen University expressed the opinion that the ban rendered the Langenthal project obsolete.

Whether the Langenthal mosque would be affected would depend on the details of the eventual implementation. According to Alexander Ruch, professor of building law at ETH Zurich, there was, at that point, no official definition of the term "minaret", leaving open the handling of hypothetical cases, such as the chimney of a factory building that is converted into a mosque. In the case of the Langenthal minaret, it was even argued that the planned structure was a minaret-like tower and not a minaret. Calls to prayer had been a frequent argument against permitting new minarets, and the planned tower in Langenthal could not be used for that purpose. In the case of the Islamic center in Frauenfeld, canton of Thurgau, an existing ventilation shaft had been adorned with a sheet metal cone topped with a crescent moon. In October 2009, the Frauenfeld city council declined to treat the structure as a "minaret", saying that it had been officially declared a ventilation shaft, and that the additional crescent moon had not provided cause for comment during the six years since its installation.

The Green Party of Switzerland declared that in their opinion, the ban introduced a contradiction into the Swiss constitution, which also contains a paragraph guaranteeing freedom of religion, and in November 2009, the party announced its intention to appeal to the European Court on Human Rights on the matter.

Several applications to the European Court of Human Rights were rejected in 2011 on the grounds that the applicants were not affected parties, as they did not intend to build minarets.

== International reactions ==
The ban sparked reactions from governments and political parties throughout of the world.

=== Official reactions of governments and international bodies ===
- United Nations – In March 2010, the Geneva-based UN Human Rights Council narrowly passed a resolution condemning "defamation of religion", which included reference to "Islamophobic" bans on building new minarets on mosques. The resolution was proposed by the Organisation of the Islamic Conference (OIC). OIC representative Babacar Ba said that the resolution was a "way to reaffirm once again our condemnation of the decision to ban construction of minarets in Switzerland." The resolution was opposed, mostly by Western nations, but it gained a majority due to the votes of Muslim nations, in addition to the support of other countries such as Cuba and China. Eight states abstained. US ambassador Eileen Donahoe criticised the resolution as an "instrument of division" and an "ineffective way to address" concerns about discrimination. The ban was also mentioned by the council's special rapporteur on contemporary forms of racism, racial discrimination, xenophobia and related intolerance in his 2010 report to the United Nations General Assembly.
- France – Foreign Minister Bernard Kouchner condemned the ban, calling it "an expression of intolerance", and said it amounted to "religious oppression", hoping Switzerland would reverse its decision.
- Sweden – Sweden condemned the ban, with foreign minister Carl Bildt stating that "It's an expression of quite a bit of prejudice and maybe even fear, but it is clear that it is a negative signal in every way, there's no doubt about it". He also stated that "Normally Sweden and other countries have city planners that decide this kind of issue. To decide this kind of issue in a referendum seems very strange to me".
- Turkey – Turkish President Abdullah Gül called the ban "shameful".
- Iran – Iranian Foreign Minister Manouchehr Mottaki phoned his Swiss counterpart, and stated that the ban went "against the prestige of a country which claims to be an advocate of democracy and human rights", and that it would "damage Switzerland's image as a pioneer of respecting human rights among the Muslims' public opinion". He also claimed that "values such as tolerance, dialogue, and respecting others' religions should never be put to referendum", and warned Switzerland of the "consequences of anti-Islamic acts", and expressed hopes that the Swiss government would "take necessary steps and find a constitutional way to prevent the imposition of this ban". Switzerland's ambassador to Iran was summoned before the Foreign Ministry, which protested against the ban.
- Libya – Then-Libyan leader Muammar al-Gaddafi cited the minaret ban as grounds for his call for a Jihad against Switzerland in a speech held in Benghazi on the occasion of Mawlid, four months after the vote. Gaddafi also called on Muslims around the world to boycott Switzerland, and stated that "any Muslim in any part of the world that works with Switzerland is an apostate, is against Muhammad, Allah, and the Koran".

=== Non-governmental political responses ===
The Swiss referendum was welcomed by several European far right parties:

- Austria – The Alliance for the Future of Austria stated that "as long as fanatic Islamists describe their mosques as army barracks ... we will prevent building such installations to protect our democracy, human rights and freedom". The Freedom Party of Austria (FPÖ) also proposed for a similar ban on minarets in Austria. A ban is already in effect in the Austrian provinces of Carinthia and Vorarlberg.
- Belgium – Filip Dewinter of the Flemish Interest (Vlaams Belang) stated that it "is a signal that they have to adapt to our way of life and not the other way around".
- Denmark – The Danish People's Party expressed support for a similar referendum on a ban on building of minarets as well as on large mosques in Denmark.
- France – President Nicolas Sarkozy said the referendum results should be respected as it had nothing to do with religious freedom. Marine Le Pen of the French Front National said that "elites should stop denying the aspirations and fears of the European people, who, without opposing religious freedom, reject ostentatious signs that political-religious Muslim groups want to impose".
- Netherlands – Geert Wilders, head of the Dutch Party for Freedom stated he is now aiming at making a similar referendum possible in the Netherlands.
- Italy – Mario Borghezio of the Lega Nord declared that "the flag of a courageous Switzerland which wants to remain Christian is flying over a near-Islamised Europe". Roberto Calderoli of the same party further stated that "Switzerland is sending us a clear signal: yes to bell towers, no to minarets".
- Germany – A senior member of Chancellor Angela Merkel's conservative Christian Democratic Union, Wolfgang Bosbach, stated that criticism of the ban would be "counterproductive", and that the ban reflected a fear of growing Islamization, a fear which "must be taken seriously".

On 30 January 2010, Pakistani newspaper The Nation carried a fabricated story, according to which "the first man who had launched a drive for imposition of ban on mosques minarets", had seen the error of his "evil ways" and had converted to Islam, which had supposedly "created furore in Swiss politics", claiming that Streich "is ashamed of his doings now and desires to construct the most beautiful mosque of Europe in Switzerland." On 5 February, Tikkun debunked The Nation's story as a distorted version of a report about Daniel Streich, a Swiss Muslim who had left the Swiss People's Party because he was outraged with their campaign.

== See also ==
- Special Provisions
