= Les Dévalideuses =

French Feminist group

Les Dévalideuses is a French feminist collective. It is focused on fighting for disabled women within the feminist movement. It is led by Céline Extenso. The collective was founded in October 2019 to fight the marginalisation of disabled women.

== History ==
The idea to form the group started after the Nous Toutes public demonstrations in late 2018, in which the Dévalideuses founders noted the lack of visibility of disabled women within the movement.

In January 2020, the collective ran a social media campaign under the hashtag #JarrêteLeValidisme to raise awareness of ableism.

In February 2020, the collective signed an open letter with over 50 other prominent feminist activists and organisations condemning "the import of transphobia into French feminism."

In April 2021, they published a manifesto in Mediapart, describing themselves as anti-ableist, feminist, and intersectional, aiming to work for public awareness and radical activism.
