= Wangen bei Olten =

- Municipality
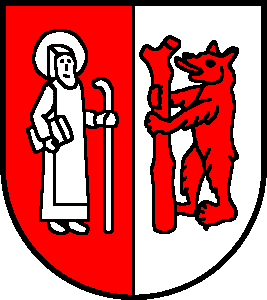
- Coat of arms
- Location of Wangen bei Olten
- Location within Switzerland Location within Canton of Solothurn
- Coordinates: 47°21′N 7°52′E
- Country: Switzerland
- Canton: Solothurn
- District: Olten

Area
  - Total: 6.96 km^{2} (2.69 sq mi)
- Elevation: 417 m (1,368 ft)

Population (December 2020)
  - Total: 5,239
  - Density: 753/km^{2} (1,950/sq mi)
- Time zone: UTC+01:00 (CET)
  - Summer (DST): UTC+02:00 (CEST)
- Postal code: 4612
- SFOS number: 2586
- ISO 3166 code: CH-SO
- Surrounded by: Hauenstein-Ifenthal, Kappel, Olten, Rickenbach, Trimbach
- Twin towns: Traben-Trarbach (Germany)
- Website: wangenbo.ch

Wangen bei Olten (German pronunciation: [ˈvaŋən baɪ ˈɔltn̩], lit. 'Wangen near Olten') is a municipality in the district of Olten in the canton of Solothurn in Switzerland.

== Geography ==
Aerial view (1948)

Wangen bei Olten has an area, as of 2009, of 6.96 square kilometers (2.69 sq mi). Of this area, 1.71 km^{2} (0.66 sq mi) or 24.6% is used for agricultural purposes, while 3.69 km^{2} (1.42 sq mi) or 53.0% is forested. Of the rest of the land, 1.52 km^{2} (0.59 sq mi) or 21.8% is settled (buildings or roads), 0.02 km^{2} (4.9 acres) or 0.3% is either rivers or lakes.

Of the built up area, industrial buildings made up 2.6% of the total area while housing and buildings made up 12.1% and transportation infrastructure made up 4.9%. Power and water infrastructure as well as other special developed areas made up 1.4% of the area. Out of the forested land, 51.7% of the total land area is heavily forested and 1.3% is covered with orchards or small clusters of trees. Of the agricultural land, 15.7% is used for growing crops and 7.3% is pastures, while 1.6% is used for orchards or vine crops. All the water in the municipality is flowing water.

== Coat of arms ==
The blazon of the municipal coat of arms is Per pale gules and argent, in dexter St. Gallus of the second haloed, holding a book in his dexter hand and a walking staff in his sinister hand, in sinister a wolf rampant holding a treetrunk raguly all of the first.

== Demographics ==
Wangen bei Olten has a population (as of December 2020) of 5,239. As of 2008, 20.0% of the population are resident foreign nationals. Between the years 1999–2009 the population had changed at a rate of 7.1%.

Most of the population (as of 2000) speaks German (4,078 or 89.1%), with Italian being second most common (104 or 2.3%) and Serbo-Croatian being third (95 or 2.1%). There are 33 people who speak French and 3 people who speak Romansh.

As of 2008, the gender distribution of the population was 49.1% male and 50.9% female. The population was made up of 1,842 Swiss men (37.9% of the population) and 546 (11.2%) non-Swiss men. There were 2,014 Swiss women (41.4%) and 464 (9.5%) non-Swiss women. Of the population in the municipality 1,056 or about 23.1% were born in Wangen bei Olten and lived there in 2000. There were 1,361 or 29.7% who were born in the same canton, while 1,240 or 27.1% were born somewhere else in Switzerland, and 762 or 16.6% were born outside of Switzerland.

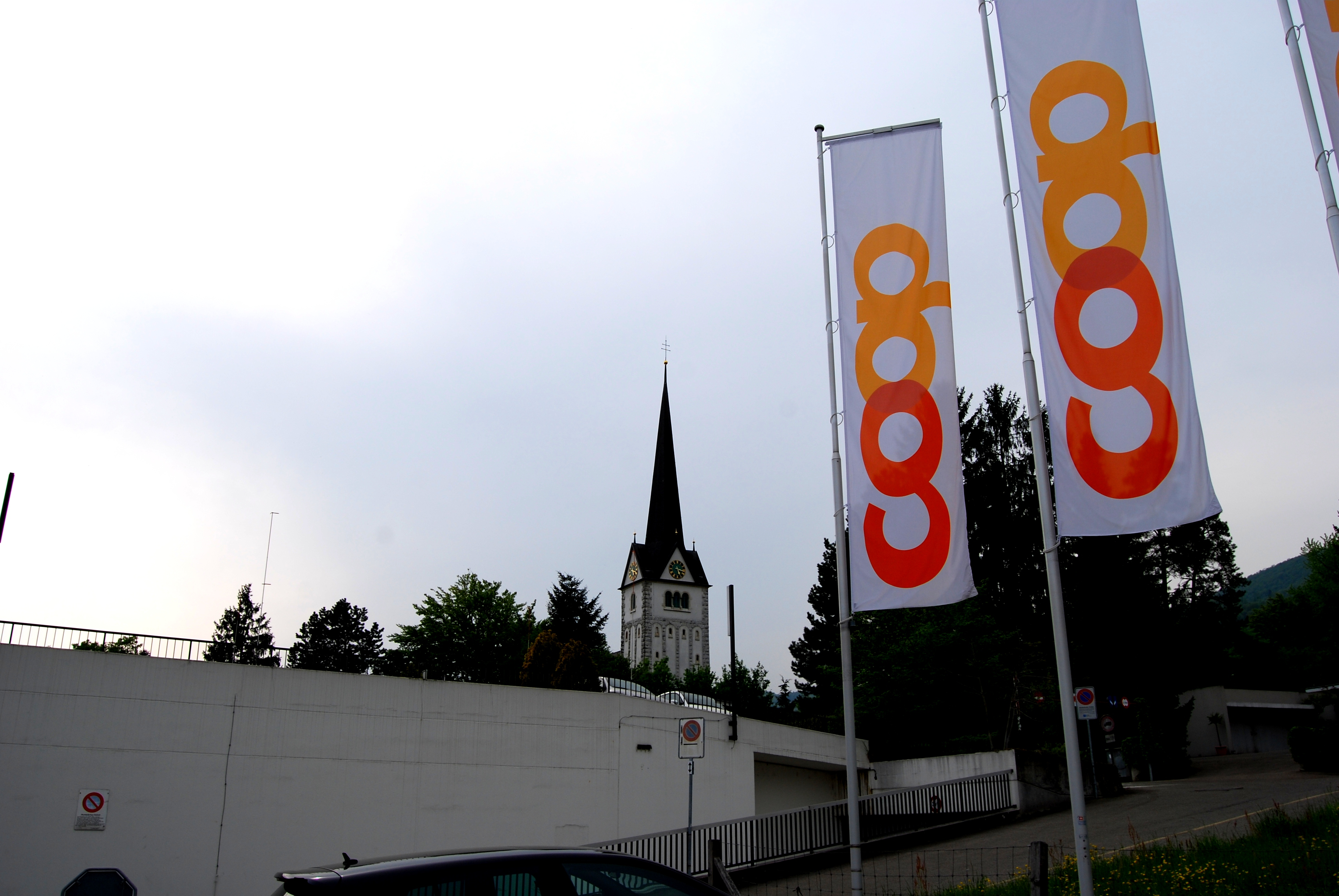
Wangen bei Olten

In 2008 there were 22 live births to Swiss citizens and 13 births to non-Swiss citizens, and in same time span there were 41 deaths of Swiss citizens and 1 non-Swiss citizen death. Ignoring immigration and emigration, the population of Swiss citizens decreased by 19 while the foreign population increased by 12. There were 13 Swiss men and 8 Swiss women who immigrated back to Switzerland. At the same time, there were 31 non-Swiss men and 23 non-Swiss women who immigrated from another country to Switzerland. The total Swiss population change in 2008 (from all sources, including moves across municipal borders) was a decrease of 36 and the non-Swiss population increased by 61 people. This represents a population growth rate of 0.5%.

The age distribution, as of 2000, in Wangen bei Olten is; 301 children or 6.6% of the population are between 0 and 6 years old and 695 teenagers or 15.2% are between 7 and 19. Of the adult population, 252 people or 5.5% of the population are between 20 and 24 years old. 1,410 people or 30.8% are between 25 and 44, and 1,083 people or 23.7% are between 45 and 64. The senior population distribution is 599 people or 13.1% of the population are between 65 and 79 years old and there are 239 people or 5.2% who are over 80.

As of 2000, there were 1,726 people who were single and never married in the municipality. There were 2,280 married individuals, 316 widows or widowers and 257 individuals who are divorced.

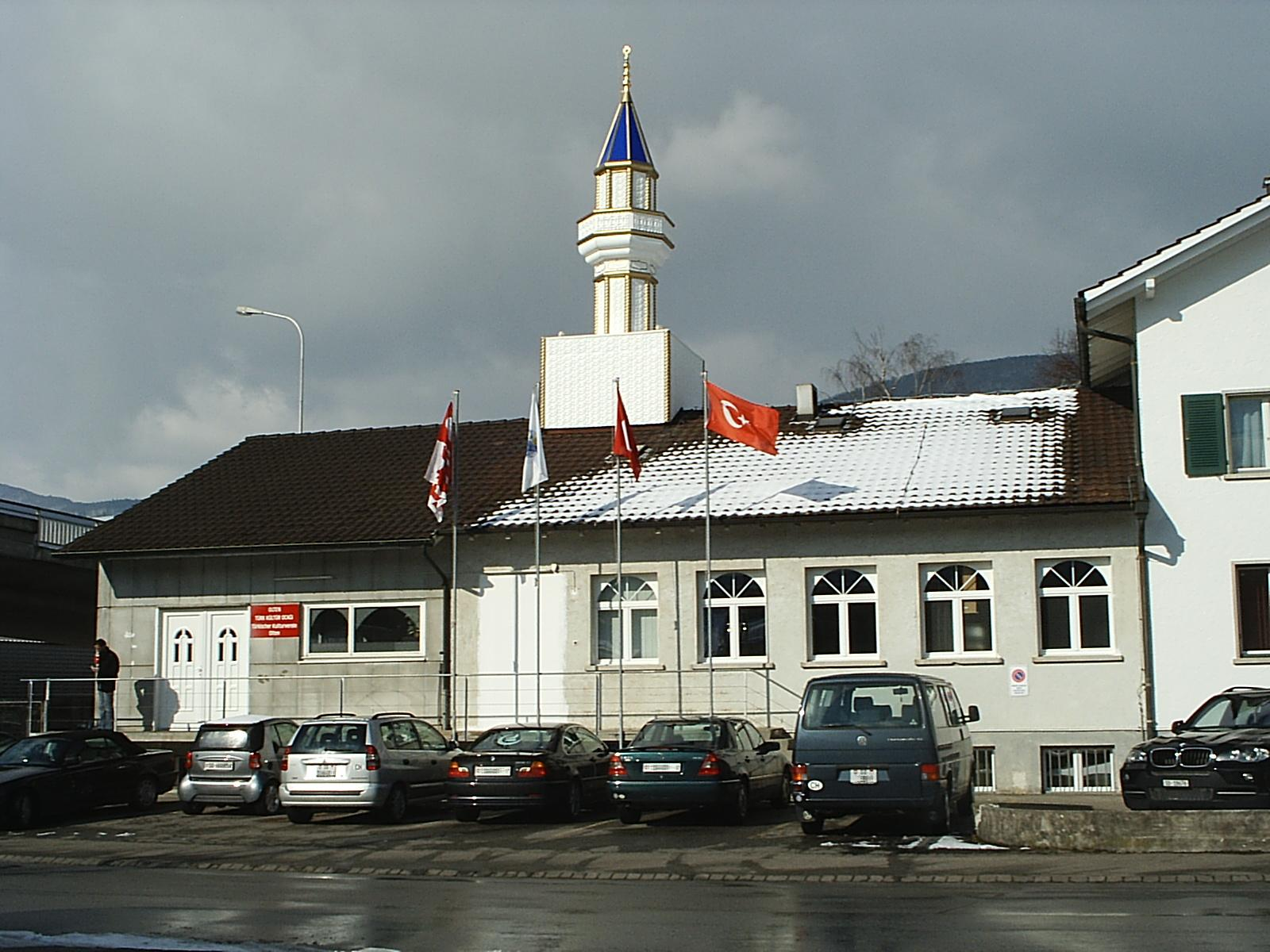
Mosque in Wangen bei Olten

As of 2000, there were 1,958 private households in the municipality, and an average of 2.3 persons per household. There were 640 households that consist of only one person and 115 households with five or more people. Out of a total of 1,967 households that answered this question, 32.5% were households made up of just one person and there were 13 adults who lived with their parents. Of the rest of the households, there are 617 married couples without children, 579 married couples with children. There were 88 single parents with a child or children. There were 21 households that were made up of unrelated people and 9 households that were made up of some sort of institution or another collective housing.

In 2000 there were 760 single family homes (or 69.2% of the total) out of a total of 1,099 inhabited buildings. There were 206 multi-family buildings (18.7%), along with 86 multi-purpose buildings that were mostly used for housing (7.8%) and 47 other use buildings (commercial or industrial) that also had some housing (4.3%). Of the single family homes 64 were built before 1919, while 106 were built between 1990 and 2000. The greatest number of single family homes (178) were built between 1946 and 1960.

In 2000 there were 2,104 apartments in the municipality. The most common apartment size was 4 rooms of which there were 671. There were 54 single room apartments and 669 apartments with five or more rooms. Of these apartments, a total of 1,919 apartments (91.2% of the total) were permanently occupied, while 104 apartments (4.9%) were seasonally occupied and 81 apartments (3.8%) were empty. As of 2009, the construction rate of new housing units was 1.5 new units per 1000 residents. The vacancy rate for the municipality, in 2010, was 0.44%.

The historical population is given in the following chart:

== Politics ==
In the 2007 federal election the most popular party was the SVP which received 25.89% of the vote. The next three most popular parties were the CVP (21.16%), the FDP (21.04%) and the SP (20.85%). In the federal election, a total of 1,605 votes were cast, and the voter turnout was 50.2%.

== Economy ==
As of 2010, Wangen bei Olten had an unemployment rate of 3.9%. As of 2008, there were 18 people employed in the primary economic sector and about 8 businesses involved in this sector. 578 people were employed in the secondary sector and there were 29 businesses in this sector. 1,957 people were employed in the tertiary sector, with 105 businesses in this sector. There were 2,407 residents of the municipality who were employed in some capacity, of which females made up 44.2% of the workforce.

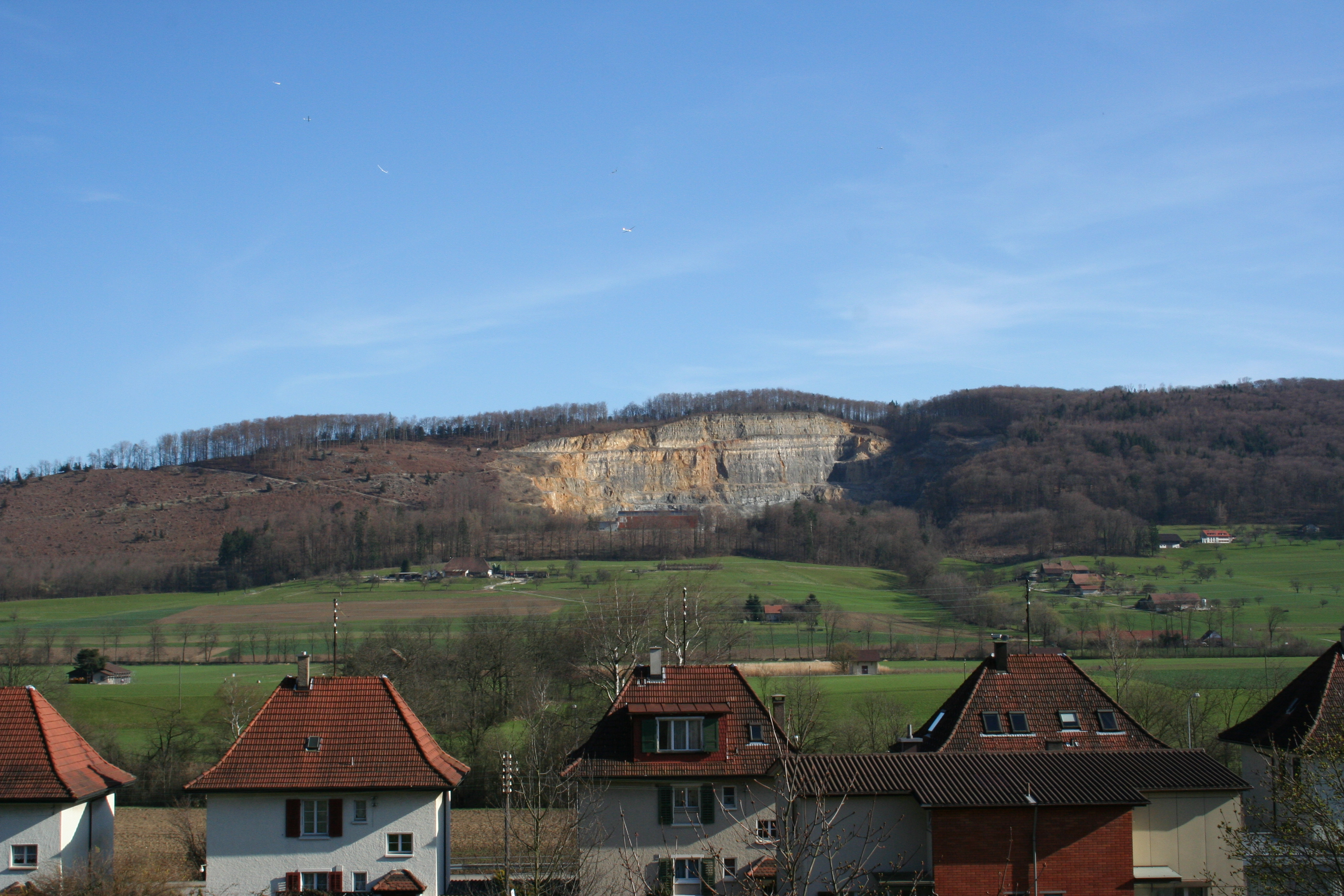
Born Mountain behind Wangen bei Olten

In 2008 the total number of full-time equivalent jobs was 2,150. The number of jobs in the primary sector was 12, all of which were in agriculture. The number of jobs in the secondary sector was 547 of which 433 or (79.2%) were in manufacturing and 108 (19.7%) were in construction. The number of jobs in the tertiary sector was 1,591. In the tertiary sector; 96 or 6.0% were in wholesale or retail sales or the repair of motor vehicles, 1,070 or 67.3% were in the movement and storage of goods, 56 or 3.5% were in a hotel or restaurant, 13 or 0.8% were in the information industry, 15 or 0.9% were the insurance or financial industry, 29 or 1.8% were technical professionals or scientists, 43 or 2.7% were in education and 112 or 7.0% were in health care.

In 2000, there were 1,506 workers who commuted into the municipality and 1,777 workers who commuted away. The municipality is a net exporter of workers, with about 1.2 workers leaving the municipality for every one entering. Of the working population, 22.9% used public transportation to get to work, and 51.1% used a private car.

== Religion ==
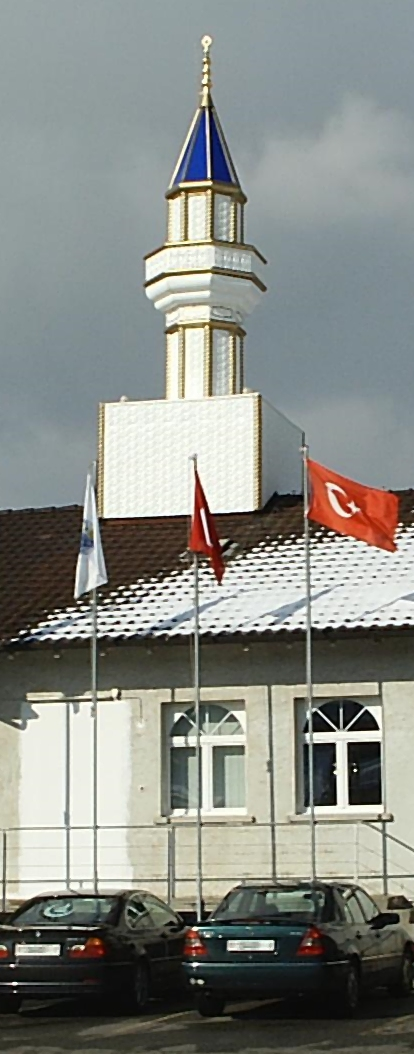
Minaret and Mosque of the Olten Turkish cultural association

From the 2000 census, 2,152 or 47.0% were Roman Catholic, while 1,356 or 29.6% belonged to the Swiss Reformed Church. Of the rest of the population, there were 79 members of an Orthodox church (or about 1.73% of the population), there were 44 individuals (or about 0.96% of the population) who belonged to the Christian Catholic Church, and there were 78 individuals (or about 1.70% of the population) who belonged to another Christian church. There were 250 (or about 5.46% of the population) who were Muslims. There were 10 individuals who were Buddhist, 3 individuals who were Hindu and 3 individuals who belonged to another church. 488 (or about 10.66% of the population) belonged to no church, are agnostic or atheist, and 116 individuals (or about 2.53% of the population) did not answer the question.

== Education ==
In Wangen bei Olten about 1,941 or (42.4%) of the population have completed non-mandatory upper secondary education, and 497 or (10.9%) have completed additional higher education (either university or a Fachhochschule). Of the 497 who completed tertiary schooling, 67.8% were Swiss men, 19.7% were Swiss women, 7.4% were non-Swiss men and 5.0% were non-Swiss women.

During the 2010–2011 school year there were a total of 515 students in the Wangen bei Olten school system. The education system in the Canton of Solothurn allows young children to attend two years of non-obligatory Kindergarten. During that school year, there were 92 children in kindergarten. The canton's school system requires students to attend six years of primary school, with some of the children attending smaller, specialized classes. In the municipality there were 266 students in primary school and 33 students in the special, smaller classes. The secondary school program consists of three lower, obligatory years of schooling, followed by three to five years of optional, advanced schools. 124 lower secondary students attend school in Wangen bei Olten.

As of 2000, there were 2 students in Wangen bei Olten who came from another municipality, while 118 residents attended schools outside the municipality.

== Minaret controversy ==
The construction of a six-meter (20 ft) high minaret in Wangen in 2005 led to a constitutional ban on their construction on 29 November 2009.

The contention involved the Turkish cultural association, which applied for a construction permit to erect a minaret on the roof of its Islamic community centre. The project faced opposition from surrounding residents, who formed a group to prevent the tower's erection. The Turkish association claimed that the building authorities improperly and arbitrarily delayed its building application. They also believed that the members of the local opposition group were motivated by religious bias. The Communal Building and Planning Commission rejected the association's application. The applicants appealed to the Building and Justice Department, which reverted the decision and remanded. As a consequence of that decision, local residents (who were members of the group mentioned) and the commune of Wangen brought the case before the Administrative Court of the Canton of Solothurn, but failed with their claims. On appeal the Federal Supreme Court affirmed the decision of the lower court. The minaret was eventually erected in July 2009.

While the case led to a ban on further minaret construction, it did not affect the four minarets already then in existence in Switzerland, including that of Wangen bei Olten.

== See also ==
- FC Wangen bei Olten
