= Mona Chollet =

Swiss writer

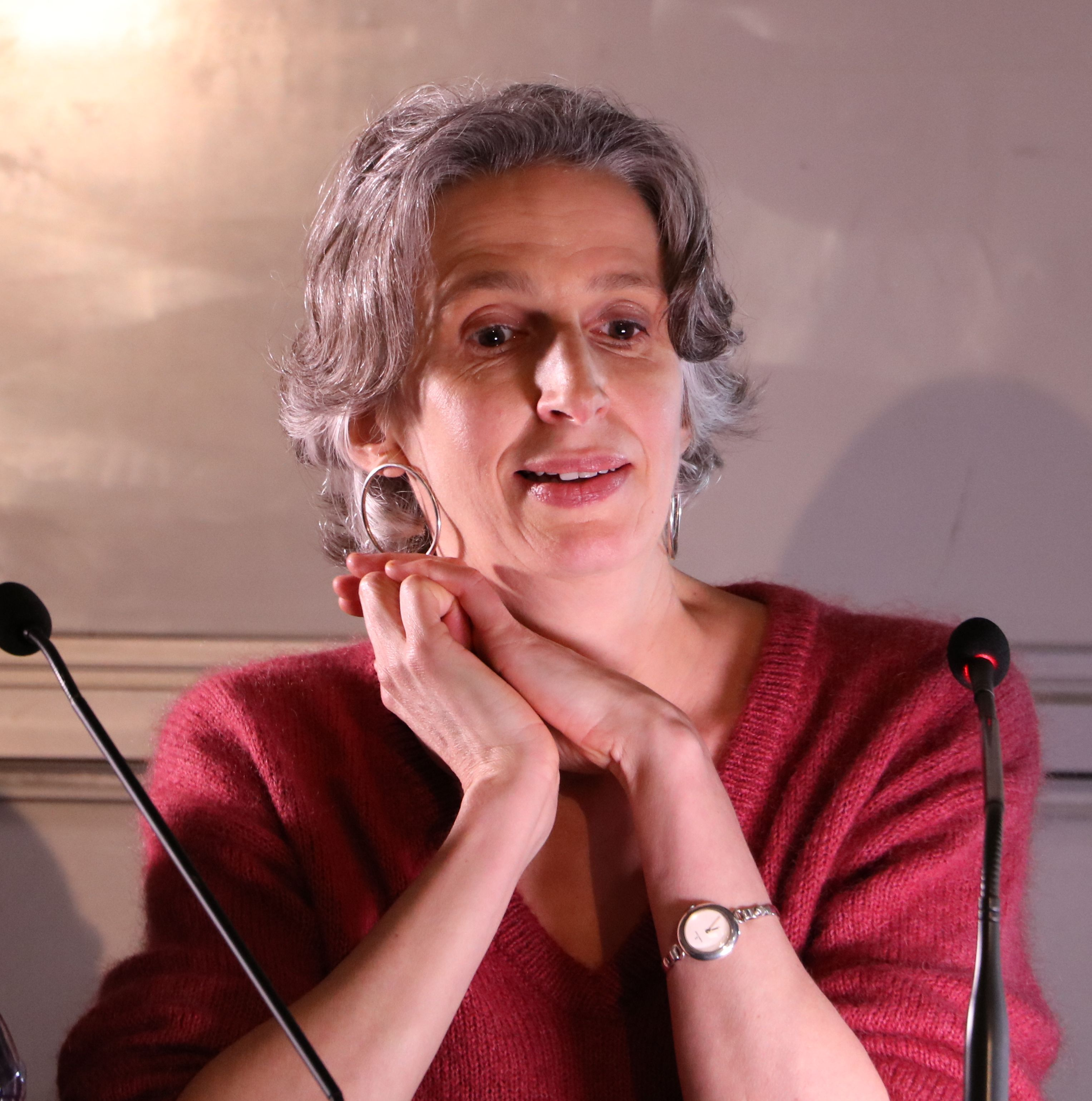
- Mona Chollet in 2020 in Paris
- Born: 1973
- Alma mater: École supérieure de journalisme de Lille
- Occupation: Essayist, journalist
- Works: Sorcières
- Awards: (2022)

Signature
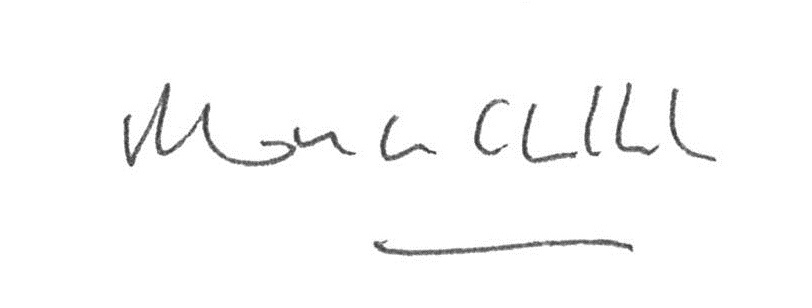

Mona Chollet is a Swiss journalist and author. She was chief editor at Le Monde diplomatique from 2007 until 2022. Her best-seller Sorcières (In Defense of Witches) has sold 370,000 copies in France. Born in Geneva in 1973, she is known as a feminist figure in France. Chollet studied at the École supérieure de journalisme de Lille.

== Books ==
- 2012: Beauté fatale
- 2018: Sorcières : La puissance invaincue des femmes, La Découverte
- 2021: Réinventer l'amour, Zones
- 2022: In Defense of Witches: The Legacy of the Witch Hunts and Why Women Are Still on Trial, translated by Sophie R. Lewis, Macmillan Publishers
- 2024: Reinventing Love: How the Patriarchy Sabotages Heterosexual Relations, translated by Susan Emanuel, Macmillan Publishers
- 2024: (fr) Résister à la culpabilisation : sur quelques empêchements d' exister, Zones
