= Libya–Switzerland relations =

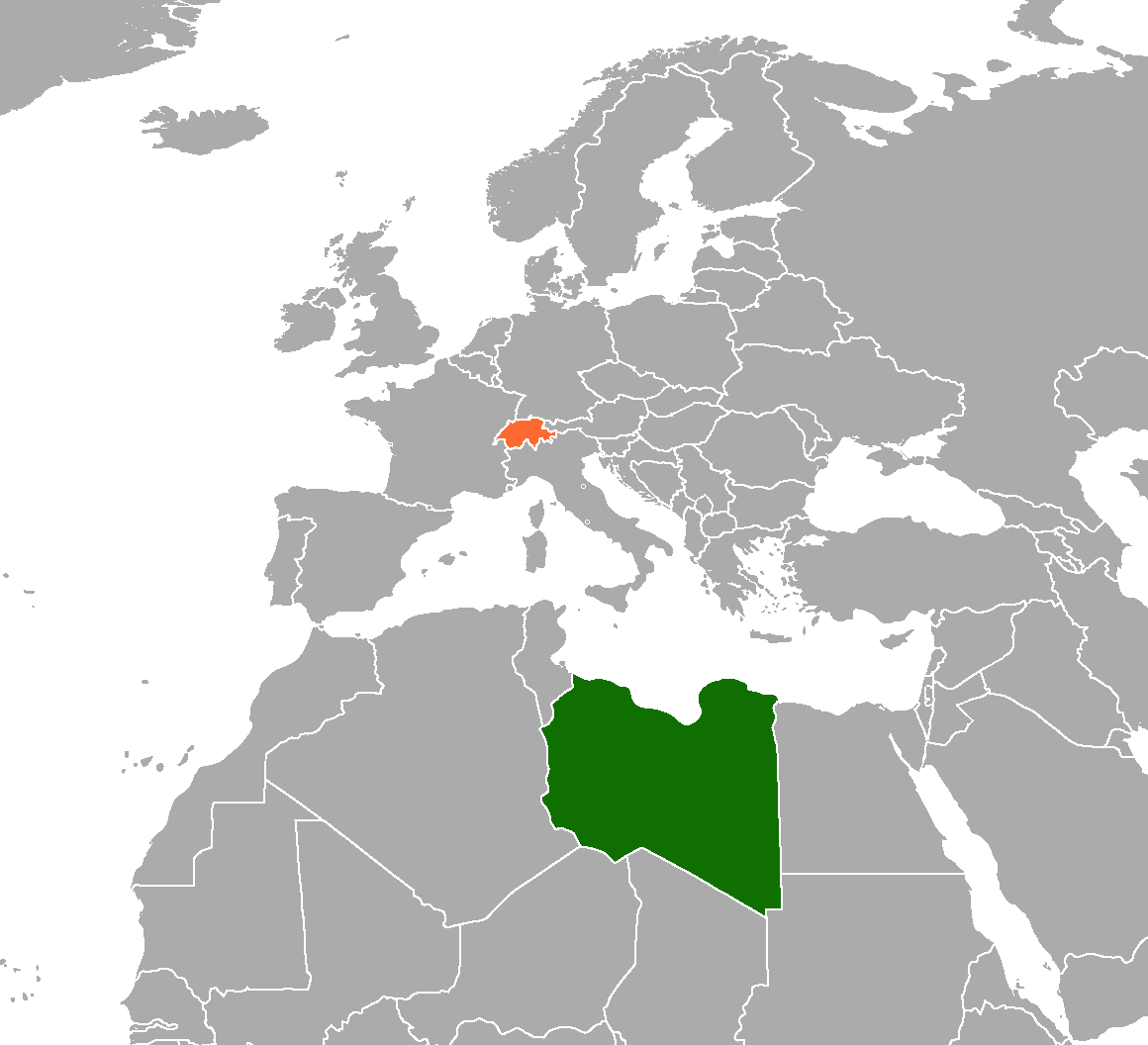

- Libya: Switzerland

Switzerland has considered formal relations with Libya's National Transitional Council (NTC) since 12 June 2011, dispatching an official envoy to Benghazi to "intensify its political relations with the Libyan National Transitional Council" and "signal its intent to strengthen its presence there".

Switzerland did not explicitly recognise the NTC, however it did state that "until the establishment of a legally elected government, the Transitional Council in Benghazi is the only legitimate partner of Switzerland in Libya". Previously, relations with Gaddafi had already been cut long before, and there had been humanitarian aid coordinated with the NTC for four months. On 22 August, while addressing a conference in Lucerne, Swiss Federal President Micheline Calmy-Rey confirmed that Switzerland has not recognised the NTC because the Swiss government's policy is to recognise states and not governments, but it will continue to deal exclusively with the NTC as its partner in Libya until the election of a new government.

Historically, there was a Swiss embassy in Tripoli, while Libya maintained an embassy in Bern. Switzerland had entertained friendly relations with Libya under Gaddafi before the 2000s, Libyan businessmen established bank accounts in Switzerland and trade increased. Libya supplied oil to Switzerland despite the 1982 embargo on Libyan petrol. There was a diplomatic dispute between Switzerland and the Libyan Arab Jamahiriya during 2008 to 2010, arising from the arrest of Libyan leader Muammar Gaddafi's son and daughter-in-law while in Switzerland.

== Diplomatic crisis of 2008–2010 ==
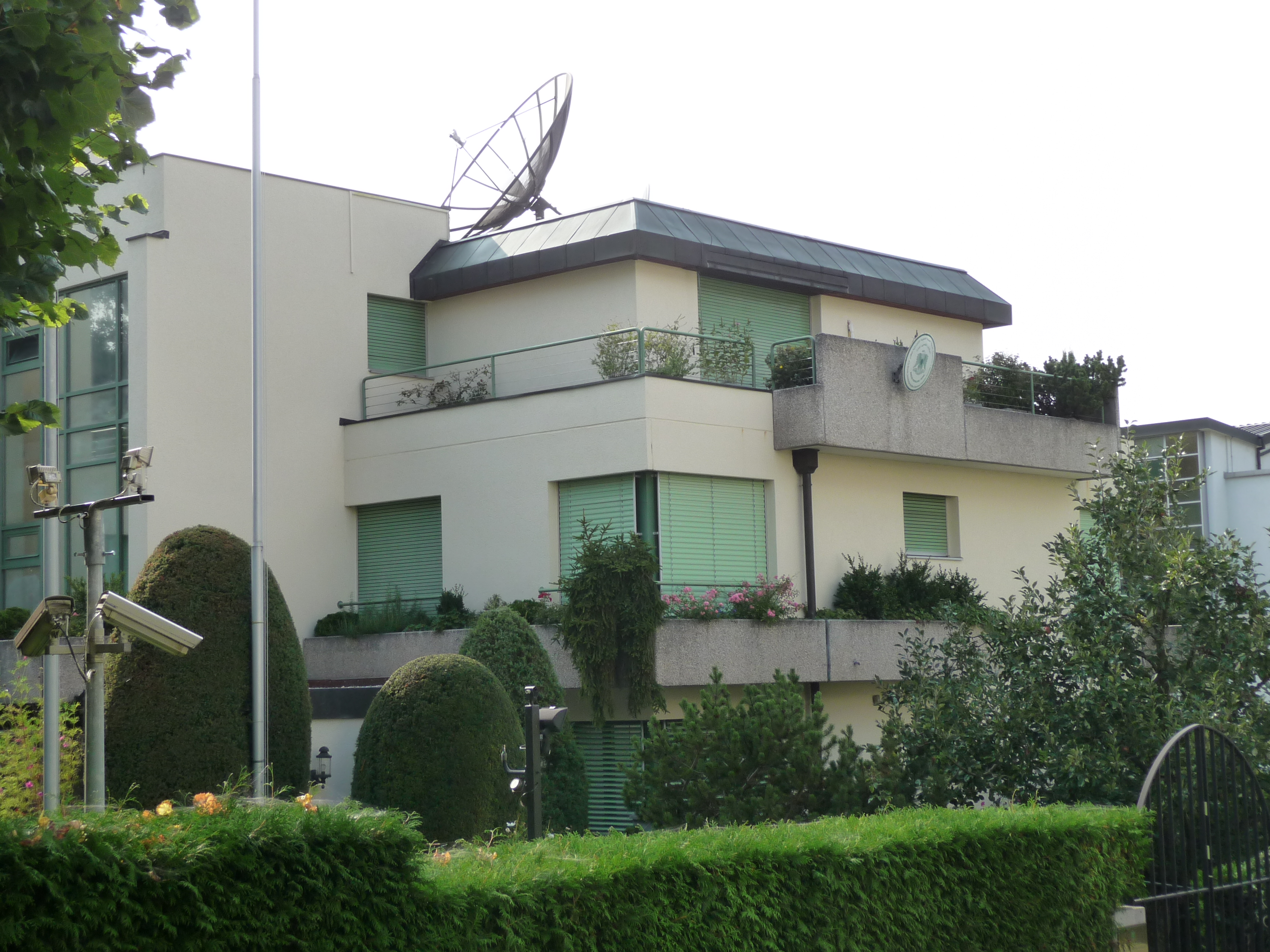
Embassy of Libya in Bern

Relations between the states began to sour in July 2008 when Switzerland arrested the Libyan leader's son, Hannibal Gaddafi, and daughter-in-law for allegedly beating their servants at a hotel. The pair were detained for two days and released.

Muammar al-Gaddafi retaliated against Switzerland "by shutting down local subsidiaries of Swiss companies Nestlé and ABB in Libya, arresting two Swiss businessmen for supposed visa irregularities, canceling most commercial flights between the two countries and withdrawing about $5 billion from his Swiss bank accounts".

Gaddafi's proposal to partition Switzerland, 2009

At the 35th G8 summit, Gaddafi publicly called for the dissolution of Switzerland, its territory to be divided among France, Italy and Germany.

To attempt to ease the tension between the countries and get the release of the two Swiss businessmen, Swiss President Hans-Rudolf Merz went to Tripoli in August 2009 to apologize for the arrests. This was criticized by the Swiss press and public, with numerous calls for his resignation.

In August 2009, Hannibal Gaddafi stated that if he had nuclear weapons, he would "wipe Switzerland off the map".

In February 2010, Gaddafi called for an all-out conflict against Switzerland in a speech held in Benghazi on the occasion of Mawlid. Gaddafi, in reference to the ban on new minarets, described Switzerland as an "idolator harlot" (كافرة فاجرة) and apostate. He called for a "jihad by all means", defining jihad as "a right to armed struggle", which he stated should not be confused with terrorism.

On 12 November 2009, Libyan prosecutors charged the two Swiss businessmen with visa irregularities, tax evasion, and failing to respect rules governing companies working in Libya. On 30 November, a Libyan court sentenced each of them to 16-month jail terms. The two men were also fined 2,000 Libyan dinars (US$1,671) each. The Libyan government said the businessmen's case and that of Hannibal Gaddafi are not linked.

In February 2010, Hamdani's sentence was overturned by a Libyan appeal court, while Göldi's sentence was reduced to four months. On 22 February, Libyan authorities demanded the surrender of Göldi. Police surrounded the Swiss embassy and threatened to raid the building. A number of EU ambassadors entered the Swiss embassy to demonstrate solidarity with Switzerland. Göldi ultimately surrendered to the Libyan police and was taken into custody. Hamdani was allowed to leave Libya and returned to Switzerland on 24 February. Göldi served his four-month prison sentence and was allowed to return home on 13 June 2010.

The Swiss military drew up plans for a rescue operation to free the two prisoners. Under the plan, Swiss commandos would infiltrate into Libya and break the men out of prison, possibly clashing with Libyan security forces in the process, and would then smuggle them out of the country. Multiple options for smuggling were considered. One idea was to smuggle them out of Libya aboard the ambassador's plane. Smuggling them across the border into Algeria was also considered, but the plan was dropped after the Algerian government demanded the extradition of Algerian dissidents living in Switzerland in exchange for its cooperation. Other plans called for exfiltrating them by sea on board a submarine, although it is unknown from where the Swiss government would procure a submarine, smuggle them south into Niger using Tuareg guides they recruited, or fly them out aboard a small airplane. The option of hiring a private British security company to free the men was also considered. Swiss security forces reportedly twice came close to carrying out the operation. According to Swiss MP Jakob Buechler, head of the Swiss Parliament's Defense Committee, the operation was imminent, and could have ended in a "total disaster".

In February 2010, the dispute with Switzerland spread, with Libya refusing to issue entry visas to nationals of any of the countries within the Schengen agreement, of which Switzerland is a part. This action was apparently taken in retaliation for Switzerland blacklisting 188 high-ranking officials from Libya by adding them to the Schengen Area visa blacklist, a move supported by some Schengen countries, but criticised by Italy as an abuse of the system. Italy was concerned about the effect this could have on its own diplomatic relationship with Libya, and especially on their combined efforts to stop illegal immigration from Africa into Europe. There was no official confirmation from Libya itself as to why they had taken this action. As a result of the ban foreign nationals from certain countries were not permitted entry into Libya at Tripoli airport, including eight Maltese citizens, one of whom was forced to wait for 20 hours before he was able to return home. In response, the European Commission criticised the actions, describing them as 'disproportionate', although no immediate 'tit-for-tat' response was announced.

Trade between the two nations suffered as a result of the diplomatic dispute, dropping nearly 40% during the first eight months of 2009. Traditionally, Switzerland ships pharmaceuticals, industrial equipment, and watches to Libya in return for petroleum. Following the Swiss ban on new minarets, Libyan government spokesperson Mohammed Baayou stated that Libya had imposed a "total" economic embargo on Switzerland, stating that the country would adopt alternative sources for products originally imported from Switzerland.
