= Sylvia Flückiger-Bäni =

Swiss politician (born 1952)

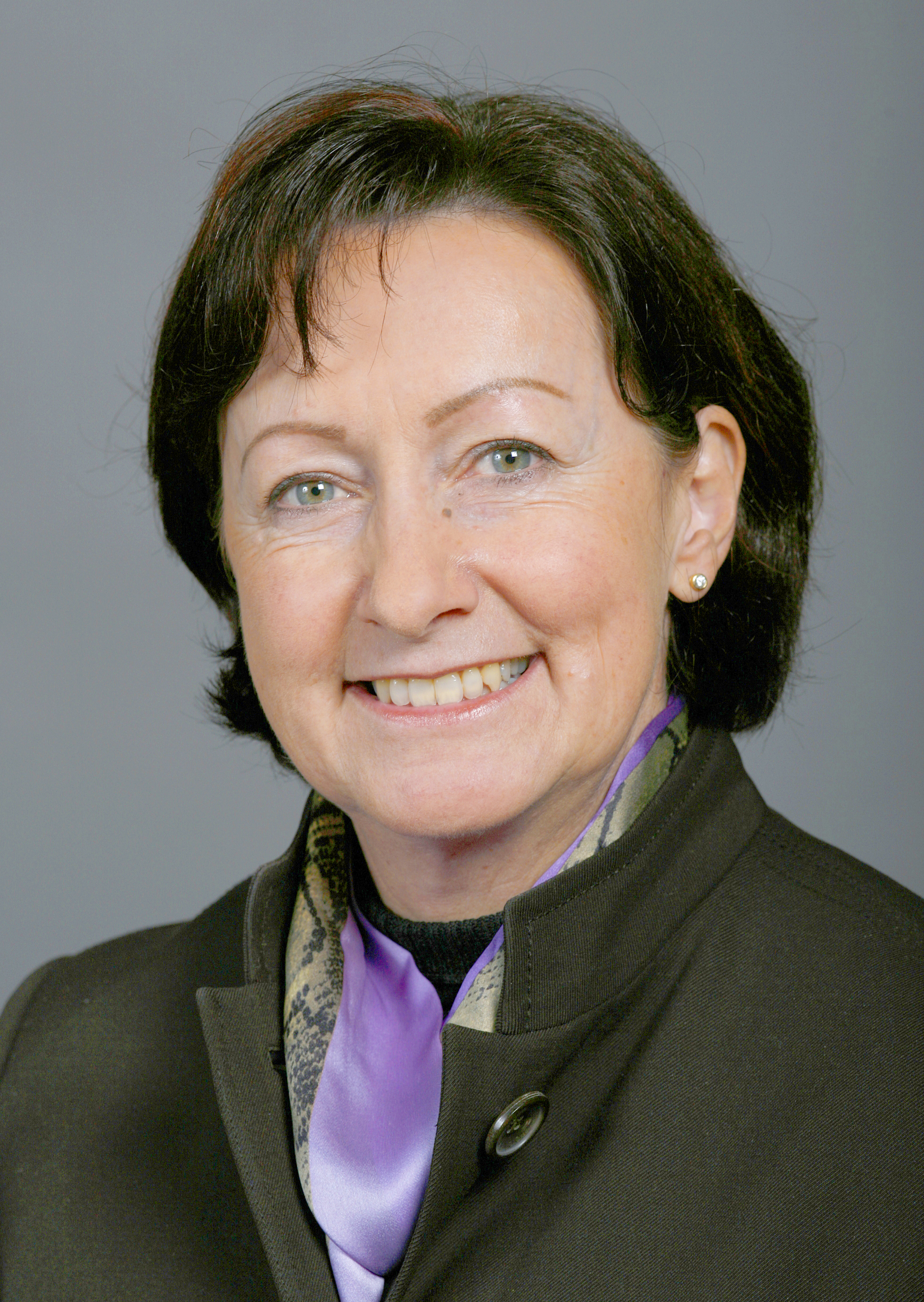

Sylvia Flückiger-Bäni (born 1 June 1952) is a Swiss politician, a member of the Swiss People's Party.

== Biography ==
Flückiger-Bäni has been a representative for Aargau at the National Council of Switzerland since 2007.

In 2009, she took part in the organising committee for the popular initiative for a ban on minaret construction.

She's a member of a Campaign for an Independent and Neutral Switzerland.
