= Ulrich Schlüer =

Swiss politician

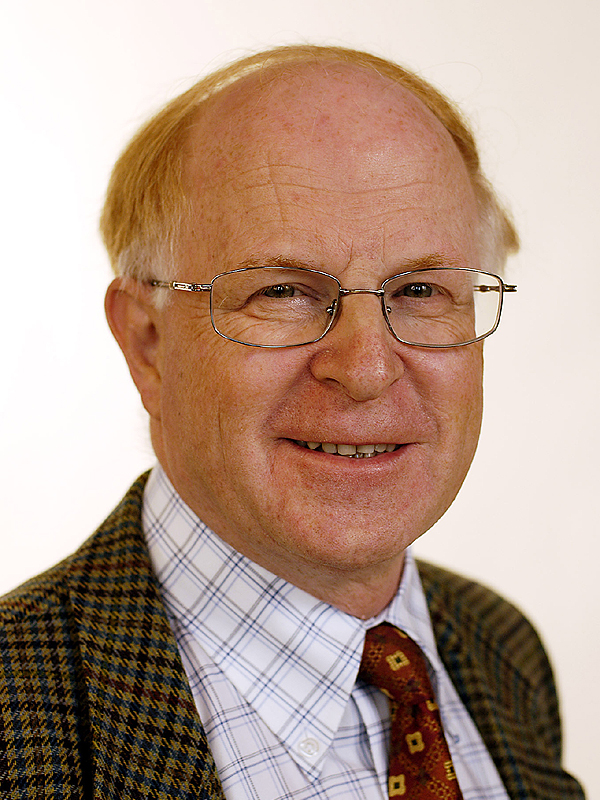

Member of the National Council
- In office 2 March 2009 – 4 December 2011
- Constituency: Zürich
- In office 4 December 1995 – 2 December 2007
- Constituency: Zürich

Personal details
- Born: 17 October 1944 (age 81) Zürich, Switzerland
- Party: Swiss People's Party
- Education: University of Zürich

Ulrich Schlüer (born 17 October 1944) is a right wing Swiss politician, member of the Swiss People's Party of the canton of Zürich.

== Biography ==
Schlüer studied History and German language at the University of Zürich, receiving a PhD in 1978. He married in 1970 and is the father of four children.

Schlüer acted as secretary to Swiss right-wing politician James Schwarzenbach, and in 1979 founded the nationalist-conservative Schweizerzeit newspaper.

He was the mayor of Flaach 1994-1998, and member of the Swiss National Council 1995 to 2007, when he lost his mandate in the 2007 federal election. However, upon the election of Ueli Maurer into the Swiss Federal Council, Schlüer inherited Maurer's seat in the parliament and thus regained his mandate on 2 March 2009 for the remainder of the 2008 to 2011 legislature. He was not reelected in the 2011 federal election.

In 2007, Schlüer's parliamentary immunity was suspended due to a lawsuit pressed by a journalist whom Schlüer had attacked in a Schweizerzeit article. In September 2007, Schlüer figured in an interview in The Independent, in which he commented on UN special rapporteur on racism Doudou Diène, who had expressed concern over the "racist and xenophobic dynamic" in the campaign pursued by Schlüer's party that

"He's from Senegal where they have a lot of problems of their own which need to be solved. I don't know why he comes here instead of getting on with that."

From 2007 to 2009, Schlüer spearheaded a federal initiative for the ban of minarets. He stated that "Islam is not only a religion. It’s an ideology aiming to create a different legal system. That’s sharia," and that "a minaret is different. It’s got nothing to do with religion. It’s a symbol of political power."

He once sought to establish a Swiss branch of the German anti-Islam activist Udo Ulfkotte's Pax Europa organisation, and in 2007 he was scheduled to hold a speech at a "Stop the Islamisation of Europe" rally in Cologne.
