= Walter Wobmann =

Swiss politician (born 1957)

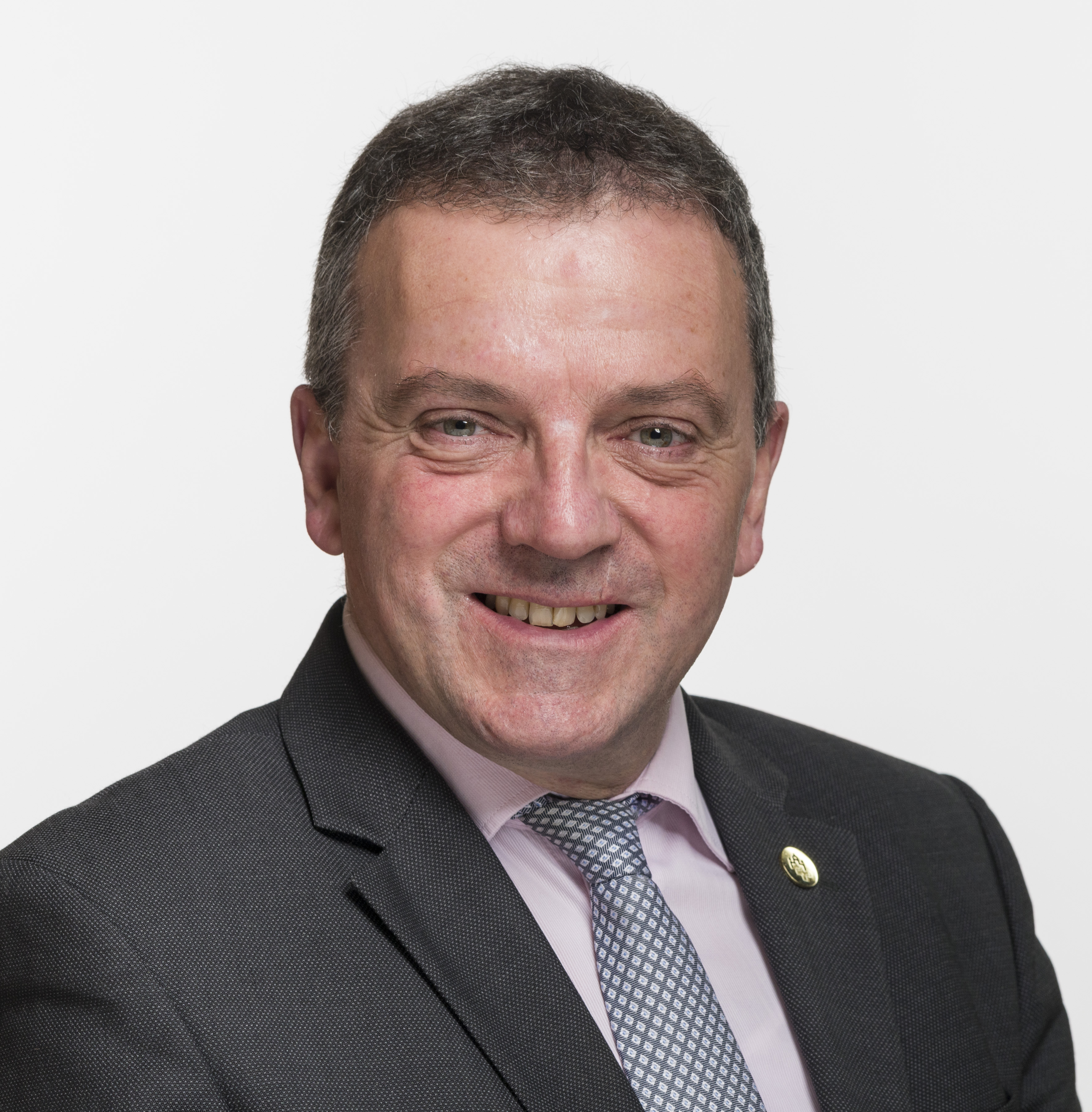

Member of the National Council
- In office 1 December 2003 – 3 December 2023
- Constituency: Solothurn

Personal details
- Born: 21 November 1957 (age 68) Entlebuch, Switzerland
- Party: Swiss People's Party

Walter Wobmann (born 21 November 1957) is a Swiss politician for the Swiss People's Party.

== Biography ==
Wobmann has held an MP position at the National Council of Switzerland since 2003. He is a member of the Campaign for an Independent and Neutral Switzerland.

Wobmann has campaigned against minarets in Switzerland as president of the committee in support of the Swiss minaret ban referendum in 2009. In 2016, Wobmann has introduced legislation to disallow the wearing of the hijabs in passport photos; this proposal was likened to the French ban on face covering. This would change current Swiss law, which allows the wearing of religious headscarves in photographs taken for Swiss passports and driver's licenses, so long as the face is identifiable.

== Notes and references ==
- Site internet de Walter Wobmann
