= Mediapart =

French independent online newspaper

- Seuls nos lecteurs peuvent nous acheter ("Only our readers can buy us")
- Format: Online
- Owner: Le Fonds pour une Presse Libre
- Founder: Edwy Plenel
- President: Carine Fouteau
- Editor-in-chief: Lénaïg Bredoux; Valentine Oberti
- General manager: Cécile Sourd
- Staff writers: ~70
- Founded: 2008
- Political alignment: Left-wing
- Language: French, English, Spanish
- Headquarters: Paris, France
- Circulation: 245,000 (paid subscribers) (as of January 2025)
- Website: mediapart.fr

Mediapart (French: [medjapaʁt]) is an independent nonprofit French investigative online newspaper created in 2008 by Edwy Plenel, former editor-in-chief of Le Monde. It is published in French, English, and Spanish. The newspaper is owned by Le Fonds pour une Presse Libre, a non-profit trust created to support freedom of the press. It has produced hundreds of investigations over the past 15 years, on political corruption, financial fraud, environmental crimes, as well as on sexual harassment and police violence. The New York Times has called Mediapart "France's leading investigative news site". By early 2025, Mediapart reached more than 245,000 paid subscribers.

== Profile ==
Mediapart's income is solely derived from paid subscribers. Unlike most French newspapers, Mediapart refuses to display any advertising and additionally refuses all commercial partnerships. Its official slogan is "Only Our Readers Can Buy Us". The New York Times has called Mediapart "France's leading investigative news site". The Financial Times described the editor as an "ex-Trotskyist rocking the French establishment". Mediapart consists of two main sections: Le Journal, run by professional journalists, and Le Club, a collaborative forum edited by its subscriber community. In 2011, Mediapart launched FrenchLeaks, a whistleblower website inspired by WikiLeaks.

On 8 May 2026, the National Communication Observatory in Niger suspended Mediapart due to its "repeated dissemination of content likely to seriously undermine public order, national unity, social cohesion, and the stability of republican institutions". The decision was criticised by the Committee to Protect Journalists as "censorship".

== Ownership ==
Mediapart was originally a for-profit business. In 2018, the newspaper was converted by shareholders into a non-profit. The newspaper is now owned by Le Fond pour une Presse Libre, a non-profit trust created to secure the financial and editorial independence of Mediapart in perpetuity and support freedom of the press. By design, trust board members don't have any authority over the newsroom.

== Landmark investigations ==
Mediapart has played a central role in the investigation and revelation of several major French political scandals, including:

- The Bettencourt affair in 2010.
- The Sarkozy-Gaddafi case in 2012. Mediapart made public two official Libyan documents suggesting the existence of a €50 million transfer from the Libyan regime to Nicolas Sarkozy's successful 2007 campaign for President of France. In June 2021, Mediapart reported that Michèle Marchand, an influential figure in the French celebrity press and proponent of Nicolas Sarkozy, had been taken into custody and interviewed over alleged witness tampering in relation to a witness in the Sarkozy corruption trial.
- The Cahuzac affair in 2012. Mediapart made public an audio recording from 2000 compromising Jérôme Cahuzac, then France's Minister for the Budget, in tax fraud.
- Former National Front candidate Jean-Claude Veillard's role in the payment of taxes to ISIS middlemen by Lafarge in 2013–2014, and Lafarge maintaining production in a plant in an ISIS-controlled area.
- The Benalla affair. On 31 January 2019, Mediapart released voice recordings attributed to Alexandre Benalla and Vincent Crase that suggested serious offenses committed by the two. On 4 February 2019, the office of Mediapart was subjected to a raid which failed as Mediapart refused it on the ground that the warrant was not authorised by a judge. The raid was in connection with a new investigation concerning a breach of Benalla's and Crase's privacy, prompted by the office of the Prime Minister of France. Neither of the two has launched action against Mediapart for breach of privacy. Mediapart sees in the raid an attempt by the government to reveal and intimidate the source of the voice recordings and to stifle journalistic rights to inform the public. Mediapart has never been subject to such a raid before, and received support from other press organisations and the European Federation of Journalists. The incident was reported by The New York Times, and also by The Washington Post.
- In July 2019, Mediapart revealed that €63,000 of public money had been spent by François de Rugy on the refurbishment of his official residence, including €19,000 on a dressing room, and published photographs of lobster and champagne dinners, implying profligacy at the taxpayers' expense whilst he was President of the National Assembly. On 16 July 2019 Rugy resigned as Ecology Minister.
- In April 2021, Mediapart revealed that luxury giant LVMH secretly paid Bernard Squarcini, the former head of French intelligence, to put journalist François Ruffin under illegal surveillance. Ruffin was preparing a documentary about billionaire Bernard Arnault, CEO of LVMH.
- In May 2022, Mediapart revealed that Patrick Poivre d'Arvor, one of the most powerful news anchors in France, had been accused of rape and sexual assault by at least 20 different women.
- On 28 September 2026, Mediapart published an article alleging that National Rally MEP Jordan Bardella made various antisemitic remarks during private written exchanges in 2013.. Bardella denied making the comments. On 1 October 2026, Mediapart disclosed that the comments were from Facebook Messenger conversations and that the data extraction was verified by a bailiff.
