= Éric Bonjour =

Swiss politician

Éric Bonjour (born 1973 in Switzerland) is a Swiss politician of the Swiss People's Party.

He has held an MP position at the Cantonal Council of Vaud since 11 March 2007.

In the summer of 2023, he made a mistake on his political campaign posters, getting the wrong date of the voting day.
