= Elsa Dorlin =

French philosopher

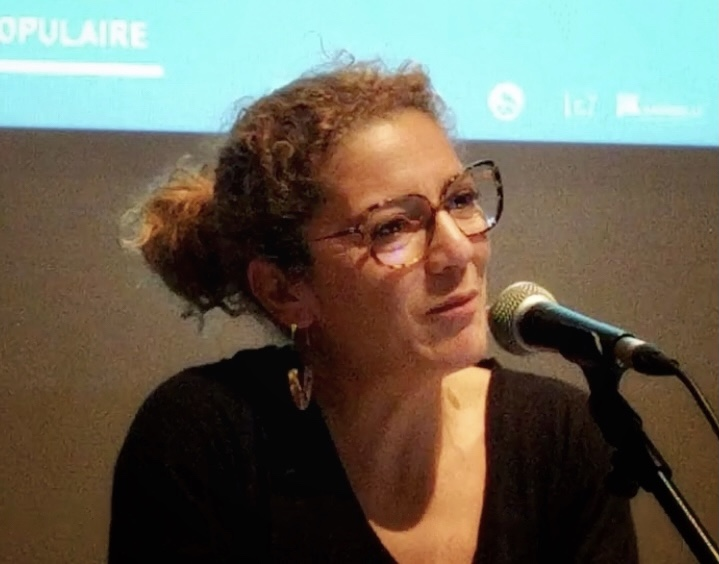
Elsa Dorlin, 2020

Elsa Dorlin (born 1973 or 1974 (age 51–52)) is a French philosopher and professor in the department of political science at University of Paris 8 Vincennes/St. Dénis.

== Career ==
Dorlin earned her PhD in philosophy in 2004 at University of Paris 4 – Sorbonne. Her dissertation, "Au chevet de la Nation : sexe, race et médecine : XVIIe-XVIIIe siècles" (transl. "At the Nation's bedside: sex, race and medicine in the 17th to 18th centuries") was supervised by Pierre-François Moreau.

In 2005 Dorlin became an assistant professor (maîtresse de conférences) in the history of philosophy, history of sciences in the philosophy department of the University of Paris 1 Panthéon-Sorbonne. In 2009, the French National Center for Scientific Research (CRNS) awarded Dorlin the bronze medal for her work on feminist theory and philosophy of gender. In 2011 she was elected full professor and joined the political science department of Paris 8.

Dorlin's 2017 book Se défendre : une philosophie de la violence (transl. Self-defense: A philosophy of violence) won the Frantz Fanon Book Prize from the Caribbean Philosophical Association in 2018. Verso Books is publishing an English edition.

== Works ==
- Se défendre : une philosophie de la violence, Paris, La Découverte, 2017, 252 pages
- Sexe, genre et sexualités: introduction à la théorie féministe. Philosophies. Paris: PUF. 2008. p. 153.
- La matrice de la race : généalogie sexuelle et coloniale de la nation française, Paris, La Découverte, coll. "Textes à l'appui / Genre et sexualité", 2006, 308 p.
- L'évidence de l'égalité des sexes : une philosophie oubliée au 17e siècle, Paris, L'Harmattan, 160 p., coll. "Bibliothèque du féminisme", 2001.
