= Daniel Streich =

Swiss military instructor

Personal details
- Born: Bulle, Switzerland
- Party: SVP (2003-2009); Conservative Democratic Party
- Profession: Politician

Military service
- Branch/service: Swiss Army
- Rank: Military Instructor

Daniel Streich (born in Bulle, Canton of Fribourg) is a Swiss military instructor, community council member and a former member of Swiss People's Party. A Protestant who converted to Catholicism and then to Islam, Streich left the Swiss People's Party over the campaign for the national ban on the construction of new minarets.

== Biography ==
Streich was a founding member and president of the Gruyères section of the party from 2003 to 2007. He converted to Islam from Catholicism in 2005. He explained that Islam offered him "logical answers to important life questions". He then resigned from his presidency in June 2007 citing his discomfort with certain "extremist" positions of the party, especially the campaign to ban nationwide the construction of new minarets. While Streich in 2007 stated that he had "many Muslim friends" he did not make public his personal conversion to Islam until early November 2009, when he left the Swiss People's Party in protest against their campaign for the impending referendum of 29 November 2009. He then participated in setting up the Conservative Democratic Party cantonal section.

Streich's case was reported by the Swiss daily newspaper 20 Minuten on 23 November, during the week preceding the referendum and the story was picked up by the tabloid newspaper Blick on the following day.

Streich's story first appeared in English in Tikkun Daily on 4 December 2009, as part of the international coverage on the referendum outcome. An embellished version of the story appeared on the website of Pakistani newspaper The Nation on 30 January 2010. It depicted Streich as a major Swiss politician who had been actively involved in anti-Muslim propaganda, had suddenly seen the error of his "evil ways" and then converted to Islam. The report even made Streich "the first man who had launched a drive for imposition of ban on mosques minarets", claiming that "Streich's conversion to Islam has created furore in Swiss politics, besides causing a tremor for those who supported ban on construction of mosques minarets" and that he "is ashamed of his doings now and desires to construct the most beautiful mosque of Europe in Switzerland", while Streich in fact never had campaigned against mosques or Islam, and also never revealed any intention of building a mosque.

== See also ==
- November 2009 Swiss referendum
- Religion in Switzerland
