= Éric Fassin =

French sociologist (born 1959)

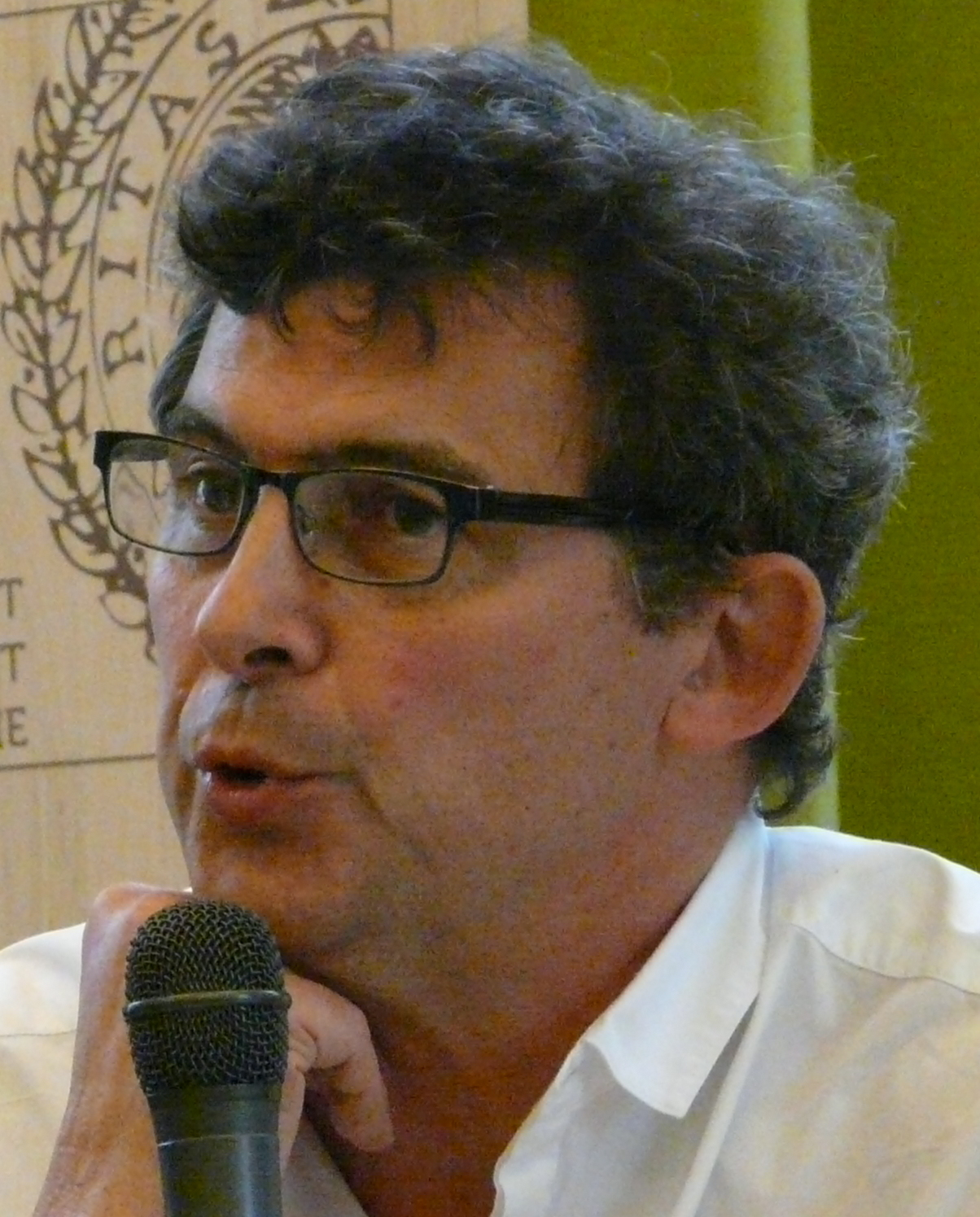
- Born: 1959 (age 66–67)
- Occupation: Sociologist

Academic work
- Main interests: Contemporary sexual and racial politics in France and the United States

Éric Fassin (French: [fasɛ̃]; born 1959) is a French sociologist.

== Career ==
Fassin taught in the United States from 1989 to 1994, at Brandeis University and NYU. From 1994 to 2012, he was an agrégé professor of sociology in the Department of Social Sciences at the École Normale Supérieure in Paris.

Fassin currently serves as a professor of sociology at the University of Paris 8 St-Denis. He is also a researcher at Institut de recherche interdisciplinaire sur les enjeux sociaux. He also served as a contributing editor of Public Culture, a scholarly journal published by Duke University Press.

== Research ==
Fassin's research focuses on contemporary sexual and racial politics in France and the United States and their intersections (in particular, concerning immigration issues in Europe) in a comparative perspective. He is author of L'inversion de la question homosexuelle (2005), Droit conjugal et unions de même sexe: mariage, partenariat et concubinage dans neuf pays européens (with Kees Waaldijk, 2008) and Le sexe politique: Genre et sexualité au miroir transatlantique (2009).

== Publications ==
- Au-delà du pacs with Daniel Borrillo, published by Presses Universitaires de France in 1999.
- Liberté, égalité, sexualités : Actualité politique des questions sexuelles with Clarisse Fabre, published by Belfond in 2004.
- L'inversion de la question homosexuelle (The Inversion of the Homosexual Question), published by Éditions Amsterdam in 2005.
- De la question sociale à la question raciale ? (From the Social Question to the Racial Question?) with Didier Fassin, published by La Découverte in 2006.
- He is currently working on The Rising Significance of Race in France for the University of Chicago Press, also with Didier Fassin.
- Éric Fassin; Carine Fouteau; Serge Guichard; Aurélie Windels (2014), Roms & riverains, Une politique municipale de la race (in French), La Fabrique, ISBN 978-2-35872-057-1
