= Michèle Marchand =

French businesswoman

- Born: 24 March 1947 (age 79); Vincennes, France
- Occupations: Businesswomen and Journalist
- Known for: Founder of Shadow & Co and Bestimage
- Children: 2

Michèle “Mimi” Marchand (born 24 March 1947) is a French entrepreneur and PR consultant. She worked for various gossip publications such as Gala, Paris Match, Public, Closer and Voici and founded her own agency for paparazzo images called Bestimage. She developed close relationships with politicians such as Nicolas Sarkozy and Emmanuel Macron (as well as his wife Brigitte). Marchand was also involved in various controversies.

== Biography ==
Marchand was born shortly after the end of World War II as the only daughter of a hairdresser couple and former communist resistance fighters from Vincennes. At 16, she ran away, got married, became pregnant and had two children. She separated from her partner and started working for an automotive supplier. She then worked in car repair shops in Paris and discovered the city's nightlife. Marchand migrated to California in the 1980s, where she worked in the car import business before returning to France. In 1986, she was sentenced to six months in prison for forging checks and writing checks she knew she could not cover. On appeal in 1989, she was acquitted of forgery and her sentence was reduced to four months on probation. In the mid-1990s, she was arrested while driving a van carrying 500 kilograms of cannabis from Morocco. She was accompanied by her then-husband, the criminal Maurice Demagny. While the latter was sentenced to six years in prison for drug trafficking, Michèle Marchand received a three-year suspended sentence in 1998. She had met Demagny in the Fleury-Mérogis pre-trial prison.

In 1996, after running lesbian bars in Paris, she joined the gossip magazine Voici as a freelancer. During the 1990s, she created dossiers on various celebrities and soon became indispensable for the publication. After a controversy surrounding a fake interview with an alleged bodyguard of Diana, Princess of Wales, she left the magazine in 1998 and founded the company Shadow & Co in a neighboring building, which provides Voici with numerous reports. In 2006, she caused a stir with a picture of presidential candidate Ségolène Royal on the beach in a bikini, which was seen as a political taboo. At the end of 2007, she was involved in the launch of PurePeople, a website that published information and photos of celebrities and was very successful. In 2010, she sold her shares in PurePeople for €500,000, but continued to work for the company as an external service provider. In 2011, she founded Bestimage, one of France's largest celebrity photo agencies. Marchand is considered to be very well connected, and in 2014, rumors arose that she was behind the articles in the magazine Closer that revealed an alleged affair between President François Hollande and actress Julie Gayet. She was also the first to provide pictures of the affair between Nicolas Sarkozy and Carla Bruni.

Michèle Marchand was a major donor to the UMP party. As a supporter of Nicolas Sarkozy, she sat in the front row at some of his campaign events in the run-up to the 2016 primaries. In 2017, she was one of the communicators for Brigitte and Emmanuel Macron's media campaign for Macrons presidential election, after she was introduced to the Macron couple by entrepreneur and investor Xavier Niel in the spring of 2016. The Macrons also gave their agency Bestimage exclusive rights to their “private image”. She befriended them and advised them on PR matters. However, she was reportedly dismissed in 2018 after the publication of the juicy biography dedicated to her, "Mimi ”. Deep in debt and threatened with multiple lawsuits, Marchand sold her agency Bestimage to Xavier Niel in June 2024.

== Criminal cases ==
In addition to her criminal past, Marchand was accused or suspected of forging documents in several cases, including a false marriage certificate of Vincent Lindon and Caroline of Monaco and a fabricated interview with Princess Diana's bodyguard. She denied the allegations against her.

The relationship between Gérald Marie and his modeling agency, Elite Model Management, has also caused controversy. The agency has been accused of sexually exploiting young models. In 1999, Marchand is said to have helped Marie survive a public controversy over this issue. The two knew each other from the Parisian nightlife. Marchand's new partner, an intelligence officer with contacts in the French police, was also useful.

According to reports, Marchand provided accommodation and support to Alexandre Benalla, a former security adviser to President Emmanuel Macron, during the height of the scandal surrounding him in 2018. Banella was convicted of impersonating a police officer and beating demonstrators on May 1, 2018. He also had contacts with Russian oligarchs and used diplomatic passports illegally.

In June 2021, Marchand was charged with allegedly influencing witnesses and forming a criminal organization in connection with the retraction of statements made by businessman Ziad Takieddine regarding the alleged Libyan financing of Nicolas Sarkozy's 2007 presidential campaign.

In August 2021, Marchand was charged with "receiving stolen goods" and "breach of professional secrecy" in connection with the publication of photos of the arrest of Petr Pavlensky, who played a key role in the scandal surrounding former government spokesman Benjamin Griveaux. Pawlenski had published intimate photos of Griveaux.

In April 2024, Marchand was accused of blackmailing TV host Karine Le Marchand, demanding money in exchange for not releasing compromising photos of the host's underage daughter. She was subsequently put on trial. In July 2025, Marchand was convicted of blackmail over a February 2020 incident in which she told Karine Le Marchand that she had paid an unknown photographer to block the publication of images showing the TV personality's underage daughter leaving police custody. The Paris court sentenced Marchand to an 18 month suspended prison sentence. She was also fined 25,000 euros.
