= Fatima Ouassak =

French activist (born 1976)

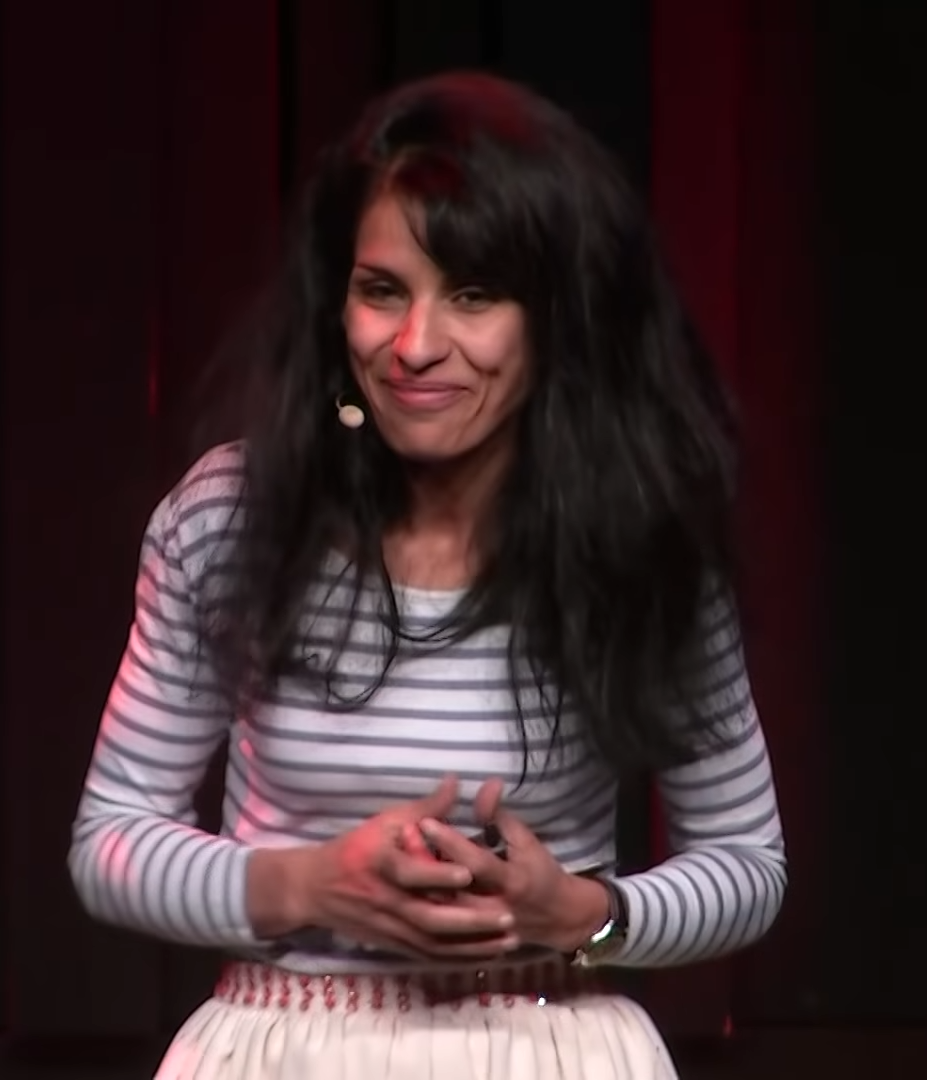
- Ouassak in 2019
- Born: 1976 (age 49–50); Rif, Morocco

Fatima Ouassak (born 1976) is a French essayist, speaker, public policy consultant, and environmentalist, feminist and anti-racist activist, of Moroccan origin. She is co-founder of the Front de Mères collective, a parents' union in working-class neighborhoods. Her book The Power of Mothers received the Public Prize for Feminist Essay in 2021.

== Biography ==
Fatima Ouassak was born in the Rif region, in the north of Morocco. In 1977, at the age of one, she left Morocco with her family to join her father in France. She grew up in Lille-Sud and studied at the Lille Institute of Political Studies; she became an author and activist.

Mother of two children, she lives in Bagnolet, in the department of Seine-Saint-Denis.

== Activities ==
=== Mothers' Front ===
In 2016, Fatima Ouassak founded the "syndicat Front de mères" (Mothers' Front Union) with Diariatou Kebe. She is its spokesperson, with Goundo Diawara.

=== Contributions ===
Along with fourteen other feminists, such as Lauren Bastide, Alice Coffin, Camille Froidevaux-Metterie, she contributed to the book Sororité edited by Chloé Delaume, published in 2021. Her text focuses on one of her favorite topics, the fight of mothers against child abuse. This is also the subject of the entry she wrote in the book Feu, abécédaire des féminismes présent edited by the philosopher Elsa Dorlin published in October 2021.
