= Edwy Plenel =

French journalist

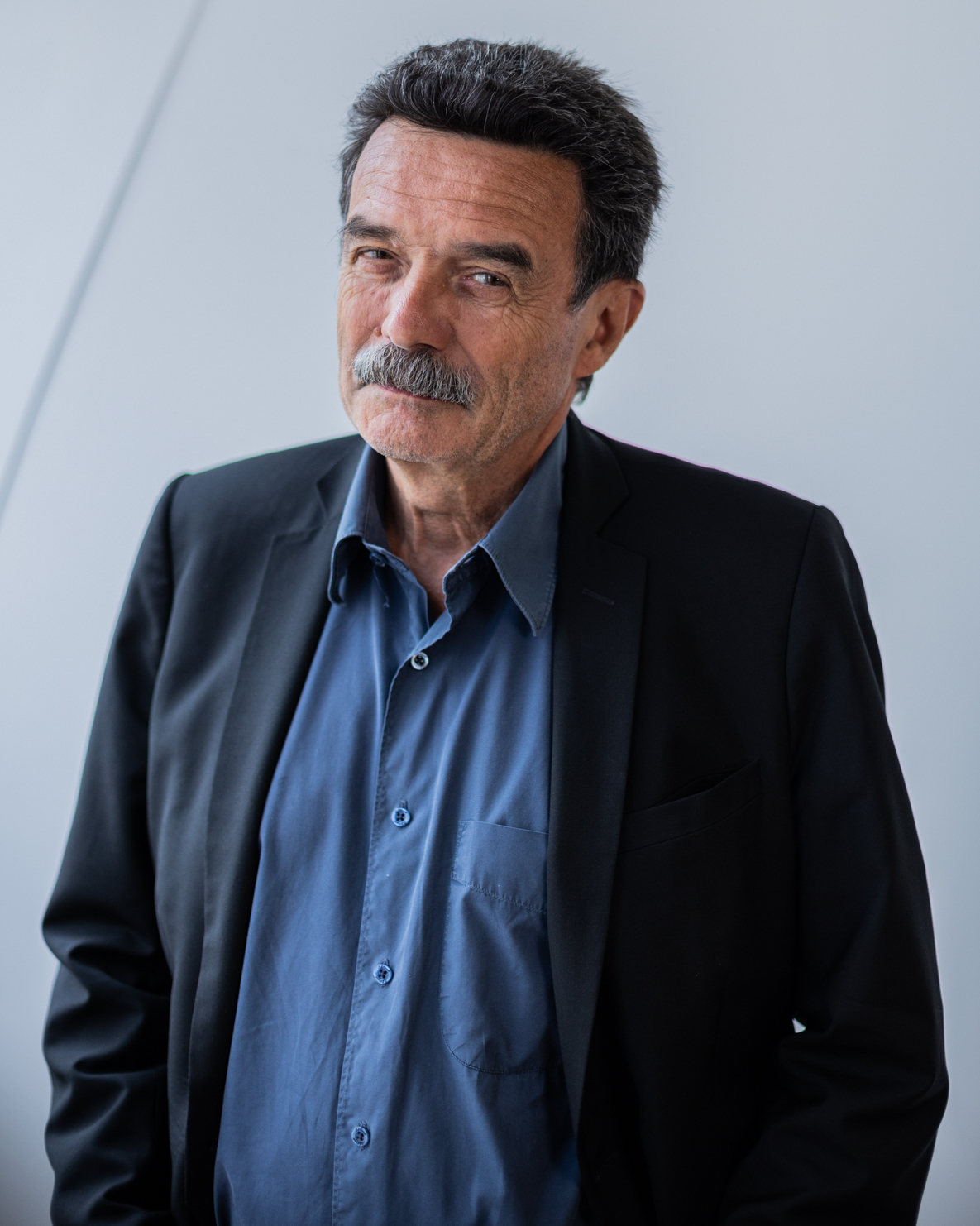
- Born: Hervé Edwy Plenel; 31 August 1952 (age 74); Nantes, France
- Education: Sciences Po
- Occupation: Journalist
- Employer(s): Le Monde (1980–2005); Mediapart (2008–present)

Hervé Edwy Plenel (French pronunciation: [ɛʁve edwi plenɛl]; born 31 August 1952) is a French political journalist.

== Biography ==
=== Early life ===
Plenel spent his childhood in Martinique and his youth in Algiers, Algeria. He studied at the Institut d'Études Politiques de Paris.

=== Career ===
His career began in 1976 as a journalist for Rouge, the official newspaper of the Trotskyist Revolutionary Communist League (LCR – Ligue communiste révolutionnaire). He briefly worked for Le Matin de Paris in 1980, before moving to the French newspaper Le Monde, where he worked as the paper's education editor (1980–82), legal columnist (1982–90), a reporter (1991), head of the legal department (1992–94), chief editor (1994–95), assistant editorial director (1995–96), editor (1996–2000), and editor-in-chief (2000–04).

From 1985 to 1986, while working for Le Monde, he was one of the targets of a wiretapping scandal perpetrated by a secret presidential anti-terrorism cell, which he had implicated in the "Irish of Vincennes" affair for framing three Irish nationals on terrorism charges.

In 2001, he was awarded the Prix Médicis essai for his essay Secrets de jeunesse (Secrets of Youth).

He resigned from the editorial staff of Le Monde in November 2004, and left the newspaper on 31 October 2005. He is currently the publisher of Mediapart, an Internet-based subscription journal which he founded in 2008.

In 2023, Plenel accused the actress and filmmaker Maïwenn of assaulting him in a Parisian restaurant, alleging she grabbed him by the hair before spitting in his face.

== Bibliography ==
- L'Effet Le Pen (with Alain Rollat), Paris, La Découverte-Le Monde, 1984.
- La République inachevée. L'État et l'école en France, Paris, Payot, 1985; Stock, 1997; Biblio « Essais », 1999.
- Mourir à Ouvéa. Le tournant calédonien (with Alain Rollat), Paris, La Découverte-Le Monde, 1988.
- Voyage avec Colomb, Paris, Le Monde-Éditions, 1991 (in Japanese : Shobun-sha, 1992).
- La Part d'ombre, Paris, Stock, 1992; Gallimard, « Folio Actuel », 1994.
- Un temps de chien, Paris, Stock, 1994; Gallimard, « Folio Actuel », 1996.
- Les Mots volés, Paris, Stock, 1997; Gallimard, « Folio Actuel », 1999.
- L'Épreuve, Paris, Stock, 1999.
- Secrets de jeunesse, Paris, Stock, 2001 (prix Médicis essai); Gallimard, « Folio », 2003.
- La Découverte du monde, Paris, Stock, 2002; Gallimard, « Folio Actuel », 2004 (in Korean : Maumsan, 2005).
- Procès, Paris, Stock, 2006 (prix du Journal du Centre); Gallimard, « Folio », 2007.
- Le Journaliste et le Président, Paris, Stock, 2006.
- Chroniques marranes, Paris, Stock, 2007.
- Combat pour une presse libre. Le manifeste de Mediapart, Paris, Galaade, 2009 (in Spanish : Edhasa, 2012; in Arabic : Sefsafa, 2015).
- Le Président de trop. Vertus de l'antisarkozysme, vices du présidentialisme, Paris, Don Quichotte, 2011.
- Le 89 arabe (with Benjamin Stora), Paris, Stock, 2011.
- Notre France (with Farouk Mardam Bey and Elias Sanbar), Paris, Sindbad/Actes Sud, 2011.
- Le Droit de savoir, Paris, Don Quichotte, 2013; Seuil, « Points », 2014.
- Dire non, Paris, Don Quichotte, 2014; Seuil, « Points », 2015.
- Pour les musulmans, Paris, La Découverte, 2014; La Découverte/Poche, 2016 (prix Fetkann de la mémoire), (in Arabic : Al Doha Magazine, 2015; in English : Verso, 2016).
- La Troisième Equipe. Souvenirs de l'affaire Greenpeace, Paris, Don Quichotte, 2015; Seuil, « Points », 2016.
- Dire nous. Contre les peurs et les haines, nos causes communes, Paris, Don Quichotte, 2016.
- Voyage en terres d'espoir, Paris, Editions de l'Atelier, 2016.
- Le devoir d'hospitalité, Paris, Bayard, 2017.
- La valeur de l'information, Paris, Don Quichotte, 2018; Seuil, « Points », 2019.
- La victoire des vaincus. À propos des gilets jaunes, Paris, La Découverte, 2019, 190 pages.
- La sauvegarde du peuple. Presse, liberté et démocratie, Paris, La Découverte, 2020.
- Tous les films sont politiques. Avec Costa-Gavras, Seuil, « Points », 2021.
- Le Président de trop, nouvelle édition augmentée de La question française, La Découverte-Poche, 2021.
- À gauche de l'impossible, La Découverte, Cahiers libres, 2021.
- L'Épreuve et la Contre-épreuve. De la Yougoslavie à l'Ukraine, Paris, Stock, 2022.
- L'Appel à la vigilance. Face à l'extrême droite, Paris, La Découverte, 2023.
