= History of Manchester City F.C. (1965–2001) =

History of an English football club

This page chronicles the history of Manchester City in further detail from 1965 to 2001. See History of Manchester City F.C. for a history overview of Manchester City.

== The dark days (1963–1965) ==
Following relegation in 1963, George Poyser became manager and purchased Derek Kevan, Jimmy Murray and Johnny Crossan whilst promoting homegrown players Alan Oakes and Glyn Pardoe but could not arrest the decline in the club's fortunes. The nadir came on 16 January 1965, when a mere 8,015 spectators watched the team lose 2–1 to Swindon Town, a record low for a league match at Maine Road. The club finished the season eleventh in the Second Division, at that point the lowest finish in the club's history; Poyser resigned shortly before the end of the season. Poyser soon resigned in Easter 1965 leaving City manager-less heading into the 1965–66 season.

== The glory years (1965–1976) ==
=== Mercer-Allison appointment (1965) ===
During the close season 1964–1965 the club was overhauled by chairman Albert Alexander and he appointed Joe Mercer as the club's new manager on 13 July 1965. Mercer had had moderate success at Aston Villa, where he won the inaugural League Cup, but left after suffering a stroke in 1964. Mercer however wanted to stay on as manager at Villa feeling he had more to give the club despite his apparent ailments, but when Mercer felt he was badly treated he decided to move on with Villa citing that the split was "by mutual consent".

Consequently, he needed a younger, fitter, assistant to run training sessions, and chose the flamboyant and dynamic Malcolm Allison, who had recently departed Plymouth Argyle after a spell as manager. Allison had other job offers from Stanley Matthews at Port Vale, Raich Carter at Middlesbrough and Joe Mercer at City which he took after admitting he had always claimed a love to City after listening to them on the radio during the [1933 FA cup final).

=== Progress (1965–1966) ===
In the first season under Mercer, City won the division Two championship and gained promotion back to the top flight whilst making important signings in Mike Summerbee and Colin Bell, who later formed a formidable partnership with Francis Lee upfront.

The following 1966–67 season was fairly unremarkable for City with a 15th-place finish, though the team ended the season on a run of just four losses in seventeen games.

=== From 15th to champions (1967–68) ===
After Manchester United won the league title in 1966–67, United player Paddy Crerand bet Malcolm Allison £10 that Manchester City would never again attract crowds of 30,000. His bet proved foolish and he had to pay up within weeks of the new season, as in 1967–68 City would go on to claim the league title.

City's season opened with a 0–0 draw at home to Liverpool. City were awarded a penalty, but new captain Tony Book hit it wide. Two defeats followed, at Southampton and Stoke. The Stoke defeat led to a tactical switch. Mike Summerbee, who played wide on the right at the start of the season, was moved to centre-forward. The change reaped immediate dividends, with Summerbee playing a leading role in a 4–2 win against Southampton. This was the first in a run of five straight wins, after which Manchester City had caught up with the league leaders. During this run of wins young winger Stan Bowles made his league debut, scoring twice in a 5–2 win against Sheffield United.

City's search for a new goalkeeper ended with the signing of Ken Mulhearn from Stockport County on 21 September, in a deal that involved City's back-up goalkeeper Alan Ogley moving in the opposite direction. Harry Dowd kept goal in the next match, a 1–0 defeat at Arsenal, but then dislocated a finger, prompting a debut for Mulhearn in the season's first Manchester derby. Mulhearn was reputedly so nervous before the match that Allison locked him in the medical room until he calmed down. Colin Bell scored the opener after five minutes, but two Bobby Charlton goals meant a win for United. In the second half of the match, Bowles exchanged punches with Brian Kidd, though neither man was sent off, largely thanks to the intervention of their respective captains. The derby loss was followed by a third consecutive defeat, at Sunderland.

A couple of days after the Roker Park defeat, Manchester City completed the signing of centre-forward Francis Lee from Bolton Wanderers for a club record £60,000. During negotiations Mercer stated to Lee that "we feel we've got the start of a good side. We are just one player short, and we think you are that player." Lee made his debut in a 2–0 win at home to Wolverhampton Wanderers, the start of an 11 match unbeaten run, including a 6–0 win against Leicester City.

Midway through their unbeaten run, City faced Tottenham Hotspur at home in snowy conditions, in a match televised on Match of the Day. As the teams came out onto the frozen pitch, commentator Kenneth Wolstenholme called the Manchester City team as "the most exciting team in England". Aided by a modification to the studs on their boots suggested by Tony Book, City produced one of the best footballing performances in their history. One Spurs player was quoted as saying, "It was extraordinary. City moved like Olympic speed skaters while we were falling around like clowns on a skid patch." Tottenham took an early lead through Jimmy Greaves, but Bell equalised before half-time, and in the second half City besieged Tottenham, scoring three more times to win 4–1. After the match City trailed the league leaders by only a single point. The match was named as Match of the Day's "Match of the Season", and as the only match at Maine Road that season to be recorded for television, is the foremost recorded example of the 1967–68 team in action.

The unbeaten run came to an end at Christmas, with back-to-back defeats in matches against West Bromwich Albion causing the club to fall to fourth place. The team commenced 1968 with a seven match unbeaten run, which came to an end with a defeat at Don Revie's Leeds United. A visit to local rivals and league leaders Manchester United then followed. United took an early lead, but City rallied to win 3–1.

In late April, after City won 1–0 against Sheffield Wednesday and title rivals United lost to West Bromwich Albion, City were in a position where winning their final three games would all but guarantee the championship. In the first of the three, a home match against Everton, City won 2–0 in a match featuring Tony Book's first league goal for the club. Next was Tottenham Hotspur at White Hart Lane. City took a 3–0 lead before half time, eventually winning 3–1.

Going into the final match, City were level on points with neighbours United. Liverpool were three points behind, but had a game in hand, so could still win the title if both City and United faltered. City faced tenth-placed Newcastle United at St James' Park; United were at home to bottom-half Sunderland. Bookmakers made United slight favourites for the title. Mike Summerbee opened the scoring on 13 minutes, but Newcastle soon equalised. Neil Young made it 2–1, but again Newcastle equalised. A second strike by Young was disallowed for offside, and at half-time the score was 2–2. Straight after half-time Young scored again, and Francis Lee scored a fourth at 63 minutes. A late Newcastle goal set up a nervy finish, but City held on to win 4–3 and secure the title.

=== FA Cup triumph (1968–69) ===
1968–69 FA Cup – Route to victory
Round	Team	Score	Opposition
Round 3	Manchester City	1–0	Luton Town
Round 4	Manchester City	0–0	Newcastle United
Round 4 replay	Manchester City	2–0	Newcastle United
Round 5	Manchester City	4–1	Blackburn Rovers
Quarter-final	Manchester City	1–0	Tottenham
Semi-final	Manchester City	1–0	Everton
Final	Manchester City	1–0	Leicester City

City won the FA Cup in 1969, a victory that gave City qualification to challenge the European Cup Winners Cup the following season, which they won. The defending champions struggled in the league however and finished 13th whilst also disappointing in the European Cup, being knocked out in the first round by Fenerbahçe and the third round of the League Cup.

=== Cup Winners Cup and League Cup double (1969-70) ===
Jeff Astle opened the scoring for Albion after five minutes, becoming the first player to score in the final of both the League Cup and FA Cup at Wembley. He had already scored in the first leg of the 1966 League Cup Final four years previously, however that was at West Ham's Boleyn Ground. City equalised through Mike Doyle to send the game into extra-time, and eventually won 2–1, with Glyn Pardoe scoring the winner.

Honours were shared in the league matches between the two sides during the 1969–70 league season, with Manchester City gaining a 2–1 victory at Maine Road and West Bromwich Albion winning 3–0 at The Hawthorns. City went on to achieve a 10th-place finish in the First Division

Manchester City qualified for the Cup Winners' Cup by winning the FA Cup in the 1968–69 season. It was only Manchester City's second European campaign. Their maiden entry into European competition, an appearance in the 1967–68 European Cup, saw the club exit in the opening round. Manchester City played the away leg first in every round. Their first tie was against Spanish club Athletic Bilbao, who were themselves managed by an Englishman, Ronnie Allen. In the first leg, City recovered from a two-goal deficit to secure a 3–3 draw. The home leg was a comfortable 3–0 win.

Manchester City were without winger Mike Summerbee with a leg injury that had troubled him since the League Cup Final the previous month. However Summerbee was fit enough to be named as a substitute.

Manchester City started strongly, particularly Francis Lee; The Guardian correspondent wrote "Lee, indefatigable and nigh irresistible continually embarrassed the Gornik defence in the early stages". Lee had the first chance of the match, a close range shot which was saved by Kostka. Manchester City took the lead in the 12th minute. Lee cut in from the left wing, escaping a tackle from Alfred Olek, and struck a fierce shot. Goalkeeper Hubert Kostka parried the ball, only for it to land at the feet of Neil Young for a simple finish. Shortly after City defender Mike Doyle sustained an ankle injury after colliding with Stefan Florenski. Manchester City played on with ten men for a period as Doyle received treatment from trainer Dave Ewing, but the defender was unable to continue. Substitute Ian Bowyer replaced him. The change prompted an alteration in formation, in which Colin Bell switched to a deeper position. Shortly before half-time, Young won the ball after loose play from Florenski, which put him clear on goal. As Young moved into the penalty area Kostka rushed out of his goal and upended him, leaving the referee no option but to give a penalty. Lee struck the spot-kick with power into the centre of the goal. Kostka's legs made contact with the ball, but the force of the shot carried it into the net to make it 2–0. Górnik got a goal back midway through the second half, but there were no more goals and the match finished 2–1.

Winning manager Joe Mercer said "the heavy rain in the second half ruined the game" and that he was "quite happy with the performance of our team, although the technical level was rather low in the second half".

Mercer and Allison record – 1966–1972
Season	League	FA Cup	League Cup	Europe	Charity Shield	Notes
1966–67	15th	Quarter-final	Third round	did not participate	did not participate	
1967–68	1st	Fourth round	Fourth round	did not participate	did not participate	
1968–69	13th	Champions	Third round	European Cup – First round	Winners	
1969–70	10th	Fourth round	Champions	Cup Winners Cup – Champions	Runners-up	
1970–71	11th	Fifth round	Second round	Cup Winners Cup – Semi-finalist	did not participate	CWC defending champions 'jinx'
1971–72	4th	Third round	Third round	did not participate	did not participate	Were 1st in league and 4 points in front in mid-March

=== Cup Winners Cup semi-final (1971) ===
Manchester City again impressed in the 1971 Cup Winners Cup and reached the semi-final in a hard-fought quarter-final. City met Górnik Zabrze in the quarter-final, the team City defeated to claim the title the year before in 1970. Zabrze beat City 2–0 in the first leg to a jubilant crowd of 100,000 in Poland and after the match the City duo of Francis Lee and Mike Summerbee practised reverse psychology and celebrated their loss on the pitch in front of the bemused Polish supporters and players. City won the return leg 2–0 at Maine Road to secure a replay at a neutral venue, which was Copenhagen with 12,100 City supporters making the trip to Denmark to see their team defeat Zabrze 3–1.

The win secured a place in the semi-final against the only English team left, Chelsea FC. However City chances of progressing to the second successive final were severely hindered before the match even started with Alan Oakes, Colin Bell, Mike Doyle, Glyn Pardoe and Mike Summerbee all unavailable due to injury before the first leg. It was perhaps no surprise City lost the leg at Stamford Bridge 1–0 and Tommy Booth and key goalkeeper Joe Corrigan were injured for the return leg at Maine Road, losing again 1–0.

=== Four point lead but throw away the championship (1972) ===
"I have to hold my hands up – I cost Manchester City the 1972 league championship."

— Rodney Marsh whose playing style did not suit his City team-mates

1971 brought a change in the nature of the management partnership, with Mercer taking the title of general manager, and media-friendly Allison being promoted to Team Manager. In the 1971–72 season City had been sailing to the championship, assembling a 4-point lead in mid-March, a large margin at a time during English football when only 2 points were awarded for a win.

However, City's season petered out with a poor run of results at the end of the season and a fourth-place finish, which many blamed on the signing of crowd-pleaser Rodney Marsh, who, despite his talent, was regarded as disrupting the balance of the team.

=== Joe Mercer resignation (1972) ===
"Joe and I were a perfect partnership. Apart from the tenseness of those last few months, I think we had barely two disagreements in all the time we worked together. I never for one moment regretted working with Joe Mercer, and I know he felt the same way about working with me. We had some fabulous times together and built some fabulous teams. The Mercer-Allison years at Manchester City were the best years of my life. If Joe was still with us today, I think he'd say the same"

— Malcolm Allison on Joe Mercer

The close season saw the break-up of the Mercer-Allison management team, with Mercer leaving for Coventry City as his relationship with Allison deteriorated. The final straw came when Mercer claimed that his parking space and his name from the door of his office had been removed, whilst chairman Peter Swales later said, "the board had to choose between Malcolm Allison and Joe Mercer – and we chose Malcolm Allison". Sympathy for Mercer was stronger than for Allison who was now seen as ruthless in getting to Mercer's manager role he craved., as Allison later said on Mercer's untainted departure, "Joe had controlled his personal position with great skill. He had come out smelling roses."

Despite the animosity and discord between the two, Mercer was and is still seen with great affection and his widow Norah Mercer later said that Joe Mercer's time at City was one of the most enjoyable periods of his life, adding that he loved the supporters and players at the club.

=== Allison finally takes over but instability ensues (1972–1974) ===
Manchester City were invited to take part in the 1972 FA Charity Shield in which they beat Aston Villa 1–0. From 1972 to 1974 Manchester City underwent several changes both on and off the field. Businessman Peter Swales gained control of the club, and Malcolm Allison resigned midway through a poor 1972/73 season that almost saw the club relegated. Long-serving coach Johnny Hart took over the side and steered them to survival and a decent finish, which earned him the manager's position on a permanent basis at the end of the season. His term as manager proved short-lived however, as health problems forced him to quit a few months into the following season. Norwich City manager Ron Saunders was recruited as Hart's replacement, and under his management the club reached the 1974 League Cup final, which they narrowly lost. The team struggled to maintain consistency in Division One however, and Saunders was sacked with a month of the season left to go, and City not safe from relegation by any means.

Manchester City record – Post Mercer under Allison, Hart, Saunders and Book (1972–1979)
Season	League	FA Cup	League Cup	Europe	Charity Shield	Notes
1972–73	11th	Fifth round	Third round	UEFA Cup – First round	Winners	
1973–74	14th	Fourth round	Runners-up	did not participate	Runners-up	
1974–75	8th	Third round	Third round	did not participate	did not participate	
1975–76	8th	Fourth round	Champions	did not participate	did not participate	
1976–77	2nd	Fifth round	Second round	UEFA Cup – First round	did not participate	
1977–78	4th	Fourth round	Quarter-final	UEFA Cup – First round	did not participate	
1978–79	15th	Fourth round	Quarter-final	UEFA Cup – Quarter-final	did not participate	

=== Tony Book stability (1974–1979) ===
Former club captain Tony Book took charge of first team affairs, restoring some stability. Book was a loyal member of the club, even prior and after his spell as manager still remained in a variety of different roles and most importantly Book had the respect of his players and his appointment was a popular choice.

City's final match of the 1973–74 season was against arch-rivals Manchester United, who needed to win to stand a chance of avoiding relegation. City themselves were still in with a mathematical chance of relegation, though merely avoiding defeat would put survival beyond all doubt. Former United player Denis Law scored with a backheel to give City a 1–0 win and confirm the relegation of their rivals. The game was remembered too for Denis Law's non-celebration as he condemned his former side to the second tier of English football whilst Mancunian teammate at City Mike Doyle could not contain his delight as he ran the length of the pitch to congratulate Law.

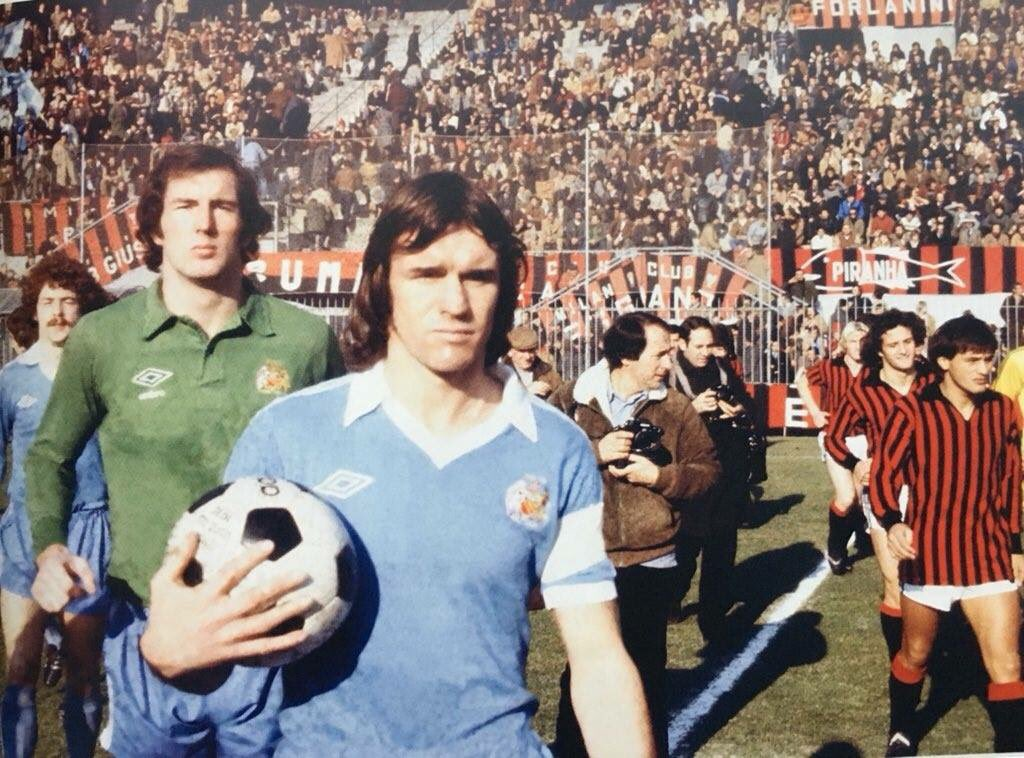
Players of Manchester City and Milan before start of their match from third round of 1978–79 UEFA Cup.

During the 1973–74 close season City were a side in transition as legends Mike Summerbee and Francis Lee leaving and Denis Law retiring. Book opened the chequebook and signed Joe Royle and Asa Hartford who both proved themselves as wise buys. Overall City were moderately successful during Tony Book's five-year tenure, winning the League Cup in 1976 by beating Newcastle United 2–1 in the final, and finishing runners-up in the League in 1977 after Liverpool pipped City to the title by 1 point. Furthermore, Book had a good record in the following years in the League Cup reaching the quarter-finals on two occasions and reached the UEFA Cup quarter-finals in 1979.

== Mid-table mediocrity and relegation (1979–1983) ==
=== Allison returns (1979–1980) ===
A long period of decline followed the success of the 1960s and 1970s. Despite their cup runs, 1978-79 proved to be a poor league campaign, with a three-month winless run mid-campaign leaving them in serious danger of relegation. Malcolm Allison rejoined the club, initially as chief coach, and helped them to a run of form that saw them survive relatively comfortably. At the end of the season, Book was relieved of his duties (though kept on in the role of general manager) and Allison was appointed as sole manager, but squandered large sums of money on unsuccessful signings whilst selling stars such as Asa Hartford, Gary Owen and Peter Barnes. One was the signing of Steve Daley, which broke the British transfer record. A succession of managers then followed – seven in the 1980s alone. City had made a very poor start to the 1980–81 season, costing Allison his job.

=== John Bond takes over (1980–1983) ===
Allison was replaced by another exuberant character in John Bond who, ironically, had replaced former City manager Ron Saunders at Norwich City seven years earlier. Bond galvanised the side by signing experienced reinforcements to complement promising youngsters at the club, oversaw an upturn in results which saw City finish in a more respectable mid-table position, whilst the following season saw a 10th-place finish and was highlighted by a 3–1 win over Liverpool at Anfield.

Bond took Manchester City to the final of the 1981 FA Cup with a surprise 1–0 win over Ipswich Town at Villa Park in the semi-finals. The win saw City reach Wembley for the FA Cup Final against Tottenham Hotspur. A 1–1 draw meant the final went to a replay, a game they lost 3–2, made famous by Ricky Villa's goal (the game also featured a spectacular volley by City's Steve MacKenzie).

During their FA Cup run, Bond guided Manchester City to a 6–0 win over former club Norwich City at Maine Road in the fourth round. At the end of this thrilling game, Bond jumped from an upper tier of the stand into the player's tunnel, in order that he could offer his commiserations to son Kevin, who was playing for Norwich. An act which Danny Baker describes as "attempting a bit of James Bond" in the Match of the 80s nostalgia TV show 16 years later. Two years later, with City in mid-table and seemingly going nowhere (though at the same time not seeming in danger of relegation), Bond was sacked after a dispute with the board and replaced by coach John Benson.

== Decline and manager merry-go round (1984–1989) ==
Unfortunately, a catastrophic loss of form under Benson (11 points from 19 games) saw City crash out of the First Division after losing to Luton Town on the last day of the season, when a draw would have prevented relegation.

Billy McNeill took over as manager during the summer, and after a near-miss the following season, achieved promotion in 1985. This renaissance proved short-lived however, as City barely avoided being immediately relegated in 1986, and McNeill left the club to become manager of Aston Villa a few weeks into the next season.

Jimmy Frizzell became manager for the rest of the season, but failed to prevent relegation with City finishing the season in second-bottom place and suffering relegation alongside Aston Villa and Leicester City. Frizzell then stepped down to be succeeded by Mel Machin.

== Good progress (1987–1993) ==
City won promotion back to the First Division in 1989 after finishing runners-up in the Second Division under the management of Mel Machin.

1989–90 was a difficult season and Machin was sacked in November with relegation looking a real possibility. Probably the season's most memorable match was a 5–1 drubbing of locals rivals Manchester United, a dejected Alex Ferguson later said it was the most "embarrassing" managerial defeat of his career. Machin was replaced by former Everton manager Howard Kendall, who achieved survival and built the foundations for a good start to the 1990–91 season.

But he returned to Everton in November 1990 and was replaced by 34-year-old midfielder Peter Reid. Reid's first two seasons at the helm brought fifth-place finishes, but City did not qualify for the UEFA Cup because only the second and third teams qualified for the competition in these years. City finished a respectable ninth in the inaugural Premiership but Reid lost his job after only two games of the 1993–94 season.

== Another decline (1993–1998) ==
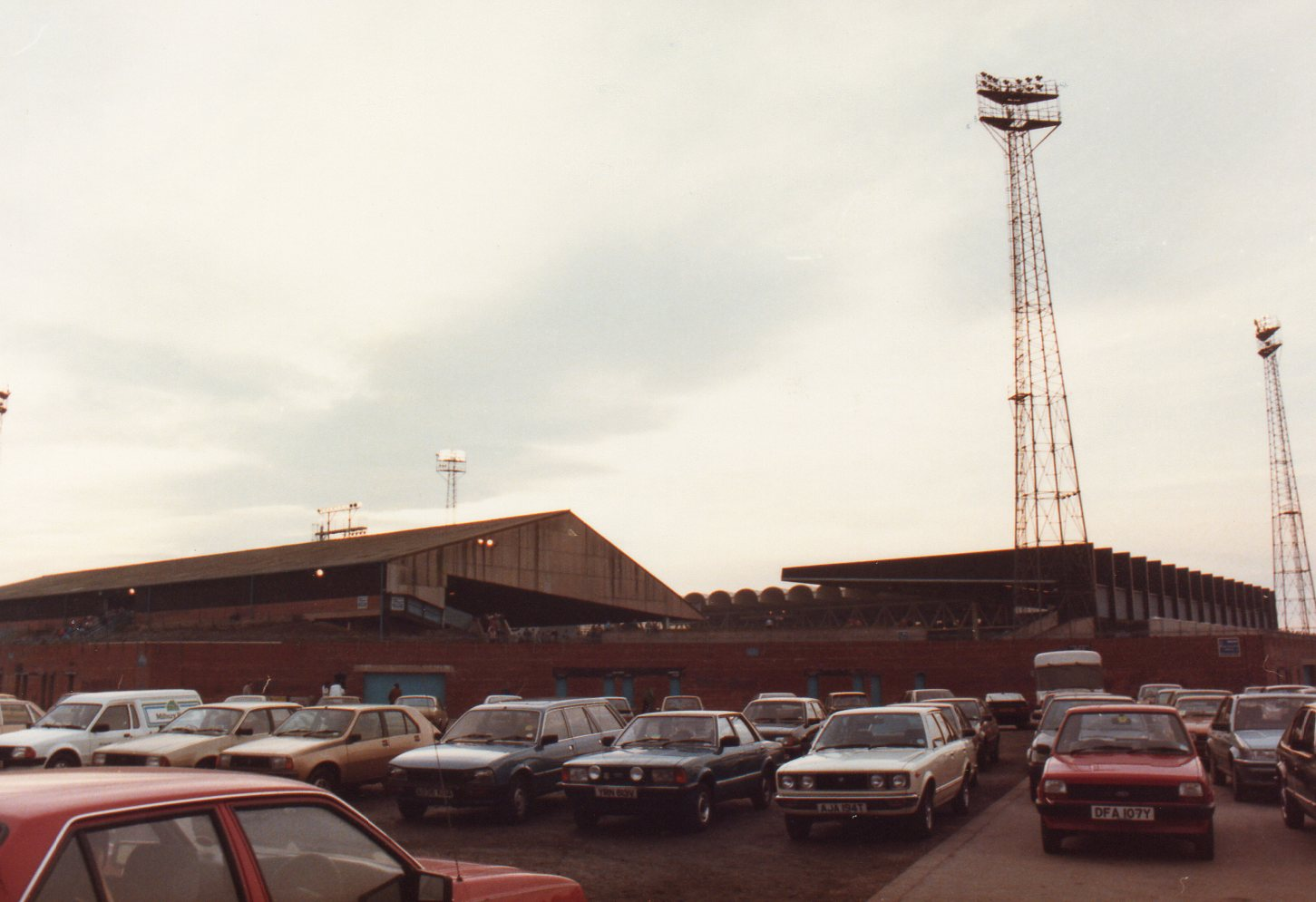
Facing the beloved Kippax stand in 1985

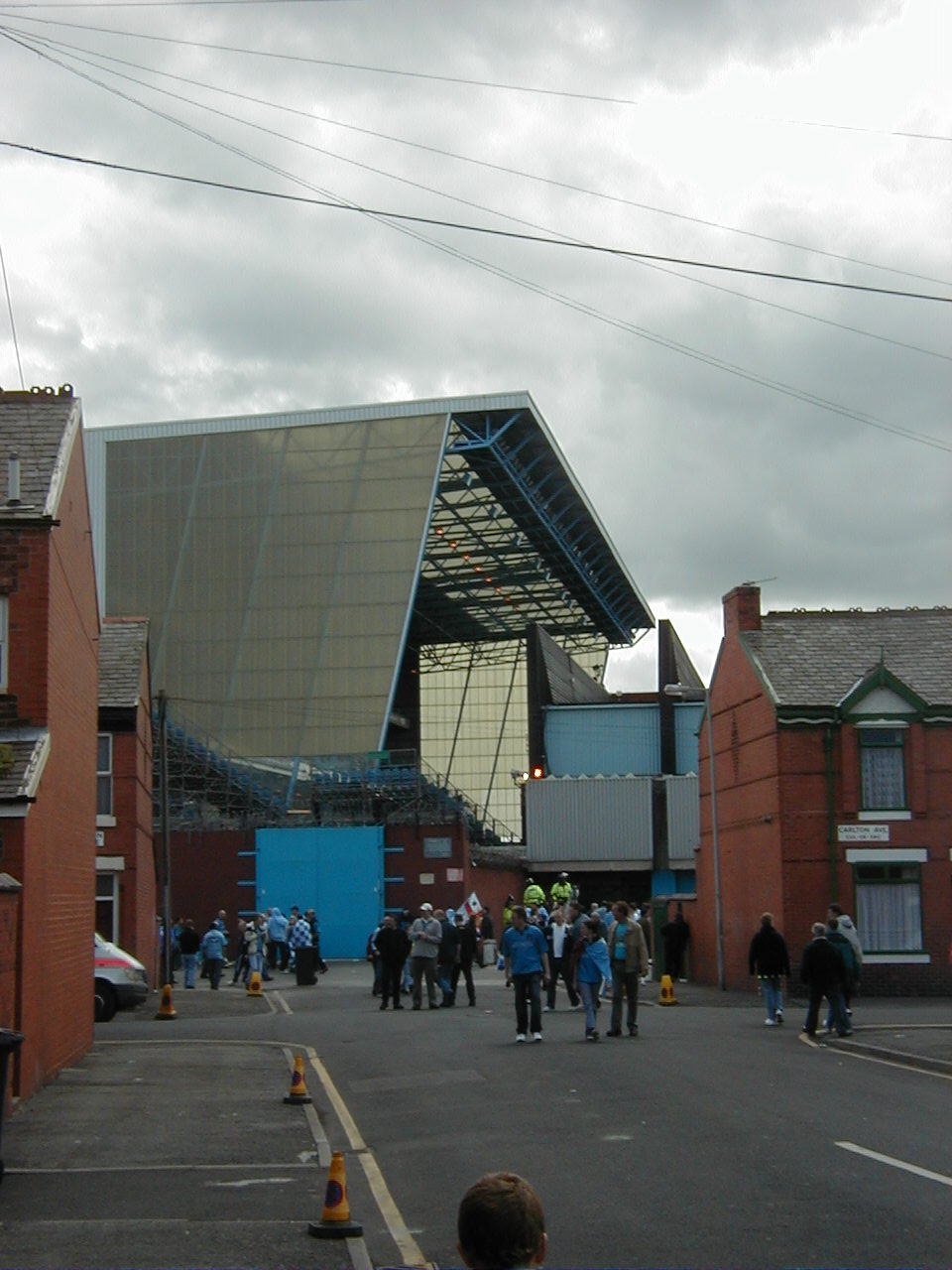
The new taller Kippax stand – "the ship that never sailed" in the eyes of one resident

1993–94 saw City's problems return as its league form slumped and the club finished 16th under new manager Brian Horton. Chairman Peter Swales buckled under pressure from fans and handed control of the club over to legendary former player Francis Lee. 1994–95 was hardly any better as a dismal second half of the season saw City finish 17th – two places above the drop zone. Horton was sacked just before the end of the season and replaced by Southampton manager Alan Ball. Ball set about trying to rebuild City and disposed of several older players who were no longer proving effective. He drafted in several promising young players, most notably the 22-year-old Georgian midfielder Giorgi Kinkladze. But a terrible start to the season condemned City to a relegation battle which was lost on the final day.

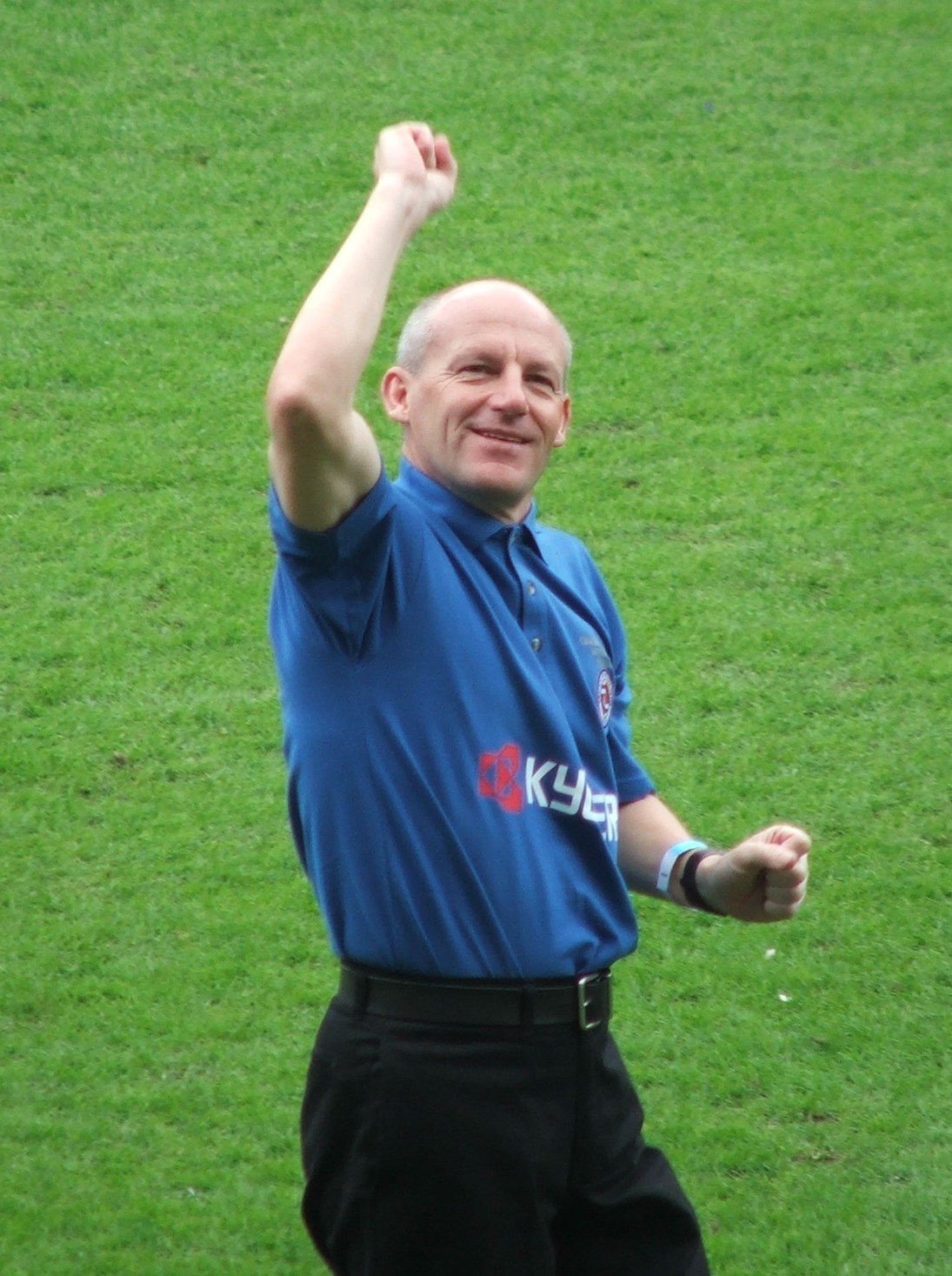
Steve Coppell, an enigma in English football, resigned as City boss after just 6 matches and 33 days becoming Manchester City's shortest serving manager in history

City also had to say farewell to the beloved "Kippax" stand in 1994 which had to be demolished in favour of a new stand. The era of standing accommodation at Maine Road came to an end in May 1994 as the stadium became all-seater to comply with the requirements of the Taylor Report with the demolition of the Kippax Street Terrace. The final match where standing was permitted took place on 30 April 1994, Chelsea the visitors for a 2–2 draw. Immediately prior to demolition the capacity of the Kippax terrace was 18,300. A three-tier stand was built in its place, holding nearly 14,000 spectators, and on its completion in October 1995 it was of the tallest stand in the country. It was not cheap either, at a cost of £16m in 1994, four times the turnover of the club as then-chairman Francis Lee later highlighted. The revamp of the Kippax was the second phase of a five-part development plan which would cost £40m and increase the stadium's capacity to 45,024, however the club abandoned these plans and attention was more aimed at the ongoings on the pitch as City continued their 90s slide down English football.

Ball was sacked soon after City's 1996–97 Division One campaign got underway, and his successor Steve Coppell resigned after just 6 matches in charge and 33 days as manager, claiming that the job was too much pressure for him. Phil Neal took over on a caretaker basis for 10 games however he lost 7 of these and by Christmas, City were in the bottom half of Division One and had turned to former Nottingham Forest manager Frank Clark to arrest the decline. City finished 14th in the final table.

But Clark was sacked the following February with City hovering in the bottom five of Division One. Former Oldham and Everton manager Joe Royle was drafted in to replace Clark, but a 5–2 away win over also-doomed Stoke on the final day of the season was not enough to save them from relegation because both Portsmouth and Port Vale won their games. City were now a Division Two side and had slipped into the third tier of the English league for the first time in their history – the first former winners of a European trophy to suffer this indignity along with Nottingham Forest and Leeds United in the following years.

== Recovery (1998–2001) ==
=== Darkest days – Division Two (1998–99) ===
After relegation, the club underwent some off-the-field upheaval, with new chairman David Bernstein taking over. City were promoted at the first attempt, albeit in typical dramatic fashion in a thrilling playoff final against Gillingham at Wembley featuring a late equalising goal by Paul Dickov to take the game to a penalty shoot-out which City won. Dickov's goal is arguably the most important in Manchester City's recent history, failure to get promoted in the first season of being in the third division of football might have impaled City to the lower depths of English football for a number of years.

In the 1999–2000 Division One campaign, City spent all season challenging for automatic promotion. They achieved it on the final day of the season by finishing runners-up in the division.

City's return to the Premiership saw them struggle and they were relegated after losing their penultimate game of the 2000–01 season – the first time that all of the Premiership's relegation places had been decided before the final game. Royle was sacked after the end of the season on 21 May 2001, however his sacking was not welcomed by many former City players and neither were many happy with chairman David Bernstein after Royle's future as manager was reassured regardless of relegation only weeks earlier. He was replaced by the former England manager Kevin Keegan as City fell back into the lower divisions again.

== See also ==
- Manchester City F.C. seasons
- Manchester City F.C. in Europe
- History of Manchester City F.C.
- History of Manchester City F.C. (1880–1928)
- History of Manchester City F.C. (1928–1965)
- History of Manchester City F.C. (2001–present)
