= History of Manchester City F.C. (1880–1928) =

History of an English football club

This page chronicles the history of Manchester City in further detail from its early years in 1880 to 1928. See Manchester City F.C. for an overview of the football club.

== Formation and early years (1875–1894) ==
=== St. Mark's beginnings (1880–1887) ===
As with many early football clubs the exact origin of Manchester City F.C. are not certain, having not been clearly documented at the time. The club can, however, trace its origins to St. Mark's Church in Gorton in the latter part of the 19th century. At the time, Gorton and indeed much of Manchester faced significant social problems, with large parts of the young male population regularly spending their free time "scuttling" - participating in semi-organised gang fights in open spaces involving hundreds of individuals at a time. The rector of St. Mark's - Arthur Connell - as well as his daughter Anna and church wardens William Beastow, Thomas Goodbehere and James Moores looked to refocus attentions on less destructive outlets with the forming of a young men's association in the 1870s. Among other activities, the members were encouraged to join the church's cricket team, though the cricket season only ran during the warmer months of the year. It is not clear from where or when the idea to form a football team which could play during the remainder of the year came, but their first recorded match was on 13 November 1880, against a church team from Macclesfield. St. Marks lost the match 2–1. Though their first few matches were largely unsuccessful they would record their first victory over Stalybridge Clarence in March 1881.

It is often popularly claimed that the football team which became Manchester City F.C. was created specifically by Anna Connell, which would make City perhaps the only major football club in the world with a female founder. Official club historian Gary James and several other authors dispute this, however, asserting that while Anna did take the lead on organising men's meetings and activities there is nothing specifically linking her to the football team. They comment that, all the same, she likely would have approved of the idea and could perhaps have been involved to some capacity.

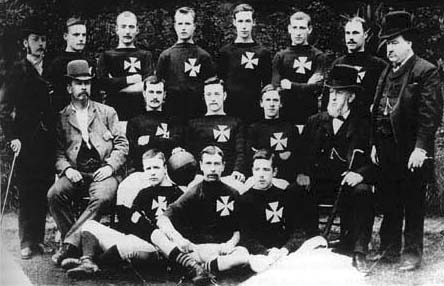
Gorton AFC in 1884 - the reason for the cross pattée is unknown to this day

In the early years of St Mark's' existence, several of their players had played for other teams while also turning out for the church side, among others being one of their first players, Walter Chew, a man who would continue to be associated with the club for the rest of his life, and who in 1884 was both captaining St Marks and also appearing for Belle Vue. When St Mark's lost their ground at the end of the 1883–84 season the links between the two teams, plus their proximity to each other, led to a merger with each other. It seemed that disagreements simmered between the players of the two teams however, as the union lasted only one season before the clubs split again, the St Mark's representatives naming themselves Gorton Association F.C. and Belle Vue reforming as West Gorton Athletic. With this name change, the team were gradually losing touch with their religious beginnings, and the St. Marks title slowly faded, with the club often placing St. Marks in parentheses.

Aside from being the first season of football under their new Gorton Association name, the 1884–85 season saw several other firsts for the former St Mark's team. Early in the season they joined the Manchester & District Football Association, and later played their first Manchester Senior Cup game under the competition's former name of Manchester & District Challenge Cup, the match ending up a First Round defeat by a 1–0 scoreline against university team Dalton Hall. It was also the first season for which the design of the shirts worn in matches is known for certain, with a now-well-known photo in existence showing the team wearing a black strip with a white cross pattée which has become symbolic to many fans and remains popular even though it has never been re-worn nor has its design influenced other kits in well over a century since it was first and last worn. Records exist suggesting that the club played in scarlet and black during its years merged with Belle Vue, and other references to colours exist, but no pictographic proof nor written description of the layout of colours worn exists for any of their previous kits.

Though the Gorton club had for several years been the contemporary and in some ways equal of other local clubs at the time, such as West Manchester, Heywood Central and the club which would evolve into their greatest rivals but then known as Newton Heath, in the previous couple of seasons those clubs had outpaced the Gortonians, making a name for themselves in the Manchester Senior Cup before stepping up to the level of the burgeoning national cup competition, the FA Cup. Gorton A.F.C. however continued to struggle in cup competitions, finally earning their first cup win with a 5–1 First Round victory over their former partners, West Gorton Athletic, in late 1886. Their joy was instantly cut short however, as they were given a Second Round tie against Newton Heath, with "the Heathens" showing the new disparity in strength with a ruthless 11-1 demolition of the Gorton club. Cup success was, however, to prove just around the corner for the old church team.

=== Ardwick A.F.C. (1887–1894) ===
The summer of 1887 turned out to be one of great change for the infant club, with change happening on three fronts. For a start, the club had once again been turfed out of their playing location and needed a new area to call their home. After some searching, one was eventually identified near to a railway viaduct in Ardwick. While the field initially was unimpressive, being uneven and muddy, either necessity or ambition finally won the day and a rent was agreed upon at a rate of £10 for seven months; club historian Gary James arguing that the disappointment of the previous five grounds instilled in the club's decision-makers a determination to go the extra distance this time to build a lasting stadium rather than continue to play on and be evicted from facility-less fields for the rest of their existence. The new location was close by the Hyde Road Hotel, and the club soon struck up a good relationship with the hotel's landlord, Stephen Chesters Thompson, who allowed them use of his hotel's facilities in exchange for the club officially basing themselves there, and later on receiving the licence to run all of the new stadium's bars. It was to be the start of a long link between the landlord and the club, and the businessman would work his way into the club's leadership before long. Another offshoot of the link with the Hyde Road Hotel was to be the club acquiring its first (recorded) nickname - they would continue to be known as The Brewerymen for some time. The first match at the brand new Hyde Road stadium was chosen to be against Salford A.F.C. on 10 September 1887, but the "grand opening" of the new ground was a non-event as Salford failed to turn up.

The second change to the club was to be to their name. No longer based within the limits of Gorton, it was decided that to continue to go by the name Gorton Association Football Club was now a misnomer. Consequently, the club officially renamed themselves Ardwick Association Football Club, inheriting the name of their new home district in place of the old. The final change related to their pay structure. While the club had officially been amateur since its creation, for the first time in 1887 it was decided to award one player a weekly salary of 5 shillings for his services, the club thereby becoming a professional organisation.

In 1889 an explosion at the nearby Hyde Road coal mine results in the death of 23 miners with Ardwick and Newton Heath, who both later became City and United, playing a friendly match under floodlights in aid of the disaster fund. The 1888–89 season was also to see the construction of the first stand at the new ground, though it held a capacity of only 1,000.

Deciding to take the biggest step yet in building a winning team, manager Lawrence Furniss and wealthy backer John Allison undertook a scouting trip to Scotland to search for players of a better level, who would push the team's on-pitch performance up another notch, ending with a return to England where they also looked at the squad of then-leading north-west side Bolton Wanderers. The trip was successful and several of the players they signed on would go on to be leading names for the club over the next few years, including goalkeeper William Douglas, David Robson and notable if temperamental England international David Weir.

Ardwick gained wider fame in 1891 by winning the Manchester Cup for the first time, defeating Newton Heath 1–0 in the final. This success proved influential to the decision by the Football Alliance to accept Ardwick as a member for the 1891–92 season. The Alliance merged with the Football League in 1892, and Ardwick became founder members of Division Two. Financial troubles in the 1893–94 season led to a reorganisation within the club, and Ardwick turned into Manchester City, with Manchester City Football Club Limited formally becoming a registered company on 16 April 1894.

== Manchester City Football Club (1894) ==
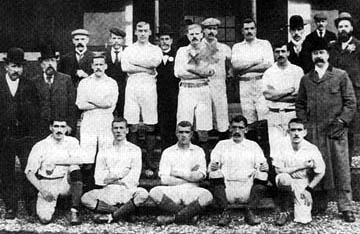
The 1898-99 team that promoted to the first division

In 1894 the club was reformed and manager Joshua Parlby acquired nineteen-year-old Billy Meredith from Northwich Victoria. The future "Welsh Wizard" was extremely talented and won his first international cap for Wales in 1895. However, he continued to work underground as a miner during the week until 1896, when Manchester City finally insisted that he give up his colliery job.

=== Growth (1894–1898) ===
The club was growing at a rapid pace and in 1895, within a year of the club's inception, the club started to attract crowds of over 20,000 with the biggest attendance of 30,000 for a Good Friday fixture in 1895. The Manchester City supporters of this time were known to be exuberant fans of their club, often transferring their enthusiasm for the club into creating a loud atmosphere at Hyde Road, often with their bugles and drums whilst some would occasionally wear fancy dress.

On the pitch, the team went from strength to strength and the support given to the club vitalised industrial east Manchester, something the club's original founder Arthur Connell strived to do.

=== Promotion to top tier (1899) ===
Winning the Second Division in 1899 gave the club its first honours and promotion to highest level in English football, the First Division.

== First Manchester team to win a trophy - FA Cup champions and League runners-up (1904) ==
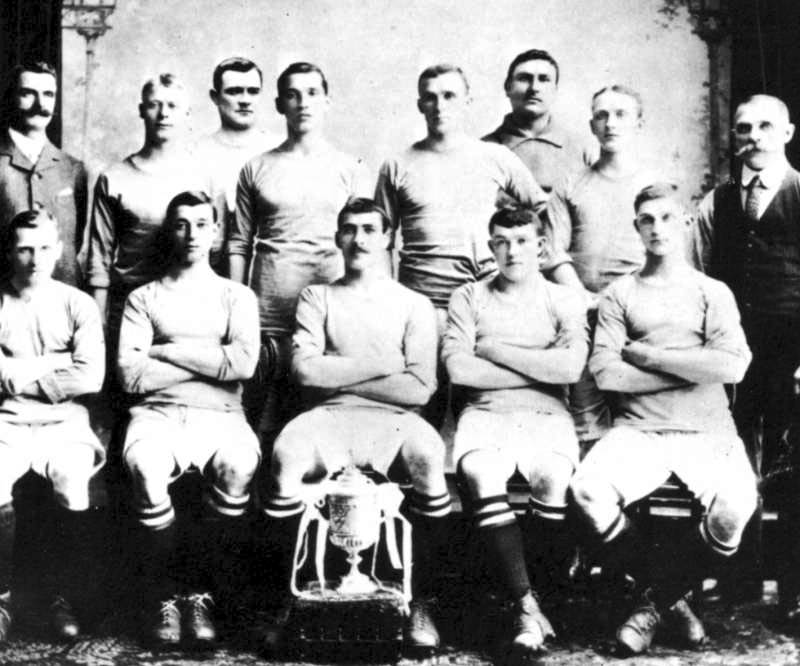
The Manchester City team which won the FA Cup in 1904

The club went on to claim its first major honour on 23 April 1904, beating Bolton Wanderers 1–0 at Crystal Palace to win the most prestigious knockout tournament in English football, the FA Cup, and narrowly missing out on a League and Cup double by finishing runners-up in the League.

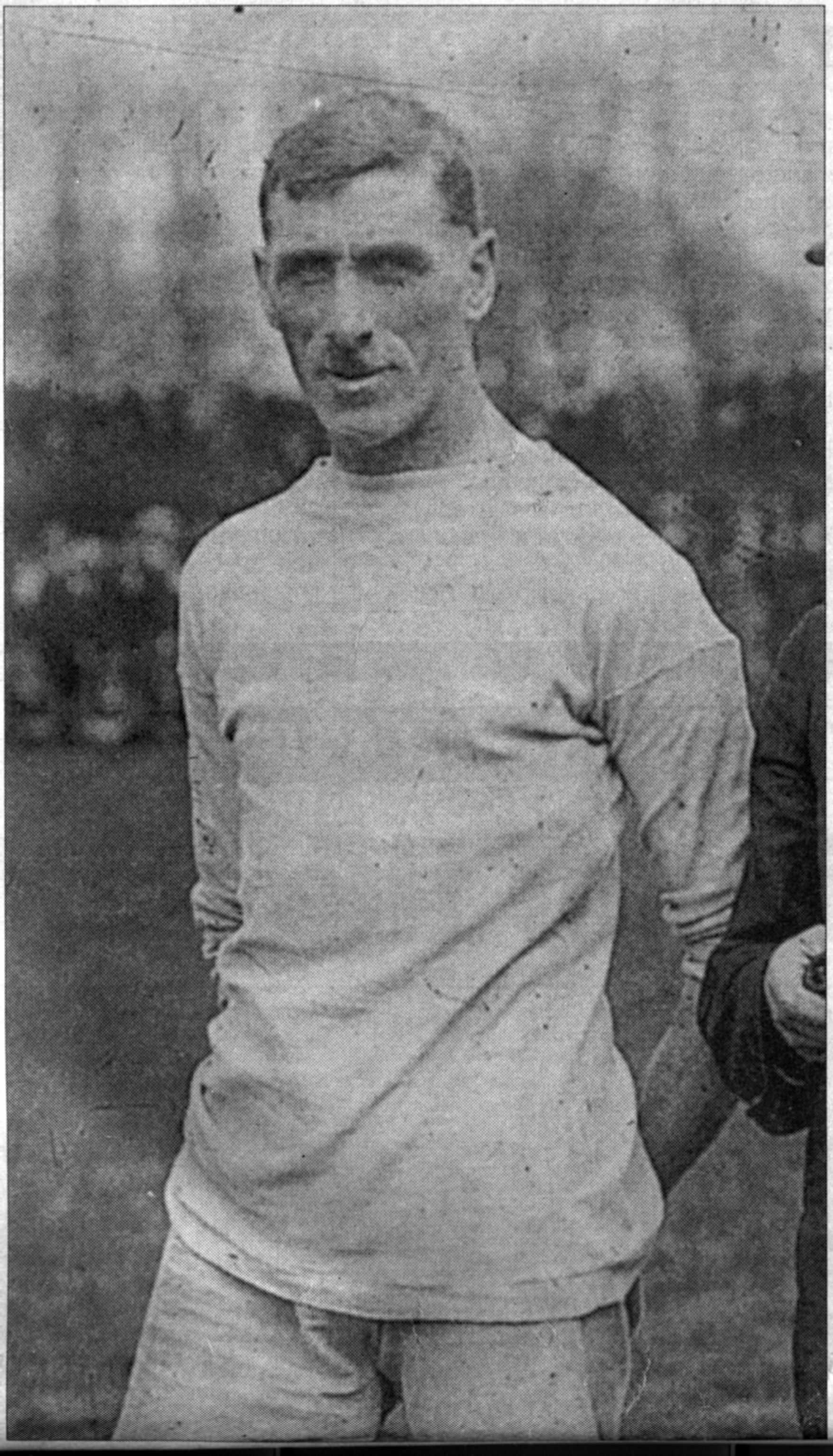
The "Welsh Wizard" - Meredith played as an outside forward who played 367 times and scored 128 goals for City in two spells at the club

=== Abrupt end to early success with corruption allegations (1904–05) ===
In the 1904–05 season Manchester City were level on points with Newcastle United in the league and needed to beat Aston Villa on the final day of the season to seal the First Division championship. Villa won the game 3–2 at Villa Park and City finished third overall in the league, two points behind eventual champions Newcastle United. After the game Alec Leake, the captain of Aston Villa, claimed that Billy Meredith had offered him £10 to throw the game.

Meredith was found guilty of this offence by the Football Association and was fined and suspended from playing football for a year. Whilst Manchester City refused to provide financial help for Meredith and so he decided to go public about claimed that City were breaking the rules: "What was the secret of the success of the Manchester City team? In my opinion, the fact that the club put aside the rule that no player should receive more than four pounds a week ... The team delivered the goods, the club paid for the goods delivered and both sides were satisfied." This statement roused suspicion as the Football League had imposed a £4 a week cap on wages on all clubs in 1901, whereas Meredith alleged publicly that City broke this rule.

The Football Association now carried out a thorough investigation into the financial activities of Manchester City and they came to the conclusion that City had been making additional payments to all their players. Tom Maley, the manager, was suspended from football for life and City was fined £250. Seventeen players were fined and suspended until January 1907 whilst City were forced to sell their players and at an auction at the Queen's Hotel in Manchester. The Manchester United manager, Ernest Mangnall signed the outstandingly gifted, Billy Meredith for only £500. Mangnall also purchased three other talented members of the City side, Herbert Burgess, Sandy Turnbull and Jimmy Bannister. These former City players became the core of the side that won the Football League championship in the 1907–08 season.

Journalists were aware that most clubs in the Football League was making illegitimate payments to its players. Football writers based in Manchester argued that the club, being a northern side, were being made an example of, and thousands of people complained to the Football Association, who refused to reduce the bans and fines. Nevertheless, the unfair ban in some eyes brought a young and very potentially a successful team to an abrupt halt, although the whistle-blower Meredith did return to City later on in his career.

=== Move from Hyde Road to Maine Road (1923) ===
In 1920, the ground became the first football venue outside London to be visited by a reigning monarch; King George V attended the ground to watch a match between Manchester City and Liverpool. In November a fire caused by a cigarette end destroyed the Main Stand, and Manchester City began to seek a new home. Initial discussions raised the possibility of sharing Old Trafford with neighbours Manchester United, but United's proposed rent was prohibitive, so repair work was undertaken and Manchester City continued to play at Hyde Road.

Plans for the club to move to a new ground—Maine Road—in Moss Side were announced in 1922. The final Manchester City match at Hyde Road was a league fixture against Newcastle United on 28 April 1923, and in August 1923 a public practice game was the last football match played at Hyde Road. Manchester City began the 1923–24 season at Maine Road, which had an 80,000 capacity.

The plans to move away from east Manchester to south Manchester in Moss Side upset some, and John Ayrton, a Manchester City director split from the club and founded Manchester Central F.C. feeling the city needed a team from east Manchester.

Parts of Hyde Road were used elsewhere; the roof of the Main Stand was sold to Halifax Town, and erected at The Shay, where even in the 21st century, part of the Hyde Road roof is still in place. Within a decade of its demolition, all traces of the football ground had disappeared from Hyde Road. As of 2008, the site of the pitch is a bus depot, where training exercises for drivers take place.

=== 31 goals in 5 matches en route to FA Cup Final and lose (1926) ===
The club reached the 1926 FA Cup Final, scoring 31 goals in 5 matches en route to the final. However the form to the final counted for nothing as City were beaten 1–0 by Bolton Wanderers. Further disappointment followed in the league, when after a campaign characterised by erratic form, City were relegated on the final day of the season.

The following 1926/27 season featured a close fought battle for promotion as the club sought an immediate return to the top division. The race for promotion went to the final match, with Manchester City and Portsmouth both in contention for the second of two promotion places. Manchester City's final match was a resounding 8–0 win against Bradford City. The watching crowd believed the result to be sufficient for promotion, but Portsmouth's match had been delayed by 15 minutes and was still in progress. A late Portsmouth goal meant the final scoreline in their match was a 5–1 win, enough to give Portsmouth second place on goal average by a margin of one two-hundredth of a goal.

The club won the Second Division championship in the 1927/28 following season, gaining promotion to the top flight.

== See also ==
- History of Manchester City F.C.
- History of Manchester City F.C. (1928–1965)
- History of Manchester City F.C. (1965–2001)
- History of Manchester City F.C. (2001–present)
