= History of Manchester City F.C. (1928–1965) =

History of an English football club

This page chronicles the history of Manchester City in further detail from 1928 to 1965. See Manchester City F.C. for an overview of the football club.

== Back in top flight (1928–29) ==
The club then consolidated their top flight status with an eighth-place finish. The season also saw Tommy Johnson set a club record by scoring 38 goals.

== Cup winners, champions then relegation (1930s) ==
=== 1930s team ===
In the 1930s Manchester City began to challenge for honours, regularly challenging for the prestigious FA Cup on numerous occasions.

The team of the 1930s featured players such as Matt Busby, who would later go on to manage Manchester United, Frank Swift with a finger span of 12 inches, who is still regarded as one of the best goalkeepers of all time, and who was only prevented from playing more for England by the hiatus caused by World War II. The team also included striker Fred Tilson and captain Sam Cowan. Cowan introduced Tilson to King George VI before the 1934 FA Cup final saying, "This is Tilson, your Majesty. He's playing today with two broken legs."

=== Third-place finish and FA Cup semi-final (1932) ===
The club finished third in the league in 1929/30. In November 1931 they were 15th in the table when they signed Dave Halliday who made an immediate impact. His goals took them up to finish 15th in the league. From 1931/32 they became a formidable FA Cup side as the only team to reach the semi-finals in all of the next three seasons. In the 1932 FA Cup semi final they lost out to last minute Cliff Bastin goal for Herbert Chapman's Arsenal. In 31/32 Halliday was City's top scorer in league and cup.

=== FA Cup runners-up – Cowan: "We'll win it next year" (1933) ===
In the early 1930s, Cowan became Manchester City captain, succeeding Jimmy McMullan. During his captaincy the club reached two further FA Cup finals. The first of these was in 1933, against Everton. During the match Cowan was up against Everton captain Dixie Dean. Both players were renowned for their heading ability. Matt Busby claimed that Cowan could "head a ball as far as most of us could kick it", but Dean prevailed in the aerial battle, scoring Everton's second goal with a header. The Daily Mail observed that Dean's presence gave Cowan a dilemma: "He was torn between a determination not to leave Dean and a desire to help his forwards. He broke down between the two." Everton were 3–0 victors, but when Cowan received his runner's up medal from the Duke of York, he remarked that he would come back next year to win. True to Cowan's word, City returned to Wembley the following year.

=== Finally FA Cup victory – Cowan fulfils his promise (1934) ===
FA Cup record, 1932–38

Year	Round
1932	Semi-finalist
1933	Runners-up
1934	Champions
1935	Third round
1936	Fifth round
1937	Quarter-finalist
1938	Quarter-finalist

City were gaining a reputation as FA Cup specialists of recent years and in 1934 during another cup run, 84,559 exuberant packed Maine Road to see City play Stoke City in the quarter-final, an attendance record which still stands to this day. In the 1934 FA Cup Final, Cowan became the first and thus far only Manchester City player to represent the club in three FA Cup finals. He captained City to a 2–1 victory over Portsmouth. As team captain Cowan held primary responsibility for motivating his fellow players and match tactics. This was typical for a captain of his era, as managers of the period were chiefly administrators who had little input into coaching and tactics.

The season after the FA Cup triumph, the club finished fourth in the league in the 1934–35 season and failed to build on their good FA Cup record of late losing 1–0 to Tottenham in the third round. In the following 1935–36 season City struggled finishing ninth in the league, however this proved to be the penultimate season that Manchester City would not have the honour of First Division champions.

=== Champions finally (1937) ===
City finally claimed their maiden First Division title in 1937 after being runners-up twice in 1903–04 and in 1920–21 and third-place finished thrice in 1904–05, 1907–08 and 1929–30. City strolled to victory as they scored over 100 goals, the only team to do so during the season and were unbeaten for 22 matches in the league.

=== Reigning champions relegated (1938) ===
However they were relegated the following season, despite scoring more goals than any other team in the division. This event has been attributed to typical City syndrome and City remain the only reigning champions to be relegated in English football.

=== War hiatus (1939–1945) ===
After a season in the Second Division, play was suspended due to the onset of World War II. During this six-year period, a Wartime League was introduced, however this was set up as sporting entertainment aimed at providing morale to the ordinary people in towns and cities across England. Some players chose to play for City during the war and some played as guests for other teams such as Frank Swift, whilst others like Jackie Bray joined the Royal Air Force in 1940 to help the war efforts and was awarded a British Empire Medal for his endeavours during the war.

== Post war (1946–1964) ==
=== Former captain Cowan takes over and gains promotion (1946–47) ===
When play resumed after the war, Cowan became Manchester City manager in November 1946, succeeding Wilf Wild, who moved to a purely administrative role. Cowan had been known for his motivational skills as a player, and was part of a new generation of managers who took responsibility for tactics and team selection, of which Cowan's contemporary and former defensive teammate at City Matt Busby became the most well-known.

Cowan was given a salary of £2,000, and came to an agreement whereby he spent part of the week with the Manchester City team and part looking after his business interests in Brighton. His first match as manager was a 3–0 win against Newport County, and the team then embarked upon a run of 19 matches without defeat. Despite achieving the division Two title in his first season in charge, Cowan resigned in June 1947 as his commute from Brighton caused tension with club officials. His resignation was perhaps unfortunate, despite City having a post-war squad far capable of being in the second tier of English football, as former captain he impressed as a young manager and as of 2010 has the highest win percentage of any City manager in history.

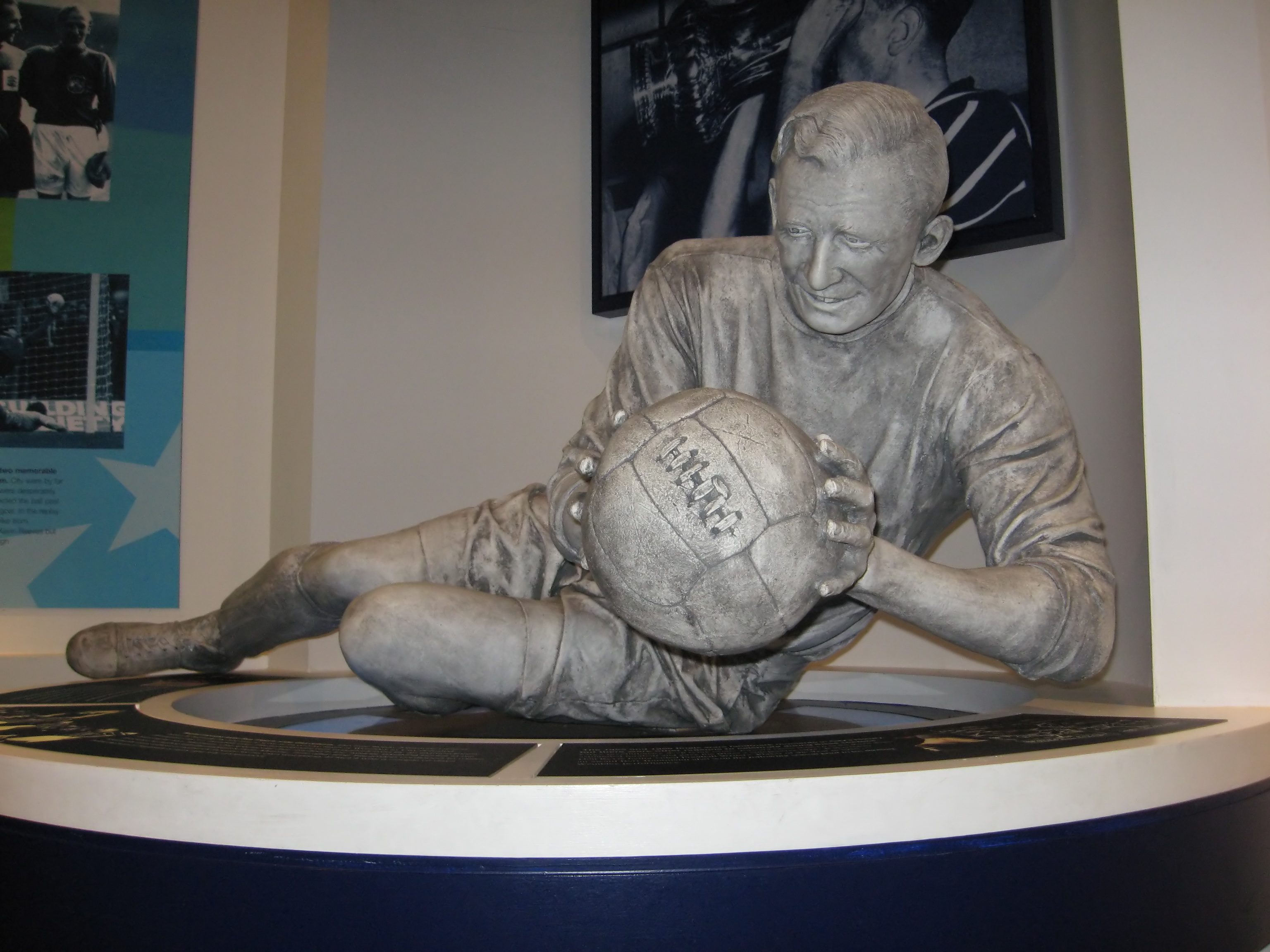
Former German paratrooper Bert Trautmann – initially despised in Britain but soon entered gained huge popularity with his brave saves which resulted a broken neck in the 1956 FA Cup Final, somehow Trautmann managed to play the last 15 minutes of the match

There have only been two world-class goalkeepers. One was Lev Yashin, the other was the German boy who played in Manchester – Trautmann.

— Lev Yashin

=== Bert Trautmann (1949–1964) ===
The club courted controversy in 1949 by signing German goalkeeper Bert Trautmann as a replacement for England international Frank Swift, who had retired. Trautmann's story with Manchester City and importantly the English supporters was soon inscribed in English football folklore and it is hard to think of a footballer who has been on such a life journey.

Previously being a Nazi paratrooper Trautmann admitted during and prior the war he saw the British and Jews as enemies, however it was when he taken as a prisoner of war in England that he quickly reappraised his view of both. He was astonished at his treatment as a POW, after being invited for Christmas dinner, an unthinkable luxury in an brainwashing, dictatorial Nazi Germany. Trautmann soon warmed to England that he decided to settle in the country upon repatriation in Lancashire and even changed his name from the hard to pronounce Bernhard to a more English Bert. Having taken an interest in sport, he soon played for St Helens Town and humbled when Manchester City signed him in 1949.

The signing sparked protests; 20,000 people attended a demonstration. Furthermore, there was pressure on Trautmann himself as he had to replace Frank Swift, still regarded as one of the greatest goalkeepers of all time as well as one of the most popular with his genial, gentlemanly manner. He also gained support from a Jewish rabbi who said "not only one man can be convicted representative for one country" and Trautmann should not be prejudged.

his dissenters soon changed their tone with his performances, in an often struggling Manchester City when he first joined. His willingness to claim a loose ball often at the peril of an oncoming opponent at full speed was noted by supporters, not only City supporters. It was this technique that gave him a broken neck in the 1956 FA Cup Final and had to play the last 15 minutes as no substitutes were left. Regardless of this event, Trautmann was already a well-known figure in English football and by the end of career with City he was regarded by some as one of the leading goalkeepers of his era with 47,000 people attending his testimonial, with estimates at closer to 60,000.

== Cup success (1955–56) ==
Record 1948–1960 – Inconsistent years
Season	League									FA Cup	Top scorer^{[A]}	
Season	Division	P	W	D	L	F	A	Pts	Pos	FA Cup	Player	Goals
1948–49	Div 1	42	15	15	12	47	51	45	7th	R3	George Smith	13
1949–50	Div 1	42	8	13	21	36	68	29	21st	R3	Roy Clarke	10
1950–51	Div 2	42	19	14	9	89	61	52	2nd	R3	Dennis Westcott	26
1951–52	Div 1	42	13	13	16	58	61	39	15th	R3	Johnny Hart; Dennis Westcott	11
1952–53	Div 1	42	14	7	21	72	87	35	20th	R4	Billy Spurdle; Johnny Williamson	12
1953–54	Div 1	42	14	9	19	62	77	37	17th	R4	Don Revie	13
1954–55	Div 1	42	18	10	14	76	69	46	7th	RU	Johnny Hart; Joe Hayes	15
1955–56	Div 1	42	18	10	14	82	69	46	4th	W	Joe Hayes	27
1956–57	Div 1	42	13	9	20	78	88	35	18th	R3	Bobby Johnstone	19
1957–58	Div 1	42	22	5	15	104	100	49	5th	R3	Joe Hayes	26
1958–59	Div 1	42	11	9	22	64	95	31	20th	R3	Colin Barlow	18
1959–60	Div 1	42	17	3	22	78	84	37	16th	R3	Billy McAdams	22

In the 1950s, a City team inspired by a tactical system known as the Revie Plan reached consecutive FA Cup finals for the second time in its history, and just as in the 1930s.

=== 1955 FA Cup Final ===
The 1955 FA Cup Final was contested by Newcastle United and Manchester City at Wembley. Newcastle won 3–1, with goals from Jackie Milburn in the first minute (after 45 seconds, a record in a final at Wembley, a record he held until 1997), Bobby Mitchell and George Hannah. Bobby Johnstone scored City's goal. The game was virtually decided when Man City fullback Meadows was turned inside out by the elusive and mercurial Bobby Mitchell and after 22 minutes was stretchered off with a bad leg injury and City were down to 10 men as no substitutes were permitted in the 1950s. Whilst City's much-vaunted Revie Plan (based on a deep-lying centre-forward in Don Revie) failed to fire.

=== 1956 FA Cup Final ===
The 1956 final, in which Manchester City beat Birmingham City 3–1, is one of the most famous finals of all-time, and is remembered for City goalkeeper Bert Trautmann continuing to play after breaking his neck.

Both teams employed the formation typical of the era: two full-backs, a centre-half, two wing-halves, two outside-forwards, two inside-forwards and a centre-forward. However, their tactical approaches differed. Birmingham, described by The Times as using "iron determination, powerful tackling and open direct methods", employed the traditional English approach of getting the ball to the outside-forwards as quickly as possible, whereas Manchester City adopted tactics inspired by the Hungarian team which had soundly beaten England at Wembley three years before. The system involved using Don Revie in a deeper position than a traditional centre-forward in order to draw a defender out of position, and was therefore known as the "Revie Plan". As both teams' first-choice colours were blue, each team wore their change strip to prevent confusion. Manchester City therefore wore maroon, and Birmingham City wore white.

City reached the FA Cup Final at Wembley in consecutive years in 1955 and 1956 – the second time they have done so in their history

Birmingham won the toss and Manchester City kicked off. The Birmingham goal came under pressure almost immediately. Within a minute a far post cross from Roy Clarke narrowly eluded Hayes. Two corners followed, the second resulting in a shot by Roy Paul. The next attack, in the third minute, resulted in the opening goal. Revie began the move, exchanging passes with Clarke, and back-heeling for the unmarked Hayes to sweep the ball past Gil Merrick to put Manchester City ahead. Birmingham's confidence was shaken, resulting in a series of Manchester City corners and a chance for Hayes, but they fought back to equalise in the 15th minute. Astall slipped the ball to Brown, who helped it forward. It rebounded off a Manchester City defender into the path of Welsh international inside‑forward Noel Kinsey, who fired home via Trautmann's far post. For the remainder of the first half Birmingham had most of the play, exerting pressure on Manchester City full-back Leivers, but were unable to make a breakthrough. Though Birmingham put the ball in the net twice, Brown was adjudged to be offside on both occasions. With Warhurst missing and Boyd out of position and not fully fit, Birmingham's strength and balance was disrupted, leaving them particularly vulnerable to Manchester City's unconventional style.

During the half-time interval, a row erupted between the Birmingham manager and some of his players about their fitness; in the Manchester City dressing room, a heated exchange took place between Barnes and Revie. Barnes had played defensively in the first half to counter the threat of Peter Murphy, but Revie urged him to play further forward. Meanwhile, manager Les McDowall exhorted his players to keep possession and make their opponents chase the ball.

The period immediately after half‑time saw few chances, but then, after just over an hour's play, Manchester City regained their stride and suddenly went two goals ahead. A throw-in to Revie led to interplay on the right wing involving Barnes, Dyson, and Johnstone, resulting in a through-ball which put Dyson clear of the defence to score. Two minutes later, Trautmann collected the ball at the end of a Birmingham attack and kicked the ball long to Dyson, over the heads of the retreating Birmingham players. Dyson flicked the ball on to Bobby Johnstone, who scored Manchester City's third, becoming the first player ever to score in consecutive Wembley finals in the process.

With 17 minutes remaining, a Birmingham chance arose when Murphy outpaced Dave Ewing. Goalkeeper Trautmann dived at the feet of Murphy to win the ball, but in the collision Murphy's right knee hit Trautmann's neck with a forceful blow. Trautmann was knocked unconscious, and the referee stopped play immediately. Trainer Laurie Barnett rushed onto the pitch, and treatment continued for several minutes. No substitutes were permitted, so Manchester City would have to see out the game with ten men if Trautmann was unable to continue. Captain Roy Paul felt certain that Trautmann was not fit to complete the match, and wished to put Roy Little in goal instead. However, Trautmann, dazed and unsteady on his feet, insisted upon keeping his goal. He played out the remaining minutes in great pain, with the Manchester City defenders attempting to clear the ball well upfield or into the stand whenever it came near. Trautmann was called upon to make two further saves to deny Brown and Murphy, the second causing him to recoil in agony due to a collision with Ewing, which required the trainer to revive him.

No further goals were scored, and the referee blew for full-time with the final score 3–1 to Manchester City. As the players left the field, the crowd sang a chorus of "For he's a jolly good fellow" in tribute to Trautmann's bravery. Roy Paul led his team up the steps to the royal box to receive Manchester City's third FA Cup. Trautmann's neck continued to cause him pain, and Prince Philip commented on its crooked state as he gave Trautmann his winner's medal. Three days later, an examination revealed that Trautmann had broken a bone in his neck.

== See also ==
- History of Manchester City F.C.
- History of Manchester City F.C. (1880–1928)
- History of Manchester City F.C. (1965–2001)
- History of Manchester City F.C. (2001–present)
