= The Kippax =

Stand at Marine Road football ground

Coordinates: 53°27′05″N 2°14′03″W

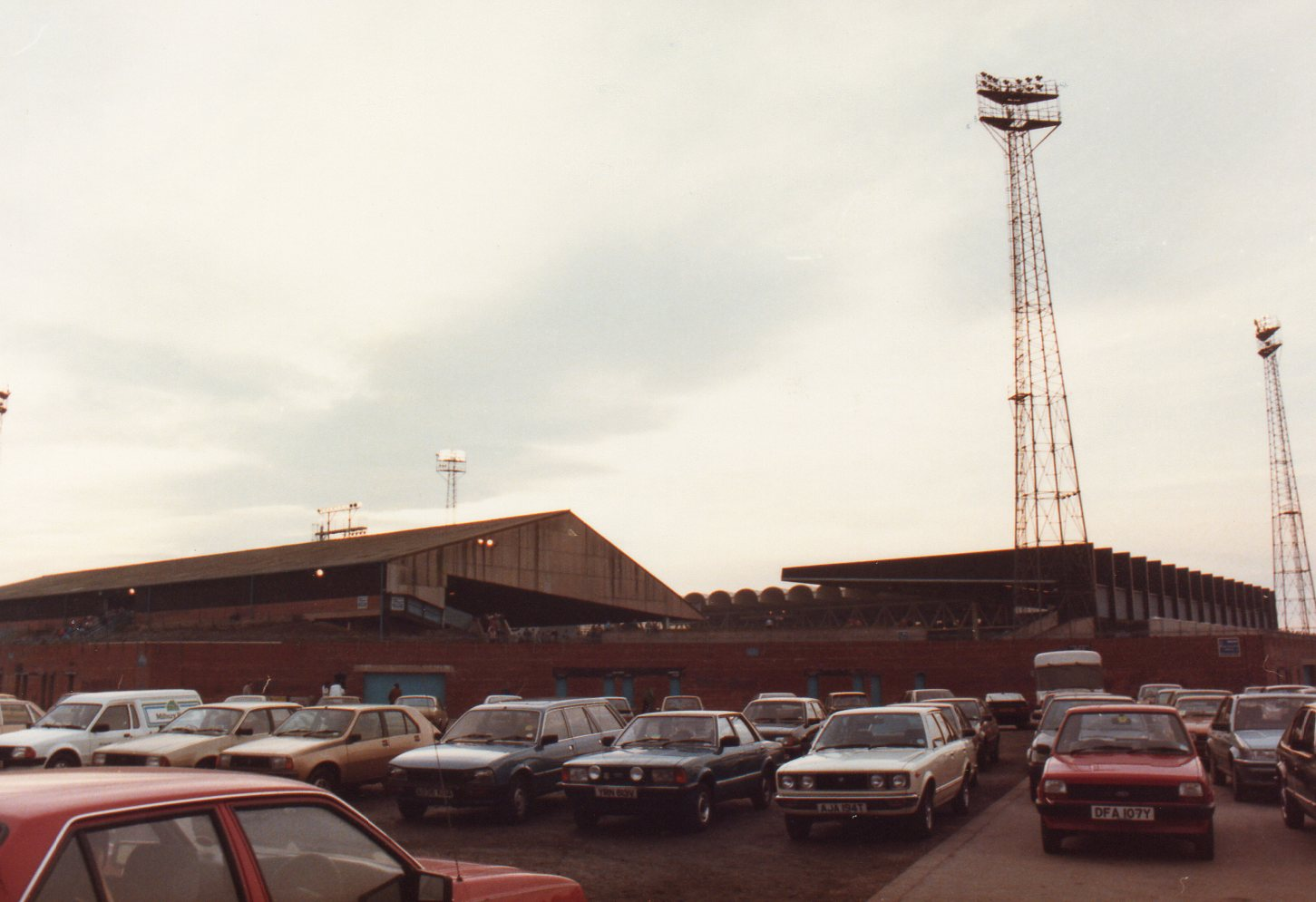
Facing the Kippax stand in 1985

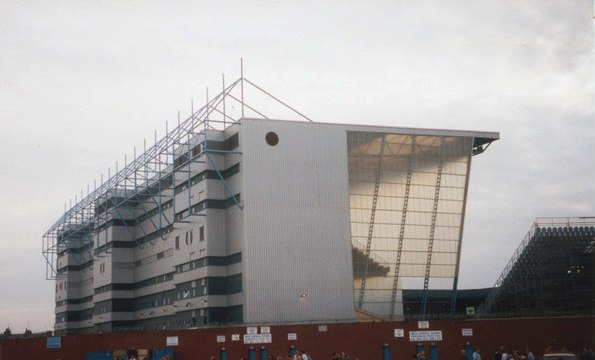
The new Kippax built in 1994

The Kippax was a terraced stand at Manchester City's Maine Road ground in Manchester, England. Originally the Popular Side when the stadium opened in 1923, its name was changed in 1956 when the club built a roof over it, after Kippax Street which ran along the side of the ground (named in turn for the town of Kippax, West Yorkshire). The Kippax was unusual in being a terrace which ran the length of one side of the pitch rather than behind one of the goals.

In the summer of 1994, due to the Taylor Report on the Hillsborough disaster, the Kippax was demolished and a new all seater stand built in its place. This new stand was completed in stages over the course of eighteen months and was finally opened by City legend Bert Trautmann in October 1995. It housed 10,178 seated fans, had three tiers and was at the time the highest stand in the country.

The club left Maine Road in May 2003 and relocated to the City of Manchester Stadium. Maine Road was demolished in early 2004. Unofficially, the East Stand at the new stadium is also called The Kippax.
