= History of Manchester City F.C. =

History of an English football club

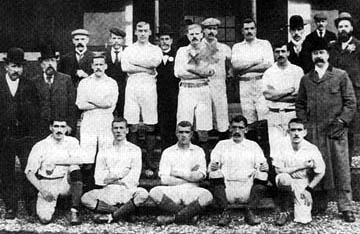
The 1898–99 team that gained promotion to the First Division.

The history of Manchester City Football Club, a professional football club based in Manchester, England, dates back to the club's formation in 1880 by members of St. Mark's Church of England in West Gorton.

Manchester City have won thirty-eight major honours throughout their history: ten league titles, eight FA Cups, nine League Cups, seven FA Charity/Community Shields, one UEFA Champions League, one European Cup Winners' Cup, one UEFA Super Cup and one FIFA World Club Cup.

== 1880–1928 ==
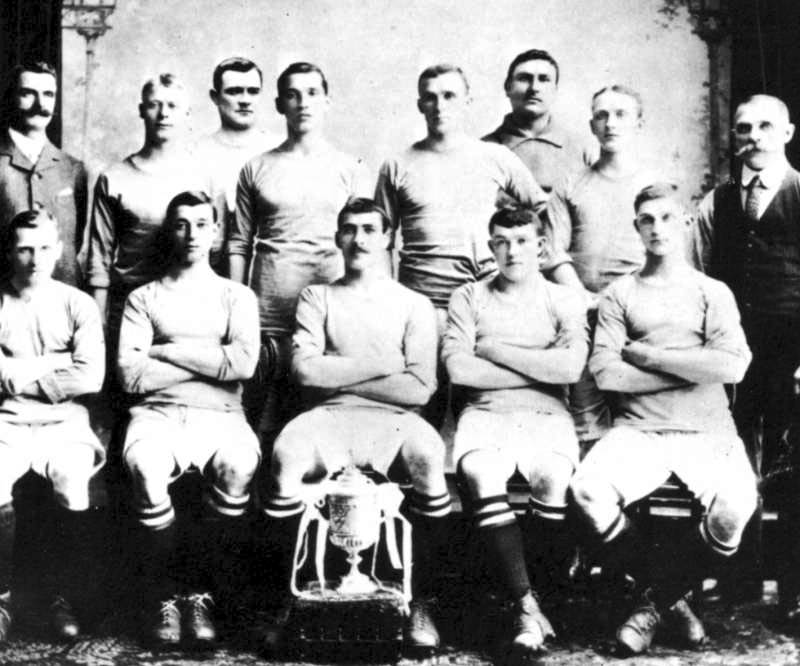
The Manchester City team which won the FA Cup in 1904.

Members of St. Mark's Church of England, West Gorton, Manchester, founded the football club that would become known as Manchester City for largely humanitarian purposes. Two church wardens sought to curb local gang violence and alcoholism by instituting new activities for local men, whilst high unemployment plagued East Manchester, specifically Gorton. All men were welcome to join, regardless of religion.

A church cricket club had been formed in 1875, but no equivalent for the winter months existed. To rectify this, and as part of Rector Arthur Connell's general push to intervene in social ills, church wardens William Beastow and Thomas Goodbehere, who held senior positions at the Union Iron Works, started a church football team called St Mark's (West Gorton), sometimes written as West Gorton (St Mark's), in the winter of 1880.

The team's first recorded match occurred on 13 November 1880, against a church team from Macclesfield. St. Marks lost the match 2–1, and only won one match during their inaugural 1880–81 season, with a victory over Stalybridge Clarence in March 1881.

City gained their first honours by winning the Second Division in 1899; with it came promotion to the highest level in English football, the First Division. They went on to claim their first major honour on 23 April 1904, beating Bolton Wanderers 1–0 at Crystal Palace to win the FA Cup; City narrowly missed out on a League and Cup double that season after finishing runners-up in the League but City became the first club in Manchester to win a major honour. In the seasons following the FA Cup triumph, the club was dogged by allegations of financial irregularities, culminating in the suspension of seventeen players in 1906, including captain Billy Meredith, who subsequently moved across town to Manchester United. A fire at Hyde Road destroyed the main stand in 1920, and in 1923 the club moved to their new purpose-built stadium at Maine Road in Moss Side.

== 1928–1965 ==
In the 1930s, Manchester City reached two consecutive FA Cup finals, losing to Everton in 1933, before claiming the Cup by beating Portsmouth in 1934. During the 1934 cup run, Manchester City broke the record for the highest home attendance of any club in English football history, as 84,569 fans packed Maine Road for a sixth round FA Cup tie against Stoke City in 1934—a record which still stands to this day. The club won the First Division title for the first time in 1937, but were relegated the following season, despite scoring more goals than any other team in the division. Twenty years later, a City team inspired by a tactical system known as the Revie Plan reached consecutive FA Cup finals again, in 1955 and 1956; just as in the 1930s, they lost the first one, to Newcastle United, and won the second. The 1956 final, in which Manchester City beat Birmingham City 3–1, is one of the most famous finals of all-time, and is remembered for City goalkeeper Bert Trautmann continuing to play on after unknowingly breaking his neck.

== 1965–2001 ==
After relegation to the Second Division in 1963, the future looked bleak with a record low home attendance of 8,015 against Swindon Town in January 1965. In the summer of 1965, the management team of Joe Mercer and Malcolm Allison was appointed. In the first season under Mercer, City won the Second Division title and made important signings in Mike Summerbee and Colin Bell. Two seasons later, in 1967–68, Manchester City claimed the League Championship for the second time, clinching the title on the final day of the season with a 4–3 win at Newcastle United and beating their close neighbours Manchester United into second place. Further trophies followed: City won the FA Cup in 1969, before achieving European success by winning the European Cup Winners' Cup in 1970, beating Górnik Zabrze 2–1 in Vienna. City also won the League Cup that season, becoming the second English team to win a European trophy and a domestic trophy in the same season.

The club continued to challenge for honours throughout the 1970s, finishing one point behind the league champions on two occasions and reaching the final of the 1974 League Cup. One of the matches from this period that is most fondly remembered by supporters of Manchester City is the final match of the 1973–74 season against arch-rivals Manchester United, who needed to win to have any hope of avoiding relegation. Former United player Denis Law scored with a backheel to give City a 1–0 win at Old Trafford and confirm the relegation of their rivals. The final trophy of the club's most successful period was won in 1976, when Newcastle United were beaten 2–1 in the League Cup final.

A long period of decline followed the success of the 1960s and 1970s. Malcolm Allison rejoined the club to become manager for the second time in 1979, but squandered large sums of money on unsuccessful signings, such as Steve Daley. A succession of managers then followed – seven in the 1980s alone. Under John Bond, City reached the 1981 FA Cup final but lost in a replay to Tottenham Hotspur. The club were twice relegated from the top flight in the 1980s (in 1983 and 1987), but returned to the top flight again in 1989 and finished fifth in 1991 and 1992 under the management of Peter Reid. However, this was only a temporary respite, and following Reid's departure Manchester City's fortunes continued to fade. City were co-founders of the Premier League upon its creation in 1992, but after finishing ninth in its first season they endured three seasons of struggle before being relegated in 1996. After two seasons in Division One, City fell to the lowest point in their history, becoming the second ever European trophy winners to be relegated to their country's third league tier, after 1. FC Magdeburg of Germany.

== 2001–present ==
After relegation, the club underwent off-the-field upheaval, with new chairman David Bernstein introducing greater fiscal discipline. City were promoted at the first attempt, achieved in dramatic fashion in a play-off against Gillingham. A second successive promotion saw City return to the top division, but this proved to have been a step too far for the recovering club, and in 2001 City were relegated once more. Kevin Keegan arrived as the new manager in the close season, bringing an immediate return to the top division as the club won the 2001–02 Division One championship, breaking club records for the number of points gained and goals scored in a season in the process. The 2002–03 season was the last at Maine Road, and included a 3–1 derby victory over rivals Manchester United, ending a run of 13 years without a derby win. City also qualified for European competition for the first time in 25 years. In the 2003 close season the club moved to the new City of Manchester Stadium. The first four seasons at the stadium all resulted in mid-table finishes. Former England manager Sven-Göran Eriksson became the club's first manager from overseas when appointed in 2007. After a bright start performances faded in the second half of the season, and Eriksson was sacked in June 2008. Eriksson was replaced by Mark Hughes two days later on 4 June 2008.

By 2008, the club was in a financially precarious position. Former Thai prime minister Thaksin Shinawatra had taken control of the club a year before, but his political travails saw his assets frozen. Then, in August 2008, the club was purchased by the Abu Dhabi United Group. The takeover was immediately followed by a flurry of bids for high-profile players; the club broke the British transfer record by signing Brazilian international Robinho from Real Madrid for £32.5 million. Performances were not a huge improvement on the previous season despite the influx of money however, with the team finishing tenth, although they did well to reach the quarter-finals of the UEFA Cup. During the summer of 2009, the club took transfer spending to an unprecedented level, with an outlay of over £100 million on players Gareth Barry, Roque Santa Cruz, Kolo Touré, Emmanuel Adebayor, Carlos Tevez and Joleon Lescott. In December 2009, Mark Hughes—who had been hired shortly before the change in ownership but was originally retained by the new board—was replaced as manager by Roberto Mancini. City finished the season in fifth position in the Premier League, narrowly missing out on a place in the Champions League, and competed in the UEFA Europa League in season 2010–11.

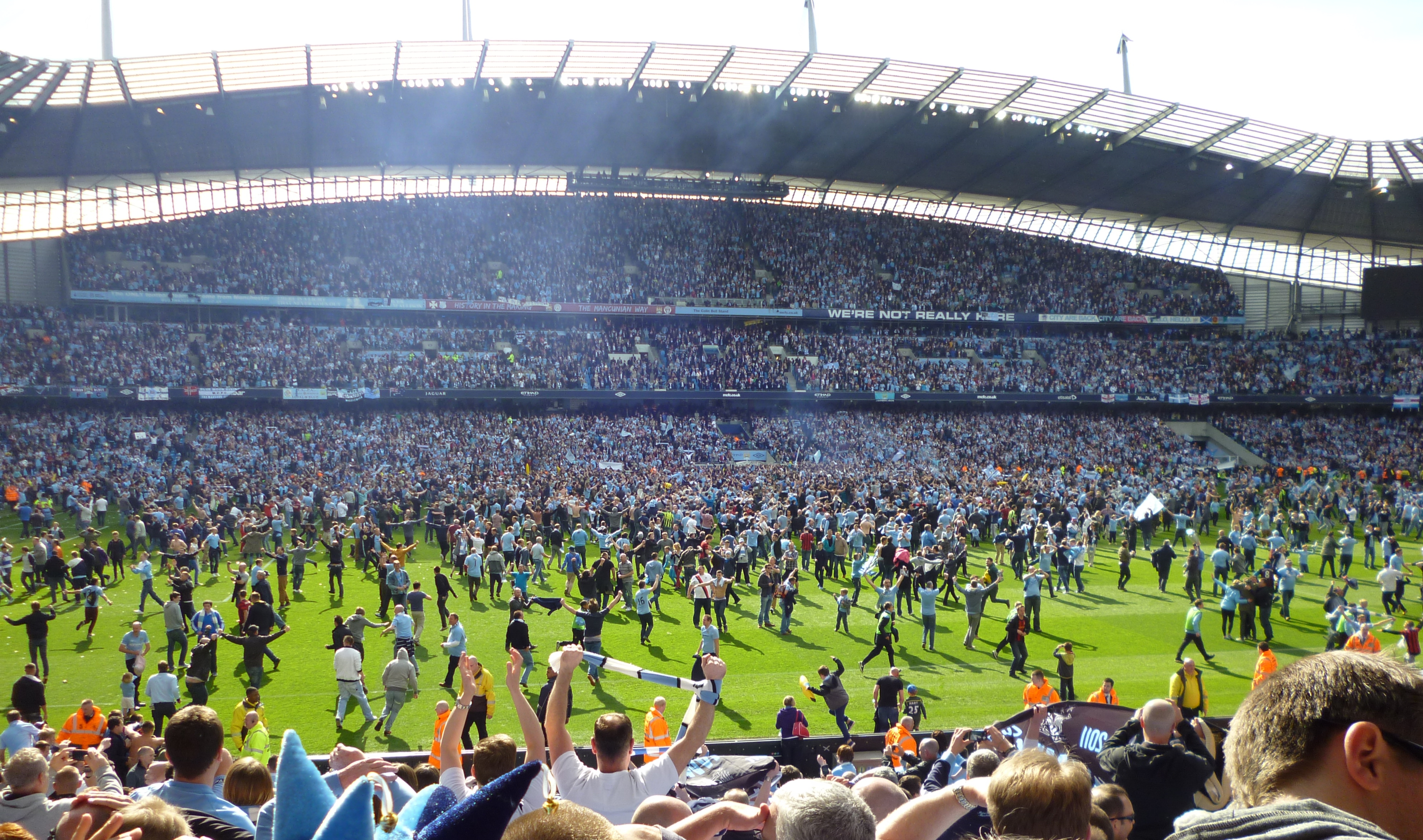
Manchester City supporters invade the pitch following their 2011–12 Premier League title victory.

Continued investment in players followed in successive seasons, and results began to match the upturn in player quality. City reached the 2011 FA Cup Final, their first major final in over thirty years, after defeating derby rivals Manchester United in the semi-final, the first time they had knocked their rival out of a cup competition since 1975. They defeated Stoke City 1–0 in the final, securing their fifth FA Cup, the club's first major trophy since winning the 1976 League Cup. In the same week, the club qualified for the UEFA Champions League for the first time since 1968 with a 1–0 Premier League win over Tottenham Hotspur. On the last day of the 2010–11 season, City passed Arsenal for third place in the Premier League, thereby securing qualification directly into the Champions League group stage. Strong performances continued to follow in the 2011–12 season, with the club beginning the following season in commanding form, including beating Tottenham 5–1 at White Hart Lane and humbling Manchester United by a 6–1 scoreline in United's own stadium. Although the strong form waned half-way through the season, and City at one point fell eight points behind their bitter rivals with only six games left to play, an unprecedented slump by the previous champions allowed the blue side of Manchester to draw back level with two games to go, setting up a thrilling finale to the season with both teams going into the last day equal on points. Despite City only needing a home win against a team in the relegation zone, they still managed to fall a goal behind by the end of normal time, leading some of United's players to finish their game celebrating in the belief that they had won the league. Two goals in injury time—including one scored almost five minutes after normal time had elapsed—resulted in an almost-literal last-minute title victory, City's first in 44 years, and became only the fifth team to win the Premier League since its creation in 1992. In the aftermath that followed, the event was described by media sources from the UK and around the world as the greatest moment in Premier League history.

After an end to the season which many believed would only spur City on, however, the following season failed to capitalise on any of the gains made in the first two full seasons of Mancini's reign. The transfer window saw virtually no players join the club until the last day of the season, when a last-minute burst of activity saw four different players all join in the space of around 10 hours. The free-flowing football of the previous season was suddenly rare to behold, and while City rarely seemed likely to drop below second in the table, they posed little title challenge all season. In the UEFA Champions League, the club was eliminated at the group stage for a second successive season, in a result which seemed to confirm Mancini's reputation as far better at managing in domestic games than European, while a second FA Cup final in three seasons ended in a 1–0 defeat to relegated Wigan Athletic. The loss resulted in Mancini's dismissal, ostensibly as he had failed to reach his targets for the season but with many in the press suggesting a breakdown of relations between Mancini and his players but also between the Italian and his board-level superiors, while a refusal to promote young players was also cited. In his place was appointed the Chilean Manuel Pellegrini, who boasted a far more impressive Champions League record but less of a reputation for trophy-winning.

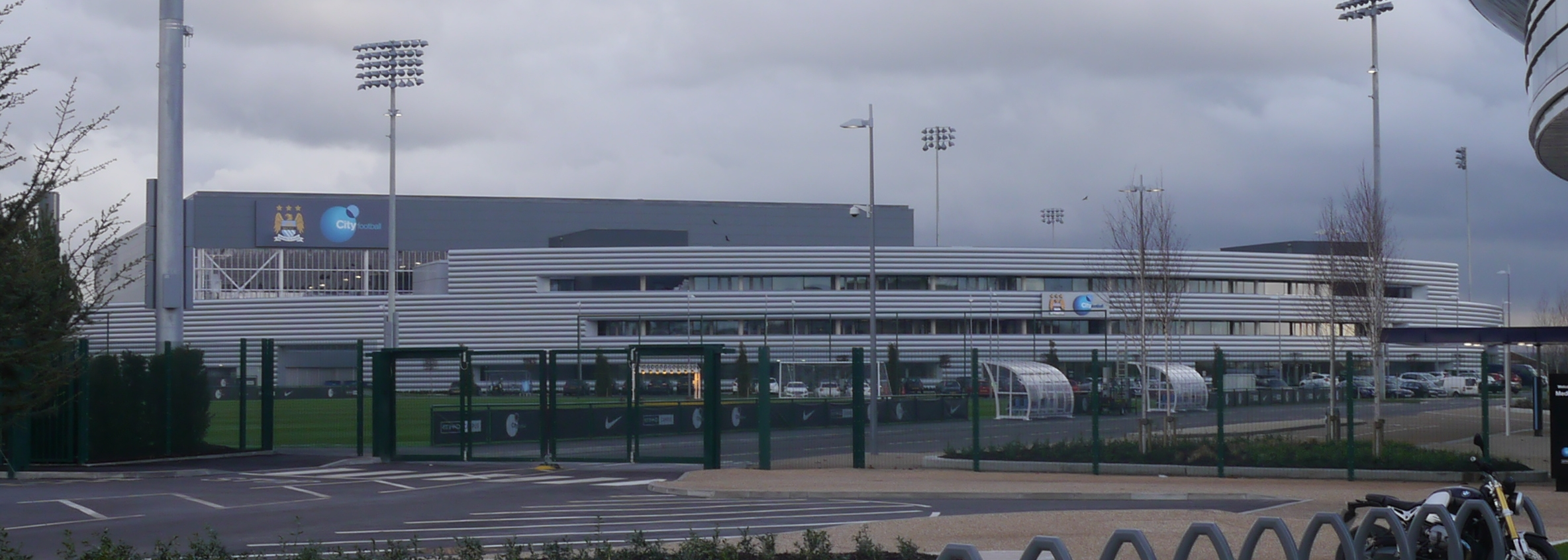
Manchester City moved into their new complex at the Etihad Campus adjacent to the City of Manchester Stadium in 2014.

In Pellegrini's first season, City won the League Cup and regained the Premier League title on the last matchday of the season. However, the team's league form was less impressive in the next couple of years: although they finished as runners-up in 2014–15, the 2015–16 campaign saw City end up fourth on goal difference, their lowest position since 2010. On the other hand, Pellegrini delivered another League Cup win and, more importantly, he guided City to the Champions League semi-finals, which they narrowly lost to future champions Real Madrid. This was the club's highest-ever finish in the Champions League, but Pellegrini's reign was nonetheless ended in anticipation of City's dream manager.

Pep Guardiola, former head coach of Barcelona and Bayern Munich, was confirmed to become Manchester City's new manager on 1 February 2016, months before Pellegrini finished his term, and has remained in charge to this day. In the Guardiola era, City won the 2017–18 Premier League title with the highest points total in history and broke numerous other club and English league records along the way. They also won the League Cup that season and Sergio Agüero became the club's all-time leading goalscorer.

The following season, Guardiola guided the club to retain their Premier League and League Cup titles, the first time in history that City had completed any successful title defence. The team then went on to win the FA Cup final and complete an unprecedented domestic treble of English men's titles.

In 2020, UEFA banned Manchester City from European competitions for two seasons for alleged breaches of the UEFA Financial Fair Play Regulations; the club appealed to the Court of Arbitration for Sport, who overturned the ban within months, finding that some allegations were above the five-years-old limit for such UEFA investigations, while the other allegations were unproven. The CAS also reduced UEFA's fine from €30 to €10 million.

In the COVID-19 affected 2020–21 Premier League season, Manchester City regained their title from Liverpool, becoming champions for the third time in four years. They ended the season twelve points ahead of second-placed Manchester United, winning the title with three games to spare. They also won the League Cup for a record-equalling fourth consecutive and eighth time in total, beating Tottenham 1–0 in the final. City's league victory was the tenth league and cup title of Guardiola's five-year tenure, making him the most successful manager in the club's history. The season was highlighted by City's European breakthrough, with the club reaching their first-ever Champions League final, where they met Chelsea, making it the third all-English final in the competition's history. However, the Blues were defeated 1–0 at the Estádio do Dragão in Porto, courtesy of a Kai Havertz goal. Still, City's breakthrough marked their most successful European campaign to date.

The Blues produced another campaign to remember in 2021–22, retaining their league title, following another close title race with Liverpool and making it four titles in five seasons. In another case of "typical City", needing four points from their last two fixtures, the Blues had fallen behind by two goals in both games, only to recover to a 2–2 draw against West Ham away, and to a 3–2 win at home to Aston Villa in the season finale. These last three goals were all scored in a five-minute blitz between the 76th and 81st minutes, in moments that would sit alongside the victories in the 1999 play-off final against Gillingham and the 2011–12 Premier League finale against QPR. City also reached the Champions League semi-finals again that season (and for the third time in their history), but were beaten there by Real Madrid 6–5 on aggregate a.e.t. over two closely fought.

As of the end of the 2021–22 season, Manchester City had won four league titles in five seasons under Guardiola's reign, retaining them on two occasions. They had twice won the title by a single point from Liverpool, in the process developing a fierce new rivalry, that also translated to managers Guardiola and Jürgen Klopp, as well as the fans of the respective clubs. Guardiola had also guided City to their first ever Champions League final, and a further semi-finals, which was lost in dramatic circumstances to Real Madrid. The 2020–21 and 2021–22 seasons were also notable as the end of City's record goalscorer Sergio Agüero's career at the club after 10 seasons and 260 goals. The Blues struggled to immediately recruit a replacement and so employed a false nine role extensively in accomplishing their objectives these seasons.

However, with the European success eluding the City squad, some pundits and fans like still questioned whether that side would go down in history as one of the greatest of all time. In the 2022–23 season, Manchester City won their third consecutive Premier League title, the FA Cup final against rivals Manchester United, and their maiden Champions League title, thereby assembling a continental treble. The road to the Champions League victory included victories over Bayern Munich, who were defeated 4–1 on aggregate, and Real Madrid, who experienced a 1–5 aggregate loss at the hands of City after their 6–5 extra time victory at the same stage a year before.

The following season saw considerably fewer success for the Blues, as they won the UEFA Super Cup and FIFA Club World Cup for the first time and became the first English men's club to win four consecutive league titles. City also advanced to the FA Cup final for the second straight year but lost in a rematch to rivals Manchester United. The 2024–25 season turned out to expose major flaws in City's aging squad, as the Blues managed to win only the Community Shield in another rematch against United. They also advanced to their third consecutive FA Cup final but lost to Crystal Palace.

The 2025-2026 season saw a return to form for Citizens. City nearly clinched a 7th title in 9 season, finishing a close 2nd, and winning a domestic double with the FA Cup and Carabao Cup.

On 25 September 2026, Manchester City were found guilty of 114 charges relating to breaches of the Premier League's financial regulations. The club have maintained their innocence vehemently, and on October 1, 2026 filed a formal appeal.

== See also ==
- Manchester City F.C. seasons
