= Maine Road =

Former stadium of Manchester City

- Aerial view of Maine Road on 11 May 2003, the day of the final match
- Interactive map of Maine Road
- Location: Moss Side, Manchester, England
- Coordinates: 53°27′4″N 2°14′7″W
- Owner: Manchester City
- Operator: Manchester City (1923–2003)
- Capacity: 35,150 (at closure); 84,569 (record)

Construction
- Built: 1923
- Opened: 1923
- Renovated: 1931, 1957, 1970, 1994
- Expanded: 1935
- Closed: 2003
- Demolished: 2004
- Cost: £100,000
- Architect: Charles Swain
- Structural engineer: Sir Robert McAlpine

Tenants
- Manchester City (1923–2003); Manchester United (1945–1949, 1956–1957)

Maine Road was a football stadium in Moss Side, Manchester, England, that was home to Manchester City from 1923 to 2003. It hosted FA Cup semi-finals, the Charity Shield, a League Cup final and England matches. Maine Road's highest attendance of 84,569 was set in 1934 at an FA Cup sixth round match between Manchester City and Stoke City, a record for an English club ground.

At the time of its closure in 2003, Maine Road was an all-seater stadium with a capacity of 35,150 and of haphazard design with stands of varying heights due to the ground being renovated several times over its 80-year history. The following season Manchester City moved to the City of Manchester Stadium in east Manchester, a mile from the city centre and near Ardwick, where the club originally formed in 1880.

== History ==
=== Decision to move ===
Plans to build Maine Road were first announced in May 1922, following a decision by Manchester City to leave their Hyde Road ground, which did not have room for expansion and its main stand had been severely damaged by fire in 1920.

Two sites in Belle Vue in east Manchester were suggested, but neither was deemed sufficient. To many City fans east Manchester was regarded as City's home and a move to Belle Vue seemed right. But the site was just 8 acres (32,000 m^{2}) and an available lease of fifty years was deemed too short by the club, so it was decided that City would move to Moss Side. The move to a larger stadium at Maine Road was backed by then manager Ernest Mangnall.

Many were disappointed when a site in south Manchester was chosen. A City director, John Ayrton, resigned from the board later in the decade and helped to form a breakaway club, Manchester Central, which played at Belle Vue.

=== Construction ===
The main stand in the 1930s

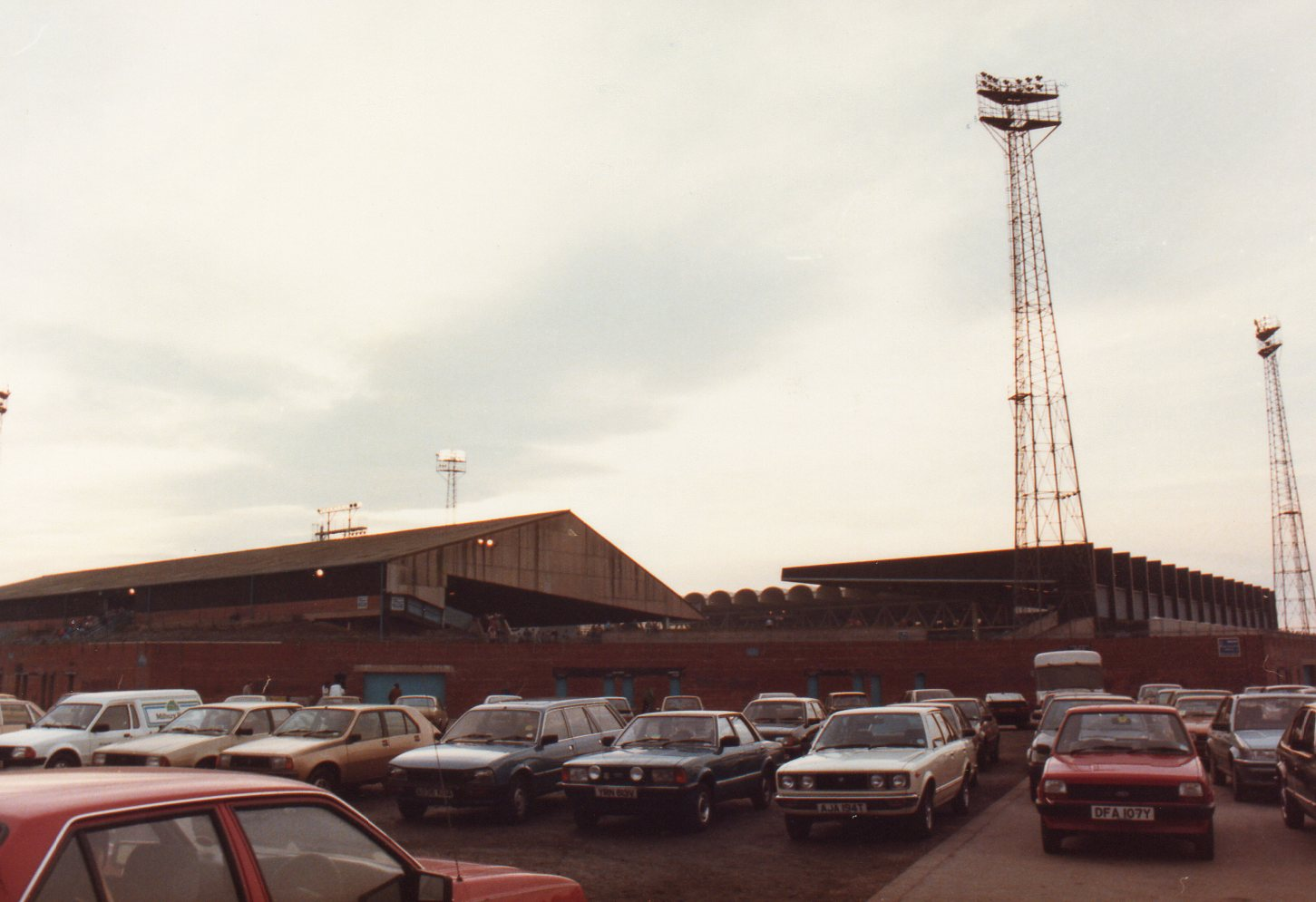
Facing the Kippax Stand in 1985

A 16.25 acre former brickworks on Maine Road was purchased for £5,500. The road was originally known as Dog Kennel Lane but renamed Maine Road (after the Maine law) during the 1870s at the insistence of the Temperance movement which owned land on Dog Kennel Lane and the local authority accepted its request.

During construction, the stadium was reputedly cursed by a Gypsy when officials evicted a Gypsy camp from the area. This curse was allegedly removed on 28 December 1998. However, the Gypsy curse is likely to be an urban myth, as such stories are endemic to a number of Football League grounds. Construction took 300 days at a total cost of £100,000. The initial layout of the ground consisted of one covered stand with a seating capacity of 10,000, and uncovered terracing on the other three sides, with gentle curves connecting the corners.

=== Early years and record attendance ===
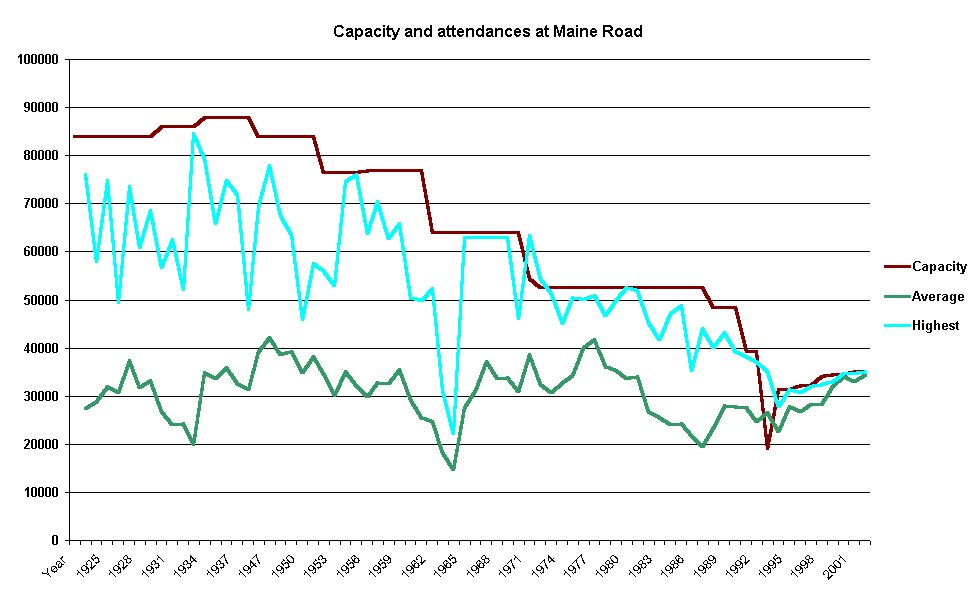
Progressive capacity and attendances for Manchester City matches at Maine Road

The first match at Maine Road took place on 25 August 1923 when 58,159 fans watched Manchester City beat Sheffield United 2–1. The first changes to the ground took place in 1931, when the corner between the Main Stand and the Platt Lane end at the south of the ground was rebuilt to incorporate a roof. This renovation was the first of many, as Maine Road's layout and capacity was varied throughout its lifespan.

In 1934, the highest attendance for an English football club playing at their own stadium was recorded at Maine Road, when 84,569 fans watched Manchester City play Stoke City in the sixth round of the FA Cup on 3 March 1934. (A larger crowd of 121,919 attended the Crystal Palace ground when it hosted the 1913 FA Cup Final between Aston Villa and Sunderland.) Queues formed four hours before the match, and one journalist stated that Maine Road was packed two hours before kick-off. A decision was taken to close the turnstiles with an attendance at approximately 85,000, 3000 short of what was thought to be the maximum capacity. Supporters witnessed a visiting Stoke team which included Stanley Matthews and City's team boasted players Frank Swift, Fred Tilson, Sam Cowan and Matt Busby. The match was won 1–0 by Manchester City. This is the record home attendance for a domestic match and the record home attendance at a club ground, as the 1913 FA Cup final was played at a neutral venue.

Changes at the Platt Lane end took place in 1935, extending the terracing and providing a roof for the full stand. This marked the peak capacity of the ground, estimated at 88,000. Further changes were planned, but suspended when Manchester City were relegated from the First Division in 1938 and abandoned when World War II broke out.

=== Post Second World War ===
The stadium was shared by Manchester United after the Second World War as Manchester United's Old Trafford ground had been damaged during the Manchester Blitz. United paid City £5,000 per season, plus a share of gate receipts. The highest attendance for a league game at Maine Road occurred during this period, when 83,260 people watched Manchester United play Arsenal on 17 January 1948. This figure is a national record for a league game. Maine Road was also used by Manchester United to host three of their four home games in the 1956–57 European Cup, until floodlights were installed at Old Trafford as required by UEFA.

=== 1950s to 1980s ===
Floodlights for the stadium were installed in 1953 and further development took place in 1957. This was prompted by the hosting of two FA Cup semi-finals in successive years, the side facing the Main Stand (which until that time was generally known as the Popular Side) was redeveloped and named The Kippax after a nearby street. Over the course of the 1960s and 1970s, the Kippax became the part of the ground where the club's most vociferous fans congregated. In 1963, benches were installed at the Platt Lane end, meaning that Maine Road had more seats than any other English club ground at the time. The next major redevelopment came in the 1970s, with the construction of the North Stand, a cantilevered stand which remained in place until the ground's closure. The 1980s saw ambitious plans for improvements: however, these plans were shelved due to financial pressures after the Main Stand roof had been replaced at a cost of £1 million.

=== Modernisation ===
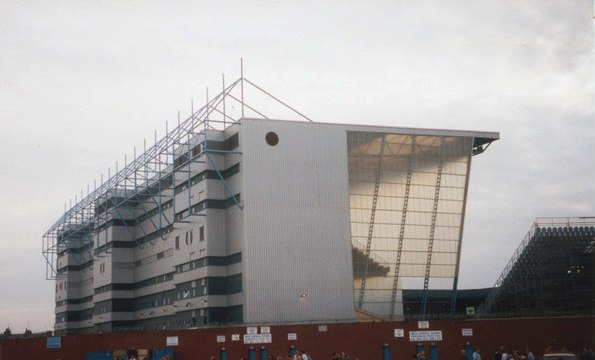
The new, taller Kippax Stand

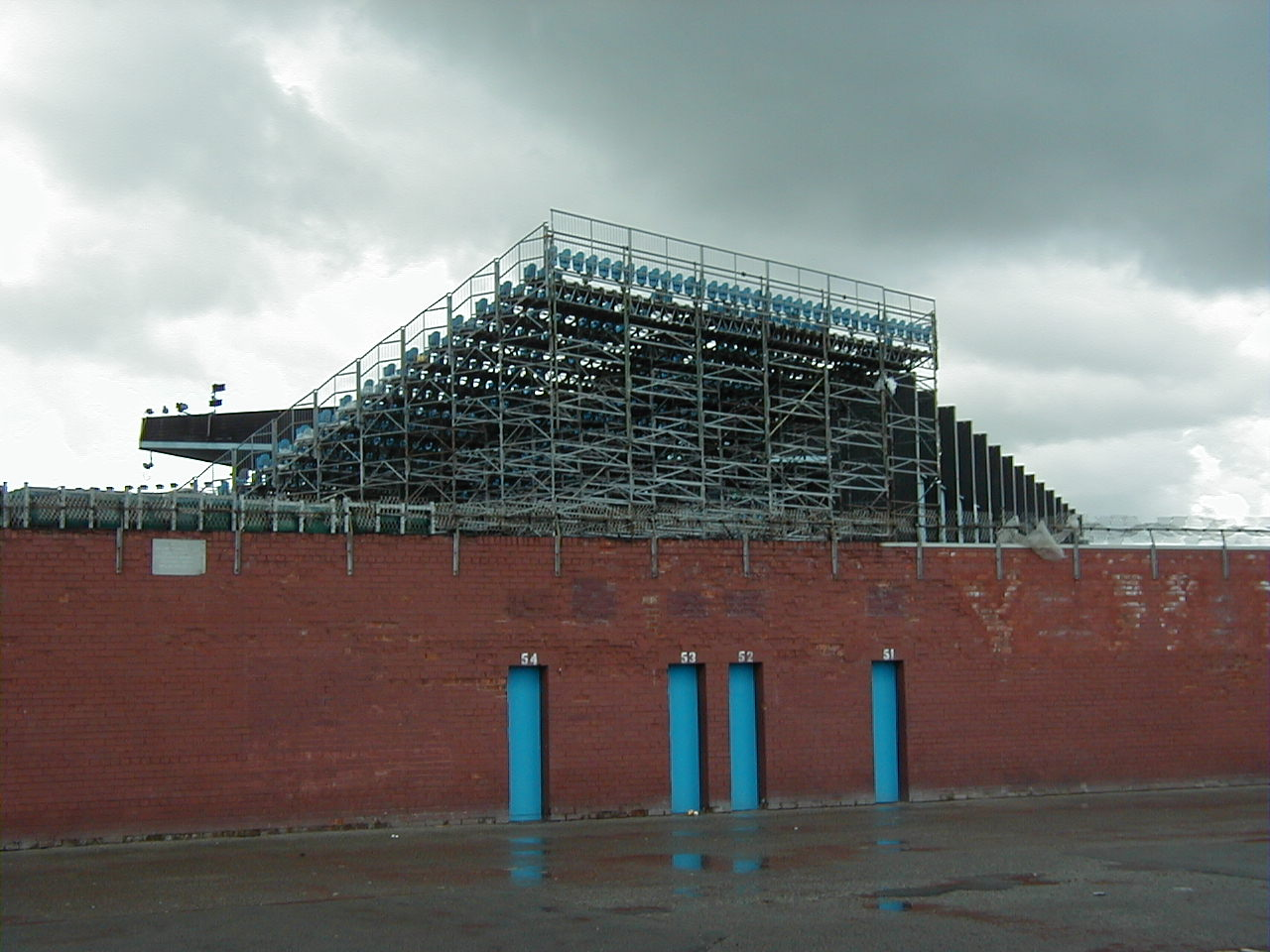
The temporary "Gene Kelly Stand" in the corner of the ground

By 1990, some areas of the ground were becoming outdated, and there was the need for the stadium to become all-seater following the outcome of the Taylor Report in January that year, and the Platt Lane stand was demolished in 1992. Its place was taken by the all-seater Umbro Stand that also incorporated executive boxes and was opened in March 1993. The name reverted to the Platt Lane Stand in 1997, when Kappa replaced Umbro as City's kit suppliers.

The era of standing accommodation at Maine Road came to an end in May 1994 as the stadium became all-seater to comply with the requirements of the Taylor Report, with the demolition of the Kippax Street Terrace, which, unusually for an all-standing area, was located at the side of the pitch instead of behind the goals. The final match with standing permitted took place on 30 April 1994, against Chelsea for a 2–2 draw. Immediately before demolition, the capacity of the Kippax terrace was 18,300. A three-tier stand was built in its place, holding nearly 14,000 spectators, and on its completion in October 1995 it was the tallest stand in the country, built at a cost of £16 million, four times the turnover of the club, according to then-chairman Francis Lee. The revamp of the Kippax was the second phase of a five-part development plan that would have cost £40million and increased the stadium's capacity to 45,024. However, the club abandoned these plans as City were relegated from the Premier League in 1996 and from Division One two years later.

The new stand was an impressive modern facility, but it also emphasised the haphazard nature in which the ground had been redeveloped, as all four sides were of differing heights and construction styles. There were further plans for expansion that would have taken the stadium's capacity to 45,000, but these were put on hold following City's relegation from the Premier League in 1996.

=== Final match and move to City of Manchester Stadium ===
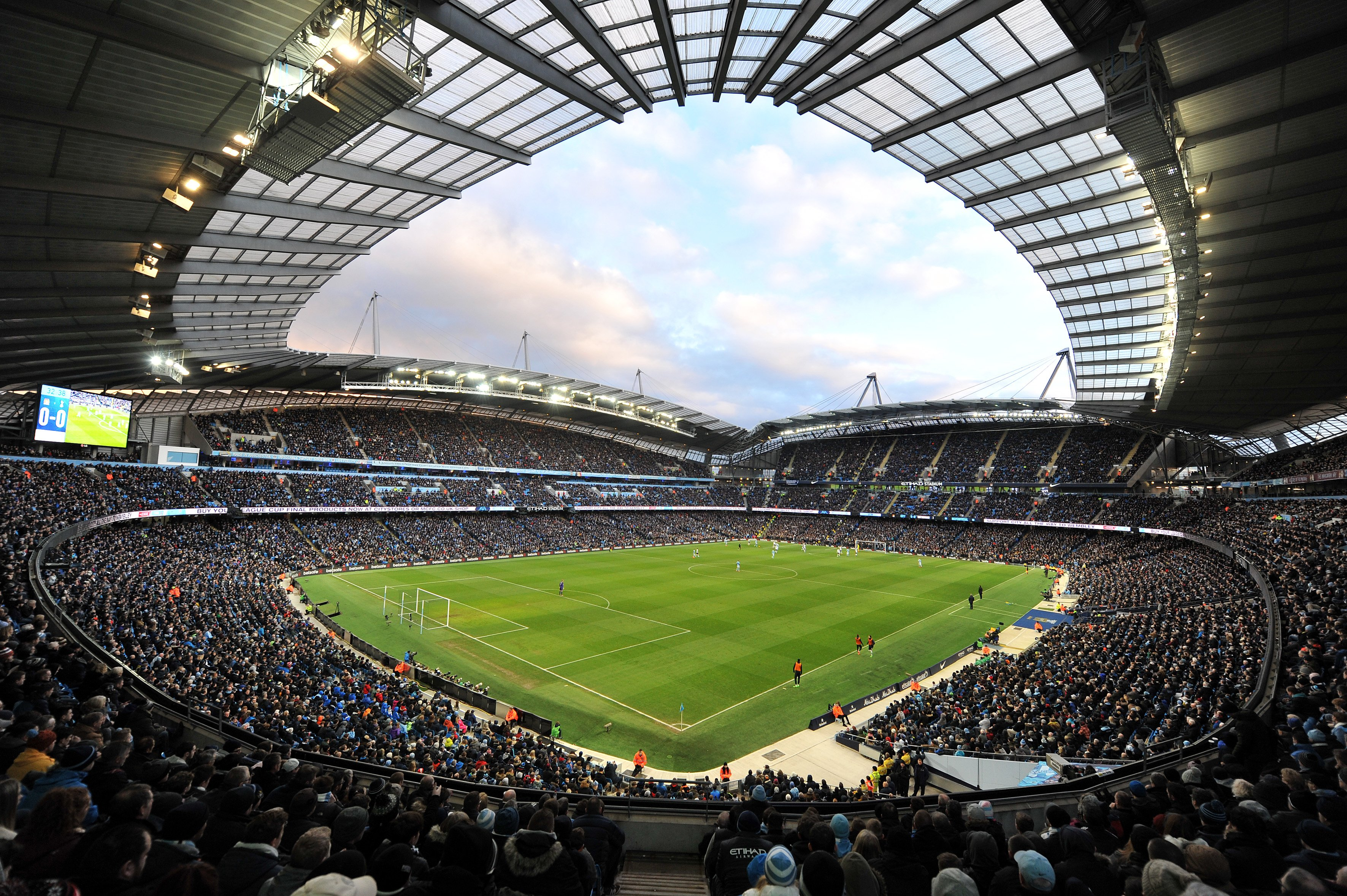
City vacated Maine Road and moved to the City of Manchester Stadium in 2003.

There were plans for further expansion at Maine Road to take the capacity to an all-seated 45,000, but these were abandoned in favour of a move to the City of Manchester Stadium built for the 2002 Commonwealth Games.

The final competitive match before the closure of the stadium took place on 11 May 2003 with a Premiership match against Southampton. Tickets were sold upwards of £250 and a crowd of 34,957, about 100 short of maximum capacity, filled Maine Road for the final day. City lost the match 1–0 with Michael Svensson scoring the stadium's last goal. The final match was followed by performances by musical acts Badly Drawn Boy and Doves.

City's final goal at the stadium was scored on 21 April 2003 by Marc-Vivien Foé during a 3–0 victory over Sunderland. Sixty-six days later, Fóe died on 26 June from an undetected heart condition while representing the Cameroon national football team during the 2003 Confederations Cup.

An auction of the ground's fixtures and fittings took place in July 2003, raising £100,000, which was donated to community projects in the Moss Side area, which was undergoing a lengthy regeneration process. The two penalty spots and the centre spot were thought to be the most desired mementos, but all three had been cut out from the grass before the auction took place. The auction lasted for seven hours and 1,000 supporters attended the auction, with interest from clubs such as Preston North End and Norwich City for the bigger lots which could be reused.

=== Redevelopment plans ===
Demolition of Maine Road and the Maine Place development

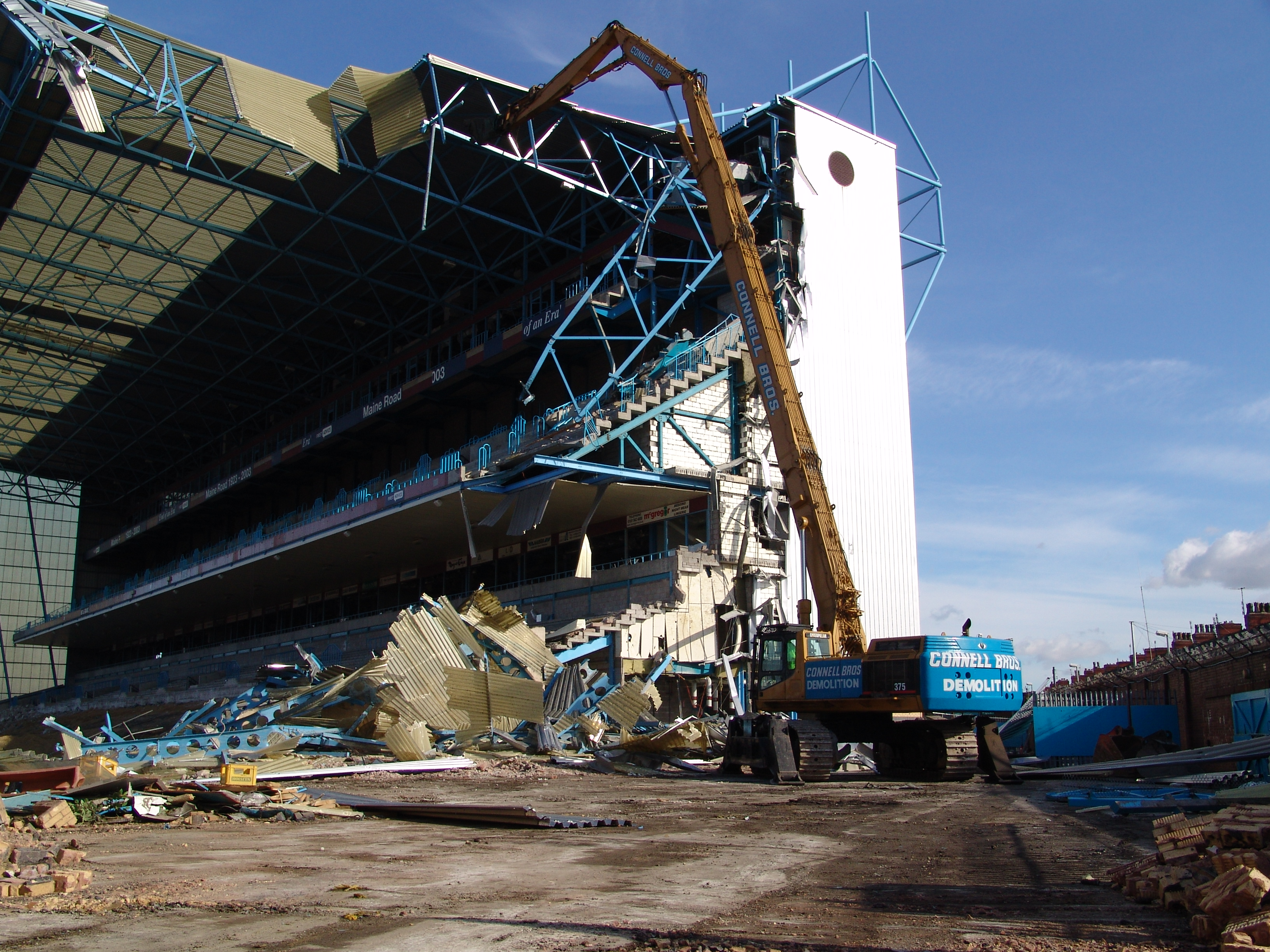
The Kippax Stand during demolition

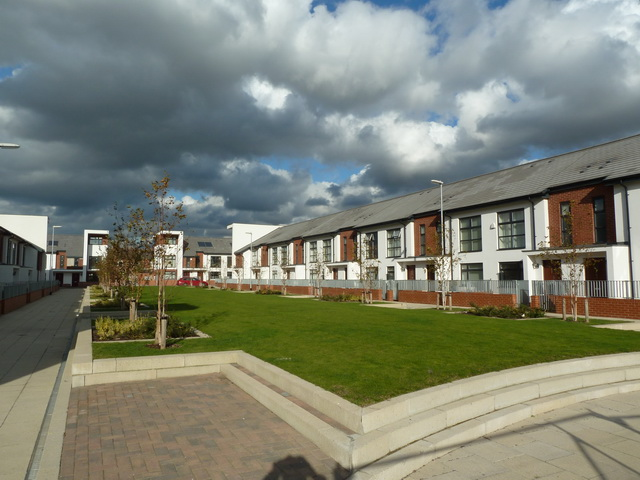
Carnival Place, part of the Maine Place development

Towards the end of Maine Road's lifespan there were proposals for other sports teams to make use of the stadium following City's relocation; Stockport County once expressed interest in moving there from Edgeley Park, and in December 2000 Sale Sharks rugby union club was offered a lease for the stadium. However, none of the proposals came to fruition and some past City players stated their dismay at the stadium not being renovated for a mixed-use sports stadium. Demolition began in late 2003, lasting around 10 months.

Two years later approval was given for a new housing development to be built on the site, consisting of 474 homes. There is a public art display commemorating the stadium and features a circular plate half open, symbolising the centre spot and the new emerging development which now sits on the Maine Road stadium.

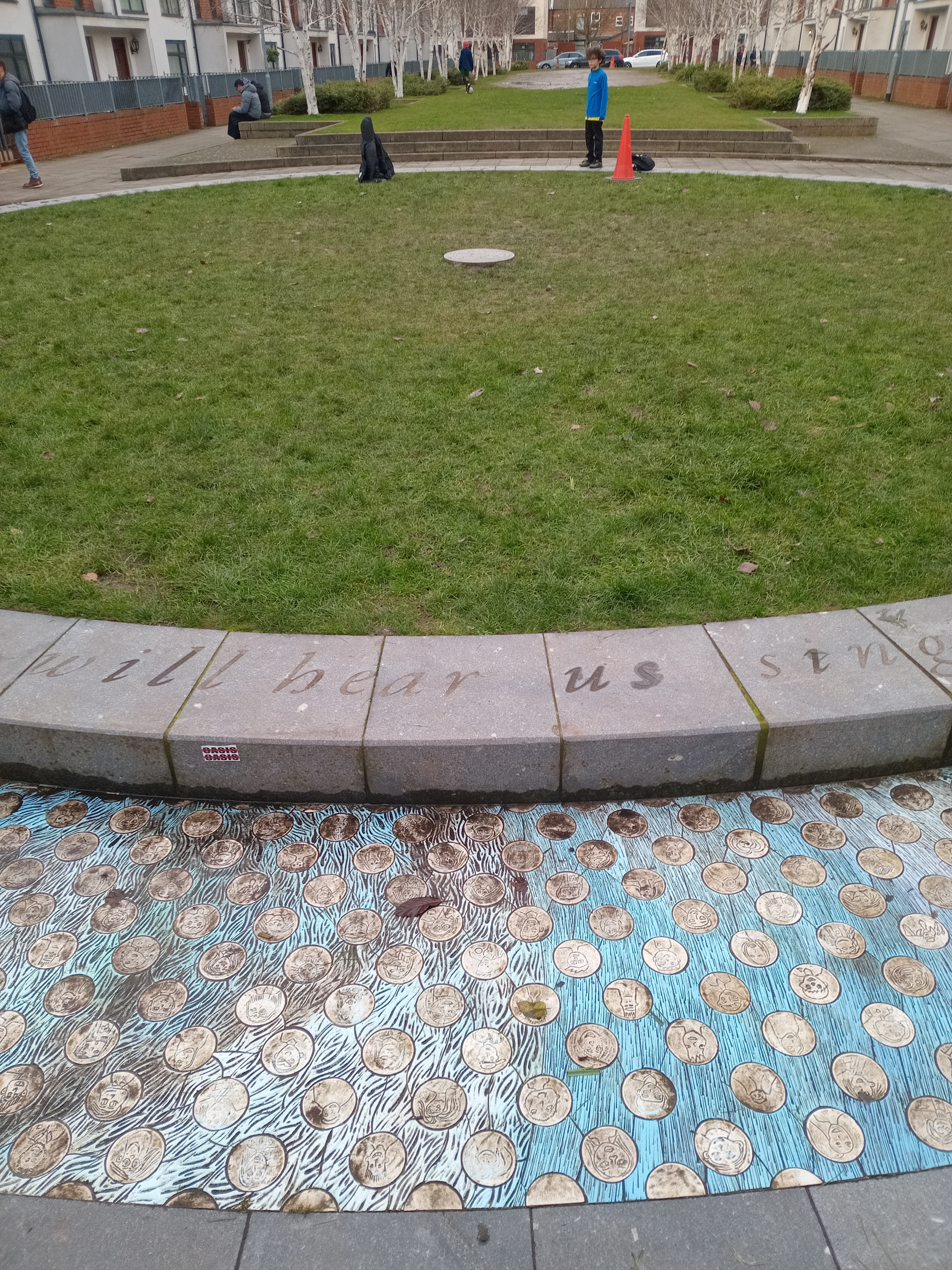
The centre spot of the former football pitch in 2026, now a green space surrounded by houses

== Pitch ==
For long periods of its history Maine Road had the widest pitch in England. However, the width was changed several times by managers wishing to alter the pitch size to suit their style of play. In the final season before the ground was closed, the pitch size was 107 × 71 metres (116.5 × 78 yards). Maine Road's replacement, the City of Manchester Stadium, has maintained this tradition of having a large pitch.

== Other uses ==
FA Cup semi-finals at Maine Road
#	Date	Winner	Score	Loser
1	1928	Huddersfield Town	1–0	Sheffield United
2	1946	Derby County	4–1	Birmingham City
3	1947	Burnley	1–0	Liverpool
4	1950	Liverpool	2–0	Everton
5	1951	Blackpool	0–0	Birmingham City
6	1953	Bolton Wanderers	4–3	Everton
7	1954	Preston North End	2–0	Sheffield Wednesday
8	1958	Bolton Wanderers	2–1	Blackburn Rovers
9	1960	Blackburn Rovers	2–1	Sheffield Wednesday
10	1973	Leeds United	1–0 aet	Wolverhampton Wanderers
11	1975	Fulham	1–0	Birmingham City
12	1977	Liverpool	2–2	Everton
13	1977	Liverpool	3–0	Everton
14	1979	Manchester United	2–2	Liverpool
15	1985	Manchester United	2–1	Liverpool
16	1990	Manchester United	3–3	Oldham Athletic
17	1990	Manchester United	2–1	Oldham Athletic
18	1994	Manchester United	4–1	Oldham Athletic

Maine Road hosted two England internationals, the first was a 3–0 defeat of Wales on 13 November 1946 and the second a 9–2 win over Northern Ireland on 16 November 1949, England's first ever World Cup qualifier. In addition, a number of wartime internationals were held at the ground. Maine Road was also the venue for a number of rugby league matches, hosting the Rugby Football League Championship Final eleven times between 1938 and 1956. It also hosted the rugby league match of the cross code challenge between Wigan Rugby League and Bath rugby union.

Maine Road hosted Manchester United's first three home games of the 1956–57 European Cup, as Old Trafford did not have floodlights installed and so was deemed unsuitable to host matches in the tournament. The first European match at the ground saw United thrash Belgian champions RSC Anderlecht 10–0 in the preliminary round, a competition record which stood for seventeen years.

It hosted many FA Cup semi-finals, the last being in April 1994 when Manchester United beat Oldham Athletic 4–1 in a replay. It hosted the 1984 Football League Cup final replay, which Liverpool won 1–0 against Everton.

The stadium was used for several scenes in the 1948 motion picture Cup-tie Honeymoon. In later years, it was featured in the 2000 film There's Only One Jimmy Grimble and the 2003 ITV drama The Second Coming, which starred Christopher Eccleston.

The stadium hosted concerts by many famous artists, including Bryan Adams, Bon Jovi, Belinda Carlisle, David Bowie, David Cassidy, Dire Straits, Faith No More, Fleetwood Mac, Guns N' Roses, Jean Michel Jarre, Mavis Staples, Mike and the Mechanics, Motörhead, The New Power Generation, Oasis, Pink Floyd, Prince, Queen, Rod Stewart, The Rolling Stones, Simple Minds, Soundgarden, and Status Quo, among others. The most high-profile concert held at Maine Road was that of Mancunian band Oasis (themselves avowed Manchester City fans) in April 1996, a performance which was later released as a video, ...There and Then.

In June 1961, the American Christian evangelist Billy Graham attracted over 100,000 people to the stadium, over the course of four nights, as part of his UK tour.

== Maine Road Football Club ==
Maine Road also gives its name to a non-league football club, Maine Road FC. The club, who currently play in the North West Counties Football League Division One, was founded by a group of Manchester City supporters in 1955. The club previously based its headquarters at the social club adjoining Maine Road.
