= Malta Files =

Financial scandal

The Malta Files is the name of the financial scandal revealing the content of several hundred thousand official documents detailing the procedures developed by Malta to organize tax evasion within the European Union (EU). Malta uses its EU member status to fiscally host large corporations and wealthy private clients, enabling them to evade their home countries' taxation.

The Malta Files scandal was revealed in May 2017 following investigations by the European Investigative Collaborations (EIC) network. The revelations highlighted tax avoidance practices implemented in Malta. ECR subsequently received thousands of documents, which were later analysed by various media organisations. According to De Morgen, the data leak contained 150,000 confidential documents.

== Background ==
=== Political context ===
During the revelation of the Panama Papers scandal in April 2016, the wife of the Prime Minister of Malta, Joseph Muscat, and his chief of staff were identified as holders of shell corporations in Panama. The chief of staff was also accused of receiving bribes as part of the Citizenship scheme program, which is controversial within the European Union. The accumulation of nebulous elements led the Prime Minister (Labour) to call early elections, giving the vote the appearance of a plebiscite on his name.

On 11 January 2017, as Malta assumed the Presidency of the Council of the European Union, Green MEPs released a report accusing Malta of being a tax haven. The report pointed to:

- the refund of 6/7ths of the tax initially collected on dividends from trading companies paid to foreign shareholders;
- the non-verification of fiscal treatment inconsistencies leading to double "non-taxation" ;
- an attractive intellectual property taxation regime;
- an attractive VAT regime for yachts.

== Investigation ==
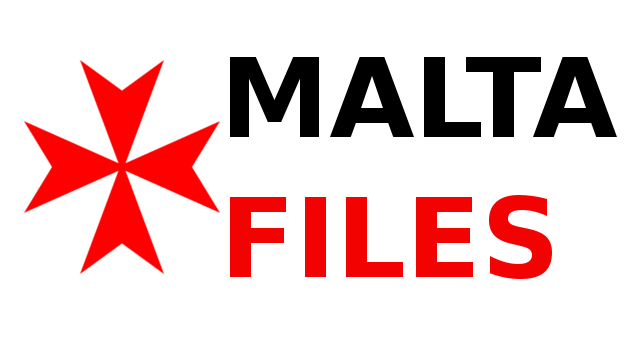
Malta Files logo

The investigation was coordinated by the European Investigative Collaborations and carried out by 49 journalists from thirteen newspapers who had been investigating the case since July 2016. Among these media outlets were German (Der Spiegel), Spanish (El Mundo), Portuguese (Expresso), Italian (L'Espresso), Belgian (Le Soir), Maltese (Malta Today), French (Mediapart), Croatian (Nacional), Serbian (Newsweek Serbia), Dutch (NRC), Swedish (Dagens Nyheter), Danish (Politiken), Romanian (The Black Sea), and British (The Intercept newspapers).

Furthermore, at the end of April 2017, the German Land of North Rhine-Westphalia began investigating 1,200 to 2,000 shell companies linked to groups from that country. On 10 May 2017, the Finance Minister of North Rhine-Westphalia, Norbert Walter-Borjans, publicly announced the hunt for these Maltese shell companies.

== Revelations ==
Starting Friday, 19 May 2017, and over a two-week period, the 13 European newspapers involved in the investigation published 150,000 confidential documents revealing the workings of the tax haven that Malta represents. Initial revelations indicated an estimated annual loss of between €1.5 and €4 billion in tax revenue for other European countries. The first elements revealed by Mediapart concerned "tax optimisation and evasion, money laundering, and corruption."

=== Financial arrangements used ===
==== Reduction of corporate tax on dividends paid to foreign investors ====
Malta's corporation tax is one of the highest in the European Union, at 35%. Ostensibly, this is not attractive for companies wishing to use Malta for tax optimization. However, it is possible to obtain a refund of 6/7ths of the tax due to the Maltese Treasury on dividends paid when the company is owned by foreign investors. This brings the effective corporate tax rate down to a much more advantageous 5%. These tax rules are supported by Malta's two main political parties. They were verified when Malta applied to join the European Union, an accession that took effect on 1 January 2004. These tax rules differ from specific tax agreements between a state and a company (tax rulings), as in Malta, all companies can benefit from this 6/7ths refund system.

==== 5% VAT on the purchase of new yachts (Maltese leasing) ====
The process called "Maltese leasing" involves person X purchasing a new yacht through a Maltese company (owned by X), which then leases the yacht to X, before reselling the vessel a few years later to its final owner, who is none other than X. This technique, leasing, has the main advantage of allowing the final owner to pay only 5.4% VAT "against 20% at the normal French rate and 10% with a French or Italian lease", explains Mediapart. These advantages contribute to making the island "the second largest marina in Europe after the United Kingdom, with 4,300 yachts flying its flag", notes Le Monde.

=== Main beneficiaries ===
Several types of beneficiaries were identified by the journalistic investigation. On one hand, multinational corporations seeking to optimize their corporate tax rates, and on the other, high-profile executives or politicians wishing to register their yachts in Malta to benefit from attractive taxation and lower social security contributions on their crew's costs.

==== Companies mentioned in the Malta Files ====
The main beneficiaries of this tax haven within the European Union are reportedly Italians, with 8,000 companies out of the 53,247 registered in Malta. Malta thus allegedly launders money from scams, extortion, and drug trafficking by the Italian Mafia.

Among Germans, several large international groups are implicated in the revelations: BMW, BASF, Deutsche Bank, Puma, Merck, Bosch, Rheinmetall, and Lufthansa. The German airline alone claims 18 subsidiaries registered in Malta.

Among large international groups, IKEA and SICPA are also mentioned, as well as the banks Reyl & Cie (Swiss bank) and JPMorgan.

===== French companies =====
In France, Mediapart's revelations cite Auchan, PSA, and Renault, whose insurance subsidiaries are accused of collecting premiums in Maltese subsidiaries to benefit from the island's fiscal attractiveness. For Auchan, tax optimization allegedly saved €21 million in taxes between 2014 and 2016 via Oney (Auchan's Maltese subsidiary). For PSA and Renault, a cumulative amount of €120 million was avoided. Mediapart highlights the sole employee of RCI Insurance Limited, Renault's Maltese insurance subsidiary, who alone generates €108 million in annual turnover. The same news site also points out the irony of the situation, given that the French state is a shareholder of PSA and Renault.

The insurer April is cited by Mediapart in the Malta Files for having saved €28 million in taxes over eight years on its companies' profits by using tax optimization through several subsidiaries registered in Malta. The first Maltese subsidiary of the April group was registered in 2007. This was April Mediterranean Limited, the holding for April group's Maltese subsidiaries. There is also Axeria Re Limited, the reinsurance subsidiary, as well as Axeria Life International PCC Limited (active from 2008 to 2012), Axeria Insurance Limited (created in 2012), and finally the latest, April Internal Financing Limited, the subsidiary engaged in intra-group financing (a common tax optimization practice). When contacted, the group stated that it "pays its taxes in France on the basis of profits declared in all its French subsidiaries, as required by law and as all companies with French and foreign subsidiaries do."

Also cited are the groups Bouygues and Total.

==== Executives, politicians, and public figures ====
===== In France =====
Among the top executives cited by the European Investigative Collaborations (EIC) media network, France is well-represented (1,291 French citizens cited by Mediapart) with Jean-François Decaux (UK tax resident, owner of the Maltese company Alhoel and head of JCDecaux), Maurice Ricci (founding president of Akka Technologies), Xavier Niel (Iliad), Hubert Martigny (co-founder of Altran), Olivier Bertrand (Groupe Bertrand), and Stéphane Courbit (Lov Group).

===== In Belgium =====
Brigitte Ernst de la Graete, a former Belgian MEP for the Ecolo party, created a Maltese company, Larocca, in December 2013. Its shareholders included relatives of Brigitte Ernst and members of her family. Furthermore, Larocca is linked to companies in other countries considered tax havens: one registered in Luxembourg (SA Campiello) and others in the British Virgin Islands or Panama. This attitude contrasts with the firm stance of her party, which, following the Offshore Leaks, called on the Belgian government for strong measures:

At a time when Belgians are tightening their belts due to austerity policies, these new revelations must push the federal government to get the money where it is, namely from capital income and not from citizens' pockets.

===== The Erdoğan Family =====
The journalists' investigation uncovered a complex financial arrangement (through shell companies in Malta, Pal Shipping Trader One, and the Isle of Man, Bumerz Limited) allegedly showing that the Erdoğan family owned an oil tanker, the Agdash, valued at $20 million.

===== Footballers =====
PSG player Edinson Cavani is another public figure cited in the investigation. The footballer allegedly received his sponsorship income through a Maltese company created in 2014 named "Edicavaniofficial Limited," itself owned by Rocha Holdings Limited, a company 99% owned by Edinson Cavani. According to Mediapart, the financial arrangement allowed Edicavaniofficial Limited to pay only €48,805 in taxes in Malta on the €1.59 million sponsorship contract from Nike.

== Reactions to the Revelations ==
=== Reactions of those Involved ===
Following these Mediapart revelations concerning him, Edinson Cavani initially protested against being publicly highlighted:

In these circumstances, I will not accept that my situation becomes the object of a publicity damaging my image or my reputation, which, given my celebrity, would cause me very serious prejudice

— Edinson Cavani

Subsequently, a defamation lawsuit was filed against Mediapart by Edinson Cavani's lawyers. This lawsuit led to a hearing on 7 November 2017, before the fourteenth correctional chamber of the Tribunal de grande instance of Nanterre. During this hearing, the defense stated that Edinson Cavani had subsequently declared the income from his Maltese companies in France. Cavani's defense produced income tax returns and tax notices for the year 2015 where the amounts of the footballer's image rights were indeed declared in France. While not denying the existence of the Maltese companies where this same income was also taxed: a situation that surprised Mediapart's lawyer, who did not fail to point it out. Edinson Cavani's complaint was dismissed by the Nanterre High Court on 9 January 2018.

Auchan stated that it respects "the international conventions signed between the countries with which this subsidiary operates, and the State of Malta."

PSA stated that the subsidiaries concerned were "validated by the European tax authorities of the various member states."

=== Political reactions in Malta ===
The Prime Minister of Malta, Joseph Muscat, stated that

nothing in the ‘Malta Files’ is secret. To claim that offshore companies exist in Malta is factually incorrect. […] I say we have a competitive system. […] complaints from other countries do not concern the very existence of companies.

Prime Minister Joseph Muscat, whose mandate was challenged by early elections in early June, asked the majority and the opposition to build "a national front" and not to make the Malta Files an issue in the election campaign. In the general election of 3 June 2017, Joseph Muscat was re-elected with 55% of the vote.

=== Political reactions in Europe ===
In France, contacted by Mediapart, the spokesperson for Bruno Le Maire, Minister of Economics and Finance, replied that this tax optimization was legal.

In Germany, the Minister of Finance of North Rhine-Westphalia, Norbert Walter-Borjans, described Malta as the "Panama of Europe."

Mediapart noted that the revelation of the Malta Files was met with discomfort in the media and ignored by political circles, both in France and in Europe.

== Consequences of the Malta Files ==
The European Commissioner for Economic and Monetary Affairs, Pierre Moscovici, sent a request for information in October 2017 regarding a possible incorrect transposition of the European directive on VAT into Maltese law. At issue was the tax scheme allowing only 5.4% VAT to be paid on yachts purchased via leasing by companies registered in Malta, against an official displayed rate of 18%.

In November 2017, another network of investigative journalists, the International Consortium of Investigative Journalists, was the author of revelations known as the Paradise Papers. These confirmed the tax optimization techniques (the Maltese leasing) offered by Malta. They also had consequences.

== Sources of the leaks ==
Two sources are at the origin of the European Investigative Collaborations (EIC) dossier.

A first source provided tens of thousands of documents (emails, contracts, account statements, etc.) from a Maltese fiduciary firm. These sources were obtained by the German daily Der Spiegel. The fiduciary firm involved is Credence.

=== Suspicion of manipulation of sources ===
In a book published in 2017, journalists Pierre Gastineau and Philippe Vasset attempt to shed light on the hidden face of the leaks and explain how they can be exploited by governments. In the case of the Malta Files, for example, the information leaks were prompted by the Maltese government's refusal to supply Russian ships. It would appear that the whistleblower behind the Malta Files was a Russian, close to the country's political leaders, with the aim of disrupting Maltese political power and its prime minister.
