= Glitz =

Glitz may refer to:

- Glitz (novel), a 1985 novel by Elmore Leonard
  - Glitz, a 1988 TV movie based on the novel
- Glitz (TV channel), a lifestyle TV channel for women in Latin America
- TNT Glitz (previously Glitz*), a lifestyle TV channel for women in Germany
- Glitz (website), a French investigative magazine specialized in the luxury sector
