= Rui Pinto =

Portuguese whistleblower (born 1988)

- Born: Rui Pedro Gonçalves Pinto; 20 October 1988 (age 38); Vila Nova de Gaia, Portugal
- Education: University of Porto
- Years active: 2015–2019
- Organization: Football Leaks
- Known for: Illegal computer access
- Criminal charges: Violation of secrecy; illegally accessing information; attempted qualified extortion
- Criminal penalty: Four-year suspended prison sentence (2023)
- Criminal status: Not imprisoned
- Website: footballleaks2015.wordpress.com

Rui Pedro Gonçalves Pinto (born 20 October 1988) is a Portuguese hacker, activist, whistleblower, creator of the Football Leaks website, and responsible for the Malta Files and Luanda Leaks revelations.

Pinto created the Football Leaks website in September 2015, with the intention of revealing the financial picture of association football, including the tax avoidance schemes used by top players and the controversial third-party ownership models used by clubs. He is being accused of having used illegal methods to gather the data he leaked, by accessing private servers and downloading hundreds of internal documents and communications.

Pinto was arrested in Budapest, Hungary, in January 2019 at the request of the Portuguese authorities on suspicion of attempted qualified extortion, violation of secrecy and illegally accessing information. He was released in August 2020.

In July 2023, Pinto was charged for 377 crimes in a new process related to, but not limited to, illegally accessing S.L. Benfica emails and then sharing them with FC Porto's director of communication at the time, Francisco J. Marques, who has been found guilty by court decision of publishing tampered emails on Porto Canal.

== Early life ==
Pinto was born on 20 October 1988 in Vila Nova de Gaia. A keen football fan, he grew up supporting FC Porto. He frequently skipped school to spend time at home on his computer; his high school geography teacher said that "It's very, very difficult to characterize Rui: if he wanted it, he would probably be the best pupil from the class, but he was not". Most of his computer skills are self-taught and he never received any advanced formal education in the field. He began studying history at the University of Porto in the fall of 2008 and enrolled in a study-abroad program in Budapest in 2013. He was alleged to have stolen €300,000 from Cayman Islands-based Caledonian Bank, though he denied any wrongdoing and stated that he challenged the bank in order to show "how the Cayman Islands are largely used for tax evasion and to launder money". He reached an out-of-court settlement with the Caledonian Bank in 2014 and has since refused to comment further on the incident, citing a non-disclosure agreement.

== Football Leaks ==
Pinto returned to Hungary permanently in February 2015 and made money by helping his father's antique business. He maintained an interest in football, computer science and offshore financial flows resulting in tax evasion in the global economy. Later that summer Pinto acquired thousands of internal emails from Doyen Sports Investments, a football agency company backed by Kazakh money. Pinto created the identity of Artem Lobuzov and offered to meet with Nélio Lucas, a players' agent employee of Doyen Sports, to discuss keeping the information secret in exchange for a "good donation". No money changed hands as Pinto broke off contact with Lucas. Pinto later stated that he had tried to meet Lucas in order to verify that the documents he found were real, and confront him with evidence that Lucas may have cooperated in the perpetration of various financial crimes in collusion with other individuals. Some of Pinto's suspicions appears to have been confirmed in the Portuguese criminal case, Operation Prolongamento, in action from 2021. While Nélio Lucas claimed that Pinto had actually been scared off after reading correspondence exchanged with the Portuguese police.

Pinto created the Football Leaks website in September 2015 with the stated aim to reveal "the principal protagonists in the dishonest football industry". Countries including the United Kingdom, Belgium, France and Switzerland have opened criminal investigations based on documents released on the Football Leaks website. Rafael Buschmann, a journalist for German newspaper Der Spiegel, successfully made contact with Pinto in 2016 with the intention of examining the documents he had uncovered and reporting exclusively on the stories in depth. Pinto provided Der Spiegel with four terabytes of confidential information over the next three years. In December 2016, Der Spiegel and other partners at the European Investigative Collaborations (EIC) network (including L'Espresso, Le Soir, NRC Handelsblad, The Romanian Centre for Investigative Journalism / The Black Sea, Mediapart, Politiken, Falter, NewsWeek, El Mundo, The Sunday Times, and Expresso) began working together to investigate documents provided by Pinto in order to publish information about tax avoidance by several football stars. The leaks resulted in multiple footballers being convicted of tax evasion, the Las Vegas police department to investigate an allegation of rape by Cristiano Ronaldo, for Manchester City and Paris Saint-Germain to be investigated for breaking UEFA Financial Fair Play Regulations (FFP) regulations, and also revealed plans from big clubs for the formation of a 'European Super League'. In 2018, Rafael Buschmann released a book, entitled Football Leaks, detailing his role in establishing a working relationship with Pinto.

"The information Football Leaks made public—including player contracts, internal team financial documents and confidential emails—pulled back the curtain on the murky world of soccer finance, led to criminal tax prosecutions of several top players and even helped prompt officials in the United States to reopen a sexual assault investigation involving the Portuguese star Cristiano Ronaldo.

— The New York Times reporter Tariq Panja.

== Luanda Leaks ==
On 19 January 2020, the International Consortium of Investigative Journalists (ICIJ) published a detailed report on how Isabel dos Santos amassed her wealth to become Africa's richest woman. The report – which it called Luanda Leaks – provides evidence of how she "made a fortune at the expense of the Angolan people". Pinto's lawyers claim that he provided the source material for this report. Three days later, dos Santos's personal wealth manager and private banking director Nuno Ribeiro da Cunha was found dead in the garage of his house.

== Manchester City ==
The Football Leaks documents provided to Der Spiegel included internal emails from Manchester City. In November 2018 "Der Spiegel and its European Investigative Collaborations partners reported that the club had disguised the true source of sponsorship in order to comply with UEFA Financial Fair Play Regulations rules. City denied the allegations and said the emails had been obtained illegally and taken out of context. UEFA opened an investigation and in February 2020 banned City from European competition for two seasons and fined it €30 million. In July 2020 the Court of Arbitration for Sport overturned the ban, ruling that the alleged offences were time barred under UEFA's five year limitation period. In February 2023 the Premier League charged City with 115 breaches of its financial rules, covering the period from 2009 to 2018 and a further 35 allegations for failing to cooperate with the investigation. The Premier League has no equivalent limitation period. The case was heard by an independent commission whose hearing concluded in December 2024. In 2026 the Premier League announced that the commission had found City guilty of almost all the charges. Sanction were to be decided at a separate hearing and City said it will appeal.

== Arrest ==
Pinto was identified as the source of Football Leaks by Portuguese magazine Sábado in September 2018. He was arrested in Budapest on 16 January 2019 at the request of the Portuguese authorities for suspicion of attempted qualified extortion, violation of secrecy and illegally accessing information. His lawyers argued that as a whistleblower he was entitled to protection under European law. However he was extradited to Portugal two months later and was charged with 147 crimes by the Public Ministry. Portuguese prosecutors claim that Pinto attempted to extort Doyen Sports for one million euros using the identity of Artem Lobuzov, while Pinto's legal team stated that "the team set up by the Public Prosecution to investigate criminality in the football world seems to be more dedicated to pursuing those who denounce it than investigating those who practice the crimes". His case was taken up by French lawyer William Bourdon, who had previously defended Julian Assange and Edward Snowden.

On 16 April 2019, Pinto was one of the winners of the European whistleblower award promoted by the European United Left (GUE / NGL), along with Julian Assange and Yasmine Motarjemi.

Pinto was released from house arrest on 7 August 2020.

== Trial ==
The trial started on 4 September 2020, surrounded by strong security measures, never seen before in Portugal. In a short statement before the panel of judges, he said he was a whistleblower who made public a lot of important information which would otherwise never be known, and that he never received money.

In several trial sessions, dubious and allegedly criminal acts perpetrated by those in charge of the investigation were identified, having led the panel of judges to make two reports aimed at investigating the conduct of inspectors of the Portuguese Judicial Police.

In September 2023, the Portuguese court gave Pinto a four-year suspended sentence after finding him guilty on counts of attempted extortion, illegal access to data, and breach of correspondence.

== Later developments ==
In April 2026, Pinto was reportedly assaulted in Lisbon while living under the protection of the Polícia Judiciária.

In October 2026, The Guardian reported that Pinto was prepared to assist the UK authorities in their legal case concerning Manchester City in exchange for protection from threats. The report followed a decision by Portugal's Commission for Special Security Programmes to end the witness protection he had received since 2020. His lawyers appealed against the decision. On 9 October, days before his protection was due to end, Portuguese authorities reversed their decision and allowed him additional time to present his case for the extension of his time in witness protection. On 10 November 2026, The Guardian reported that Pinto had been addressed by the Serious Fraud Office, to assist British authorities in their investigations. In exchange he will receive protection.

== In popular culture ==
- A Game of Secrets (2022), documentary about the Football Leaks showing footage of Rui Pinto.

== See also ==
- History of Manchester City F.C. (2001–present)
