= La Lettre =

La Lettre most commonly refers to:

- La Lettre (website), a French investigation website (formerly La Lettre A)
- The Letter (1999 film) (La Lettre in French), a 1999 French-Portuguese drama film
