= History of Manchester City F.C. (2001–present) =

History of an English football club

This page chronicles the history of English football team Manchester City Football Club in further detail from 2001 to the present day. See History of Manchester City F.C. for a history overview of Manchester City.

The 2001 to 2023 history of Manchester City has been marked by stability and then unprecedented success, with the club establishing itself as a Premier League regular since 2002. City was taken over in 2007 by Thaksin Shinawatra, who invested a considerable portion of money into the club with Sven-Göran Eriksson. After being arrested for political corruption in the summer of 2008, Shinawatra had to sell the club to the Abu Dhabi United Group, which ushered in a new era in the history of Manchester City. That new era, however, has had its achievements called into question by recent revelations of fraudulent activity.

== Stability (2001–2008) ==
=== Keegan stability (2001–2005) ===
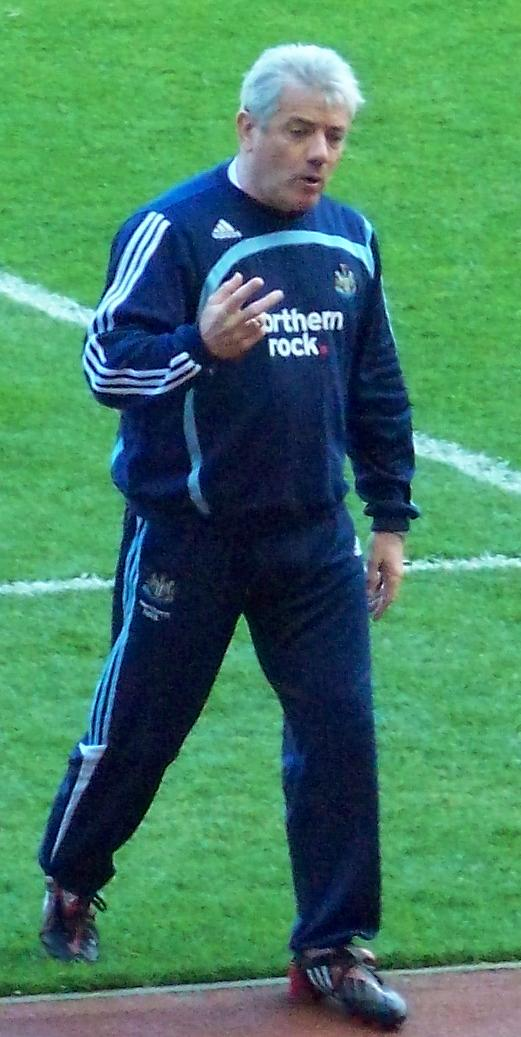
Kevin Keegan oversaw a period of stability albeit one of underachievement

"We could have jumped into the European shake-up, again we couldn't make that leap. That's seven or eight times in a year we could have jumped into something good for this club and we've failed."

— Kevin Keegan's views on his tenure at Manchester City upon resignation

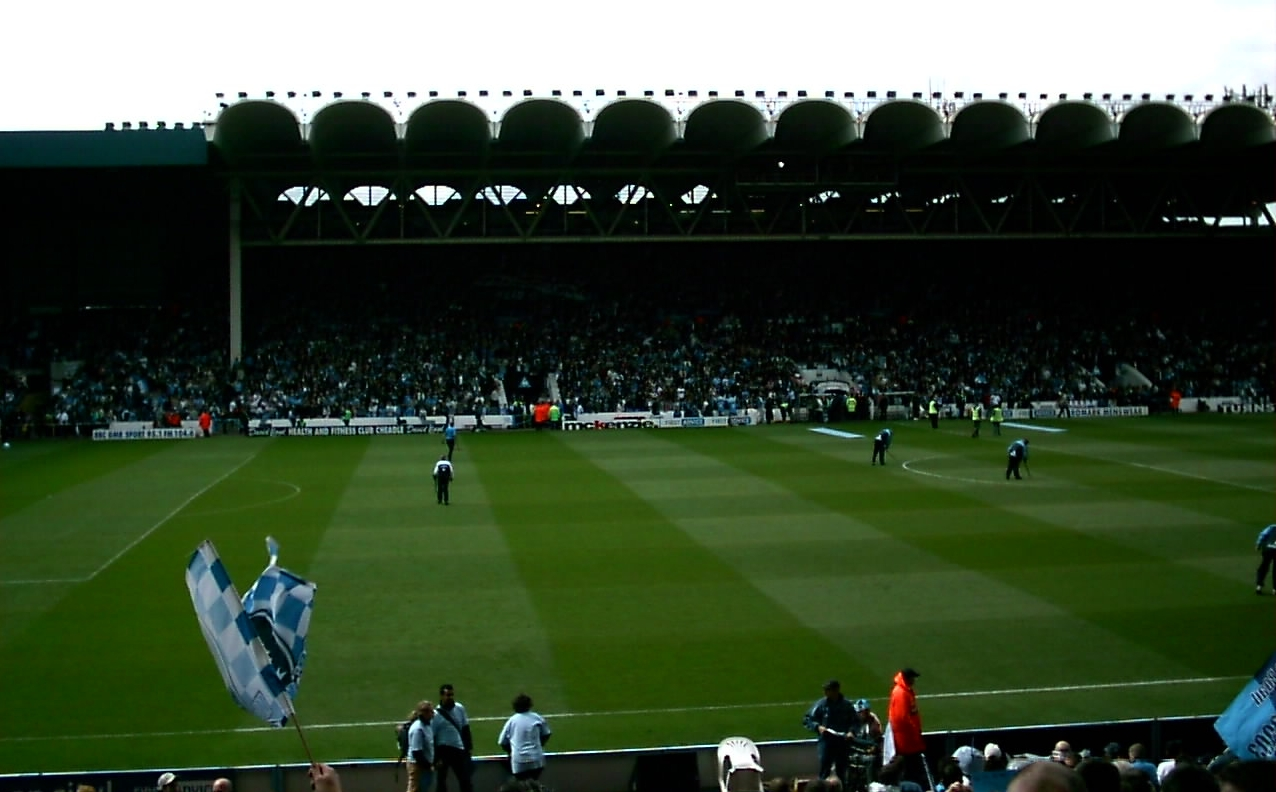
Maine Road pictured on the day of the last match on 11 May 2003

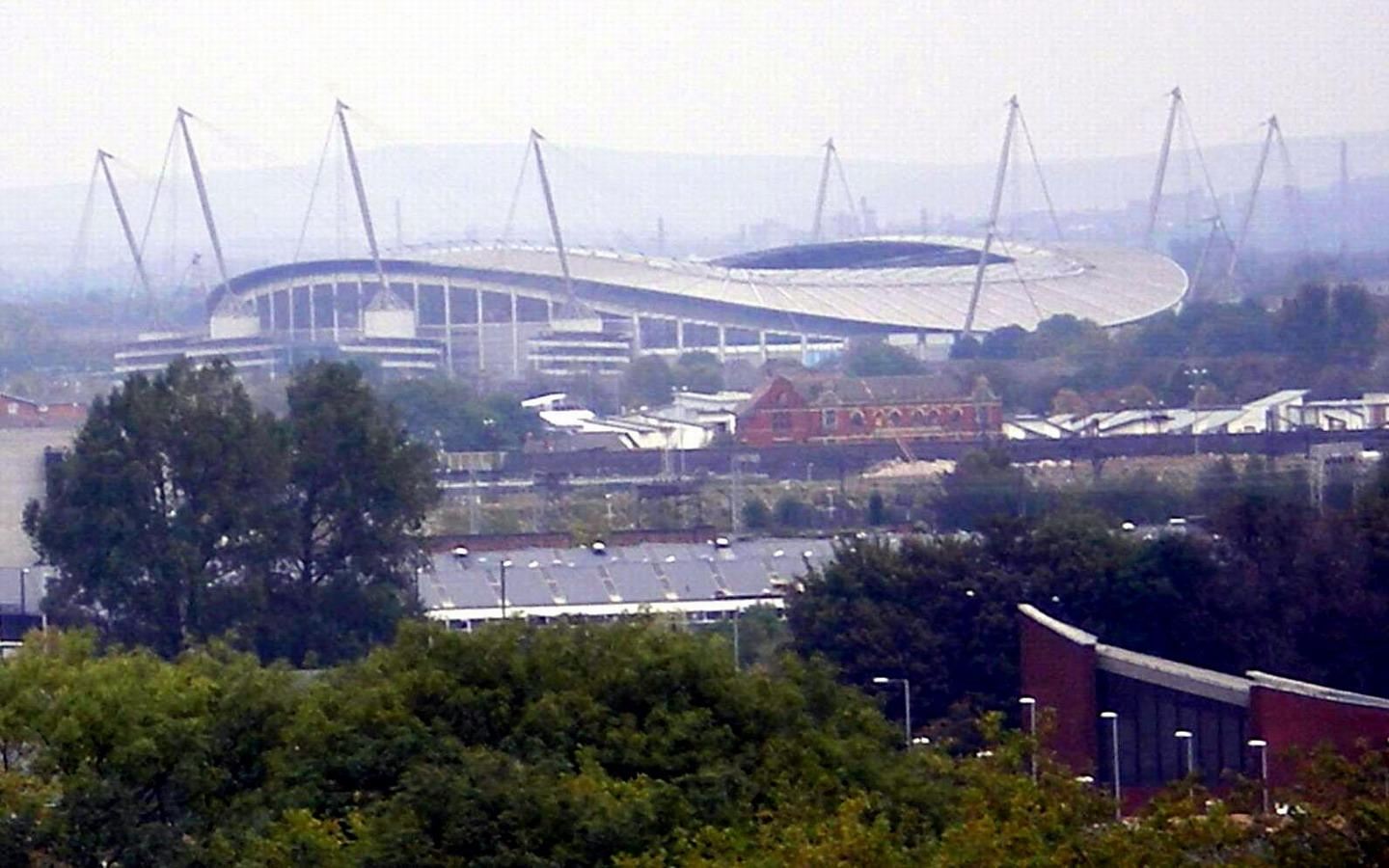
City moved into the City of Manchester Stadium with Eastlands as a preference name, in August 2003

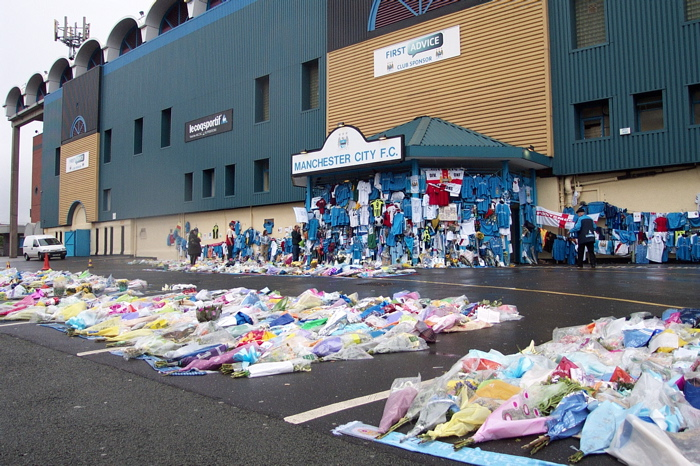
The club were stunned as Marc-Vivien Foé died while playing for Cameroon during the 2003 Confederations Cup. Foé was the last City player to score a goal at Maine Road.

Kevin Keegan's four-year tenure as City manager brought much needed stability, as he gained promotion to the Premier League at the first attempt and then kept the side in the top flight. He failed, however, to build on those positive foundations once they were established in the Premier League.

In his first season in charge, in 2001–02, Keegan brought in several influential players such as Eyal Berkovic, Ali Benarbia and Stuart Pearce. The club went on to win the 2001–02 Division One championship, breaking club records for the number of points gained. Fan favourite Shaun Goater led the club with 30 goals and strike partner Darren Huckerby notched 26 of his own, in a season which convincingly put Manchester City back into English football's elite, with a total of 108 goals scored in 46 league games.

In preparation for his second season as manager (2002–03), he signed Nicolas Anelka, Peter Schmeichel and Marc-Vivien Foé. That season saw City win against Liverpool at Anfield and take four points from Manchester United, but concede five goals away to Chelsea and at home to Arsenal, securing their Premier League status by finishing ninth. Keegan also guided City into the UEFA Cup, qualifying via the UEFA Fair Play ranking. 2002–03 was also City's last season at Maine Road, which the Club left after 80 years to relocate to the 48,000-seat City of Manchester Stadium, originally built to host the 2002 Commonwealth Games.

The club and their supporters were stunned when Marc-Vivien Foé, a player who had been on loan in the previous season to Manchester City and was arguably one of City's best players of the season, died while playing for Cameroon during the 2003 FIFA Confederations Cup in a match against Colombia. In the 72nd minute of the match, Foé collapsed in the centre circle, with no other players near him. After attempts to resuscitate him on the pitch, he was stretchered off the field, where he received mouth-to-mouth resuscitation and oxygen. Medics spent 45 minutes attempting to restart his heart, and although he was still alive upon arrival at the stadium's medical centre he died shortly afterwards, in spite of the efforts to save his life.

Despite having signed four new players in Steve McManaman, Paul Bosvelt, David Seaman and Michael Tarnat, 2003–04 was a difficult season for City. They were in with a slight chance of relegation up to the penultimate game of the season, finishing 16th in the table with a goal difference of +1. Nonetheless, the season had some high points, with City defeating Tottenham Hotspur at White Hart Lane after being down 3–0 at half-time during an FA Cup replay, with their match prospects worsened after Joey Barton was sent-off on the brink of the interval. City, however, pulled off one of the greatest FA comebacks of all time, scoring four second-half goals from Sylvain Distin, Paul Bosvelt, Shaun Wright-Phillips and a headed winner by Jon Macken to seal a famous victory. There was also a 4–1 humbling of rivals Manchester United at Eastlands. In the UEFA Cup campaign, the Blues reached the second round, being eliminated on the away goals rule.

City again disappointed in cup competitions in the 2004–05 season, with a defeat by Oldham Athletic in the FA Cup and a loss to a typical reserve Arsenal team normally seen in the League Cup by manager Arsène Wenger. Later in the season, in March 2005, Keegan quit as manager with immediate effect, 15 months before his expected retirement. Keegan remarked after resigning, "We could have jumped into the European shake-up, again we couldn't make that leap. That's seven or eight times in a year we could have jumped into something good for this club and we've failed."

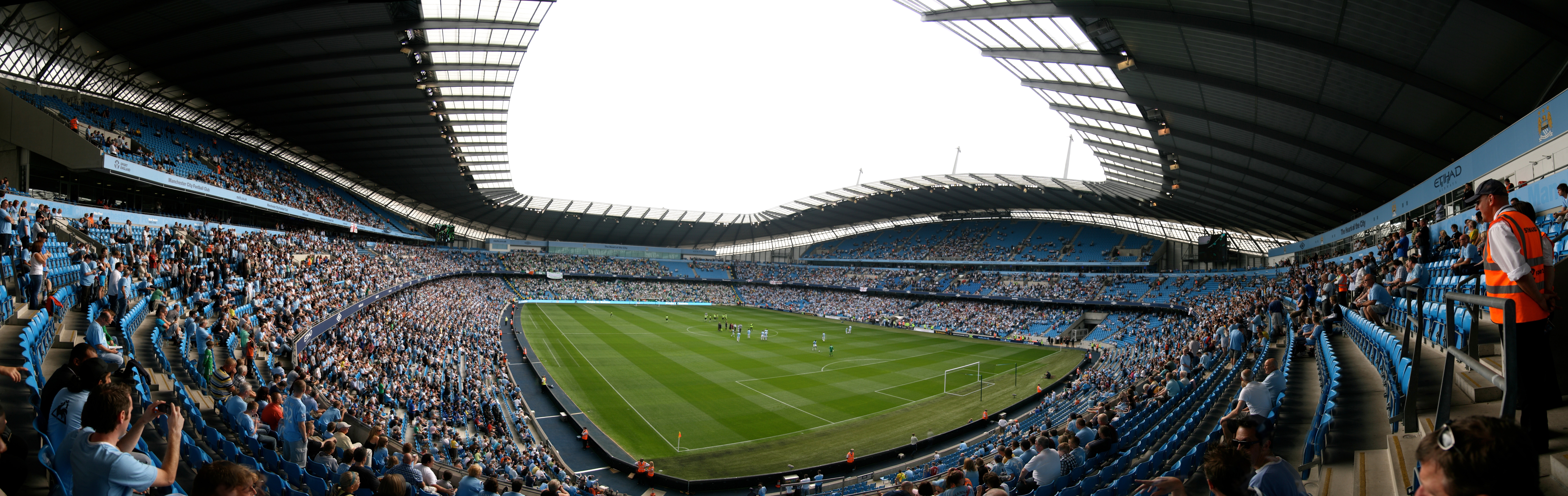
City moved into the City of Manchester Stadium in 2003 at a cost of £50M plus an approximate £2M-per-season payment

=== Stuart Pearce years (2005–2007) ===
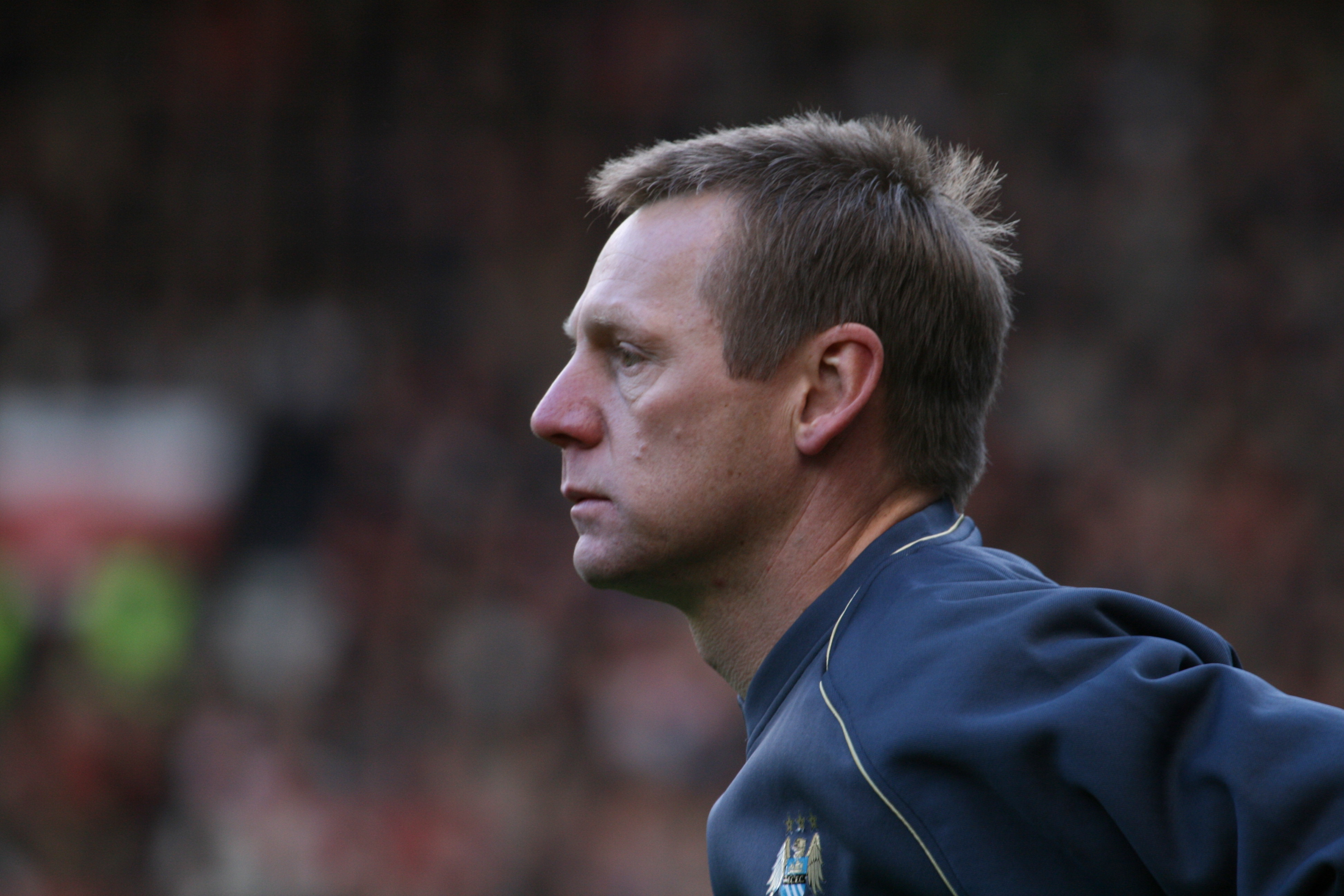
Stuart Pearce was manager between 2005 and 2007

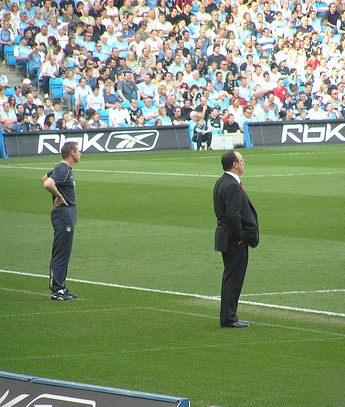
Pearce (left) in 2007 along former Liverpool manager Rafa Benítez

In March 2005, one of Keegan's coaches, Stuart Pearce, was appointed caretaker of City after Keegan left the club. After a successful run of form which put the club close to UEFA Cup qualification, Pearce was given the job on a permanent basis. The final match of the season against Middlesbrough was remembered for Pearce's decision to bring on goalkeeper Nicky Weaver for outfield midfielder Claudio Reyna during the latter stages of the game so that 6 ft 5ins David James could play upfront, despite having £5 million striker Jon Macken on the bench. City even had a David James number 1 outfield shirt ready if such action was deemed necessary. The ploy was somewhat successful, with James proving difficult to deal with. Franck Queudrue eventually committed a handball in his own penalty area to give City a last minute penalty, but Robbie Fowler missed his kick, squandering City's opportunity to reach Europe; the game finished 1–1.

Despite a successful start to the 2005–06 season, Manchester City finished 15th in the Premiership after losing nine of its last ten games. They were also eliminated from the League Cup by League One side Doncaster Rovers. Pearce developed the reputation as being unusually fair and honest by refusing to criticise referees for mistakes they may have made. He was also touted as a potential successor for England manager Sven-Göran Eriksson in the early stages of the season when City were impressing.

Pearce failed to bring about an improvement in the 2006–07 season which saw City skirmish with relegation and the season would prove tough for the club. The club were again eliminated from the League Cup by a League One team, Chesterfield, early on in the season. Ben Thatcher's elbow challenge on Pedro Mendes while playing Portsmouth shocked many – a challenge which prompted City to take unprecedented action and banned Thatcher for six matches by the club and a six weeks fine. Pearce called the challenge "indefensible" and The Football Association (FA) banned Thatcher for a further eight matches.

The side scored just ten goals at home in the league, and none after New Year's Day in 2007, a record low in top-flight English football. Pearce was sacked at the end of the season in May 2007 and another period of transition at the club was about an unravel off the pitch during the summer.

== Thaksin Shinawatra ownership ==
=== 2007–08 season ===
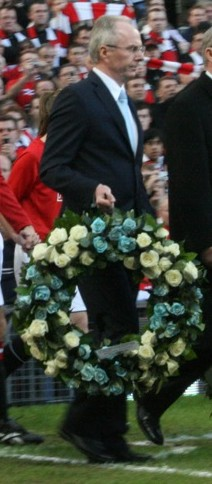
Sven-Göran Eriksson was Manchester City manager from July 2007 to June 2008

In December 2006, the club issued a statement regarding a possible takeover, prompting press speculation about potential buyers. On 24 April, former Manchester City player Ray Ranson announced interest in making an offer for the club, though the club denied press reports that a bid had been made. On 1 May 2007, it was announced that former Thai prime minister Thaksin Shinawatra had been granted access to the club's accounts. The deal, however, was thrown into doubt when Thailand's military junta froze £830 million of Shinawatra's assets after they investigated allegations of corruption made against him.

On 21 June, the Manchester City board accepted an £81.6 million offer for the club from Thaksin Shinawatra and advised the shareholders to accept the bid. On 6 July, Thaksin finally acquired a 75% share in the club, enough to take full control of the club and delist it as full owner. One of his first moves was to schedule a press conference to announce former England manager Sven-Göran Eriksson as the club's new manager, Eriksson's first job since leaving international duty.

Eriksson spent approximately £45 million before the 2007–08 season, though his signings had mixed success. He purchased Martin Petrov for £4.7 million, Gélson Fernandes, Rolando Bianchi for £8.8 million injury-prone Valeri Bojinov, Javier Garrido, Brazilian Elano, Geovanni on a free transfer and Felipe Caicedo, with Benjani also joining in the January transfer window.

Under Eriksson, they made a positive start to the season. City's form in the second half of the season, however, was weak: they finished ninth in the final table, but nonetheless finished with their highest-ever Premier League points total, including double victories over rivals Manchester United. The season was tainted with typical City performances, including a 6–0 mauling against Chelsea at Stamford Bridge early in the season and a last day 8–1 defeat by Middlesbrough, a beleaguered performance which was overshadowed by the incessant rumours about Eriksson's future at the club.

Months of speculation began in March 2008, as the season drew to a close, over Eriksson's future. City fans launched a "Save our Sven (SOS)" campaign to prevent his sacking, but this was to no avail after Eriksson's one-year reign as manager ended on 2 June 2008.

=== Mark Hughes appointment and financial disarray (Summer 2008) ===
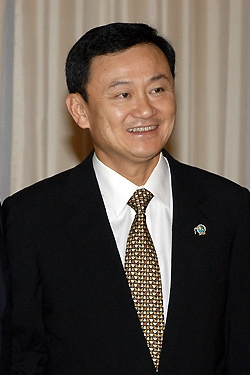
Controversial former owner Thaksin Shinawatra who later sold the club after his financial assets were frozen

On 5 June 2008, Mark Hughes was unveiled as City's new manager on a three-year contract. The former Manchester United striker had been manager of the Welsh national side for five years before spending four seasons at Blackburn Rovers, achieving UEFA Cup qualification twice and reaching two FA Cup semi-finals.

That "firepower" being transfer money trickled out slowly, with Hughes re-signing Shaun Wright-Phillips from Chelsea the poorly-judged signing of Tal Ben Haim likewise from Chelsea and Vincent Kompany, who would later prove to be one of City's shrewdest buys of recent years, joining for £5 million from Hamburger SV. The appointment of Hughes as manager placed a veil over Thaksin Shinawatra's troubles with the Thai authorities: he now had his £800 million fortune frozen in Thailand, and he did not wish to return to Thailand to clear his name.

Throughout August 2008, media outlets claimed that the club was in complete disarray and that City were on the brink of financial meltdown, with Shinawatra asking a now disillusioned former chairman John Wardle for a £2 million loan and new manager Hughes threatening to resign unless finance problems were sorted out and the board stopped trying to seemingly sell Stephen Ireland and Vedran Ćorluka behind his back. City supporters were also growing restless with Shinawatra – supporters who had seen many false dawns in their lifetimes, the situation looked bleak and an "out with Shinawatra" tone was beginning to gain favour with some City fans, much in the same manner of Peter Swales' departure in 1994. Rumours began spreading throughout the footballing world in August 2008 that Shinawatra's position as owner of the club was just not viable because of his frozen financial backing, and it was believed he was considering selling Manchester City to a new owner(s), claims which were refuted by club and manager at the time. Hughes, however, later acknowledged after Shinawatra left that he was "close" to leaving City because of the "confusion" at the club, further saying, "the reality wasn't exactly what was described and sold to me" when talking about Shinawatra's broken promises when he signed on for the job.

The dream of bringing back the glory era to City, set out by Shinawatra just a year before, now seemed in doubt.

== Revolution (2008–present) ==
=== Takeover (September 2008) ===
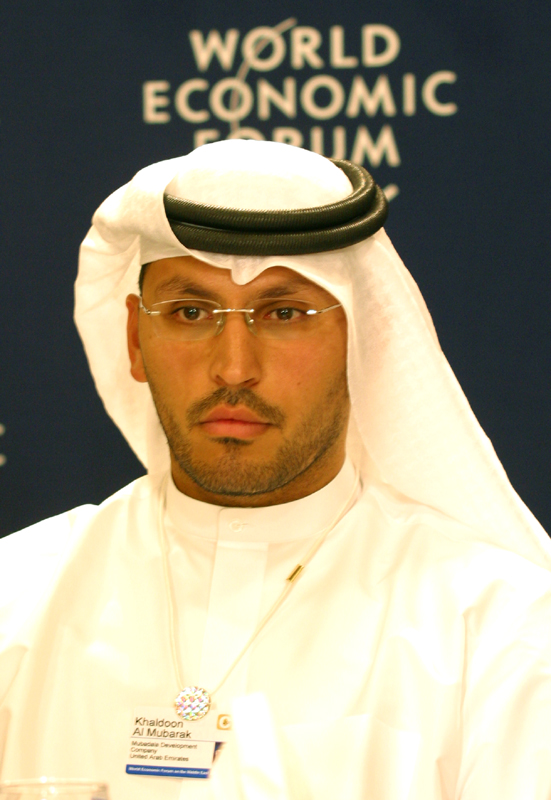
Khaldoon Al Mubarak, an experienced businessman in Abu Dhabi was appointed chairman on Sheikh Mansour's behalf

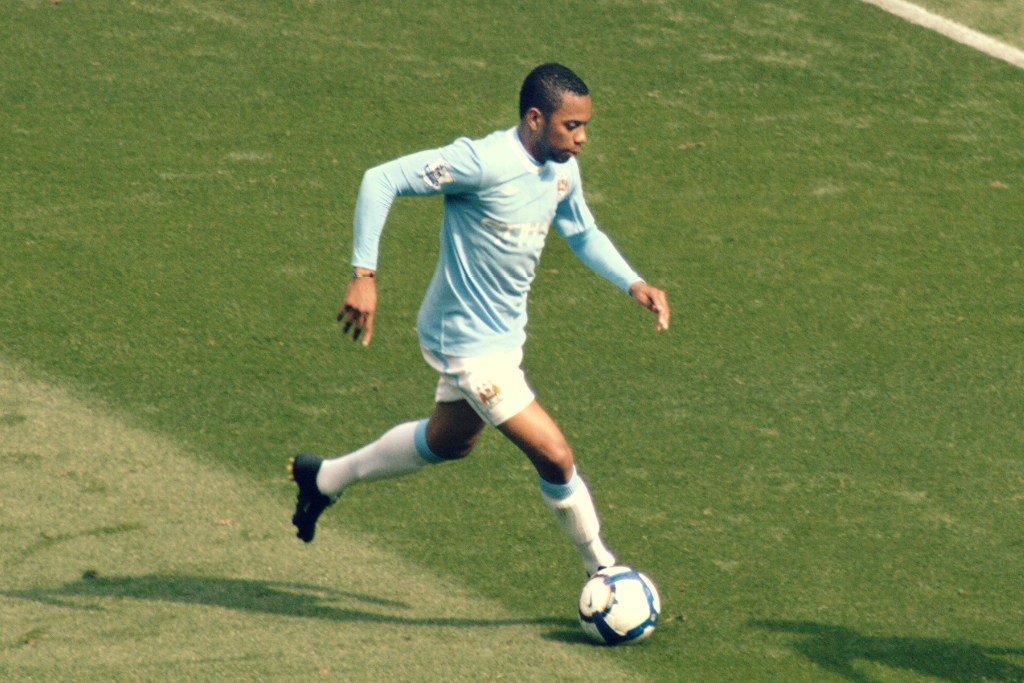
Robinho sensationally signed hours before the transfer deadline for a British transfer record fee, his spell at City was characterised by inconsistency

"I am a football fan, and I hope that you will soon see that I am now also a Manchester City fan. But I am also a long-term investor and that is probably more important to the club and to you because it means we are here for the long haul and that we will act always in the best interests of the club and all of its stakeholders, but especially you the fans."

— Manchester City Sheikh Mansour addresses Manchester City supporters in a letter soon after the takeover

As August drew to a close and the summer transfer deadline was imminent, Shinawatra struck a late takeover deal on deadline day with an, at the time, mostly unknown Arab consortium called the Abu Dhabi United Group.

On the day of the takeover, the club tried to sensationally sign Dimitar Berbatov from under the noses of rivals Manchester United. News broke in the late evening on 1 September 2008 that the club was nearing a deal for Real Madrid's Robinho for a British record transfer fee of £32.5 million, beating rivals Chelsea, who were poised to sign him for his services. Robinho did sporadically have impressive games for City, though his inability to maintain consistency and adapt to the physical English game hindered his progress and he later became a peripheral figure during his two-year spell at the club. City also made deadline day bids for star strikers David Villa and Mario Gómez of Valencia and Bayern Munich respectively.

A degree of uncertainty surrounded the takeover, which itself was first believed to be a takeover by a group of wealthy Arab businessman, with Sulaiman Al Fahim leading the group. However, it soon became apparent in the days after the takeover that it was led by Sheikh Mansour, who is worth at least £17 billion and possesses an estimated family fortune of US$1 trillion, making him the richest owner in world football.

Meanwhile, Sulaiman Al Fahim was swiftly relieved of his role as publicity figure after the takeover, one such example of his conduct being his discussion of a £134 million bid for Manchester United's Cristiano Ronaldo: "Ronaldo has said he wants to play for the biggest club in the world, so we will see in January [transfer window] if he is serious."

=== Hughes year (July 2008 – Christmas 2009) ===
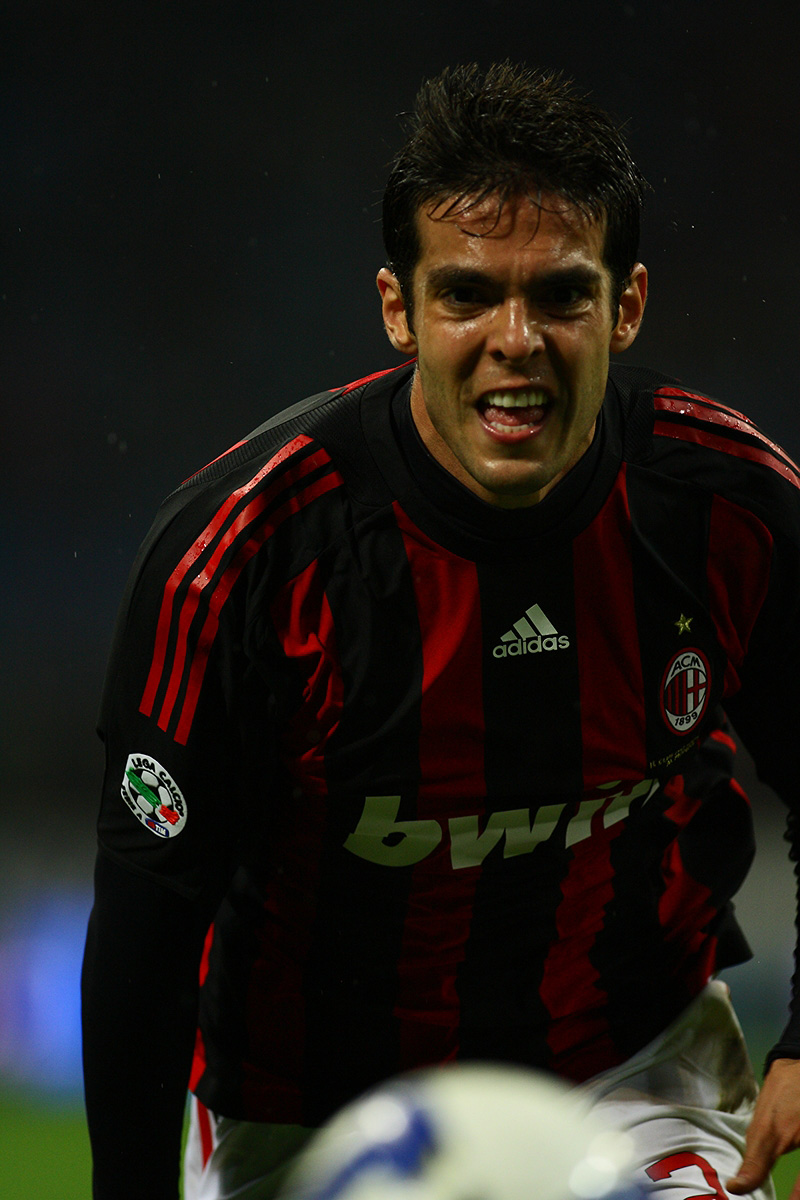
Manchester City shook the football world after media outlets claimed that they planned to make a world record bid to sign the then-Milan playmaker, Kaká

Hughes' first season was a model of inconsistency. Easy victories against West Ham United, Sunderland, Portsmouth, Stoke City and Arsenal were paired with disappointing defeats, mainly away from home. Good form at the end of the season meant that City challenged for seventh place, though a defeat at Tottenham in the penultimate game of the season ended their challenge. Domestic Cup competitions show further unpredictable form: they were defeated in the League Cup Second round to Brighton & Hove Albion of League One on penalties, while in the FA Cup, City faced Nottingham Forest at home in the third round proper, losing 3–0. The middle of the season was overshadowed by the club's ambitious attempts to purchase Milan attacking midfielder Kaká. The saga shook world football and media reports suggested a transfer fee in the region of £100 million was offered to Milan. The move, however, ultimately broke down, with Manchester City CEO Garry Cook claiming Milan had "bottled it". The Kaká transfer saga was perhaps embarrassing – but importantly, City had announced their future intentions within months of their new ambitious owners at the helm on a world stage. Arguably the shining light of the season was the UEFA Cup, in which City fared well, playing in more matches than any other team in the competition due to their early Fair Play start. They were eventually eliminated in the quarter-finals by Hamburger SV, 4–3 on aggregate. Overall, City finished tenth in the Premier League.

In the summer transfer window of 2009, the first full summer transfer period Hughes had to spend the owner's millions, Hughes decided to bolster his team, signing Roque Santa Cruz from Blackburn Rovers, Gareth Barry from Aston Villa, and both Emmanuel Adebayor and Kolo Touré from Arsenal. The club also eventually completed the prolonged signing of Joleon Lescott from Everton.

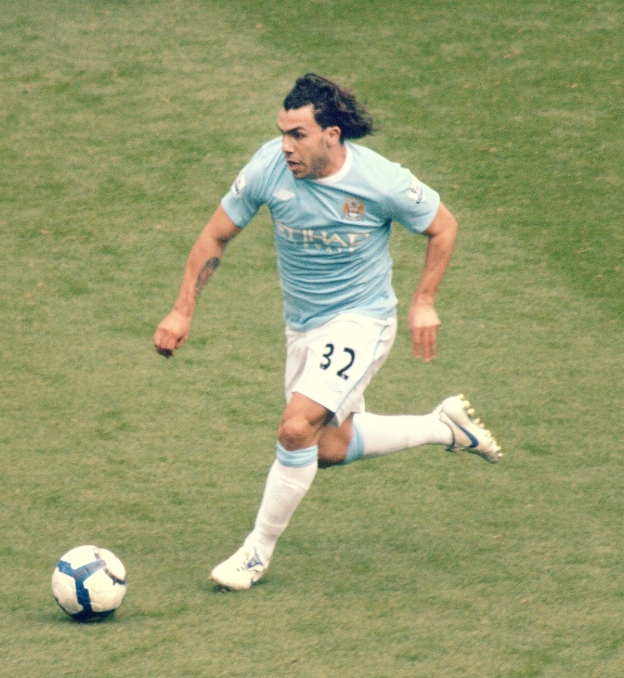
Carlos Tevez in action for Manchester City, a 2009 transfer coup for the club – Tevez would later become top scorer in the 2009–10 season for the club

The club also achieved a major transfer coup with the acquisition of Carlos Tevez from rivals Manchester United, a player whom United fans had urged manager Sir Alex Ferguson to sign with chants of, "Fergie, Fergie, sign him up!". The club commissioned a witty "Welcome to Manchester" billboard based at the end of Deansgate in Manchester city centre. The poster provoked an angry Ferguson to claim City are "a small club with a small mentality", and talked about how he did not see them as a threat, though he later retracted his opinion in January 2010. Some media outlets perceived Ferguson's attack may have been down to the growing fact that City were on the verge of consistently challenging for honours for the first time in his tenure at United.

City made a strong start to the season, beating Blackburn Rovers 2–0 on opening day, followed by a win against Barcelona at an at-capacity Camp Nou in the (non-competitive) Joan Gamper Trophy. City continued their unbeaten run by beating Wolverhampton Wanderers 1–0 at Eastlands the following weekend.

However, a run of just two victories in eleven games for Hughes' side saw City fail to capitalise on their early season form, and the burden of pressure on Hughes began to grow considerably. On 19 December 2009, only hours after a 4–3 win over Sunderland, Hughes was sacked, despite the club sitting in sixth in the league and having only lost twice. The Italian Roberto Mancini, formerly of Inter Milan, was appointed his successor. Rumours had begun floating around early on Saturday amongst the media, prior to the game, that Hughes would lose his job, notwithstanding the Sunderland result.

The swift manner in which Hughes had been sacked and replaced after just winning a match was decried by some media outlets. Some in the press disagreed, but many rated Hughes as the best young British manager and had viewed him as the ideal choice to build a Manchester City winning dynasty. Despite this, Mancini is a year younger and possessed the experience of winning silverware and the ability to build a team, something he did successfully at Inter.

Mancini had also been linked for manager's position 11 months prior.

=== Mancini era (2009–2013) ===
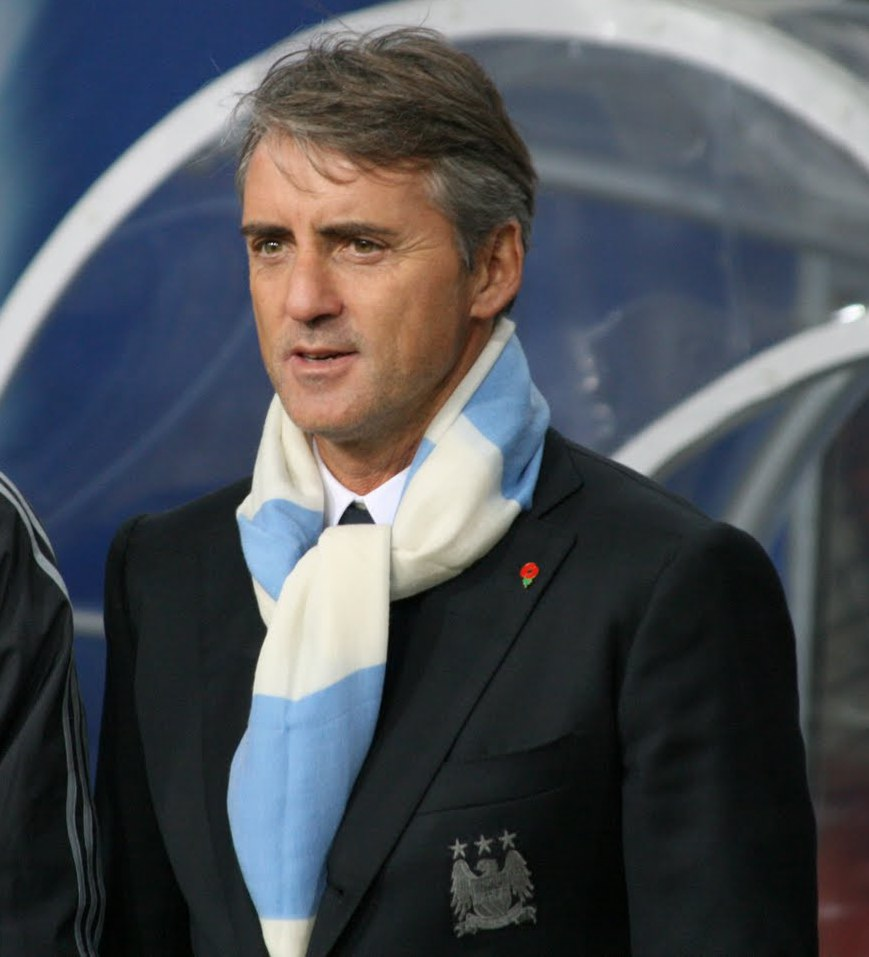
Manchester City manager Roberto Mancini from December 2009 to May 2013 who laid the foundations for a successful era

In his 21 Premier League games in the second half of the season, Mancini won eleven and drew six, guiding City to fifth place in the final league table – their highest finish since 1992 – and earning UEFA Europa League qualification. Soon after the season ended, club chairman Khaldoon Al Mubarak confirmed in an interview that Mancini's job was safe despite the club missing out on Champions League qualification after being beaten 1–0 by Tottenham. The season was viewed as a sign of progress after a League Cup semi-final and a number of promising performances, notably the 4–2 win against league leaders Chelsea at Stamford Bridge and impressive consecutive 6–1 and 5–1 wins against Burnley away and Birmingham City at Eastlands.

Before the 2010–11 season, Mancini, with support from his chairman and financial support from the owner, had the opportunity in the summer to build his squad for the upcoming season. Mancini embarked on a summer spending spree, signing Jérôme Boateng from Hamburger SV, David Silva from Valencia, Yaya Touré from Barcelona, Aleksandar Kolarov from Lazio, Mario Balotelli from Inter Milan and James Milner from Aston Villa. However, the club also let fan favourite Craig Bellamy leave on loan for Cardiff City after a rumoured fractious relationship with Mancini. 2008 signing Robinho also left, joining Milan on transfer deadline day for an estimated £22 million, £10 million less than what City bought him for from Real Madrid.

After an inconsistent pre-season, City drew their first Premier League match 0–0 with Tottenham at White Hart Lane – an improved performance in the second half after a shaky first 45 minutes gave City a point against one of their "bogey teams". The club made a decent start to the season and beat Liverpool 3–0, but lost 1–0 to Sunderland after Carlos Tevez missed an open goal in the first half, leaving City on four points after the first three Premier League games of the season.

Mancini season record
Season	League	FA Cup	League Cup	Europe
2009–10	5th	R5	SF	DNQ
2010–11	3rd	Winners	R3	Europa League R16
2011–12	1st	R3	SF	Champions League GS; Europa League R16
2012–13	2nd	Runners-up	R3	Champions League GS

The club season was curtailed for two weeks for the international break of qualifiers for Euro 2012 and there was a degree of pride around Eastlands that despite all the money spent, the club were still very keen on investing in English footballers, a nation of footballers that some believe the Premier League is hindering England's progress on the international stage with too many foreign players. During the match against Switzerland on 7 September, England fielded four Manchester City players from the start – Joe Hart, Joleon Lescott, Gareth Barry and James Milner. By the end of the match, England were fielding six City players after the inclusion of Adam Johnson and Shaun Wright-Phillips. Only a few other teams in the history of football can claim to have such a numerical influence in the England national team, with City joining Herbert Chapman's 1930s Arsenal's side, Bob Paisley's Liverpool team in the 1970s and Alex Ferguson's early 2000s Manchester United side.

By the middle of October, City were second in the league, two points behind leaders Chelsea and three points ahead of rivals Arsenal, Manchester United and Tottenham. Three wins against Newcastle United, Blackpool and Lech Poznań in the Europa League had put City in a good position. A spell of bad form developed, however, as City suffered consecutive league defeats against Arsenal and Wolverhampton Wanderers, as well as a 3–1 away defeat against Lech Poznań, the first time Roberto Mancini had lost three matches on the bounce; this sparked erroneous speculation that Mancini could be sacked.

City then embarked on a nine-match unbeaten run from early November after the Europa League loss against Lech Poznań to 20 December. The unbeaten run started with two goalless home draws against Manchester United and Birmingham City, in which Mancini was pinpointed in the media for his "defensive" tactics. In response to media criticism, however, a good portion of Manchester City supporters personally backed Mancini with the chant, "He comes from Italy, to manage Man City, Mancini! Ohhhh! Mancini! Ohhhh!," which became commonplace (particularly at away matches) in response to what some Manchester City fans saw as an anti-City agenda and an attempt to undermine the club and manager by the national media. The two draws, were interjected by a 2–0 win at West Bromwich Albion and an impressive 4–1 victory at Craven Cottage against Fulham. A last-minute equaliser at the Britannia robbed City of three points against Stoke City but was followed up by a 3–0 win against Red Bull Salzburg which secured City's progression into the knockout phase of the cup. And City racked up another win against Bolton Wanderers, putting them in fourth in the Premier League, and only three points behind league leaders Manchester United. A 3–1 win followed at Upton Park against a struggling West Ham team and a 1–1 draw in Turin against Juventus in the Europa League preserved City's nine-match unbeaten period, and sealed progress to the knockout phase of the Europa League as group winners. During this nine-match period, City had scored 15 goals and had only conceded four goals.

On 12 December 2010, Carlos Tevez made a transfer request notifying the club of his intention to leave in the January transfer window, citing homesickness from being away from his family in Argentina. Journalists reported that City's recent form was excellent and had been gradually sneaking up the table to catch up with the leaders, so much so it seemed inevitable that an incident in the vein of typical City would occur soon. The club appeared to blame the player's advisor(s) in a statement, believed to Kia Joorabchian, for influencing Tevez's decision, while Tevez reiterated his intention to leave, calling the situation "regrettable". Despite this, Mancini displayed initial confidence about Tevez staying in the days after his transfer request, and on 20 December, before the Everton game that evening, the club confirmed Tevez had withdrawn his transfer request and committed his future to the club after talks.

The team's nine-match unbeaten run came to an end on 20 December against Everton at home, in which they lost 2–1 after a sluggish start in the match conceding twice in the opening 20 minutes and consequently City missed the chance to top the league at Christmas for the first time since 1929. Two wins against Newcastle away and Aston Villa at home followed, 3–1 and 4–0 respectively, placing City joint top on points with Manchester United.

In the New Year, the club struggled in the league with emphasis appearing to have turned to the FA Cup and Europa League, but maintained their position of fourth, which they occupied throughout the majority of the season. City successfully beat Aris 3–0 and progressed to the last 16 to play Dynamo Kyiv. However, the Blues lost the first leg 2–0 away and won the return leg 1–0, meaning they lost the tie 2–1 on aggregate, thus bringing to an end City's Europa League campaign.

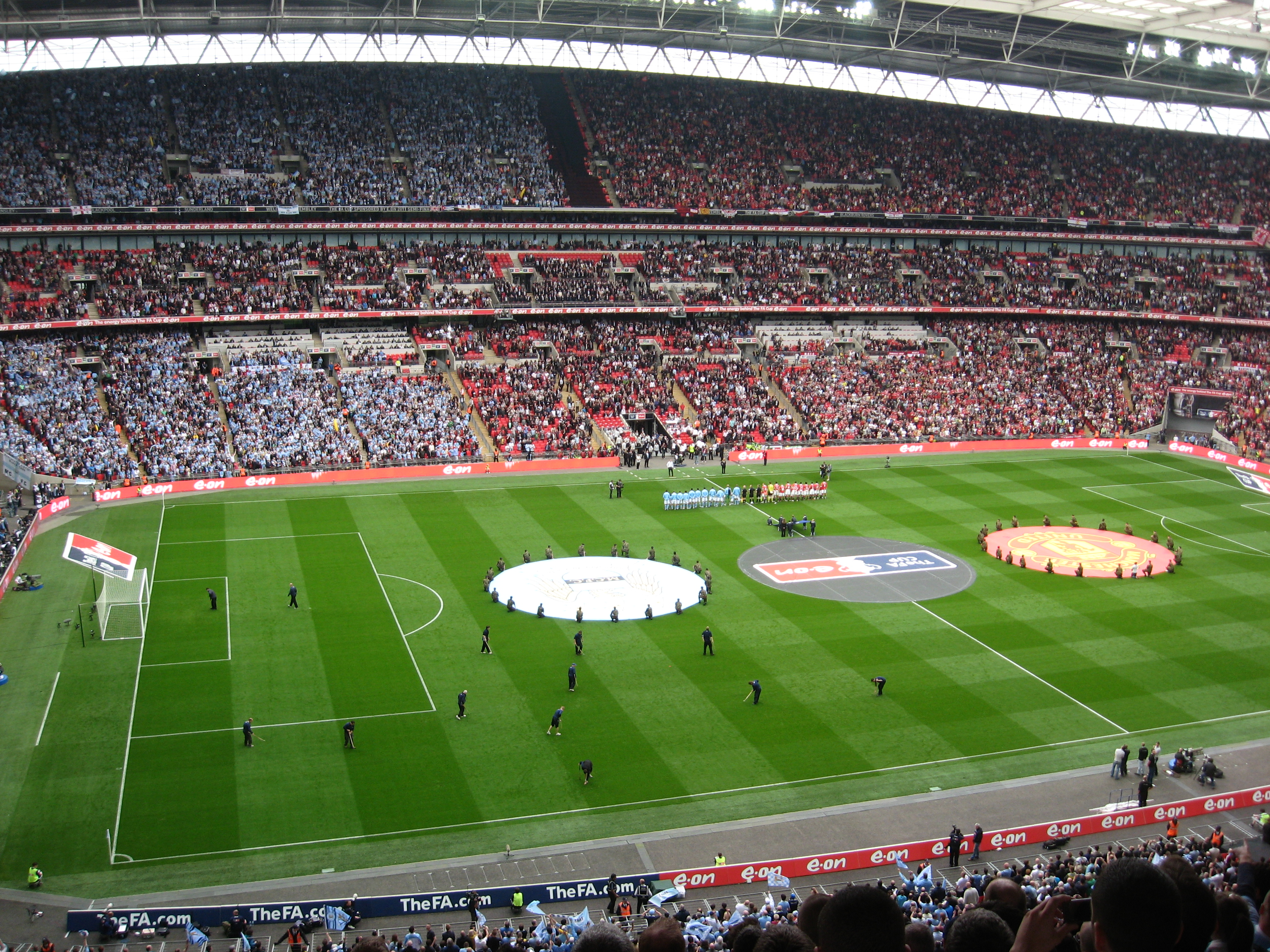
Wembley pictured before the 2011 FA Cup semi-final – only the second FA Cup semi-final between Man City and Man United and the first ever meeting at Wembley. City emerged victorious through a 52nd-minute goal from Yaya Touré

The club, however, embarked on a strong FA Cup run, albeit with two replays. They surpassed Leicester City 4–2, Notts County 5–0, Aston Villa 3–0 and Reading 1–0 – all at home – and consequently made it to an FA Cup semi-final, where they were drawn against rivals Manchester United. It was the first time both teams had met at Wembley, new or old, and the second time they had met in the FA Cup semi-final, with City beating United 3–0 in 1926. Over 86,000 packed Wembley to watch the match with a further 9.5 million watching on TV – nearly half the viewing audience at the time – during the last 15 minutes of the game. United controlled the first 30 minutes with striker Dimitar Berbatov having a one-on-one shot with City goalkeeper Joe Hart saved and seconds later missed from only a few yards out having spooned his shot over the bar, while Nemanja Vidić headed wide from a pinpoint corner. From the 30th minute, however, City started to come into the game, with a fierce shot from Mario Balotelli saved, a Vincent Kompany shot narrowly missing the target and Joleon Lescott wastefully volleying over from a corner having been in space; City went into the half-time interval with cause for optimism. Roared on by their supporters, City continued the momentum they had generated before the break, with the breakthrough coming in the 52nd minute after Yaya Touré caught central midfielder Michael Carrick unaware, pouncing on a sluggish pass, sliding the ball past Vidić and then through goalkeeper Edwin van der Sar's legs to make the score 1–0. From then on, City had found confidence, controlling the game with some new-found aplomb, limiting United to one opportunity which provoked a strong save from a deflected Nani free-kick. Paul Scholes was later sent off in the 72nd minute after his studs speared into Pablo Zabaleta's right thigh, and the match ultimately finished in a 1–0 City victory, ensuring progression to the FA Cup final. On 10 May, Champions League qualification was secured with a 1–0 win over Tottenham, in which an own goal from Peter Crouch secured the win. A 1–0 win over Stoke on 14 May 2011 secured their fifth FA Cup. The result gave City their first major trophy in 35 years, with Mancini dedicating the victory to the long-suffering supporters and urged his team to use the win to provide impetus for achieving greater success.

Fresh from their successful 2010–11 season, City began the new league season in imperious form, breaking a number of Premier League records. City won their seven out of their eight league matches at the start of the season, with a 2–2 draw in between this run. The magnitude of the victories surprised many: 4–0 against Swansea City at home, 5–1 against Tottenham away, 4–0 against Blackburn away and 4–1 against Aston Villa at home.

However, the magnitude of victory in the ninth league match against Manchester United in October 2011 surprised many more. Before the match, City were on 22 points and United close behind at 20. Some believed that this would be a season which would be contested between the two Manchester clubs, as Arsenal were in poor form and Chelsea appeared in transition under new manager André Villas-Boas. The match therefore carried great importance in the title race, but the scoreline proved to be a mismatch: City defeated United away at Old Trafford 6–1. United had not lost a home match since April 2010, it was also their heaviest defeat in Premier League, worst loss at Old Trafford since 1955 and the first time conceded six at home since 1930. United manager Alex Ferguson called it his "worst ever day" and "the worst result in my history, ever".

By the end of the Demolition Derby, Manchester City fans were convulsed with joy, revelling in the sight of the majestic David Silva putting the champions to the sword, serenading Sir Alex Ferguson with "getting sacked in the morning" and designing their "Six and the City" T-shirts. Incredible.

— Henry Winter, The Daily Telegraph's football reporter,

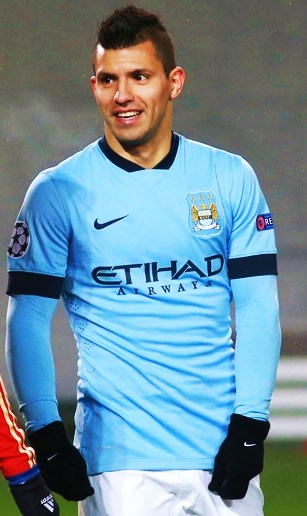
Sergio Agüero in a Champions League match against CSKA Moscow

On 13 May 2012, the final day of the season, City and United were level on 86 points, though City had the superior goal difference by 8. City faced Queens Park Rangers and United faced Sunderland. With five minutes added to the total of 90 minutes, and QPR having a lead of 2–1 with ten men (having had Joey Barton sent off by referee Mike Dean for violent conduct), most of City fans lost their hopes since United were leading against Sunderland at the Stadium of Light. Manchester City won a corner on 90+2 minutes. David Silva stepped up to take the crucial set piece and as he sent the ball into the middle, Edin Džeko headed into the net to equalise the game. Two minutes passed without any kind of important goal attempts, and right before the last extra minute of added time, Sergio Agüero attempted a one-two with Mario Balotelli. After getting the ball in his feet back again, Agüero skipped past a lunging Taye Taiwo and drove the ball into the back of the net as City triumphed in their campaign. Džeko's headed goal came at 91:15 minutes, while Agüero's came at 93:20, just 13 seconds after United's match against Sunderland had concluded.

This marked City's first English title since 1968, as well as the first time the Premier League has been won by a club whose current spell in the top division began after the League commenced play. It is also the first Premier League title to be decided on goal difference. A poll by Goal.com readers ranked this as the greatest-ever comeback, ahead of Liverpool's Champions League victory over Milan in the 2005 final, and United's turnaround against Bayern Munich in the 1999 Champions League final.

For the 2012–13 season, it seemed that City had failed to secure new players to strengthen the team, although 19-year-old Serbian international Matija Nastasić, signed from Fiorentina, would become one of the side's regular central defenders. To begin the year, rivals Manchester United established a large lead in the Premier League, City failed to win a single game in a difficult group in the Champions League, and had conceded their Champions title before the FA Cup Final against Wigan Athletic. The night before the Final, rumours were rife that manager Roberto Mancini would be sacked and replaced by Manuel Pellegrini; the team played badly and lost 1–0 to a late Wigan goal scored by Ben Watson. Mancini was sacked on the following Monday, 13 May; he took out a full page advert in the Manchester Evening News to thank the City fans for their support in his three managerial years; City fans responded by subscribing to place an advert thanking him in the Italian paper La Gazzetta dello Sport.

=== Pellegrini era (2013–2016) ===
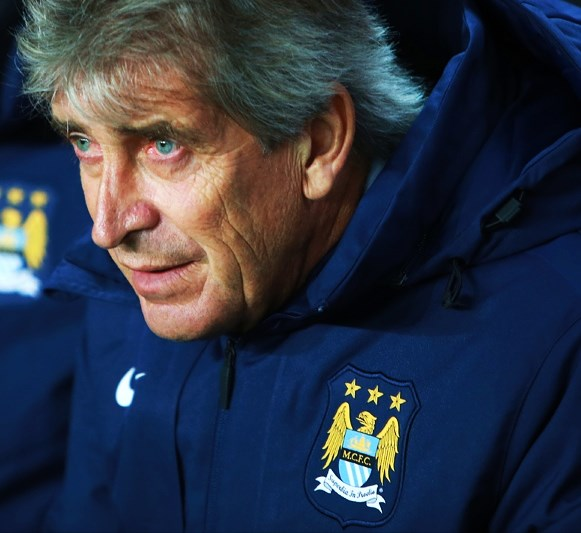
Manuel Pellegrini was Manchester City manager from 2013 to 2016, winning a Premier League title and two League Cups

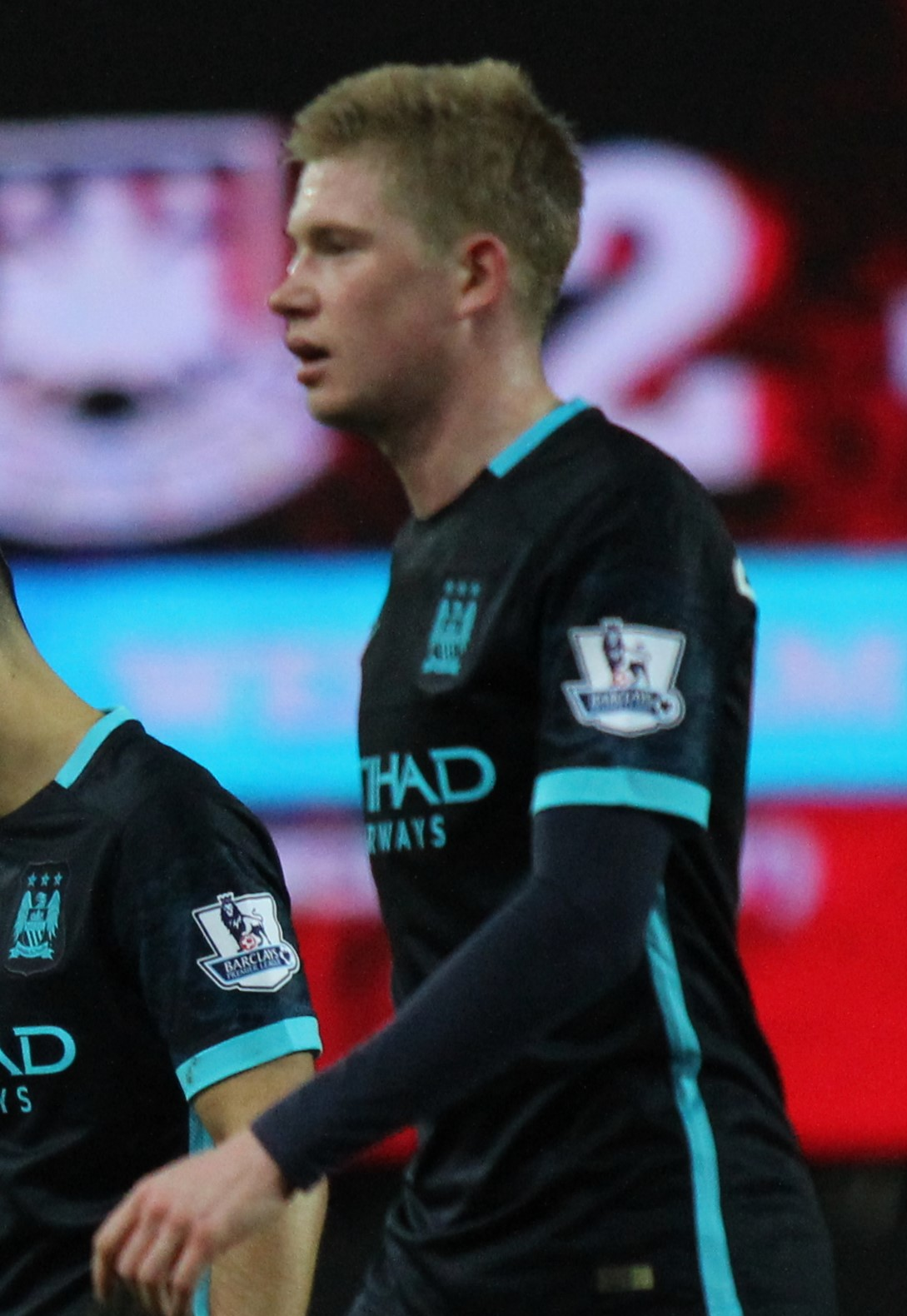
Kevin De Bruyne was signed for €55 million in 2015

One month after Mancini's departure, Chilean manager Manuel Pellegrini, formerly of Málaga and Real Madrid, was hired as his replacement. As Mancini was criticised for aggravating both his players and his boardroom-level superiors, as well as for failing to give young players a chance, Pellegrini was considered a strong candidate with a history of successful outings in the Champions League. In contrast to the late transfer dealings the previous year, CEO Ferran Soriano and Director of Football Txiki Begiristain moved quickly, securing four new signings for their new manager effectively before the team even flew out for its first pre-season match. Major acquisitions for the 2013–14 season included Álvaro Negredo and Jesús Navas for approximately £16 million and £14.9 million, respectively, from Sevilla; Fernandinho for £34 million from Shakhtar Donetsk and Stevan Jovetić for £22 million from Fiorentina; Martín Demichelis was acquired much later in the transfer window to shore up a defence ridden with injuries. Demichelis, who had transferred from Atlético Madrid despite the fact that he had only signed for them from Málaga just one month before, was almost instantly injured before playing a single game. The most significant departure from City was striker Carlos Tevez to Juventus, though Gareth Barry was also allowed to move, joining Everton on a season-long loan. This latter move was met with uncertainty from the supporters, who reckoned Barry to have a larger importance to the team than was commonly appreciated.

Pellegrini's managerial era began with mixed fortunes in pre-season, which continued into the start of the domestic season. A strong 4–0 home win over Newcastle on the opening day of the season was followed by a series of poor performances, including giving Cardiff City their first win in the top division of English football since they last were in the division, in 1961. However, an improved showing in the Champions League against Viktoria Plzeň led to a one-sided 4–1 annihilation of Manchester United, a game which was commented by the press as being even more emphatic than the 6–1 derby day win of two seasons previous. A week of vastly improved football was capped by a 5–0 demolition of Wigan Athletic, the team who had defeated City in the previous FA Cup final. In the Champions League, however, the team suffered a home defeat by reigning champions Bayern Munich, 3–1. The team would quickly recover, beating Newcastle in the League Cup and a crushing Norwich city 7–0 at home. Two six-goal home victories then followed against Spurs (6–0) on 24 November and Arsenal (6–3) on 14 December. Other successes included the home win against CSKA Moscow (5–2), then a 3–2 away victory over Bayern, marking the first time City qualified for the knockout phase of the Champions League after two prior attempts. By early January 2014, City had scored over 100 goals in all competitions, leading to talk about possibly winning four competitions.

However, elimination from the Champions League by Barcelona (4–1 on aggregate), as well as a surprise home defeat by Wigan in the FA Cup, proved the "quadruple" to be unrealistic, although City did win the League Cup, beating Sunderland 3–1 in the final. Because of postponements of Premier League games for cup matches, and for a storm that forced the late cancellation of a game, City had three league games in hand on their rivals. Nearing the end of the season, they played Liverpool away at Anfield with both teams in the position that to win every remaining game would mean winning the league. City were soon 2–0 down, but fought back to 2–2 before an error by captain Vincent Kompany led to Liverpool's winner. City won their remaining games and Liverpool lost one and drew one, leaving City two points clear at the end of the season to win their second league title in three seasons. Their tally of 102 goals was one short of Chelsea's record.

In the 2014–15 season, despite some lacklustre early season performances, City again reached the knockout stages of the Champions League and at the turn of the year had caught up with Chelsea to be joint first with identical records. Four consecutive away defeats for City, however, left Chelsea clear favourites for the title, and Barcelona again knocked City out of the Champions League. Early elimination from both the League Cup and FA Cup, as well as a drop to fourth place in the Premier League table, led to criticism of some players' commitment and Manuel Pellegrini's tactics, though City ultimately finished the season with six victories to secure second place and thus 2015–16 Champions League qualification.

City began their 2015–16 campaign with the same form they had shown at the end of the previous season. On winning their first four Premier League games, on 29 August 2015 the team set a new club record of ten consecutive league victories, beating the previous record which had stood for 103 years.

The team's form later dipped and City finished fourth, behind surprise champions Leicester City, Arsenal and Tottenham Hotspur. In the Champions League, City had an impressive run, before losing 1–0 on aggregate to eventual winners Real Madrid in the semi-finals. The teams had tied 0–0 in Manchester, before City fell 1–0 in Madrid.

On 28 February 2016, City won the League Cup after beating Liverpool on penalties at Wembley to secure their third trophy under manager Manuel Pellegrini.

Nonetheless, Pellegrini left the Cityzens when his contract expired and brought on Pep Guardiola, the decorated former Barcelona and Bayern Munich boss.

=== Guardiola era (2016–2026) ===
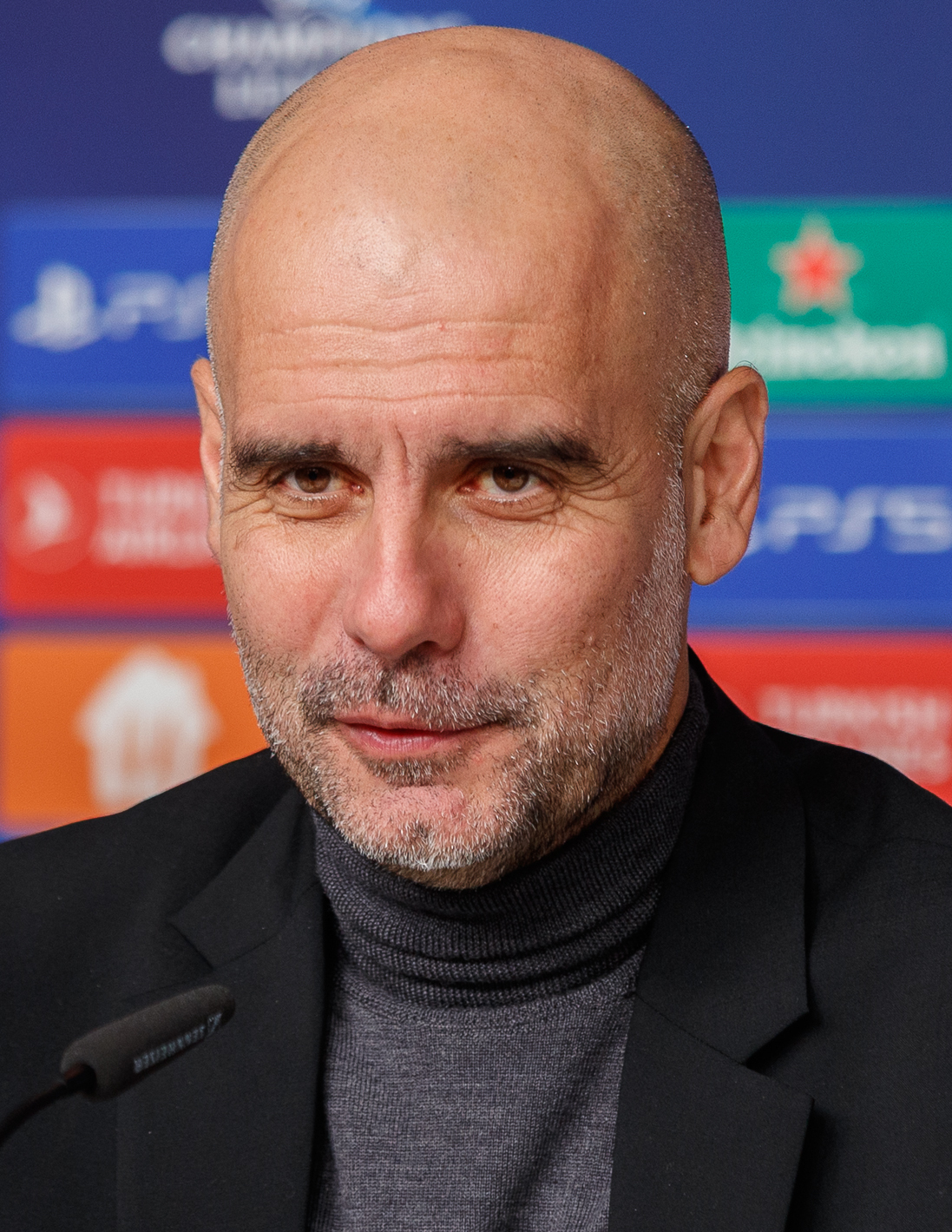
Pep Guardiola, head coach from 2016 to 2026

In spite of joining City with much hype, Pep's first season at Manchester City was underwhelming. City finished third, behind champions Chelsea and Tottenham Hotspur. The Blues were knocked out of the Champions league in the round of 16 by Monaco in a 12-goal thriller. City won 5–3 in Manchester, but lost 3–1 in Monaco, and were therefore eliminated on the away goals rule. City fell to Arsenal in the FA Cup semi-final and were also eliminated from the League Cup by local rivals Manchester United in the fourth round.

City began the 2017–18 season brightly, losing 2–0 to Manchester United, beating Real Madrid 4–1 and beating Tottenham Hotspur 3–0 in the pre-season. This form continued into their competitive Premier League campaign as City remained unbeaten through mid-December. They set a new record for the most consecutive league wins after 18 victories in a row, including a victory in Manchester Derby, which helped them widen the gap between them and second-placed Manchester United in the Premier League. City broke plenty of Premier League records this season, including, the most points (100), the most goals scored (106), the most wins (32), the most away wins (16), most away points (50), highest goal differential (+79), and highest gap between the top 2 teams (19), while equalling Manchester United 2000–01's record for games to play with title won (5). They had become a dominant force in England under Guardiola, with success only eluding them in the Champions League. City managed to retain their league title in the 2018–19 Premier League season, pipping Liverpool by a point; as well as winning an unprecedented domestic treble.

City, however, faltered behind Liverpool in the following season, being 25 points behind the runaway league leaders before the suspension of the season due to the COVID-19 pandemic. The Cityzens officially ceded the title with seven games left after a 2–1 defeat at Chelsea. Their underwhelming Premier League campaign was somewhat relieved by a third consecutive victory in the EFL Cup, beating Aston Villa 2–1 in the final on 1 March. The Blues also humiliated the newly crowned champions Liverpool at Etihad in their home league match, 5–0. City managed to score 102 goals in their campaign, the most of any team.

In the COVID-19 affected 2020–21 Premier League season, City regained their title, becoming champions for the third time in four years. After an inconsistent start which saw them in 13th place after a 2–0 defeat away to Tottenham with nine games played, City achieved a remarkable winning streak, which ran 82 days from December 2020 to March 2021. During this run, City broke the records for most consecutive wins by a top flight English team in all competitions (21), the most consecutive league wins by a top flight team from the start of a calendar year (13), and equalled their club record for 28 games unbeaten in all competitions. They ended the season twelve points ahead of second-placed Manchester United, winning the title with three games to spare. They also won the EFL Cup for a record-equalling fourth consecutive season and eighth time in total, beating Tottenham 1–0 in the final. Their league victory was the tenth league and cup title of Guardiola's five year tenure, making him the most successful manager in the club's history. He had extended his contract to at least 2023 at the start of the season. The major breakthrough occurred in the Champions League, where City went on an incredible run on the way to their first-ever European Cup final. However, the all-English affair against Chelsea was lost 0–1, denying the Blues their first European trophy since 1970.

Before the start of the 2021–22 season, City broke the British transfer record for the fourth time in their history, and the first time since their transfer of Robinho in 2008, when they signed Jack Grealish from Aston Villa for a reported fee of £100 million. Somewhat controversially they had not been able to sign a replacement striker for Sergio Agüero, City's all time record goalscorer, who had left at the end of his contract after 10 years to join Barcelona at the end of the previous season. City's early form in the season was good, despite two consecutive 1–0 defeats in the Community Shield against Leicester and away in their opening league fixture to Tottenham, ending a ten-year opening league fixture winning streak. On 25 September they recorded a notable 1–0 away victory against early league leaders and European champions Chelsea. This was Guardiola's 221st win as City's manager and was a new club record. City ended the year on another impressive 10 game winning streak, taking them to the top of the table with an 8 point lead over 2nd placed Chelsea. Their lack of an out and out striker seeming no hindrance in notching 7–0, 4–0 and 6–3 victories over Leeds, Newcastle and Leicester respectively during December with extensive use of the False Nine position. Guardiola had achieved more than 10 consecutive league wins on four different occasions as City's manager. No other Premier manager had done this more than twice. City also had set new Premier League records for most league wins, away wins and goals scored in a calendar year. At one point in January 2022, City were 14 points ahead of Liverpool (who had two games in hand), but this lead diminished to only a point as Liverpool went on a 12-game winning run. City eventually retained their league title by a point from Liverpool; making it four titles in five seasons. In another case of "typical City", needing four points from their last two fixtures, City had fallen behind by two goals in both games, only to recover to a 2–2 draw against West Ham away, and to a 3–2 win at home to Aston Villa in the season finale. These last three goals were all scored in a five minute blitz between the 76th and 81st minute, with İlkay Gündoğan scoring a brace, at a euphoric sell out Etihad Stadium in moments that would be remembered alongside those famous victories in the 1999 play-off final against Gillingham and the 2011–12 Premier League finale against QPR.

Despite sustained domestic success, Manchester City’s inability to win the UEFA Champions League led some commentators and supporters to question whether the team would be regarded among the greatest sides in football history. The 2022–23 season saw the club win a third consecutive Premier League title, the FA Cup against Manchester United, and the UEFA Champions League, completing a continental treble as defined in association football.

==== In Europe under Guardiola: first European Cup final and continental treble ====
In the first season under the reign Pep Guardiola, hopes were high for Manchester City as they progressed to the knockout phase after finishing second in the group that featured Guardiola's former team, Barcelona. City lost their away match to Barça 0–4, but then rebounded to win 3–1 at home. In the Round of 16 City were drawn against Monaco. The Blues were trailing 1–2 and 2–3 in their home match before scoring three unanswered goals and winning 5–3. In the away game, the Cityzens were down 0–2 when Leroy Sané scored to put City in front of the tie again, but Tiémoué Bakayoko's late goal meant that Monaco progressed further and City were eliminated.

The 2017–18 season was an undoubted success for the Blues domestically, but their European campaign was quite underwhelming. The team confidently won five games in the group stage and qualified for the knockout stage, where they defeated Basel 5–2 on aggregate. The Cityzens were drawn with fellow Premier League side Liverpool in the quarter-finals. The outcome of those games was an utter devastation as Manchester City were thrashed 5–1 on aggregate and eliminated amid the controversy with refereeing mistakes favourable to Liverpool. The Premier League title where City achieved 100 points was somewhat a consolation for this anticlimactic European campaign.

Manchester City were one of the favourites prior to their 2018–19 Champions league campaign. The team again won their group with 13 points, then defeated Schalke 04 in the Round of 16, winning their home game with a record 7–0 scoreline. Similarly to the previous season, Manchester City were drawn against an English club in the quarter-finals, this time Tottenham Hotspur. The Blues lost the away game 0–1, with Agüero missing a penalty. In the home leg, Sterling scored early for the hosts, but then City quickly conceded two goals and now needed to score three. They did exactly that, leading 4–2 twenty minutes before the end of the game, but Fernando Llorente's wrongly awarded handball meant that City were again required to score. In stoppage time, Sterling converted a pass from Agüero to seemingly send City through. However, the goal was disallowed after a VAR review, and the Blues were eliminated in a heartbreaking fashion. Manchester City swept all their domestic tournaments that season, but were still unable to add European success.

Acknowledging that City would be judged by their Champions League performance after all, Pep Guardiola stated that the new season's main objective would be to win the European title. The Cityzens progressed to the knockout phase and faced old foes Real Madrid there. City won the away game 2–1, becoming only the third British team to beat Madrid at the Santiago Bernabéu, but the remainder of the tournament was indefinitely postponed due to the COVID-19 pandemic. Finally, UEFA announced that the tournament would be resumed in August 2020. The home match against Madrid was scheduled for 7 August. Thanks to goals from Raheem Sterling and Gabriel Jesus, the Citizens once again defeated Madrid 2–1, achieving a 4–2 victory on aggregate and advancing to the quarter-finals. Man City faced Lyon on 15 August, losing 3–1 and exiting the Champions league at the quarter-final stage for the third year in a row.

The 2020–21 campaign saw City top its group with a club record of 16 points, twice defeating Marseille and Olympiacos, and collecting four points against Porto. In the round of 16, the Blues were paired with Borussia Mönchengladbach and progressed to the quarter-finals for the fourth consecutive year after winning both legs 2–0. In the quarter-finals, City were paired against another German outfit, this time Borussia Dortmund. The Blues managed to neutralize Dortmund's inform striker Erling Haaland to win the double-legged tie 4–2 on aggregate after two identical 2–1 wins home and away. In the semi-finals, Manchester City were drawn against reigning finalists Paris Saint-Germain who had avenged their loss to Bayern Munich in the 2020 final by knocking out the German club in their quarter-final tie on away goals. City rallied from behind to win 2–1 at the Parc des Princes thanks to goals by Kevin De Bruyne and Riyad Mahrez. The Blues then secured their first ever European Cup final by defeating the Parisian outfit 2–0 (4–1 on aggregate) at the Etihad, with Mahrez scoring a brace. City met Chelsea in the final, making it the third all-English final in the competition's history. However, the Citizens were defeated 1–0 at the Estádio do Dragão in Porto, courtesy of a lone Kai Havertz goal. Still, City's breakthrough marked its most successful European campaign to date.

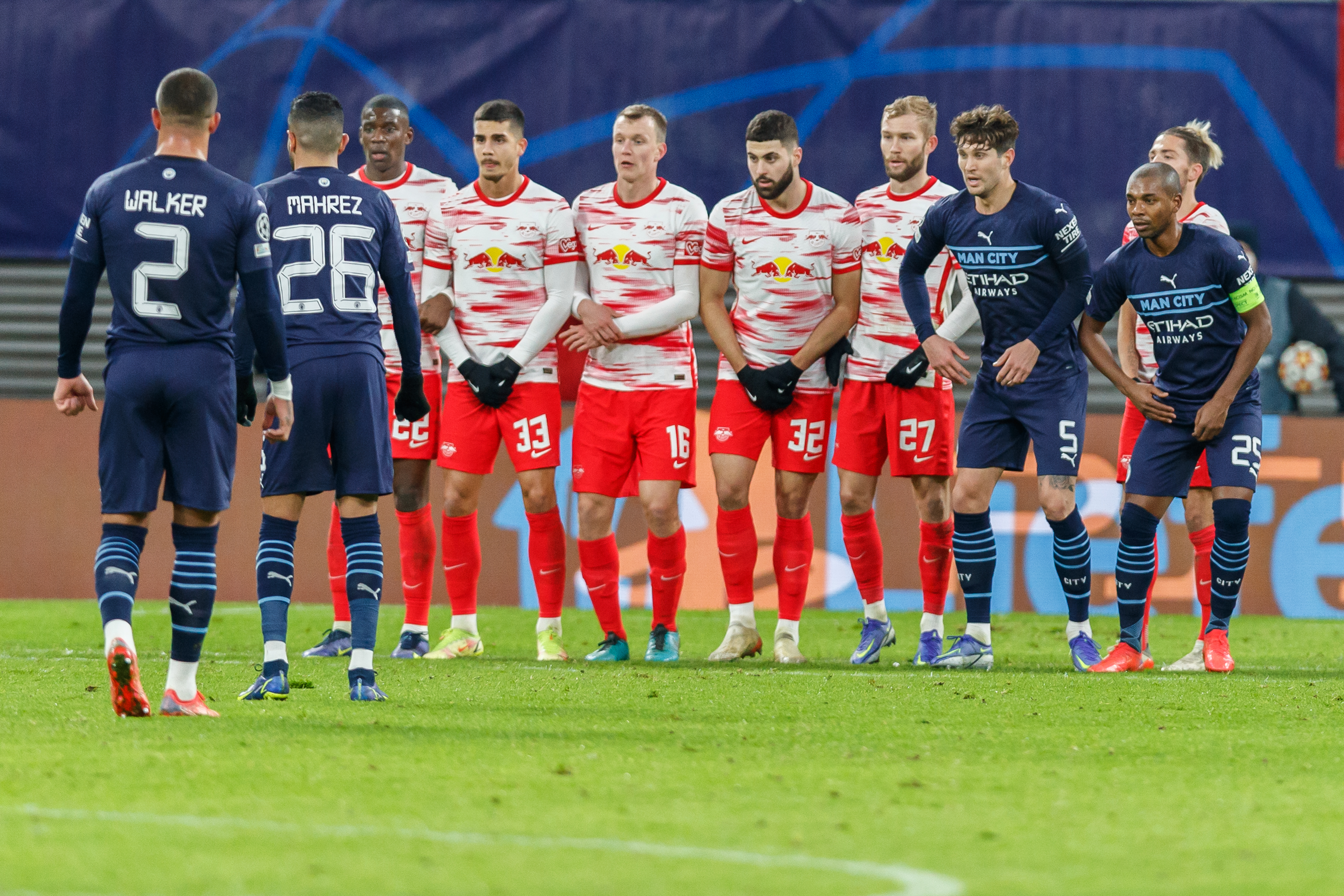
Manchester City playingagainst RB Leipzig in the UEFA Champions League, on 7 December 2021.

City once more reached the Champions League semi-finals in the 2021–22 competition. They won a group including Paris Sant Germain, RB Leipzig and Club Brugges with four victories and two defeats. In the round of 16 they earnt a commanding first leg lead in their tie against Sporting Lisbon, beating the Portuguese champions 5–0 away including a brace from Bernardo Silva. before wrapping up the victory with a 0–0 draw at home. In the quarter-final a 1–0 victory in the first leg at home gave City a slight advantage against Atlético as they headed to Madrid. An intense and maturely hard fought 0–0 draw then ensured City progressed to the semi-finals. There, City beat Real Madrid 4–3 in an outstanding game at a full and noisy Etihad Stadium to take a slender advantage to the Bernabéu. City scored in under 2 minutes as Kevin De Bruyne finished the fastest goal in European Cup semi-final history and had held a two goal advantage on three occasions during the tie, with several other good opportunities to increase their lead, only to see a resilient Madrid reduce their deficit to a single goal, including a brace and Panenka penalty from their top scorer, captain and talisman Karim Benzema. City would go onto regret these missed opportunities as they failed to reach the Champions League final in dramatic and heart-breaking circumstances. Leading the second leg 1–0 (5–3 on aggregate), from a 75th minute goal from Riyad Mahrez, and approaching the last minute of normal time, it appeared City were heading comfortably to the final, where they would have met Liverpool. However two goals in a minute from Madrid's substitute striker Rodrygo sent the game into extra time; and another penalty from Benzema five minutes later proved to be the winner as City were defeated 1–3 (5–6 on aggregate).

For the third consecutive season, and for the fourth time in the club's history, City reached the Champions League semi-finals in 2022–23. After topping their group of Borussia Dortmund of the Bundesliga, Sevilla of La Liga and F.C. Copenhagen of the Danish Superliga undefeated, with four wins and two draws, the Blues were drawn up against RB Leipzig in the round of 16 for the third and fourth fixtures between the sides in their histories. At the Red Bull Arena, Riyad Mahrez's first half opener was cancelled out by Joško Gvardiol in the second half, and City drew 1–1 after being denied a penalty in the final seconds. The draw would not matter as City eviscerated the German side 7–0 in the second leg, with a record-equalling five goals from Erling Haaland, and one each from new captain İlkay Gündoğan and from Kevin De Bruyne. The Blues would then be drawn up against another Bundesliga side, this time Bayern Munich, 2019–20 Champions League winners and reigning German champions. In the first leg at the Etihad Stadium, City comfortably outplayed Bayern and defeated them 3–0, with a first Champions League goal for Rodri and one each from Bernardo Silva and Erling Haaland, effectively sending City through after one leg. The following week, they drew 1–1 at the Allianz Arena, with another goal from Haaland confirming City's semi-finals spot 4–1 on aggregate to face Real Madrid there for the second consecutive season. The first leg was played at the Santiago Bernabéu Stadium, and Vinícius Júnior gave Madrid a 1–0 lead at half time with a stunning goal. However, City's reliable talisman Kevin De Bruyne salvaged the Blues a 1–1 draw at a stadium that saw their Champions League campaign collapse a year ago. Then, in one of their best performances in the Pep Guardiola era, Manchester City sealed their spot in the final thanks to an incredible 4–0 win in the second leg at the Etihad Stadium, with a first half brace from Bernardo Silva, and second half goals from Manuel Akanji and Julián Álvarez.

On 10 June 2023, at the Atatürk Olympic Stadium in front of 71,412 supporters, a second half goal from Rodri saw Manchester City win the Champions League final against Inter Milan, completing a historic continental treble, only the second in English men's football history. In doing so, City completed a task set out 15 years ago in 2008 when the club was purchased by the Abu Dhabi United Group in winning the UEFA Champions League. The game itself was a nervy one for the Blues; in the fifth minute, Bernardo Silva curled an effort just wide. Erling Haaland and Kevin De Bruyne both had efforts, but they were saved by Inter goalkeeper André Onana. In the 36th minute, De Bruyne was substituted due to injury for the second time in a Champions League final, after going off in City's 2021 defeat to Chelsea. In the 59th minute, City's keeper Ederson failed to collect a weird backpass from Manuel Akanji which was found by Inter's Lautaro Martínez; his shot from near the touchline was blocked by Ederson. Rodri scored the opening goal for City in the 68th minute by finishing a pulled-back pass that Bernardo Silva sent from near the goal to the top of the penalty area. Inter had a chance to equalise three minutes later through a header by defender Federico Dimarco that hit the crossbar. Dimarco tried to capitalise on the rebound as well, but his shot was blocked by on-loan Chelsea striker Romelu Lukaku. The Belgian striker had his own chance to score from a close-range header in the 89th minute, which Ederson blocked with his legs. The Brazilian made an additional save in stoppage time off Robin Gosens' header to preserve a 1–0 victory for City. With this being the club's first European Cup title (making them the first new winners of the competition since fellow English club Chelsea in 2012), City became the sixth English club, and 23rd overall, to win the European Cup, which marked the 15th time an English club were European champions.

=== Sexual abuse scandal ===
In late 2016, allegations of sexual abuse of young players at Manchester City were made due to the club's association with Barry Bennell (also at Crewe Alexandra and previously convicted of sexual abuse offences in the UK and US). On 23 November, former Manchester City players David White and Paul Stewart made allegations about Bennell, and about another coach (later named as Frank Roper) at the Nova feeder club. On 25 November, two further youth players, Jason Dunford and Chris Unsworth, also alleged sexual abuse by Bennell, initially at a Manchester City nursery team; Dunford also later spoke of abuse by Frank Roper. (In February 2018, it was revealed that three former Manchester City players had lodged civil cases against the club in March 2016 after allegedly becoming victims of Bennell.)

In February 2018, Bennell was sentenced for a total of 50 offences against 12 boys, and jailed for 31 years. After the guilty verdicts, Unsworth read a statement outside Liverpool Crown Court; another victim, Gary Cliffe, waived his anonymity to speak about the abuse he had experienced, aged 11 to 15, from Bennell while at Manchester City. The club offered its "heartfelt sympathy to all victims for the unimaginably traumatic experiences they have endured", and said an internal review had identified serious allegations of child sex abuse in respect of a second man, John Broome (now dead), with "potential historic connections to the club".

Manchester City said it had opened an investigation regarding Bennell's association with the club in the 1980s; in May 2017, it was reported this was being led by Jane Mulcahy QC. In March 2019, a year after Bennell was convicted and jailed, and with the Mulcahy review still ongoing, Manchester City announced it had created a compensation fund for victims of historical child sexual abuse at the club. It was aware of 40 potential claimants (with more expected to come forward), and regarded the civil redress scheme as a preferable alternative to victims pursuing civil claims through the courts. In May 2020, it was reported that eight men sexually abused by Barry Bennell were pursuing damages claims against Manchester City (two were also bringing claims against Crewe Alexandra), and all eight claims were heard together at an eight-week trial that started in October 2021. On 10 January 2022, the High Court ruled that City could not be held legally responsible for Bennell's acts of abuse.

=== Financial Fair Play investigations ===
In November 2018, internal club emails published in Der Spiegel led to allegations that Manchester City had breached UEFA's Financial Fair Play rules.

In March 2019, UEFA began investigating the club on this matter. In February 2020, the Adjudicatory Chamber of UEFA's Club Financial Control Body (CFCB) decided that the club had indeed broken Financial Fair Play rules by "overstating its sponsorship revenue in its accounts and in the break-even information submitted to UEFA between 2012 and 2016". A second finding was that Manchester City had not cooperated with the investigation. As such, a two-season ban from European football was implemented, as well as a 30 million euro fine.

Manchester City appealed to the Court of Arbitration for Sport (CAS), and the case was decided in July 2020. CAS found that some allegations were "time-barred" from being investigated, as they were above the five-years-old limit for such UEFA investigations, while other allegations were unproven. As such, CAS overturned the European ban of the club. However, "there was a legitimate basis to prosecute" Manchester City, and UEFA had given Manchester City "due process"; despite the club's claim that UEFA was biased against them.

Additionally, CAS found that Manchester City "obstructed the investigations of the CFCB" by failing to produce significant amounts of evidence to CFCB. CAS opined that this "severe breach" should be "seriously reproached". Given the overall findings of CAS, the punishment for the club over this incident was set at 10 million euros.

A further report from Der Spiegel in April 2022 claimed, based on leaked internal documents, that the Abu Dhabi owners had previously made payments into the club disguised as sponsorship payments by Emirati companies like Etihad and Etisalat (the same claim that the club had successfully defended at CAS in 2020); Sheikh Mansour‘s Abu Dhabi United Group (ADUG) had allegedly indirectly paid for underage players to sign with the club; and that the club had allegedly used a fictitious contract between Roberto Mancini and Mansour‘s Al Jazira Club to pay large compensation fees to the former manager in addition to his salary. It also claimed that these three cases were under investigation by the Premier League for the last three years. In response, Manchester City dismissed these claims as untrue and classified them as another systematic attempt to undermine the reputation and integrity of the club.

== See also ==
- List of Manchester City F.C. seasons
- Manchester City F.C. in Europe
- History of Manchester City F.C.
- History of Manchester City F.C. (1880–1928)
- History of Manchester City F.C. (1928–1965)
- History of Manchester City F.C. (1965–2001)
- Rui Pinto
