= Football Leaks =

Former football leaks website

- Creator: Rui Pinto
- Website: footballleaks2015.wordpress.com
- Commercial: No
- Launched: September 2015
- Current status: Online, but inactive

Football Leaks was a leak in association football revealing "murky" financial transactions in the world of European professional football and exposes the tax tricks employed by some of the continent's biggest stars. It began with a series of investigations published in December 2016 and November 2018 by media partners of the European Investigative Collaborations (EIC), such as Der Spiegel, Mediapart, El Mundo, Expresso, Falter, L'espresso, and Le Soir.

Initially, Football Leaks was a website containing confidential information about notable footballers and clubs.

Rui Pinto, the author of Football Leaks, was arrested in Budapest, Hungary, on 16 January 2019 at the request of the Portuguese authorities for suspicion of attempted qualified extortion, violation of secrecy and illegally accessing information. He was extradited to Portugal and has been charged with 147 crimes by the Public Ministry.

Rui Pinto was found guilty of three counts of intercepting correspondence and accessing private emails, one count of attempted extortion and five counts of unauthorized entry and hacking into computers belonging to the Doyen Sports Investment Fund, the Portuguese attorney general’s office, and a Lisbon law firm. As a result, he was sentenced to a suspended sentence of four years.

== Leaks ==
The website was set up in September 2015 and reveals transfer fee, wage and contract information about famous footballers. Its first leak was about third-party agreements between FC Twente and Doyen Sports, which led to the Royal Dutch Football Association banning Twente from European football for three years. Football Leaks also revealed that AS Monaco paid €43 million for Radamel Falcao, rather than around €60 million as had been estimated. In addition, the website revealed that, when Neymar signed for FC Barcelona, he received an €8.5 million signing fee, with a buyout clause of €190 million (£152 million), and that he earns €77,000 a week. A leak revealed that Gareth Bale's transfer from Tottenham Hotspur to Real Madrid was over €100 million, more than the €96 million the club paid for Cristiano Ronaldo. The website also revealed that Ronaldo earned €1.1 million for doing a photoshoot with Mobily. Another leak related to James Rodríguez's transfer from Monaco to Real Madrid for €75 million plus €15 million in additional clauses.

In 2016, Football Leaks documents were used by the BBC and other media organisations to report allegations that Cristiano Ronaldo had concealed income from the Spanish tax authorities through offshore structures. In January 2019, Ronaldo was found guilty of tax fraud in Spain and agreed to pay a fine and serve a suspended prison sentence.

Der Spiegel used documents provided by Football Leaks concerning an allegation of rape against Cristiano Ronaldo as the basis for a story published in April 2017.

In January 2016, it was claimed that Football Leaks was being investigated by the Portuguese authorities over claims of blackmail and extortion. Later in February, Liga Nacional de Fútbol Profesional president Javier Tebas blamed FIFA for the leaks of contract details of three La Liga players. In April that year, the website announced that it was temporarily ceasing its leaks.

In November 2018, Football Leaks said that there had been undercover talks about the creation of a new continental club competition, the European Super League, which would begin play in 2021 which ultimately would not happen, though the Super League was announced in 2021. In the same month, the website claimed that both Manchester City and Paris Saint-Germain were violating UEFA Financial Fair Play Regulations. More than one year before, Manchester City faced punishment from UEFA for the exact issue, and one month after, UEFA cleared Paris Saint-Germain of breaching FFP rules, a decision that was later upheld by the Court of Arbitration for Sport in March 2019. The disclosures prompted investigations by UEFA and subsequently the Premier League, whose investigation resulted in Manchester City being charged in February 2023 with 115 alleged breaches of its financial regulations. In September 2026, they were found guilty of 114 of 115 charges, with punishment still pending.

== European Investigative Collaborators (EIC) ==
In December 2016, Der Spiegel and other partners at the European Investigative Collaborations (EIC) network (including L'Espresso, Le Soir, NRC Handelsblad, The Romanian Centre for Investigative Journalism / The Black Sea, Mediapart, Politiken, Falter, NewsWeek, El Mundo, The Sunday Times, and Expresso) began publishing information about tax avoidance by several football stars. Some of the information was collected by Football Leaks. The leaks include "about 18.6 million documents, including contracts, e-mails and spreadsheets, which served as material for investigative journalism work by 60 journalists from 12 European media." On 5 December, El Mundo revealed a judicial decree from Spanish judge Arturo Zamarriego that prohibits EIC from publishing information until "the legal investigation of its obtaining". Reporters Without Borders described the decision as "an attempt to censor on a continental scale".

== Third-party ownership in association football ==
The leaks revealed Third-Party Ownership (TPO) of footballers, "whereby a player's economic rights are owned in stakes by investors". According to the Football Leaks documents obtained by Der Spiegel and shared with the EIC, certain individuals, international corporations and even large banks were implicated. One of the creators of Football Leaks conducted an interview with Der Spiegel in February 2016 using the pseudonym John.

== In popular culture ==
- A Game of Secrets (2022), documentary by Niels Borchert Holm about the Football Leaks.

== See also ==
- Offshore Leaks
- Panama Papers
- Tax haven
