= Indigo Publications =

French publication company

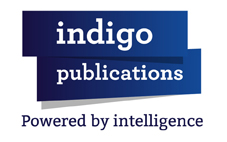
- Industry: Subscription news websites
- Founded: 1981
- Founder: Maurice Botbol
- Headquarters: Paris
- Products: Africa Intelligence, Intelligence Online, Glitz.paris, La Lettre A
- Revenue: €6.7 million (2021)
- Net income: 50,000 euro (2025)
- Owner: Quentin Botbol
- Number of employees: 60 (2021)
- Website: indigo.fr/en

Indigo Publications is a French company founded in 1981 that publishes four news websites dedicated to specialized business sectors: Intelligence Online, Africa Intelligence, La Lettre, and Glitz.

== History ==
Indigo Publications was established in Paris in 1981. Founder Maurice Botbol assembled a small team of investigative journalists dedicated to economic news. Botbol serves as director of Indigo Publications and was President of the Syndicat presse indépendante d' information en ligne (Union of the Independent Press Information Online). Indigo is a French media group serving a global audience, but hangs its credibility on remaining editorially independent: as Botbol explains, "We are not culturally partisan, either toward France's interests nor those of the third world.... We are very careful not to have any 'national' positioning."

The Indian Ocean Newsletter was the first Indigo publication, focused on the business interests of East and southern Africa and the Indian Ocean states. Over the years, the company launched other regional titles including the economic newsletter for Francophone Africa, La Lettre du Continent (and its English equivalent, West Africa Newsletter); the North African newspaper Maghreb Confidential; and more specialized business publications like Africa Mining Intelligence and Intelligence Online. In 2007, Indigo acquired La Lettre A, a newsletter established in 1978 that specializes in news and analysis of politics and business in France. In April 2011, Indigo launched an online spinoff of La Lettre A called Entourages.

The company functions as a SAS (sociétés par actions simplifiées), with headquarters in Paris previously in the rue Montmartre. Indigo Publications' new offices are located in Paris's Republique neighborhood.

=== Value-added tax audit controversy ===
On December 16, 2013, Indigo Publications and another French digital publisher, Mediapart, were audited by the French Inland Revenue Service over Value-added tax (VAT). The VAT rate for online news was 19.6% (20% starting in 2014), while that of traditional media was 2.1%, a disparity that had been in place since 2009. The companies contested the higher rate, and on January 31, 2015, in a ruling opposed by the European Commission, but consistent with the jurisprudence of the Court of Justice of the European Union, the French Budget Ministry issued taxing instructions, and a law was unanimously adopted by the National Assembly on February 4, and by the Senate on February 17, 2014, granting equality of tax treatment between traditional print and digital press.

== Publications ==
Indigo publishes four different publications in both French and English. Since 1995, Indigo Publications has implemented a digital development strategy, and went with all digital publication of Intelligence Online and all the company's Africa publications, on the Africa Intelligence website in April 2013. As of January 2016, all publications are now 100% digital.

=== Intelligence Online ===
Intelligence Online, formerly Intelligence Newsletter, reports on and analyses secret diplomacy, parallel operations and conflicts around the world, focusing on the role of government intelligence agencies, corporate intelligence firms and lobby groups. It also investigates money-laundering, political instability, terrorism, espionage and organized crime in North America, Europe, the Middle East and Asia. Pierre Gastineau is the Editor-in-Chief.

=== Africa Intelligence ===
In 2020, "The Indian Ocean Newsletter", "Africa Mining Intelligence", "West Africa Newsletter", and "Maghreb Confidential" were regrouped into the publication Africa Intelligence. The publication's editor-in-chief is Paul Deutschmann.

=== La Lettre ===
La Lettre is dedicated to the political, economic and media news in France. Octave Bonnaud is the Editor-in-Chief of La Lettre.

=== Glitz ===
In September 2022, Indigo Publications launched Glitz, a publication dedicated to the international luxury sector. Glitz's editor-in-chief is Phillippe Vasset.
