= Intelligence Online =

Online newspaper about intelligence services

- Screenshot
- Former name: Le Monde du Renseignement/Intelligence Newsletter
- Website type: News outlet
- Available in: 2 languages
- List of languages French, English
- Founded: 1980
- Headquarters: 10 Fontaine au Roi Street, Paris, {{{location_country}}}
- Owner: Indigo Publications
- Editor: Pierre Gastineau
- CEO: Quentin Botbol
- Website: https://www.intelligenceonline.com/
- Commercial: yes
- ISSN: 1630-6589

Intelligence Online (abbreviated as IO) is an independent French investigative journalism website reporting on the activity of intelligence services (DGSE, US Intelligence Community, MI6, BND, Russian services...), competitive intelligence, foreign relations and diplomacy.

Founded in 1980, it is headquartered in Paris and published in two languages (French and English) by the independent press company Indigo Publications. Its editor-in-chief is Antoine Izambard. The website runs on a subscription-based model.

== History ==
Intelligence Online was founded in 1980, under the name of Le Monde du Renseignement in French and Intelligence Newsletter in English by the Association for the Right to Information (in French: Association pour le Droit à l'Information).

In 1989, the independent press company Indigo Publications took over Le Monde du Renseignement. In 1995, articles began to be published on the subscription-based website Intelligence Online. Six years later, in September 2001, the two print magazines, Le Monde du renseignement and Intelligence Newsletter, were renamed Intelligence Online as well.

The last print copy of Intelligence Online was released in 2013, turning the media outlet into a digital pure player. A PDF newsletter kept being published every two weeks. In 2021, the media evolved into a daily news publication focused on intelligence and international strategic affairs.

== See also ==
- Investigative journalism
- Human intelligence (HUMINT)
- Indigo Publications
