= La Lettre (website) =

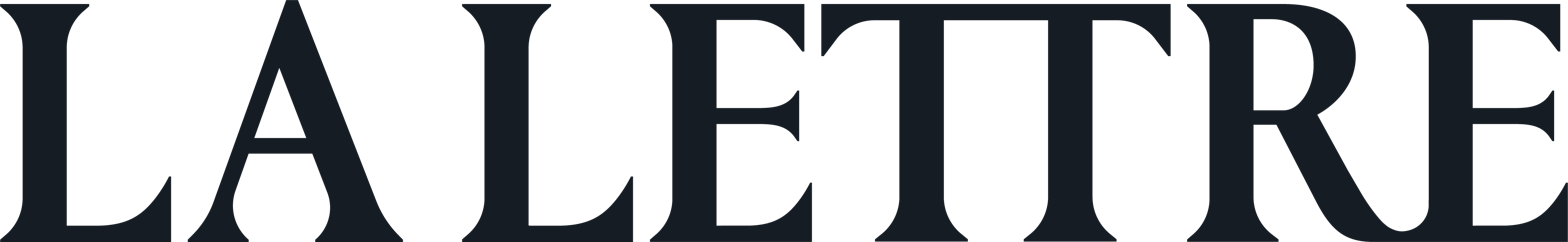
- Former name: La Lettre A
- Website type: News outlet
- Available in: French, English
- Founded: 1978
- Headquarters: 10 Fontaine au Roi Street, Paris, {{{location_country}}}
- Owner: Indigo Publications
- Editor: Octave Bonnaud
- CEO: Quentin Botbol
- Website: https://www.lalettre.fr
- Commercial: yes
- ISSN: 1151-1540

La Lettre (formerly La Lettre A) is a digital investigative publication covering politics, business, and media in France, published by Indigo Publications.

== History ==
Initially published weekly in print format, La Lettre was created in 1978 by Alain Dumait, who was a journalist working for L'Express. In 1993, the publication was bought by the company Immopresse run by Jean-Michel Quatrepoint, former journalist at Le Monde, who also led the editorial teams of Agefi, La Tribune and Nouvel Économiste.

In 2007, Indigo Publications, run by journalist Maurice Botbol, acquired La Lettre A and simultaneously launched the website LaLettreA.fr.

In May 2016, La Lettre A published its last print edition while maintaining the weekly rhythm on its website, and a PDF edition.

In March 2018, La Lettre A became a daily publication published online from Monday to Friday. At the same time, the publication PresseNews, acquired by Indigo Publications in 2011, joined its editorial team.

Konbini was convicted in 2022 of abusive litigation after having sued La Lettre A for defamation, which Libération described as a intimidation lawsuit.

Deficit-making at the time of its takeover by Indigo Publications in 2007, La Lettre increased its revenue by 22% in 2021 and 2022 and its situation improve.

On October 2023, the title was simplified from La Lettre A to La Lettre. Publisher also announced plans to translate some of its articles into English starting from June 2024. The same year, an office was opened in Brussels and the editorial team includes 14 journalists. Some staff must move in December to new premises in the 11th arrondissement of Paris.

== Editorial line ==
La Lettre does not publish advertising, and does not engage in activities outside of press. Its revenue comes from reader subscriptions (subscriptions, single sales).

The publishing company, Indigo Publications, was created by journalists in 1981 and whose capital is held only by individuals. The goal is to preserve its editorial independence.

== Investigations ==
La Lettre claims to publish mainly exclusive information on political, economic, and media power in France.

La Lettre A notably revealed that the team supporting Les Républicains candidate in the 2017 presidential election, François Fillon, had sent highly targeted emails to readers of certain media outlets, based on their presumed areas of interest. The publication pointed out that 2.54 million people had received emails from the political party during the month of April 2017. These press organs reacted via a statement aimed at denying these claims as "serious and defamatory". They did not know that emails collected via their website would be rented to a political team. La Lettre A also revealed in October 2017 that François Fillon's consulting company, 2F Conseil, had paid him €144,000 of its 2016 revenue of €312,732, i.e. €16,000 per month in remuneration between 2013 and 2016.

In September 2017, La Lettre A revealed that the Socialist Party had mortgaged its headquarters on rue de Solférino to secure a loan to fund Benoît Hamon's campaign.

La Lettre A revealed in September 2017 that the Île-de-France region had rented a mansion to Albert Dupontel's production company for 300 euros per week between 2012 and 2017, while this classified historic monument building was valued at more than 9 million euros.

These revelations have sometimes led to legal proceedings. Notably, the complaint filed by the En Marche! team following the publication by La Lettre A of the article "Who were En Marche's first (major) donors?" published on 11 May 2017, a few days after the second round of the French presidential election. This complaint for "handling of data system breach" following this article based on elements from the MacronLeaks was widely discussed. The prosecutor in charge of the case decided not to prosecute the publishing director.

La Lettre A also shed light in April 2018 on a major military failure by revealing that the naval cruise missile (MdCN) from MBDA, used for the first time in combat on 14 April 2018 as part of the French armed forces' intervention against the Syrian regime, had experienced malfunctions.
