= Glitz (website) =

French investigative news outlet

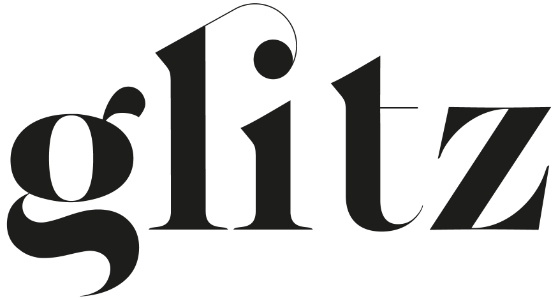
- Website type: News outlet
- Available in: French, English
- Founded: 2022
- Headquarters: Paris, France
- Editor: Philippe Vasset
- Parent: Indigo Publications
- Website: https://www.glitz.paris
- Commercial: yes

Glitz is a French digital newsletter outlet specialized in the luxury business sector. It was created in 2022 by Indigo Publications and is published in English and French languages.

== History ==
The investigative publication was created in late September 2022 by Indigo Publications as a digital newsletter. The editorial team is led by Philippe Vasset, an investigative novelist and journalist, and former editor-in-chief at Indigo Publications. It is a weekly subscription publication, which hoped to reach a daily publication output.

In 2025, the media outlet took legal action after being targeted by several denial-of-service cyberattacks.

== Reception ==
The New York Times thought it may sound more like a "gossip rag" but commended its initial "teaser stories" in 2022. The Institut national de l'audiovisuel (ina) noted Glitz as the first luxury sector investigative outlet in France and described its source protection policy in 2023. In September 2024, Bernard Arnault, CEO of LVMH, added the title to a list of seven media outlets whose staff LVMH executives are absolutely forbidden from speaking to, under penalty of dismissal.
