= Philippe Vasset =

French novelist and journalist

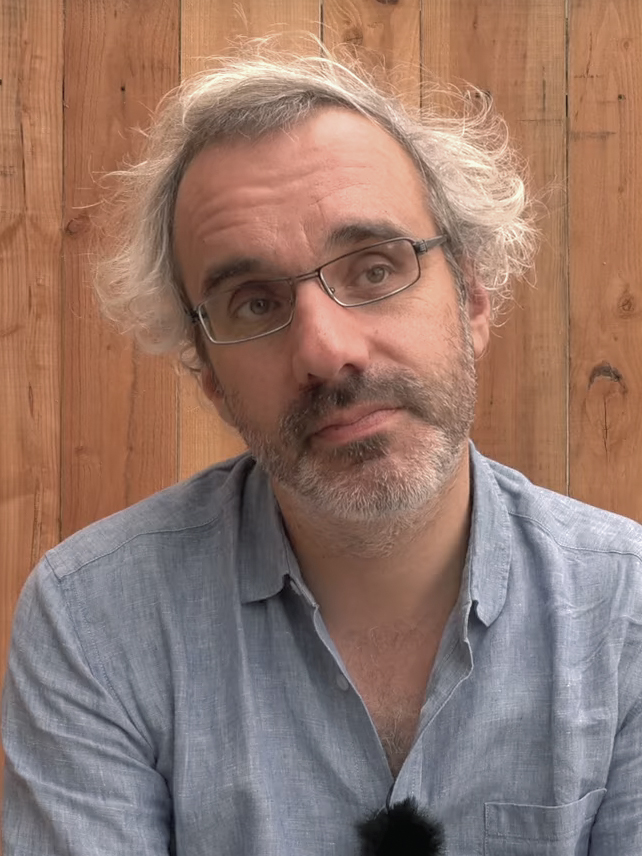
Philippe Vasset (2018)

Philippe Vasset (born 1972) is a French novelist and journalist. He is the editor in chief of the investigative newsletter Glitz, published by Indigo Publications press group. Before his career in journalism, he worked as a corporate detective in the United States. In 1993, he was awarded the Best Young Writer prize by the French daily Le Monde. Following his debut ScriptGenerator®™ (2004), he has already written a second novel.

In 2023, Abu Dhabi Secrets revealed that Vasset, while serving as editor of Africa Intelligence, had "regularly used information" from Alp Services, a Swiss private investigation firm operated by Mario Brero, which engaged in offensive viral communication campaigns.
