= Newsweek Serbia =

- Editor-in-chief: Milorad Ivanović
- Categories: News magazine and web portal
- Frequency: Weekly and daily
- Publisher: Adria Media Group
- Founded: February, 2015
- Country: Serbia
- Based in: Belgrade
- Language: Serbian
- Website: newsweek.rs

Newsweek Serbia is a weekly Serbian language news magazine and web portal published in Serbia as the Serbian edition of Newsweek.

Newsweek Serbia was established in 2015. The magazine and portal is owned by Adria Media Group. It has a neutral political stance. It is based in Belgrade. Magazine published weekly on Mondays, web portal post daily news. The editor-in-chief of the magazine is Milorad Ivanović, the editor-in-chief of the web portal is Andjela Popović.
