= Abu Dhabi Secrets =

2023 investigative journalism project on alleged UAE influence operations

"Abu Dhabi Secrets" refers to a series of investigative reports published in 2023 by members of the European Investigative Collaborations and other media outlets, based on documents obtained from the 2021 hacking of the Swiss private intelligence company Alp Services. The investigations reported that Alp had been contracted by the United Arab Emirates (UAE) government to gather information on and discredit individuals and organizations in Europe who were alleged to be associated with Qatar or the Muslim Brotherhood.

According to the investigations, Alp compiled information on more than 1,000 individuals and 400 organizations in 18 European countries and passed their names and other data to Emirati intelligence services. The reported campaign included the dissemination of negative information through established media, social media and websites, as well as attempts to influence financial institutions. Several individuals and organizations were reportedly targeted on the basis of tenuous or false allegations.

The campaign was linked by the investigators to the political conflict between the UAE and Qatar, particularly the Qatar diplomatic crisis that began in 2017. The disclosures subsequently led to legal proceedings and investigations in several European countries and to lawsuits by some of the alleged targets.

The founder of Alp, Mario Brero, disputed the findings and, through his lawyers, stated that some of the leaked documents had been falsified and that many of the investigators' conclusions were based on false or imagined assumptions.

== Leak and investigations ==
On 29 March 2021, the computer of Mario Brero, owner of the Geneva-based private intelligence firm Alp Services, which specializes in "dark PR", was hacked by unknown perpetrators, who stole 1.5 million files and 8 million emails. The attackers initially tried to sell the data. Later, a portion of approximately 78,000 files related to an Alp operation for the United Arab Emirates (UAE) was passed on to journalists for free. Led by Mediapart journalist Yann Philippin, journalists from 13 different media outlets of the European Investigative Collaborations (EIC) network simultaneously investigated the available documents and, from 7 July 2023, published the coordinated results of their investigations under the title "Abu Dhabi Secrets". Prior to the EIC investigation, Mediapart and journalist David D. Kirkpatrick in The New Yorker magazine had already uncovered some details of the later findings in March 2023. Other media outlets published follow-up investigations.

According to these investigations, Alp Services was a hub in a network of individuals and institutions through which the UAE ran a large-scale discrediting campaign from 2017 onward. Indirectly, it targeted Qatar, the Emirates' neighboring state. Directly, it targeted individuals and institutions in 18 European countries, with ties to Qatar that were to be discredited in the course of the campaign by being accused of ties to terrorism. Members of the Muslim Brotherhood were particularly affected. At the same time, individuals and organizations were repeatedly discredited by falsely attributing to them connections or ideological affinity with the Muslim Brotherhood. Some individual campaigns were analyzed in greater detail by journalists. As an example, the campaign against Hazim Nada is detailed below.

Mario Brero did not comment on the findings of the investigations. His lawyers stated that the leaked documents were partly falsified and that "most of the facts" of the investigation were based on "false and/or imagined assumptions".

The more closely examined campaigns may represent only a fraction of the overall operation. For instance, there are no individual analyses for Belgium, where Alp targeted 160 individuals and 80 organizations, Italy, where the same applies to 136 individuals and organizations, or Norway, where Alp compiled a list of 47 individuals and several organizations as potential targets. Additionally, other known targets are not named in the EIC investigations, as most of those identified had requested anonymity from the investigators. Furthermore, the UAE campaign was not conducted through Alp and its contacts and associated organizations alone, but also through other actors. Some of these are briefly mentioned at the end of the article. However, due to the circumstances of the investigation, most publications on the Abu Dhabi Secrets focus on the activities of Alp.

== Political context ==
In recent times, the Muslim Brotherhood and related Islamist movements had been the strongest opposition force in several autocratic Arab states, including the UAE. In the course of the Arab Spring, they achieved unexpected electoral successes, particularly in Egypt, Tunisia and Morocco, leading several countries to crack down more decisively on these movements from 2013 onward. In 2013, the military in Egypt, under the leadership of Abdel Fattah el-Sisi, staged a coup against the new Muslim Brotherhood-led government. In the UAE, where – as in Saudi Arabia – the Muslim Brotherhood's call for a moderate, pro-democratic political Islam was seen as the greatest challenge to the ruling family's claim to power, then-Crown Prince Mohamed bin Zayed Al Nahyan banned the movement after the Arab Spring. Several tens of thousands of its members are imprisoned in autocratic countries. Being associated with the Muslim Brotherhood in these countries is therefore potentially dangerous.

In Qatar, by contrast, the Muslim Brotherhood was supported by the government. Since then, it has been at the center of a conflict between Qatar and the UAE (as well as Saudi Arabia and Egypt). The UAE and its allies accused Qatar of financing the Muslim Brotherhood with the goal of seizing power in other Arab states as well. Since the Muslim Brotherhood is not classified as a terrorist organization in any European country, the UAE sought to have it designated as such. The conflict between the UAE and Qatar culminated in the Qatar diplomatic crisis of 2017–2021.

Alp's first UAE project, codenamed "Operation Arnika", began in June 2017, a month after the Gulf states severed ties with Qatar.

== Contract between the UAE and Alp ==
The contact between the UAE and Alp had been established by former journalist Roland Jacquard, who had founded the non-governmental organization Observatoire international du terrorisme and is its sole member. On this basis, French media refer to him as an "Islamism expert". According to the leaked documents, Jacquard recommended Alp's founder Mario Brero to the Emiratis and was entitled to 10% of the payments, receiving at least €300,000 under his contract.

On the UAE side, the operation was overseen by Ali Saeed Al Neyadi, a ministerial-level aide to the Emirati politician Tahnoun bin Zayed Al Nahyan. Al Neyadi was officially listed as a board member of the National Emergency Crisis and Disaster Management Authority (NCEMA), while the investigations reported that he actually headed a group with direct links to the Supreme Council for National Security and the armed wing of the Emirati special operations forces. An intelligence officer working under him, identified by the code name "Matar", acted as Alp Services' main Emirati contact.

Alp offered to publish or influence 100 media articles a year in order to "terrorize the terrorists" and thereby destroy their reputations. A payment of between €20,000 and €50,000 was budgeted for each discredited individual. Three months after the first operation — known as Operation Arnika — began, the first contract between the UAE and Alp was signed. By 2021, Alp had received at least €5.7 million. The sender was an Emirati organization named Al Ariaf, which posed as a research center. According to the leaked data from 2021, a collaboration was planned to run from 2017 to 2025.

== Alp's approach ==
An Alp document outlined a three-step strategy: (1) publish discrediting articles, (2) mobilize journalists to spread them, and (3) use the publications to influence banks. At the same time, a positive campaign on behalf of the Emirates was also planned.

Steps (1) and (2) were examined in more detail by various teams of journalists. As an example of step (3), the campaign against Hazim Nada will serve as an illustration below.

=== Collection of discrediting information ===
Alp promised its clients that its operation would spread discrediting but "truthful" information about their targets. For this purpose, Operation Arnika compiled information on around 1,000 individuals and 400 institutions in a project file of the same name. All of them were alleged to be connected to the Muslim Brotherhood, and in some cases also to organizations classified as terrorist even in Europe. Their names and data were passed on to Emirati intelligence.

Some of these targets were indeed individuals convicted of terrorism. For the most part, however, inclusion in the file and the associated network maps was based on far-fetched associations, on rumors, or had no basis at all. French EIC journalists found that the primary criterion for inclusion was prior public allegations of ties to radical Islam in the press or on social media. Spanish journalist Begoña P. Ramírez showed, using several examples, that even marginal or fabricated connections were enough to qualify for inclusion.

Alp obtained information partly through honey traps, infiltration, phone surveillance, and access to targets' bank and phone records obtained under false identities, and also through cooperation with academics, most notably Lorenzo Vidino.

The UAE could then select primary targets from among the individuals and organizations compiled. For each of these, Alp then analyzed exactly how the target could be discredited. Priority was to be given to "financing, ties to terrorism, corruption, money laundering, or other crimes," but this also included embarrassing personal details — for instance, information about the private lives of mistresses, or lax religious practice.

=== Media campaigns ===
The Swiss media outlet Heidi News lists various media strategies Alp's staff used against targets to be discredited: writing their own articles on participatory media platforms — on Mediapart, for instance, under the fictitious account "Tanya Klein," which produced fifteen blog posts targeting Qatar and the Muslim Brotherhood between 2018 and 2021, and on Medium under the name "Farrah Ahmed" —, writing or altering Wikipedia articles, and commissioning freelance journalists.

The preferred method, however, was placing articles in established media through journalists, since this allowed Wikipedia articles to be influenced on a lasting basis. Around 200 cooperating journalists were grouped in Alp documents into three categories: those to whom information had to be leaked anonymously; those who could be openly fed information in the hope that they would use it — including journalist Sylvain Besson, who maintained a close exchange with Alp over several years — and five paid journalists who were said to have written articles or reports on commission and were listed as "subcontractors". Heidi lists four of them: the Swiss nationals Alain Jourdan, Kurt Pelda, and Ian Hamel, as well as the most prominent subcontractor, the Frenchman Louis de Raguenel, then editor-in-chief of Valeurs Actuelles, who, according to Alp data, also took part in research for Operation Arnika. The latter three deny this. Pelda and Hamel say they only carried out research.

In addition, Alp organized social media campaigns — for instance against the 2022 FIFA World Cup in Qatar under the hashtag "BOYCOTTQATAR2022" — as well as its own websites, including Muslim-Brotherhood-Watch.com, for which Alp created over 100 fake accounts, and a website promoting the Qatar-critical book InQarcéré, whose author Jean-Pierre Marongiu was also given funded flight tickets, media training, and introductions to journalists by Alp as part of "Operation Swann" to boost his profile.

=== Example: The campaign against Hazim Nada ===
Alp's first target — and also one of the cases that became known even before the coordinated publication of the Abu Dhabi Secrets investigations began — was the Italian Hazim Nada. Nada was one of the victims of Alp to whom the hackers had offered the data for sale (for $30 million) before passing it on to journalists. He had conducted his own investigations and was also the one who put Kirkpatrick on the trail of his New Yorker article.

Nada lived in the Italian border town of Como and ran the Swiss two-billion-dollar company LORD Energy on the other side of the border. His Egyptian-Italian father Youssef was an avowed member of the Muslim Brotherhood and had, in the past, played a significant political role within the movement. At the instigation of the United States, he had also been listed on terrorism lists for over ten years until 2015 as an alleged financier of al-Qaeda, without any grounds for this assessment ever being made public.

Unlike his father, Hazim Nada was, by his own account, not very religious and had little sympathy for the Muslim Brotherhood either. Kirkpatrick concludes from the Alp data that the idea of targeting Nada originated with journalist Sylvain Besson, who had previously written a book about Nada's father that is generally regarded in scholarship as conspiratorial. Based on the leak, Nada also accuses Lorenzo Vidino of having advised Alp regarding LORD Energy.

After publication of the Abu Dhabi Secrets investigations, Nada filed a lawsuit in February 2024 seeking at least $2.77 billion in damages from, among others, the UAE, Alp, and Vidino. The complaint quotes a six-step action plan against Nada from the Alp leak, which called for negative media articles, Wikipedia entries, targeted tip-offs to banks, and search engine optimization.

In line with this action plan, several articles about Nada and his company appeared starting in December 2017. The first was a report by Africa Intelligence, an outlet that, according to later investigations, cooperated with Alp on multiple occasions. It was followed, among others, by several pieces by freelance journalist Nina Mays on the participatory platform Medium, by a text written to Alp's precise specifications by Besson in the Swiss daily Le Temps (which also covered Alkarama and Femyso, two further campaign targets of Alp), and by a thematically related Wikipedia entry on LORD Energy. Six months after the media campaign began, Alp, under a false identity, wrote an email to the banking risk database World-Check expressing concerns about the company's ties to "radical Islamists". As a result, the company was briefly listed in the database under the risk category "terrorism". Despite the correction, banks and lenders subsequently no longer granted Nada sufficient credit. Four months later still, at the end of 2018, LORD Energy went bankrupt.

== Additional actors and campaigns ==
As noted, not only Alp and its partners were active on behalf of the UAE. For example, journalists Ilyes Ramdani and Antton Rouget reviewed a document leaked in 2026 that describes an action plan for Emirati influence on anti-Muslim Brotherhood sentiment in France. The journalists interpreted this as a further operation of the Emirati campaign, in which Alp was not involved.

About two other potential UAE collaborators, some more details are known:

=== Österreichische Gesellschaft für Politikanalyse ===
Reportedly also active for the UAE was the Österreichische Gesellschaft für Politikanalyse ("Austrian Society for Political Analysis", ÖGP), which had been operating for several years before Alp's contract was signed. According to Alp documents, its director, Ingo F., was in contact with a senior Emirati officer; a memo described the ÖGP as having conducted "the most successful UAE-influenced operation in Europe." Operations linked to the ÖGP include the Islam-Landkarte ("Islam Map"; originally created by the University of Vienna in 2012 but relaunched in 2021), the citizens' initiative Stop Extremism, and the website The Global Muslim Brotherhood Daily Watch. However, none of these operations were analyzed in detail by the EIC investigators.

=== Atmane Tazaghart ===
French-Algerian journalist Atmane Tazaghart also communicated with the same Emirati email contact as Alp. He allegedly shared information, such as claimed financial ties between François Fillon and Qatar. Mediapart investigators left open whether Tazaghart was part of the Alp campaign or operated independently on behalf of the UAE. Tazaghart stated in response to inquiries that he had no connection to Alp.

It is documented that, in addition to his email activity, Tazaghart signed a rights agreement on behalf of the shell company Countries Reports Publishing (CRP) for the translation rights to the Qatar-critical book Qatar Papers. The book's authors suspected Emirati funding behind CRP. According to La Lettre, CRP also funded Tazaghart's company Global Watch Analysis, which produced the Muslim Brotherhood-critical magazine Écran de veille and the web TV platform Elmaniya TV. In addition to Qatar Papers, Global Watch Analysis published several relevant works, including the French version of Lorenzo Vidino's book on the Muslim Brotherhood and an anthology featuring a contribution by Roland Jacquard (who was also communicated with the same email contact as Alp and Tazaghart). Tazaghart denied receiving foreign funding and stated that he had no connection to CRP as of at least 2023.

== Aftermath ==
As of 2025, at least eight legal proceedings were pending against the UAE government, Brero, Vidino, and/or other actors. These include a criminal case by the Swiss Federal Department of Foreign Affairs (FDFA), a criminal investigation by the Paris Public Prosecutor's Office, and a lawsuit for at least USD 2.77 billion filed by Hazim Nada in the United States.

The Belgian Ministry of Foreign Affairs summoned the Emirati ambassador.

Following the publication of the Abu Dhabi Secrets investigations, three George Washington University fellows resigned, citing Vidino's employment as incompatible with their values.

In mid-2026, journalist Emran Feroz warned that only the fraction of the UAE campaign related to the Alp operations had been addressed so far. Even from this fraction, disinformation spread by Alp was still circulating.
