= Mario Brero =

Swiss businessman (born 1946)

- Born: Mario Brero; 29 March 1946 (age 80)
- Occupation: Private detective
- Website: https://www.alpservices.com/ http://www.diligence.ch/ http://cadex.biz

Mario Brero (born March 29, 1946) is an Italian private detective heading five companies registered in Geneva, Switzerland. In 1989 he founded Alp Services SA, a private investigation business, focusing on banks, law firms and wealthy clients with "advice, support, strategic guidance, diplomatic intermediation and organisation in crisis management and image reputation" and with "national and international investigations and inquiries, notably commercial and financial, in combating money laundering, counterfeiting, parallel markets, economic and/or computer crime; surveillance and protection of individuals and companies, crisis and risk management, asset searches, due diligence, auditing.

Presented by the press as "detective" or even "spy", he became notorious through revelations about the cases his companies had handled and his controversial or even illegal methods. After his methods became public and he was sentenced by a French court in 2014, Alp services focused on reputation management by spreading negative information for his clients from the former Soviet Union, VIPs from small African states, and most notably the UAE, such that Le Monde called it a "destabilization and surveillance company".

In 2021, his firm was hacked and the results published in 2023 as Abu Dhabi Secrets, how Alp Services was contracted by the UAE government to spy on citizens of 18 countries in Europe and beyond. Alp Services sent the names of more than 1000 individuals and 400 organizations in 18 European countries to the UAE intelligence services, labelling them as part of the Muslim Brotherhood network. In 2021, Brero was also convicted of coercion.

== Early life and education ==
Mario Brero was born on March 29, 1946. He has represented himself as a graduate of the École Polytechnique Fédérale de Lausanne. EPFL archives solely mention his enrollment to a specialized mathematics class between 1967 and 1968, where he only studied for one semester.

== Early career ==
In 1986, Brero exported computers and semiconductor manufacturing equipment from the United States to the Eastern Bloc through Switzerland. In 1988, The US government investigated Brero and his company Samata SA and concluded that Brero had participated in the scheme to re-export computers and semiconductor manufacturing equipment. According to the Federal register, these were national security goods under a privileged export ban by the US Bureau of Export Administration. Brero denied the charges, but agreed to stop the business following revocation of his distribution licenses.

== Alp Services ==
In 1989, influenced by Jules Kroll's international corporate-investigation business, he founded Alp Services in Geneva, according to Le Monde initially as a subcontractor for Kroll, focusing on banks, law firms and wealthy clients.

In 2011, Anne Lauvergeon, the former head of the mining division at the French nuclear group Areva, received an anonymous report containing information on UraMin, a company acquired by Areva, information about Lauvergeon's husband Oliver Fric, their banking details, information about their travel in Geneva and a list of telephone numbers they had called. This document came from Alp Services. In December 2011, Lauvergon filed a complaint against Brero for illegal wiretapping. After investigation, the public prosecutor's office decided to bring Brero before the criminal court of Paris for "complicity of violation of professional secrecy" and "concealment of violation of professional secrecy" to the detriment of Olivier Fric. The trial was held in 2014. During his hearing Brero revealed he had paid phone-company employees to disclose her and her husbands call information. Brero was convicted but only received a suspended sentence.

Despite not receiving a substantial judgement, Brero's actions drove away many above-board firms and increasing the number of less-scrupulous clients: oligarchs from the former Soviet Union, other billionaires from Eastern Europe, VIPs from small African states like Gabon, and the Middle East. Alp Services under Brero started focusing on spreading negative information, which he called "offensive viral communication campaigns". For example, in 2012 Brero worked for Prince Albert of Monaco to smear Robert Eringer, former head of Monegasque intelligence services. This was accomplished by having false information about Eringer added to his Wikipedia entry sourced to a blog from a fake individual claiming to be an expert in psychology. Brero also hired hackers to get confidential banking information, and used honey traps, during his operations. From 2015 to 2017, Alp Services's fees were nearly 6 million Swiss francs.

In 2014, following a meeting between Brero and Gennady Timchenko, the Russian businessman and billionaire behind the trading company Gunvor, Alp Services wrote a "strictly confidential" report on the signing of contracts between Gunvor and Congo, leading to the prosecution of several Gunvor employees for corruption.

In 2021, Alp Services was hacked, and an investigation of the leaked data was published in early 2023 by the European Investigative Collaborations under the name "Abu Dhabi Secrets".

=== Abu Dhabi Secrets ===
In March 2023, the Abu Dhabi Secrets, two major investigations into the missions conducted by Alp Services SA, were published in the French, American, Suisse, German, Spanish and Dutch press. According to Médiapart, Brero's companies have "notably carried out private intelligence missions on behalf of the Emirati intelligence services" and have also "disseminated information - under false identities on the Internet - with the aim of harming adversaries of the Emirates, mainly Qatar and the Muslim Brotherhood."

Brero provided documents and photos in the context of a trivial labor dispute that revealed information about Alp Services' business providers and clients, including a secret Emirati agent. In March 2023, his name was made public by the American journalist and Pulitzer Prize winner David D. Kirkpatrick for The New Yorker - as Matar Humaid al-Neyadi and his superior Ali Saeed al-Neyadi. It was possible to identify the two Emirati secret service agents because of the photos taken discreetly by Brero during meetings with his clients.

Among Brero's targets, journalists mention Sihem Souid - former policewoman and socialist ministerial advisor, now a communicator and lobbyist for Qatar in France - whose Paris house was photographed by Brero's agents, just before it was broken into; the reputation and business intelligence consultancy Avisa Partners; Hazim Nada and his oil trading company Lord Energy SA; the association Islamic Relief Worldwide; the Tunisian politician Kamel Jendoubi.

Former journalist Roland Jacquard, a self-professed expert on extremism of European Muslims passed himself off in his communications with the Emirati secret services as an adviser to Emmanuel Macron, recommended to the Emirati secret service to hire Brero in their competition with Qatar and the Muslim Brotherhood. When in August, 2017, Brero persuaded the Emiratis to hire him to deliver the "power of dark PR" with "an initial four-to-six-month budget of a million and a half euros", Jacquard received his commission. Brero offered to attack Tariq Ramadan, to smear Youssef Nadas son Hazim Nada, as well as the Forum of European Muslim Youth and Student Organization. Alp employees created damning Wikipedia entries and lobbied World-Check about Nada's alleged "ties to terrorism" eventually ruining his business. Brero recruited mainstream journalists Ian Hamel, Louis de Raguenel, and scholars like Lorenzo Vidino, paying the latter €13,000 . In 2019, Brero attacked Islamic Relief Worldwide by feeding information to Andrew Norfolk, of the London Times, accusing one member Heshmat Khalifa to be a terrorist, so eventually the German government stopped working with Islamic Relief. Targets also included Sihem Souid, a public-relations consultant for Qatar and Kamel Jendoubi, a human-rights advocate. Between 2017 and 2021, Alp Services collected personal data on more than one thousand people in Switzerland and Europe, charging the Emirati secret services nearly six million euros for the information.

Brero's methods within the framework of his mandate included infiltration, honey trapping, access to the bank and telephone records of his targets by impersonating them, reconnaissance and surveillance, publication of false press articles on anonymous blogs and the use of false identities to relay the content of these publications to the traditional press. The revelations of The New Yorker and Médiapart also concern the way Brero treats his own clients: recordings of sensitive telephone conversations, photos taken secretly and presented to the courts spontaneously, provision of email accounts with the possibility to consult them without the clients' consent.

=== The Bouvier Affair ===
Mario Brero and his companies were hired by Yves Bouvier to help him win a series of legal battles related to the Bouvier Affair, that began in January 2015. The Russian oligarch Dmitry Rybolovlev accused Bouvier of defrauding him of almost one billion Swiss francs when he bought 38 paintings for a total of 2 billion euros.

According to Heidi.news, Rybolovlev's camp identified Brero and Alp Services as the driving force behind Bouvier's defence. Over the months, a series of lawsuits were filed against the detective in Geneva, Monaco, Nice and Paris. Some of them led to Mario Brero's conviction, as in July 2015 in Geneva, for slander. The attachments of the messages from Mario Brero's Protonmail account hacked in 2021 contained a recorded conversation between Brero and his lawyers concerning the possibility of selling the research carried out on behalf of Bouvier to the opposing camp of Rybolovlev.

=== The Affair in Spain: ex-mistress of Juan Carlos I ===
A leak of information from Alp Services, revealed in 2021 by Heidi.news, showed that Mario Brero instigated press articles designed to ruin the reputation of Geneva prosecutor Yves Bertossa at the request of Corinna Larsen, known to have been the mistress of Spanish King Juan Carlos I.

According to El Pais and The Times, Larsen signed the contract with Alp Services shortly after Swiss prosecutor Bertossa charged her in 2018 with an alleged money laundering crime. The case concerns the €65 million donation Larsen received in 2012 from Spain's King Juan Carlos I, who in turn had received it in 2008 from Saudi Arabia's Ministry of finance.

Larsen has also commissioned Brero to carry out an in-depth investigation into 14 businessmen who were friends or 'front men' of former Spanish King Juan Carlos I.

== Judicial proceedings ==
Following the leaks and subsequent media coverage, authorities in Switzerland and France have initiated investigations against Mario Brero and Alp Services. These investigations aim to address the potential legal violations and ethical breaches involved in the firm's operations.

According to information from Agence France-Presse (AFP), Mediapart, and Radio Télévision Suisse (RTS), French and Swiss prosecutors have launched three judicial investigations targeting Alp Services SA and its directors, Mario Brero and Muriel Cavin. They are suspected of conducting covert operations in Europe for the secret services of the United Arab Emirates (UAE).

The journalist, author, and director, Rokhaya Diallo, filed a complaint for “illicit collection, processing and disclosure of personal data” after she was associated with the Muslim Brotherhood. In 2023, following Diallo’s complaint, the Paris prosecutor’s office opened a preliminary investigation targeting Alp Services SA.

Following the Abu Dhabi Secrets, in December 2023, the Swiss Federal Prosecutor's Office (MPC) brought together several open procedures into a single investigation, suspecting Mario Brero and his associate Muriel Cavin of committing six crimes. The investigation revealed that an Emirati research center, Al Ariaf, was paying Alp Services SA. In addition, Brero and Cavin also had fictitious employment contracts with Al Ariaf.

Another legal complaint against Alp Services was filed in Washington by Farid Hafez. In October 2023, Zakia Khattabi, the Belgian Minister for Climate and the Environment, filed a complaint for slander and libel against Alp Services.

According to The New Yorker, on January 24, 2024, Hazim Nada, an American citizen, filed a lawsuit against Mario Brero, Muriel Cavin, and the United Arab Emirates in the U.S. district court in Washington, D.C. The complaint notes that the rulers of the United Arab Emirates conducted their campaign by hiring Alp Services to crush his company, Lord Energy, for commercial reasons. Alleging a conspiracy to commit fraud, to spread false and derogatory information about Lord Energy, and to manipulate markets, the suit seeks $2.7 billion in damages and compensation.

According to Le Temps, Alp Services SA has never declared its mandates to the Federal Department of Foreign Affairs since the Federal Act on Private Security Services Provided Abroad (PSSA) came into effect. Tariq Ramadan filed a complaint in July 2023, claiming he was surveilled and defamed. In September 2023, the Export Controls and Private Security Services Section (ECPS) led by Martina Gasser reported Alp Services SA to the federal prosecutor. The Money Laundering Reporting Office also flagged the agency. A federal investigation was opened for violations of the LPSP and potential espionage. The investigation focuses on a breach of the obligation to declare activities and collaborate with the DFAE. Additional charges involve acts carried out unlawfully on behalf of a foreign state and espionage, punishable under the Swiss Penal Code. Those targeted include Mario Brero, Muriel Cavin, Alp Services SA, and Diligence Ltd. The Office of the Attorney General of Switzerland (MPC) confirms that four procedures are ongoing.

== Corporate culture at Mario Brero's companies ==
According to The New Yorker, Brero cultivates an appealing work environment, but treats past employees abjectly. A former employee also stated that Brero "wanted to have files on everyone". In 2021, Brero was convicted by the Switzerland's Criminal Court of coercing a departing employee into signing a document. The victim stated that spyware existed on all the employees' workstations.
