= Mining industry of Burkina Faso =

Gold mining often plays a significant role in Burkina Faso’s economy. Burkina Faso has become Africa's 4th biggest producer of gold in 2012. Production of mineral commodities is limited to cement, dolomite, gold, granite, marble, phosphate rock, pumice, other volcanic materials, and salt.

Burkina Faso has undergone significant changes in fiscal policy regarding gold mining as the country focuses on the nationalization of industrial resources. Since the new mining code established in 2024, Burkina Faso has increased state ownership in the mining industry, increased regulation of mining corporations, and reduced tax benefits for companies in the mining sector.

Child slavery is commonplace in the gold industry. Mining accidents are not uncommon, with one of the most prominent cases being when eight miners were trapped underground in the Canadian-owned zinc mine in Perkoa by flood waters. The unexpected flooding happened during dry season at Burkina Faso on 16 April 2022. While other workers have evacuated safely, the 8 missing workers were working below level 520 or 520 meters from the surface.

== Structure of the mineral industry ==
As of 2006, companies exploring for gold in Burkina Faso include Goldrush Resources, Gryphon Minerals Ltd, Orbis Gold Limited and Golden Rim Resources (2010) of Australia, Cluff Gold plc and Randgold Resources Ltd. of the United Kingdom, and Canadian companies Channel Resources Ltd., Etruscan Resources, Goldbelt Resources Ltd., High River Gold Mines Ltd., Orezone Gold Corporation., Riverstone Resources Inc., and Societe Semafo. Etruscan also explores in Burkina Faso for copper.

== Commodities ==
=== Gold ===
In 2012, there were hundreds of gold mines in Burkina Faso, most of them small-scale. Burkina Faso is the 3rd biggest site for gold exploration in Africa and 4th biggest gold producer in Africa. West African gold is not as high grade as gold from South Africa.

Cluff updated its bankable feasibility study for the Kalsaka gold project, which is located about 150 km northwest of the country’s capital, Ouagadougou. Measured resources were estimated to be 6.5 million metric tons (Mt) at a grade of 1.6 grams per metric ton (g/t) gold, and indicated resources were estimated to be 2.7 Mt at a grade of 1.2 g/t gold. Following the completion of the bankable feasibility study, the company decided to continue with the development of the project and to bring it into production. In October, Ghana-based Banlaw Africa Ltd. was appointed as the mining contractor. Cluff held a 78% interest in the project; the remaining was held by IMARB Indústria Metalúrgica of Brazil (12%) and the Government (10%).

Etruscan continued with construction work activities at its 90% owned Youga gold property, which is located about 180 km southeast of Ouagadougou. Gold reserve estimates at the Youga Mine were reported to be 6.6 Mt at an average grade of 2.7 g/t gold. Commissioning of the mine was scheduled for mid-2007, and production was expected to be about 2,700 kilograms per year (kg/yr). As of November 30, 2006, the company had invested about $21.7 million in the project, had made purchase commitments of about $7 million for equipment and services, and had made additional purchase commitments of about $10.2 million for ongoing development activities.

High River continued with the construction of the Taparko-Boroum open pit gold mine and mill facilities, which are located about 200 km northeast of Ouagadougou. The mine’s first gold pour was scheduled for the second quarter of 2007. Initial production was expected to be about 3,100 kg/yr and to reach about 4,400 kg/yr by 2008. Measured and indicated resources were estimated to be about 12.6 Mt of ore at a grade of 2.77 g/t gold. The Taparko-Boroum Mine and mill would be operated by High River’s subsidiary Société des Mines de Taparko (Somita S.A.). High River held a 90% interest in the project, and the government held the remaining 10%. In addition to Taparko-Boroum, High River held other exploration licenses in the country, including the 1,000-km2 Bissa Group permits, which are located about 80 km north of Ouagadougou. Measured and indicated resources for the Bissa Group were estimated to be about 12 Mt of ore at a grade of 1.72 g/t gold. The company invested about $2 million in exploration in 2006 and planned to invest an additional $8 million in 2007 to test identified target areas at the Bissa Group properties.

Gold mining in Burkina Faso continues to grow rapidly, with more than fifteen major discoveries made since 2006. With this has come increasing amounts of merger and acquisition activity and more explorers flocking to the region.

In 2017 junior mining company Nexus Gold began district-scale exploration of the Niangouela and Bouboulou gold concessions, which are located within the Boromo greenstone belt of north-central Burkina Faso. The belt is host to several active gold mines.

According to the Ministry of Finance, gold has become the top export commodity. In 2011, it earned Burkina Faso 127 billion CFA (US$247 million). Between 2007 and 2011, it brought in 440 billion CFA, accounting for 64.7 percent of all exports and 8 percent of GDP. Production rose from 23 tonnes in 2010 to 32 tonnes in 2011. Gold mines are spread across the country's northern, western, southwestern and central regions.

==== Fiscal Policy ====
From 2023 to 2025, Burkina Faso has seen annual increase in GDP growth, the highest since the 2010 to 2019 period. In the last decade, climate change and environmental factors have led to a reduction in the size of the agriculture sector in Burkina Faso The mining sector has grown since 2015 in its absence, especially gold. Despite declines in productivity from gold mines from 2022 to 2024, the sector represents an increasing share of Burkina Faso's GDP, accounting for 17% at the end of 2024 according to the World Bank Group.

Coinciding with gold's growing economic importance, the current government of Burkina Faso, led by Captain Ibrahim Traore, has pursued state ownership of privately owned mines within its borders. In September 2024, it was announced that the Boungou and Wahgnio mines would be nationalized, with a payment to be made to Endeavour Mining of $60mn in cash. By June 2025, the state had legally transferred several foreign-owned mining assets to government control, the stated goal being to "optimize exploitation for the benefit of the population".

This effort to nationalize foreign-owned entities follows Mali and Niger's growing push for independence from Western institutions since 2020. Mali, Niger, and Burkina Faso formed the Alliance of Sahel States in 2023 to foster greater autonomy for member countries outside of Western political structures. A few years later in 2023, Burkina Faso enacted myriad fiscal policies reconfiguring the mining industry. These policies raise the minimum state ownership in mining companies by 5%, abolishes preferential tax rate for corporations in certain sectors, and redirects revenue from mining toward "communal development" and the establishment of a national gold reserve.

==== Illegal Labor Practices in Gold Mining Industry ====
A recent report from publication AllAfrica revealed that the recent boom in the country’s gold mining industry in the last three years has made the country one of Africa’s leading producers and also asserted that it was luring a whole generation into the sector for work. Children as young as six were reported to have left school in order to work in the mines – mainly artisanal ones where they crush stones, sieve dust and transport water around the site. Children are even visiting mines on their days off from school, influenced by their parents who have made money there.

Burkina Faso's gold industry employs slave laborers and does not spare children. In 2013, the U.S. Department of Labor reported that gold mining becoming an even more fruitful industry, it has resulted in "an increased number of children working in gold mines and thousands of students leaving school."

A December 2014 report further corroborates the fact that child labor and forced labor are common practices in Burkina Faso's mining industry. The mentioned DOL report contains a List of Goods Produced by Child Labor or Forced Labor and Burkina Faso is listed among 74 other countries where such labor conditions have been observed.

=== Zinc ===
Aim Resources Ltd. (AIM) of Australia continued with the development of the Perkoa zinc deposit, which is located about 120 km west of Ouagadougou. In December 2005, Snowden Mining Industry Consultants completed a bankable feasibility study for Perkoa. Production was expected to be about 130,000 t/yr of concentrate at a grade of 53% zinc. Overall zinc recovery to concentrate was projected to be 93%, and contained zinc production, to average 68,000 t/yr; zinc concentrates would be transported by railway to the port of Abidjan in Ivory Coast and by road to the port of Tema in Ghana. The first shipment of zinc concentrate was expected to be delivered in 2008. In its 2006 annual report, AIM announced that it had signed letters of intent with Louis Dreyfus Commodities Metals Suisse S.A., Votorantim Metais of Brazil, and Switzerland-based Xstrata plc to finalize offtake agreements for the production of zinc concentrates from Perkoa. Xstrata planned to process Perkoa concentrates through either the San Juan de Nieva zinc smelter in Spain or the Nordenham zinc smelter in Germany. According to AIM company reports, the government had upgraded the road that leads to the mine and had constructed a dam that would provide water for the project. As of yearend, measured and indicated mineral resources at Perkoa were estimated to be 6.72 Mt at grades of 16.4% zinc and 35.4 g/t silver at a 5% zinc cutoff grade.

In February 2006, Semafo awarded the engineering, procurement, and construction contract for the development of the Mana gold mine to Genviar Consulting Group Inc. According to the company’s 2006 annual report, measured resources were estimated to be about 2.1 Mt at a grade of 1.99 g/t gold and indicated resources were estimated to be 2.5 Mt at a grade of 2.03 g/t gold. Average production, which was expected to begin in late 2007, was estimated to be about 3,900 kg/yr of gold for the first 3 years and about 3,000 kg/yr for the remaining life of the mine. The company approved a $3.5 million budget for the project for 2007.
