= UraMin =

Uranium mining exploration

- Industry: Uranium mining exploration
- Founded: February 25, 2005
- Fate: Acquired by Areva (Since 2007)
- Total equity: Toronto Stock Exchange

UraMin is a Canadian company involved in uranium mining exploration, listed on the Toronto Stock Exchange since December 2006, and acquired by the French multinational Areva (now Orano) on June 15, 2007, for 1.8 billion euros, to secure its uranium supply.

In 2006, the price of nuclear fuel rose sharply. Over the winter, Uramin buys uranium deposits in Africa, but in 2008 these proved to be inoperable. This contributed to Areva's difficulties, as it found itself short of fuel for its customers, especially as the price of uranium finally fell in 2011, causing Uramin to lose all its value.

Areva's 2007 takeover bid for Uramin marked the beginning of the "UraMin affair". The press revealed this politico-financial scandal involving French, Canadian, and African entrepreneurs and politicians in the early 2010s. The intelligence services, the French National Assembly, the Cour des Comptes, and the French justice system investigated various aspects of the case. Gradually, revelations of espionage, corruption, fraud, and conflicts of interest accumulated in the press.

Including losses, Uramin cost Areva over 3 billion euros. Areva CEO Anne Lauvergeon was dismissed in 2011.

Uranium deposits owned by Uramin

== History ==
=== 2005: Creation of Uramin Inc. ===
On December 20, 2004, the French company "Cogema Développement 1" was created, to become the holding company Uramin Holding.

On February 25, 2005, Uramin Inc. was incorporated in the British Virgin Islands (a UK tax haven). Uramin was created by Stephen Dattels and James Mellon, owners of uranium deposits in Africa listed on the London and Toronto markets. Stephen Dattels is one of the founders of mining company Barrick Gold. The Quebec newspaper La Presse traced him to two other stock market operations that went awry. James Mellon, co-founder of Uramin, had already been prosecuted by financial prosecutors in South Korea.

In May 2005, Stephen Dattels and his associates secured the rights to Trekkopje by purchasing Gulf Western Trading Namibia from businessman George Christodoulou for $30. million. Thousands of American investors, including stars Elvis Presley, Johnny Carson and Alice Cooper, believe they were cheated in an allegedly fraudulent project by Christodoulou in Namibia in the late 1970s.

In October 2005, Stephen Dattels acquired 6,000 ha around the Ryst Kuil deposit in South Africa for $1 million.

=== 2006: IPO and speculation ===
Uramin was floated on the high-risk London Stock Exchange in April 2006.

In May 2006, Uramin acquired three new mining licenses for $27 million a few kilometers north of Bakouma in the Central African Republic.

In 2006, Olivier Fric, a consultant specializing in energy issues and Anne Lauvergeon's husband, passed on the curriculum vitae of Belgian financier Daniel Wouters, who was subsequently hired in April by Areva as head of development and acquisitions for its mining division to act as an intermediary in the takeover of Canadian company UraMin. According to the daily newspaper Libération, Daniel Wouters is financially linked to Uramin shareholders Mellon and Dattels.

Estimates of Uramin's deposits were initially carried out by SRK Consulting, a consulting firm commissioned by UraMin to audit its reserves.

On October 17, 2006, Uramin proposed to Areva CEO Anne Lauvergeon that it be bought out for $471 million. However, Mrs. Lauvergeon did not immediately respond to this offer. At the end of October, Mrs. Lauvergeon received a letter from Samuel Jonah, chairman of the Board of Directors of UraMin, putting an end to the discussions and suggesting that she contact him again in early 2007.

On October 22, 2006, in Canada, the Cigar Lake mine (the world's second-largest uranium mine, 37% owned by Areva) flooded for the second time in a row, for the same reasons that the McArthur uranium mine13 had been blocked for six months in April 2003: the artificial protective ice wall was not enough to block the moisture coming from underground. Uranium prices soared.

In December 2006, eight months after listing on the London Stock Exchange, Uramin was listed on the Toronto Stock Exchange.

=== 2007: acquisition of UraMin ===
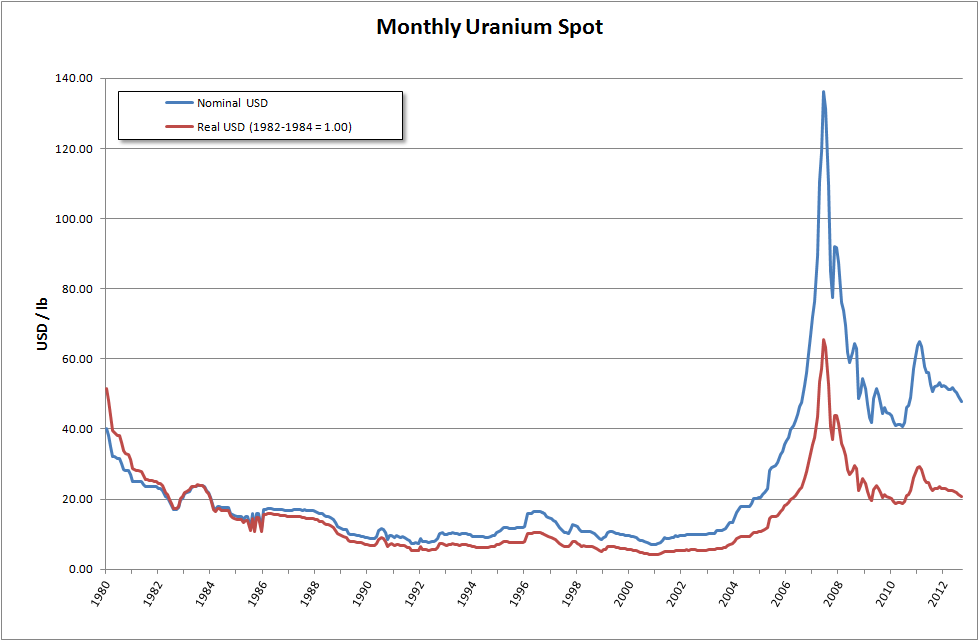
Spot uranium prices between 1980 and 2012

Following the IPO in December 2006, Uramin's share price was the subject of intense speculation in the spring of 2007. The reason for this was a flurry of promises and declarations by the two owners. In just a few months, the share price tripled.

In 2007, the spot price of uranium hit an all-time high ($135 per pound) due to a "uranium shortage that could hit nuclear power plants in the next thirty to forty years", but quickly fell below $100 after the acquisition of UraMin in the summer of 2007, then below $50 following the Fukushima nuclear accident in March 2011.

UraMin, a young Canadian start-up in 2007, had never mined uranium before. Its assets consisted of projects, many of which had been identified by French entities (CEA, Cogema, etc.) that were gradually merged into Areva.

UraMin's properties are located in 5 African countries:

- Namibia (Trekkopje uranium mine, UraMin's main deposit, whose uranium content was initially estimated at 90,000 tonnes, then revised downwards to 45,000 tonnes, then 26,000 tonnes);
- in the Central African Republic (Bakouma uranium deposit); the Bakouma deposit was initially discovered in 1947 by the French Atomic Energy Commission (CEA), when the Central African Republic was a French colony within the federation of French Equatorial Africa;
- South Africa: Ryst Kuil project, 30 km southeast of Beaufort West.
- Senegal (Saraya), 80 km northwest of Faléa (Mali)
- in Niger (Kamas, 75 km north of Arlit, and Dabala, 40 km northeast of Maradi).

These projects had been abandoned by their inventors, who considered them unprofitable. URAMIN was able to add these assets to its portfolio at a very low cost. However, the company was acquired by the Areva group in the summer of 2007 at a very high price.

In March 2007, Areva first announced the purchase of 5.5% of Uramin's capital, causing the share price to soar, before buying the entire company three months later for $2.5 billion.

On May 2, 2007, between the two rounds of the 2007 presidential election, Areva executives reached an agreement in London with the sellers of Uramin to set the timetable for the takeover bid. The decision was taken under the authority of Anne Lauvergeon, with the a priori approval of the Agence des participations de l'État (APE, which holds 87% of Areva's capital), and at a time when Luc Oursel (future Chairman of Areva) was already present (since March 2007) on the (Areva) Management Board, which he joined in January 2007. On June 15, Areva announced that the purchase had been completed for $2.5 billion (€1.8 billion).

Areva had been prevented from acquiring the Australian giant Olympic Dam and had been unable to acquire Summit Resources, but the deal went ahead. It was carried out with relative urgency, Areva arguing that "UraMin has set May 31, 2007 as the deadline for a transaction to purchase its shares"; on June 15, 2007, "Areva announced a tender offer for Uramin based on a price of US$7.7 per share, representing an attractive premium excluding dividends of 21% over the 20-day weighted average share price as of June 8, 2007. Areva's press release states that UraMin's Board of Directors considered the offer "to be in the best interests of [its] shareholders". The price paid by Areva was therefore around ten times higher than UraMin's share price six months earlier.

On January 2, 2008, Sébastien de Montessus became Chairman of Uramin Holding, a société par actions simplifiée (simplified joint-stock company) based on rue La Fayette (Paris), as well as Director of the Areva Group's Mining Business Unit.

=== 2008: Areva's first difficulties ===
In 2008, Areva's partner China Guangdong Nuclear Power Company (CGNPC) was due to buy 49% of UraMin, but this never happened. However, CGNPC is said to have made direct access to uranium supplies a condition of the purchase of the EPR reactors (Taishan nuclear power plant).

Until March 2008, no Areva employees were allowed to visit Uramin sites in the Central African Republic, which was contesting the acquisition of Uramin's local subsidiary, Uramin CAR. The Central African Republic demanded 250 million euros from Areva for access to the deposit. This is why, in April 2008, Belgian entrepreneur George Forrest and Patrick Balkany, deputy mayor (UMP) of Levallois-Perret (Hauts-de-Seine), acted as intermediaries in Areva's purchase of UraMin's Central African uranium mines. On August 1, 2008, Anne Lauvergeon signed an amendment to the Bakouma mining concession contract, committing the company to pay forty million dollars to the Central African state.

=== 2009: French secret service investigation ===
According to geopolitical expert Vincent Crouzet, the Direction Centrale du Renseignement Intérieur (DCI) began investigating the Uramin case as early as 2009, interviewing Pakistani businessman Saïfee Durbar, who had been asked by Central African President François Bozizé to look into the Uramin affair.

On October 28, 2009, Vincent Crouzet met with Saïfee Durbar at his home in London (Ilchester Place, near Holland Park) and spoke at length with him about the Uramin affair.

=== 2010: launch of a government audit ===
In February 2010, Admiral Thierry d'Arbonneau, Areva's Director of Safety, recruited Marc Eichinger, a business intelligence expert with the consulting firm Assistance Petroleum International Capital (APIC), to investigate the Uramin takeover. The investigation report was delivered on April 10, 2010, to the office of Areva's safety director, and concluded that the deal was "highly dubious and potentially fraudulent".

In April 2010, the French state shareholder was alarmed and appointed René Ricol (a chartered accountant) to chair the audit committee of Areva's supervisory board, and to clarify accounts deemed lacking in transparency, notably concerning the recent acquisition of UraMin. He "made provisions of 426 million euros in 2010 for UraMin uranium quantities, and included a paragraph in the notes to the annual financial statements referring to chemical tests that were not very good".

On April 16, 2010, Anne Lauvergeon and Hage Geingob, Minister of Trade and Industry of the Republic of Namibia, inaugurated Namibia's first seawater desalination plant, located near the Trekkopje site. Designed to supply water to Areva's future mine, the plant cost $250 million to build.

=== 2011: French parliamentary audit and suspension of projects in Africa ===
On February 2, 2011, Sébastien de Montessus met with Swiss detective Mario Brero at the Kempinski Hotel in Geneva to commission him to investigate the Uramin takeover, and in particular Anne Lauvergeon and her husband Olivier Fric.

On April 23, 2011, Paris Match revealed that "the African deposits of subsidiary UraMin have still not produced a single gram of uranium".

On June 21, 2011, the French National Assembly launched a financial audit of EDF and Areva, to examine the terms of the Uramin takeover. Member of Parliament Marc Goua expressed surprise that Areva had not detected the overvaluation of resources announced by UraMin. He was astonished that "the Agence des participations de l'État, which was initially very cautious about the dossier, considered it a great victory in July 2007", but a few months later, Areva had to make provisions of 2.36 billion in its budget to settle its debts. The audit found no trace of illegal interest-taking, but based on the names of UraMin shareholders (confidential), it was considered possible that they were trust companies operating in the tax haven where UraMin was based.

At the end of October 2011, Sébastien de Montessus, then head of mining at Areva, travelled to Bangui to inform Central African President François Bozizé that the Bakouma uranium mine project had been frozen.

On December 13, 2011, Areva announced that it was suspending its investments in uranium mining projects at Ryst Kuil in South Africa and the Trekkopje uranium mine in Namibia. After investing 1 billion euros in the Trekkopje mine's infrastructure - including a seawater desalination plant - Areva announces the mine's closure due to lack of economic profitability. Areva's supervisory board also announced that it had launched an internal investigation into the UraMin takeover "to examine the conditions under which UraMin was acquired and operated, and to draw lessons for the Group"; the investigation will be conducted by three "independent" members of the board, aiming for a conclusion by early 2012.

At the end of 2011, Areva's takeover of Uramin was the subject of controversy, before proving to be a source of heavy financial losses. A further 80% write-down of the mining company's value took place because the deposit turned out to be less rich in uranium than announced, and due to a drop in uranium prices, particularly after the Fukushima nuclear accident.

At the same time, Luc Oursel, newly appointed Chairman of Areva's management board in June 2011, commissioned lawyer Jean Reinhart to produce a report on the UraMin fiasco.

=== Secret wars and Swiss spies ===
In December 2011, several French media outlets revealed that Anne Lauvergeon had filed a complaint for "complicity and concealment in the violation of professional secrecy".

Sébastien de Montessus, head of the group's mining division, and a number of Areva executives had allegedly commissioned an investigation into the circumstances surrounding the Uramin transaction, and in particular the murky role played by Anne Lauvergeon's husband, Olivier Fric. The investigation resulted in a 15-page report entitled "Pomerol 4", which was delivered "by an anonymous hand" to Anne Lauvergeon, who then discovered its existence.

Anne Lauvergeon files a complaint in Paris against the Swiss investigation company, its director Mario Brero and Sébastien de Montessus46. She believes she is the victim of a plot to destabilize her, orchestrated by a handful of executives - chief among them Areva's Mining Director, Sébastien de Montessus - to oust her.

According to information on the "Pomerol 4" report published in the press, the telephone numbers dialed by Olivier Fric "include that of a banker working for Liechtenstein Global Trust (LGT) and those of other banks, Clariden Leu and Crédit Suisse. Not enough to support suspicions of illicit enrichment through the purchase of Uramin, but enough to "suggest that Mr. Fric holds assets hidden illegally in Switzerland".

== 2012: South Africa revelations and spy scandal ==
=== Areva and the corruption of the South African regime ===
Uramin's main shareholder - he holds 26% - is Samuel Esson Jonas. This Ghanaian businessman, knighted by the Queen of England, sits on some boards, including that of Vodafone, where he met Anne Lauvergeon.

A well-documented article, the Mail On Guardian, a reference in the South African press, details how the clan of South African President Thabo Mbeki had been largely fuelled by the sale of Uramin. At the time of the Uramin sale, the President of South Africa was dangling a huge nuclear power plant construction contract worth over 100 billion euros in front of Areva. A surprising detail is that Areva's Anne Lauvergeon and Uramin's Ghanaian Sam Jonah sat together on the International Investment Council, the body appointed by Thabo Mbeki to steer South Africa's economic policy.

At the time, Areva was battling fiercely against Toshiba-Westinghouse to sell Pretoria 2 nuclear reactors (3,500 MW), while additional reactors of up to 20,000 MW were being discussed.

According to an anonymous Uramin witness quoted in the South African newspaper:

"The deal was for Areva to buy Uramin and win the tender in return. Areva was paying too much for Uramin - which was worth half as much. But the French group was going to win contracts for reactors and an enrichment plant, worth ten times as much."

=== Evacuation of the Bakouma site ===
At the end of June 2012, the Lord's Resistance Army attacked Areva's Bakouma site in the Central African Republic. On September 21, 2012, Areva definitively evacuated the Bakouma site and 150 workers were laid off.

=== 2013: sale of the South African deposit ===
In December 2013, Areva sold its mining rights at Ryst Kuil to Australian company Peninsula Energy Ltd for $5 million.

=== 2014: new disclosures ===
On April 4, 2014, writer Vincent Crouzet published a Roman à clef entitled Radioactive, in which he recounts a story similar to Areva's purchase of Uramin, during which kickbacks were obtained by the imaginary company Murena (Areva).

On April 10, 2014, journalists Gérard Davet and Fabrice Lhomme published an article in the daily Le Monde revealing that the National Financial Prosecutor's Office (PNF) had opened an investigation into Anne Lauvergeon's suspicious purchase of UraMin.

In May 2014, a pre-report by the French Cour des Comptes on Areva's management under Anne Lauvergeon highlighted "the concentration of real power in the hands of the CEO".

On May 16, 2014, Mario Brero and Sébastien de Montessus were summoned to appear before the 17th Chamber of the Correctional Court to explain themselves. At the end of a day of theatrical hearings, Sébastien de Montessus is acquitted in full, while Mario Brero is acquitted of all charges.

On June 3, 2014, as part of an investigation into the takeover of Uramin, police officers carried out a dozen searches at Areva and the home of its former president Anne Lauvergeon. Vincent Crouzet was also questioned for seven hours by the Paris financial brigade, as a witness. He is "firmly convinced that this affair was set up to distribute considerable sums of money to high-level personalities, both African and French". According to him, Uramin was used to "pay commissions linked to the development of EPR programs around the world, and particularly in South Africa".

On November 2, 2014, the Republic of Central Africa referred to the PNF a request for a judicial investigation into Patrick Balkany, suspected of having been one of the beneficiaries of the payment of kickbacks in the Uramin affair.

In December 2014, the newspaper Mediapart revealed that, before the purchase of Uramin, several Areva employees had tried in vain to alert government departments.

=== 2015: corruption investigation against Patrick Balkany ===
At the end of 2014, the Central African Republic complained with the French National Financial Prosecutor's Office (PNF). According to the complaint, Patrick Balkany was involved in alleged embezzlement during the purchase of Uramin in 2007. In 2015, the Paris financial prosecutor's office opened an investigation into Patrick Balkany for bribery of a foreign public official.

The UMP deputy mayor of Levallois is suspected of having acted as an intermediary in settling a dispute between Areva and the previous Central African government.

According to Saifee Durbar, a Pakistani businessman and advisor to Central African President François Bozizé, Balkany was working alongside George Forrest as early as 2007 to represent Areva's interests in the Central African Republic. Patrick Balkany is said to have received $8 million, paid into an account in Singapore, which he denies.

On May 28, 2015, the French justice system, relying on the 2014 preliminary report by the Cour des Comptes, announced the opening of two judicial inquiries against X. The first, which concerns the conditions and circumstances of the Uramin purchase, is open for "fraud, misuse of corporate assets, corruption of a foreign public official". The second was opened for "dissemination of false information to the markets, presentation of inaccurate accounts, abuse of power, forgery and use of forgeries".

=== 2016: new revelations of corruption ===
On February 16, 2016, South Africa's Tokyo Sexwale was accused of taking around $200 million in bribes on the sidelines of Areva's 2007 takeover of mining company Uramin, to open up the South African market for the construction of several EPR reactors.

On March 30, 2016, Olivier Fric was indicted for "insider trading" and "money laundering" in the Uramin affair. The affair was revealed in August 2015 by journalists Hervé Gattegno and Philippe Vasset of Vanity Fair magazine, whose main source is Mario Bréro, the head of Swiss investigative firm Alp Services, a specialist in the Uramin affair.

In May 2016, Anne Lauvergeon was indicted as part of the investigation into the acquisition of UraMin for "presenting and publishing inaccurate accounts and disseminating false information". She has been placed under assisted witness status.

On May 4, 2016, Vincent Crouzet revealed that businessman Stephen Dattels, who sold UraMin to Areva, is one of the biggest donors to US presidential candidate Hillary Clinton's Clinton Foundation.

On October 12, Reuters revealed, from a judicial source, that "Areva's former CFO, Alain-Pierre Raynaud, has been indicted in the investigation into the valuation of the mining company Uramin." The charges relate to "the presentation and publication of inaccurate accounts and the dissemination of false information."

At the end of 2016, the US justice system asked the FBI to investigate Areva's takeover of Uramin.

== 2017–2018: legal proceedings ==
The Uramin affair is at the heart of two judicial inquiries: one into accounting, the other into fraud.

=== Inaccurate accounting ===
Anne Lauvergeon, President of the Areva Group (now Orano) from 2001 to 2011, and two other former executives were under investigation in an accounting case. They were suspected by the National Financial Prosecutor's Office (PNF) of having concealed in their accounts the loss in value of the Uramin company following its takeover by Areva in 2007. Indeed, Areva's 2010 balance sheet showed only 426 million euros in provisions for Uramin's assets, whereas a few months later, at the end of June 2011 after Anne Lauvergeon's departure, 1.456 billion euros were finally provisioned. This investigation followed that of 2016.

In January 2017, the investigating judges summoned Pascal Colin, Areva's auditor at Deloitte. He was placed under assisted witness status. Then it was the former chairman of Areva's audit committee, René Ricol, who was summoned by judges Renaud Van Ruymbeke, Claire Thépaut and Charlotte Bilger. On November 28, Areva's head office in La Défense was searched in connection with the affair.

On May 5, 2017, the PNF requested the indictment of Anne Lauvergeon, Gérald Arbola, Alain-Pierre Raynaud, Thierry Noircler (former audit director), Sébastien de Montessus and Nicolas Nouveau (former Areva CFO) for obstructing the statutory auditors' mission. In addition, the public prosecutor's office requested that Sébastien de Montessus and Nicolas Nouveau be charged with complicity in the presentation of inaccurate annual accounts and the dissemination of misleading information. When the examining magistrates refused to proceed with these new indictments, the public prosecutor's office applied to the Paris Court of Appeal, which upheld this request in October 2018.

=== Fraud section ===
An investigation has been opened into suspicions of embezzlement. In particular, the investigation concerns two contracts in 2009 and 2010 representing an expenditure of $6.9 million in favor of the Namibian mining group United Africa Group (UAG), and monthly payments of $10,000 in 2008 and 2009 to Hage Geingob, then Namibian Minister of Trade and Industry.

In addition, Olivier Fric, Anne Lauvergeon's husband, is under investigation for insider trading in connection with the Uramin takeover.

Finally, Sébastien de Montessus is also suspected of corruption. He was allegedly paid 750,000 euros for acting as an intermediary in the sale of a yacht.

== Timeline ==
- April 2006: Uramin listed on the London Stock Exchange's High-Risk Market.
- April 2006: Daniel Wouters, a Belgian, is appointed Head of Development and Mining Acquisitions at Areva.
- May 2006: Uramin acquires three new mining permits for $27 million in the Central African Republic.
- October 17, 2006: Anne Lauvergeon did not respond to Uramin's offer to be bought for $471 million.
- October 17, 2006: failure to open the world's second-largest uranium mine, 37% owned by Areva. Ground freezing failed to prevent flooding. Soaring uranium prices.
- December 2006: Uramin listed on the Toronto Stock Exchange.
- March 2007: Luc Oursel, hired in January 2007, joins Areva's management board.
- March 2007: Areva acquires a 5.5% stake in Uramin
- May 2, 2007: Areva signs a memorandum of understanding with Uramin in London to set the timetable for the takeover bid.
- August 1, 2008: Areva agrees to pay the Central African Republic $40 million to secure the Bakouma mining concession.
- 2008: the Chinese electricity company CGNPC, which had demanded 49% of Uramin to buy the reactors at the Taishan power plant to secure their uranium supply despite soaring prices, no longer exercises its option.
- February 2010: Thierry d'Arbonneau, Areva's safety director, recruits Marc Eichinger for a secret investigation into the Uramin takeover bid.
- April 10, 2010: the investigation report concludes that the operation is "highly dubious and potentially fraudulent ".
- March 2011: Fukushima nuclear accident, the price of uranium falls below $50 a pound, compared with $135 in 2007.
- June 16, 2011: the Élysée appointed Luc Oursel to succeed Anne Lauvergeon as head of Areva77. Areva's supervisory board approved the decision five days later.
- 11 October 2011: Gilles Carrez's report to the French National Assembly.
- March 2016: Olivier Fric was indicted for insider trading and money laundering.

== See also ==
- Radioactive waste
- Nuclear power
- List of uranium projects

== Bibliography ==
- Adams, Lestyn; Morrall, Andre (2008). UraMin, a Team Enriched: How to Build a Junior Uranium Mining Company.
- Granvaud, Raphaël (2010-02-15). Areva en Afrique: Une face cachée du nucléaire français. Quimperlé: Agone. ISBN 978-274-890156-6.
- Crouzet, Vincent (2014). Radioactif. Belfond. ISBN 978-271-445651-9.
- Perez, Jean-Louis (2014). Anne Lauvergeon, le pouvoir à tout prix. Fouesnant: Le Seuil. ISBN 978-202-118250-7.
- Crouzet, Vincent (2017). Une affaire atomique. Robert Laffont. ISBN 978-222-119773-8.
- Eichinger, Marc (2020). L'homme qui en savait beaucoup trop - Révélations d'un agent au cœur des secrets d'État. Massot. ISBN 978-238-035260-3.

== Documentaries ==
- Uramin / Areva: industrial fiasco or a vast swindle? archive - Jacques Monin's October 24, 2014 France Inter interview.
- The UraMin scandal archive - Rendez-vous avec X broadcasts of January 10 and 17, 2015 on France Inter
- Areva & Uramin The French nuclear time bomb archive - Webdocumentary produced by ARTE Info and broadcast in May 2015.
- Uramin: AREVA's hidden scandal archive - Affaires sensibles broadcast on Tuesday, February 9, 2016, on France Inter.
