= Lorenzo G. Vidino =

Italian expert on Islamism

- Born: Italy
- Occupations: Academic; writer
- Known for: Research into Islamism, Muslim Brotherhood

Lorenzo G. Vidino is an Italian-American writer on Islamism in Europe and North America, with a special focus on the Muslim Brotherhood. Since June 2015, he has headed the George Washington University Center for Cyber and Homeland Security's Program on Extremism.

Prior to his current role, he held positions at Harvard University's Belfer Center for Science and International Affairs, the U.S. Institute of Peace, the RAND Corporation, and the Center for Security Studies (ETH Zurich). In 2014, Vidino served as an expert for the UK government's official review of the Muslim Brotherhood. From 2016 to 2018, he served as Italy's Coordinator of the National Commission on Jihadist Radicalization, under the governments of Matteo Renzi and Paolo Gentiloni.

Vidino has written two books about the Muslim Brotherhood in the West, The New Muslim Brotherhood in the West (2010) and The Closed Circle: Joining and Leaving the Muslim Brotherhood in the West (2020), both published by Columbia University Press.

The 2023 Abu Dhabi Secrets investigation revealed that Vidino worked for the private UAE linked intelligence company Alp Services.

== Career ==
From 2003 to 2008, Vidino was a contributor to the Investigative Project on Terrorism, a nonprofit research group founded by Steven Emerson in 1995 that has been the subject of controversy over its depictions of Muslim organizations.

From 2009 to 2010, he was a fellow at Harvard University's Belfer Center and Jennings Randolph Peace Scholar at the US Institute of Peace. In 2010–11, he was a visiting fellow at the RAND Corporation in Washington, DC, before joining ETH Zurich.

In 2014, he was a policy adviser at the European Foundation for Democracy. Since June 2015, Vidino has headed the George Washington University Center for Cyber and Homeland Security's Program on Extremism.

In 2016–17, Vidino coordinated Italy's National Commission on Jihadist Radicalization, appointed by then-prime minister Matteo Renzi.

IRW acknowledged the authenticity and problematic nature of the posts, issued a formal apology, and removed the trustee. The following month, they announced that their entire board of trustees would resign and be replaced. An independent UK commission headed by former attorney general Dominic Grieve concluded in 2021 that new policies and the existing code of conduct should prevent similar problems from recurring. Meanwhile, based on a review of the evidence, the governments of Germany and the Netherlands stopped funding IRW, and the US issued a public condemnation of the organization's antisemitic remarks.

As of 2021, Vidino served as advisor to the Austrian Documentation Center for Political Islam.

=== Writing ===
Vidino has written four books, a number of congressional testimonies, and numerous articles in several prominent newspapers and academic journals. His main subject is the Muslim Brotherhood, which he describes as "a modern day Trojan horse engaged in a sort of stealth subversion aimed at weakening Western society from within." His books include Al Qaeda in Europe: The New Battleground of International Jihad (2005), The New Muslim Brotherhood in the West (2010), and The Closed Circle: Joining and Leaving the Muslim Brotherhood in the West (2020). The Closed Circle was translated into French, Arabic, Spanish, and Italian.

Vidino has contributed commentary to The Washington Post and The Times. He has been cited in reporting by The Wall Street Journal on security policy.

== UAE links ==
In 2017, Vidino met with Emirati Foreign Minister Abdullah Bin Zayed to discuss his work on the Muslim Brotherhood. Vidino has worked for several organizations financed by the Emirates and the website European Eye on Radicalization, which is funded by a former Emirati intelligence officer.

In 2019, former employee Hassan Hassan accused Vidino of attempting to prevent him from publishing an article about the murder of Jamal Khashoggi in The Atlantic.

An investigative article appeared in The New Yorker in March 2023 about Vidino's connections to the private intelligence agency Alp Services, which had previously been contracted by the United Arab Emirates. According to the article, he was invited to Geneva in January 2018 for a "thousand-dollar dinner" in order to recruit him as a consultant for the agency. Two weeks later, Vidino signed a contract worth 3,000 euros with Mario Brero in exchange for information about the Muslim Brotherhood in Europe. The next month, Vidino wrote that "many of the names on the list come indeed straight from various meetings with German intel." In total, as of April 2020, Vidino had billed 13,000 euros for his work. In contrast, Vidino claims not to know how much money he received and says he does not know the Alp Services employees with whom he communicated. However, after NRC confronted him with photos showing him together with these employees, Vidino broke off contact. He is described by NRC Handelsblad as a non-independent scientist.

The French newspaper Mediapart has also written about the connections between Vidino and the UAE. It has mentioned that Vidino appears as an expert on the website of the Emirati think tank Trends Research. Vidino also sits on the Abu Dhabi-based think tank Hedayah, which is mainly chaired by representatives of the ruling family.

Der Spiegel published an investigation in July 2023, stating that Alp Services benefited from the fact that Vidino was able to establish contacts with quality media. Information was subsequently forwarded to the UAE intelligence services. These lists included Nawaf Salam, German local politicians, and members of the Central Council of Muslims in Germany. Internal Alp Services documents also include correspondence with Christoph de Vries, a member of the German Bundestag. In response to a question from Der Spiegel, de Vries explained that he had been deceived about the true identity of Alp Services.

Under the leadership of the EIC, media outlets from 13 countries have now published research on Vidino on this subject, under the name "Abu Dhabi Secrets". These include Radio Télévision Suisse, Le Soir, and NRC Handelsblad.

Cynthia Millier-Idriss (professor of sociology at American University), distanced from Vidino. Beatrice de Graaf, a professor at Utrecht University, followed in July 2023.

== Reception ==
Vidino's work has received a mix of acclaim and criticism. John Jenkins, who in 2014 led the UK government review of the Muslim Brotherhood, said that "Lorenzo Vidino is a distinguished scholar of the Muslim Brotherhood. In The Closed Circle, he provides the invaluable service of letting those who have left the movement speak for themselves. What they say should enlighten and alarm anyone who thinks the Brotherhood is moderate, a firewall against extremism, or genuinely committed to democratic pluralism. Policy makers need to read it—and then read it again."

American journalist Graeme Wood said that "Vidino's interviews reveal a patient organization that markets itself as moderate but sometimes acts like a sinister and dangerous cult. The Brotherhood requires subtle analysis, and Vidino provides just that—neither overstating its threat nor accepting its claims to be a benign fraternal order. An essential contribution to our understanding of Islamism in the West."

Salafism expert Shiraz Maher stated: "This book is the first of its kind. Well-conceived and highly original, the Closed Circle provides a new analytical framework for thinking about and conceptualizing the reasons for why people have chosen to leave the Muslim Brotherhood."

One review of his 2020 book, The Closed Circle: Joining and Leaving the Muslim Brotherhood in the West, which features interviews with six former Brotherhood members in Western countries, noted the "misplaced" suspicion Vidino puts on the Brotherhood and contested his claim that the Brotherhood seeks the gradual creation of a caliphate.

In April 2020, the Bridge Initiative of Georgetown University published a comprehensive fact sheet about Vidino, claiming that his "research promotes conspiracy theories about the Muslim Brotherhood in Europe and the United States". His ties to the United Arab Emirates have been criticized, along with his quoting of right-wing figures, including Udo Ulfkotte.

In response to criticism, Vidino stated in a September 2022 interview with Wiener Zeitung: "If my work is flawed and has caused you damage, why don't you sue me? It's just general criticism, personal attacks and empty legal threats; that's quite revealing to me." Anas Schakfeh, former president of the Islamic Religious Community in Austria, commented that "U.S. residents can hardly be sued in Austria". Muslim Youth Austria (MJÖ) refrained from filing a lawsuit. MJÖ cited a decision of the Higher Regional Court of Graz, in which it is stated that the "assessment in the Scholz/Heinisch expert opinion, which is based, among other things, on the Vidino study and afterthoughts, is inadequate as evidence". This culminated in Williams College professor Farid Hafez suing Vindino. Hafez v. Vidino was dismissed by the U.S. District Court after the court granted the defendants’ motions to dismiss.

According to Thijl Sunier, professor at the Free University of Amsterdam, although Vidino claims to be an independent scholar, leaked documents show that he was paid by a private intelligence service to substantiate allegations against the Brotherhood. and associated with conspiracy theories about the Brotherhood. University of Toronto professor Amira Mittermaier claims Vidino is a proponent of the Great Replacement conspiracy theory. She criticizes Vidino's argument that the Brotherhood promotes a victim narrative as a striking example of "rhetorical gymnastics".

== Publications ==
- Al Qaeda in Europe: The New Battleground of International Jihad (Rowman & Littlefield, 2005)
- The New Muslim Brotherhood in the West (2010)
- The Muslim Brotherhood in Austria (report, 2017)
- The Closed Circle: Joining and Leaving the Muslim Brotherhood in the West (2020)
