= Marongiu =

Marongiu is a surname. Notable people with the surname include:

- Jean-Pierre Marongiu (1957–2023), French businessman, engineer, and writer
- Lavinia Marongiu (born 1998), Italian artistic gymnast
- Marcel Marongiu (born 1962), French-Swedish fashion designer
