= Avisa =

Avisa may refer to:

- Arbeider-Avisa, a daily newspaper published in Trondheim, Norway, from 1924 to 1996
- Avisa Nordland, newspaper published in Bodø, Norway
- Avisa Partners, a French firm involved in lobbying, cybersecurity and copyright, competitive intelligence and online influence.
- Avisa Relation oder Zeitung one of the first news-periodicals in the world, published in Augsburg, Germany in 1609
- Levanger-Avisa, regional newspaper in Norway
- Steinkjer-Avisa, weekly, local newspaper published in Steinkjer, Norway
- Trønder-Avisa, regional newspaper in Norway
