= Ian Cockerill =

British businessman

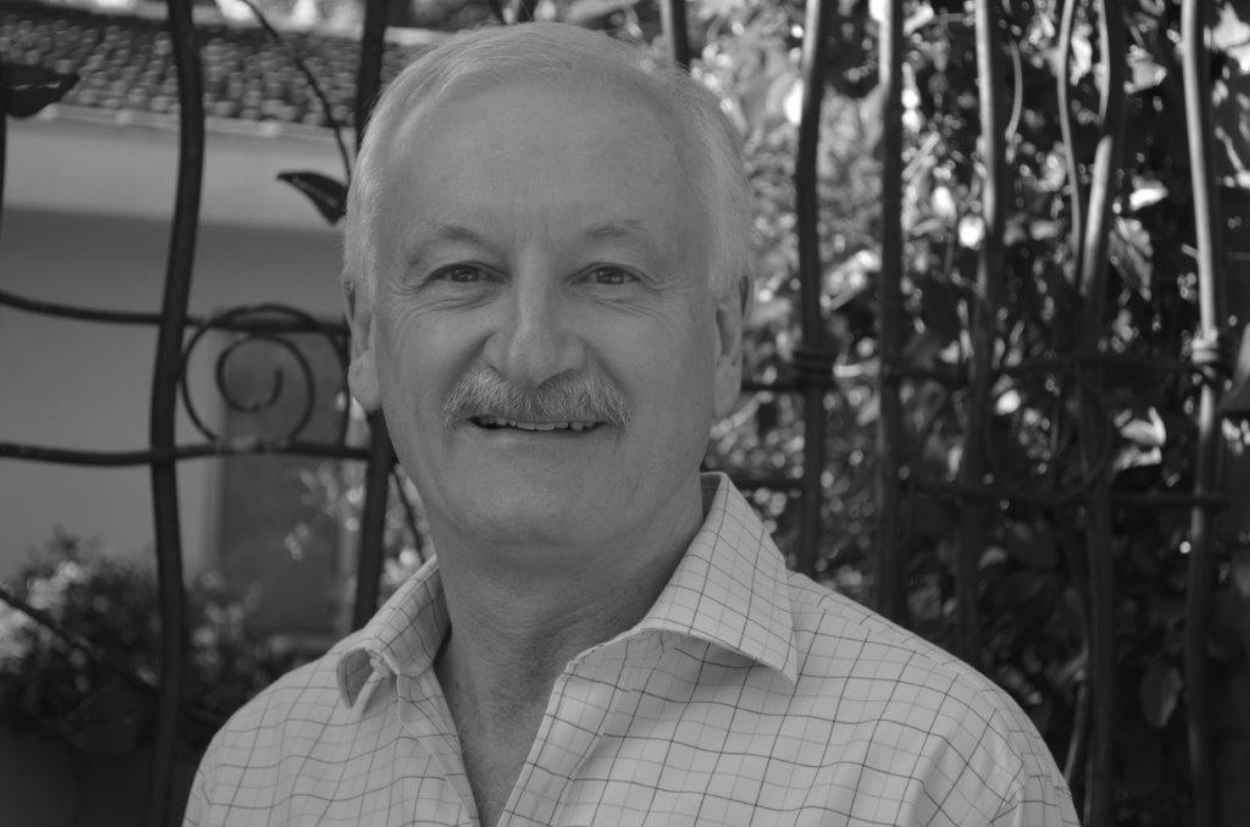
- Cockerill in 2015
- Born: 4 August 1954 (age 72); Cheshire, England
- Citizenship: British (permanent South African Residency)
- Education: Chelsea College of Science and Technology; Royal School of Mines; Templeton College, Oxford
- Occupations: CEO, Endeavour Mining
- Known for: Mining and global resources
- Title: CEO, Endeavour Mining
- Spouse: Iona Beverley Heinemann (m. 1978)
- Children: 3

Ian David Cockerill (born 4 August 1954 in Cheshire, England) is a geologist and mining executive. Cockerill started his mining career in South Africa in 1975 after completing his Bachelor of Science in geology at Chelsea College of Science and Technology. He later completed his Master of Science in Mining-Mineral Production Management at the Royal School of Mines, a Management Development Programme at the University of South Africa, and an Advanced Management Programme at Templeton College, Oxford. Since 2024, he is the chief executive of Endeavour Mining.

== Career ==
In 1975, Cockerill began work in Welkom South Africa at the Union Corporation. His career with the Anglo American plc Group began in 1979 when he joined De Beers as technical assistant at Kleinzee diamond operations in Port Nolloth. After a period in the United Kingdom at Minorco's Technical Director's Office, Cockerill returned to South Africa on transfer to the gold division of Anglo American Corporation, later AngloGold Ltd, as Manager of Elandsrand and Western Deep Levels West Mine (1992 to 1996). Between 1996 and 1999, Cockerill was executive director (Business Development) and Executive Officer (African International Operations) of AngloGold Limited. In 1999, Cockerill became managing director and Chief Operating Officer of Gold Fields Limited, and in 2002 he was appointed as president and chief executive officer of Gold Fields Ltd. In June 2008, Cockerill rejoined Anglo American plc as chief executive officer (Anglo Coal), responsible for all global operations until retiring from that position in 2009. Cockerill was Executive Chairman (2009 to 2015) and Chairman (2015 to 2017) of Petmin Limited, South Africa's leading producer of metallurgical anthracite.

From 2019 until the Russian invasion of Ukraine in 2022, Cockerill was the chair of Polymetal International. He then joined Cornish Lithium as the non-executive chair, leaving the position in 2024. He also left the board of BHP in March 2024. In 2024, Cockerill, who was the deputy chair of Endeavour Mining, replaced Sébastien de Montessus as CEO after Montessus was ousted following allegations of financial misconduct.

== Controversies and awards ==
In October 2004, while Cockerill was CEO, rival mining company Harmony Gold Mining Company launched an aggressive hostile takeover bid for Goldfields Ltd. Cockerill led a spirited defence against the takeover bid, indicating that the proposed transaction would result in labour retrenchments and a substantial lessening of competition in the South African and global gold mining industry. Harmony Gold's hostile bid was defeated in May 2005. The hostile takeover bid, and Cockerill's role in defending Goldfields from the takeover, became the subject of the controversial non-fiction text "Battlefields of Gold:How Gold Fields Fought for Survival and Won" by Rex Gibson (Jonathan Ball Publishers, 2012)

In October 2009, Cockerill was forced out of his position as CEO of Anglo Coal in a management cull carried out by Anglo CEO Cynthia Carroll. Carroll had handpicked him for the job in April 2008, when he moved from his previous position as CEO of Gold Fields. Speculation in the global financial and mining press was that Cockerill was axed because he was a threat to Carroll's position.

In November 2007, Cockerill was named South Africa's 2007 Leading Manager.

== Conservation ==
As founding chairman of the non-profit organisation Leadership for Conservation in Africa (2006 to 2016), Cockerill was engaged in promoting conservation and sustainable development across the African continent in partnership with the South African National Parks Board, global business leaders and the International Union for the Conservation of Nature.

== South African Mining Hall of Fame ==
On 3 October 2017 Cockerill was inducted into the South African Mining Hall of Fame at the 2017 Mining Indaba in Johannesburg, South Africa.
