= Fada N'gourma shooting =

Fada N’Gourma shooting may refer to:

- 2019 Fada N’Gourma attack
- 2020 Fada N’Gourma shooting
