= 2019 Fada N'Gourma attack =

Terrorist incident in Burkina Faso

2019 Fada N’Gourma attack
- Part of the Islamist insurgency in Burkina Faso
- Attack site (Burkina Faso)
- Location: Fada N’Gourma Department, Gourma Province, Burkina Faso
- Date: 6 November 2019
- Attack type: Landmine, mass shooting
- Deaths: 39+
- Injuries: 60
- Perpetrator: Islamic State in the Greater Sahara (suspected)

On 6 November 2019, gunmen ambushed a convoy transporting workers of the Canadian mining firm Semafo near the city of Fada N’Gourma, on a road to the firm's Boungou mine. At least 39 people were killed, and dozens more are missing or injured.

== Background ==
Burkina Faso faced an uprising in 2014 leading to the downfall of President Blaise Compaoré later that year. Burkina Faso is a member of the Trans-Saharan Counterterrorism Partnership and its commitment of peacekeeping troops in Mali and Sudan has made it a target for extremists in the region. Until 2015, Burkina Faso had remained violence free despite violent events occurring in the northern neighbouring countries of Mali and Niger. Since then, jihadist groups linked to Al-Qaeda and the Islamic State began their infiltration into the country from the northern borders followed by its eastern borders. The infiltration have also brought danger to the southern and western borders. Since 2015, Burkina Faso has faced cross-border attacks and sporadic raids in its territory, the result of instability and unrest in neighboring countries.

In the year 2019, ethnic and religious tensions increased as a result of the Islamist insurgency in Burkina Faso. The effect is more prominent in the northern areas of Burkina Faso bordering Mali, with attackers often crossing the border between the countries. According to the UN Refugee agency, in the last three months preceding October, more than a quarter of a million people have been forced to flee their homes in Burkina Faso.

The gold mine in Boungou has come under attack before. Eleven people were killed in two separate ambushes in 2018. The first ambush, in August 2018, killed six people, including five gendarmes. After the attack, Semafo increased security at the Boungou mine. In December 2018, five people including four gendarmes were killed when the lead vehicle of a convoy returning from an escort mission hit a landmine.

== Attack ==
The attack happened in the morning. The target of the attack was a convoy of five buses carrying gold mine workers heading to the Semafo gold mine in Boungou. The convoy was being escorted by military vehicles. The attack started when a military vehicle escorting the convoy hit a landmine. Shortly afterwards, gunmen approached the convoy and opened fire, targeting two buses carrying workers as well as the military escort vehicles. At least 39 people were killed in the attack, not including any security forces who may have been killed while battling the attackers. A large number of people remained unaccounted for after the attack, with some survivors suggesting a death toll of over 100. One survivor said that he was one of only 3 survivors from a bus that initially carried over 80 people. Of the dead, 19 were workers for the Australian mining company Perenti Global, with of its workers hospitalized.

== Aftermath ==
Semafo initially stated that the Boungou mine remained secured, and operations continued as usual. The company also confirmed that it was working with authorities to ensure the security of its employees and contractors. After the attack, the company's stock on the Toronto Stock Exchange fell 11 percent, to $3.49. Shortly afterwards, Semafo suspended its operations in the Boungou mine.
