= Srinivasan Venkatakrishnan =

- Born: 22 May 1966 (age 59); India
- Education: Institute of Chartered Accountants of India University of Madras
- Occupation: Businessman
- Years active: 1996-
- Title: Chairman, Endeavour Mining
- Board member of: AngloGold Ashanti; BlackRock World Mining Trust

Srinivasan Venkatakrishnan is an Indian-born UK mining and restructuring executive. He is the chairman of Endeavour Mining. He joined Weir Group in January 2021, and BlackRock World Mining Trust in August 2021 both as a non-executive director.

He previously was CEO of Vedanta Resources plc between 2018 and 2020 and was CEO of AngloGold Ashanti Limited between 2013 and 2018, having previously been chief financial officer of the business from 2005, and of Ashanti Goldfields Corporation from 2000.

He is a chartered accountant and commerce graduate from the University of Madras, India.
