= Uber Files =

2022 document leak scandal

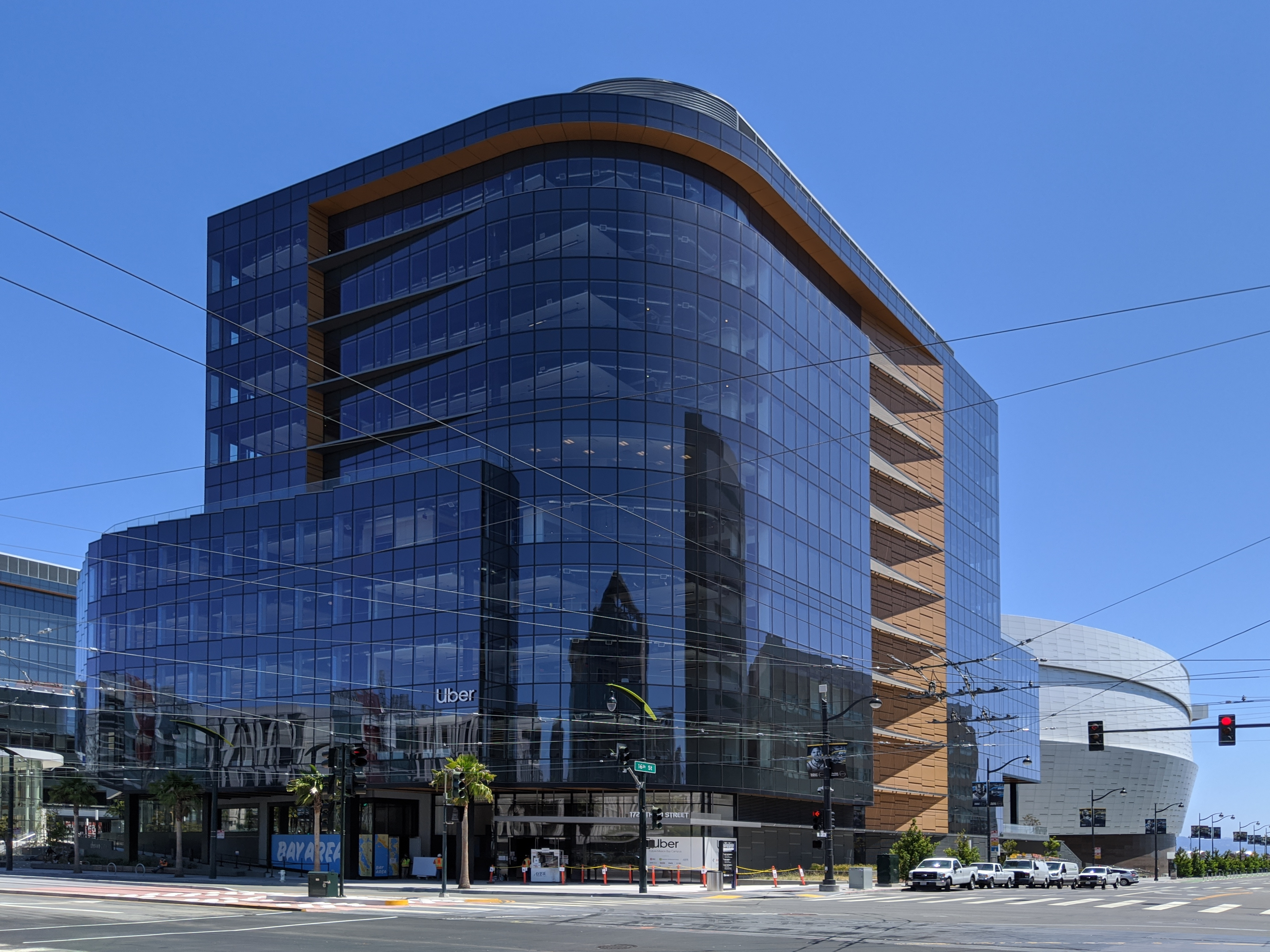
Head office of Uber, San Francisco

The Uber Files are a leaked database of Uber's activities in about 40 countries from 2013 to 2017 leaked by former senior executive Mark MacGann, who admits being "partly responsible", and published by The Guardian on 10 July 2022, which shared the database of more than 124,000 files with the International Consortium of Investigative Journalists (ICIJ) and 42 other media outlets. They included e-mails, iMessage and WhatsApp messages sent between its senior leadership, as well as memos, presentations and other internal documents. The documents revealed attempts to lobby powerful figures including George Osborne, former Chancellor of the Exchequer, German chancellor Olaf Scholz during his mayorship in Hamburg, Germany, and U.S president Joe Biden during his vice presidency, along with Emmanuel Macron secretly aiding Uber lobbying in France during his cabinet membership on the French government. The files also document the use of tools such as "greyball", used to mislead local police, and a kill switch deployed during police raids to conceal data. Former Uber CEO Travis Kalanick dismissed concerns from other executives that sending Uber drivers to a protest in France put them at risk of violence from angry opponents in the taxi industry, saying "I think it's worth it, violence guarantees success".

== Contents ==
=== Lobbying ===
Uber executives met with multiple heads of state, often bypassing the mayors and transport authorities who were supposed to regulate them. These included French president Emmanuel Macron, U.S president Joe Biden, Irish prime minister Enda Kenny, Israeli prime minister Benjamin Netanyahu, UK prime minister Boris Johnson and former UK chancellor George Osborne.

Texts between Macron and Uber co-founder Travis Kalanick suggest that Macron might have secretly helped Uber expand in France when he was economy minister, with Macron even telling the company that he had brokered a secret deal with its opponents in the French cabinet. When the French police banned one of Uber's services in Marseille, Macron was reported to have told Mark MacGann, Uber's chief lobbyist in Europe, that he would look into the issue personally. The ban was revoked two days later.

George Osborne, then UK chancellor, was described as "a strong advocate" who "liked to believe that he's responsible for the positive TfL consultation outcome" (Transport for London's decision to drop plans to tighten regulation).

Neelie Kroes, former EU digital chief, was accused of secretly helping Uber by lobbying Dutch politicians, including prime minister Mark Rutte, during her 18-month "cooling-off period" after leaving the European Commission. While she denied any wrongdoing, an Uber lobbyist told colleagues that her relationship was "highly confidential and should not be discussed outside this group”. Another message said that "her name should never figure on a document whether internal or external". At the same time, her request to formally work for Uber was denied by European Commission president Jean-Claude Juncker.

Uber executives also criticised leaders who pushed back against their lobbyists, calling Olaf Scholz (then mayor of Hamburg) "a real comedian" for insisting on drivers getting a minimum wage. Manuel Valls, former prime minister of France, was privately referred to as "enemy #1" and as a "strong-minded" opponent. Kalanick also criticised Joe Biden, then vice-president of the US, for being late for a meeting.

The leaked documents showed that Uber launched a charm offensive targeting leading media barons in Europe and India in order to secure more favorable treatment from their governments. It targeted the owners of publications such as the UK's Daily Mail, France's Les Echos, Italy's La Repubblica and L'Espresso, Germany's Die Welt and Bild, and The Times of India.

According to Le Monde, Uber hired Avisa Partners, known at the time as iStrat, to manipulate public debate in favour of Uber. The leaked documents show that iStrat published 19 fake articles on 13 websites, including Challenges, Les Echos, Le Journal du Net and Mediapart, during November and December 2014, while a legal case concerning UberPop was being considered by the Tribunal de commerce de Paris.

=== Kill switch ===
When Uber offices were raided by police or regulatory agencies, a "kill switch" was used to cut access to the data systems. This technique was used in France, the Netherlands, Belgium, India, Hungary and Romania. E-mails from Kalanick and Europe legal director Zac de Kievit asking IT staff to kill access to computers were reported by The Guardian. For example, it was reported that when the French competition regulator, the DGCCRF, raided Uber's offices in Paris, de Kievit asked an engineer in Denmark to "please kill access now". Similar procedures were used in Brussels and Amsterdam to prevent police accessing evidence. In the Netherlands, de Kievit was taken into custody and fined EUR750 for "non-compliance with an official order".

The company claims the kill switches were not intended to obstruct justice, but rather to protect IP, customer privacy, and due process. It further claimed no data was permanently deleted, and was available for authorities to obtain later.

=== Greyball ===
Through the use of a tool named Greyball, Uber was capable of targeting selected individuals, for example local police, with a fake version of the app that displayed fake cars that would never arrive if contacted. This was developed with the intention of evading the law where the company's practices had been deemed illegal. Greyball was deployed in countries including Belgium, the Netherlands, Germany, Spain and Denmark, with the knowledge of senior management such as Kalanick and Pierre-Dimitri Gore-Coty. Uber said that it stopped using the app in 2017.

=== Taxation ===
London-based executive Fraser Robinson was asked to move to Amsterdam to persuade UK tax collectors that the company was not partly managed in the UK. (Under UK law, being partly managed in the UK, for example by having senior executives in London, would make a company taxable in the UK.) He refused to move, possibly for family reasons, and stepped down.

=== Passenger safety ===
On 5 December 2014, a passenger was assaulted in an Uber cab by its driver in New Delhi. Following this, Uber was temporarily withdrawn and then forced to manage operations through an Indian subsidiary. Uber also ran into disputes with the Reserve Bank of India, the Income Tax department and consumer courts. Following this, a 'kill switch' was used to prevent Indian authorities accessing evidence. Uber Manager Rob van der Woude described the system in an e-mail - "what we did in India is have the city team be as cooperative as possible and have [Uber] BV take the heat. E.g. Whenever the local team was called to provide the information, we shut them down from the system making it practically impossible for them to give out any info despite their willingness to do so. At the same time we kept directing the authorities to talk to [Uber] BV representatives instead." In another mail, Allen Penn, Uber's Asia head, told employees "we will generally stall, be unresponsive, and often say no to what they want. This is how we operate and it’s nearly always the best". The Indian Express also found that in most Uber cabs, safety features mandated by the Delhi Government, such as a panic button, were not present or did not work.

=== Employee safety ===
In one exchange, Kalanick was quoted as saying that sending Uber drivers to a protest in France was "worth it", despite the risk of violence from angry taxi drivers. Warned that "extreme right thugs" had infiltrated the protest and were "spoiling for a fight", he was quoted as saying that "violence guarantee[s] success".

The Washington Post reported that the documents, together with interviews with Uber drivers, showed that Uber knowingly created working conditions that resulted in its drivers barely scraping by, and created a system that rewarded drivers for taking routes and schedules that put them at risk of harm in violence-plagued areas.

== Reactions ==
Jill Hazelbaker, Uber's senior vice-president of public affairs, issued a statement: "We have not and will not make excuses for past behaviour that is clearly not in line with our present values. Instead, we ask the public to judge us by what we've done over the last five years and what we will do in the years to come." Travis Kalanick's spokesperson said that Kalanick "never authorised any actions or programs that would obstruct justice in any country" and that he "never suggested that Uber should take advantage of violence at the expense of driver safety".

When questioned by a journalist from Le Monde about his meetings with Uber officials between 2014 and 2016, Macron said he was "proud" to have supported the company, and that he would "do it again tomorrow and the day after tomorrow". French opposition politicians across the political spectrum, as well as the leader of the trade union CGT, called for a parliamentary inquiry into Macron's links to Uber. Fabien Roussel of the French Communist Party described the revelations as "devastating" and "Against all our rules, all our social laws and against workers' rights."

The European Trade Union Confederation called for the suspension of parliamentary access passes for Uber staff, claiming that Uber was "lobbying hard to try and water down EU legislation on the rights of platform workers".

The Italian news agency Agenzia Nazionale Stampa Associata (ANSA) reported that taxi drivers across Italy stopped their vehicles in protest at the revelations on 12 July.
