= Luc Oursel =

French businessman (1959–2014)

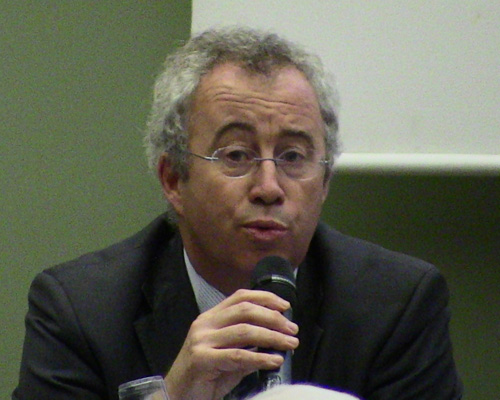
- Luc Oursel in 2011
- Born: 7 September 1959; Boulogne-Billancourt, France
- Died: 3 December 2014 (aged 55); Paris, France
- Education: Mines ParisTech - Corps des mines
- Occupation: CEO of Areva (2011-2014)
- Spouse: Sylvie Delorme
- Children: 4
- Father: Bernard Oursel

Luc Marie Bernard Oursel (7 September 1959 – 3 December 2014) was the former chairman of the board of the nuclear company Areva and member of its executive committee. He resigned on 20 October 2014 for health reasons. Until June 2013, he was the President of the French Nuclear Energy Corporation. In 2010, he was made a Knight Commander of the French Legion of Honour

He died on 3 December 2014.

== Education ==
After having studied at the Lycée Janson de Sailly in Paris, Luc Oursel graduated from the École nationale supérieure des mines de Paris as a mining engineer.

Business positions
| Preceded by Anne Lauvergeon | CEO of Areva; 2011–2014 | Succeeded by Philippe Knoche |
