= European Investigative Collaborations =

- Formation: 2016
- Key people: Stefan Candea (Founding partner)
- Website: eic.network

The European Investigative Collaborations (EIC) network is a European collaborative hybrid project of transnational investigative journalism. EIC was established in the fall of 2015 with founding members, including Der Spiegel, El Mundo, Mediapart, the Romanian Centre for Investigative Journalism (CRJI), and Le Soir, and launched in the winter of 2016. On March 18, 2016, after three months research, they published the results of their first joint investigation spurred on by the 2015 terrorist attacks in Paris, in which they revealed how in spite of security risk warnings, "the EU’s freedom of goods policy facilitated the sale of weapons leading to [the 2015] terror attacks in Paris." In 2017 working with "over 60 journalists in 14 countries", the EIC published the Football Leaks—the "largest leak in sports history".

== Objective ==
Through "joint reporting and publication", the EIA aims to strengthen the European transnational investigative journalism by joint reporting with the utmost transparency. They exchange documents and articles and coordinate publication, and to improve the tools used in their investigations from one investigation to another—for example in their data processing capabilities, servers, secure forums, etc.

== Members ==
- Falter (Austria)
- Mediapart (France)
- El Mundo (Spain)
- Politiken (Denmark)
- Le Soir (Belgium)
- De Standaard (Belgium)
- Der Spiegel (Germany)
- L'Espresso (Italy)
- NRC Handelsblad (Netherlands)
- Dagens Nyheter (Sweden)
- Nacional (Croatia)
- Expresso (Portugal)
- The Black Sea (Romania)

== History ==
At Dataharvest 2015 and other networking events, discussions related to "establishing this European Network" started with "Jörg Schmitt, Jürgen Dahlkamp, Alfred Weinzierl and Klaus Brinkbäumer from Der Spiegel and Stefan Candea from the Romanian Centre for Investigative Journalism (CRJI). Stefan Candea, a founding partner explained how following the terrorist attacks, such as the November 2015 Paris attacks, journalists "started to bounce ideas off each other." This led to their first collaborative transnational investigation resulting in the series Mapping the Weapons of Terror. Others joined the group, including, "Alain Lallemand from Le Soir, John Hansen from Politiken, Milorad Ivanovic from Newsweek Serbia, Florian Klenk from Falter, Paula Guisado from El Mundo, Vlad Odobescu from The Romanian Centre for Investigative Journalism, Michael Bird from The Black Sea, Fabrice Arfi from Mediapart and Vittorio Malagutti from L'Espresso. By 2017, NRC Handelsblad in the Netherlands had joined along with dozens of European media and over forty investigative journalists.

=== The Black Sea ===
The Black Sea, led by "award winning journalists and photo-journalists from the Romanian Centre for Investigative Journalism (CRJI)", is "a web project bringing together journalists, photographers and videographers.

== Investigations ==
=== Mapping the Weapons of Terror (March 2016) ===
That story came about after a meeting at the end of last year. The essentials concerning the network had been agreed on, so then we started bouncing ideas off each other. How easily are guns available for big terrorist attacks like the ones in Paris that at that time had just happened? And then we took it from there.

— Stefan Candea, EIC founding partner 2017

After three months of research On March 18, 2016, EIC journalists published "Mapping the Weapons of Terror" in which they revealed how a "shadow gun market" in East Europe fuelled "terrorism in the west, as criminal gangs use legal loopholes and open borders to traffic weapons." They revealed how in spite of security risk warnings, "the EU’s freedom of goods policy facilitated the sale of weapons leading to [the 2015] terror attacks in Paris."

=== Football Leaks (2016/2017) ===
The EIC working with "over 60 journalists in 14 countries" published a "series of articles called Football Leaks—the "largest leak in sports history". Football Leaks "led to the prosecution of football superstar Cristiano Ronaldo and coach Jose Mourinho."

=== Malta Files (2017) ===
In May 2017, European Investigative Collaborations published Malta Files, an investigation into "how the Mediterranean state works as a pirate base for tax avoidance inside the EU. Although profiting from the advantages of EU membership, Malta also welcomes large companies and wealthy private clients who try to dodge taxes in their home countries."

Among those included in the reports are Italian mafia figures, Russian billionaires and the families of both Turkey's president and prime minister.

=== Tax Evader Radar ===
In 2020, Distributed Denial of Secrets (DDoSecrets) published a copy of the Bahamas corporate registry. DDoSecrets partnered with European Investigative Collaborations and the German Henri-Nannen-Schule journalism school to create the Tax Evader Radar, a project to review the dataset of almost one million documents. The project exposed the offshore holdings of prominent Germans, the tax activities of ExxonMobil, as well as offshore business entities belonging to the DeVos and Prince families.

=== Abu Dhabi Secrets ===
In July 2023, Abu Dhabi Secrets were published how UAE Abu has sought to discredit its rival Qatar, which was picked up by numerous media. In Germany Der Spiegel wrote that German president Frank-Walter Steinmeier, whose photo had been on the Islamic Relief Deutschland website as a prominent backer withdrew his support after Mario Breros intelligence firm Alp Services insinuated links from Qatar with Islamism and terrorism.

== See also ==
- Football Leaks
- International Consortium of Investigative Journalists
