= Anne Lauvergeon =

French businesswoman (born 1959)

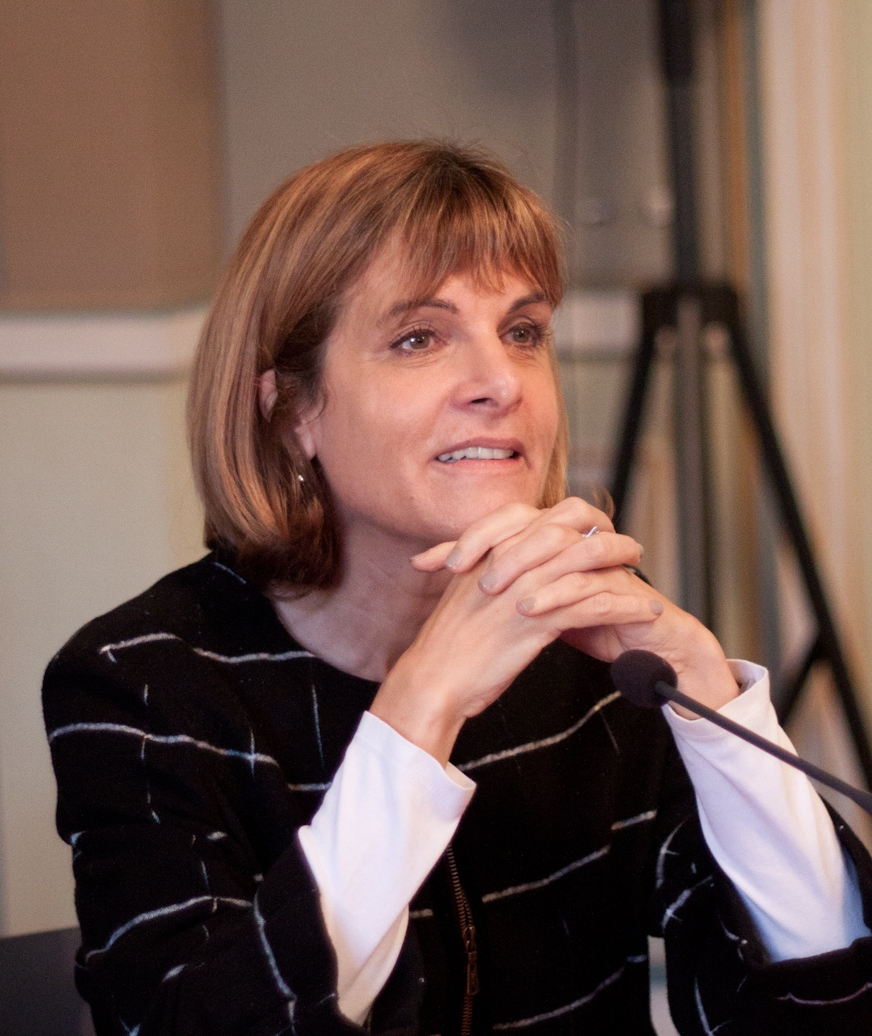
- Lauvergeon in 2012
- Born: 2 August 1959 (age 67); Dijon, France
- Education: Lycée Lakanal; Lycée Voltaire
- Alma mater: École normale supérieure Mines ParisTech
- Spouse: Olivier Fric

Anne Lauvergeon (born 2 August 1959) is a French businesswoman who was CEO of Areva from 2001 to 2011. According to The Wall Street Journal, she is known internationally as one of the most prominent defenders of nuclear power.

== Early life and education ==
Lauvergeon was born into a middle-class family in Dijon, Côte-d'Or; her father taught history and her mother was a social worker. Her grandfather was mayor of a village in Burgundy. She later grew up in Orléans, where her father became a professor of geography.

Lauvergeon attended the École normale de jeunes filles to pass the Agrégation in physics. Then she entered the Corps des Mines. In 1983 she enrolled in her first vocational course with the Corps de Mines, in the iron and steel industry, at Usinor. A second vocational course, in 1984, took place with the Commissariat à l'énergie atomique, where she studied chemical safety in Europe.

== Career ==
=== Early beginnings ===
From 1985 to 1988, Lauvergeon was with the l'Inspection générale des carrières (IGC). In 1990, she was placed in charge of the mission for the international economy and foreign trade by French President François Mitterrand. The following year, she became assistant secretary-general. She was then named "sherpa", i.e. personal representative to the president, and responsible for preparing international meetings such as the G7 summit.

In 1995, Lauvergeon joined the banking sector, and became a managing partner of Lazard; she was the only woman partner at the firm. While at Lazard, she spent several months at the investment bank's New York office. In late 1996, she left the firm after difficulties with Édouard Stern; according to media reports at the time, Stern had particularly taken exception to an invitation that Lauvergeon received to join the board of French aluminium company Pechiney.

In March 1997, Lauvergeon was appointed general director of Alcatel, before becoming part of the group's executive committee. In that capacity, she was responsible for international activities and the company's industrial shareholdings in the energy and nuclear fields.

=== Career at Areva ===
In June 1999 Lauvergeon was appointed CEO of the group Cogema, succeeding Jean Syrota, who resigned under pressure from The Greens. In July 2001, she merged Cogema, Framatome and other companies to create Areva. At the head of the new company, she became a member of the small circle of women directing international corporations; in September 2002, daily economic newspaper Les Échos uncovered a report from the French Court of Auditors, citing Lauvergeon's compensation (salary of €305,000 with a bonus of €122,000) and "golden parachute" of two years' wages.

In 2004, Lauvergeon resisted a request from Nicolas Sarkozy, then finance minister, to help bail out French transport and energy company Alstom. When Alstom's leadership announced plans in 2008 to create a heavy-engineering conglomerate by combining Alstom and Areva in a single entity, Lauvergeon reiterated her opposition.

Under Lauvergeon, Areva instead developed into a one-stop shop for nuclear energy. The company became one of the world's top uranium producers and mining accounted for 12 per cent of its 2010 revenue. On 10 July 2008 in the French economic paper Challenges, she stated: "Uranium is a main part of our success. Our model is... Nespresso: we sell coffee machines and the coffee that fits them. And coffee is very profitable. So in China, we sold two nuclear islands, plus 35% of our uranium production. This is our integrated business model".

Towards the end of 2006, Areva encountered difficulties with its new European Pressurized Reactor and announced an expected delay of eighteen months to three years for its delivery, according to the French daily newspaper La Tribune. The reactor is to be the first of its kind in Finland. The delay may cost €700 million. Following the Fukushima Daiichi nuclear disaster in 2011, she traveled frequently to Japan and spoke out in regular television appearances in support of nuclear power.

In addition to her role at Areva, Lauvergeon was part of other political and business initiatives. In 2001, France's Minister of Science Roger-Gérard Schwartzenberg chose her to chair the "national contest of assistance the creation of companies of innovating technologies". In June 2010 Lauvergeon attended the Bilderberg conference in Sitges, Spain.

By 2011, Lauvergeon came under fire due to cost overruns at the Areva-built Olkiluoto Nuclear Power Plant and the loss of a $40 billion contract in Abu Dhabi to a South Korean consortium. On 16 June 2011 Prime Minister François Fillon announced that her mandate as head of Areva, terminating end of June 2011, would not be renewed. She was replaced by Luc Oursel, member of the Areva board of management since 2007.

Since leaving Areva, Lauvergeon has been a partner and managing director of Efficiency Capital, an investment firm that focuses on energy, technologies, and natural resources. She is also chairman and CEO of A.L.P. SAS, an advisory company. By 2016, media reported that President François Hollande had proposed Lauvergeon to take over as chair of the board at EADS and had won the backing of Chancellor Angela Merkel of Germany for her candidature.

=== Controversies ===
On 16 October 2009 Lauvergeon addressed journalists outside the "Women’s Forum" organised in Deauville. She declared: "To be clear, with same competences, sorry, we will choose the woman or something else rather than the white male." She said these words during the France 2 evening news. This statement generated reaction and was chosen as an example by Éric Zemmour and Marine Le Pen to explain that positive discrimination was a kind of racism.

In 2011, Lauvergeon filed a legal complaint after she discovered a confidential report by private investigators on her husband Olivier Fric's business activities. By 2012, she asked a French court to appoint an expert to examine the circumstances under which Areva ordered a probe in 2010 into the 2007 purchase of Canadian uranium mining firm UraMin; the request was subsequently denied. An internal audit into the deal did not reveal fraud, but said that presentations made to state holding company APE and to Areva's board about the planned UraMin acquisition had not given enough prominence to the doubts that the internal technical teams had expressed.

Areva initially withheld Lauvergeon's 1.5 million euro ($2 million) severance pay due to the UraMin dispute. Also in 2012, a court ordered the company to sign a contract allowing Lauvergeon to receive her severance pay.

Only 11 days before the first round of the 2012 French presidential election, Lauvergeon accused Sarkozy in an interview with French weekly L'Express of having tried to sell an atomic reactor to Libyan leader Muammar Gaddafi until mid-2010. In the interview, Lauvergeon also said Sarkozy had offered her a cabinet seat when he was elected in 2007 but she had refused. Sarkozy's spokeswoman Valérie Pécresse responded by accusing Lauvergeon of trying to "settle scores", calling her statements as "fictitious". At the time, Lauvergeon was tipped as a possible minister in a Socialist government under François Hollande.

In 2016, Lauvergeon was put under formal investigation for her role in the UraMin acquisition, over questions on whether she deliberately submitted misleading annual accounts that concealed huge writedowns on its €1.8 billion investment in UraMin. Also, French judicial authorities investigated Fric for insider trading and money laundering over the UraMin purchase.

== Personal life ==
Lauvergeon is married to business consultant Olivier Fric.

== Other activities ==
=== Corporate boards ===
- IB2, chair of the Board (since 2019)
- Koç Holding, Member of the Board of Directors (since 2016)
- Avril Group, Member of the Board of Directors
- Sigfox, chairman of the Board of Directors (since 2014)
- Suez, Independent Member of the Board of Directors (since 2014)
- American Express, Member of the Board of Directors (2013–2021)
- Rio Tinto, Member of the Board of Directors (2014–2017)
- Airbus, Member of the Board of Directors (2013-2016)
- Total S.A., Member of the Board of Directors (−2015)
- Libération, Member of the Board of Directors (2011–2014)
- Vodafone, Non-Executive Member of the Board of Directors (2005–2014)
- Safran, Member of the Board of Directors (2001–2009)

=== Non-profit organizations ===
- École Nationale Supérieure des Mines de Nancy, President of the Board of Directors
- Trilateral Commission, Member of the European Group
- Global Business Coalition on HIV/AIDS, Member of the Advisory Board
- International Commission on Nuclear Non-proliferation and Disarmament (ICNND), Member of the Advisory Board

== Recognition ==
In French media, Lauvergeon was often cited as one of the world's most powerful women during her time at Areva. The 2006 Fortune Global 500, published by the American magazine Fortune, ranked her as the 2nd most powerful woman in Europe, behind Patricia Russo, future president of Alcatel-Lucent Technologies. Also in 2006 she was ranked by Forbes magazine as the eighth-most powerful woman in the world and was ranked ninth-most powerful women in 2008 and 2009. In 2007, she was named Europe's top businesswoman in the Financial Times annual ranking.

In July 2011 Lauvergeon was elected an International Fellow by the Royal Academy of Engineering in the UK.

== See also ==
- UraMin
- Areva

Business positions
Preceded by None	CEO of Areva; 2001–2011	Succeeded by Luc Oursel
