= Sébastien de Montessus =

Sébastien de Montessus (born 1974) is a French businessman. He was chief executive officer (CEO) of Endeavour Mining from 2016 to 2024, and has been CEO of Mansa Resources since 2025.

== Early life and education ==
Sébastien de Montessus spent part of his childhood in Africa, notably in Niger and South Africa, where his father, Robert de Montessus de Ballore, worked as an engineer at Framatome.

He was educated at Saint-Martin-de-France and later attended preparatory classes at Lycée Janson-de-Sailly in Paris, before graduating from ESCP Business School in 1999. He began his career the same year as an investment banker in mergers and acquisitions at Morgan Stanley in London.

== Business career ==
In 2000, he co-founded Ofye (“Only For Your Eyes”), a company specialising in mobile internet services. In 2002, he joined the French nuclear group Areva, where he held several strategy and operational roles before becoming head of the group’s Mines division in 2007, overseeing uranium exploration and production activities.

In 2012, Sébastien de Montessus became CEO of La Mancha following its acquisition by the Sawiris family in July 2012 for $492 million. The restructuring led to a reorganization of the company's assets, some of which were contributed to listed companies such as Evolution Mining and Endeavour Mining. In 2015, La Mancha partnered with Endeavour Mining and became its largest shareholder, with around 30% of the capital.

In 2016, he was appointed CEO of Endeavour Mining, a gold mining company operating in West Africa. During his tenure, the company developed several gold mines and completed acquisitions including Semafo (2020) and Teranga Gold (2021). In 2021, Endeavour Mining joined the FTSE 100 index of the London Stock Exchange.

In 2025, he became CEO of Mansa Resources, a mining company backed by Burkinabè entrepreneur Idrissa Nassa and Orion Resource Partners, a US investment firm specializing in metals and materials used in the energy transition.
