= Endeavour Mining =

Mining company

Endeavour Mining plc
- Type: Public
- Traded as: TSX: EDV; LSE: EDV; FTSE 100 component
- Industry: Mining
- Founded: 1988; 38 years ago
- Headquarters: London, England, UK
- Number of locations: Three main locations: Burkina Faso, Côte d'Ivoire and Senegal
- Key people: Srinivasan Venkatakrishnan (Chair); Ian Cockerill (CEO); Guy Young (CFO)
- Products: Gold
- Revenue: ▲US$4,233.9 million (2025)
- Operating income: ▲US$1,638.5 million (2025)
- Net income: ▲US$889.1 million (2025)
- Subsidiaries: Semafo, Teranga Gold Corporation, Societe des Mines d'Ity S.A. (Côte d'Ivoire), Houndé Gold Operations SA (Burkina Faso)
- Website: endeavourmining.com

Endeavour Mining plc is a multinational mining company that owns and operates gold mines in Côte d'Ivoire, Burkina Faso and Senegal. The company is headquartered in London, England, and is listed on the London Stock Exchange. It is a constituent of the FTSE 100 Index.

== History ==
The company, established by a team led by Neil Woodyer as Endeavour Financial in 1988, diversified from mining finance to mining operations in the early 21st century.

It acquired Etruscan Resources (including the Agbaou mine in Côte d'Ivoire) in June 2010.

Endeavour announced in June 2017 that it would purchase Avnel Gold Mining Limited for C$159 million. Avnel held an 80% interest in the Kalana Gold project in Mali and exploration permits in the surrounding area.

Woodyer stood down as CEO and was replaced by Sébastien de Montessus in May 2016.

In July 2020, the company acquired Semafo for its Mana and Boungou gold mines in Burkina Faso.

In February 2021, the company acquired Teranga Gold Corporation for its Sabodala-Massawa gold mine in Senegal and its Wahgnion gold mine in Burkina Faso.

The company was subject to an initial public offering on the London Stock Exchange in June 2021.

In January 2024, De Montessus was dismissed from his position as CEO due to allegations of serious misconduct over an irregular payment instruction associated with an asset disposal. Ian Cockerill was appointed CEO.

In September 2024, it was announced that the Boungou and Wahgnion mines in Burkina Faso would be nationalised, with a payment to be made to Endeavour Mining of $60mn in cash.
