= Roland Jacquard =

French journalist and consultant

Roland Jacquard is a Lebanese-born French journalist, essayist and consultant. He is a specialist in terrorism.

== Biography ==
A former freelancer at Le Canard enchaîné, Roland Jacquard chairs the International Observatory of Terrorism, a non-governmental organization of which he is the only member, "without publications, without a website, without a postal address and without any legal existence" writes Le Monde in 2015, as well as the Sentinel newsletter, created in 1986, which offers “awareness and training sessions” on the terrorist issue. A regular guest on the program ‘C dans l'air’, Roland Jacquard is also the author of essays on Osama bin Laden and terrorism. In 2001, he enjoyed major bookstore success with Au nom d'Ossama bin Laden, an essay devoted to the networks of Islamist terrorism. Sales of the book, written before the September 11 attacks but released a few days afterwards, were stimulated by the event, to the point that it was translated into many languages.

== Controversies ==
Some of Roland Jacquard's analyses have been the subject of controversy as to their validity. According to the journalists Didier Bigo, Laurent Bonelli and Thomas Deltombe, the comments made by Roland Jacquard as an expert in the media would be questionable.

In July 2010, Roland Jacquard presented on France 5 in the program ‘C dans l'air’ and presented to the camera a manual in Arabic of 300 pages, supposedly intended for the executives of Al-Qaeda in order to protect themselves from the secret services on the Internet. The authenticity of the document has been called into question by other journalists, as the cover of the document was a simple C++ manual downloadable for free on the Internet.

On 22 July 2011, following the 2011 Norway attacks committed by the Norwegian Neo-Nazi Anders Behring Breivik, Roland Jacquard, who offers a personal analysis, is criticized by the former commissioner of RG Patrick Rougelet: "Roland Jacquard perfectly illustrates the danger of these incestuous relationships” (between RG and journalism).

A series of documents leaked in 2023 alleged that following 2017 Qatar diplomatic crisis, Jacquard became a mediator between the United Arab Emirates and a Swiss-based economic intelligence company, Alp Services. The documents alleged that Jacquard recommended the founder of Alp Services, Mario Brero, to the UAE and that the UAE subsequently hired Brero to execute what The New York Times deemed a "smear campaign" against Emirati opponents, including Qatar and the Muslim Brotherhood. It was also alleged in these documents that Jacquard had provided information on French national security to an Emirati spy. He was additionally accused of taking bribes from the Emirati government in order to facilitate these deals.
