= David D. Kirkpatrick =

American journalist (born 1970)

David D.N. Kirkpatrick
- Born: 1970 (age 55–56); Buffalo, New York, U.S.
- Education: Princeton University (BA)
- Occupation: Journalist

David D. Kirkpatrick (born 1970) is a writer for The New Yorker. From 2000 to 2022, he was a correspondent for The New York Times, based in New York, Washington, Cairo and London. From 2011 through 2015, he served as the newspaper's Cairo bureau chief and a Middle East correspondent. He has received three Pulitzer Prizes as part of various teams at The New York Times.

== Early life and education ==
Kirkpatrick was born in 1970 in Buffalo, New York. He earned a Bachelor of Arts degree in history and American studies at Princeton University, graduating magna cum laude, and attended the graduate program in American studies at Yale University.

== Professional career ==
Kirkpatrick started his career as a fact checker at The New Yorker, where some 23 years later he would return as a staff writer.

In the interim, his reporting career began in the media group at The New York Times in June 2000. During the United States presidential election of 2004, he was assigned to create a "conservative beat" for The New York Times, with a special focus on religious conservatives. The assignment raised eyebrows among some on the right because of the newspaper's liberal reputation and editorials.

In addition to the Washington, National, and Media desks of the Times, he has written for The New York Times Magazine as well as New York magazine. This included a series exposing plagiarism in non-fiction writing.

On December 28, 2013, Kirkpatrick published a detailed account of the 2012 Benghazi attack titled "A Deadly Mix in Benghazi". Based on extensive interviews with Libyan witnesses and American officials, the article concluded that the attack began as neither a spontaneous protest nor an Al Qaeda plot. It was a planned attack carried out by local Islamist militants, and it was inspired in part by an American-made online video ridiculing Islam.

Kirkpatrick was denied entry into Egypt on February 18, 2019, and sent back to London the following day after Egyptian authorities held him for hours at Cairo International Airport.

He was part of a New York Times team that received the 2020 Pulitzer Prize for International Reporting. In 2021 he was part of the team that received the Pulitzer Prize for Public Service. In 2022 he was part of another team at The New York Times that received the Pulitzer Prize for National Reporting.

== Into the Hands of Soldiers ==
Kirkpatrick's book, Into the Hands of the Soldiers: Freedom and Chaos in Egypt and the Middle East, (Bloomsbury Publishing, 2018,) narrates the author's notes on how and why the Arab Spring sparked, then failed, focusing on America's role in that failure and the subsequent military coup that put Sisi in power. The Economist and the Financial Times both named it one of the best books published in 2018.
