= Jean-Pierre Marongiu =

French businessman and writer (1957–2023)

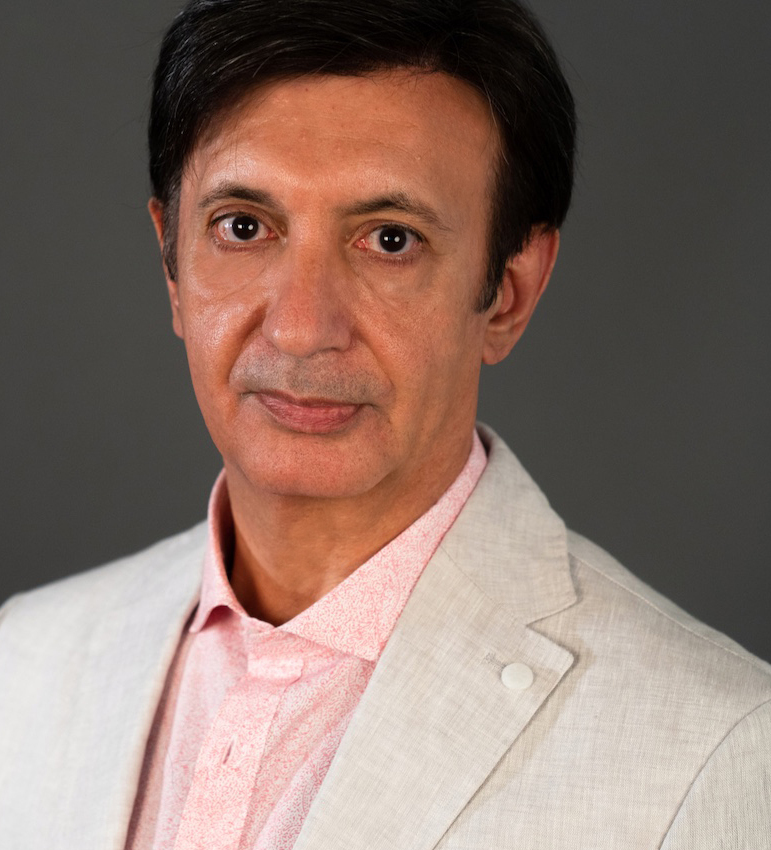
- Marongiu in 2019
- Born: 24 March 1957; Tunisia
- Died: 13 June 2023 (aged 66); Metz, France
- Occupations: Businessman, writer
- Known for: Being imprisoned in Qatar for 5 years

Jean-Pierre Marongiu (24 March 1957 – 13 June 2023) was a French businessman, engineer, and writer. While living in Qatar, he experienced legal challenges and spent five years imprisoned. After returning to France, he wrote about his experiences in Qatar's justice system.

== Early life and career ==
Born on 24 March 1957 in Tunisia, Marongiu worked as an arts and crafts engineer in Aix-en-Provence. He then worked as a quality control manager in Panama for a French company, Ateliers et chantiers de Marseille, later continuing on to Costa Rica. Subsequently, he supervised oil platform construction projects and worked abroad in Asia, Africa, South America, and the North Sea, before settling in Angola in 2001, where he founded a company specializing in the energy and civil engineering sectors.

== Qatar legal challenge ==
In 2005, Marongiu invested in a Qatari management training company alongside a local partner who took 51% of the shares, as required by Qatari law. In 2008, he was elected president of the Union des Français de l'Étranger in Qatar for a five-year term. However, he was trapped by his Qatari partner, who in 2013 demanded all of his shares in the company without compensation.

During an interview at his office in DOHA, with a French TV crew he made a comment about how MODERN SLAVERY is taking place in Qatar! That was enough for him to be sent to prison in Doha.

== Death ==
Jean-Pierre Maroniu died in Metz on 13 June 2023, at the age of 66.

== Publications ==
- Le Châtiment des élites (2011)
- Qaptif (2013)
- Le vent ne change jamais de direction… Ce sont les hommes qui lui tournent le dos (2013)
- InQarcéré (2019)
- Aussi noire que soit ma nuit, je reviendrai vers toi (2020)
- Même à terre, restez debout ! (2020)
- Le hasard n'existe pas, il s'écrit (2022)
