= Avisa Partners =

French lobbying company

- Established: 2010 (16 years ago)
- Founders: Arnaud Dassier
- Legal status: société par actions simplifiée
- Headquarters: Paris
- Country: France
- Parent organisations: Avisa Holdco
- Website: www.avisa-partners.com

Avisa Partners is a French firm involved in lobbying, cybersecurity and copyright, competitive intelligence, and online influence. It was created in 2010 and evolved from predecessors including iStrat and a 2018 merger between Demeter, Lexfo and Avisa.

2022 investigations by Mediapart, Marianne, Fakir, Libération, and Le Monde revealed Avisa Partners' activities in publishing ghostwritten articles and intervening in Wikipedia to promote the interests of its clients and to criticise clients' adversaries, giving rise to accusations of information manipulation.

== Creation and growth ==
Avisa Partners was created in 2010 by Matthieu Creux and Arnaud Dassier under the name iStrat. It was subsequently rebranded to Demeter Partners, and was reorganised as Avisa Partners in 2018 by a merger between Demeter Partners, cybersecurity firm Lexfo and the Belgian public affairs company Avisa Partners.

Around 2019, Avisa Partners bought the German firm International Dialogue Advisors (IDA) Group, the London firm Gabara Strategies Ltd, and opened an office in Washington, D.C. That same year, Raise Investissement and Rive Croissance acquired a stake of 25% in Avisa Partners, at a valuation of €130 million.

In 2020, Avisa purchased Compagnie européenne d'intelligence stratégique. In 2021, Avisa bought Observatoire des pays arabes. In November 2021, Avisa purchased 35°Nord, a group involved in providing advice and information for businesses and politicians in relation to Africa. In 2022, Avisa Partners bought Databack, involved in recovering data lost in cyberattacks, and LeakID, involved in tracing illegal streaming of digital media.

== Leadership and structure ==
Avisa Partners was created in its early format as iStrat by Matthieu Creux and Arnaud Dassier. Olivia Grégoire, a minister of the French government in 2022, was co-leader of iStrat during 2013–2014. Grégoire stated that she had had no responsibility for the content published by iStrat. Libération stated that former iStrat writers disagreed, describing Grégoire as having supervised the creation of articles under fake profiles.

== Activities ==
=== Lobbying ===
For the 2021 calendar year, Avisa Partners declared €1,845,000 in lobbying costs to European Union (EU) institutions, with 21 half-time lobbyists employed. Its most costly EU actions in 2021 were for Monaco, Airbus and LVMH on issues including the European Green Deal and the Fit for 55 plan for greenhouse gas emission reduction. Avisa spent US$570,000 lobbying in the United States in 2021.

Avisa Partners describes its specialties in which it "claim[s] real expertise: competition, trade, regulatory affairs (e.g. digital and media, energy, environment, telecommunications, financial services and corporate social responsibility), online advocacy and cyber-security".

=== Cybersecurity and copyright ===
Avisa Partners is involved, through its components Databack and LeakID, in cybersecurity and copyright. As of 2022, it had been involved in recovering patient data for a hospital in the town of Dax and in protecting the copyright of broadcasting a Champions League competition. The organisation carries out data recovery activities for targets of ransomware.

In mid 2022, from a quarter to half of Avisa Partners' revenue flow was from cybersecurity and copyright-related activities, according to the organisation.

=== Conference organising ===
As of 2022, Avisa Partners is involved in organising the Forum international de la cybersécurité, an international conference on the topic of cybersecurity, together with the National Gendarmerie, one of the two national-level French law enforcement agencies.

=== Competitive intelligence ===
In addition to cybersecurity, Avisa Partners carries out competitive intelligence. Avisa Partners describes its specialties in which it "claim[s] real expertise: competition, trade, regulatory affairs (e.g. digital and media, energy, environment, telecommunications, financial services and corporate social responsibility), online advocacy and cyber-security".

=== Fake online commentary ===
==== Club Med takeover bids ====
In January 2015, during takeover bids for Club Med by Fosun International and Andrea Bonomi, Le Journal du Net (JDN) found that a fake personality of a financial analyst, "Marc Fortin", had been created on JDN's own site and had analysed and criticised Bonomi's takeover bid. The fake personality had used a Twitter account, profiles on LinkedIn and Google+, a fake management diploma and work record. JDN traced similar fake accounts attacking Bonomi on Les Echos and Mediapart. JDN's analysis including tracing the IP address used to create the JDN fake analyst, and accused iStrat, as Avisa Partners was called at the time, and its owners Matthieu Creux and Arnaud Dassier of being responsible. Creux and Dassier denied the claim. JDN listed articles of the French criminal code in relation to the creation of false identities and distributing false information in relation to financial markets. IStrat stated that it would take legal action against anyone propagating "the false claims".

Challenges stated that it too had unwittingly allowed fake personalities to publish critical commentary in relation to the Club Med takeover bids. Challenges interviewed Arnaud Dassier, who stated that neither Fosun International nor its affiliated companies were clients of iStrat, and that he had no opinion on people who published online commentary under faked names.

==== Julien Fomenta Rosat ====
In June 2022, Julien Fomenta Rosat (a pseudonym) published a description in Fakir of how, starting in 2015, he had ghostwritten 595 articles on economics, energy geopolitics, renewable energy, health advice, glyphosate, and as a legal expert and risk auditor, based on no research or expertise in the subjects, for iStrat known under an alternative name, Maelstrom Media. His ghostwritten articles were mostly published under fake names. Some were signed by politicians or company executives. Pay rates started at €60 per article and successively increased to €110 to €200 per article after a few years. On the topic of glyphosate, Rosat was commissioned to write articles in favour of glyphosate and discrediting the International Agency for Research on Cancer.

IStrat hid its true name and its employees' names from Rosat. Rosat stated that he felt more and more uncomfortable with his ghostwriting. He investigated his employer and found JDN's 2015 article on iStrat, and inferred that "MM", to which he addressed the invoices for his ghostwritten articles, was iStrat/Maelstrom Media. Rosat's employer requested him to prepare an article attacking journalist François Ruffin, known for directing the film Merci patron!, critical of the French businessman Bernard Arnault. Rosat cooperated with Fakir, founded by Ruffin, letting Fakir ghostwrite the article attacking Ruffin. The article was published under the pseudonym "Kevin, political writer" with a photo from an image bank. Rosat compared an identity number on the invoice for the article with identity numbers on previous articles he had written for iStrat, and inferred that the client ordering the article attacking Ruffin was likely to be Arnault.

Rosat quit his work for iStrat/Maelstrom Media at the end of 2021, when he talked to journalist Sylvain Pak about his ghostwriting for the firm.

==== Mediapart ====
Mediapart stated that 634 blog articles by 100 fake author profiles had been published in its user-contributed content by Avisa Partners. The aims of the blogs were to describe Avisa's clients positively or to denigrate opponents.

==== Uber files ====
According to Le Monde, Uber hired iStrat to manipulate public debate in 2014. Uber Files documents show that iStrat published 19 fake articles on 13 websites, including Challenge, Les Echos, Le Journal du Net and Mediapart, during November and December 2014, while a legal case concerning UberPop was being considered by the Tribunal de commerce de Paris.

==== Wikipedia ====
In July 2022, Avisa Partners was found to have intervened in the online encyclopedia Wikipedia on behalf of the president of the Republic of Congo, Denis Sassou Nguesso and for CAC 40 businesspeople.

==== Fake news websites ====
According to Marianne, Avisa Partners bought or created three news websites dedicated to fake articles: Monde de l'énergie, Revue Internationale, and Raison d'être.

== Clients ==
Clients of Avisa Partners have included the European Commission, the French Ministry of Armed Forces, CAC 40 businesses including LVMH and Société Générale, Kazakhstan, and president of the Republic of the Congo Denis Sassou Nguesso, described by Marianne as a dictator.

== Relations with secret services ==
Jeune Afrique stated in 2021 that Avisa Partners had regular meetings with the Directorate-General for External Security, France's foreign intelligence agency, for preventing Avisa's actions in Africa from conflicting with those of the French government.

== See also ==
- Internet Research Agency
- Uber files
