= Semafo =

Canadian-based mining company

SEMAFO Inc.
- Company type: Public
- Traded as: TSX: SMF
- Industry: Gold Mines
- Headquarters: Montreal, Quebec, Canada
- Key people: Benoit Desormeaux, CPA, CA (CEO) Martin Milette, CPA, CA (CFO)
- Parent: Endeavour Mining
- Website: www.semafo.com

SEMAFO Inc. was a Canadian-based mining company with gold production and exploration activities in West Africa until 2020 when it was acquired by Endeavour Mining. The name SEMAFO is an acronym for "Mining Exploration Society in West Africa". Its headquarters were based in Montreal, Canada. The corporation owned and operated the Mana Mine in Burkina Faso, the third-largest gold mine in Burkina Faso, and reached commercial production at the Boungou Mine on September 1, 2018. The company was listed on the Toronto stock exchange, as well as on the Nasdaq OMX in Stockholm.

SEMAFO has been involved in many controversial incidents throughout its existence. It has been connected to instances of severe repression of local populations in places such as Guinea, Burkina Faso, and Niger. Accusations have been levelled at the corporation for supporting the corrupt regimes of Blaise Compaoré and the military junta which replaced him in Burkina Faso. The corporation has been involved in strike-breaking in Niger in which locals protested the destruction of the local ecosystem and the "slave wages" paid by SEMAFO. SEMAFO is also notorious for tax evasion- evading taxes of up to as much as 9.6 million dollars in Guinea.

== Mana Mine ==
The Mana Mine is located about 250 kilometers west of Ouagadougou and includes the high-grade Siou deposit. The mineral resource is located within the Houndé volcano-sedimentary belt, which is formed by Paleoproterozoic rocks belonging to the Birimian basement rock. Development of an underground mine at Siou is underway with full production expected in the first quarter of 2020.

== Boungou Mine ==
The Boungou Mine is located 320 kilometers east of Ouagadougou. The mineral resources are located within the Diapaga volcano-sedimentary belt, which also belongs to the Birimian basement rock.
