= Colin Bell (footballer, born 1946) =

English professional footballer (1946–2021)

Colin Bell MBE
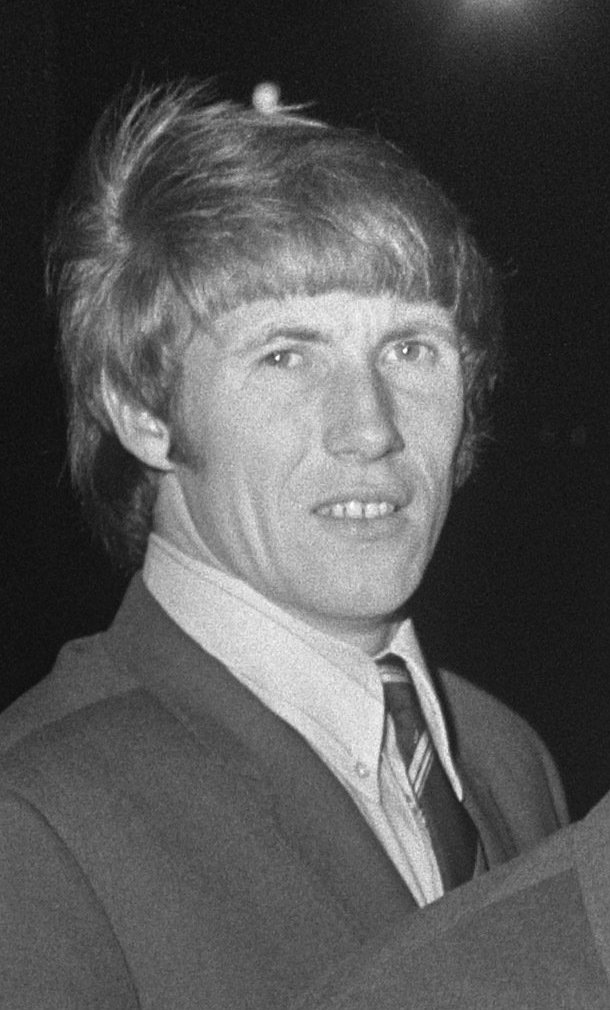
- Bell in 1969

Personal information
- Date of birth: 26 February 1946
- Place of birth: Hesleden, England
- Date of death: 5 January 2021 (aged 74)
- Height: 6 ft 0 in (1.83 m)
- Position: Midfielder

Youth career
- Horden Colliery Welfare Juniors

Senior career*
Years	Team	Apps	(Gls)
1963–1966	Bury	82	(25)
1966–1979	Manchester City	394	(117)
1980	San Jose Earthquakes	5	(0)
Total		481	(142)

International career
1968	England U23	2	(1)
1968–1975	England	48	(9)
1970–1974	The Football League XI	4	(1)
Medal record
Representing England
UEFA European Championship
Third place	1968 Italy
- * Club domestic league appearances and goals

Colin Bell MBE (26 February 1946 – 5 January 2021) was an English professional footballer who played as a midfielder. Bell, known for his thirteen-year spell at Manchester City, is regarded as the club's greatest-ever player, and was part of the Bell–Lee–Summerbee trio in the late 1960s and 1970s. Bell made 48 appearances for the England national football team; he was an unused squad member at UEFA Euro 1968 and played in three matches at the 1970 FIFA World Cup.

During his playing career, he was nicknamed "The King of the Kippax" (after Maine Road's Kippax Street terraced stand renowned for its singing) and Nijinsky (after the famous racehorse, due to his renowned stamina). In 2004, the West Stand of City of Manchester Stadium was later named in his honour.

== Club career ==
Bell began his career at Bury where he was swiftly made club captain. In total, Bell made 82 league appearances for Bury (in three seasons) and scored 25 goals. In 1966, he moved to Manchester City (who were managed by Joe Mercer) for £45,000. When trying to sign him for Manchester City, assistant manager Malcolm Allison misled other clubs interested in Bell (including Leicester City) by claiming that the player was "hopeless". Allison's stratagem succeeded as Bell ultimately signed for City. In the 1965–66 season, Bell helped City finish first in the Second Division, earning the team promotion to the First Division. Bell scored the only goal (via a header) in a 1–0 victory against Rotherham which ensured promotion. In the 1966–67 season, Bell was City's top scorer with 14 league goals, and the team finished in 15th place in the First Division. Bell scored a hat trick in a 3–1 victory against Stoke City in April that season.

In the 1967–68 season, Bell helped City win their second League Championship (they had won their first in 1937). Bell scored 14 league goals that season. One of his goals came in the famous 4–1 victory against Tottenham Hotspur, at Maine Road, which was dubbed the "Ballet on Ice" due to the snowy conditions in which the game was played. Mike Summerbee, Tony Coleman and Neil Young scored City's other goals while Jimmy Greaves scored the goal for Spurs. After the game, legendary centre forward Dixie Dean informed Allison that the City team which had beaten Spurs was "the most brilliant side I have ever seen". In the penultimate game of the season, Bell scored twice in a 3–1 victory against Tottenham Hotspur at White Hart Lane. In the game, Lee and Summerbee stretched the Spurs defence allowing Bell a clear run at a slowing Dave Mackay which overwhelmed the Scotsman. In the final game of the season, City defeated Newcastle United 4–3, to clinch the title. Bell assisted Lee with the "best pass of the afternoon" to score City's fourth goal.

In the 1968–69 season, Bell again scored 14 league goals as City finished 13th in the First Division. Manchester City won the FA Cup that season with a 1–0 victory over Leicester City in the final thanks to a goal by Neil Young. In the 1969–70 season, Bell scored eleven league goals for City, who finished tenth in the league. Manchester City and Bell won two trophies, in 1970, the League Cup and the European Cup Winners' Cup. City defeated West Bromwich Albion 2–1 in the 1970 Football League Cup Final, in which Mike Doyle and Glyn Pardoe scored City's goals. City defeated Górnik Zabrze 2–1 in the 1970 European Cup Winners' Cup Final with goals from Young and Francis Lee.

In the 1970–71 season, Bell scored 13 goals for City, who finished eleventh in the First Division. In the following season, City challenged for the title but ultimately lost out to Derby County and finished fourth in the league. Bell scored 13 goals that season. In the 1972–73 season, City finished eleventh in the league. In the 1973–74 season, Bell helped City reach the 1974 Football League Cup Final, in which he scored in a 2–1 defeat to Wolverhampton Wanderers. Bell played for City in a 1–0 victory against Manchester United in the final game of the season. Denis Law scored the only goal in the game which confirmed United's relegation from the First Division. In the 1974–75 season, Bell scored 15 league goals. He was named in the 1974–75 Football League First Division PFA Team of the Year. In November 1975, at the age of 29, Bell severely injured his right knee against Manchester United in a challenge with Martin Buchan during a League Cup match at Maine Road. City went on to win the League Cup that season, defeating Newcastle 2–1 in the 1976 Football League Cup Final. Bell's prolonged absence due to his injury was a blow to Don Revie, who quit as manager of England in 1977. Bell returned to action in a 4–0 victory against Newcastle on Boxing Day in 1977. His introduction to the game, at half time, was greeted with rapturous applause. However, Bell's return to City was fleeting as he left City in the 1978–79 season. Malcolm Allison, who returned to City for a second spell as manager in 1979, convinced Bell that it was time to go. The then-chairman Peter Swales described Bell as the "finest tuned athlete" and "irreplaceable". This latter sentiment turned out to be true as Allison was not able to find a trio of talented players of the calibre of Bell, Summerbee and Lee as he had done in the past with Joe Mercer. Bell's testimonial took place in December 1978 and involved a Manchester team combining players from both Manchester City (such as Joe Corrigan, Willie Donachie, David Watson, Gary Owen, Asa Hartford and Peter Barnes) and Manchester United (such as Brian Greenhoff, Martin Buchan, Steve Coppell and Joe Jordan) and a Merseyside team combining players from both Liverpool (such as Ray Clemence, Kenny Dalglish and Graeme Souness) and Everton (such as Mick Lyons and Bob Latchford). A crowd of 23,936 watched the game. The Manchester team won 2–1. Bell tried to resurrect his career in 1980 with NASL side San Jose Earthquakes, where he joined former Manchester United player George Best. However, Bell ended up playing only five games for the club before retiring from football altogether.

== International career ==
Bell played twice for the England Under 23 team in 1968. He played in a 2–1 victory against Scotland Under 23 team in which Martin Chivers and Rodney Marsh scored for the England Under 23 team. He also played in a 4–0 victory against the Hungary Under 23 team. Bell scored one of the four goals. The other scorers were Chivers, Marsh and Joe Royle. In the same year, Bell was selected for the senior England squad for a match against Spain, in May, but was forced to withdraw from the squad due to injury. Bell was replaced by Peter Thompson. Later in the same month, Bell won his first cap for the senior England team against Sweden, where he helped inspire goals from Martin Peters, Bobby Charlton and Roger Hunt in a 3–1 victory. One journalist stated that Bell 'revealed high promise and fitted in splendidly'. Bell won his second cap in a 1–0 defeat to West Germany in which Brian Labone scored an own goal. Bell was part of the England squad for UEFA Euro 1968, which was ultimately won by Italy. England finished third in the tournament after defeating the Soviet Union in the third-place match.

In 1969, Bell distinguished himself in the national team, scoring England's only goal in a 1–0 victory over the Netherlands in an "all-action display". Bell was part of the England squad which toured South America in 1969. Brian Glanville contended that both Bell and Tottenham Hotspur midfielder Alan Mullery excelled on the tour. Bell gave England an early lead in a game against Brazil, but late goals from Tostão and Jairzinho gave Brazil a 2–1 victory. Bell also played in a 2–1 victory against Uruguay on the tour. He also helped England to win the 1968–69 British Home Championship. He played in a 2–1 victory against Wales in which Bobby Charlton and Francis Lee scored England's goals.

=== 1970 FIFA World Cup ===
Bell played in the 1969–70 British Home Championship, which was shared between England, Wales and Scotland. He replaced Keith Newton in a 3–1 victory against Northern Ireland. He was subsequently included in the England squad for the World Cup in Mexico. Glanville contends that Bell's excellence was threatening Bobby Charlton's place in the England team. England were seeking to replicate their performance in the 1966 FIFA World Cup, which they had won. Bell's City teammate Francis Lee was also included in the squad. In order to help the players acclimatise to the heat of Mexico, the team staged an intra-squad mini-olympics which saw Bell win every event. In the group stage, Bell came on as a substitute in a 1–0 defeat to Brazil, in which Jairzinho scored the only goal. Bell "added spark to the England offence in the latter stages" of the game. Bell started in the next game, a 1–0 victory against Czechoslovakia, in which Allan Clarke scored the only goal.

In the quarter-final, Bell replaced Bobby Charlton in a 2–3 defeat to West Germany. England had taken a 2–0 lead in the game through goals from Alan Mullery and Martin Peters. Franz Beckenbauer had pulled a goal back for West Germany before the substitution. Following the substitution of Charlton and another substitution (Peters was replaced by Norman Hunter), the Germans scored twice (Uwe Seeler and Gerd Müller were the scorers). Bell was involved in creating chances for England following his introduction. At one point in the game, Bell sent in a low cross to the near post, but Hurst headed the ball just wide of the far one. At another point in the game, Bell beat Beckenbauer in the German penalty area and was then knocked down by the German player, but England were not awarded a penalty. The substitution was deemed by some to be the negative (for England) turning point of the game. However, West Germany scored their first goal before Charlton was substituted, and the fact that the German team at the time had a habit of coming back in games indicates that it was questionable to blame the substitutions for England's defeat. West Germany were subsequently defeated by Italy 4–3 in the semi-final. Italy were eventually defeated 4–1 by Brazil in the final. Charlton asserted that the absence of Gordon Banks (he was replaced in goal by Peter Bonetti) through sickness was the most important factor in England's defeat to the West Germans. Similarly, Glanville argued that "had Banks played, England would surely have won". Geoff Hurst stated that "to suggest that Colin Bell's inclusion weakened the team is patently unfair". Alan Ball described the substitutions as wise given the need to rest players for the prospective semi-final.

=== Failure to qualify after 1970 ===
Bell also played for England in the 1971–72 British Home Championship which was shared with Scotland. Bell scored in a 3–0 victory against Wales (with Rodney Marsh and Emlyn Hughes scoring England's other goals). Bell also captained England (in Bobby Moore's absence) in a 1–0 defeat to Northern Ireland. In addition, Bell played in a 1–0 victory over Scotland (in which Alan Ball scored the winner). Bell also played in a 3–1 defeat and a 0–0 draw with West Germany in 1972, which meant that England failed to qualify for UEFA Euro 1972. In the first game, Sepp Maier had spilled a shot from Bell which Lee tapped in to equalise Uli Hoeneß' first half goal. However, late goals from Günter Netzer and Gerd Müller secured victory for the West Germans. In November 1972, Bell "cashed in on clever approach work by Alan Ball to score the decisive winning goal" in a 1–0 victory over Wales in a World Cup qualification game at Ninian Park. Bell played in the other qualification game against Wales at Wembley, which ended 1–1. Bell was described as having 'excellent technique' and rated as the 'best England player' in the game as he 'was always trying to find a way through the packed Welsh defence'.

In 1973, Bell scored in the 7–0 demolition of Austria. In the game Bell, along with Martin Peters and Tony Currie "dictated the pace and pattern of the match from midfield". Bell also helped England to win the 1972–73 British Home Championship. He played in a 2–1 victory against Northern Ireland, a 3–0 victory against Wales and a 1–0 victory against Scotland. Despite these successes, Bell was upset that he was unable to better make his name on the world stage when England failed to qualify for the 1974 FIFA World Cup. England had needed to defeat Poland to qualify. Poland's goalkeeper Jan Tomaszewski had been labelled "a clown" by Brian Clough before the match but turned in a man-of-the-match performance in which he repeatedly denied England's attackers (including Bell). The only goal that Tomaszewski conceded was an equalizing penalty from Allan Clarke. In drawing the game, Poland qualified for the finals in West Germany at the expense of England. England's failure led to manager Alf Ramsey's departure. Bell's former manager at Manchester City, Joe Mercer (who had left City in 1971), took over as caretaker of the national side and chose Bell to play in every game that he was in charge.

Bell also played for England in the 1973–74 British Home Championship which was shared with Scotland. Bell played in a 2–0 victory against Wales (in which Stan Bowles and Kevin Keegan were the scorers), a 1–0 victory against Northern Ireland and a 2–0 defeat to Scotland. Bell played for England in a 2–2 draw against Argentina in which Mick Channon and Frank Worthington scored for England and Mario Kempes scored twice for Argentina. He was also part of the England squad that toured Eastern Europe in the summer of 1974. This included a 1–1 draw with East Germany, in "which Martin Dobson, (Colin) Bell and Trevor Brooking dominated the match in midfield". In the second game of the tour, England defeated Bulgaria 1–0. The performance of England's midfield trio (Bell, Brooking and Dobson) in the game was described as "tremendous". In the last game of the tour (which was Mercer's last game as England manager), England drew 2–2 with Yugoslavia.

Bell scored a brace in Don Revie's first game in charge of England, a 3–0 victory over Czechoslovakia. Bell was described as 'one of the outstanding successes for England in their European Championship game with Czechoslovakia at Wembley'. A Daily Mirror journalist described Bell as the 'man of the match'. One journalist described 'Bell's first goal as one of the best I've seen at Wembley. It began with a superb 30-yard pass through the Czech defence by Channon and Bell, running like an antelope, slid the ball past the goalkeeper'. In Revie's third game in charge, Bell helped England defeat the then World Champions, Germany, 2–0, in 1975, at the one hundredth international game played at Wembley Stadium. The team that beat the Germans in that game consisted of a forward line-up of Channon, Keegan, Malcolm Macdonald, Alan Hudson and Alan Ball, as well as Bell. Channon commented that he did not understand why Revie did not continue with this line-up which he considered was as good as any forward line England had had since 1970. In the game against the West Germans, the energy and tackling of Bell and Ball had freed Hudson to show his full range of playmaking skills. Bell also helped England to win the 1974–75 British Home Championship. Bell played in a 0–0 draw with Northern Ireland, and a 5–1 victory against Scotland (in which he also scored). Bell was rested for the game with Wales, which ended in a 2–2 draw. One journalist commenting about Bell's absence before that game stated that 'England will undoubtedly miss the non-stop running and 100 per cent effort of the consistent Colin Bell'. Bell won his last cap in a 2–1 defeat to Czechoslovakia in October 1975. Bell was named in the provisional squad for the 1975–76 British Home Championship but was unable to feature due to injury.

==== Other international appearances ====
In January 1973, Bell played for the New European Common Market (NECM), alongside Peter Storey, Emlyn Hughes, Bobby Moore, Bobby Charlton and Alan Ball, in the match celebrating the admission to the European Common Market of the United Kingdom, the Republic of Ireland and Denmark. NECM defeated the Old European Common Market (OECM) 2–0. In addition, in March 1974, Bell scored a goal in a 5–0 victory for The Football League XI against the Scottish Football League XI at Maine Road.

== Later life ==
Bell subsequently became a coach for the youth and reserve teams of Manchester City, as well as one of its club ambassadors. He was awarded an MBE in 2004 for services to the community.

Bell was diagnosed with bowel cancer shortly after his autobiography, Reluctant Hero, was released in 2005. He detailed how his mother died from that same disease and was encouraged to have it examined himself. He was operated on within three weeks of the diagnosis. He died on 5 January 2021 at the age of 74. He suffered from a short illness in the time leading up to his death. On 6 January 2021, Manchester City's players walked out in retro shirts bearing Bell's No 8 for a Carabao Cup semi-final against Manchester United. City won the game 2–0 with goals from John Stones and Fernandinho. Manchester City manager Pep Guardiola dedicated the victory to Bell, stating that 'it's an honour to dedicate this victory to Colin Bell and his family'. Guardiola also stated that 'when Colin Bell has a stand at the Etihad, when his name is the King [of the Kippax], it's because he was something special'. Stones also dedicated the victory to Bell stating that 'how we played in this match was a reflection of him'. On 9 January 2021, the actor Timothy Dalton narrated a tribute to Bell on the BBC programme Football Focus. In May 2022, Manchester City unveiled a new home kit inspired by Bell.

== Legacy ==
Bell is regarded as one of England's finest-ever midfield players, being described by one commentator as "the most finished article in the modern game". Bell has been inducted into both the English Football Hall of Fame and the Manchester City Hall of Fame. In 1998 he was selected as one of the Football League 100 Legends. In his foreword to Colin Bell's autobiography, Bobby Charlton has stated that "Colin Bell was unquestionably a great player". Alan Mullery, another of Bell's former England teammates stated that Bell would "still be a star in today's football" and "would fit into any team". Another England teammate of Bell's, Kevin Keegan, has stated that Bell "had it all". England legend Tom Finney stated that "Colin Bell was as good as anything I've ever seen". George Best described Bell as a "brilliant player". Joe Royle described Bell as a "phenomenal natural athlete" and "a wonderful footballer". Steven Gerrard has been compared to Bell. Journalist Dave Maddock described Bell as "possibly the greatest midfield talent England has ever unearthed". In 2003, Manchester City moved into the new City of Manchester Stadium, and in February 2004, one of the ends, the west stand, was named after Bell as a tribute. Only four players have scored more goals than Bell for Manchester City in all competitions: Sergio Agüero with 260 goals, Eric Brook with 177 goals, Tommy Johnson with 166 goals and Erling Haaland with 154 goals. Bell scored 152 goals for Manchester City in all competitions. He was deemed by Goal.com to be England's twenty-sixth best-ever footballer. He is listed as the greatest-ever City player on the Times website, in Ian Penney's book The Essential History of Manchester City, and in the Manchester Evening News.

== Career statistics ==
=== Club ===
Appearances and goals by club, season and competition
Club	Season	League			National Cup		League Cup		Continental		Total	
Club	Season	Division	Apps	Goals	Apps	Goals	Apps	Goals	Apps	Goals	Apps	Goals
Bury	1963–64	Second Division	10	2							10	2
Bury	1964–65	Second Division	42	13	1		2				45	13
Bury	1965–66	Second Division	30	10	1						31	10
Bury	Total		82	25	2		2				86	25
Manchester City	1965–66	Second Division	11	4							11	4
Manchester City	1966–67	First Division	42	12	6	1	2	1			50	14
Manchester City	1967–68	First Division	35	14	4	2	4	1			43	17
Manchester City	1968–69	First Division	39	14	5		3	1	2		49	15
Manchester City	1969–70	First Division	31	11	2		6	5	9	5	48	21
Manchester City	1970–71	First Division	34	13	3	4	1		7	2	45	19
Manchester City	1971–72	First Division	33	12	2		1	2			36	14
Manchester City	1972–73	First Division	39	7	5	2	2	1	2		48	10
Manchester City	1973–74	First Division	41	7	2		11	3			54	10
Manchester City	1974–75	First Division	42	15	1		2	3			45	18
Manchester City	1975–76	First Division	20	6			5	1			25	7
Manchester City	1976–77	First Division	0	0								
Manchester City	1977–78	First Division	16+1	2	2		2				20+1	2
Manchester City	1978–79	First Division	10	0	1+1		1		3+1	1	15+2	1
Manchester City	Total		393+1	117	33+1	9	40	18	23+1	8	489+3	152
San Jose Earthquakes	1980	North American Soccer League	5	0							5	0
Career total			480+1	142	35+1	9	42	18	23+1	8	580+3	177

=== International ===
Scores and results list England's goal tally first, score column indicates score after each Bell goal.

List of international goals scored by Colin Bell
No.	Date	Venue	Opponent	Score	Result	Competition	Ref(s)
1	12 June 1969	Maracanã Stadium, Rio de Janeiro	Brazil	1–0	1–2	Friendly match	
2	5 November 1969	Olympic Stadium, Amsterdam	Netherlands	1–0	1–0	Friendly match	
3	20 May 1972	Ninian Park, Cardiff	Wales	3–0	3–0	British Home Championship	
4	15 November 1972	Ninian Park, Cardiff	Wales	1–0	1–0	1974 FIFA World Cup qualification	
5	26 September 1973	Empire Stadium, Wembley	Austria	7–0	7–0	Friendly match	
6	30 October 1974	Empire Stadium, Wembley	Czechoslovakia	2–0	3–0	1976 European Football Championship qualification	
7	30 October 1974	Empire Stadium, Wembley	Czechoslovakia	3–0	3–0	1976 European Football Championship qualification	
8	12 March 1975	Empire Stadium, Wembley	West Germany	1–0	2–0	Friendly match	
9	24 May 1975	Empire Stadium, Wembley	Scotland	3–0	5–1	British Home Championship	

== Honours ==
Manchester City

- Football League First Division: 1967–68
- Football League Second Division: 1965–66
- FA Cup: 1968–69
- Football League Cup: 1969–70, 1975–76; runner-up: 1973–74
- FA Charity Shield: 1968, 1972
- UEFA Cup Winners' Cup: 1969–70

England

- British Home Championship: 1968–69, 1969–70 (shared), 1971–72 (shared), 1972–73, 1973–74 (shared), 1974–75
- UEFA European Championship third place: 1968

Individual

- Manchester City Player of the Year: 1968
- PFA Team of the Year: 1974–75 First Division
- Football League 100 Legends: 1998
- Manchester City Hall of Fame: 2004
- English Football Hall of Fame: 2005
- Manchester City Top Scorer: 1967, 1970 (shared), 1971 (shared), 1975
- Member of the Order of the British Empire

== Publications ==
Bell, Colin; Cheeseman, Ian Colin Bell: Reluctant Hero, Mainstream Publishing
