= Tony Book =

English footballer and manager (1934–2025)

Personal information
- Full name: Anthony Keith Book
- Date of birth: 4 September 1934
- Place of birth: Bath, Somerset, England
- Date of death: 13 January 2025 (aged 90)
- Position: Right-back

Youth career
- 1951–1952: Peasedown Miners
- 1952–1955: Royal Army Medical Corps

Senior career*
Years	Team	Apps	(Gls)
1955–1956	Frome Town		
1956–1964	Bath City	387	(12)
1964	Toronto City		
1964–1966	Plymouth Argyle	81	(3)
1966–1974	Manchester City	244	(4)
Total		712	(19)

Managerial career
- 1974–1979: Manchester City
- 1989: Manchester City (caretaker manager)
- 1993: Manchester City (caretaker manager)
- * Club domestic league appearances and goals

Anthony Keith Book (4 September 1934 – 13 January 2025) was an English football player and coach who played as a right-back. Book spent a large part of his career in Non-League football with his home town club Bath City as well as other local sides Peasedown Miners and Frome Town FC, before entering league football with Plymouth Argyle. At the age of 31, he joined First Division Manchester City, where he became captain. Under Book's captaincy, Manchester City won four major trophies, making him the second-most decorated Manchester City captain of all-time. Book had a five-year tenure as Manchester City manager from 1974 to 1979, and subsequently held various coaching roles at the club until 1996. According to Book's former teammate Mike Summerbee, George Best described Book as his "most difficult opponent".

== Early life and non-league career ==
Book was born in Bath, but at the age of four moved to India when his father, an officer in the Somerset Light Infantry, was posted. During World War II, Book's father served in Burma, and Book lived with his mother and brothers in army quarters in a number of places in British India, including Mumbai and Multan. In September 1945, the Book family returned to England. Tony started secondary school in Bath, and gained his first experience in competitive football when he was selected to play for both Bath boys and Somerset boys.

After leaving school at 16, Book became an apprentice bricklayer and played amateur football as an inside-forward for Peasedown Miners, until he was called up for national service in 1952. While playing for his army team Book converted to the full-back position and had a trial with Chelsea courtesy of a recommendation from army teammate Frank Blunstone, but was not taken on.

After completing his national service, Book returned to his bricklaying job in Bath and started playing for Frome Town. During the 1955–56 season Frome suffered financial difficulties, and sent letters to all their players permitting them to leave if they wished. Book showed his letter to a colleague, who played for Bath City of the Southern League. He in turn informed the Bath chairman, and Book signed for the club in January 1956. He spent seven and a half years at Bath, becoming captain in the latter part of his Bath career, and winning the Southern League title in 1960. In the 1962 close season, Malcolm Allison became Bath manager, beginning a long association between the two.

== Professional career ==
At the close of the 1962–63 season, Allison received an offer to coach Canadian team Toronto City over the summer and took Book with him. Though Allison left after a short time to take up a position at Plymouth Argyle, Book stayed three months, in which time he was voted the best full-back in Canada.

Upon his return to England, Book was signed for Plymouth by Allison for a fee of £1,500, and Book entered the Football League for the first time at the age of 30, though Plymouth believed him to be 28 – Allison had advised Book to doctor his birth certificate as he thought the Plymouth board would not pay £1,500 for a 30-year-old. After making 81 league appearances, Book followed Malcolm Allison again to Manchester City two years later, this time for a transfer fee of £17,000. Manager Joe Mercer was initially reluctant to spend such a fee on a player over 30 years old, but was persuaded after Allison pointed out that Mercer's career had included a successful move at a similar age, when he joined Arsenal from Everton aged 32.

Book prospered under the management of Mercer and Allison. He made his Manchester City debut in the opening match of the 1966–67 season, a 1–1 draw with Southampton, and became a near-permanent fixture in the team. In his first season at the club he missed just one game, becoming the inaugural winner of the club's Player of the Year award in a season in which the club consolidated their position following promotion.

In the 1967 close season, Book was named captain following the transfer of previous captain Johnny Crossan to Middlesbrough, and was henceforth nicknamed Skip by his teammates. His first season as captain was a very successful one, leading Manchester City to their second league championship while playing every game. An Achilles injury sidelined Book for the first four months of the 1968–69 season, but he returned to the team in time for the start of their FA Cup run. In the week preceding the cup final, Book was named the 1969 Football Writers' Association Footballer of the Year Award, sharing the accolade with Dave Mackay. The following Saturday Manchester City played Leicester in the FA Cup final. Manchester City won 1–0, and captain Book lifted the trophy. The following season City became the first English team to win a European and domestic trophy in the same season, the European Cup Winners' Cup and the League Cup. Book retired from playing in 1974, passing the captaincy to Colin Bell. He made 242 football league appearances for the club, and for many years was City's most successful captain in terms of trophies won.

== Management career ==
In November 1973, Manchester City manager Johnny Hart resigned due to ill health, and Book took temporary responsibility for first-team affairs, and was named assistant manager when Ron Saunders became the next permanent manager. At this point Book retired from playing to concentrate on management. Saunders was sacked after less than six months, and Book again took on the caretaker role, and was appointed permanent manager one game later. The first notable victory of Book's management was a 1–0 Manchester derby win, best known for the back-heel scored by Denis Law. Book's first full season as manager resulted in an eighth-place finish, an improvement upon the previous season, when the team finished 14th.

In 1976, Book's City side won the League Cup, making him the first person to win the competition as both player and manager. City continued their run of form into the following season, enjoying an impressive league campaign where they finished in second place, only a point behind winners Liverpool. City were playing entertaining football in the late 1970s and regularly drawing crowds at Maine Road in excess of 40,000. Book remained manager until 1979, when he was replaced by his former mentor Malcolm Allison. In 1981 he was invited by new manager John Bond to look after Youth Development at the club. In 1986 working with another City legend, Glyn Pardoe, they coached a young City side that would win the FA Youth Cup for the first time that year. He then became a loyal stalwart to the club in several other roles until 1997, including as caretaker manager again in 1993. He joined Huddersfield Town in 1997 as Chief Scout under Brian Horton.

== Later life and death ==
As of 2008 Book was retired, but still held two honorary positions; he was Honorary President of Manchester City and Life President of the Manchester City Official Supporters Club. He was inducted into Manchester City's Hall of Fame in January 2004.

His brother Kim Book was a goalkeeper for Bournemouth & Boscombe Athletic, Northampton Town, Mansfield Town and Doncaster Rovers, while Kim's son Steve was also a goalkeeper, principally with Cheltenham Town.

Tony Book died on 13 January 2025, at the age of 90.

== Career statistics ==
Appearances and goals by club, season and competition
Club	Season	League			National cup		League cup		Europe		Other (Note: Includes Anglo-Italian League Cup, FA Community Shield and Texaco Cup.)		Total	
Club	Season	Division	Apps	Goals	Apps	Goals	Apps	Goals	Apps	Goals	Apps	Goals	Apps	Goals
Manchester City	1966–67	First Division	41	0	6	0	2	0	–	–	–	–	49	0
Manchester City	1967–68	First Division	42	1	4	0	4	1	–	–	–	–	50	2
Manchester City	1968–69	First Division	15	0	6	0	0	0	0	0	–	–	21	0
Manchester City	1969–70	First Division	38	0	2	0	7	0	9	0	1	0	57	0
Manchester City	1970–71	First Division	34	2	3	0	1	0	–	–	–	–	46	2
Manchester City	1971–72	First Division	40	1	2	0	2	0	–	–	–	–	45	1
Manchester City	1972–73	First Division	30	0	5	0	2	0	–	–	–	–	39	0
Manchester City	1973–74	First Division	4	0	–	–	–	–	–	–	–	–	7	0

== Honours ==
=== Player ===
Manchester City

- Football League First Division: 1967–68
- FA Cup: 1968–69
- Football League Cup: 1969–70
- FA Charity Shield: 1968, 1972
- European Cup Winners' Cup: 1969–70
- Anglo-Italian League Cup runner-up: 1970

Individual

- FWA Footballer of the Year: 1968–69 (joint winner)

=== Manager ===
Manchester City

- Football League Cup: 1975–76
