= 1969–70 in Scottish football =

Division One champions
- Celtic

Division Two champions
- Falkirk

Scottish Cup winners
- Aberdeen

League Cup winners
- Celtic

Junior Cup winners
- Blantyre Victoria

Teams in Europe
- Celtic, Dundee United, Dunfermline Athletic, Kilmarnock, Rangers

Scotland national team
- 1970 BHC, 1970 World Cup qualification

The 1969–70 season was the 97th season of competitive football in Scotland and the 73rd season of Scottish league football.

== Scottish League Division One ==
Pos	Team	Pld	W	D	L	GF	GA	GD	Pts
1	Celtic	34	27	3	4	96	33	+63	57
2	Rangers	34	19	7	8	67	40	+27	45
3	Hibernian	34	19	6	9	65	40	+25	44
4	Heart of Midlothian	34	13	12	9	50	36	+14	38
5	Dundee United	34	16	6	12	62	64	−2	38
6	Dundee	34	15	6	13	49	44	+5	36
7	Kilmarnock	34	13	10	11	62	57	+5	36
8	Aberdeen	34	14	7	13	55	45	+10	35
9	Morton	34	13	9	12	52	52	0	35
10	Dunfermline Athletic	34	15	5	14	45	45	0	35
11	Motherwell	34	11	10	13	49	51	−2	32
12	Airdrieonians	34	12	8	14	59	64	−5	32
13	St Johnstone	34	11	9	14	50	62	−12	31
14	Ayr United	34	12	6	16	37	52	−15	30
15	St Mirren	34	8	9	17	39	54	−15	25
16	Clyde	34	9	7	18	34	56	−22	25
17	Raith Rovers	34	5	11	18	32	67	−35	21
18	Partick Thistle	34	5	7	22	41	82	−41	17

Source: "1969-1970 First Division - SPFL Archive". SPFL.

Champions: Celtic
Relegated: Raith Rovers, Partick Thistle

== Scottish League Division Two ==
Pos	Team	Pld	W	D	L	GF	GA	GD	Pts	Promotion or relegation
1	Falkirk	36	25	6	5	94	34	+60	56	Promotion to the 1970–71 First Division
2	Cowdenbeath	36	24	7	5	81	35	+46	55	Promotion to the 1970–71 First Division
3	Queen of the South	36	22	6	8	72	49	+23	50	
4	Stirling Albion	36	18	10	8	70	40	+30	46	
5	Arbroath	36	20	4	12	76	39	+37	44	
6	Alloa Athletic	36	19	5	12	62	41	+21	43	
7	Dumbarton	36	17	6	13	55	46	+9	40	
8	Montrose	36	15	7	14	57	55	+2	37	
9	Berwick Rangers	36	15	5	16	67	55	+12	35	
10	East Fife	36	15	4	17	59	63	−4	34	
11	Albion Rovers	36	14	5	17	53	64	−11	33	
12	East Stirlingshire	36	14	5	17	58	75	−17	33	
13	Clydebank	36	10	10	16	47	65	−18	30	
14	Brechin City	36	11	6	19	47	74	−27	28	
15	Queen's Park	36	10	6	20	38	62	−24	26	
16	Stenhousemuir	36	10	6	20	47	89	−42	26	
17	Stranraer	36	9	7	20	56	75	−19	25	
18	Forfar Athletic	36	11	1	24	55	83	−28	23	
19	Hamilton Academical	36	8	4	24	42	92	−50	20	

Source: "1969-1970 Second Division - SPFL Archive". SPFL.

Promoted: Falkirk, Cowdenbeath

== Cups ==
Competition	Winner	Score	Runner-up
Scottish Cup 1969–70	Aberdeen	3 – 1	Celtic
League Cup 1969–70	Celtic	1 – 0	St Johnstone
Junior Cup	Blantyre Victoria	1 – 0 (rep.)	Penicuik Athletic

== Other honours ==
=== National ===
Competition	Winner	Score	Runner-up
Scottish Qualifying Cup – North	Elgin City	6 – 1 * †	Nairn County
Scottish Qualifying Cup – South	Glasgow University	5 – 4 *	St Cuthbert Wanderers

=== County ===
Competition	Winner	Score	Runner-up
Aberdeenshire Cup	Peterhead		
Ayrshire Cup	Ayr United	2 – 0	Kilmarnock
East of Scotland Shield	Hearts	3 – 2	Hibernian
Fife Cup	Dunfermline Athletic	1 – 0 *	Cowdenbeath
Glasgow Cup	Celtic	3 – 1	Rangers
Lanarkshire Cup	Airdrie	3 – 2	Motherwell
Stirlingshire Cup	Falkirk	1 – 0	Dumbarton

^{*} – aggregate over two legs
† – play off

=== Highland League ===
Top Three
Pos	Team	Pld	W	D	L	GF	GA	GD	Pts
1	Elgin City	30	24	1	5	101	28	+73	49
2	Inverness Caledonian	30	22	3	5	101	37	+64	47
3	Inverness Thistle	30	21	3	6	124	52	+72	45

== Individual awards ==
Award	Winner	Club
Footballer of the Year	(Scotland) Pat Stanton	Hibernian

== National team ==
=== 1970 FIFA World Cup ===
==== Qualification ====
===== Group 7 =====
Rank	Team	Pts	Pld	W	D	L	GF	GA	GD
1	West Germany	11	6	5	1	0	20	3	+17
2	Scotland	7	6	3	1	2	18	7	+11
3	Austria	6	6	3	0	3	12	7	+5
4	Cyprus	0	6	0	0	6	2	35	−33

Date	Venue	Opponents	Score	Competition	Scotland scorer(s)
21 September 1969	Dalymount Park, Dublin (A)	Republic of Ireland	1–1	Friendly	Colin Stein
22 October 1969	Volksparkstadion, Hamburg (A)	West Germany	2–3	WCQG7	Jimmy Johnstone, Alan Gilzean
5 November 1969	Praterstadion, Vienna (A)	Austria	0–2	WCQG7	
18 April 1970	Windsor Park, Belfast (A)	Northern Ireland	1–0	BHC	John O'Hare
22 April 1970	Hampden Park, Glasgow (H)	Wales	0–0	BHC	
25 April 1970	Hampden Park, Glasgow (H)	England	0–0	BHC	

Key:

- (H) = Home match
- (A) = Away match
- WCQG7 = World Cup qualifying – Group 7
- BHC = British Home Championship
