= 1972–73 Manchester City F.C. season =

English football club season

Manchester City
1972–73 season
- Manager: Malcolm Allison (to 30 Mar 1973); Johnny Hart (from 30 Mar 1973)
- Stadium: Maine Road
- First Division: 11th
- FA Cup: Fifth Round
- League Cup: Third Round
- FA Charity Shield: Winners
- UEFA Cup: First Round
- Top goalscorer: League: Rodney Marsh(15); All: Rodney Marsh(19)
- Highest home attendance: 54,478 vs Sunderland; 24 February 1973
- Lowest home attendance: 23,973 vs Chelsea; 27 March 1973
- Average home league attendance: 32,140 (8th highest in league)

The 1972–73 season was Manchester City's 71st season of competitive football and 53rd season in the top division of English football. In addition to the First Division, the club competed in the FA Cup, Football League Cup, FA Charity Shield and the UEFA Cup. Despite not winning the FA Cup or First Division the previous season, City were invited to play in the Charity Shield against Aston Villa, the 1971/72 Third Division champions, at Villa Park. City won the match 1-0 with a Francis Lee penalty late on.

== First Division ==
=== League table ===
Pos	Team	Pld	W	D	L	GF	GA	GAv	Pts
9	Newcastle United	42	16	13	13	60	51	1.176	45
10	Birmingham City	42	15	12	15	53	54	0.981	42
11	Manchester City	42	15	11	16	57	60	0.950	41
12	Chelsea	42	13	14	15	49	51	0.961	40
13	Southampton	42	11	18	13	47	52	0.904	40

Source: World Football
Rules for classification: 1) Points; 2) Goal average; 3) Goals scored

=== Results summary ===
Overall								Home						Away					
Pld	W	D	L	GF	GA	GAv	Pts	W	D	L	GF	GA	Pts	W	D	L	GF	GA	Pts
42	15	11	16	57	60	0.95	41	12	4	5	36	20	28	3	7	11	21	40	13

=== Results ===
Date	Opponents	H / A	Venue	Result F – A	Scorers	Attendance
12 August 1972	Liverpool	A	Anfield	0 - 2		55,383
16 August 1972	Everton	H	Maine Road	0 - 1		38,525
19 August 1972	Norwich City	H	Maine Road	3 - 0	Lee (2), Bell	30,920
23 August 1972	Derby County	A	Baseball Ground	0 – 1		31,173
26 August 1972	Chelsea	A	Stamford Bridge	1 - 2	Mellor	30,845
29 August 1972	Crystal Palace	A	Selhurst Park	0 - 1		24,731
2 September 1972	Leicester City	H	Maine Road	1 – 0	Marsh	27,233
9 September 1972	Birmingham City	A	St Andrews	1 - 4	Towers	32,983
16 September 1972	Tottenham Hotspur	H	Maine Road	2 – 1	Marsh (2)	31,755
23 September 1972	Stoke City	A	Victoria Ground	1 – 5	Lee	26,448
30 September 1972	West Bromwich Albion	H	Maine Road	2 – 1	Booth, Lee	27,332
7 October 1972	Wolverhampton Wanderers	H	Maine Road	1 – 1	Marsh	31,198
14 October 1972	Coventry City	A	Highfield Road	2 – 3	Marsh, Summerbee	24,560
21 October 1972	West Ham United	H	Maine Road	4 – 3	Towers, Marsh (2), Summerbee	30,890
28 October 1972	Arsenal	A	Highbury	0 – 0		45,536
4 November 1972	Derby County	H	Maine Road	4 - 0	Carrodus, Marsh, Bell, Todd (og)	35,556
11 November 1972	Everton	A	Goodison Park	3 – 2	Lee (2), Newton (og)	32,924
18 November 1972	Manchester United	H	Maine Road	3 - 0	Bell (2), Buchan (og)	52,050
25 November 1972	Leeds United	A	Elland Road	0 – 3		39,879
2 December 1972	Ipswich Town	H	Maine Road	1 - 1	Lee	27,839
9 December 1972	Sheffield United	A	Bramhall Lane	1 – 1	Bell	19,208
16 December 1972	Southampton	H	Maine Road	2 – 1	Marsh (2)	24,825
23 December 1972	Newcastle United	A	St James’ Park	1 – 2	Mellor	28,249
26 December 1972	Stoke City	H	Maine Road	1 – 1	Mellor	36,334
30 December 1972	Norwich City	A	Carrow Road	1 – 1	Towers	24,203
20 January 1973	Leicester City	A	Filbert Street	1 – 1	Bell	18,761
27 January 1973	Birmingham City	H	Maine Road	1 – 0	Donachie	31,882
10 February 1973	Tottenham Hotspur	A	White Hart Lane	3 – 2	Marsh, Lee (2)	30,994
17 February 1973	Liverpool	H	Maine Road	1 - 1	Booth	40,528
3 March 1973	Wolverhampton Wanderers	A	Molineux Stadium	1 – 5	Marsh	25,047
6 March 1973	Southampton	A	The Dell	1 – 1	Lee	16,188
10 March 1973	Coventry City	H	Maine Road	1 – 2	Booth	30,448
17 March 1973	West Ham United	A	Boleyn Ground	1 – 2	Doyle	30,156
24 March 1973	Arsenal	H	Maine Road	1 – 2	Booth	32,032
27 March 1973	Chelsea	H	Maine Road	0 – 1		23,973
31 March 1973	Leeds United	H	Maine Road	1 – 0	Towers	35,772
7 April 1973	Ipswich Town	A	Portman Road	1 – 1	Oakes	19,109
14 April 1973	Sheffield United	H	Maine Road	3 – 1	Lee, Bell, Marsh	26,811
18 April 1973	Newcastle United	H	Maine Road	2 – 0	Booth, Marsh	25,156
21 April 1973	Manchester United	A	Old Trafford	0 – 0		61,500
25 April 1973	West Bromwich Albion	A	The Hawthorns	2 – 1	Lee, Towers	21,193
28 April 1973	Crystal Palace	H	Maine Road	2 – 3	Lee (2)	34,784

== FA Cup ==
=== Results ===
Date	Round	Opponents	H / A	Venue	Result F – A	Scorers	Attendance
13 January 1973	Third round	Stoke City	H	Maine Road	3 – 2	Bell, Marsh, Summerbee	38,648
3 February 1973	Fourth round	Liverpool	A	Anfield	0 – 0		56,296
7 February 1973	Fourth round Replay	Liverpool	H	Maine Road	2 – 0	Bell, Booth	49,572
24 February 1973	Fifth round	Sunderland	H	Maine Road	2 – 2	Towers, Montgomery (og)	54,478
27 February 1973	Fifth round Replay	Sunderland	A	Roker Park	1 – 3	Lee	51,782

== Football League Cup ==
=== Results ===
Date	Round	Opponents	H / A	Venue	Result F – A	Scorers	Attendance
3 October 1972	Third round	Bury	A	Gigg Lane	0 – 2		16,614

== Charity Shield ==
5 August 1972 Charity Shield	Aston Villa	0-1	Manchester City	Birmingham
			Lee 70' (pen.)	Stadium: Villa Park; Attendance: 34,859; Referee: Norman Burtenshaw

== UEFA Cup ==
=== Results ===
Date	Round	Opponents	H / A	Venue	Result F – A	Scorers	Attendance
13 September 1972	First round 1st leg	Valencia	H	Maine Road	2 – 2	Mellor, Marsh	21,698
27 September 1972	First round 2nd leg	Valencia	A	Mestalla Stadium	1 – 2	Marsh	35,000
