= 1974–75 British Home Championship =

Tournament details
- Dates: 17–24 May 1975
- Teams: 4

Final positions
- Champions: England (50th title)
- Runners-up: Scotland

Tournament statistics
- Matches played: 6
- Goals scored: 18 (3 per match)
- Top scorer: (England) David Johnson (3)

The 1974–75 British Home Championship was an international football tournament between the British Home Nations. It resulted in a resounding victory for an England team which was going through one of the worst periods of consistent play in their history. The tournament saw several draws, including two dramatic 2–2 ties for the Welsh team against England and Scotland and a goalless draw between England and Northern Ireland. The Scots had begun better, beating the Irish 3–0 in their second game and so entered the final match with a real chance of victory. The Welsh, like the English, had a 2-point advantage in their final match, but failed to capitalise on this, losing to Northern Ireland and ending in last place. The final game, between England and Scotland was in the end a one-sided affair, the English crushing the Scots in a 5–1 rout and winning the tournament.

== Table ==
Team	Pld	W	D	L	GF	GA	GD	Pts
England (C)	3	1	2	0	7	3	+4	4
Scotland	3	1	1	1	6	7	−1	3
Northern Ireland	3	1	1	1	1	3	−2	3
Wales	3	0	2	1	4	5	−1	2

Rules for classification: 1) points. The points system worked as follows: 2 points for a win and 1 point for a draw.
(C) Champions

== Results ==
17 May 1975

Northern Ireland	0–0	England

Windsor Park, Belfast
Referee: Thomas Reynolds (Wales)

17 May 1975

Wales	2–2	Scotland
Toshack 28'; Flynn 36'		Jackson 52'; Rioch 61'

Ninian Park, Cardiff
Referee: Malcolm Wright (Northern Ireland)

20 May 1975

Scotland	3–0	Northern Ireland
MacDougall 15'; Dalglish 21'; Parlane 80'

Hampden Park, Glasgow
Referee: Pat Partridge (England)

21 May 1975

England	2–2	Wales
Johnson 10', 84'		Toshack 55'; Griffiths 56'

Wembley Stadium, London
Referee: John Patterson (Scotland)

23 May 1975

Northern Ireland	1–0	Wales
Finney 23'

Windsor Park, Belfast
Referee: Jack Taylor (England)

24 May 1975

England	5–1	Scotland
Francis 6', 64'; Beattie 7'; Bell 40'; Johnson 73'		Rioch 42' (pen.)

Wembley Stadium, London
Referee: Rudi Glöckner (East Germany)
