= 1973–74 Manchester City F.C. season =

English football club season

Manchester City
1973–74 season
- Manager: Johnny Hart (until 22 Oct 1973); Tony Book (caretaker); Ron Saunders (from 22 Nov 1973 to 12 April 1974); Tony Book (from 12 April 1974)
- Stadium: Maine Road
- First Division: 14th
- FA Cup: Fourth Round
- League Cup: Runners-up
- FA Charity Shield: Runners-up
- Top goalscorer: League: Francis Lee(10); All: Francis Lee(18)
- Highest home attendance: 51,331 vs Manchester United; 13 March 1974
- Lowest home attendance: 19,428 vs Walsall; 22 October 1973
- Average home league attendance: 30,484 (7th highest in league)

The 1973–74 season was Manchester City's 72nd season of competitive football and 54th season in the top division of English football. In addition to the First Division, the club competed in the FA Cup, Football League Cup and the FA Charity Shield. The season on a whole was relatively disappointing; the club finished in a poor position in the league, as well as suffering defeat to Wolves in the League Cup Final. However, the final match of the season was one to remember, as City went to Old Trafford and sent Manchester United down with a goal late on, scored by former United legend Denis Law. Although United would have been relegated anyway, the fans on the terraces believed otherwise, as a pitch invasion ensued in an attempt to get the match abandoned. The match was in fact abandoned, but it was decided that the 1-0 City win should stand.

== First Division ==
=== League table ===
Pos	Team	Pld	W	D	L	GF	GA	GAv	Pts	Qualification or relegation
12	Wolverhampton Wanderers	42	13	15	14	49	49	1.000	41	Qualification for the UEFA Cup first round (Note: Wolverhampton Wanderers qualified for the UEFA Cup as the 1973-74 Football League Cup winners.)
13	Sheffield United	42	14	12	16	44	49	0.898	40	
14	Manchester City	42	14	12	16	39	46	0.848	40	
15	Newcastle United	42	13	12	17	49	48	1.021	38	
16	Coventry City	42	14	10	18	43	54	0.796	38	

Source: World Football
Rules for classification: 1) Points; 2) Goal average; 3) Goals scored

=== Results summary ===
Overall								Home						Away					
Pld	W	D	L	GF	GA	GAv	Pts	W	D	L	GF	GA	Pts	W	D	L	GF	GA	Pts
42	14	12	16	39	46	0.848	40	10	7	4	25	17	27	4	5	12	14	29	13

=== Results ===
Date	Opponents	H / A	Venue	Result F – A	Scorers	Attendance
25 August 1973	Birmingham City	H	Maine Road	3 - 1	Law (2), Bell	34,178
29 August 1973	Derby County	A	Baseball Ground	0 - 1		31,295
1 September 1973	Stoke City	A	Victoria Ground	1 – 1	Law	22,434
5 September 1973	Coventry City	H	Maine Road	1 – 0	Marsh	30,931
8 September 1973	Norwich City	H	Maine Road	2 - 1	Lee, Bell	31,209
11 September 1973	Coventry City	A	Highfield Road	1 - 2	Marsh	27,394
15 September 1973	Leicester City	A	Filbert Street	1 – 1	Bell	28,466
22 September 1973	Chelsea	H	Maine Road	3 - 2	Towers, Lee (2)	32,118
29 September 1973	Burnley	A	Turf Moor	0 – 3		24,492
6 October 1973	Southampton	H	Maine Road	1 – 1	Marsh	27,727
13 October 1973	Newcastle United	A	St James Park	0 – 1		35,225
20 October 1973	Sheffield United	A	Bramhall Lane	2 – 1	Law, Dearden (og)	25,234
27 October 1973	Leeds United	H	Maine Road	0 – 1		45,346
3 November 1973	Wolverhampton Wanderers	A	Molineux Stadium	0 – 0		21,499
10 November 1973	Arsenal	H	Maine Road	1 – 2	Lee	31,041
17 November 1973	Queens Park Rangers	H	Maine Road	1 - 0	Lee	30,486
24 November 1973	Ipswich Town	A	Portman Road	1 – 2	Leman	19,143
8 December 1973	West Ham United	A	Boleyn Ground	1 - 2	Lee	20,790
15 December 1973	Tottenham Hotspur	A	White Hart Lane	2 – 0	Booth, Bell	17,066
22 December 1973	Burnley	H	Maine Road	2 - 0	Bell, Doyle	28,114
26 December 1973	Everton	A	Goodison Park	0 – 2		36,007
29 December 1973	Norwich City	A	Carrow Road	1 – 1	Law	24,303
1 January 1974	Stoke City	H	Maine Road	0 – 0		35,009
12 January 1974	Leicester City	H	Maine Road	2 – 0	Law, Marsh	27,488
19 January 1974	Birmingham City	A	St Andrews	1 – 1	Law	31,401
2 February 1974	Tottenham Hotspur	H	Maine Road	0 – 0		24,652
6 February 1974	Derby County	H	Maine Road	1 – 0	Bell	22,846
9 February 1974	Chelsea	A	Stamford Bridge	0 – 1		20,206
23 February 1974	Southampton	A	The Dell	2 - 0	Marsh, Law	19,234
9 March 1974	Leeds United	A	Elland Road	0 – 1		36,578
13 March 1974	Manchester United	H	Maine Road	0 – 0		51,331
16 March 1974	Sheffield United	H	Maine Road	0 – 1		26,220
23 March 1974	Arsenal	A	Highbury	0 – 2		25,319
27 March 1974	Newcastle United	H	Maine Road	2 – 1	Lee (2)	21,590
30 March 1974	Wolverhampton Wanderers	H	Maine Road	1 – 1	Lee	25,234
2 April 1974	Everton	H	Maine Road	1 – 1	Tueart	22,918
6 April 1974	Ipswich Town	H	Maine Road	1 – 3	Summerbee	22,269
9 April 1974	Queens Park Rangers	A	Loftus Road	0 – 3		20,461
12 April 1974	Liverpool	H	Maine Road	1 – 1	Lee	43,248
16 April 1974	Liverpool	A	Anfield	0 – 4		50,781
20 April 1974	West Ham United	H	Maine Road	2 – 1	Booth, Bell	29,700
27 April 1974	Manchester United	A	Old Trafford	1 – 0	Law	56,966

== FA Cup ==
=== Results ===
Date	Round	Opponents	H / A	Venue	Result F – A	Scorers	Attendance
5 January 1974	3rd Round	Oxford United	A	Manor Ground	5 – 2	Law (2), Summerbee (2), Marsh	13,435
26 January 1974	4th Round	Nottingham Forest	A	City Ground	1 – 4	Carrodus	41,472

== Football League Cup ==
=== Results ===
Date	Round	Opponents	H / A	Venue	Result F – A	Scorers	Attendance
2 October 1973	2nd Round	Walsall	A	Fellows Park	0 – 0		12,943
22 October 1973	2nd Round Replay	Walsall	H	Maine Road	0 – 0		19,428
30 October 1973	2nd Round 2nd Replay	Walsall	N	Old Trafford	4 – 0	Lee (3), Bell	13,646
6 November 1973	3rd Round	Carlisle United	A	Brunton Park	1 – 0	Lee	14,472
21 November 1973	4th Round	York City	A	Bootham Crescent	0 – 0		15,360
5 December 1973	4th Round Replay	York City	H	Maine Road	4 – 1	Marsh (3), Lee	17,927
18 December 1973	5th Round	Coventry City	A	Highfield Road	2 – 2	Booth, Leman	12,661
16 January 1974	5th Round Replay	Coventry City	H	Maine Road	4 – 2	Summerbee, Lee (2), Law	25,409
23 January 1974	Semi final 1st leg	Plymouth Argyle	A	Home Park	1 – 1	Booth	30,390
30 January 1974	Semi final 2nd leg	Plymouth Argyle	H	Maine Road	2 – 0	Lee, Bell	40,117

=== Final ===
2 March 1974
15:30 GMT

Manchester City	1–2	Wolverhampton Wanderers
Bell 59'		Hibbitt 44'; Richards 85'

Wembley Stadium, London
Attendance: 97,886
Referee: Dave Wallace (Crewe)

== Charity Shield ==
=== Details ===
18 August 1973
15:00 BST

Manchester City	0–1	Burnley
		Waldron 66'

Maine Road, Manchester
Attendance: 23,988
Referee: Gordon Hill (Leicester)

Manchester City	Burnley

GK	1	(England) Joe Corrigan
DF	2	(England) Tony Book (c)
DF	3	(Scotland) Willie Donachie
DF	4	(England) Mike Doyle
DF	5	(England) Tommy Booth
MF	6	(England) Alan Oakes
MF	7	(England) Mike Summerbee
MF	8	(England) Colin Bell
FW	9	(Scotland) Denis Law
FW	10	(England) Francis Lee
FW	11	(England) Rodney Marsh
Substitute:
FW	12	(England) Frank Carrodus (unused)
Manager:
(England) Johnny Hart

GK	1	(England) Alan Stevenson
DF	2	(England) Mick Docherty
DF	3	(England) Keith Newton
MF	4	(England) Martin Dobson (c)
DF	5	(England) Colin Waldron
DF	6	(Scotland) Jim Thomson
MF	7	(England) Geoff Nulty
FW	8	(England) Frank Casper
FW	9	(England) Paul Fletcher
MF	10	(England) Doug Collins
FW	11	(Wales) Leighton James
Substitute:
MF	12	(England) Billy Ingham (unused)
Manager:
(England) Jimmy Adamson
