= 1968–69 Manchester City F.C. season =

English football club season

Manchester City
1968–69 season
- Manager: Joe Mercer
- Stadium: Maine Road
- First Division: 13th
- FA Cup: Winners
- League Cup: Third round
- FA Charity Shield: Winners
- European Cup: First round
- Top goalscorer: League: Colin Bell and Neil Young (14); All: Francis Lee (18)
- Highest home attendance: 63,052 vs Manchester United; 17 August 1968
- Lowest home attendance: 20,108 vs Newcastle United; 5 May 1969
- Average home league attendance: 33,750 (9th highest in league)

The 1968–69 season was Manchester City's 67th season in existence and 49th season in the top division of English football. In addition to the domestic league, the club competed in the FA Cup, League Cup, Charity Shield and European Cup, making their first and last appearance in the latter until the 2011–12 season. The club also won its fourth FA Cup, which earned them participation into the 1969–70 European Cup Winners' Cup. They wouldn't win another FA Cup until the 2010/11 season.

== First Division ==
=== League table ===
Pos	Team	Pld	W	D	L	GF	GA	GAv	Pts	Qualification or relegation
11	Manchester United	42	15	12	15	57	53	1.075	42	
12	Ipswich Town	42	15	11	16	59	60	0.983	41	
13	Manchester City	42	15	10	17	64	55	1.164	40	Qualification for the European Cup Winners' Cup first round (Note: Manchester City qualified for the European Cup Winners' Cup as the 1968-69 FA Cup winners.)
14	Burnley	42	15	9	18	55	82	0.671	39	
15	Sheffield Wednesday	42	10	16	16	41	54	0.759	36	

Source: World Football
Rules for classification: 1) Points; 2) Goal average; 3) Goals scored

=== Results summary ===
Overall								Home						Away					
Pld	W	D	L	GF	GA	GAv	Pts	W	D	L	GF	GA	Pts	W	D	L	GF	GA	Pts
42	15	10	17	64	55	1.164	40	13	6	2	49	20	32	2	4	15	15	35	8

=== Matches ===
Date	Opponents	H / A	Venue	Result F–A	Scorers	Attendance
10 August 1968	Liverpool	A	Anfield	1–2	Young	51,236
14 August 1968	Wolverhampton Wanderers	H	Maine Road	3–2	Lee, Summerbee (2)	35,835
17 August 1968	Manchester United	H	Maine Road	0-0		63,052
21 August 1968	Leicester City	A	Filbert Street	0–3		30,076
24 August 1968	Queens Park Rangers	A	Loftus Road	1-1	Doyle	19,716
27 August 1968	Arsenal	A	Highbury	1–4	Bell	40,767
31 August 1968	Ipswich Town	H	Maine Road	1-1	Bell	31,303
7 September 1968	Stoke City	A	Victoria Ground	0–1		22,015
14 September 1968	Southampton	H	Maine Road	1-1	Coleman	29,031
21 September 1968	Sunderland	A	Roker Park	4–0	Summerbee, Bell, Lee (2)	31,687
28 September 1968	Leeds United	H	Maine Road	3–1	Bell (2), Young	46,431
5 October 1968	Everton	A	Goodison Park	0–2		55,649
9 October 1968	Arsenal	H	Maine Road	1-1	Bell	33,830
12 October 1968	Tottenham Hotspur	H	Maine Road	4–0	Coleman, Lee (2), Connor	38,119
19 October 1968	Coventry City	A	Highfield Road	1-1	Bruck (og)	30,670
26 October 1968	Nottingham Forest	H	Maine Road	3-3	Bell, Young, Hindley (og)	32,937
2 November 1968	Chelsea	A	Stamford Bridge	0–2		40,700
9 November 1968	Sheffield Wednesday	H	Maine Road	0–1		23,861
16 November 1968	Newcastle United	A	St James’ Park	0–1		36,400
23 November 1968	West Bromwich Albion	H	Maine Road	5–1	Young (2), Bell (2), Doyle	24,867
30 November 1968	West Ham United	A	Boleyn Ground	1–2	Lee	33,082
7 December 1968	Burnley	H	Maine Road	7–0	Young (2), Bell (2), Coleman, Doyle, Lee	31,009
14 December 1968	Tottenham Hotspur	A	White Hart Lane	1-1	Lee	28,462
21 December 1968	Coventry City	H	Maine Road	4–2	Booth, Young (2), Curtis (og)	27,760
26 December 1968	Everton	H	Maine Road	1–3	Bell	53,549
11 January 1969	Chelsea	H	Maine Road	4–1	Young, Lee, Owen (2)	35,606
18 January 1969	Sheffield Wednesday	A	Hillsborough	1-1	Young	33,074
4 March 1969	Burnley	A	Turf Moor	1–2	Bell	18,348
8 March 1969	Manchester United	A	Old Trafford	1–0	Summerbee	63,388
11 March 1969	Ipswich Town	A	Portman Road	1–2	Doyle	24,312
15 March 1969	Queens Park Rangers	H	Maine Road	3–1	Lee, Bowyer, Young	28,859
24 March 1969	Nottingham Forest	A	City Ground	0–1		24,613
29 March 1969	Stoke City	H	Maine Road	3–1	Bell, Doyle, Owen	27,337
4 April 1969	Leicester City	H	Maine Road	2–0	Summerbee (2)	42,022
5 April 1969	Leeds United	A	Elland Road	0–1		43,176
8 April 1969	Wolverhampton Wanderers	A	Molineux Stadium	1–3	Lee	28,533
12 April 1969	Sunderland	H	Maine Road	1–0	Young	22,842
16 April 1969	West Bromwich Albion	A	The Hawthorns	0–2		25,030
19 April 1969	Southampton	A	The Dell	0–3		26,254
30 April 1969	West Ham United	H	Maine Road	1-1	Pardoe	31,846
5 May 1969	Newcastle United	H	Maine Road	1–0	Young	20,108
12 May 1969	Liverpool	H	Maine Road	1–0	Lee	28,309

== FA Cup ==
4 January 1969 Third round	Manchester City	1-0	Luton Town	Manchester
	Lee 26' (pen.)			Stadium: Maine Road; Attendance: 37,120; Referee: K Burns

25 January 1969 Fourth round	Newcastle United	0-0	Manchester City	Newcastle
				Stadium: St James Park; Attendance: 55,680; Referee: E Jennings

29 January 1969 Fourth round replay	Manchester City	2-0	Newcastle United	Norwich
	Young 6'; Owen 69'			Stadium: Carrow Road; Attendance: 60,844; Referee: E Jennings

24 February 1969 Fifth round	Blackburn Rovers	1-4	Manchester City	Blackburn
	Fryatt 58'		Lee 13', 73'; Coleman 59', 78'	Stadium: Ewood Park; Attendance: 42,351; Referee: R Harper

=== Quarter Final ===
1 March 1969 Quarter Final	Manchester City	1-0	Tottenham Hotspur	Manchester
	Lee 54' (pen.)			Stadium: Maine Road; Attendance: 48,872; Referee: W Gow

=== Semi Final ===
22 March 1969 Semi Final	Manchester City	1-0	Everton	Birmingham
	Booth 89'			Stadium: Villa Park; Attendance: 65,000; Referee: W Handley

=== Final ===
26 April 1969 Final	Manchester City	1-0	Leicester City	Wembley
	Young 23'			Stadium: Wembley Stadium; Attendance: 100,000; Referee: George McCabe

== Football League Cup ==
=== Results ===
Date	Round	Opponents	H / A	Venue	Result F – A	Scorers	Attendance
25 September 1968	3rd Round	Blackpool	A	Bloomfield Road	0 – 1		23,795

== Charity Shield ==
3 August 1968 Charity Shield	Manchester City	6-1	West Bromwich Albion	Manchester
	Owen 1', 59'; Lovett 5' (o.g.); Lee 40', 90'; Young 62'		Krzywicki 43'	Stadium: Maine Road; Attendance: 35,510; Referee: Harry New

== European Cup ==
=== Results ===
Date	Round	Opponents	H / A	Venue	Result F – A	Scorers	Attendance
18 September 1968	1st Round 1st leg	Fenerbahce	H	Maine Road	0 – 0		38,787
2 October 1968	1st Round 2nd leg	Fenerbahce	A	Şükrü Saracoğlu Stadium	1 – 2	Coleman	45,000

== Awards ==
=== FWA Footballer of the Year ===
Player
(England) Tony Book
