= Wyn Davies =

Welsh footballer (1942–2025)

- L to R: Bobby Charlton, Wyn Davies, Denis Law and George Best in training jerseys 1972

Personal information
- Full name: Ronald Wyn Davies
- Date of birth: 20 March 1942
- Place of birth: Caernarfon, Gwynedd, Wales
- Date of death: 17 July 2025 (aged 83)
- Height: 6 ft 2 in (1.88 m)
- Position: Forward

Senior career*
Years	Team	Apps	(Gls)
?–1959	Locomotive Llanberis		
1959–1960	Caernarfon Town		
1960–1962	Wrexham	55	(21)
1962–1966	Bolton Wanderers	155	(66)
1966–1971	Newcastle United	181	(40)
1971–1972	Manchester City	45	(8)
1972–1973	Manchester United	16	(4)
1973–1975	Blackpool	36	(5)
1975	→ Crystal Palace (loan)	3	(0)
1975–1976	Stockport County	30	(7)
1976–1978	Crewe Alexandra	55	(15)
1978–1979	Bangor City	4	(0)
1979	Cape Town City		
Total		611	(179)

International career
1963–1973	Wales	34	(7)
- * Club domestic league appearances and goals

Ronald Wyn Davies (20 March 1942 – 17 July 2025) was a Welsh professional footballer who made over 550 Football League appearances in the 1960s and 1970s, and who was also capped by Wales.

== Club career ==
Although he began his career with Wrexham, followed by a successful few seasons for Bolton Wanderers, Davies (nicknamed Wyn the Leap) was perhaps best known for playing for Newcastle United between 1966 and 1971. He was notably part of their Inter-Cities Fairs Cup-winning team of 1969. He later played for Manchester City, signing prior to the 1971–72 season for £60,000, playing as City won the 1972 FA Charity Shield. He then moved from Maine Road to Old Trafford when he was signed by Manchester United manager, Frank O'Farrell on 14 September 1972. He was partnered with another O'Farrell signing, Ted MacDougall. Davies made his league debut for United on 23 September 1972 against champions Derby County at Old Trafford. He scored the opening goal for United in a 3–0 win.

Blackpool signed Davies for £14,000 on 14 June 1973, and he made his debut for the club on 25 August in a 2–2 draw against West Bromwich Albion, the opening League game of the season.

On 30 June 1975, Blackpool granted him a free transfer and he joined Stockport County. He also played for Crewe Alexandra, Bangor City before finishing his career with Cape Town City in South Africa.

== International career ==
In total, Davies earned 34 caps and scored seven goals for Wales. He made his Wales debut on 12 October 1963 at Ninian Park, Cardiff in the Home Championship in a 4–0 defeat by England. On 3 October 1964, Davies scored his first international goal, in a 3–2 win against Scotland again at Ninian Park and in the Home Championship. His last appearance came against Poland on 26 September 1973, a 3–0 defeat at the Stadion Śląski in Chorzów, Poland in a 1974 World Cup qualifying game.

== Personal life and death ==
Davies was born in Caernarfon, Gwynedd, Wales on 20 March 1942. Following his retirement, Davies worked as a baker in Bolton. Davies died on 17 July 2025, at the age of 83.

== Bibliography ==
- Barnes, Justyn; Bostock, Adam; Butler, Cliff; Ferguson, Jim; Meek, David; Mitten, Andy; Pilger, Sam; Taylor, Frank; Tyrrell, Tom (2001). The Official Manchester United Illustrated Encyclopedia. London: Manchester United Books. ISBN 0-233-99964-7.
