= 1969–70 Manchester City F.C. season =

English football club season

Manchester City
1969–70 season
- Chairman: Albert Alexander
- Manager: Joe Mercer
- Stadium: Maine Road
- First Division: 10th
- FA Cup: Fourth round
- League Cup: Winners
- Charity Shield: Runner-up
- Cup Winners' Cup: Winners
- Top goalscorer: League: All: Colin Bell/Francis Lee (22)
- Highest home attendance: 63,013 vs Manchester United
- Lowest home attendance: 22,073 vs Burnley
- Average home league attendance: 33,930 (10th highest in league)

The 1969–70 season was Manchester City's fourth consecutive season in the top tier of English football. The season marked a significant one as the club won its first double, which included its maiden League Cup and European trophy, being the European Cup Winners' Cup. They also became the first English side to complete a major domestic and European double. The club would not win another European trophy until 53 years later, in the 2023 UEFA Champions League Final.

The League Cup victory, combined with the First Division, FA Cup and Charity Shield success of the previous two seasons meant City became the first English club to win all four major domestic trophies.

== Kit ==
Manchester City overcame a slow start to sit fourth in the table with half of the season played, but a run of only three wins from 18 games saw City slump to finish in tenth place. City's form in the cup competitions were better by far: they defeated West Bromwich Albion 2–1 in the League Cup Final and Górnik Zabrze 2–1 in the European Cup Winners' Cup Final to become the first English team to win both a (UEFA-sponsored) European and a domestic cup in the same season.

== Squad ==
Note: Flags indicate national team as defined under FIFA eligibility rules; some limited exceptions apply. Players may hold more than one non-FIFA nationality.

Pos.	Nation	Player
GK	ENG	Joe Corrigan
GK	ENG	Harry Dowd
DF	ENG	Tony Book
DF	ENG	Tommy Booth
DF	ENG	Derek Jeffries
DF	ENG	Mike Doyle
DF	ENG	George Heslop
DF	ENG	Glyn Pardoe
DF	SCO	Willie Donachie

Pos.	Nation	Player
MF	ENG	Colin Bell
MF	ENG	Ian Bowyer
MF	ENG	Alan Oakes
MF	ENG	Tony Towers
FW	ENG	Stan Bowles
FW	ENG	Francis Lee
FW	ENG	Mike Summerbee
FW	ENG	Neil Young
FW	ENG	Frank Carrodus

=== Left club during season ===
Note: Flags indicate national team as defined under FIFA eligibility rules; some limited exceptions apply. Players may hold more than one non-FIFA nationality.

Pos.	Nation	Player
GK	ENG	Harry Dowd (on loan to Stoke City)

== Results ==
=== First Division ===
Pos	Team	Pld	W	D	L	GF	GA	GAv	Pts	Qualification or relegation
8	Manchester United	42	14	17	11	66	61	1.082	45	Qualification for the Watney Cup (Note: Derby County and Manchester United qualified for the Watney Cup as the two teams with the most goals that hadn't already qualified for a European competition.)
9	Stoke City	42	15	15	12	56	52	1.077	45	
10	Manchester City	42	16	11	15	55	48	1.146	43	Qualification for the Cup Winners' Cup first round (Note: Manchester City qualified for the Cup Winners' Cup first round as the 1969–70 European Cup Winners' Cup winners.)
11	Tottenham Hotspur	42	17	9	16	54	55	0.982	43	
12	Arsenal	42	12	18	12	51	49	1.041	42	Qualification for the Inter-Cities Fairs Cup first round

Source: World Football
Rules for classification: 1) Points; 2) Goal average; 3) Goals scored

=== Results summary ===
Overall								Home						Away					
Pld	W	D	L	GF	GA	GAv	Pts	W	D	L	GF	GA	Pts	W	D	L	GF	GA	Pts
42	16	11	15	55	48	1.146	43	8	6	7	25	22	22	8	5	8	30	26	21

=== Matches ===
Date	Opponents	H / A	Venue	Result F–A	Scorers	Attendance
9 August 1969	Sheffield Wednesday	H	Maine Road	4 - 1	Young (2), Bell, Lee	32,583
12 August 1969	Liverpool	A	Anfield	2 - 3	Bowyer, (og)	51,959
16 August 1969	Newcastle United	A	St James’ Park	0 - 1		46,850
20 August 1969	Liverpool	H	Maine Road	0 - 2		47,888
23 August 1969	Everton	H	Maine Road	1 - 1	Bowyer	43,676
27 August 1969	Sunderland	A	Roker Park	4 - 0	Oakes, Bell, Bowyer (2)	21,515
30 August 1969	Burnley	A	Turf Moor	1 - 1	Bowyer	26,341
6 September 1969	Chelsea	H	Maine Road	0 - 0		35,995
13 September 1969	Tottenham Hotspur	A	White Hart Lane	3 - 0	Bowyer 45’, Bell 88’, Oakes 90+1’	41,644
20 September 1969	Coventry City	H	Maine Road	3 - 1	Bell 2’, 88’, Lee 32’ pen	34,320
27 September 1969	Stoke City	A	Victoria Ground	0 - 2		29,739
4 October 1969	West Bromwich Albion	H	Maine Road	2 - 1	Young 44’, Bell 81’	34,329
8 October 1969	Newcastle United	H	Maine Road	2 - 1	Young 33’, Lee 90+2’ (pen)	32,172
11 October 1969	Nottingham Forest	A	City Ground	2 - 2	Lee 79’, 85’	30,037
18 October 1969	Derby County	A	Baseball Ground	1 - 0	Lee 67’	40,788
25 October 1969	Wolverhampton Wanderers	H	Maine Road	1 - 0	Doyle 48’ (pen)	34,425
1 November 1969	Ipswich Town	A	Portman Road	1 - 1	Lee 67’	24,124
8 November 1969	Southampton	H	Maine Road	1 - 0	Bell 13’	27,069
15 November 1969	Manchester United	H	Maine Road	4 - 0	Young 38’, Bell 55’, 86’, Sadler 57’ (og)	63,013
22 November 1969	Arsenal	A	Highbury	1 - 1	Bowyer 43’	42,939
29 November 1969	Leeds United	H	Maine Road	1 - 2	Lee 58’ (pen)	44,590
6 December 1969	West Ham United	H	Boleyn Ground	4 - 0	Lee 30’, Bowyer 63’, 73’, Doyle 88’	27,440
13 December 1969	Tottenham Hotspur	H	Maine Road	1- 1	Oakes 78’	29,126
20 December 1969	Chelsea	A	Stamford Bridge	1 - 3	Summerbee 87’	34,791
23 December 1969	Everton	A	Goodison Park	0 - 1		51,864
6 January 1970	Burnley	H	Maine Road	1 - 1	Lee 43’	22,074
10 January 1970	Coventry City	A	Highfield Road	0 - 3		29,386
17 January 1970	Stoke City	H	Maine Road	0 - 1		31,965
31 January 1970	West Bromwich Albion	A	The Hawthorns	0 - 3		30,722
7 February 1970	Nottingham Forest	H	Maine Road	1 - 1	Doyle 15’	27,077
18 February 1970	Arsenal	H	Maine Road	1 - 1	Bowyer 40’	43,027
21 February 1970	Wolverhampton Wanderers	A	Molineux Stadium	3 - 1	Summerbee (2), Bell	30,373
28 February 1970	Ipswich Town	H	Maine Road	1 - 0	Lee 22’ (pen)	29,376
11 March 1970	Crystal Palace	H	Maine Road	0 - 1		25,381
21 March 1970	West Ham United	H	Maine Road	1 - 5	Lee 13’	28,353
27 March 1970	Derby County	H	Maine Road	0 - 1		42,316
28 March 1970	Manchester United	A	Old Trafford	2 - 1	Lee 10’ (pen), Doyle 24’	60,286
4 April 1970	Sunderland	H	Maine Road	0 - 1		22,000
6 April 1970	Crystal Palace	A	Selhurst Park	0 - 1		27,704
8 April 1970	Southampton	A	The Dell	0 - 0		24,384
18 April 1970	Leeds United	A	Elland Road	3 - 1	Young 34’, Bell 50’, Towers 52’	22,932
22 April 1970	Sheffield Wednesday	A	Hillsborough Stadium	2 - 1	Bowyer 31’, 85’	45,258

=== FA Cup ===
Third Round

3 January 1970 Third round	Hull City	0-1	Manchester City	Hull
			Young 70'	Stadium: Boothferry Park; Attendance: 30,271; Referee: R Kirkpatrick

Fourth Round

24 January 1970 Fourth round	Manchester United	3-0	Manchester City	Trafford
	Morgan 45' (pen.); Kidd 47', 65'			Stadium: Old Trafford; Attendance: 30,271; Referee: R Kirkpatrick

=== Football League Cup ===
3 September 1969 Second round	Southport	0-3	Manchester City	Southport
			Lee 5'; Oakes 63'; Bell 83'	Stadium: Haig Avenue; Attendance: 11,215; Referee: Vic James

24 September 1969 Third round	Manchester City	3-2	Liverpool	Manchester
	Doyle 11'; Young 51'; Bowyer 66'		Evans 21'; Graham 67'	Stadium: Maine Road; Attendance: 38,019; Referee: Eric Jennings

15 October 1969 Fourth round	Manchester City	2-0	Everton	Manchester
	Bell 5'; Lee (pen.)			Stadium: Maine Road; Attendance: 45,641; Referee: R Tinder

29 October 1969 Fifth round	Manchester City	3-0	Queens Park Rangers	Manchester
	Bell 7', 9'; Summerbee 25'			Stadium: Maine Road; Attendance: 42,058; Referee: M Fussey

=== Semi Final ===
3 December 1969 Semi Final 1st leg	Manchester City	2-1	Manchester United	Manchester
	Bell 13'; Lee 88' (pen.)		Charlton 66'	Stadium: Maine Road; Attendance: 55,799; Referee: Jack Taylor

17 December 1969 Semi Final 2nd leg	Manchester United	2-2	Manchester City	Manchester
	Edwards 23'; Law 59' (pen.)		Bowyer 17'; Summerbee 82'	Stadium: Old Trafford; Attendance: 63,418; Referee: Jim Finney

=== Final ===
7 March 1970 Final	Manchester City	2-1	West Bromwich Albion	Wembley
	Doyle 58'; Pardoe 102'		Astle 6'	Stadium: Wembley Stadium; Attendance: 97,963; Referee: Vincent James

=== Charity Shield ===
3 August 1969 Charity Shield	Leeds United	2-1	Manchester City	Leeds
	Gray 55'; Charlton 58'		Bell 90'	Stadium: Elland Road; Attendance: 39,835; Referee: Ken Burns

=== European Cup Winners' Cup ===
First Round

17 September 1969 First Round 1st leg	Atletico Bilbao (Spain)	3-3	Manchester City	Bilbao
	Argoitia 9'; Clemente 12'; Uriarte 57'		Young 42'; Booth 68'; Echeberria 86' (o.g.)	Stadium: San Mamés Stadium; Attendance: 45,000; Referee: Ferdinand Marschall

1 October 1969 First Round 2nd leg	Manchester City	3-0	Atletico Bilbao (Spain)	Manchester
	Oakes 57'; Bell 67'; Bowyer 85'			Stadium: Maine Road; Attendance: 49,664; Referee: I Zsolt

Second Round

12 November 1969 Second Round 1st leg	Lierse S.K (Belgium)	0-3	Manchester City	Lier
			Lee 7', 45'; Bell 44'	Stadium: Herman Vanderpoortenstadion; Attendance: 19,000; Referee: I Zsolt

26 November 1969 Second Round 1st leg	Manchester City	5-0	Lierse S.K (Belgium)	Manchester
	Summerbee 22'; Lee 48', 55'; Bell 60', 71'			Stadium: Maine Road; Attendance: 26,486; Referee: Rudolph Gloekner

Quarter Final

4 March 1970 Quarter Final 1st leg	Académica de Coimbra (Portugal)	0-0	Manchester City	Coimbra
				Stadium: Estádio Cidade de Coimbra; Attendance: 8,206; Referee: Robert Schaut

18 March 1970 Quarter Final 2nd leg	Manchester City	1-0	Academica de Coimbra (Portugal)	Manchester
	Towers 119'			Stadium: Maine Road; Attendance: 36,338; Referee: I Roussev

Semi Final

1 April 1970 Semi Final 1st leg	Schalke 04 (Germany)	1-0	Manchester City	North Rhine-Westphalia
	Libuda 77'			Stadium: Parkstadion; Attendance: 35,000 (approx); Referee: Milivoge Gulajovic

15 April 1970 Semi Final 2nd leg	Manchester City	5-1	Schalke 04 (Germany)	Manchester
	Doyle 9'; Young 14', 27'; Lee 52'; Bell 81'		Libuda 89'	Stadium: Maine Road; Attendance: 46,361; Referee: L Van Ravens

==== Final ====
29 April 1970 Final	Manchester City	2-1	Gornik Zabrze (Poland)	Vienna
	Young 12'; Lee 43' (pen.)		Oślizło 68'	Stadium: Praterstadion; Attendance: 10,000; Referee: Paul Schiller
