= 1972–73 British Home Championship =

Tournament details
- Dates: 12–19 May 1973
- Teams: 4

Final positions
- Champions: England (48th title)
- Runners-up: Northern Ireland

Tournament statistics
- Matches played: 6
- Goals scored: 13 (2.17 per match)
- Top scorer: (England) Martin Chivers (3)

The 1972–73 British Home Championship international Home Nations football tournament was, like its predecessor in 1972, a victim of The Troubles in Northern Ireland which had erupted following Bloody Sunday the previous year. As with the previous year in the rugby union 1972 Five Nations Championship, threats were made by Republican activists against visiting British teams, which in this year meant England and Wales. To prevent violence but keep the tournament running, Northern Ireland's "home" games were transferred to Goodison Park, the home of Everton F.C. in Liverpool in England. This step meant that Ireland played just a short ferry ride from Belfast (where the match was originally scheduled) in a city with a substantial Irish population, but where the police were able to exercise a greater measure of control over who was able to attend.

The shift to England did not substantially hinder the Irish, who claimed a rare and respectable second place behind England, who achieved yet another whitewash of their near neighbours. Beating the Irish in Liverpool to match Scotland's win over Wales, England then inflicted defeat on the same team at Wembley, whilst the Irish recovered from their first game to beat the Scots in Scotland. In the final two games, Northern Ireland beat Wales, setting up a close encounter in the final game, in which a draw or win would give England the tournament. The game was a close encounter, made more interesting by an English 5–0 thrashing of Scotland two months earlier in a testimonial match celebrating one hundred years of international football. England however, eventually triumphed by a single goal from Martin Peters, winning the trophy for another year.

== Table ==
Team	Pld	W	D	L	GF	GA	GD	Pts
England (C)	3	3	0	0	6	1	+5	6
Northern Ireland	3	2	0	1	4	3	+1	4
Scotland	3	1	0	2	3	3	0	2
Wales	3	0	0	3	0	6	−6	0

Rules for classification: 1) points. The points system worked as follows: 2 points for a win and 1 point for a draw.
(C) Champions

== Results ==
12 May 1973

Wales	0–2	Scotland
		Graham 60', 70'

Racecourse Ground, Wrexham
Attendance: 18,682
Referee: James Lawther (Northern Ireland)

12 May 1973

Northern Ireland	1–2	England
Clements 22' (pen.)		Chivers 9', 82'

Goodison Park, Liverpool
Attendance: 29,865
Referee: Clive Thomas (Wales)

15 May 1973

England	3–0	Wales
Chivers 24'; Channon 32'; Peters 75'

Wembley Stadium, London
Attendance: 38,000
Referee: John Patterson (Scotland)

16 May 1973

Scotland	1–2	Northern Ireland
Dalglish 89'		O'Neill 3'; Anderson 16'

Hampden Park, Glasgow
Attendance: 39,018
Referee: Ken Burns (England)

19 May 1973

Northern Ireland	1–0	Wales
Hamilton 14'

Goodison Park, Liverpool
Attendance: 4,946
Referee: Bobby Davidson (Scotland)

19 May 1973

England	1–0	Scotland
Peters 54'

Wembley Stadium, London
Attendance: 95,950
Referee: Kurt Tschenscher (West Germany)
