= Francis Lee (footballer) =

English footballer (1944–2023)

Francis Lee CBE
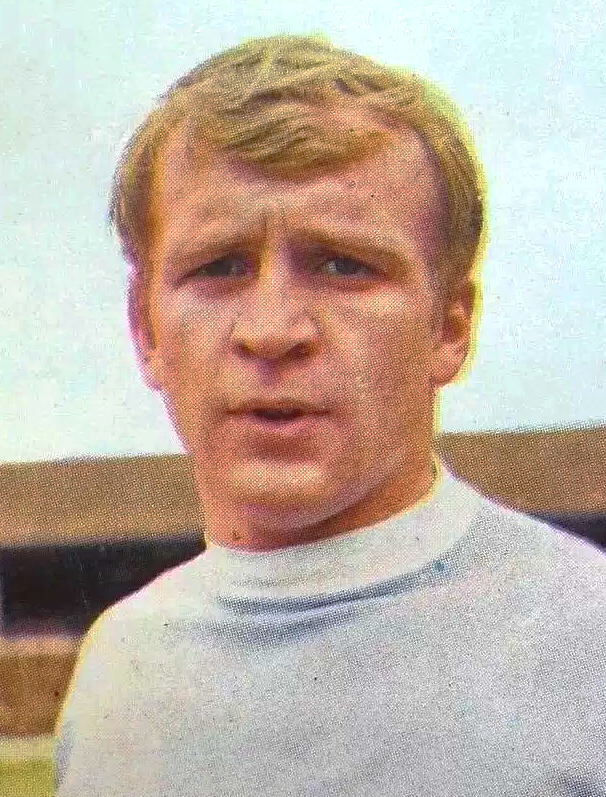
- Lee with Manchester City, c. 1970

Personal information
- Full name: Francis Henry Lee
- Date of birth: 29 April 1944
- Place of birth: Westhoughton, Lancashire, England
- Date of death: 2 October 2023 (aged 79)
- Place of death: Cheshire East, England
- Height: 5 ft 8 in (1.73 m)
- Position: Striker

Senior career*
Years	Team	Apps	(Gls)
1959–1967	Bolton Wanderers	189	(92)
1967–1974	Manchester City	249	(112)
1974–1976	Derby County	62	(24)
Total		500	(228)

International career
1968–1972	England	27	(10)
- * Club domestic league appearances and goals

Francis Henry Lee CBE (29 April 1944 – 2 October 2023), also known as Franny Lee, was an English professional footballer and businessman. He was also later the chairman and main shareholder of Manchester City, as well as briefly a racehorse trainer and amateur cricket player.

A striker, he played for Bolton Wanderers, Manchester City, Derby County and the England national team. Noted for his speed and determination, he scored more than 200 goals in his career, in which he won League Championship medals with Manchester City and Derby. In 2010, he was inducted into the English Football Hall of Fame.

Lee holds the English record for the greatest number of penalties scored in a season, a feat that earned him the nickname "Lee 1 (Pen)", because that was the way his name often seemed to appear on the list of goal scorers for City in the match results listings of the Sunday papers. This led to accusations of diving. One such accusation, by Leeds United's Norman Hunter, led to an on-pitch fight.

In 1966, Lee founded F. H. Lee Ltd, a firm that recycled paper to manufacture products such as kitchen roll and toilet paper. It operated until 2003 and made him a millionaire. In 1994, Lee became the major shareholder and chairman of Manchester City, but stepped down four years later.

== Club career ==
=== Bolton Wanderers ===
As a 16-year-old amateur footballer, Lee made his debut for Bolton Wanderers in November 1960 against Manchester City at Burnden Park. Playing in attack alongside club legend Nat Lofthouse, then 35-years old, both scored in a 3–1 win. He signed professionally in May 1961 and was Bolton's top scorer in the 1962–63 season in the First Division. The following season, Bolton were relegated to the Second Division and their second tier campaign, in the 1964–65 season, was Lee's most prolific for the club, scoring 23 league goals. He scored in seven consecutive games at the start of the 1967–68 season and in September 1967, he was transferred to Manchester City, having scored 106 goals in 210 appearances for Bolton.

=== Manchester City ===
Manchester City manager Joe Mercer signed him for a club record transfer fee of £60,000 in 1967. Mercer described the purchase of Lee for City as "the final piece of the puzzle". He made his Manchester City debut in a 2–0 win over Wolverhampton Wanderers at Maine Road, and scored his first goal for City the following week at Fulham. In his first season at the club, he scored 16 League goals in 31 appearances, playing a crucial role in City's push for the league title; Mercer described him as "the final piece of the jigsaw". The title was decided on the final day of the season, City requiring a win at Newcastle United. City won the match 4–3, with Lee scoring one of the goals, and were crowned champions. The following season, Lee was part of the Manchester City team that won the 1969 FA Cup.

In the 1969–70 season, Lee was City's top scorer, an achievement he would subsequently match in each of the next four seasons. His tally that season included one of the most important goals of his career, a penalty in the final of the European Cup Winners' Cup.

In the 1971–72 season, Lee set a British record for the number of penalties scored in a season, with 15 of his 35 goals scored from the penalty spot – seven of the penalties resulted from fouls on Lee, earning him the nickname "Lee 1 (Pen)". Some journalists, holding the opinion that Lee gained a number of penalties by diving, used the name "Lee Won Pen" instead. Lee's name is often cited in debates about diving in football; referees' chief Keith Hackett described him as a player who "had a reputation of falling down easily".

Lee also held the record for the most goals in Manchester derbies, scoring ten goals in all against Manchester United, a tally that equalled Joe Hayes' record. This record was later beaten by Wayne Rooney, who scored his 11th goal in the fixture on 22 September 2013.

=== Derby County ===
Lee left Manchester City in 1974, joining Derby County. For the second time in his career, Lee joined a team viewed as contenders for that season's league title. He was upset at Manchester City's decision to sell him and marked his first match against his former club by scoring the winning goal for Derby. Lee scored twelve league goals that season, Derby winning their second league title and Lee the second championship medal of his career. On 1 November 1975, Lee had a confrontation with Leeds United defender Norman Hunter, which gained a level of infamy after it was screened on Match of the Day. In the first half of the game, the referee adjudged that Hunter had fouled Lee in the Leeds penalty area, and awarded Derby a penalty. Charlie George, and not Lee, took the penalty kick, and scored. In the second half, Lee and Hunter were seen to be exchanging punches in an off-the-ball incident. The referee stopped the game and took both players' names, but it was not immediately clear if he had sent off either or both of them. However, as the two men walked away they began fighting again. After intervention by both sets of players, Hunter left the pitch and Lee was restrained and ushered off the field by a club official. Lee suffered a cut lip following the fight which required four stitches and was subsequently banned for four weeks. In 2003, the incident was named by The Observer as sport's most spectacular dismissal.

Lee played two seasons at Derby, making 80 appearances and scoring 30 goals. On 24 April 1976, the final day of the 1975–76 season, he played his last game as a professional footballer in a 6–2 win at against Ipswich Town, in which he scored two goals.

== International career ==
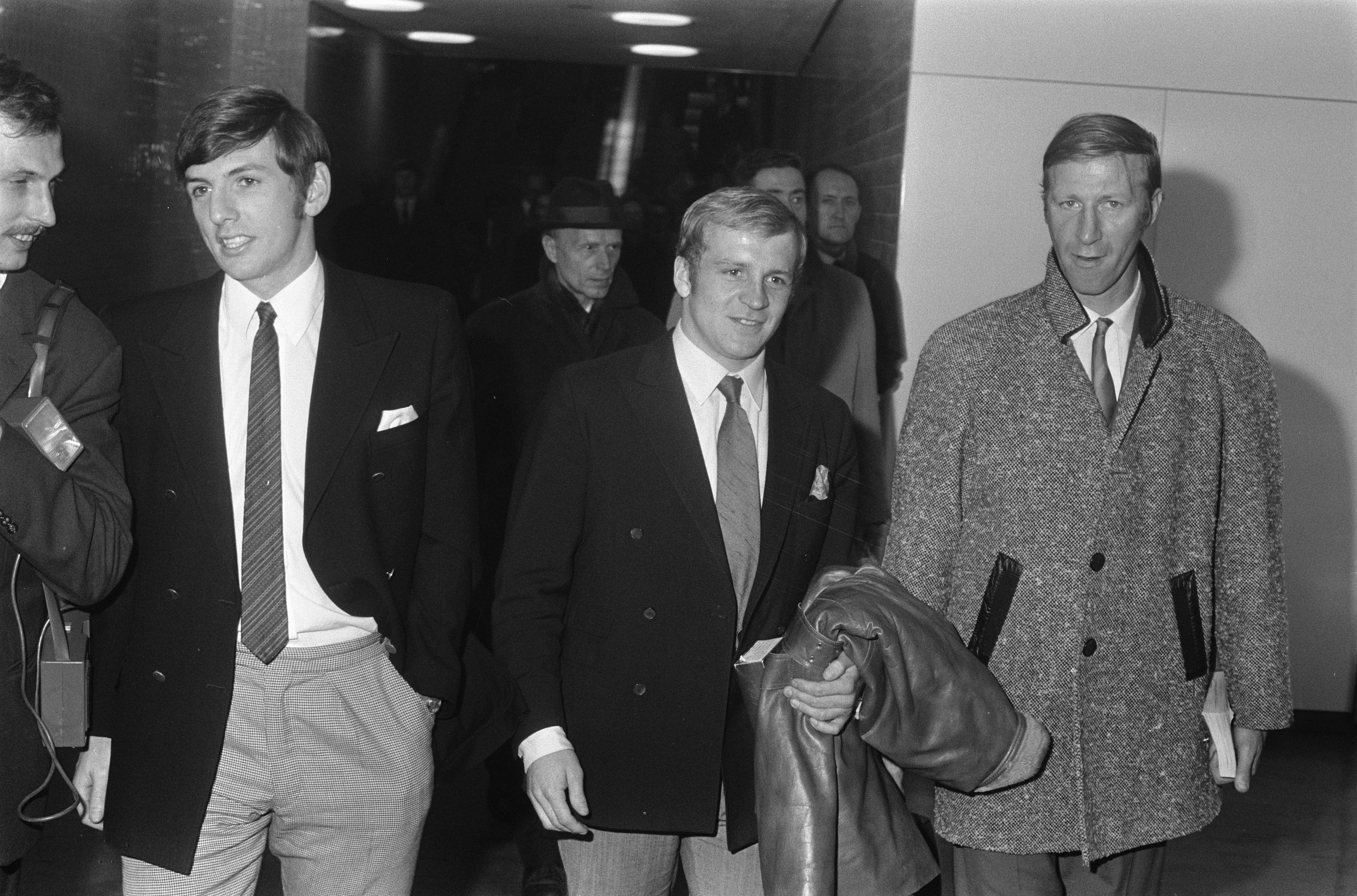
Lee (centre) alongside Martin Peters (left) and Jack Charlton (right) at Schiphol Airport, 1969

Lee made his debut for England, aged 24 on 11 December 1968 in a friendly game against Bulgaria at Wembley Stadium. His first goal came in his next game, a 5–0 win, again in a friendly, against France on 12 March 1969. The same year, Lee played on a "Rest of the UK" team in a match against Wales to mark the investiture of the Prince of Wales. Lee played the first half of the match and scored what turned out to be the winning goal in the 33rd minute.

Lee represented England at the 1970 FIFA World Cup in Mexico and was the first English player ever to receive a card in a World Cup, for kicking Brazil's goalkeeper, Félix. He played in the World Cup games against Romania, Brazil as well as the game in which England were eliminated, a 3–2 defeat by West Germany at the Estadio de Guanajuato in León.

== Business career ==
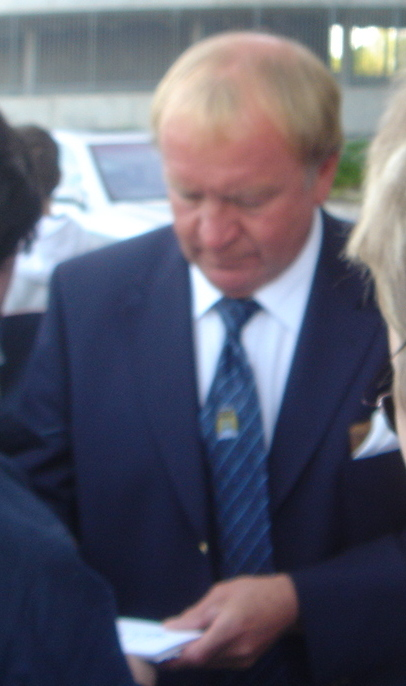
Lee signing an autograph

After his playing career, Lee moved into business. His toilet roll manufacturing business FH Lee Ltd once employed Peter Kay, later a famous comedian, who mentions his time there in his autobiography, The Sound of Laughter.

In 1994, Lee became chairman of Manchester City, ousting Peter Swales from the position by purchasing £3 million of shares at a price of £13.35 per share. Lee was welcomed as a hero by City's supporters, who had formed a movement named Forward With Franny backing his attempt to gain control of the club. Upon becoming chairman, Lee made a series of extravagant claims about his plans for the club, announcing that "This will be the happiest club in the land. The players will be the best paid and we'll drink plenty of champagne, celebrate and sing until we're hoarse". In 1995, he appointed his friend Alan Ball as manager, but the appointment proved unsuccessful and the club were relegated. Lee stepped down in 1998, with the club on the brink of relegation to the third tier of English football, a fate that Lee had dismissed at the previous annual general meeting by saying that he would "jump off the Kippax" if the club were relegated. He was succeeded by David Bernstein. Lee retained a shareholding after leaving the board of directors but later sold all his shares to Thaksin Shinawatra in 2007.

In addition to his business ventures, Lee also had a career as a racehorse trainer. Notable horses trained by Lee include Sir Harry Hardman, Allwight Then and Young Jason. Lee gave the trade up in 1996 to pursue his business commitments. In a training career which ran from 1984 to 1996, he trained the winners of 181 races in Britain and Ireland. Jockey Willie Carson said ""He was quite a good trainer and had a proper team of horses at one point."

== Personal life ==
Before becoming a professional footballer Lee showed promise at cricket, representing the Horwich and Westhoughton Schools FA Team in 1958. When his football career came to an end, he briefly returned to cricket, playing for Westhoughton's first XI in 1977 as a medium-fast bowler and middle to lower order batsman.

Lee was appointed Commander of the Order of the British Empire (CBE) in the 2016 New Year Honours for services to football and charity.

On 2 October 2023, Lee died after a long illness with cancer. He was 79.

== Career statistics ==
=== International ===
Appearances and goals by national team and year
National team	Year	Apps	Goals
England
England	1968	1	0
England	1969	8	4
England	1970	9	3
England	1971	8	2
England	1972	1	1
Total		27	10

Scores and results list England's goal tally first, score column indicates score after each Lee goal.

List of international goals scored by Francis Lee
No.	Date	Venue	Opponent	Score	Result	Competition
1	12 March 1969	Wembley Stadium, London, England	France	4–0	5–0	Friendly
2	3 May 1969	Windsor Park, Belfast, Northern Ireland	Northern Ireland	2–1	3–1	British Home Championship
3	7 May 1969	Wembley Stadium, London, England	Wales	2–1	2–1	British Home Championship
4	8 June 1969	Estadio Centenario, Montevideo, Uruguay	Uruguay	1–1	2–1	Friendly
5	18 April 1970	Ninian Park, Cardiff, Wales	Wales	1–1	1–1	British Home Championship
6	24 May 1970	Estadio Olímpico Atahualpa, Quito, Ecuador	Ecuador	1–0	2–0	Friendly
7	25 November 1970	Wembley Stadium, London, England	East Germany	1–0	3–1	Friendly
8	21 April 1971	Wembley Stadium, London, England	Greece	3–0	3–0	UEFA Euro 1972 qualification
9	12 May 1971	Wembley Stadium, London, England	Malta	2–0	5–0	UEFA Euro 1972 qualification
10	29 April 1972	Wembley Stadium, London, England	West Germany	1–1	1–3	UEFA Euro 1972 quarter-finals

== Honours ==
Manchester City

- Football League First Division: 1967–68
- FA Cup: 1968–69
- Football League Cup: 1969–70; runner-up: 1973–74
- FA Charity Shield: 1968, 1972
- European Cup Winners' Cup: 1969–70

Derby County

- Football League First Division: 1974–75
- FA Charity Shield: 1975

Individual

- Manchester City Player of the Year: 1969–70
- English Football Hall of Fame
- Manchester City top goalscorer: 1968–69, 1969–70 (shared), 1970–71 (shared), 1971–72, 1973–74
