= 1966–67 Manchester City F.C. season =

English football club season

Manchester City
1966–67 season
- Manager: Joe Mercer
- Stadium: Maine Road
- First Division: 15th
- FA Cup: Sixth round
- League Cup: Third round
- Top goalscorer: League: Colin Bell (12); All: Colin Bell (14)
- Highest home attendance: 62,983 vs Manchester United (21 January 1967)
- Lowest home attendance: 20,104 vs Southampton (17 December 1966)
- Average home league attendance: 31,208 (11th highest in league)

The 1966–67 season was Manchester City's 65th season in existence and 47th season in the top division of English football. In addition to the First Division, the club competed in the FA Cup and the Football League Cup.

== First Division ==
=== League table ===
Pos	Team	Pld	W	D	L	GF	GA	GAv	Pts
13	West Bromwich Albion	42	16	7	19	77	73	1.055	39
14	Burnley	42	15	9	18	66	76	0.868	39
15	Manchester City	42	12	15	15	43	52	0.827	39
16	West Ham United	42	14	8	20	80	84	0.952	36
17	Sunderland	42	14	8	20	58	72	0.806	36

Source: World Football
Rules for classification: 1) Points; 2) Goal average; 3) Goals scored

=== Results summary ===
Overall								Home						Away					
Pld	W	D	L	GF	GA	GAv	Pts	W	D	L	GF	GA	Pts	W	D	L	GF	GA	Pts
42	12	15	15	43	52	0.827	39	8	9	4	27	25	25	4	6	11	16	27	14

=== Matches ===
Date	Opponents	H / A	Venue	Result F–A	Scorers	Attendance
20 August 1966	Southampton	A	The Dell	1–1	Summerbee	19,900
24 August 1966	Liverpool	H	Maine Road	2–1	Murray, Bell	50,923
27 August 1966	Sunderland	H	Maine Road	1–0	Oakes	34,948
30 August 1966	Liverpool	A	Anfield	2–3	Gray, Murray	51,645
3 September 1966	Aston Villa	A	Villa Park	0–3		15,118
7 September 1966	West Ham United	H	Maine Road	1–4	Bell	31,079
10 September 1966	Arsenal	H	Maine Road	1–1	Pardoe	27,948
17 September 1966	Manchester United	A	Old Trafford	0–1		62,085
24 September 1966	Blackpool	A	Bloomfield Road	1–0	Crossan	25,761
1 October 1966	Chelsea	H	Maine Road	1–4	Young	31,989
8 October 1966	Tottenham Hotspur	H	Maine Road	1–2	Summerbee	32,551
15 October 1966	Newcastle United	A	St James’ Park	0–2		16,510
29 October 1966	Burnley	A	Turf Moor	3–2	Crossan (2), Bell	25,996
5 November 1966	Newcastle United	H	Maine Road	1–1	Young	26,137
12 November 1966	Stoke City	A	Victoria Ground	1–0	Summerbee	27,803
19 November 1966	Everton	H	Maine Road	1–0	Bell	39,572
26 November 1966	Fulham	A	Craven Cottage	1–4	Young	14,579
3 December 1966	Nottingham Forest	H	Maine Road	1–1	Kennedy	24,013
10 December 1966	West Bromwich Albion	A	The Hawthorns	3–0	Pardoe, Jones, Crossan	16,908
17 December 1966	Southampton	H	Maine Road	1–1	Bell	20,104
27 December 1966	Sheffield Wednesday	A	Hillsborough	0–1		34,005
31 December 1966	Sunderland	A	Roker Park	0–1		28,826
2 January 1967	Sheffield Wednesday	H	Maine Road	0–0		32,198
14 January 1967	Arsenal	A	Highbury	0–1		22,392
21 January 1967	Manchester United	H	Maine Road	1–1	Stiles (og)	62,983
4 February 1967	Blackpool	H	Maine Road	1–0	Bell	27,840
11 February 1967	Chelsea	A	Stamford Bridge	0–0		28,633
25 February 1967	Tottenham Hotspur	A	White Hart Lane	1–1	Connor	33,822
4 March 1967	Burnley	H	Maine Road	1–0	Bell	32,692
18 March 1967	Leeds United	A	Elland Road	0–0		34,366
24 March 1967	Leicester City	H	Maine Road	1–3	Crossan (pen)	35,396
25 March 1967	West Bromwich Albion	H	Maine Road	2–2	Hince (2)	22,780
28 March 1967	Leicester City	A	Elland Road	1–2	Jones	17,361
1 April 1967	Sheffield United	A	Bramhall Lane	0–1		16,976
12 April 1967	Stoke City	H	Maine Road	3–1	Bell (3)	25,753
19 April 1967	Aston Villa	H	Maine Road	1–1	Summerbee	21,817
22 April 1967	Fulham	H	Maine Road	3–0	Oakes, Crossan, Bell	22,752
29 April 1967	Everton	A	Goodison Park	1–1	Coleman	33,239
2 May 1967	Nottingham Forest	A	City Ground	0–2		32,000
6 May 1967	Sheffield United	H	Maine Road	1–1	Crossan	21,267
8 May 1967	Leeds United	H	Maine Road	2–1	Crossan, Young	24,316
13 May 1967	West Ham United	A	Boleyn Ground	1–1	Bell	17,186

== FA Cup ==
=== Results ===
Date	Round	Opponents	H / A	Venue	Result F–A	Scorers	Attendance
28 January 1967	3rd Round	Leicester City	H	Maine Road	2–1	Pardoe, Doyle	38,529
18 February 1967	4th Round	Cardiff City	A	Ninian Park	1–1	Coldrick (og)	37,205
22 February 1967	4th Round Replay	Cardiff City	H	Maine Road	3–1	Young, Crossan (pen), Bell	41,616
11 March 1967	5th Round	Ipswich Town	H	Maine Road	1–1	Young	37,076
14 March 1967	5th Round Replay	Ipswich Town	A	Portman Road	3–0	Summerbee (2), McNeil (og)	30,605
8 April 1967	6th Round	Leeds United	A	Elland Road	0–1		48,887

== Football League Cup ==
=== Results ===
Date	Round	Opponents	H / A	Venue	Result F–A	Scorers	Attendance
14 September 1966	2nd Round	Bolton Wanderers	H	Maine Road	3–1	Murray, Pardoe, Bell	9,006
5 October 1966	3rd Round	West Bromwich Albion	A	The Hawthorns	2–4	Young, Summerbee	18,000
