= 1971–72 British Home Championship =

Tournament details
- Dates: 20–27 May 1972
- Teams: 4

Final positions
- Champions: England (47th title); Scotland (38th title)

Tournament statistics
- Matches played: 6
- Goals scored: 8 (1.33 per match)
- Top scorer: (Scotland) Peter Lorimer (2)

The 1971–72 British Home Championship was the first such Home Nations football tournament (although not the last), to suffer during The Troubles in Northern Ireland, when death threats from the Provisional Irish Republican Army were sent to the Scottish Football Association and Scottish players who were scheduled to play at Windsor Park. The surge in anti-British feeling which prompted these threats followed Bloody Sunday in January, and also resulted in the cancellation of the rugby union 1972 Five Nations Championship. As a result, Northern Ireland's home fixture was rescheduled to Hampden Park, effectively granting the Scottish team an extra home match. This was not the last time that The Troubles would interfere with the Home Championship; the 1981 British Home Championship would have to be abandoned following similar heightened tension after the death of Bobby Sands.

Scotland used their home advantage well, securing victory over the Irish and Welsh to take a major points advantage into the final match against England, who had lost at home to Northern Ireland following a heavy defeat of Wales. In the last match however, England gained a slight advantage over their old rivals, winning 1–0 and thus equalling the tournament on points and resulting in a shared victory (goal difference was not at this stage used to differentiate between teams). The Welsh salvaged a point in their final home game to Northern Ireland, but still finished bottom of the table.

== Table ==
Team	Pld	W	D	L	GF	GA	GD	Pts
England (C)	3	2	0	1	4	1	+3	4
Scotland (C)	3	2	0	1	3	1	+2	4
Northern Ireland	3	1	1	1	1	2	−1	3
Wales	3	0	1	2	0	4	−4	1

Rules for classification: 1) points. The points system worked as follows: 2 points for a win and 1 point for a draw.
(C) Co-champions

== Results ==
20 May 1972

Wales	0–3	England
		Hughes 25'; Marsh 60'; Bell 61'

Ninian Park, Cardiff
Attendance: 34,000
Referee: William Mullan (Scotland)

20 May 1972

Scotland	2–0	Northern Ireland
Law 86'; Lorimer 89'

Hampden Park, Glasgow
Attendance: 39,710
Referee: Clive Thomas (Wales)

23 May 1972

England	0–1	Northern Ireland
		Neill 33'

Wembley Stadium, London
Attendance: 64,000
Referee: John Gow (Wales)

24 May 1972

Scotland	1–0	Wales
Lorimer 78'

Hampden Park, Glasgow
Attendance: 21,332
Referee: James Lawther (Northern Ireland)

27 May 1972

Wales	0–0	Northern Ireland

Racecourse Ground, Wrexham
Attendance: 15,647
Referee: Jack Taylor (England)

27 May 1972

Scotland	0–1	England
		Ball 28'

Hampden Park, Glasgow
Attendance: 119,325
Referee: Sergio Gonella (Italy)
