= 1971–72 Manchester City F.C. season =

English football club season

Manchester City
1971–72 season
- Manager: Joe Mercer (to 7 October 1971); Malcolm Allison (from 7 October 1971)
- Stadium: Maine Road
- First Division: 4th
- FA Cup: Third Round
- League Cup: Third Round
- Texaco Cup: First Round
- Top goalscorer: League: Francis Lee(33); All: Francis Lee(35)
- Highest home attendance: 63,366 vs Manchester United; 6 November 1971
- Lowest home attendance: 25,677 vs West Bromwich Albion; 1 March 1972
- Average home league attendance: 38,559 (6th highest in league)

The 1971–72 season was Manchester City's 70th season of competitive football and 52nd season in the top division of English football. In addition to the First Division, the club competed in the FA Cup, Football League Cup, FA Charity Shield and the UEFA Cup. On 18 March, the club were 5 points clear at the top of the table with eight games to go. However, City only won 3 of their remaining 8 games, leaving them fourth by the end of the season. The signing of Rodney Marsh in March 1972 was widely blamed for the slip up, as it was suggested by former players such as Neil Young, that his style of play did not suit the team.

== First Division ==
=== League table ===
Pos	Team	Pld	W	D	L	GF	GA	GAv	Pts	Qualification or relegation
2	Leeds United	42	24	9	9	73	31	2.355	57	Qualification for the European Cup Winners' Cup first round (Note: Leeds United qualified for the European Cup Winners' Cup as the 1971-72 FA Cup winners.)
3	Liverpool	42	24	9	9	64	30	2.133	57	Qualification for the UEFA Cup first round
4	Manchester City	42	23	11	8	77	45	1.711	57	Qualification for the UEFA Cup first round
5	Arsenal	42	22	8	12	58	40	1.450	52	
6	Tottenham Hotspur	42	19	13	10	63	42	1.500	51	Qualification for the UEFA Cup first round (Note: Tottenham Hotspur qualified for the UEFA Cup as the 1971-72 UEFA Cup winners.)

Source: World Football
Rules for classification: 1) Points; 2) Goal average; 3) Goals scored

=== Results summary ===
Overall								Home						Away					
Pld	W	D	L	GF	GA	GAv	Pts	W	D	L	GF	GA	Pts	W	D	L	GF	GA	Pts
42	23	11	8	77	45	1.711	57	16	3	2	48	15	35	7	8	6	29	30	22

=== Results ===
Date	Opponents	H / A	Venue	Result F – A	Scorers	Attendance
14 August 1971	Leeds United	H	Maine Road	0 – 1		38,566
18 August 1971	Crystal Palace	H	Maine Road	4 – 0	Lee (2), Booth, Davies	27,103
21 August 1971	Chelsea	A	Stamford Bridge	2 - 2	Lee (2)	38,425
24 August 1971	Wolverhampton Wanderers	A	Molineux Stadium	1 – 2	Lee	26,663
28 August 1971	Tottenham Hotspur	H	Maine Road	4 – 0	Bell, Summerbee, Davies, Lee	36,463
1 September 1971	Liverpool	H	Maine Road	1 - 0	Mellor	45,144
4 September 1971	Leicester City	A	Filbert Street	0 – 0		25,258
11 September 1971	Newcastle United	H	Maine Road	2 – 1	Bell, Lee	32,710
18 September 1971	Nottingham Forest	A	City Ground	2 – 2	Lee, Davies	21,468
25 September 1971	Southampton	H	Maine Road	3 – 0	Lee, Bell, Davies	27,897
2 October 1971	West Bromwich Albion	A	The Hawthorns	2 – 0	Lee, Connor	25,834
9 October 1971	Everton	H	Maine Road	1 - 0	Lee	33,538
16 October 1971	Leeds United	A	Elland Road	0 – 3		36,004
23 October 1971	Sheffield United	H	Maine Road	2 – 1	Doyle, Lee	41,688
30 October 1971	Huddersfield Town	A	Leeds Road	1 – 1	Carter	20,153
6 November 1971	Manchester United	H	Maine Road	3 - 3	Lee, Bell, Summerbee	63,366
13 November 1971	Arsenal	A	Highbury	2 – 1	Mellor, Bell	47,443
20 November 1971	West Ham United	A	Boleyn Ground	0 – 0	Lee, Davies	33,694
27 November 1971	Coventry City	H	Maine Road	4 – 0	Lee (2), Bell (2)	31,003
4 December 1971	Derby County	A	Baseball Ground	1 – 3	Lee	35,354
11 December 1971	Ipswich Town	H	Maine Road	4 – 0	Davies, Mellor, Bell, Lee	26,900
18 December 1971	Leicester City	H	Maine Road	1 – 1	Lee	29,524
27 December 1971	Stoke City	A	Roker Park	3 – 1	Towers, Book, Lee	43,007
1 January 1972	Nottingham Forest	H	Maine Road	2 – 2	Lee, Davies	38,777
8 January 1972	Tottenham Hotspur	A	White Hart Lane	1 - 1	Davies	36,470
22 January 1972	Crystal Palace	A	Selhurst Park	2 – 1	Lee, Blyth	31,480
29 January 1972	Wolverhampton Wanderers	H	Maine Road	5 – 2	Booth, Lee (3), Towers	37,639
12 February 1972	Sheffield United	A	Bramhall Lane	3 – 3	Lee (2), Bell	38,184
18 February 1972	Huddersfield Town	H	Maine Road	1 – 0	Booth	36,421
26 February 1972	Liverpool	A	Anfield	0 - 3		50,074
1 March 1972	West Bromwich Albion	H	Maine Road	2 – 1	Bell (2)	25,677
4 March 1972	Arsenal	H	Maine Road	2 - 0	Lee (2)	44,213
11 March 1972	Everton	A	Goodison Park	2 – 1	Wright (og), Hill	44,646
18 March 1972	Chelsea	H	Maine Road	1 – 0	Booth	53,322
25 March 1972	Newcastle United	A	St James Park	0 – 0		37,460
1 April 1972	Stoke City	H	Maine Road	1 – 2	Lee	49,392
3 April 1972	Southampton	A	The Dell	0 – 2		27,374
8 April 1972	West Ham United	H	Maine Road	3 – 1	Marsh (2), Bell	38,491
12 April 1972	Manchester United	A	Old Trafford	3 – 1	Lee (2), Marsh	56,000
15 April 1972	Coventry City	A	Highfield Road	1 – 1	Towers	34,225
18 April 1972	Ipswich Town	A	Portman Road	1 – 2	Summerbee	24,365
22 April 1972	Derby County	H	Maine Road	2 - 0	Marsh, Lee	55,026

== FA Cup ==
=== Results ===
Date	Round	Opponents	H / A	Venue	Result F – A	Scorers	Attendance
15 January 1972	Third round	Middlesbrough	H	Maine Road	1 – 1	Lee (pen)	42,620
18 January 1972	Third round Replay	Middlesbrough	A	Ayresome Park	0 – 1		37,917

== Football League Cup ==
=== Results ===
Date	Round	Opponents	H / A	Venue	Result F – A	Scorers	Attendance
8 September 1971	Second round	Wolverhampton Wanderers	H	Maine Road	4 – 3	Davies 41'; Bell (2) 78', 84'; Lee (pen) 81'	29,156
5 October 1971	Third round	Bolton Wanderers	A	Burnden Park	0 – 3		42,039
