= 1972 FA Charity Shield =

Aston Villa	Manchester City
0	1
- Date: 5 August 1972
- Venue: Villa Park, Birmingham
- Referee: Norman Burtenshaw
- Attendance: 34,859

The 1972 FA Charity Shield was contested between Manchester City and Aston Villa.

Normally, the Charity Shield would have been contested by the First Division champions and FA Cup holders, who were Derby County and Leeds United respectively, but both declined the chance to play in the Charity Shield. Instead, Manchester City, who had finished in fourth place in the First Division; and Aston Villa, who finished as Third Division champions accepted the invitation to play.

The match was played at Villa Park and Manchester City won 1–0, following a penalty from striker Francis Lee.

== Match details ==
5 August 1972
15:00

Aston Villa	0–1	Manchester City
	Report	Lee (pen.)

Villa Park, Birmingham
Attendance: 34,859
Referee: Norman Burtenshaw

Aston Villa	Manchester City

GK	1	(England) Jim Cumbes
RB	2	(England) Mick Wright
LB	3	(Scotland) Charlie Aitken
CM	4	(Scotland) Bruce Rioch
CB	5	(Northern Ireland) Chris Nicholl
CB	6	(Scotland) Ian Ross (c)
RW	7	(England) Ray Graydon
CM	8	(Scotland) Pat McMahon
CF	9	(England) Andy Lochhead (substituted on)
CF	10	(England) Geoff Vowden
LW	11	(England) Willie Anderson
Substitute:
CB	12	(England) Alun Evans (substituted on)
Manager:
(Wales) Vic Crowe

GK	1	(England) Joe Corrigan
RB	2	(England) Tony Book (c)
LB	3	(Scotland) Willie Donachie (substituted off)
CB	4	(England) Mike Doyle
CB	5	(England) Tommy Booth
CM	6	(England) Colin Bell
CM	7	(England) Mike Summerbee
CM	8	(England) Francis Lee
CF	9	(Wales) Wyn Davies (substituted off)
LW	10	(England) Rodney Marsh
RW	11	(England) Tony Towers
Substitute:
CB	12	(England) Derek Jeffries (substituted on)
CF		(England) Ian Mellor (substituted on)
Manager:
(England) Malcolm Allison
