= 1974–75 Football League First Division =

1974–75 season of Football League First Division

Football League First Division
- Season: 1974–75
- Champions: Derby County; 2nd English title
- Relegated: Luton Town; Chelsea; Carlisle United
- European Cup: Derby County
- European Cup Winners' Cup: West Ham United
- UEFA Cup: Liverpool; Ipswich Town; Everton
- Matches: 462
- Goals: 1,213 (2.63 per match)
- Top goalscorer: Malcolm Macdonald (21 goals)
- Biggest home win: Wolverhampton Wanderers 7–1 Chelsea (15 March 1975)
- Biggest away win: Luton Town 1–4 Ipswich Town (14 September 1974); Newcastle United 2–5 Tottenham Hotspur (11 January 1975); Burnley 2–5 Derby County (31 March 1975); Birmingham City 1–4 Luton Town (19 April 1975); 0–3: 7 matches
- Highest scoring: Ipswich Town 5–4 Newcastle United (15 March 1975)

Statistics of Football League First Division in the 1974–75 season.

== Overview ==
Derby County won the First Division title for the second time in the club's history that season. They made sure of it on 19 April, with a 0-0 draw at Leicester City and the fact that their title challengers Liverpool lost 1-0 at Middlesbrough. Carlisle United were relegated on 19 April, despite winning 1-0 at home against Wolverhampton Wanderers, Tottenham Hotspur sent the Cumbrians down. Chelsea were relegated after they only drew 1-1 at home against Everton where they had to better Luton Town's result but Luton also drew 1-1 at home, against Manchester City. Luton Town went down on 28 April, after Tottenham beat Leeds United 4-2 at White Hart Lane.

== League standings ==
| Pos | Team | Pld | W | D | L | GF | GA | GAv | Pts | Qualification or relegation |
|---|---|---|---|---|---|---|---|---|---|---|
| 1 | Derby County (C) | 42 | 21 | 11 | 10 | 67 | 49 | 1.367 | 53 | Qualification for the European Cup first round |
| 2 | Liverpool | 42 | 20 | 11 | 11 | 60 | 39 | 1.538 | 51 | Qualification for the UEFA Cup first round |
| 3 | Ipswich Town | 42 | 23 | 5 | 14 | 66 | 44 | 1.500 | 51 | Qualification for the UEFA Cup first round |
| 4 | Everton | 42 | 16 | 18 | 8 | 56 | 42 | 1.333 | 50 | Qualification for the UEFA Cup first round |
| 5 | Stoke City | 42 | 17 | 15 | 10 | 64 | 48 | 1.333 | 49 | |
| 6 | Sheffield United | 42 | 18 | 13 | 11 | 58 | 51 | 1.137 | 49 | |
| 7 | Middlesbrough | 42 | 18 | 12 | 12 | 54 | 40 | 1.350 | 48 | |
| 8 | Manchester City | 42 | 18 | 10 | 14 | 54 | 54 | 1.000 | 46 | |
| 9 | Leeds United | 42 | 16 | 13 | 13 | 57 | 49 | 1.163 | 45 | |
| 10 | Burnley | 42 | 17 | 11 | 14 | 68 | 67 | 1.015 | 45 | |
| 11 | Queens Park Rangers | 42 | 16 | 10 | 16 | 54 | 54 | 1.000 | 42 | |
| 12 | Wolverhampton Wanderers | 42 | 14 | 11 | 17 | 57 | 54 | 1.056 | 39 | |
| 13 | West Ham United | 42 | 13 | 13 | 16 | 58 | 59 | 0.983 | 39 | Qualification for the European Cup Winners' Cup first round (Note: West Ham United qualified for the European Cup Winners' Cup as the 1974-75 FA Cup winners.) |
| 14 | Coventry City | 42 | 12 | 15 | 15 | 51 | 62 | 0.823 | 39 | |
| 15 | Newcastle United | 42 | 15 | 9 | 18 | 59 | 72 | 0.819 | 39 | |
| 16 | Arsenal | 42 | 13 | 11 | 18 | 47 | 49 | 0.959 | 37 | |
| 17 | Birmingham City | 42 | 14 | 9 | 19 | 53 | 61 | 0.869 | 37 | |
| 18 | Leicester City | 42 | 12 | 12 | 18 | 46 | 60 | 0.767 | 36 | |
| 19 | Tottenham Hotspur | 42 | 13 | 8 | 21 | 52 | 63 | 0.825 | 34 | |
| 20 | Luton Town (R) | 42 | 11 | 11 | 20 | 47 | 65 | 0.723 | 33 | Relegation to the Second Division |
| 21 | Chelsea (R) | 42 | 9 | 15 | 18 | 42 | 72 | 0.583 | 33 | Relegation to the Second Division |
| 22 | Carlisle United (R) | 42 | 12 | 5 | 25 | 43 | 59 | 0.729 | 29 | Relegation to the Second Division |

Source: World Football
Rules for classification: 1) Points; 2) Goal average; 3) Goals scored
(C) Champions; (R) Relegated

== Results ==
| Home \ Away | ARS | BIR | BUR | CRL | CHE | COV | DER | EVE | IPS | LEE | LEI | LIV | LUT | MCI | MID | NEW | QPR | SHU | STK | TOT | WHU | WOL |
|---|---|---|---|---|---|---|---|---|---|---|---|---|---|---|---|---|---|---|---|---|---|---|
| Arsenal | | 1–1 | 0–1 | 2–1 | 1–2 | 2–0 | 3–1 | 0–2 | 0–1 | 1–2 | 0–0 | 2–0 | 2–2 | 4–0 | 2–0 | 3–0 | 2–2 | 1–0 | 1–1 | 1–0 | 3–0 | 0–0 |
| Birmingham City | 3–1 | | 1–1 | 2–0 | 2–0 | 1–2 | 3–2 | 0–3 | 0–1 | 1–0 | 3–4 | 3–1 | 1–4 | 4–0 | 0–3 | 3–0 | 4–1 | 0–0 | 0–3 | 1–0 | 1–1 | 1–1 |
| Burnley | 3–3 | 2–2 | | 2–1 | 1–2 | 3–0 | 2–5 | 1–1 | 1–0 | 2–1 | 2–0 | 1–1 | 1–0 | 2–1 | 1–1 | 4–1 | 3–0 | 2–1 | 0–0 | 3–2 | 3–5 | 1–2 |
| Carlisle United | 2–1 | 1–0 | 4–2 | | 1–2 | 0–0 | 3–0 | 3–0 | 2–1 | 1–2 | 0–1 | 0–1 | 1–2 | 0–0 | 0–1 | 1–2 | 1–2 | 0–1 | 0–2 | 1–0 | 0–1 | 1–0 |
| Chelsea | 0–0 | 2–1 | 3–3 | 0–2 | | 3–3 | 1–2 | 1–1 | 0–0 | 0–2 | 0–0 | 0–3 | 2–0 | 0–1 | 1–2 | 3–2 | 0–3 | 1–1 | 3–3 | 1–0 | 1–1 | 0–1 |
| Coventry City | 3–0 | 1–0 | 0–3 | 2–1 | 1–3 | | 1–1 | 1–1 | 3–1 | 1–3 | 2–2 | 1–1 | 2–1 | 2–2 | 0–2 | 2–0 | 1–1 | 2–2 | 2–0 | 1–1 | 1–1 | 2–1 |
| Derby County | 2–1 | 2–1 | 3–2 | 0–0 | 4–1 | 1–1 | | 0–1 | 2–0 | 0–0 | 1–0 | 2–0 | 5–0 | 2–1 | 2–3 | 2–2 | 5–2 | 2–0 | 1–2 | 3–1 | 1–0 | 1–0 |
| Everton | 2–1 | 4–1 | 1–1 | 2–3 | 1–1 | 1–0 | 0–0 | | 1–1 | 3–2 | 3–0 | 0–0 | 3–1 | 2–0 | 1–1 | 1–1 | 2–1 | 2–3 | 2–1 | 1–0 | 1–1 | 0–0 |
| Ipswich Town | 3–0 | 3–2 | 2–0 | 3–1 | 2–0 | 4–0 | 3–0 | 1–0 | | 0–0 | 2–1 | 1–0 | 0–1 | 1–1 | 2–0 | 5–4 | 2–1 | 0–1 | 3–1 | 4–0 | 4–1 | 2–0 |
| Leeds United | 2–0 | 1–0 | 2–2 | 3–1 | 2–0 | 0–0 | 0–1 | 0–0 | 2–1 | | 2–2 | 0–2 | 1–1 | 2–2 | 2–2 | 1–1 | 0–1 | 5–1 | 3–1 | 2–1 | 2–1 | 2–0 |
| Leicester City | 0–1 | 1–1 | 1–0 | 1–1 | 1–1 | 0–1 | 0–0 | 0–2 | 0–1 | 0–2 | | 1–1 | 0–0 | 1–0 | 1–0 | 4–0 | 3–1 | 3–0 | 1–1 | 1–2 | 3–0 | 3–2 |
| Liverpool | 1–3 | 1–0 | 0–1 | 2–0 | 2–2 | 2–1 | 2–2 | 0–0 | 5–2 | 1–0 | 2–1 | | 2–0 | 4–1 | 2–0 | 4–0 | 3–1 | 0–0 | 3–0 | 5–2 | 1–1 | 2–0 |
| Luton Town | 2–0 | 1–3 | 2–3 | 3–1 | 1–1 | 1–3 | 1–0 | 2–1 | 1–4 | 2–1 | 3–0 | 1–2 | | 1–1 | 0–1 | 1–0 | 1–1 | 0–1 | 0–0 | 1–1 | 0–0 | 3–2 |
| Manchester City | 2–1 | 3–1 | 2–0 | 1–2 | 1–1 | 1–0 | 1–2 | 2–1 | 1–1 | 2–1 | 4–1 | 2–0 | 1–0 | | 2–1 | 5–1 | 1–0 | 3–2 | 1–0 | 1–0 | 4–0 | 0–0 |
| Middlesbrough | 0–0 | 3–0 | 2–0 | 0–2 | 1–1 | 4–4 | 1–1 | 2–0 | 3–0 | 0–1 | 3–0 | 1–0 | 1–1 | 3–0 | | 0–0 | 1–3 | 1–0 | 2–0 | 3–0 | 0–0 | 2–1 |
| Newcastle United | 3–1 | 1–2 | 3–0 | 1–0 | 5–0 | 3–2 | 0–2 | 0–1 | 1–0 | 3–0 | 0–1 | 4–1 | 1–0 | 2–1 | 2–1 | | 2–2 | 2–2 | 2–2 | 2–5 | 2–0 | 0–0 |
| Queens Park Rangers | 0–0 | 0–1 | 0–1 | 2–1 | 1–0 | 2–0 | 4–1 | 2–2 | 1–0 | 1–1 | 4–2 | 0–1 | 2–1 | 2–0 | 0–0 | 1–2 | | 1–0 | 0–1 | 0–1 | 0–2 | 2–0 |
| Sheffield United | 1–1 | 3–2 | 2–2 | 2–1 | 2–1 | 1–0 | 1–2 | 2–2 | 3–1 | 1–1 | 4–0 | 1–0 | 1–1 | 1–1 | 1–0 | 2–1 | 1–1 | | 2–0 | 0–1 | 3–2 | 1–0 |
| Stoke City | 0–2 | 0–0 | 2–0 | 5–2 | 3–0 | 2–0 | 1–1 | 1–1 | 1–2 | 3–0 | 1–0 | 2–0 | 4–2 | 4–0 | 1–1 | 0–0 | 1–0 | 3–2 | | 2–2 | 2–1 | 2–2 |
| Tottenham Hotspur | 2–0 | 0–0 | 2–3 | 1–1 | 2–0 | 1–1 | 2–0 | 1–1 | 0–1 | 4–2 | 0–3 | 0–2 | 2–1 | 1–2 | 1–2 | 3–0 | 1–2 | 1–3 | 0–2 | | 2–1 | 3–0 |
| West Ham United | 1–0 | 3–0 | 2–1 | 2–0 | 0–1 | 1–2 | 2–2 | 2–3 | 1–0 | 2–1 | 6–2 | 0–0 | 2–0 | 0–0 | 3–0 | 0–1 | 2–2 | 1–2 | 2–2 | 1–1 | | 5–2 |
| Wolverhampton Wanderers | 1–0 | 0–1 | 4–2 | 2–0 | 7–1 | 2–0 | 0–1 | 2–0 | 2–1 | 1–1 | 1–1 | 0–0 | 5–2 | 1–0 | 2–0 | 4–2 | 1–2 | 1–1 | 2–2 | 2–3 | 3–1 | |

Updated to match(es) played on unknown. Source: Ian Laschke: Rothmans Book of Football League Records 1888–89 to 1978–79. Macdonald and Jane’s, London & Sydney, 1980.
Legend: Blue = home team win; Yellow = draw; Red = away team win.

== Managerial changes ==
| Team | Outgoing manager | Manner of departure | Date of vacancy | Position in table | Incoming manager | Date of appointment |
|---|---|---|---|---|---|---|
| Liverpool | (Scotland) Bill Shankly | Retired | 12 July 1974 | Pre-season | (England) Bob Paisley | 12 July 1974 |
| Coventry City | (England) Joe Mercer | Retired | 14 July 1974 | Pre-season | (England) Gordon Milne | 14 July 1974 |
| Leeds United | (England) Don Revie | Signed by England | 15 July 1974 | Pre-season | (England) Brian Clough | 30 July 1974 |
| West Ham United | (England) Ron Greenwood | Became general manager | 16 August 1974 | Pre-season | (England) John Lyall | 16 August 1974 |
| Tottenham Hotspur | (England) Bill Nicholson | Resigned | 29 August 1974 | 22nd | (Northern Ireland) Terry Neill | 1 September 1974 |
| Leeds United | (England) Brian Clough | Sacked | 12 September 1974 | 19th | (England) Jimmy Armfield | 4 October 1974 |
| Queens Park Rangers | (England) Gordon Jago | Sacked | 27 September 1974 | 21st | (England) Dave Sexton | 16 October 1974 |
| Chelsea | (England) Dave Sexton | Sacked | 3 October 1974 | 18th | (England) Ron Suart | 3 October 1974 |
| Chelsea | (England) Ron Suart | Resigned | 16 April 1975 | 20th | (Scotland) Eddie McCreadie | 16 April 1975 |

== Team locations ==
Locations of the Football League First Division 1974–1975 teams
Locations of the Football League First Division London teams 1974–1975

== Top scorers ==
| Rank | Player | Club | Goals |
|---|---|---|---|
| 1 | (England) Malcolm Macdonald | Newcastle United | 21 |
| 2 | (England) Brian Kidd | Arsenal | 19 |
| 3 | (England) Frank Worthington | Leicester City | 18 |
| 4 | (England) Kenny Hibbitt | Wolverhampton Wanderers | 17 |
| 5 | (England) Bob Latchford | Everton | 16 |
| = | (Republic of Ireland) Don Givens | Queens Park Rangers | 16 |
| = | (Wales) Leighton James | Burnley | 16 |
| = | (England) Alan Foggon | Middlesbrough | 16 |
