= 1970–71 Manchester City F.C. season =

English football club season

Manchester City
1970–71 season
- Manager: Joe Mercer
- Stadium: Maine Road
- First Division: 11th
- FA Cup: Fifth Round
- League Cup: Second Round
- UEFA Cup Winners' Cup: Semi-finals
- Anglo-Italian League Cup: Runners-up
- Top goalscorer: League: Francis Lee(14); All: Francis Lee(20)
- Highest home attendance: 45,105 vs Arsenal; 17 February 1971
- Lowest home attendance: 17,975 vs Liverpool; 26 April 1971
- Average home league attendance: 30,846 (9th highest in league)

The 1970–71 season was Manchester City's 69th season of competitive football and 51st season in the top division of English football. In addition to the First Division, the club competed in the FA Cup, Football League Cup, UEFA Cup Winners' Cup and the Anglo-Italian League Cup.

== First Division ==
=== League table ===
Pos	Team	Pld	W	D	L	GF	GA	GAv	Pts
9	Derby County	42	16	10	16	56	54	1.037	42
10	Coventry City	42	16	10	16	37	38	0.974	42
11	Manchester City	42	12	17	13	47	42	1.119	41
12	Newcastle United	42	14	13	15	44	46	0.957	41
13	Stoke City	42	12	13	17	44	48	0.917	37

Source: World Football
Rules for classification: 1) Points; 2) Goal average; 3) Goals scored

=== Results summary ===
Overall								Home						Away					
Pld	W	D	L	GF	GA	GAv	Pts	W	D	L	GF	GA	Pts	W	D	L	GF	GA	Pts
42	12	17	13	47	42	1.119	41	7	9	5	30	22	23	5	8	8	17	20	18

=== Results ===
Date	Opponents	H / A	Venue	Result F – A	Scorers	Attendance
15 August 1970	Southampton	A	The Dell	1 - 1	Bell	24,599
19 August 1970	Crystal Palace	A	Selhurst Park	1 – 0	Oakes	33,118
22 August 1970	Burnley	H	Maine Road	0 – 0		37,849
26 August 1970	Blackpool	H	Maine Road	2 - 0	Lee, Bell	37,598
29 August 1970	Everton	A	Goodison Park	1 – 0	Bell	50,724
5 September 1970	West Bromwich Albion	H	Maine Road	4 – 1	Lee, Bell (2), Summerbee	30,549
12 September 1970	Nottingham Forest	A	City Ground	1 - 0	Doyle	28,896
19 September 1970	Stoke City	H	Maine Road	4 – 1	Book, Young, Banks (og), Lee	35,473
26 September 1970	Tottenham Hotspur	A	White Hart Lane	0 – 2		42,490
3 October 1970	Newcastle United	H	Maine Road	1 - 1	Doyle	31,158
10 October 1970	Chelsea	A	Stamford Bridge	1 – 1	Bell	51,903
17 October 1970	Southampton	H	Maine Road	1 – 1	Lee	31,998
24 October 1970	Wolverhampton Wanderers	A	Molineux Stadium	0 - 3		32,700
31 October 1970	Ipswich Town	H	Maine Road	2 – 0	Lee, Bell	27,317
7 November 1970	Coventry City	A	Highfield Road	1 – 2	Bell	25,287
14 November 1970	Derby County	H	Maine Road	1 – 1	Bell	31,817
21 November 1970	West Ham United	H	Maine Road	2 – 0	Lee (2)	28,485
28 November 1970	Leeds United	A	Elland Road	0 – 1		43,511
5 December 1970	Arsenal	H	Maine Road	0 - 2		43,027
12 December 1970	Manchester United	A	Old Trafford	4 – 1	Doyle, Lee (3)	52,636
19 December 1970	Burnley	A	Turf Moor	4 – 0	Lee, Bell (2), Summerbee	19,917
26 December 1970	Huddersfield Town	H	Maine Road	1 – 1	Bell	40,091
9 January 1971	Crystal Palace	H	Maine Road	1 - 0	Book	27,442
12 January 1971	Liverpool	A	Anfield	0 – 0		45,985
16 January 1971	Blackpool	A	Bloomfield Road	3 – 3	Summerbee (2), Bell	29,356
30 January 1971	Leeds United	H	Maine Road	0 – 2		43,517
6 February 1971	Arsenal	A	Highbury	0 – 1		46,122
20 February 1971	West Ham United	A	Boleyn Ground	0 – 0		30,168
26 February 1971	Ipswich Town	A	Portman Road	0 – 2		20,685
6 March 1971	Wolverhampton Wanderers	H	Maine Road	0 – 0		24,563
13 March 1971	Derby County	A	Baseball Ground	0 – 0		31,987
20 March 1971	Coventry City	H	Maine Road	1 - 1	Lee	22,120
27 March 1971	West Bromwich Albion	A	The Hawthorns	0 – 0		20,100
3 April 1971	Everton	H	Maine Road	3 – 0	Doyle, Hill, Booth	26,885
9 April 1971	Nottingham Forest	H	Maine Road	1 – 3	Doyle	33,772
10 April 1971	Huddersfield Town	A	Leeds Road	0 – 1	Booth	21,992
12 April 1971	Newcastle United	A	St James Park	0 - 0		29,040
17 April 1971	Chelsea	H	Maine Road	1 – 1	Lee	26,120
24 April 1971	Stoke City	A	Victoria Ground	0 - 2		14,836
26 April 1971	Liverpool	H	Maine Road	2 – 2	Ross (og), Carter	17,976
1 May 1971	Tottenham Hotspur	H	Maine Road	0 – 1		19,761
5 May 1971	Manchester United	H	Maine Road	3 – 4	Hill, Lee, Mellor	43,626

== FA Cup ==
=== Results ===
Date	Round	Opponents	H / A	Venue	Result F – A	Scorers	Attendance
2 January 1971	Third round	Wigan Athletic	H	Maine Road	1 – 0	Bell	46,212
23 January 1971	Fourth round	Chelsea	A	Stamford Bridge	3 – 0	Bell (2), Bowyer	50,176
17 February 1971	Fifth round	Arsenal	H	Maine Road	1 – 2	Bell	45,105

== Football League Cup ==
=== Results ===
Date	Round	Opponents	H / A	Venue	Result F – A	Scorers	Attendance
9 September 1970	Second round	Carlisle United	A	Brunton Park	1 – 2	Lee	17,942

== Cup Winners’ Cup ==
=== Results ===
Date	Round	Opponents	H / A	Venue	Result F – A	Scorers	Attendance
16 September 1970	First round 1st leg	Linfield	H	Maine Road	1 – 0	Bell	25,184
30 September 1970	First round 2nd leg	Linfield	A	Windsor Park	1 – 2	Lee	56,296
21 October 1970	Second round 1st leg	Budapest Honved	A	Bozsik József Stadion	1 – 0	Lee	14,000
4 November 1970	Second round 2nd leg	Budapest Honved	H	Maine Road	2 – 0	Bell, Lee	28,770
10 March 1971	Quarter Final 1st leg	Gornik Zabrze	A	Arena Zabrze	0 – 2		100,000
24 March 1971	Quarter Final 2nd leg	Gornik Zabrze	H	Maine Road	2 – 0	Mellor, Doyle	31,950
31 March 1971	Quarter Final Replay	Gornik Zabrze	N	Parken	3 – 1	Young, Booth, Lee	12,100
14 April 1971	Semi Final 1st leg	Chelsea	A	Stamford Bridge	0 – 1		45,955
28 April 1971	Semi Final 2nd leg	Chelsea	H	Maine Road	0 – 1		43,663
