= 1969–70 British Home Championship =

Tournament details
- Dates: 18–25 April 1970
- Teams: 4

Final positions
- Champions: England; Scotland; Wales

Tournament statistics
- Matches played: 6
- Goals scored: 8 (1.33 per match)
- Top scorer: 8 players (1 goal each)

The 1969–70 British Home Championship Home Nations international football tournament was a heavily contested series which contradicted the common view that it would be little more than a warm-up for the English team prior to the 1970 FIFA World Cup, at which they were to defend the title they had won on home soil four years earlier. They had won the two previous tournaments and were considered much stronger than the other three home nations, none of whom had qualified for the finals in Mexico. The English however struggled in their opening fixture, drawing with the Welsh away, and although they subsequently beat the Irish, were unable to overcome the Scots. Scotland had a good opening to the campaign, but drew their last two games, whilst Wales salvaged parity following a victory over Northern Ireland in their final fixture. Since goal difference was not at this time used to determine position, England, Wales and Scotland shared the trophy.

== Table ==
Team	Pld	W	D	L	GF	GA	GD	Pts
England (C)	3	1	2	0	4	2	+2	4
Wales (C)	3	1	2	0	2	1	+1	4
Scotland (C)	3	1	2	0	1	0	+1	4
Ireland	3	0	0	3	1	5	−4	0

Rules for classification: 1) points. The points system worked as follows: 2 points for a win and 1 point for a draw.
(C) Co-champions

== Results ==
18 April 1970

Wales	1–1	England
Krzywicki 40'		Lee 71'

Ninian Park, Cardiff
Attendance: 40,126
Referee: Tiny Wharton (Scotland)

18 April 1970

Ireland	0–1	Scotland
		O'Hare 58'

Windsor Park, Belfast
Attendance: 31,000
Referee: Eric Jennings (England)

21 April 1970

England	3–1	Ireland
Peters 6'; Hurst 57'; B. Charlton 81'		Best 50'

Wembley Stadium, London
Attendance: 100,000
Referee: Gaspar Pintado Viú (Spain)

22 April 1970

Scotland	0–0	Wales

Hampden Park, Glasgow
Attendance: 30,434
Referee: David Smith (England)

25 April 1970

Scotland	0–0	England

Hampden Park, Glasgow
Attendance: 137,438
Referee: Gerhard Schulenburg (West Germany)

25 April 1970

Wales	1–0	Ireland
Rees 36'

Vetch Field, Swansea
Attendance: 27,067
Referee: Jim Finney (England)
