= 1967–68 Football League First Division =

1967–68 season of Football League First Division

Football League First Division
- Season: 1967–68
- Champions: Manchester City; 2nd English title
- Relegated: Sheffield United; Fulham
- European Cup: Manchester City; Manchester United
- European Cup Winners' Cup: West Bromwich Albion
- Inter-Cities Fairs Cup: Liverpool; Leeds United; Chelsea; Newcastle United
- Matches: 462
- Goals: 1,398 (3.03 per match)
- Top goalscorer: George Best; Ron Davies (28 goals each)
- Longest winning run: 7 matches Everton
- Longest unbeaten run: 14 matches Leeds United
- Longest losing run: 7 matches Stoke City

In the 1967–68 Football League First Division season Manchester City won the First Division title for the second time in the club's history, and for the first time since 1937. They won the title on the final day on 11 May, with a 4–3 win at Newcastle United whilst the defending champions and their nearest rivals Manchester United lost 2–1 at home to Sunderland. Fulham were relegated on 1 May, after losing 2–0 at home against Stoke City, who survived on the last weekend of the season on 11 May, with a draw against Leicester City at the expense of Sheffield United, who lost 2–1 at home to Chelsea.

== League standings ==
Pos	Team	Pld	W	D	L	GF	GA	GAv	Pts	Qualification or relegation
1	Manchester City (C)	42	26	6	10	86	43	2.000	58	Qualification for the European Cup first round
2	Manchester United	42	24	8	10	89	55	1.618	56	Qualification for the European Cup first round (Note: Manchester United qualified for the European Cup as the 1967–68 European Cup winners.)
3	Liverpool	42	22	11	9	71	40	1.775	55	Qualification for the Inter-Cities Fairs Cup first round
4	Leeds United	42	22	9	11	71	41	1.732	53	Qualification for the Inter-Cities Fairs Cup first round
5	Everton	42	23	6	13	67	40	1.675	52	
6	Chelsea	42	18	12	12	62	68	0.912	48	Qualification for the Inter-Cities Fairs Cup first round (Note: Everton were ineligible to participate in the Inter-Cities Fairs Cup as Liverpool had already qualified. Under the rules of the cup, only one team per city could participate. Chelsea took their place as the highest-ranked team that hadn't already qualified for a European competition.)
7	Tottenham Hotspur	42	19	9	14	70	59	1.186	47	
8	West Bromwich Albion	42	17	12	13	75	62	1.210	46	Qualification for the European Cup Winners' Cup first round (Note: West Bromwich Albion qualified for the European Cup Winners' Cup as the 1967-68 FA Cup winners.)
9	Arsenal	42	17	10	15	60	56	1.071	44	
10	Newcastle United	42	13	15	14	54	67	0.806	41	Qualification for the Inter-Cities Fairs Cup first round (Note: Arsenal and Tottenham Hotspur were ineligible to participate in the Inter-Cities Fairs Cup as Chelsea had already qualified. Under the rules of the cup, only one team per city could participate. Newcastle United took their place as the highest-ranked team that hadn't already qualified for a European competition.)
11	Nottingham Forest	42	14	11	17	52	64	0.813	39	
12	West Ham United	42	14	10	18	73	69	1.058	38	
13	Leicester City	42	13	12	17	64	69	0.928	38	
14	Burnley	42	14	10	18	64	71	0.901	38	
15	Sunderland	42	13	11	18	51	61	0.836	37	
16	Southampton	42	13	11	18	66	83	0.795	37	
17	Wolverhampton Wanderers	42	14	8	20	66	75	0.880	36	
18	Stoke City	42	14	7	21	50	73	0.685	35	
19	Sheffield Wednesday	42	11	12	19	51	63	0.810	34	
20	Coventry City	42	9	15	18	51	71	0.718	33	
21	Sheffield United (R)	42	11	10	21	49	70	0.700	32	Relegation to the Second Division
22	Fulham (R)	42	10	7	25	56	98	0.571	27	Relegation to the Second Division

Source: World Football
Rules for classification: 1) Points; 2) Goal average; 3) Goals scored
(C) Champions; (R) Relegated

== Results ==
Home \ Away	ARS	BUR	CHE	COV	EVE	FUL	LEE	LEI	LIV	MCI	MUN	NEW	NOT	SHU	SHW	SOU	STK	SUN	TOT	WBA	WHU	WOL
Arsenal		2–0	1–1	1–1	2–2	5–3	4–3	2–1	2–0	1–0	0–2	0–0	3–0	1–1	3–2	0–3	2–0	2–1	4–0	2–1	0–0	0–2
Burnley	1–0		1–1	2–1	2–1	2–0	3–0	1–1	1–1	0–1	2–1	2–0	1–1	0–2	2–1	2–0	4–0	3–0	5–1	0–0	3–3	1–1
Chelsea	2–1	2–1		1–1	1–1	1–1	0–0	4–1	3–1	1–0	1–1	1–1	1–0	4–2	3–0	2–6	2–2	1–0	2–0	0–3	1–3	1–0
Coventry City	1–1	5–1	2–1		0–2	0–3	0–1	0–1	1–1	0–3	2–0	1–4	1–3	2–2	3–0	2–1	2–0	2–2	2–3	4–2	1–1	1–0
Everton	2–0	2–0	2–1	3–1		5–1	0–1	2–1	1–0	1–1	3–1	1–0	1–0	1–0	1–0	4–2	3–0	3–0	0–1	2–1	2–0	4–2
Fulham	1–3	4–3	2–2	1–1	2–1		0–5	0–1	1–1	2–4	0–4	2–0	2–0	0–1	2–0	2–2	0–2	3–2	1–2	1–2	0–3	1–2
Leeds United	3–1	2–1	7–0	1–1	2–0	2–0		3–2	1–2	2–0	1–0	2–0	1–1	3–0	3–2	5–0	2–0	1–1	1–0	3–1	2–1	2–1
Leicester City	2–2	0–2	2–2	0–0	0–2	1–2	2–2		2–1	1–0	2–2	2–2	4–2	3–1	3–0	4–1	0–0	0–2	2–3	2–3	2–4	3–1
Liverpool	2–0	3–2	3–1	1–0	1–0	4–1	2–0	3–1		1–1	1–2	6–0	6–1	1–2	1–0	2–0	2–1	2–1	1–1	4–1	3–1	2–1
Manchester City	1–1	4–2	1–0	3–1	2–0	5–0	1–0	6–0	0–0		1–2	2–0	2–0	5–2	1–0	4–2	4–2	1–0	4–1	0–2	3–0	2–0
Manchester United	1–0	2–2	1–3	4–0	3–1	3–0	1–0	1–1	1–2	1–3		6–0	3–0	1–0	4–2	3–2	1–0	1–2	3–1	2–1	3–1	4–0
Newcastle United	2–1	1–0	5–1	3–2	1–0	2–1	1–1	0–0	1–1	3–4	2–2		0–0	1–0	4–0	3–0	1–1	2–1	1–3	2–2	1–0	2–0
Nottingham Forest	2–0	1–0	3–0	3–3	1–0	2–2	0–2	2–1	0–1	0–3	3–1	4–0		1–0	0–0	2–2	3–0	0–3	0–0	3–2	1–1	3–1
Sheffield United	2–4	1–0	1–2	2–0	0–1	2–3	1–0	0–0	1–1	0–3	0–3	2–1	1–3		0–1	4–1	1–0	1–2	3–2	1–1	1–2	1–1
Sheffield Wednesday	1–2	2–1	2–2	4–0	0–0	4–2	0–1	2–1	1–2	1–1	1–1	1–1	0–0	1–1		2–0	1–1	0–1	1–2	2–2	4–1	2–2
Southampton	2–0	2–2	3–5	0–0	3–2	2–1	1–1	1–5	1–0	3–2	2–2	0–0	2–1	3–3	2–0		1–2	3–2	1–2	4–0	0–0	1–1
Stoke City	0–1	0–2	0–1	3–3	1–0	0–1	3–2	3–2	2–1	3–0	2–4	2–1	1–3	1–1	0–1	3–2		2–1	2–1	0–0	2–0	0–2
Sunderland	2–0	2–2	2–3	1–1	1–0	3–0	2–2	0–2	1–1	1–0	1–1	3–3	1–0	2–1	0–2	0–3	3–1		0–1	0–0	1–5	2–0
Tottenham Hotspur	1–0	5–0	2–0	4–2	1–1	2–2	2–1	0–1	1–1	1–3	1–2	1–1	1–1	1–1	2–1	6–1	3–0	3–0		0–0	5–1	2–1
West Bromwich Albion	1–3	8–1	0–1	0–1	2–6	2–1	2–0	0–0	0–2	3–2	6–3	2–0	2–1	4–1	1–1	0–0	3–0	0–0	2–0		3–1	4–1
West Ham United	1–1	4–2	0–1	0–0	1–1	7–2	0–0	4–2	1–0	2–3	1–3	5–0	3–0	3–0	2–3	0–1	3–4	1–1	2–1	2–3		1–2
Wolverhampton Wanderers	3–2	3–2	3–0	2–0	1–3	3–2	2–0	1–3	1–1	0–0	2–3	2–2	6–1	1–3	2–3	2–0	3–4	2–1	2–1	3–3	1–2	

Updated to match(es) played on unknown. Source: Ian Laschke: Rothmans Book of Football League Records 1888–89 to 1978–79. Macdonald and Jane’s, London & Sydney, 1980.
Legend: Blue = home team win; Yellow = draw; Red = away team win.

== Team locations ==
Locations of the Football League First Division 1967–68 teams
Locations of the Football League First Division London teams 1967–68

== Top scorers ==
Rank	Player	Club	Goals
1	(Northern Ireland) George Best	Manchester United	28
=	(Wales) Ron Davies	Southampton	28
3	(England) Jeff Astle	West Bromwich Albion	26
4	(England) Roger Hunt	Liverpool	25
5	(England) Jimmy Greaves	Tottenham Hotspur	23
