= 1967–68 Manchester City F.C. season =

English football club season

Manchester City F.C.
1967–68 season
- Manager: Joe Mercer and Malcolm Allison
- First Division: 1st
- FA Cup: Fourth round
- League Cup: Fourth round
- Top goalscorer: League: Neil Young (19); All: Neil Young (21)
- Highest home attendance: 62,942 vs Manchester United (30 September 1967)
- Lowest home attendance: 22,002 vs Southampton (30 August 1967)
- Average home league attendance: 37,223 (6th highest in league)
Home colours

The 1967–68 season was Manchester City Football Club's seventy-sixth season of league football and their second consecutive season in the First Division. In the third full season under the management of Joe Mercer and Malcolm Allison, Manchester City were unfancied at the start of the season due to a mid-table finish a year before. However, following the signing of forward Francis Lee, the Blues embarked on an unbeaten run that saw them challenge for the top of the table. A televised victory against Tottenham Hotspur in snowy conditions proved particularly notable, becoming known as the Ballet on Ice.

Going into the final match of the season, Manchester City led the table. A 4–3 win at Newcastle United clinched the club's second league title, with City finishing by two clear points over rivals Manchester United. The league championship was the first trophy of the most successful period in Manchester City's history. Under Mercer and Allison, the club won a further four domestic and European trophies in the following two seasons.

== Background and pre-season ==
The 1966–67 season had been Manchester City's first in the top flight after winning promotion from the Second Division in 1966. A fifteenth-place finish consolidated the club's place in the division. Club captain Johnny Crossan struggled with injuries in 1966–67, and was sold to Middlesbrough for £34,500 in the close season. Tony Book succeeded him as captain. The club made no major signings before the start of the season, though Tony Coleman, a winger with a wild off-field reputation, had arrived from Doncaster Rovers at the tail-end of the 1966–67 season. Mercer had reservations about signing Coleman, but Allison convinced Mercer that he could pacify a man he once described as "the nightmare of a delirious probation officer". City also attempted to sign England international goalkeeper Gordon Banks, but were outbid by Stoke City.

The team travelled to Europe in pre-season, playing friendlies against Eintracht Braunschweig and Standard Liège. After returning to England they played Portsmouth at Fratton Park, winning 2–0, and finished their preparations with a resounding home win against Borussia Dortmund. Between matches, the players followed a fitness plan created by former athlete Joe Lancaster, under instruction from Malcolm Allison. The training regime was initially unpopular with the players; the severity of the first session caused some players to vomit.

== First Division ==
City's season opened with a 0–0 draw at home to Liverpool. City were awarded a penalty, but new captain Tony Book hit it wide. Two defeats followed, at Southampton and Stoke. The Stoke defeat led to a tactical switch. Mike Summerbee, who played wide on the right at the start of the season, was moved to centre-forward. The change reaped immediate dividends, with Summerbee playing a leading role in a 4–2 win against Southampton. This was the first in a run of five straight wins, after which Manchester City had caught up with the league leaders. During this run of wins young winger Stan Bowles made his league debut, scoring twice in a 5–2 win against Sheffield United.

Manchester City's first transfer business of the season brought goalkeeper Ken Mulhearn to the club from Stockport County on 21 September, a deal that involved City's back-up goalkeeper Alan Ogley moving in the opposite direction. Harry Dowd kept goal in the next match, a 1–0 defeat at Arsenal, but then dislocated a finger, prompting a debut for Mulhearn in the season's first Manchester derby. Mulhearn was reputedly so nervous before the match that Allison locked him in the medical room until he calmed down. Colin Bell scored the opener after five minutes, but two Bobby Charlton goals meant a win for Manchester United. In the second half of the match, Bowles exchanged punches with Brian Kidd, though neither man was sent off, largely thanks to the intervention of their respective captains. The derby loss was followed by a third consecutive defeat, at Sunderland.

A couple of days after the Roker Park defeat, Manchester City completed the signing of centre-forward Francis Lee from Bolton Wanderers for a club record £60,000. During negotiations Mercer stated to Lee that "we feel we've got the start of a good side. We are just one player short, and we think you are that player." Lee made his debut in a 2–0 win at home to Wolverhampton Wanderers, the start of an 11 match unbeaten run, including a 6–0 win against Leicester City.

=== Ballet on Ice ===
Midway through their unbeaten run, City faced Tottenham Hotspur at home in snowy conditions, in a match televised on Match of the Day. As the teams came out onto the frozen pitch, commentator Kenneth Wolstenholme called the Manchester City team as "the most exciting team in England". Aided by a modification to the studs on their boots suggested by Tony Book, City produced one of their best footballing performances in their history. One Spurs player was quoted as saying, "It was extraordinary. City moved like Olympic speed skaters while we were falling around like clowns on a skid patch." Tottenham took an early lead through Jimmy Greaves, but Bell equalised before half-time, and in the second half City besieged Tottenham, scoring three more times to win 4–1. After the match City trailed the league leaders by only a single point.

The match was named as Match of the Day's "Match of the Season", and as the only match at Maine Road that season to be recorded for television, is the foremost recorded example of the 1967–68 team in action.

The unbeaten run came to an end at Christmas, with back-to-back defeats in matches against West Bromwich Albion causing the club to fall to fourth place. The team commenced 1968 with a seven match unbeaten run, starting with consecutive 3–0 wins at Nottingham Forest and Sheffield United, and culminating in a 5–1 defeat of Fulham to go top of the table. The run came to an end with a defeat at Don Revie's Leeds United, which also meant City were overtaken at the top of the table by local rivals Manchester United. A visit to United's Old Trafford ground then followed. United took an early lead, but City rallied to win 3–1.

In late April, after City won 1–0 against Sheffield Wednesday and title rivals Manchester United lost to West Bromwich Albion, City were in a position where winning their final three games would all but guarantee the championship. In the first of the three, a home match against Everton, City won 2–0 in a match featuring Tony Book's first league goal for the club. Next was Tottenham Hotspur at White Hart Lane. City took a 3–0 lead before half time, eventually winning 3–1.

=== Title decider at Newcastle ===
Going into the final match, City were level on points with neighbours Manchester United, with City holding the advantage in goal average – the first decider if teams finished level on points – but needing to win to be sure of staying above their cross-city rivals. Liverpool were three points behind, but had a game in hand, so could still win the title if both City and United faltered. City faced tenth-placed Newcastle United at St James' Park; United were at home to bottom-half Sunderland. Bookmakers made United slight favourites for the title.

Mike Summerbee opened the scoring on 13 minutes, but Newcastle soon equalised. Neil Young made it 2–1, but again Newcastle equalised. A second strike by Young was disallowed for offside, and at half-time the score was 2–2. Straight after half-time Young scored again, and Francis Lee scored a fourth on 63 minutes. A late Newcastle goal set up a nervy finish, but City held on to win 4–3 and secure the title. The win was compounded by a 2–1 victory by Sunderland over Manchester United, giving City the title. Liverpool won one of their remaining games but lost the other, missing their chance to leapfrog United into second by one point.

=== Matches ===
| Date | Opponents | H / A | Venue | Result F–A | Scorers | Attendance |
|---|---|---|---|---|---|---|
| 19 August 1967 | Liverpool | H | Maine Road | 0–0 | | 49,531 |
| 23 August 1967 | Southampton | A | The Dell | 2–3 | Bell, Coleman | 23,675 |
| 26 August 1967 | Stoke City | A | Victoria Ground | 0–3 | | 22,426 |
| 30 August 1967 | Southampton | H | Maine Road | 4–2 | Bell (2), Young (2) | 22,002 |
| 2 September 1967 | Nottingham Forest | H | Maine Road | 2–0 | Coleman, Summerbee | 29,547 |
| 6 September 1967 | Newcastle United | H | Maine Road | 2–0 | Hince, Young | 29,978 |
| 9 September 1967 | Coventry City | A | Highfield Road | 3–0 | Bell, Hince, Summerbee | 34,578 |
| 16 September 1967 | Sheffield United | H | Maine Road | 5–2 | Bowles (2), Bell, Summerbee, Young | 31,922 |
| 23 September 1967 | Arsenal | A | Highbury | 0–1 | | 41,567 |
| 30 September 1967 | Manchester United | H | Maine Road | 1–2 | Bell | 62,942 |
| 7 October 1967 | Sunderland | A | Roker Park | 0–1 | | 27,885 |
| 14 October 1967 | Wolverhampton Wanderers | H | Maine Road | 2–0 | Doyle, Young | 36,476 |
| 21 October 1967 | Fulham | A | Craven Cottage | 4–2 | Summerbee (2), Lee, Young | 22,108 |
| 28 October 1967 | Leeds United | H | Maine Road | 1–0 | Bell | 39,713 |
| 4 November 1967 | Everton | A | Goodison Park | 1–1 | Connor | 47,144 |
| 11 November 1967 | Leicester City | H | Maine Road | 6–0 | Lee (2), Young (2), Doyle, Oakes | 29,039 |
| 18 November 1967 | West Ham United | A | Upton Park | 3–2 | Lee (2), Summerbee | 25,495 |
| 25 November 1967 | Burnley | H | Maine Road | 4–2 | Coleman (2), Summerbee, Young | 37,098 |
| 2 December 1967 | Sheffield Wednesday | A | Hillsborough | 1–1 | Oakes | 38,207 |
| 9 December 1967 | Tottenham Hotspur | H | Maine Road | 4–1 | Bell, Coleman, Summerbee, Young | 35,792 |
| 16 December 1967 | Liverpool | A | Anfield | 1–1 | Lee | 53,268 |
| 23 December 1967 | Stoke City | H | Maine Road | 4–2 | Lee (2), Coleman, Young | 40,121 |
| 18 December 1967 | West Bromwich Albion | A | The Hawthorns | 2–3 | Lee, Summerbee | 44,897 |
| 30 December 1967 | West Bromwich Albion | H | Maine Road | 0–2 | | 45,754 |
| 6 January 1968 | Nottingham Forest | A | City Ground | 3–0 | Coleman, Summerbee, Young | 39,581 |
| 20 January 1968 | Sheffield United | A | Bramall Lane | 3–0 | Bell, Doyle, Lee | 32,142 |
| 3 February 1968 | Arsenal | H | Maine Road | 1–1 | Lee | 42,392 |
| 24 February 1968 | Sunderland | H | Maine Road | 1–0 | Lee | 28,642 |
| 2 March 1968 | Burnley | A | Turf Moor | 1–0 | Lee | 23,486 |
| 9 March 1968 | Coventry City | H | Maine Road | 3–1 | Bell, Summerbee, Young | 33,310 |
| 16 March 1968 | Fulham | H | Maine Road | 5–1 | Young (2), Bell, Lee, Summerbee | 30,773 |
| 23 March 1968 | Leeds United | A | Elland Road | 0–2 | | 51,818 |
| 27 March 1968 | Manchester United | A | Old Trafford | 3–1 | Bell, Heslop, Lee | 63,004 |
| 6 April 1968 | Leicester City | A | Filbert Street | 0–1 | | 24,925 |
| 12 April 1968 | Chelsea | H | Maine Road | 1–0 | Doyle | 47,132 |
| 13 April 1968 | West Ham United | H | Maine Road | 3–0 | Young (2), Doyle | 38,755 |
| 16 April 1968 | Chelsea | A | Stamford Bridge | 0–1 | | 36,466 |
| 20 April 1968 | Wolverhampton Wanderers | A | Molineux | 0–0 | | 39,632 |
| 25 April 1968 | Sheffield Wednesday | H | Maine Road | 1–0 | Own goal | 32,999 |
| 29 April 1968 | Everton | H | Maine Road | 2–0 | Book, Coleman | 37,786 |
| 4 May 1968 | Tottenham Hotspur | A | White Hart Lane | 3–1 | Bell (2), Summerbee | 51,242 |
| 11 May 1968 | Newcastle United | A | St James' Park | 4–3 | Young (2), Lee, Summerbee | 46,492 |

| Pos | Team | Pld | W | D | L | GF | GA | GAv | Pts | Qualification or relegation |
|---|---|---|---|---|---|---|---|---|---|---|
| 1 | Manchester City (C) | 42 | 26 | 6 | 10 | 86 | 43 | 2.000 | 58 | Qualification for the European Cup first round (Note: Manchester United qualified for the European Cup as the 1967–68 European Cup winners.) |
| 2 | Manchester United | 42 | 24 | 8 | 10 | 89 | 55 | 1.618 | 56 | Qualification for the European Cup first round |
| 3 | Liverpool | 42 | 22 | 11 | 9 | 71 | 40 | 1.775 | 55 | Qualification for the Inter-Cities Fairs Cup first round |
| 4 | Leeds United | 42 | 22 | 9 | 11 | 71 | 41 | 1.732 | 53 | Qualification for the Inter-Cities Fairs Cup first round |
| 5 | Everton | 42 | 23 | 6 | 13 | 67 | 40 | 1.675 | 52 | |

Source: World Football
Rules for classification: 1) Points; 2) Goal average; 3) Goals scored
(C) Champions

=== Results summary ===
| Overall | | | | | | | | Home | | | | | | Away | | | | | |
| Pld | W | D | L | GF | GA | GAv | Pts | W | D | L | GF | GA | Pts | W | D | L | GF | GA | Pts |
|---|---|---|---|---|---|---|---|---|---|---|---|---|---|---|---|---|---|---|---|
| 42 | 26 | 6 | 10 | 86 | 43 | 2 | 58 | 17 | 2 | 2 | 52 | 17 | 36 | 9 | 4 | 8 | 34 | 26 | 22 |

Source: rsssf.com

== FA Cup ==
As a top-flight side, Manchester City entered the FA Cup in the third round proper, and were drawn at home to Reading of the Third Division. With City unusually wearing their maroon change kit, the match finished goalless, with Tony Coleman missing a penalty. The replay at Elm Park was a one-sided affair. City won 7–0, as Mike Summerbee scored a hat-trick. In the fourth round, another home tie finished 0–0, this time against Leicester City. In the replay, Manchester City squandered a 2–0 lead and lost 4–3.

| Date | Round | Opponents | H / A | Venue | Result F–A | Scorers | Attendance |
|---|---|---|---|---|---|---|---|
| 27 January 1968 | Third round | Reading | H | Maine Road | 0–0 | | 40,343 |
| 31 January 1968 | Third round replay | Reading | A | Elm Park | 7–0 | Heslop 26', Summerbee 28' 49' 79', Bell 64', Coleman 75', Young 80' | 25,659 |
| 17 February 1968 | Fourth round | Leicester City | H | Maine Road | 0–0 | | 51,009 |
| 19 February 1968 | Fourth round replay | Leicester City | A | Filbert Street | 3–4 | Lee (pen) 6', Summerbee 24', Bell 88' | 39,112 |

== League Cup ==
Manchester City's League Cup run saw two notable debuts for young players. In the second round against Leicester City, Stan Bowles scored twice in a 4–0 win. In the next round against Blackpool, Joe Corrigan made the first of his 605 appearances for the club. City progressed after a replay. Fulham were the opponents in the fourth round, meaning City visited Craven Cottage for the second time in as many weeks. However, they could not replicate their league win and lost 3–2.

| Date | Round | Opponents | H / A | Venue | Result F–A | Scorers | Attendance |
|---|---|---|---|---|---|---|---|
| 13 September 1967 | Second round | Leicester City | H | Maine Road | 4–0 | Bowles (2), Book, Young | 25,653 |
| 11 October 1967 | Third round | Blackpool | H | Maine Road | 1–1 | Summerbee | 27,633 |
| 18 October 1967 | Third round replay | Blackpool | A | Bloomfield Road | 2–0 | Summerbee, Craven (o.g.) | 23,405 |
| 1 November 1967 | Fourth round | Fulham | A | Craven Cottage | 2–3 | Oakes, Bell | 11,732 |

== Squad statistics ==
=== Squad ===
Appearances for competitive matches only

| Pos. | Name | Apps | Goals | Apps | Goals | Apps | Goals | Apps | Goals |
| Pos. | Name | First Division | | FA Cup | | League Cup | | Total | |
|---|---|---|---|---|---|---|---|---|---|
| GK | (England) Joe Corrigan | 0 (0) | 0 | 0 | 0 | 2 | 0 | 2 (0) | 0 |
| GK | (England) Harry Dowd | 7 (0) | 0 | 0 | 0 | 2 | 0 | 9 (0) | 0 |
| GK | (England) Ken Mulhearn | 33 (0) | 0 | 4 | 0 | 0 | 0 | 37 (0) | 0 |
| GK | (England) Alan Ogley | 2 (0) | 0 | 0 | 0 | 0 | 0 | 2 (0) | 0 |
| DF | (England) Tony Book | 42 (0) | 1 | 4 | 0 | 4 | 1 | 50 (0) | 2 |
| DF | (England) Mike Doyle | 37 (1) | 5 | 4 | 0 | 3 | 0 | 44 (1) | 5 |
| DF | (England) George Heslop | 41 (0) | 1 | 4 | 1 | 4 | 0 | 43 (0) | 0 |
| DF | (England) Glyn Pardoe | 41 (0) | 0 | 4 | 0 | 4 | 0 | 49 (0) | 0 |
| DF | (England) Jeff Street | 13 (6) | 3 | 0 | 0 | 0 | 0 | 1 (1) | 0 |
| MF | (England) Colin Bell | 35 (0) | 14 | 4 | 2 | 4 | 1 | 43 (0) | 17 |
| MF | (England) Roy Cheetham | 2 (1) | 0 | 0 | 0 | 0 | 0 | 2 (1) | 0 |
| MF | (England) David Connor | 10 (3) | 1 | 0 (1) | 0 | 0 (1) | 0 | 12 (5) | 1 |
| MF | (England) Stan Horne | 4 (1) | 0 | 0 | 0 | 1 (1) | 0 | 5 (2) | 0 |
| MF | (Scotland) Bobby Kennedy | 4 (2) | 0 | 0 | 0 | 0 | 0 | 4 (2) | 0 |
| MF | (England) Alan Oakes | 41 (0) | 2 | 4 | 0 | 4 | 1 | 49 (0) | 3 |
| FW | (England) Stan Bowles | 4 (0) | 2 | 0 | 0 | 0 (1) | 0 | 4 (1) | 4 |
| FW | (England) Tony Coleman | 38 (0) | 8 | 4 | 1 | 4 | 0 | 46 (0) | 8 |
| FW | (England) Paul Hince | 6 (0) | 2 | 0 | 0 | 4 | 0 | 10 (0) | 2 |
| FW | (England) Francis Lee | 31 (0) | 16 | 4 | 1 | 0 | 0 | 35 (0) | 17 |
| FW | (England) Chris Jones | 2 (0) | 0 | 0 | 0 | 0 | 0 | 2 (0) | 0 |
| FW | (England) Mike Summerbee | 41 (0) | 14 | 4 | 4 | 4 | 2 | 49 (0) | 20 |
| FW | (England) Neil Young | 40 (0) | 19 | 4 | 1 | 4 | 1 | 48 (0) | 21 |

== Transfers ==
=== In ===
| Date | Pos. | Name | From | Fee |
|---|---|---|---|---|
| September 1967 | GK | (England) Ken Mulhearn | (England) Stockport County | |
| October 1967 | FW | (England) Francis Lee | (England) Bolton Wanderers | £60,000 |

=== Out ===
| Date | Pos. | Name | To | Fee |
|---|---|---|---|---|
| August 1967 | FW | (Northern Ireland) Johnny Crossan | (England) Middlesbrough | £34,500 |
| 1967 | FW | (Scotland) Ralph Brand | (England) Sunderland | |
| September 1967 | GK | (England) Alan Ogley | (England) Stockport County | Part exchange |

== Legacy ==
The league championship was Manchester City's first trophy since the 1956 FA Cup. The triumph was the first in the club's most successful period of the 20th century. Under Mercer and Allison, City went on to win the FA Cup in 1969, and the League Cup and the European Cup Winners' Cup in 1970. The Mercer-Allison partnership changed in October 1971, with Allison taking the manager's role, and came to an end in June 1972 when Mercer left to take charge of Coventry City.

As a result of the title win, Manchester City entered European competition for the first time. However, Malcolm Allison's prediction that City would "terrify Europe" proved inaccurate, with the club losing to Fenerbahçe in the first round of the European Cup. A more humble and concentrated approach a year later proved efficient, as City clinched their first European trophy in 1970.

== See also ==
- List of Manchester City F.C. seasons

== Bibliography ==
- Book, Tony; Clayton, David (2004). Maine Man. Mainstream. ISBN 1-84018-812-X.
- Goldstone, Phil; Saffer, David (2005). Manchester City Champions 1967/68. Stroud: Tempus. ISBN 0-7524-3611-2.
- James, Gary (2005). The Official Manchester City Hall of Fame. Hamlyn. ISBN 0-600-61282-1.
- James, Gary (2006). Manchester City – The Complete Record. Derby: Breedon. ISBN 1-85983-512-0.
- James, Gary (2009). The Big Book of City. Halifax: James Ward. ISBN 978-0-9558127-2-9.
- Penney, Ian (2008). Manchester City: The Mercer-Allison Years. Derby: Breedon. ISBN 978-1-85983-608-8.
- Summerbee, Mike; Holden, Jim (2008). Mike Summerbee – The Autobiography. Century. ISBN 978-1-84605-493-8.
- Tossell, David (2008). Big Mal: The High Life and Hard Times of Malcolm Allison, Football Legend. Edinburgh: Mainstream. ISBN 978-1-84596-478-8.
- Ward, Andrew (1984). The Manchester City Story. Derby: Breedon. ISBN 0-907969-05-4.
- Kay, Steve (2009). "mcfcstats.com".
