= Bounce =

Bounce or The Bounce may refer to:

- Deflection (physics), the event where an object collides with and bounces against a plane surface

== Books ==
- Mr. Bounce, a character from the Mr. Men series of children's books

== Broadcasting, film and TV ==
- Bounce (film), 2000 film starring Gwyneth Paltrow and Ben Affleck

=== Radio ===
- WMGC-FM (105.1 The Bounce), a radio station in Detroit, Michigan
- KZCE (101.1 The Bounce), a radio station in Phoenix, Arizona
- Bounce (radio network), branding for an adult hits format used by several Bell Media Radio stations in Canada since 2021
- CHBN-FM, a radio station in Edmonton, Alberta, Canada, known as 91.7 The Bounce from 2005 - 2017
- CJCH-FM, a radio station in Halifax, Nova Scotia, Canada, known as 101.3 The Bounce from 2008 - 2016

=== Stage productions ===
- Bounce (musical), the original title of Road Show, a musical by Stephen Sondheim and John Weidman

=== Television ===
==== Networks ====
- Bounce TV, a U.S. television network with programming mainly aimed at African Americans

==== Series ====
- Bounce (Australian TV series), an Australian sports show airing since 2007, formerly known as Before the Bounce and After the Bounce
- Hit the Floor (TV series), a 2013-2016 VH1 series
- The Bounce (TV series), a 2010 Australian sports show

==== Episodes ====
- "Bounce" (NCIS), an episode of NCIS

== Games ==
- Bounces (video game), a 1985 sports/fighting game
- Bounce (mobile game), a mobile game series from Nokia

== Music and dance ==
- Bounce music, a style of hip hop music that originated in New Orleans
- Bouncy techno or bounce, a style of UK rave hardcore dance music

=== Albums ===
- Bounce (Bon Jovi album) or the title song (see below), 2002
- Bounce (Terence Blanchard album) or the title song, 2003
- Bounce, by The Beat featuring Ranking Roger, 2016
- Bounce, an EP by JJ Project, or the title song, 2012

=== Songs ===
- "Bounce" (Bon Jovi song), 2002
- "Bounce" (The Cab song), 2008
- "Bounce" (Calvin Harris song), 2011
- "Bounce" (Iggy Azalea song), 2013
- "Bounce" (JJ Project song), 2012
- "Bounce" (Samantha Jade song), 2019
- "Bounce" (Sarah Connor song), 2003
- "Bounce" (Tarkan song), 2005
- "Bounce" (Timbaland song), 2008
- "Bounce", by 2 Chainz from ColleGrove
- "Bounce", by Aaron Carter from Aaron's Party (Come Get It)
- "Bounce", by Aitch from 4
- "Bounce", by Charli XCX from XCX World
- "Bounce", by Cho Yong-pil
- "Bounce", by Danko Jones from My Love Is Bold
- "Bounce", by Emphatic
- "Bounce", by Hadouken! from Not Here to Please You
- "Bounce", by the Jonas Brothers
- "Bounce", by Katchafire
- "Bounce", by LMFAO from Party Rock
- "Bounce", by Marshmello from Joytime
- "Bounce", by MSTRKRFT from Fist of God
- "Bounce", by Raven-Symoné from Undeniable
- "Bounce", by Run–D.M.C. from The Beavis and Butt-head Experience
- "Bounce", by System of a Down from Toxicity
- "Bounce", by Thousand Foot Krutch from Phenomenon
- "Bounce", by Toya from Toya
- "The Bounce", by Jay-Z from The Blueprint 2: The Gift & The Curse
- "Bouncy", by Rocket Punch
- "Bouncy", by Shenseea from Alpha, 2022

== Sports ==
- Bounce (golf), a term referring to the shape of the head on certain golf clubs
- Bounce (jump), a type of fence in equestrian events
- Ball-up, or bounce, a method of restarting play in Australian rules football
- Running bounce, a skill in Australian rules
- The Bouncy, a sports celebration particularly associated with Rangers F.C.
- Bouncing ball, which is of interest to many ball sports
- Stone skipping, competitors bounce stones along the surface of water

== Technology ==
- Bounce (network), an internet networking term for masking connections, or sometimes a synonym for reset when applied as a verb to an internet server
- Bounce message, an automated message sent when e-mail delivery fails
- Bounce rate, the percentage of visitors who enter a website and "bounce" (leave the site) rather than continue viewing other pages within the same site
- Contact bounce, a common problem with mechanical switches and relays
- Ping pong recording technique, or bouncing, a method used in sound recording

== Other uses ==
- Bounce (banking), to tender a check for which one has non-sufficient funds, or the return of such a check
- Bounce (fabric softener), an American brand of fabric softener and other laundry sheets produced by Procter & Gamble
- Bounce, a dog owned by Alexander Pope
- Bounce, a slang for twerking

== See also ==
- Bouncer (disambiguation)
