= Manchester City F.C. in international football =

English club in international football

- Club: Manchester City
- Seasons played: 26
- Most appearances: Bernardo Silva (91)
- Top scorer: Sergio Agüero (43)
- First entry: 1968–69 European Cup
- Latest entry: 2026–27 UEFA Champions League

Titles
- Champions League: 1: 2022–23
- Cup Winners' Cup: 1: 1969–70
- Super Cup: 1: 2023
- FIFA Club World Cup: 1: 2023

Manchester City Football Club, an English professional association football club, has gained entry to Union of European Football Associations (UEFA) competitions on multiple occasions. They have represented England in the European Cup (now the Champions League) on sixteen occasions, the UEFA Cup (now the Europa League) on eight occasions, in the now-defunct Cup Winners' Cup twice, the UEFA Super Cup once, and at the FIFA Club World Cup twice. Manchester City are one of thirteen English football clubs to have won European and worldwide titles, in City's case the 1969–70 Cup Winners' Cup, 2022–23 Champions League, 2023 Super Cup and 2023 Club World Cup.

The club's first entry into European competition occurred in 1968, as a result of winning the Football League Championship. However, the participation was short-lived, as Manchester City suffered a surprise defeat at the hands of Fenerbahçe in the first round. Entry into the Cup Winners' Cup the following season was more successful; Manchester City won the competition, defeating Górnik Zabrze 2–1 in the final at the Prater Stadium in Vienna. The club reached the semi-finals of the same competition the following year, and continued to play European football regularly during the 1970s. City then endured a period of decline, and did not play in Europe again until 2003, a gap of 24 years. Since then, the Blues have qualified for European competition on a regular basis; they progressed past the quarter-final stage of a continental competition four times during that period, reaching the semi-finals of the 2015–16 and 2021–22 Champions League, losing their maiden European Cup final to Chelsea in 2020–21, and winning their first-ever European championship in 2022–23.

In the 1970s, Manchester City also had a track record of repeated entry into several of the non-UEFA sanctioned European competitions which were run in the era, including the Anglo-Italian League Cup and Texaco Cup.

== History ==
=== First entries into European competition ===
European club football competitions began in the mid-1950s. Though Manchester City were moderately successful domestically in this period, the club did not play in Europe. City were not invited to play in the Inter-Cities Fairs Cup, and the European Cup Winners' Cup did not begin until 1960. When eight players from neighbours Manchester United lost their lives in the Munich air disaster when returning from a European Cup match in February 1958, UEFA wished for City to take United's place in the competition. City rejected the idea out of hand.

Manchester City's first appearance in European competition occurred during the 1968–69 season. City played in the European Cup, by virtue of having won the 1967–68 league championship. Extroverted Manchester City coach Malcolm Allison made a number of grandiose statements predicting how the team would fare, saying that City would "terrify Europe", and that "City will attack these people as they have not been attacked since the days of the old Real Madrid". The opposition in the first round was Turkish club Fenerbahçe. The City management did not scout Fenerbahçe in advance of the game, opting to rely on a report from Oscar Hold, an Englishman who had managed Fenerbahçe between 1965 and 1967. In the first leg at Maine Road, City had what the Guardian's Albert Barham called "overwhelming territorial advantage". However, to the frustration of the home crowd City were denied by a strong defensive performance by Fenerbahçe, most notably by goalkeeper Yavuz Şimşek, and the match finished 0–0. The return leg in Istanbul was played in front of a Turkish record crowd. City took an early lead through Tony Coleman, but conceded two goals in the second half and were eliminated.

Manchester City won the 1969 FA Cup final to earn a place in the 1969–70 European Cup Winners' Cup. Their first tie was against Athletic Bilbao, in Spain's Basque Country. Athletic were themselves managed by an Englishman, Ronnie Allen. In the first leg, City recovered from a two-goal deficit to secure a 3–3 draw. The home leg was a comfortable 3–0 win. Post-match reports alleged that a scuffle had taken place at half-time between Mike Doyle and José Ramón Betzuen. The referee spoke to both managers, but did not take any further action.

In the second round, City travelled to Belgians Lierse S.K. and won the first leg 3–0, with two goals from Francis Lee and one from Colin Bell. The home leg produced a 5–0 win, a club record for European competition that stood until 2019. The first leg of the quarter-finals, at Académica de Coimbra, took place three days before Manchester City were due to play in the League Cup final. Malcolm Allison rejected the prevailing British football orthodoxy, in which domestic competitions took priority, by saying he would rather win in Portugal than in the League Cup final. The match finished goalless. At Maine Road, extra-time was required for Manchester City to break down the stubbornly defensive Coimbra. Tony Towers scored the only goal of the tie with a minute of extra-time remaining.

The draw for the semi-finals meant Manchester City played the away leg first in every round, this time in Germany, where Schalke 04 were the opposition. City lost the first leg by a single goal. Needing to win at Maine Road by at least two goals, the Blues used a very attacking approach. It worked; City led 3–0 at half-time and won the match 5–1. In the final, they faced Górnik Zabrze of Poland, who had progressed via a coin toss after three matches with A.S. Roma could not produce a winner in the other semi-final.

==== 1970 Cup Winners' Cup final ====
The final was held at a neutral venue, Prater Stadium in Vienna. The match took place in torrential rain, adversely affecting the attendance. The official figure was 7,968, though sources vary, with a number of figures between 7,968 and 15,000 reported. Of those, approximately 5,000 were Manchester City supporters. Owing to Soviet Bloc travel restrictions, only 300 supporters, relatives and officials were permitted to travel from communist Poland by its government.

Manchester City started the match strongly, particularly Francis Lee; The Guardian correspondent wrote "Lee, indefatigable and nigh irresistible continually embarrassed the Górnik defence in the early stages". Lee had the first chance of the match, a close range shot which was saved by goalkeeper Hubert Kostka. Manchester City took the lead in the 12th minute. Lee cut in from the left wing, escaping a tackle from Alfred Olek, and struck a fierce shot. Kostka parried the ball, only for it to land at the feet of Neil Young for a simple finish. Shortly after, City defender Mike Doyle sustained an ankle injury after colliding with Stefan Florenski. The Blues played on with ten men for a period as Doyle received treatment from trainer Dave Ewing, but the defender was unable to continue. Substitute Ian Bowyer replaced him. The change prompted an alteration in formation, in which Colin Bell switched to a deeper position. Shortly before half-time, Young won the ball after loose play from Florenski, which put him clear on goal. As Young moved into the penalty area, Kostka rushed out of his goal and upended him, leaving the referee no option but to give a penalty. Lee struck the spot-kick with power into the centre of the goal. Kostka's legs made contact with the ball, but the force of the shot carried it into the net to make it 2–0. Górnik got a goal back midway through the second half, but there were no more goals and the match finished 2–1.

After the match, City manager Joe Mercer said "the heavy rain in the second half ruined the game" and that he was "quite happy with the performance of our team, although the technical level was rather low in the second half". Górnik manager Michał Matyas blamed his side's poor start, saying the "first goal came too early for us and we never recovered from this shock". The trophy was Manchester City's fourth major honour in three seasons. It made them the third English club to win the Cup Winners' Cup, after Tottenham Hotspur and West Ham United.

=== Regular participation in the 1970s ===
As title holders, Manchester City automatically qualified to defend the Cup Winners' Cup in the 1970–71 season. Had they not won the trophy, they would still have been qualified for European competition, as City's victory in the 1970 League Cup granted a place in the Fairs Cup. As a UEFA-organised competition, the Cup Winners' Cup took precedence over the Fairs Cup, and so the club took a place in the former. In the first round, Manchester City almost suffered an upset at the hands of Linfield, from Belfast. City held a one-goal lead after the first leg, but Linfield twice took the lead in the second leg. The match finished 2–1 to Linfield, and Manchester City progressed on the away goals rule. Honvéd were the opposition in the second round. Manchester City won both legs, with the score being 3–0 on aggregate.

The quarter-finals saw a rematch with Górnik Zabrze, who City had beaten in the previous year's final. Both legs finished 2–0 to the home team, so to separate the sides a third match was played on neutral ground, in Copenhagen. Despite having several players unavailable through injury, City won this match 3–1, and were drawn to play fellow English club Chelsea in the semi-finals, the first time Manchester City had drawn another English club in European competition. Further injuries occurred in domestic fixtures in the run-up to the game, to the extent that goalkeeper Joe Corrigan played the first leg of the Chelsea tie unable to fully open his left eye because of a facial injury. City lost the first leg at Stamford Bridge 1–0. Corrigan was unable to play in the second leg, in which stand-in goalkeeper Ron Healey conceded an own goal, resulting in another 1–0 defeat.

A mid-table finish in the 1970–71 season meant that for the first time in four years Manchester City did not qualify for Europe. The following year, a fourth-place league finish gave the club a berth in the UEFA Cup for the first time. The UEFA Cup had replaced the Fairs Cup in 1971, when control of the competition transferred to UEFA. City's debut in the competition was a short one. Drawn against a Valencia side managed by Alfredo Di Stéfano, City were bounced out in the second leg at the Mestalla 3–2, despite producing a pulsating 2–2 draw at Maine Road in the first leg.

Triumph in the 1976 League Cup final gave Manchester City a place in the UEFA Cup after a four-year absence. City drew Juventus in the first round. Drawn at home first, City won the first leg 1–0, Brian Kidd scoring his first goal for the club. The second leg in Turin resulted in a 2–0 defeat and elimination. Juventus went on to win the competition. As league runners-up in the 1976–77 season, City again qualified for the UEFA Cup. Drawn against Widzew Łódź, the Blues drew the first leg at Maine Road 2–2. In the late 1970s, hooliganism was becoming a more prominent part of English football. Following an incident where a fan invaded the pitch and attacked Widzew's Zbigniew Boniek, City were fined by UEFA, and fencing was erected between the pitch and the stands. A 0–0 draw in Łódź resulted in City's elimination on the away goals rule.

A fifth-place finish in the 1977–78 season proved sufficient to qualify for the UEFA Cup once again. Dutchmen FC Twente were the first opposition. In Enschede, Dave Watson gave City the lead. Twente equalised in the second half from a free kick. In the second leg City ran up a 3–1 lead, but a second Twente goal meant a nervy finish. City held on, preserving their 3–2 lead to win the tie. This was the first time the club had progressed past the first round of the UEFA Cup in four attempts. Further opposition from the Low Countries awaited in the second round, in the form of Standard Liège. A flurry of late goals gave Manchester City a 4–0 lead after the first leg. The large lead meant that despite a 2–0 defeat in Liège, in which Gary Owen received a red card, City progressed with ease. Owen's sending off resulted in a five match ban.

In the third round City faced four-time European trophy winners A.C. Milan. The first leg, held at the San Siro, was initially postponed due to fog, and was instead played the following day. City took a 2–0 lead and came close to becoming the first English team to beat Milan at the San Siro, but conceded twice; the equaliser scored eight minutes from time. City won the home leg 3–0, with goals from Booth, Hartford and Kidd. City's first European quarter-final since 1971 was against Borussia Mönchengladbach. The club received advice from Bob Paisley, whose Liverpool had met Mönchengladbach several times. City opened the scoring in the first leg, but while attempting to extend their lead were caught on the counter-attack and conceded an equaliser. After failing to win the home leg, having conceded an away goal in the process, City travelled to Germany with few expecting them to progress. So it proved, as City lost 3–1 at the Bökelbergstadion.

=== Return to Europe in the 2000s; little progress in the early 2010s ===
Manchester City's fortunes declined during the 1980s and 1990s. For a single season, 1998–99, the club fell as far as English football's third tier. The club did not qualify for European competition in this period. In ordinary circumstances, the club's fifth-placed finish in 1991 and 1992 would have granted a UEFA Cup place. However, English clubs had recently returned from a ban issued after the Heysel Stadium disaster. As the UEFA coefficient that determines the number of places per country is based upon performances in European competition over the previous five years, England had a reduced allocation until 1995.

By the 2002–03 season, Manchester City were back in the Premier League. An unusual route into European competition for the 2003–04 season was provided by the UEFA Respect Fair Play ranking, which allocated extra UEFA Cup qualifying round places for the leagues with the best records for discipline and positive play. This marked Manchester City's first European participation for 24 years. In the qualifying round City played Welsh club Total Network Solutions. The first leg was the first-ever competitive match at Manchester City's new ground, the City of Manchester Stadium. Trevor Sinclair became the first ever goalscorer at the stadium in a 5–0 win. In the hope of attracting a large crowd, TNS switched the second leg to Millennium Stadium, the national stadium of Wales. With the tie effectively won, City made 10 changes to their team. The match finished 2–0 to City. Against Sporting Lokeren in the first round proper, City won the home leg 3–2, and the away leg 1–0. A tie against Groclin Dyskobolia followed. Both legs were drawn, and just as in 1976, City were eliminated on away goals after a 0–0 draw in Poland.

In 2008, Manchester City once again qualified for the UEFA Cup through the Fair Play rankings. As City had to play the qualifying rounds, it meant a very early start to the season, in mid-July. Their first match was a trip to the remote Faroe Islands to play EB/Streymur. As Streymur's ground had a capacity of only 1,000, the match was moved to Tórsvøllur, the Faroese national stadium. Two early goals gave City a 2–0 win. The home leg was unusual in that it was played outside Manchester. The pitch at the City of Manchester Stadium had been relaid following a Bon Jovi concert, and was not ready in time. Instead, the match was played at Barnsley's Oakwell ground. Another 2–0 win resulted in a 4–0 aggregate scoreline. In the second qualifying round City played FC Midtjylland. The first leg ended in a 1–0 defeat, only City's second ever home defeat in European competition. In the second leg City looked to be heading out of the competition until an 89th minute cross was diverted into his own net by Midtjylland's Danny Califf. The tie then went to extra time, and City progressed on penalties. In the first round proper Cypriots AC Omonia took the lead, but City overcame the deficit and won 2–1, and also won the second leg by the same scoreline.

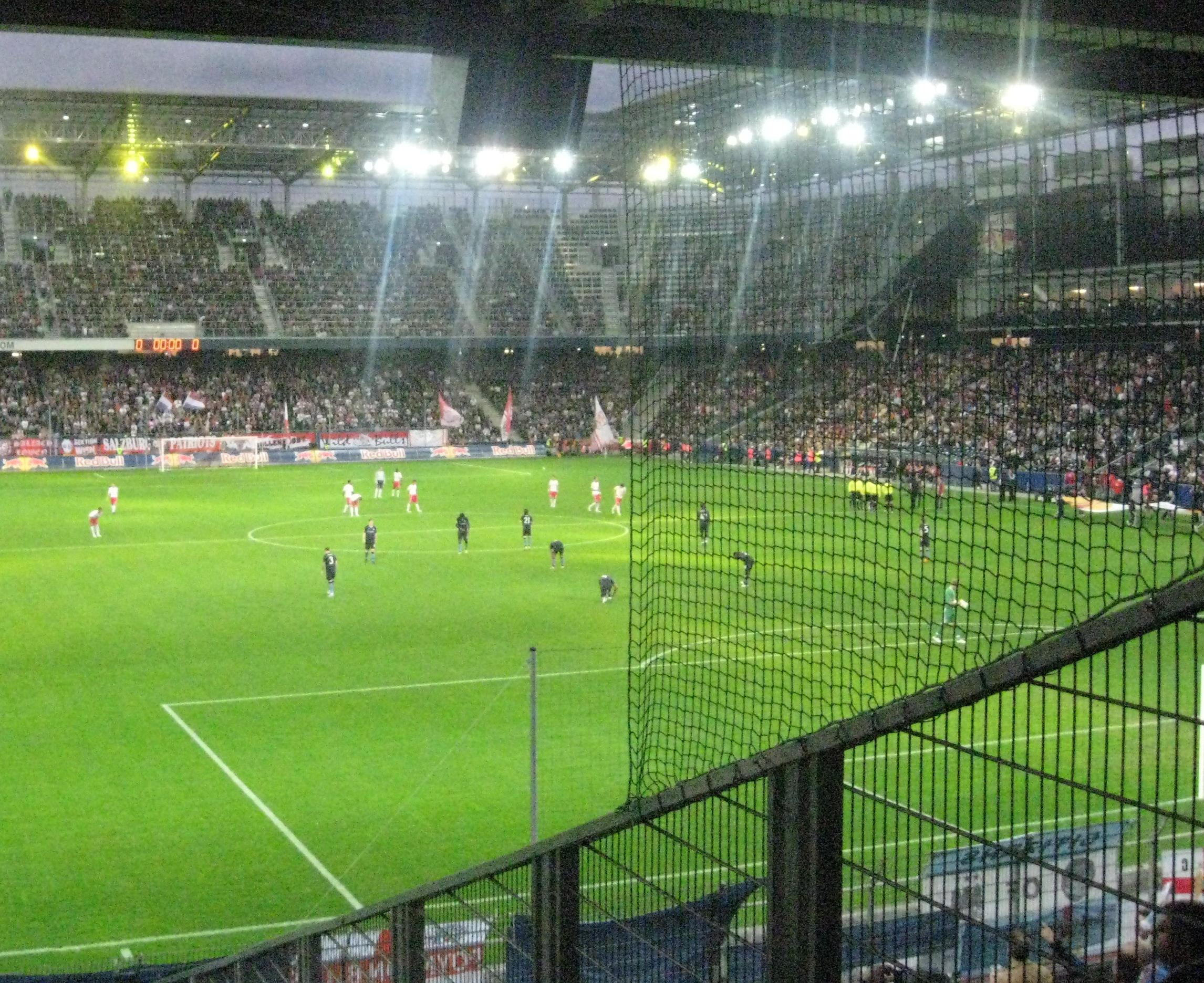
Manchester City prepare to kick off their 2010–11 Europa League match at Red Bull Salzburg

A five team group stage then followed, in which each team played the others once. Manchester City were drawn with Twente, Schalke 04, Racing de Santander and Paris Saint-Germain. City topped the group, after wins against Twente and Schalke, a draw with Paris Saint-Germain and a defeat in a dead rubber in Santander. The knockout stages then resumed, with a visit to F.C. Copenhagen in freezing conditions. City took the lead twice but could only draw 2–2. The home leg was more comfortable, and ended in a 2–1 victory. Another Danish club, Aalborg, awaited in the next round. Both matches finished 2–0 to the home side, and the tie was decided by a penalty shootout, which Manchester City won. City then faced Hamburger SV, in their first European quarter-final since 1979. The away leg was played first, and started exceptionally well for Manchester City, as Stephen Ireland scored after just 35 seconds. However, Hamburg soon equalised, and won the match 3–1. A difficult task in the home leg soon became even harder, when Hamburg scored an away goal early in the match. City scored twice, the first by Elano, who also hit the woodwork on two occasions with free-kicks. However, City could not produce the third goal that would have taken the tie into extra time.

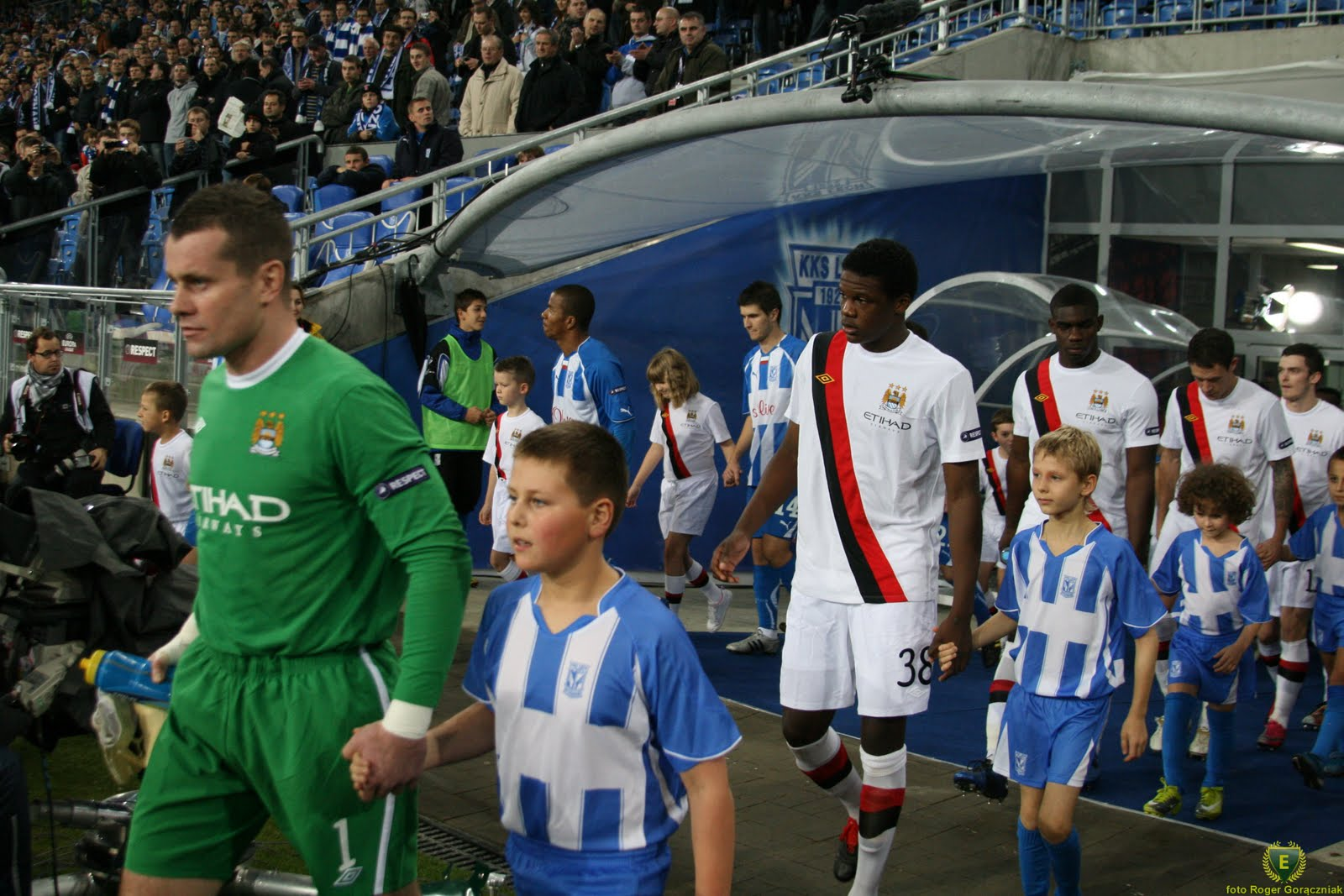
Lech Poznań vs Manchester City F.C., 4 November 2010

UEFA rebranded and restructured the UEFA Cup in 2009, resulting in it becoming the UEFA Europa League. By finishing fifth in the 2009–10 Premier League, Manchester City qualified for this competition. A play-off round took place before the four team group stage, in which Manchester City beat Timișoara of Romania home and away. City's group stage opponents were Juventus, Red Bull Salzburg and Lech Poznań. Each team played the others twice. City's opener was in Salzburg, and resulted in a 2–0 win. A 1–1 draw at home to Juventus then followed. A 3–1 win at home to Lech Poznań is remembered primarily not for the action on the pitch, in which Emmanuel Adebayor scored a hat-trick, but for the actions of the Polish supporters, whose backs to the pitch dance was later adopted by Manchester City fans, for whom it became known as The Poznań. The return match with Lech Poznań resulted in a 3–1 defeat, but a 3–0 home victory over Red Bull Salzburg ensured qualification with a match to spare. The dead rubber against Juventus ended 1–1, and Manchester City won the group. In the knockout stages City then beat Aris 3–0 on aggregate, and met Dynamo Kyiv in the last 16. City lost 2–0 in Kyiv, and had to play most of the second leg with ten men after Mario Balotelli was sent off. A 1–0 win was insufficient to overcome the deficit, as City lost 2–1 on aggregate.

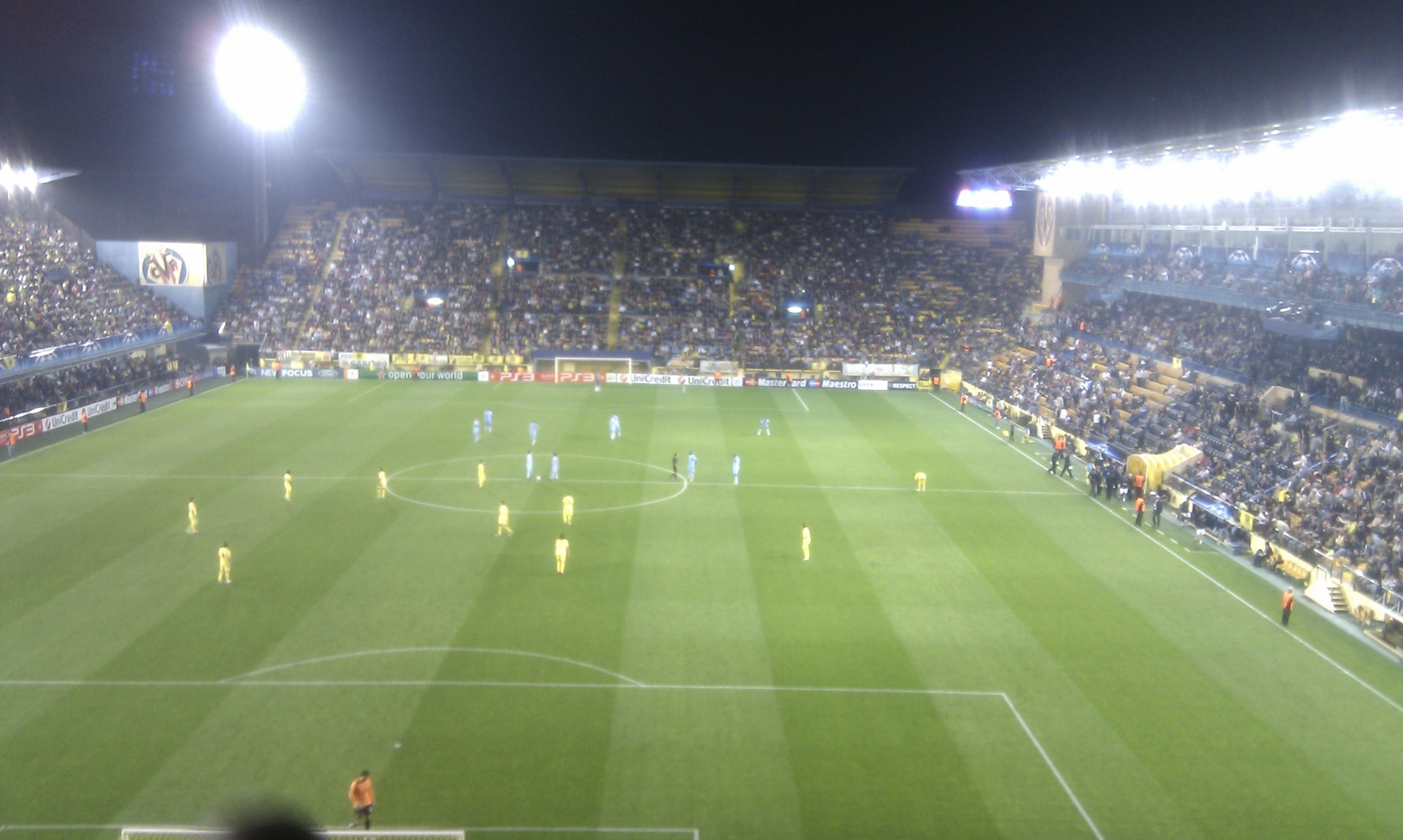
2011–12 match between Villarreal and Manchester City

Manchester City finished third in the 2010–11 Premier League, to qualify for the rebranded version of the European Cup, the UEFA Champions League, for the first time since 1968. The club's league finish granted direct entry into the group stages without qualification. Their group stage opponents were Bayern Munich, Villarreal and Napoli. City's first group match was at home to Napoli. The Italians took the lead in the second half following a counter-attacking move, but five minutes later Aleksandar Kolarov scored from a free-kick to equalise, and the match finished 1–1. City then lost 2–0 at Bayern Munich, a match most notable for the refusal of Carlos Tevez to come on as substitute, which resulted in an exile from the first team lasting nearly six months. A double-header with Villarreal resulted in two Manchester City wins. Sergio Agüero scored a last-minute winner in the first, which finished 2–1; the second was a comfortable 3–0 victory. A 2–1 defeat at Napoli then took qualification out of Manchester City's hands, and despite a 2–0 win against group winners Bayern Munich, City finished third in the group and failed to qualify for the knockout stages.

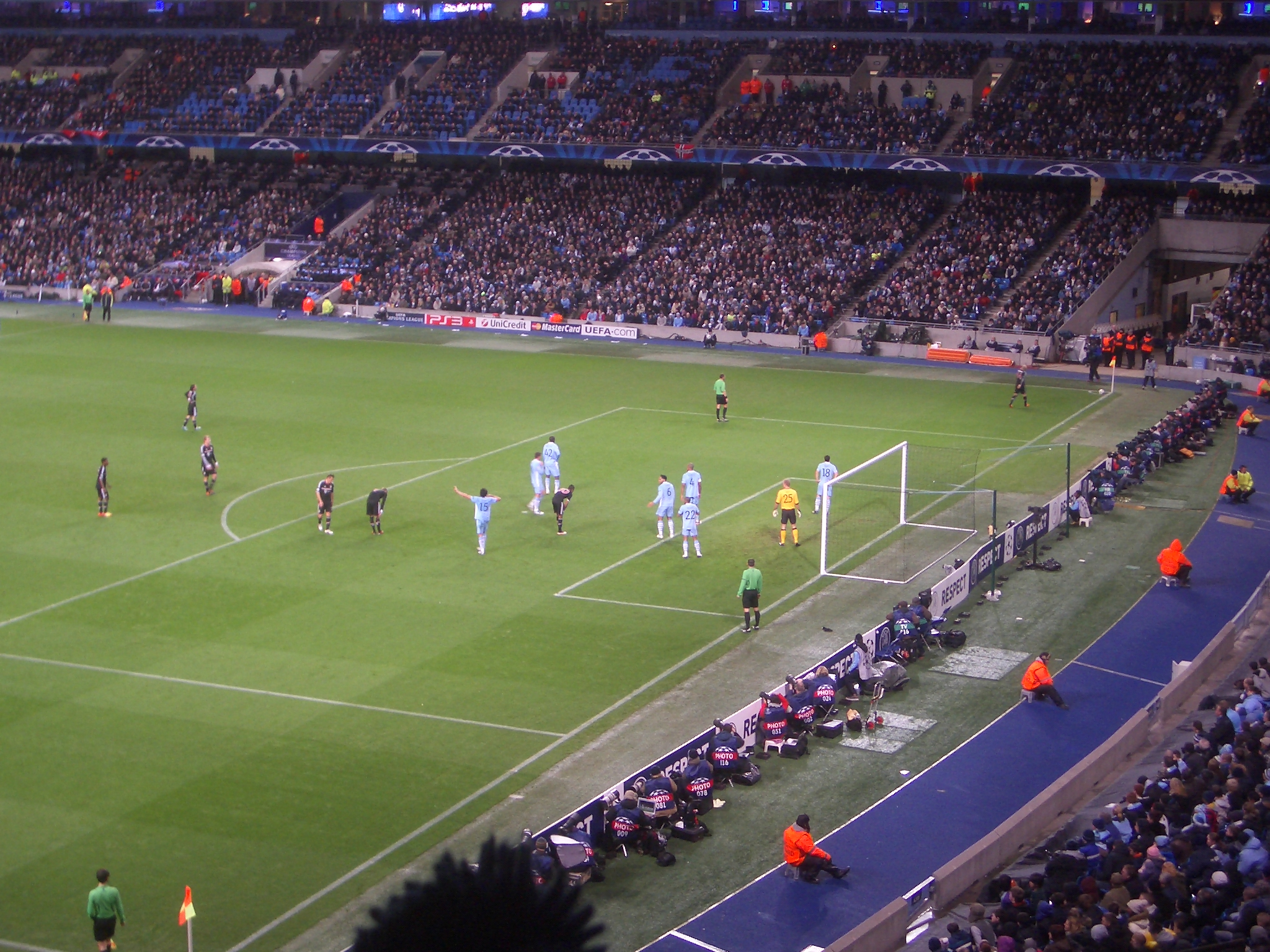
Manchester City vs Bayern Munich, 7 December 2011

As a third placed team the club then entered the Europa League in the round of 32, where they faced Europa League holders Porto. Manchester City won both legs. Agüero's goal after 19 seconds of the second leg was the second fastest in the history of the competition. City returned to Portugal in the next round, against Lisbon club Sporting CP. City lost the first leg 0–1 in Lisbon and were trailing 0–2 early in the home game. The team mounted a great comeback, scoring three goals, but it was not enough, as they were eliminated on away goals rule.

Manchester City qualified for the 2012–13 UEFA Champions League as league champions and hope were high for the team to perform successfully. The team was drawn with Real Madrid, Borussia Dortmund, and AFC Ajax. Cityzens failed to win even a single watch, losing three and drawing three and failed to progress even to the Europa League knock-out stage, finishing last in their group.

The 2013–14 UEFA Champions League campaign was a watershed moment for the team, as they won five games in the group stage and qualified for the knockout phase for the first time since 1968. However, City's performance in the round of 16 was a disappointment, as they dropped both games to Barcelona with an aggregate score of 1–4. The team's next Champions League campaign was similar to the previous one, as Manchester City were again drawn with Bayern Munich and CSKA Moscow in the group stage and, after qualifying for the playoffs as the second best team, Cityzens once again had to face Barcelona. The final result saw little improvement, as Man City again lost both games but this time with an aggregate score of 1–3. Barça went on to win the tournament.

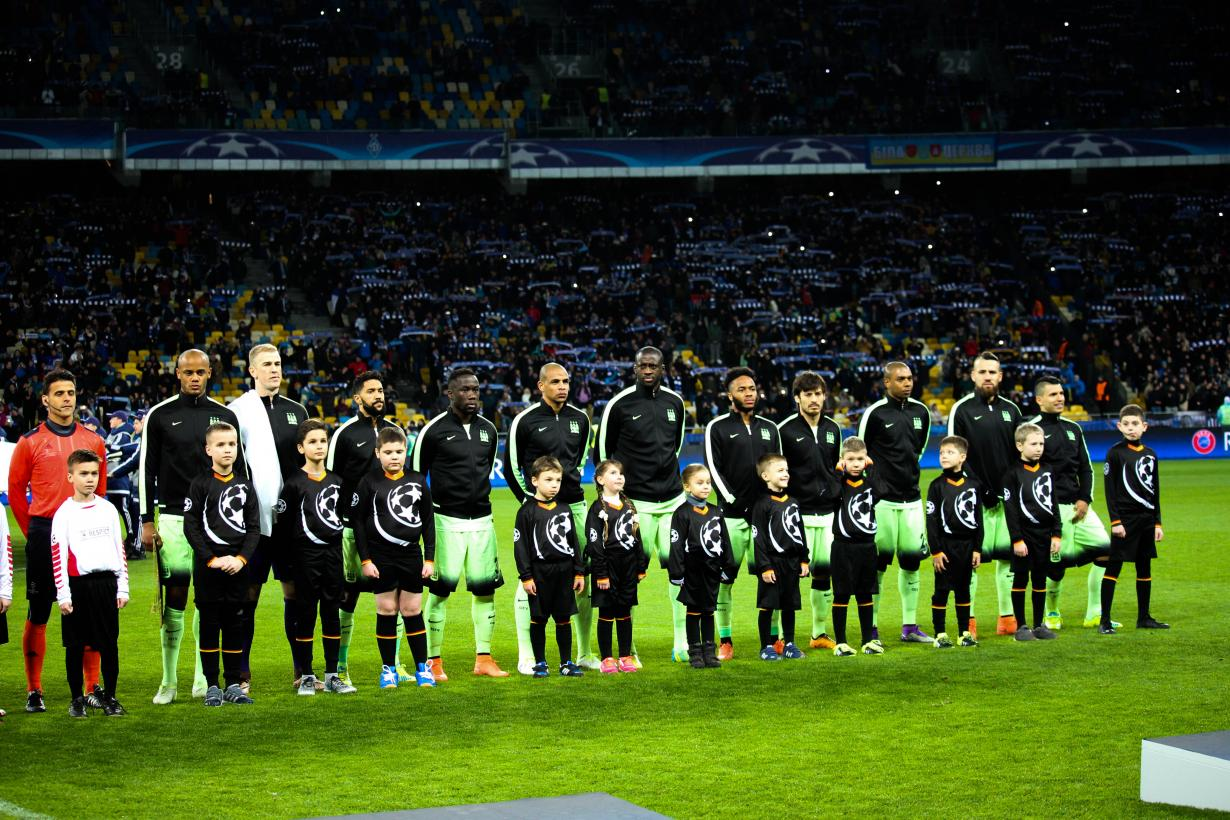
Manchester City line-up against Dynamo Kyiv in the UEFA Champions League, on 24 February 2016

The 2015–16 UEFA Champions League campaign went on to become the most successful in history for City as they reached the semi-finals before being eliminated by Real Madrid after drawing the home game and losing at the Santiago Bernabéu 0–1. Real Madrid went on to win the tournament. The Cityzens eliminated Dynamo Kyiv and Paris on their way to the semi-finals.

=== Under Pep Guardiola: 2016 to 2026, top-four UEFA ranking, first-ever Champions League final and continental treble ===
In the first season under the reign Pep Guardiola, Manchester City progressed to the knockout phase after finishing second in the group that featured Guardiola's former team, Barcelona. City lost their away match to Barça 0–4, but then rebounded to win 3–1 at home. In the Round of 16 City were drawn against Monaco. The Blues were trailing 1–2 and 2–3 in their home match before scoring three unanswered goals and winning 5–3. In the away game, the Cityzens were down 0–2 when Leroy Sané scored to put City in front of the tie again, but Tiémoué Bakayoko's late goal meant that Monaco progressed further and City were eliminated.

In 2017–18, Manchester City won the Premier League with 100 points. In their European campaign, the team won five games in the group stage and qualified for the knockout stage, where they defeated Basel 5–2 on aggregate. The Cityzens were drawn with fellow Premier League side Liverpool in the quarter-finals. City lost 5–1 on aggregate and were eliminated.

In the 2018–19 UEFA Champions League, City won their group with 13 points, then defeated Schalke 04 in the Round of 16, winning their home game with a record 7–0 scoreline. Against Tottenham Hotspur in the quarter-finals, they lost the away game 0–1, with Agüero missing a penalty. In the home leg, Sterling scored early for the hosts, but then City quickly conceded two goals and replied with three to lead 4–2 twenty minutes before the end of the game, but Fernando Llorente's wrongly awarded handball meant that City were again required to score. In stoppage time, Sterling converted a pass from Agüero to seemingly send City through, but the goal was disallowed after a VAR review, and the Blues were eliminated. Manchester City won all their domestic tournaments that season.

Acknowledging that City would be judged by their Champions League performance after all, Guardiola stated that the new season's main objective would be to win the European title. The Cityzens progressed to the knockout phase and faced old foes Real Madrid there. City won the away game 2–1, but the remainder of the tournament was indefinitely postponed due to the COVID-19 pandemic. Finally, UEFA announced that the tournament would be resumed in August 2020. The home match against Madrid was scheduled for 7 August. Thanks to goals from Raheem Sterling and Gabriel Jesus, the Citizens once again defeated Madrid 2–1, achieving a 4–2 victory on aggregate and advancing to the quarter-finals. City faced Lyon on 15 August, losing 3–1 and exiting the Champions League at the quarter-final stage for the third year in a row.

The 2020–21 campaign saw City top its group with a club record of 16 points, twice defeating Marseille and Olympiacos, and collecting four points against Porto. In the round of 16, the Blues were paired with Borussia Mönchengladbach and progressed to the quarter-finals for the fourth consecutive year after winning both legs 2–0. In the quarter-finals, City were paired against another German outfit, this time Borussia Dortmund. The Blues managed to neutralize Dortmund's inform striker Erling Haaland to win the double-legged tie 4–2 on aggregate after two identical 2–1 wins home and away. In the semi-finals, Manchester City were drawn against reigning finalists Paris Saint-Germain who'd avenged their loss to Bayern Munich in the 2020 final by knocking out the German club in their quarter-final tie on away goals. City rallied from behind to win 2–1 at the Parc des Princes thanks to goals by Kevin De Bruyne and Riyad Mahrez. In the second leg, a goal in either half from Mahrez booked City's place in their first-ever European Cup final, which happened to be an all-English affair against Chelsea, with a 4–1 aggregate victory. The final took place at the Estádio do Dragão in Porto, Portugal, and the Citizens were defeated 1–0 by a lone goal scored by Kai Havertz. Still, City's breakthrough marked their most successful European campaign to date. As a consequence of that successful campaign, City entered the top four in the UEFA rankings, placing third.

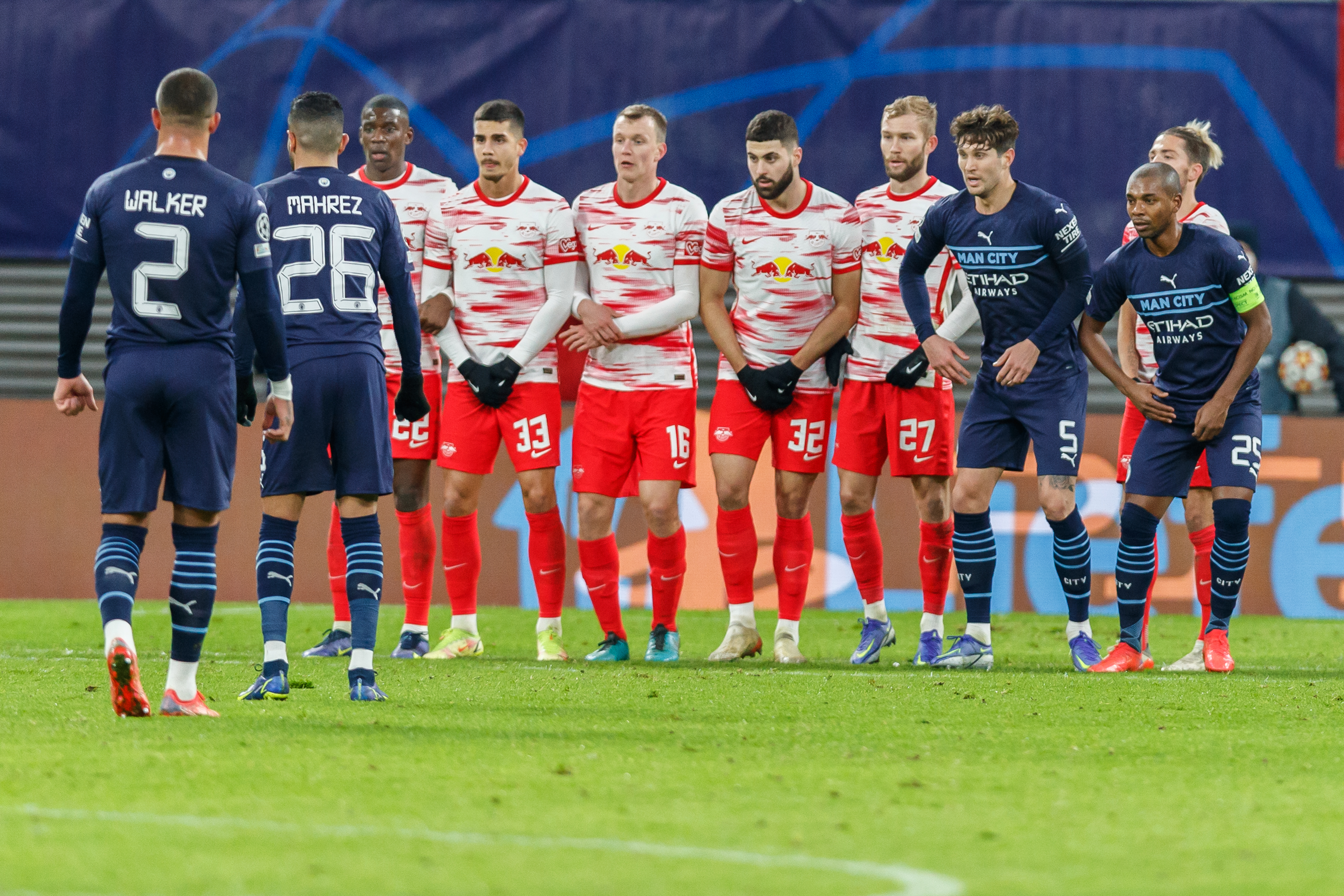
Manchester City against RB Leipzig, 7 December 2021

City once again reached the Champions League semi-finals in the 2021–22 competition. They won a group including Paris Sant Germain, RB Leipzig and Club Brugges with four victories and two defeats. In the round of 16 they earnt a commanding first leg lead in their tie against Sporting CP, beating the Portuguese champions 5–0 away including two goals from Bernardo Silva. before wrapping up the victory with a 0–0 draw at home. In the quarter-final a 1–0 victory in the first leg at home gave City a slight advantage against Atlético Madrid as they headed to Madrid. A 0–0 draw then ensured City progressed to the semi-finals. There, City beat Real Madrid 4–3 i to take a slender advantage to the Bernabéu. City scored in under two minutes as Kevin De Bruyne finished the fastest goal in European Cup semi-final history and had held a two-goal advantage on three occasions during the tie, but Real Madrid limited them to a 4–3 win with goals from Karim Benzema. City led the second leg 1–0 (5–3 on aggregate), from a 75th-minute goal from Riyad Mahrez, but two late goals in a minute from Madrid's substitute striker Rodrygo sent the game into extra time; and another penalty from Benzema five minutes later proved to be the winner as City were defeated 1–3 (5–6 on aggregate). D City retained the third place in the UEFA rankings.

For the third consecutive season, and for the fourth time in the club's history, City reached the Champions League semi-finals in 2022–23. After topping their group of Borussia Dortmund of the Bundesliga, Sevilla of La Liga and F.C. Copenhagen of the Danish Superliga undefeated, with four wins and two draws, the Blues were drawn up against RB Leipzig in the round of 16 for the third and fourth fixtures between the sides in their histories. At the Red Bull Arena, Riyad Mahrez's first half opener was cancelled out by Joško Gvardiol in the second half, and City drew 1–1 after being denied a penalty in the final seconds. City defeated the German side 7–0 in the second leg, with a record-equalling five goals from Erling Haaland, and one each from new captain İlkay Gündoğan and from Kevin De Bruyne. The Blues would then be drawn up against another Bundesliga side, this time Bayern Munich, reigning German champions. In the first leg at the Etihad Stadium, City won 3–0, with a first Champions League goal for Rodri and one each from Bernardo Silva and Erling Haaland. The following week, they drew 1–1 at the Allianz Arena, with another goal from Haaland confirming City's semi-finals spot 4–1 on aggregate to face Real Madrid there for the second consecutive season. The first leg was played at the Santiago Bernabéu Stadium, and Vinícius Júnior gave Madrid a 1–0 lead at half time. However, City's Kevin De Bruyne equalised for a 1–1 draw. Manchester City sealed their spot in the final with a 4–0 win in the second leg at the Etihad Stadium, with a first-half brace from Bernardo Silva, and second-half goals from Manuel Akanji and Julián Álvarez.

==== 2023 Champions League final ====
On 10 June 2023, at the Atatürk Olympic Stadium in front of 71,412 supporters, a second-half goal from Rodri saw Manchester City win the Champions League final against Inter Milan, completing a historic continental treble, only the second in English men's football history. In doing so, City completed a task of winning the UEFA Champions League set out 15 years ago in 2008 when the club was purchased by the Abu Dhabi United Group. In the fifth minute, Bernardo Silva curled an effort just wide. Erling Haaland and Kevin De Bruyne both had efforts, but they were saved by Inter goalkeeper André Onana. In the 36th minute, De Bruyne was substituted due to injury. In the 59th minute, City's keeper Ederson failed to collect a backpass from Manuel Akanji which was found by Inter's Lautaro Martínez; his shot from near the touchline was blocked by Ederson. Rodri scored the opening goal for City in the 68th minute by finishing a pulled-back pass that Bernardo Silva sent from near the goal to the top of the penalty area. Inter had a chance to equalise three minutes later through a header by defender Federico Dimarco that hit the crossbar. Dimarco tried to capitalise on the rebound as well, but his shot was blocked by teammate Romelu Lukaku. The Belgian striker had his own chance to score from a close-range header in the 89th minute, which Ederson blocked with his legs. The Brazilian made an additional save in stoppage time off Robin Gosens' header to preserve a 1–0 victory for City. With this being the club's first European Cup title (making them the first new winners of the competition since fellow English club Chelsea in 2012), City became the sixth English team, and 23rd overall, to win the European Cup, which also marked the 15th time an English club were European champions. With this triumph, Manchester City topped the UEFA coefficient rankings.

==== 2023–2026 ====
In August 2023, City won the UEFA Super Cup for the first time in their history, defeating Sevilla 5–4 on penalties after a 1–1 draw in Athens. Later that year, the club travelled to Saudi Arabia to participate in the FIFA Club World Cup, prevailing over Fluminense 4–0 in the final. This was City's first triumph in the competition, making them world champions at club level.

Manchester City's defence of their European crown in the 2023–24 UEFA Champions League began strongly, as they won all six of their group stage matches. However, they were eliminated in the quarter-finals by Real Madrid, losing on penalties after a 4–4 aggregate draw across the two legs. Despite falling short of back-to-back titles, the campaign underlined their consistency in European competition.

The 2024–25 season saw City struggle to perform in the new league format and they were once again eliminated by Real Madrid in the play-off round for the last 16, failing to reach that stage for the first time since 2012–13.

The Blues qualified for the expanded 2025 FIFA Club World Cup in the United States by virtue of winning the 2022–23 UEFA Champions League. The tournament was the first to feature 32 teams. City were drawn into Group G alongside Juventus, Al Ain FC and Wydad AC. They began their campaign with a 2–0 victory over Wydad AC, followed by a 6–0 win against Al Aind. City's final group match saw them beat Juventus 5–2, with Erling Haaland among the scorers, ensuring they topped the group with a perfect record of three wins from three. In the knockout phase, Manchester City faced Saudi Arabian champions Al-Hilal. Bernardo Silva gave City an early lead, but two quick goals from Marcos Leonardo and Malcom early in the second half put Al-Hilal ahead. Haaland equalised before full-time, sending the match into extra time. Extra time saw Kalidou Koulibaly restore Al-Hilal's advantage, with Phil Foden responding for City. However, Marcos Leonardo scored his second goal in the 112th minute to seal a 4–3 win for Al-Hilal and eliminate City from the tournament at the round of 16 stage. The defeat was considered one of the shocks of the competition, as City had dominated their group stage matches and were widely regarded as favourites. Manager Pep Guardiola described the elimination as "a pity" but emphasised the need for recovery and reflection after a long season.

In September 2025, Erling Haaland became the fastest player to reach 50 goals in the UEFA Champions League, having achieved the milestone in just 49 appearances during a 2–0 victory against Napoli on Matchday 1 of the 2025–26 UEFA Champions League.

Pep Guardiola left the club at the end of the 2026 season, after a third consecutive year where City had been eliminated from European competition by Real Madrid. This time in the round of 16, despite having beaten them in Madrid in the league phase.

== UEFA and FIFA competitions ==
Manchester City results in UEFA & FIFA competition
Season	Competition	Qualification method	Round	Opposition	Home	Away	Neutral
1968–69	European Cup	First Division, Champions	First round	(Turkey) Fenerbahçe	0–0	1–2	—
1969–70	European Cup Winners' Cup	FA Cup Winners	First round	(Spain) Athletic Bilbao	3–0	3–3	—
1969–70	European Cup Winners' Cup	FA Cup Winners	Second round	(Belgium) Lierse	5–0	3–0	—
1969–70	European Cup Winners' Cup	FA Cup Winners	Quarter-final	(Portugal) Académica de Coimbra	1–0 (a.e.t.)	0–0	—
1969–70	European Cup Winners' Cup	FA Cup Winners	Semi-final	(West Germany) Schalke 04	5–1	0–1	—
1969–70	European Cup Winners' Cup	FA Cup Winners	Final	(Poland) Górnik Zabrze	—	—	2–1
1970–71	European Cup Winners' Cup	Cup Winners' Cup Winners	First round	(Northern Ireland) Linfield	1–0	1–2	—
1970–71	European Cup Winners' Cup	Cup Winners' Cup Winners	Second round	(Hungary) Budapest Honvéd SE	2–0	1–0	—
1970–71	European Cup Winners' Cup	Cup Winners' Cup Winners	Quarter-final	(Poland) Górnik Zabrze	2–0 (a.e.t.)	0–2	3–1
1970–71	European Cup Winners' Cup	Cup Winners' Cup Winners	Semi-final	(England) Chelsea	0–1	0–1	—
1972–73	UEFA Cup	First Division, 4th	First round	(Spain) Valencia	2–2	1–2	—
1976–77	UEFA Cup	League Cup Winners	First round	(Italy) Juventus	1–0	0–2	—
1977–78	UEFA Cup	First Division, Runners-up	First round	(Poland) Widzew Łódź	2–2	0–0 (a)	—
1978–79	UEFA Cup	First Division, 4th	First round	(Netherlands) Twente	3–2	1–1	—
1978–79	UEFA Cup	First Division, 4th	Second round	(Belgium) Standard Liège	4–0	0–2	—
1978–79	UEFA Cup	First Division, 4th	Third round	(Italy) Milan	3–0	2–2	—
1978–79	UEFA Cup	First Division, 4th	Quarter-final	(West Germany) Borussia Mönchengladbach	2–2	1–3	—
2003–04	UEFA Cup	UEFA Fair Play Entry	Qualifying round	(Wales) Total Network Solutions	5–0	2–0	—
2003–04	UEFA Cup	UEFA Fair Play Entry	First round	(Belgium) Sporting Lokeren	3–2	1–0	—
2003–04	UEFA Cup	UEFA Fair Play Entry	Second round	(Poland) Dyskobolia Grodzisk	1–1	0–0 (a)	—
2008–09	UEFA Cup	UEFA Fair Play Entry	First qualifying round	(Faroe Islands) EB/Streymur	2–0	2–0	—
2008–09	UEFA Cup	UEFA Fair Play Entry	Second qualifying round	(Denmark) Midtjylland	0–1	1–0 (a.e.t.) (4–2 p)	—
2008–09	UEFA Cup	UEFA Fair Play Entry	First round	(Cyprus) Omonia	2–1	2–1	—
2008–09	UEFA Cup	UEFA Fair Play Entry	Group stage	(Netherlands) Twente	3–2	—	—
2008–09	UEFA Cup	UEFA Fair Play Entry	Group stage	(Germany) Schalke 04	—	2–0	—
2008–09	UEFA Cup	UEFA Fair Play Entry	Group stage	(France) Paris Saint-Germain	0–0	—	—
2008–09	UEFA Cup	UEFA Fair Play Entry	Group stage	(Spain) Racing Santander	—	1–3	—
2008–09	UEFA Cup	UEFA Fair Play Entry	Round of 32	(Denmark) Copenhagen	2–1	2–2	—
2008–09	UEFA Cup	UEFA Fair Play Entry	Round of 16	(Denmark) Aalborg BK	2–0	0–2 (a.e.t.) (4–3 p)	—
2008–09	UEFA Cup	UEFA Fair Play Entry	Quarter-final	(Germany) Hamburger SV	2–1	1–3	—
2010–11	Europa League	Premier League, 5th	Play-off round	(Romania) Timișoara	2–0	1–0	—
2010–11	Europa League	Premier League, 5th	Group stage	(Austria) Red Bull Salzburg	3–0	2–0	—
2010–11	Europa League	Premier League, 5th	Group stage	(Italy) Juventus	1–1	1–1	—
2010–11	Europa League	Premier League, 5th	Group stage	(Poland) Lech Poznań	3–1	1–3	—
2010–11	Europa League	Premier League, 5th	Round of 32	(Greece) Aris	3–0	0–0	—
2010–11	Europa League	Premier League, 5th	Round of 16	(Ukraine) Dynamo Kyiv	1–0	0–2	—
2011–12	Champions League	Premier League, 3rd	Group A	(Italy) Napoli	1–1	1–2	—
2011–12	Champions League	Premier League, 3rd	Group A	(Germany) Bayern Munich	2–0	0–2	—
2011–12	Champions League	Premier League, 3rd	Group A	(Spain) Villarreal	2–1	3–0	—
2011–12	Europa League	Champions League Group Stage, 3rd	Round of 32	(Portugal) Porto	4–0	2–1	—
2011–12	Europa League	Champions League Group Stage, 3rd	Round of 16	(Portugal) Sporting CP	3–2 (a)	0–1	—
2012–13	Champions League	Premier League, Champions	Group D	(Spain) Real Madrid	1–1	2–3	—
2012–13	Champions League	Premier League, Champions	Group D	(Germany) Borussia Dortmund	1–1	0–1	—
2012–13	Champions League	Premier League, Champions	Group D	(Netherlands) Ajax	2–2	1–3	—
2013–14	Champions League	Premier League, Runners-up	Group D	(Czech Republic) Viktoria Plzeň	4–2	3–0	—
2013–14	Champions League	Premier League, Runners-up	Group D	(Germany) Bayern Munich	1–3	3–2	—
2013–14	Champions League	Premier League, Runners-up	Group D	(Russia) CSKA Moscow	5–2	2–1	—
2013–14	Champions League	Premier League, Runners-up	Round of 16	(Spain) Barcelona	0–2	1–2	—
2014–15	Champions League	Premier League, Champions	Group E	(Germany) Bayern Munich	3–2	0–1	—
2014–15	Champions League	Premier League, Champions	Group E	(Italy) Roma	1–1	2–0	—
2014–15	Champions League	Premier League, Champions	Group E	(Russia) CSKA Moscow	1–2	2–2	—
2014–15	Champions League	Premier League, Champions	Round of 16	(Spain) Barcelona	1–2	0–1	—
2015–16	Champions League	Premier League, Runners-up	Group D	(Italy) Juventus	1–2	0–1	—
2015–16	Champions League	Premier League, Runners-up	Group D	(Germany) Borussia Mönchengladbach	4–2	2–1	—
2015–16	Champions League	Premier League, Runners-up	Group D	(Spain) Sevilla	2–1	3–1	—
2015–16	Champions League	Premier League, Runners-up	Round of 16	(Ukraine) Dynamo Kyiv	0–0	3–1	—
2015–16	Champions League	Premier League, Runners-up	Quarter-final	(France) Paris Saint-Germain	1–0	2–2	—
2015–16	Champions League	Premier League, Runners-up	Semi-final	(Spain) Real Madrid	0–0	0–1	—
2016–17	Champions League	Premier League, 4th	Play-off round	(Romania) Steaua București	1–0	5–0	—
2016–17	Champions League	Premier League, 4th	Group C	(Spain) Barcelona	3–1	0–4	—
2016–17	Champions League	Premier League, 4th	Group C	(Germany) Borussia Mönchengladbach	4–0	1–1	—
2016–17	Champions League	Premier League, 4th	Group C	(Scotland) Celtic	1–1	3–3	—
2016–17	Champions League	Premier League, 4th	Round of 16	(France) Monaco	5–3	1–3 (a)	—
2017–18	Champions League	Premier League, 3rd	Group F	(Ukraine) Shakhtar Donetsk	2–0	1–2	—
2017–18	Champions League	Premier League, 3rd	Group F	(Italy) Napoli	2–1	4–2	—
2017–18	Champions League	Premier League, 3rd	Group F	(Netherlands) Feyenoord	1–0	4–0	—
2017–18	Champions League	Premier League, 3rd	Round of 16	(Switzerland) Basel	1–2	4–0	—
2017–18	Champions League	Premier League, 3rd	Quarter-final	(England) Liverpool	1–2	0–3	—
2018–19	Champions League	Premier League, Champions	Group F	(France) Lyon	1–2	2–2	—
2018–19	Champions League	Premier League, Champions	Group F	(Germany) TSG Hoffenheim	2–1	2–1	—
2018–19	Champions League	Premier League, Champions	Group F	(Ukraine) Shakhtar Donetsk	6–0	3–0	—
2018–19	Champions League	Premier League, Champions	Round of 16	(Germany) Schalke 04	7–0	3–2	—
2018–19	Champions League	Premier League, Champions	Quarter-final	(England) Tottenham Hotspur	4–3 (a)	0–1	—
2019–20 (Note: On 17 June 2020, UEFA announced that the final stages of that season's Champions League would feature a format change due to the COVID-19 pandemic in Europe. As such, the quarter-finals, semi-finals and final were all played behind closed doors in a single-leg format from 12 to 23 August 2020 at the Estádio da Luz and Estádio José Alvalade in Lisbon, Portugal.)	Champions League	Premier League, Champions	Group C	(Ukraine) Shakhtar Donetsk	1–1	3–0	—
2019–20	Champions League	Premier League, Champions	Group C	(Croatia) Dinamo Zagreb	2–0	4–1	—
2019–20	Champions League	Premier League, Champions	Group C	(Italy) Atalanta	5–1	1–1	—
2019–20	Champions League	Premier League, Champions	Round of 16	(Spain) Real Madrid	2–1	2–1	—
2019–20	Champions League	Premier League, Champions	Quarter-final	(France) Lyon	—	—	1–3
2020–21	Champions League	Premier League, Runners-up	Group C	(Portugal) Porto	3–1	0–0	—
2020–21	Champions League	Premier League, Runners-up	Group C	(Greece) Olympiacos	3–0	1–0	—
2020–21	Champions League	Premier League, Runners-up	Group C	(France) Marseille	3–0	3–0	—
2020–21	Champions League	Premier League, Runners-up	Round of 16	(Germany) Borussia Mönchengladbach	2–0	2–0	—
2020–21	Champions League	Premier League, Runners-up	Quarter-final	(Germany) Borussia Dortmund	2–1	2–1	—
2020–21	Champions League	Premier League, Runners-up	Semi-final	(France) Paris Saint-Germain	2–0	2–1	—
2020–21	Champions League	Premier League, Runners-up	Final	(England) Chelsea	—	—	0–1
2021–22	Champions League	Premier League, Champions	Group A	(Germany) RB Leipzig	6–3	1–2	—
2021–22	Champions League	Premier League, Champions	Group A	(France) Paris Saint-Germain	2–1	0–2	—
2021–22	Champions League	Premier League, Champions	Group A	(Belgium) Club Brugge	4–1	5–1	—
2021–22	Champions League	Premier League, Champions	Round of 16	(Portugal) Sporting CP	0–0	5–0	—
2021–22	Champions League	Premier League, Champions	Quarter-final	(Spain) Atlético Madrid	1–0	0–0	—
2021–22	Champions League	Premier League, Champions	Semi-final	(Spain) Real Madrid	4–3	1–3 (a.e.t.)	—
2022–23	Champions League	Premier League, Champions	Group G	(Spain) Sevilla	3–1	4–0	—
2022–23	Champions League	Premier League, Champions	Group G	(Germany) Borussia Dortmund	2–1	0–0	—
2022–23	Champions League	Premier League, Champions	Group G	(Denmark) Copenhagen	5–0	0–0	—
2022–23	Champions League	Premier League, Champions	Round of 16	(Germany) RB Leipzig	7–0	1–1	—
2022–23	Champions League	Premier League, Champions	Quarter-final	(Germany) Bayern Munich	3–0	1–1	—
2022–23	Champions League	Premier League, Champions	Semi-final	(Spain) Real Madrid	4–0	1–1	–
2022–23	Champions League	Premier League, Champions	Final	(Italy) Inter Milan	—	—	1–0
2023	UEFA Super Cup	Champions League, Winners	Final	(Spain) Sevilla	—	—	1–1 (5–4 p)
2023	FIFA Club World Cup	Champions League, Winners	Semi-final	(Japan) Urawa Red Diamonds	—	—	3–0
2023	FIFA Club World Cup	Champions League, Winners	Final	(Brazil) Fluminense	—	—	4–0
2023–24	Champions League	Premier League, Champions Champions League, Winners	Group G	(Serbia) Red Star Belgrade	3–1	3–2	—
2023–24	Champions League	Premier League, Champions Champions League, Winners	Group G	(Germany) RB Leipzig	3–2	3–1	—
2023–24	Champions League	Premier League, Champions Champions League, Winners	Group G	(Switzerland) Young Boys	3–0	3–1	—
2023–24	Champions League	Premier League, Champions Champions League, Winners	Round of 16	(Denmark) Copenhagen	3–1	3–1	—
2023–24	Champions League	Premier League, Champions Champions League, Winners	Quarter-final	(Spain) Real Madrid	1–1 (a.e.t.) (3–4 p)	3–3	–
2024–25	Champions League	Premier League, Champions	League phase	(Italy) Inter Milan	0–0	—	—
2024–25	Champions League	Premier League, Champions	League phase	(Slovakia) Slovan Bratislava	—	4–0	—
2024–25	Champions League	Premier League, Champions	League phase	(Czech Republic) Sparta Prague	5–0	—	—
2024–25	Champions League	Premier League, Champions	League phase	(Portugal) Sporting CP	—	1–4	—
2024–25	Champions League	Premier League, Champions	League phase	(Netherlands) Feyenoord	3–3	—	—
2024–25	Champions League	Premier League, Champions	League phase	(Italy) Juventus	—	0–2	—
2024–25	Champions League	Premier League, Champions	League phase	(France) Paris Saint-Germain	—	2–4	—
2024–25	Champions League	Premier League, Champions	League phase	(Belgium) Club Brugge	3–1	—	—
2024–25	Champions League	Premier League, Champions	Knockout phase play-offs	(Spain) Real Madrid	2–3	1–3	–
2025	FIFA Club World Cup	Champions League, Winners	Group G	(Morocco) Wydad AC	—	—	2–0
2025	FIFA Club World Cup	Champions League, Winners	Group G	(United Arab Emirates) Al Ain	—	—	6–0
2025	FIFA Club World Cup	Champions League, Winners	Group G	(Italy) Juventus	—	—	5–2
2025	FIFA Club World Cup	Champions League, Winners	Round of 16	(Saudi Arabia) Al-Hilal	—	—	3–4 (a.e.t.)
2025–26	Champions League	Premier League, 3rd	League phase	(Italy) Napoli	2–0	—	—
2025–26	Champions League	Premier League, 3rd	League phase	(France) Monaco	—	2–2	—
2025–26	Champions League	Premier League, 3rd	League phase	(Spain) Villarreal	—	2–0	—
2025–26	Champions League	Premier League, 3rd	League phase	(Germany) Borussia Dortmund	4–1	—	—
2025–26	Champions League	Premier League, 3rd	League phase	(Germany) Bayer Leverkusen	0–2	—	—
2025–26	Champions League	Premier League, 3rd	League phase	(Spain) Real Madrid	—	2–1	—
2025–26	Champions League	Premier League, 3rd	League phase	(Norway) Bodø/Glimt	—	1–3	—
2025–26	Champions League	Premier League, 3rd	League phase	(Turkey) Galatasaray	2–0	—	—
2025–26	Champions League	Premier League, 3rd	Round of 16	(Spain) Real Madrid	1–2	0–3	—
2026–27	Champions League	Premier League, Runners-up	League phase	(Portugal) Porto	—	2–0	—
2026–27	Champions League	Premier League, Runners-up	League phase	(France) Paris Saint-Germain	2–4	—	—
2026–27	Champions League	Premier League, Runners-up	League phase	(Greece) AEK Athens	5–1	—	—
2026–27	Champions League	Premier League, Runners-up	League phase	(Germany) RB Leipzig	—	3–2	—
2026–27	Champions League	Premier League, Runners-up	League phase	(Italy) Napoli	24 Nov.	—	—
2026–27	Champions League	Premier League, Runners-up	League phase	(Spain) Barcelona	—	8 Dec.	—
2026–27	Champions League	Premier League, Runners-up	League phase	(France) Lens	—	20 Jan.	—
2026–27	Champions League	Premier League, Runners-up	League phase	(Portugal) Sporting CP	27 Jan.	—	—

== Non-UEFA / FIFA competitions ==
In addition to the major UEFA competitions, Manchester City have also played a number of first team fixtures in other, more minor multi-national competitions. As winners of the 1970 League Cup, Manchester City played against the Coppa Italia winners Bologna in the Anglo-Italian League Cup. The competition started the previous year, as a way of enabling 1969 League Cup winners Swindon Town to play European opposition. For the first leg in Bologna, the City team stayed over 100 km (60 miles) away in the coastal resort of Rimini, and took a relaxed attitude to proceedings. City lost the match 1–0, and drew 2–2 at home, losing the competition.

After missing out on a UEFA berth for 1971–72, Manchester City were invited to play in the Texaco Cup, a competition for English, Scottish and Irish teams. City fielded a weakened side for the second leg of their tie against Airdrieonians. As punishment Manchester City had their £1,000 prize money withheld and were banned from the competition for two years. Upon the expiry of the suspension in 1974, the club entered the competition again, but exited in the group stage. The tournament saw Denis Law play his final matches as a professional. The withdrawal of Irish teams saw the competition renamed the Anglo-Scottish Cup the following year. Again, City failed to progress beyond the group stage.

Manchester City results in non-UEFA competition
Season	Competition	Qualification method	Round	Opposition	Home	Away
1970–71	Anglo-Italian League Cup	League Cup Winners	Final	(Italy) Bologna	2–2	0–1
1971–72	Texaco Cup	Invitation	First round	(Scotland) Airdrieonians	2–2	0–2
1974–75	Texaco Cup	Invitation	Group stage	(England) Blackpool	—	1–1
1974–75	Texaco Cup	Invitation	Group stage	(England) Sheffield United	—	2–4
1974–75	Texaco Cup	Invitation	Group stage	(England) Oldham Athletic	2–1	—
1975–76	Anglo-Scottish Cup	Invitation	Group stage	(England) Blackpool	—	0–1
1975–76	Anglo-Scottish Cup	Invitation	Group stage	(England) Blackburn Rovers	—	0–1
1975–76	Anglo-Scottish Cup	Invitation	Group stage	(England) Sheffield United	3–1	—

== Records ==
As of 4 November 2026 (Note: Champions League figures include results from preliminary round matches.)

=== Competitive record ===
Competition	T	Part	Pld	W	D	L	GF	GA	GD	Win%
European Cup / UEFA Champions League	1	17	153	85	29	39	322	185	+137	55.56
European Cup Winners' Cup	1	2	18	11	2	5	32	13	+19	61.11
UEFA Cup / Europa League	0	8	52	28	13	11	85	52	+33	53.85
UEFA Super Cup	1	1	1	0	1	0	1	1	+0	0.00
FIFA Club World Cup	1	2	6	5	0	1	23	6	+17	83.33
Total	4	30	**228**	**128**	**45**	**55**	**459**	**253**	**+206**	**56.14**

Competition	T	Part	Pld	W	D	L	GF	GA	GD	Win%
Non-UEFA competitions
Anglo-Italian League Cup	0	1	2	0	1	1	2	3	−1	0.00
Texaco Cup / Anglo-Scottish Cup	0	3	8	2	2	4	10	13	−3	25.00
Total	0	4	**10**	**2**	**3**	**5**	**12**	**16**	**−4**	**20.00**

=== Finals ===
29 April 1970 Final	**Manchester City (England)**	**2–1**	**(Poland) Górnik Zabrze**	Vienna, Austria
19:30	Young 12'; Lee 43' (pen.)	Report	Oślizło 68'	Stadium: Praterstadion; Attendance: 7,968; Referee: Paul Schiller (Austria)

29 May 2021 Final	**Manchester City (England)**	**0–1**	**(England) Chelsea**	Porto, Portugal
20:00 WEST PTT (UTC+1)	Gündoğan (yellow card) 35'; Gabriel Jesus (yellow card) 88'	Report	Havertz 42'; Rüdiger (yellow card) 57'	Stadium: Estádio do Dragão; Attendance: 14,110; Referee: Antonio Mateu Lahoz (Spain)
Note: The final was originally scheduled to be played at the Atatürk Olympic Stadium in Istanbul. However, on 12 May, UEFA announced it had been moved to Portugal since the high level of COVID-19 infection rates in Turkey had led the UK government to place travel to Turkey on its red list, meaning fans would have had to quarantine for ten days in a hotel at their expense after their return. Portugal at the same time was on the green list, which meant no travel restrictions at either end for those attending the final.

10 June 2023 Final	**Manchester City (England)**	**1–0**	**(Italy) Inter Milan**	Istanbul, Turkey
22:00 TRT (UTC+3)	Rodri 68'; Haaland (yellow card) 90+2'; Ederson (yellow card) 90+4'	Report	Barella (yellow card) 59'; Lukaku (yellow card) 83'; Onana (yellow card) 90+2'	Stadium: Atatürk Olympic Stadium; Attendance: 71,412; Referee: Szymon Marciniak (Poland)

16 August 2023 Final	**Manchester City (England)**	**1–1** (**5–4** p)	**(Spain) Sevilla**	Piraeus, Greece
22:00 UTC+3	Palmer 63'	Report	En-Nesyri 25'; Badé (yellow card) 33'; Lamela (yellow card) 62'; Juanlu (yellow card) 90'	Stadium: Karaiskakis Stadium; Attendance: 29,207; Referee: François Letexier (France)
	**Penalties**
	Haaland (penalty scored); Alvarez (penalty scored); Kovačić (penalty scored); Grealish (penalty scored); Walker (penalty scored)		(penalty scored) Ocampos; (penalty scored) Mir; (penalty scored) Rakitić; (penalty scored) Montiel; (penalty missed) Gudelj

22 December 2023 Final	**Manchester City (England)**	**4–0**	**(Brazil) Fluminense**	Jeddah, Saudi Arabia
21:00 SAST	Alvarez 1', 88'; Nino 27' (o.g.); Foden 72'	Report	Marcelo (yellow card) 57'; Alexsander (yellow card) 68'; John Kennedy (yellow card) 84'	Stadium: King Abdullah Sports City; Attendance: 52,601; Referee: Szymon Marciniak (Poland)

=== Lost semi-finals ===
**Year**	**Competition**	**Opposing Team**	**Agg Score**	**Final venue**	**Other Semi-finalists***
1970–71	Cup Winners' Cup	(England) **Chelsea**	0–2	(Greece) Karaiskakis Stadium	(Netherlands) PSV Eindhoven (Spain) Real Madrid
2015–16	Champions League	(Spain) **Real Madrid**	0–1	(Italy) San Siro	(Spain) Atlético Madrid (Germany) Bayern Munich
2021–22	Champions League	(Spain) **Real Madrid**	5–6 (a.e.t.)	Stade de France	(Spain) Villarreal (England) Liverpool

*Other winning semi-finalists are shown in italics. Tournaments winners are in bold.

=== By country ===
==== UEFA and FIFA competitions ====
Result summary by country
Country	Teams	Pld	W	D	L	GF	GA	GD
Austria	1	2	2	0	0	5	0	+5
Belgium	4	9	8	0	1	28	7	+21
Brazil	1	1	1	0	0	4	0	+4
Croatia	1	2	2	0	0	6	1	+5
Cyprus	1	2	2	0	0	4	2	+2
Czech Republic	2	3	3	0	0	12	2	+10
Denmark	3	10	6	2	2	18	8	+10
England	3	7	1	0	6	5	12	−7
Faroe Islands	1	2	2	0	0	4	0	+4
France	4	17	7	4	6	31	29	+2
Germany (incl. West Germany)	8	40	25	6	9	90	49	+41
Greece	3	5	4	1	0	12	1	+11
Hungary	1	2	2	0	0	3	0	+3
Italy	6	21	9	7	5	34	12	+22
Japan	1	1	1	0	0	3	0	+3
Morocco	1	1	1	0	0	2	0	+2
Netherlands	3	8	4	3	1	18	13	+5
Northern Ireland	1	2	1	0	1	2	2	0
Norway	1	1	0	0	1	1	3	−2
Poland	4	10	4	4	2	14	11	+3
Portugal	3	12	7	3	2	21	9	+11
Romania	2	4	4	0	0	9	0	+9
Russia	1	4	2	1	1	10	7	+3
Saudi Arabia	1	1	0	0	1	3	4	−1
Scotland	1	2	0	2	0	4	4	0
Serbia	1	2	2	0	0	6	3	+3
Slovakia	1	1	1	0	0	4	0	+4
Spain	8	38	15	9	14	63	57	+6
Switzerland	2	4	3	0	1	11	3	+5
Turkey	2	3	1	1	1	3	2	+1
Ukraine	2	10	6	2	2	20	6	+14
United Arab Emirates	1	1	1	0	0	6	0	+6
Wales	1	2	2	0	0	7	0	+7

==== Non-UEFA competitions ====
Result summary by country (Non-UEFA competitions)
Country	Pld	W	D	L	GF	GA	GD
England	6	2	1	3	8	9	−1
Italy	2	0	1	1	2	3	−1
Scotland	2	0	1	1	2	4	−2

=== By club ===
Manchester City have played against 76 different clubs internationally.

Record in international football by team
Club	Country	Pld	W	D	L	GF	GA	GD	Win%
AaB	Denmark	2	1	0	1	2	2	+0	50.00
Académica de Coimbra	Portugal	2	1	1	0	1	0	+1	50.00
AEK Athens	Greece	1	1	0	0	5	1	+4	100.00
Ajax	Netherlands	2	0	1	1	3	5	−2	0.00
Al Ain	United Arab Emirates	1	1	0	0	6	0	+6	100.00
Al-Hilal	Saudi Arabia	1	0	0	1	3	4	−1	0.00
Aris	Greece	2	1	1	0	3	0	+3	50.00
Atalanta	Italy	2	1	1	0	6	2	+4	50.00
Athletic Bilbao	Spain	2	1	1	0	6	3	+3	50.00
Atlético Madrid	Spain	2	1	1	0	1	0	+1	50.00
Barcelona	Spain	6	1	0	5	5	12	−7	16.67
Basel	Switzerland	2	1	0	1	5	2	+3	50.00
Bayer Leverkusen	Germany	1	0	0	1	0	2	−2	0.00
Bayern Munich	Germany	8	4	1	3	13	11	+2	50.00
Bodø/Glimt	Norway	1	0	0	1	1	3	−2	0.00
Borussia Dortmund	Germany	7	4	2	1	11	6	+5	57.14
Borussia Mönchengladbach	Germany	8	5	2	1	18	9	+9	62.50
Budapest Honvéd	Hungary	2	2	0	0	3	0	+3	100.00
CSKA Moscow	Russia	4	2	1	1	10	7	+3	50.00
Celtic	Scotland	2	0	2	0	4	4	+0	0.00
Chelsea	England	3	0	0	3	0	3	−3	0.00
Club Brugge	Belgium	3	3	0	0	12	3	+9	100.00
Copenhagen	Denmark	6	4	2	0	15	5	+10	66.67
Dinamo Zagreb	Croatia	2	2	0	0	6	1	+5	100.00
Dynamo Kyiv	Ukraine	4	2	1	1	4	3	+1	50.00
Dyskobolia Grodzisk Wielkopolski	Poland	2	0	2	0	1	1	+0	0.00
EB/Streymur	Faroe Islands	2	2	0	0	4	0	+4	100.00
Fenerbahçe	Turkey	2	0	1	1	1	2	−1	0.00
Feyenoord	Netherlands	3	2	1	0	8	3	+5	66.67
Fluminense	Brazil	1	1	0	0	4	0	+4	100.00
Galatasaray	Turkey	1	1	0	0	2	0	+2	100.00
Górnik Zabrze	Poland	4	3	0	1	7	4	+3	75.00
Hamburger SV	Germany	2	1	0	1	3	4	−1	50.00
TSG Hoffenheim	Germany	2	2	0	0	4	2	+2	100.00
Inter Milan	Italy	2	1	1	0	1	0	+1	50.00
Juventus	Italy	8	2	2	4	9	11	−2	25.00
Lech Poznań	Poland	2	1	0	1	4	4	+0	50.00
Lierse	Belgium	2	2	0	0	8	0	+8	100.00
Linfield	Northern Ireland	2	1	0	1	2	2	+0	50.00
Liverpool	England	2	0	0	2	1	5	−4	0.00
Lyon	France	3	0	1	2	4	7	−3	0.00
Marseille	France	2	2	0	0	6	0	+6	100.00
Midtjylland	Denmark	2	1	0	1	1	1	+0	50.00
Milan	Italy	2	1	1	0	5	2	+3	50.00
Monaco	France	3	1	1	1	8	8	+0	33.33
Napoli	Italy	5	3	1	1	10	6	+4	60.00
Olympiacos	Greece	2	2	0	0	4	0	+4	100.00
Omonia	Cyprus	2	2	0	0	4	2	+2	100.00
Paris Saint-Germain	France	9	4	2	3	13	14	−1	44.44
Porto	Portugal	5	4	1	0	11	2	+9	80.00
RB Leipzig	Germany	7	5	1	1	24	11	+13	71.43
Racing Santander	Spain	1	0	0	1	1	3	−2	0.00
Real Madrid	Spain	17	5	5	7	27	30	−3	29.41
Red Bull Salzburg	Austria	2	2	0	0	5	0	+5	100.00
Red Star Belgrade	Serbia	2	2	0	0	6	3	+3	100.00
Roma	Italy	2	1	1	0	3	1	+2	50.00
Schalke 04	Germany	5	4	0	1	17	4	+13	80.00
Sevilla	Spain	5	4	1	0	13	4	+9	80.00
Shakhtar Donetsk	Ukraine	6	4	1	1	16	3	+13	66.67
Slovan Bratislava	Slovakia	1	1	0	0	4	0	+4	100.00
Sparta Prague	Czechia	1	1	0	0	5	0	+5	100.00
Sporting CP	Portugal	5	2	1	2	9	7	+2	40.00
Sporting Lokeren	Belgium	2	2	0	0	4	2	+2	100.00
Standard Liège	Belgium	2	1	0	1	4	2	+2	50.00
Steaua București	Romania	2	2	0	0	6	0	+6	100.00
Timișoara	Romania	2	2	0	0	3	0	+3	100.00
Total Network Solutions	Wales	2	2	0	0	7	0	+7	100.00
Tottenham Hotspur	England	2	1	0	1	4	4	+0	50.00
Twente	Netherlands	3	2	1	0	7	5	+2	66.67
Urawa Red Diamonds	Japan	1	1	0	0	3	0	+3	100.00
Valencia	Spain	2	0	1	1	3	4	−1	0.00
Viktoria Plzeň	Czech Republic	2	2	0	0	7	2	+5	100.00
Villarreal	Spain	3	3	0	0	7	1	+6	100.00
Widzew Łódź	Poland	2	0	2	0	2	2	+0	0.00
Wydad AC	Morocco	1	1	0	0	2	0	+2	100.00
Young Boys	Switzerland	2	2	0	0	6	1	+5	100.00

=== UEFA coefficient ===
The UEFA club coefficients are based on the results of clubs competing in the five previous seasons of the UEFA Champions League, UEFA Europa League and UEFA Europa Conference League. The rankings determine the seeding of each club in relevant UEFA competition draws. The table and graph below show the progress of City's rankings in these coefficients since they re-entered the Europa League competition in 2010–11 as of the end of the season specified.

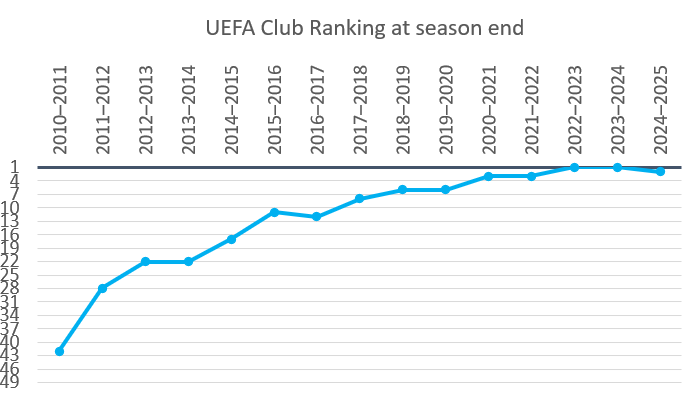
Graph showing Manchester City's progression in the UEFA rankings

**Season**	**Coefficient**	**Ranking**
2010–11	30	42
2011–12	47	28
2012–13	54	22
2013–14	56	22
2014–15	71	17
2015–16	84	11
2016–17	85	12
2017–18	100	8
2018–19	106	6
2019–20	116	6
2020–21	125	3
2021–22	134	3
2022–23	145	1
2023–24	148	1
2024–25	138	2
2025–26	125.5	6

Last updated: 30 May 2026.
Source: UEFA
Final coefficient at season end indicated.

=== Club records ===
- Record European home victory: **7–0** vs Schalke 04, UEFA Champions League round of 16 second leg, 12 March 2019; vs RB Leipzig, UEFA Champions League round of 16 second leg, 14 March 2023.
- Record European away victory: **5–0** vs Sporting CP, UEFA Champions League round of 16 first leg, 15 February 2022.
- Record European home defeat: **1–3** vs Bayern Munich, UEFA Champions League group stage, 2 October 2013; **0–2** vs Bayer Leverkusen, UEFA Champions League league phase, 25 November 2025; **2–4** vs Paris Saint-Germain, UEFA Champions League league phase, 14 October 2026.
- Record European away defeat: **0–4** vs Barcelona, UEFA Champions League group stage, 19 October 2016.
- Record FIFA Club World Cup victory: **6–0** vs Al Ain, group stage, 22 June 2025.
- Record FIFA Club World Cup defeat: **3–4** vs Al-Hilal, round of 16, 30 June 2025.
- Longest winning run in UEFA competitions: **10 matches**, 17 May 2023 – 6 March 2024, **national record**.
- Most UEFA Champions League home wins in a row: **12 matches**, 9 March 2022 – 6 March 2024.
- Most UEFA Champions League wins in a single season: **11 matches**, 2020–21, **national record**.
- Longest unbeaten run in the UEFA Champions League: **26 matches**, 6 September 2022 – 23 October 2024, **national record**.
- Longest unbeaten home run in the UEFA Champions League: **35 matches**, 7 November 2018 – 29 January 2025, **national record**.
- Longest unbeaten away run in the UEFA Champions League: **13 matches**, 6 September 2022 – 1 October 2024.
- Most points amassed in a UEFA Champions League group: **18 points**, 2023–24.
- Fewest points amassed in a UEFA Champions League group: **3 points**, 2012–13.
- Most points amassed in a UEFA Champions League league phase: **16 points**, 2025–26.
- Fewest points amassed in a UEFA Champions League league phase: **11 points**, 2024–25.
- Highest final position in a UEFA Champions League league phase: **8th**, 2025–26.
- Lowest final position in a UEFA Champions League league phase: **22nd**, 2024–25.
- Most goals scored in a single season: **32 goals**, 2022–23.
- Fewest goals conceded in a single season: **5 goals**, 2020–21 and 2022–23.
- Highest home attendance: **60,021** vs Paris Saint-Germain, UEFA Champions League league phase, 14 October 2026.

=== Player records ===
- Most appearances: **91** – Bernardo Silva.
- Most goals scored in international competitions: **43** – Sergio Agüero.
- Most goals scored in the UEFA Champions League: **39** – Sergio Agüero.
  - Most goals scored in the play-off round: **3** – Sergio Agüero.
  - Most goals scored in the group stage / league phase: **28** – Erling Haaland.
  - Most goals scored in the knockout phase: **13** – Kevin De Bruyne.
  - Most goals scored in a single season: **12** – Erling Haaland, 2022–23.
  - Most hat-tricks scored: **3** – Sergio Agüero.
  - Most hat-tricks in a single season: **2** – Sergio Agüero, 2016–17.
  - Most goals scored in a single match: **5** – Erling Haaland vs RB Leipzig, 2022–23.
- Most assists: **29** – Kevin De Bruyne.
- Most assists in a single season: **7** – Kevin De Bruyne, 2022–23.
- Most assists in a single match: **3** – Kevin De Bruyne vs Tottenham Hotspur, UEFA Champions League, 17 April 2019; João Cancelo vs Club Brugge, UEFA Champions League, 3 November 2021.
- Most clean sheets: **31** – Ederson.

=== Manager records ===
- Most decorated managers: **3 titles** – Pep Guardiola.
- Most matches managed: **114 matches** (including preliminary rounds) – Pep Guardiola.
- Most matches won: **70** **wins** (including preliminary rounds) – Pep Guardiola.
