= Paul Hince =

English footballer (1945–2023)

Personal information
- Full name: Paul Frank Hince
- Date of birth: 2 March 1945
- Place of birth: Manchester, England
- Date of death: 22 July 2023 (aged 78)
- Position: Winger

Senior career*
Years	Team	Apps	(Gls)
1966–1968	Manchester City	7	(4)
1968–1969	Charlton Athletic	23	(2)
1969–1970	Bury	38	(3)
1970–1971	Crewe Alexandra	48	(5)
1971–1972	Macclesfield Town	36	(2)
Total		130	(13)
- * Club domestic league appearances and goals

Paul Frank Hince (2 March 1945 – 22 July 2023) was an English footballer who played as a winger in the Football League. He played for the Division One championship-winning Manchester City side in 1967–68. Hince was one of four players retrospectively awarded a winner's medal in 2021, having not been eligible under the rules at the time.

== Biography ==
Paul Hince was a reporter with the Ashton-under-Lyne Reporter Group before commencing his football career at Old Trafford, but achieved most success scoring four goals and playing eleven games at cross town rivals Manchester City during the Mercer-Allison partnership in the 1967–68 season. On retiring from the game Paul went back to journalism working for the Manchester Evening News as the City correspondent where he frequently referred to City as "God's own Club," and later became the Chief Sportswriter and England correspondent. After a long illness living with dementia Hince died at home on 22 July 2023, at the age of 78. Despite rumours of being in a care home for the last few years, Hince was cared for at home by his wife and stepson until the end.
