= Alan Ogley =

English footballer

Personal information
- Date of birth: 4 February 1946 (age 80)
- Place of birth: Darton, England
- Height: 5 ft 10 in (1.78 m)
- Position: Goalkeeper

Senior career*
| Years | Team | Apps | (Gls) |
| 1962–1963 | Barnsley | 9 | (0) |
| 1963–1967 | Manchester City | 51 | (0) |
| 1967–1975 | Stockport County | 240 | (0) |
| 1975–1977 | Darlington | 80 | (0) |
| Total | | 380 | (0) |
- * Club domestic league appearances and goals

Alan Ogley is a footballer who played as a goalkeeper in the Football League for Barnsley, Manchester City, Stockport County and Darlington. Ogley was a member of the Barnsley Boys’ Football team who in 1961 won the English Schools Shield. He also played seven times for the England Schools U15 team in 1960-61 and was a member of the England Youth squad in 1963.

He played for the Division One championship-winning side in 1967–68, although he only made 2 appearances as third choice behind Ken Mulhearn and Harry Dowd. He was succeeded by Reuben Noble-Lazarus on 30 September 2008 at being the youngest player to debut in the English Football League.
