= The Bouncy =

Sports celebration

The Bouncy or The Bouncy Bouncy is a sports celebration which involves jumping up and down on the spot while chanting the word "bouncy" or "Let's all do the bouncy" over and over again. It is mainly done by fans of Scottish association football club Rangers and the Northern Ireland national football team. The Bouncy was first performed in 1984 as a terrace song at Rangers' home ground Ibrox Stadium. In 1990, the then Rangers head of security, Alistair Hood jokingly suggested that Ibrox Stadium should have seatbelts installed to stop fans doing The Bouncy. The action was brought to the attention of a wider audience when Rangers fans were seen doing it in the City of Manchester Stadium in the 2008 UEFA Cup Final against Zenit St Petersburg.

== Safety concerns ==
Doing the Bouncy is not normally considered dangerous; however, in 2007, Rangers fans were warned not to do the Bouncy on the Glasgow Subway by the Strathclyde Partnership for Transport owing to fears that doing it on-board might derail trains. The Strathclyde Partnership for Transport said that it might close the Ibrox subway station on match days if fans did not stop doing The Bouncy on the trains.

== Controversy ==
In 2007, journalist Gerry McNee asserted, in a News of the World article, that The Bouncy referred to the murder of Robert Hamill in Northern Ireland in 1997. The allegation precipitated complaints, mainly from the Rangers Supporters Trust which called McNee's story "a disgraceful slur" and called for him to publicly apologise. The Rangers Supporters Trust also called for McNee and the News of the World to be banned from going to press conferences at Ibrox if the paper did not print an apology.

== See also ==
- The Poznań
