= Harry Dowd =

English footballer

Personal information
- Full name: Henry William Dowd
- Date of birth: 4 July 1938
- Place of birth: Salford, England
- Date of death: 7 April 2015 (aged 76)
- Position: Goalkeeper

Senior career*
Years	Team	Apps	(Gls)
1961–1970	Manchester City	181	(1)
1969–1970	→ Stoke City (loan)	3	(0)
1970–1974	Oldham Athletic	121	(0)
–	Northwich Victoria		
Total		305	(1)
- * Club domestic league appearances and goals

Henry William Dowd (4 July 1938 – 7 April 2015) was an English football goalkeeper who played for Manchester City, Stoke City and Oldham Athletic.

== Career ==
At the start of his career Dowd combined amateur football playing for ICI Blackley with a job as a plumber. On 10 January 1958 he signed for Manchester City as an amateur, and turned professional two years later. In December 1961 he made his debut in a 4–1 defeat to Blackburn Rovers, deputising for the injured Bert Trautmann. In the 1961–62 season he established himself as first choice goalkeeper, making 34 appearances. In February 1964, Dowd broke his finger in a game against Bury. Unable to continue playing in goal, he moved to centre-forward, where he scored the equalising goal.

During Manchester City's championship winning 1967–68 season, Dowd lost his first team place through injury to Ken Mulhearn, and made only seven first team appearances therefore missing out on a League Championship Medal under the rules then in place. He regained his place the following season, and played on the winning side in the 1969 FA Cup final, where Manchester City beat Leicester City 1–0.

In the 1969–70 season, Dowd lost his first team place again, this time to Joe Corrigan and so the spent two months on loan at Stoke City being used as cover for Gordon Banks, making three appearances for the "Potters". His final Manchester City appearance was against Sheffield Wednesday in the final match of 1969–70, and in December 1970 he was transferred to Oldham Athletic, where he played 111 times. Dowd died on 7 April 2015 at the age of 76.

== Career statistics ==
Appearances and goals by club, season and competition
Club	Season	League			FA Cup		League Cup		Total	
Club	Season	Division	Apps	Goals	Apps	Goals	Apps	Goals	Apps	Goals
Manchester City	1961–62	First Division	2	0	0	0	0	0	2	0
Manchester City	1962–63	First Division	27	0	3	0	4	0	34	0
Manchester City	1963–64	Second Division	32	1	1	0	6	0	39	1
Manchester City	1964–65	Second Division	21	0	2	0	1	0	24	0
Manchester City	1965–66	Second Division	38	0	8	0	1	0	47	0
Manchester City	1966–67	First Division	25	0	1	0	2	0	28	0
Manchester City	1967–68	First Division	7	0	0	0	2	0	9	0
Manchester City	1968–69	First Division	27	0	7	0	0	0	34	0
Manchester City	1969–70	First Division	2	0	0	0	0	0	2	0
Manchester City	Total		181	1	22	0	16	0	219	1
Stoke City (loan)	1969–70	First Division	3	0	0	0	0	0	3	0
Stoke City (loan)	Total		3	0	0	0	0	0	3	0
Oldham Athletic	1970–71	Fourth Division	24	0	0	0	0	0	24	0
Oldham Athletic	1971–72	Third Division	40	0	1	0	2	0	43	0
Oldham Athletic	1972–73	Third Division	37	0	0	0	1	0	38	0
Oldham Athletic	1973–74	Third Division	20	0	4	0	2	0	26	0
Oldham Athletic	Total		121	0	5	0	5	0	131	0
Career total			305	1	27	0	21	0	353	1

== Honours ==
Manchester City

- Football League First Division: 1967–68
- Football League Second Division: 1965–66
- FA Cup: 1968–69
