= Ken Mulhearn =

English footballer (1945–2018)

Personal information
- Full name: Kenneth John Mulhearn
- Date of birth: 16 October 1945
- Place of birth: Liverpool, England
- Date of death: 13 March 2018 (aged 72)
- Height: 6 ft 0 in (1.83 m)
- Position: Goalkeeper

Youth career
- Everton

Senior career*
Years	Team	Apps	(Gls)
1964–1967	Stockport County	100	(0)
1967–1971	Manchester City	50	(0)
1971–1980	Shrewsbury Town	370	(0)
1980–1982	Crewe Alexandra	88	(0)
Total		608	(0)
- * Club domestic league appearances and goals

Kenneth John Mulhearn (16 October 1945 – 13 March 2018) was an English footballer who played as a goalkeeper for Stockport County, Manchester City, Shrewsbury Town and Crewe Alexandra.

== Playing career ==
=== Early career ===
Mulhearn started his career as an apprentice at Everton but did not make the first team, and moved into the lower divisions with Stockport County, where he made 100 appearances.

=== Manchester City ===
Mulhearn was signed by First Division Manchester City on 21 September 1967, a transfer which Stockport great Len Allchurch later reflected on by saying "...a great 'keeper. We never thought we'd replace him when he went to City". Two days later Manchester City's first choice goalkeeper Harry Dowd sustained an injury, and Mulhearn took his place in the team, his debut coming in a Manchester derby. He kept his place for the remainder of the season, gaining a League Championship medal as part of Manchester City's 1967–68 title-winning side.

Mulhearn started the following season as first choice, playing as they won the 1968 FA Charity Shield, but was dropped following a European Cup defeat to Fenerbahçe, in which his failure to claim a cross resulted in a winning goal for the Turkish side, leading Malcolm Allison to blame him for the defeat. He did not feature again that season, and dropped to third choice behind Dowd and Joe Corrigan. He returned to the first team for brief periods in the 1969–70 season, but by this time Corrigan had become established as a senior player and opportunities were limited. He made his final Manchester City appearance in a 1–1 draw against Arsenal on 18 February 1970.

=== Later career ===
In March 1971 he transferred to Shrewsbury Town, where he made 370 league appearances in nine years. His final club was Crewe Alexandra, where he made 88 appearances before retiring to run a public house in Shrewsbury.

== Personal life ==
Professional footballer Harry Lewis, also a goalkeeper, is Mulhearn's grandson.

Mulhearn died in his sleep on 13 March 2018.
