= Bouncer (disambiguation) =

A bouncer is a security guard employed by a nightclub or similar establishment to prevent troublemakers from entering or to eject them from the premises

Bouncer(s) or The Bouncer may also refer to:

== Art, entertainment, and media ==
=== Comics ===
- Bouncer (Fox Feature Syndicate), a Golden Age character and comic book series
- Bouncer (Les Humanoïdes Associés), a Western comics series by François Boucq and Alejandro Jodorowsky
- Bouncer (DC Comics), a DC Comics character and twice a foe of Batman
- Bouncer (Marvel Comics), a Marvel Comics character and member of the Morlocks

=== Fictional entities ===
- Bouncer (Big Daddy), a type of enemy in the video game Bioshock (2007) and its sequel Bioshock 2
- Bouncer (Fox Feature Syndicate), a comic book superhero
- Bouncer (Neighbours), a dog in the Australian soap opera Neighbours
  - Bouncer 2, a dog in the Australian soap opera Neighbours
- Bouncer, a type of fictional creature in the novel Red Planet by Robert A. Heinlein
- Bouncer, a Morlock in the Marvel Comics universe
- Bouncer, the giant of Tech in Skylanders: Giants
- Bouncers (Star Wars), an alien race in the fictional Star Wars universe

=== Music ===
- The Bouncer (album), a 2011 album by jazz pianist Cedar Walton
- "The Bouncer" (song), a 1992 song by Kicks Like a Mule
- "The Bouncer", a deleted track from the 1981 Electric Light Orchestra album Time, later released in 1983 as the B-side to the 12" single "Four Little Diamonds"

=== Video games ===
- The Bouncer (video game), a PlayStation 2 fighting video game
- Bouncer, the name of a Tech-element character from Skylanders: Giants

=== Other media ===
- The Bouncer (film), a 2018 French action thriller film
- Bouncers (1977), a play by the English dramatist John Godber

== Sports ==
- Bouncer (cricket), a type of delivery in cricket
- Bouncers (slamball team), an American SlamBall team
- Space hopper or bouncer, a sports toy

== Technology ==
- Bouncer (software) or BNC, a piece of software used to relay traffic and connections in computer networks
- a reflector (photography) used for bounce lighting
- a system designed to prevent malware from being released via Google Play
