= The Poznań =

Form of sporting celebration

The Poznań or Grecque (the Greek) is a form of sporting celebration that involves supporters standing with their backs to the pitch, linking arms side-by-side and jumping on the spot in unison. It is mostly associated with supporters of football club Lech Poznań in Poland, although it has been performed by fans of many football clubs throughout the world such as Manchester City in England and Charlotte FC in the United States. Its first use is thought to have been as a protest against club management while still supporting the team.

== Usage ==
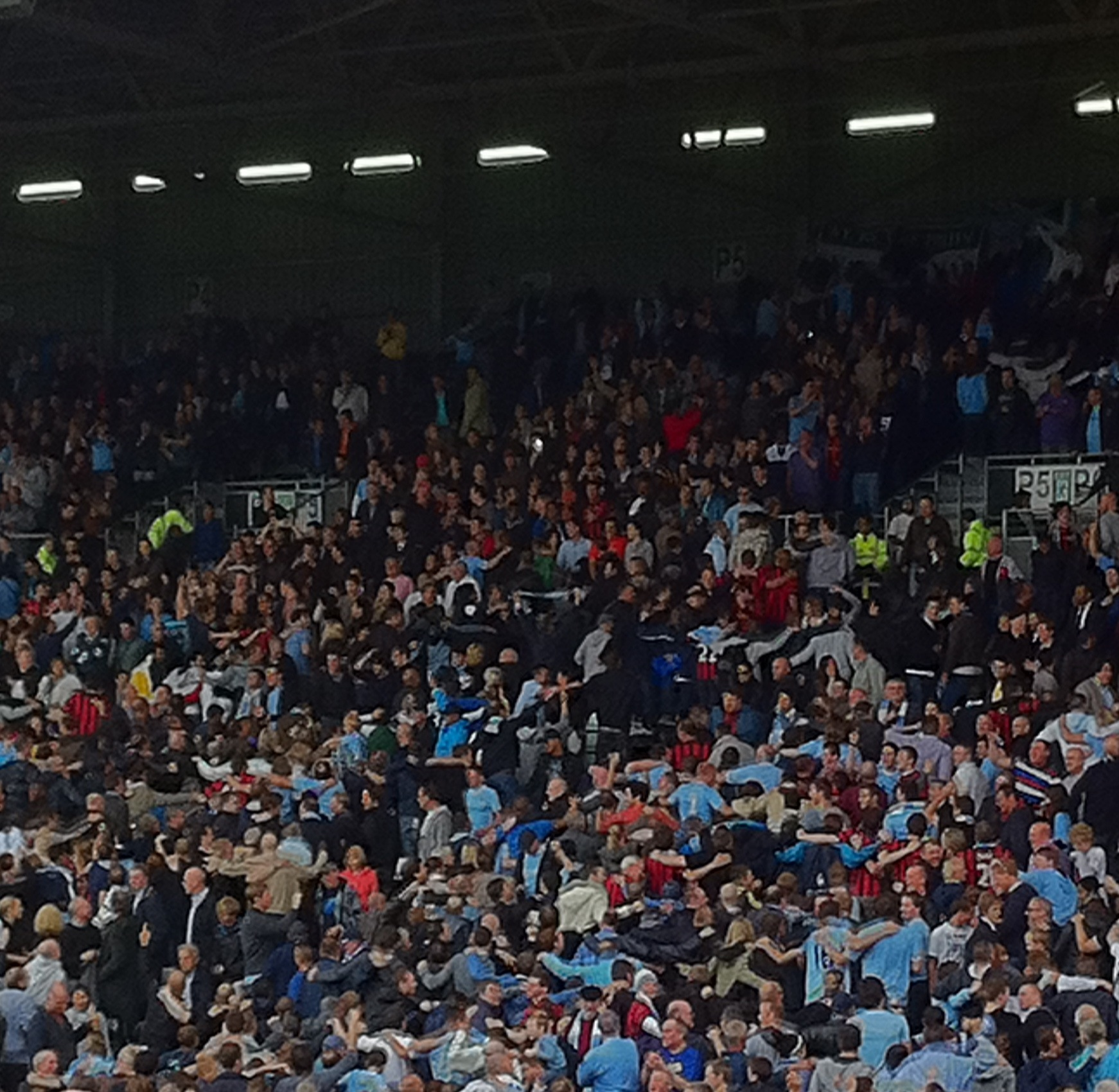
Manchester City fans doing the Poznań.

Lech Poznań fans.

The Poznań celebration involves the fans turning their backs to the pitch, joining arms and jumping up and down in unison. In Poland, and among many fans across Europe, it is not called "the Poznań" but is known as a "Grecque", and it is performed by fans of many teams. Despite initially failing to impress Manchester City fans when it was done during the teams' meeting in the UEFA Europa League group stage on 21 October 2010, it was subsequently adopted by City supporters during a game early the following month. The activity was coined "The Poznań" by Manchester City fans, in homage to the club that inspired them to celebrate in this way. The Poznań was briefly adopted by other English football supporters, notably those of Leicester City after their clash with Manchester City in the third round of the FA Cup in January 2011, and is referred to by English football fans as "doing the Poznań".

Initially, the supporters group of Australian club Western Sydney Wanderers, The Red and Black Bloc, performed it in the 80th minute of matches to represent the first football match played in Western Sydney in 1880. Subsequently, this has grown into an all stadium celebration.

The celebration has also been used at events such as concerts. During Oasis's Live '25 Tour, the band asked fans in attendance to do the Poznań during performances of the song "Cigarettes & Alcohol".

== Alternatives ==
Fans of the Scottish club Celtic have a similar celebration known as "The Huddle", whilst also facing away from the pitch; the words sung by the fans are "Let's All Do The Huddle". The "Huddle" performed by Celtic fans is closely linked to the on-field huddle conducted by the Celtic team prior to kick-off which was introduced by Tony Mowbray during his playing career at the club in the mid 1990s. Over the years, Celtic fans have carried out various versions of the huddle, although the first example of it being performed by large numbers of the club's supporters at a game was during a 3-0 win over Rangers at Celtic Park in February 2011.

Supporters of Deportivo Alavés, a La Liga team, have been known to celebrate most of their team's goals with a variation of "The Poznań" since at least 2014, in which they stand with their backs to the pitch, linking shoulders side-by-side and jumping on the spot while they sing the tune to the Pippi Longstocking TV series.

FC Copenhagen ultras have the past several years celebrated wins using a variant of the Poznań where the fans turn their backs to the pitch and jump from side to side while the players on the pitch do the same.

Charlotte FC fans begin home matches with the Poznań, where fans across the stadium turn their backs to the pitch and bounce up and down to the tune of Pepas. The dance has grown drastically in popularity since their inaugural season where it began with a few supporters groups, it now has spread across the majority of the stadium. They begin every home match with Pepas, and call it such as well.

In 2009, fans of Beşiktaş used this celebratory ritual as a means of voicing discontent with the club's management amidst a period of disappointing results. By adopting this unconventional form of protest, supporters called for the resignation of the club’s chairman.

== See also ==
- The Bouncy
- Mexican wave
- "Jump Around", a 1992 song by American hip hop group House of Pain used as the backdrop for similar fan actions
