= Tony Coleman =

English footballer (born 1945)

Personal information
- Full name: Anthony George Coleman
- Date of birth: 2 May 1945 (age 81)
- Place of birth: Liverpool, England
- Position: Winger

Senior career*
Years	Team	Apps	(Gls)
1961–1962	Stoke City	0	(0)
1962	Ellesmere Port Town		
1962–1964	Tranmere Rovers	8	(0)
1964–1965	Preston North End	5	(1)
1965	Bangor City	12	(2)
1965–1967	Doncaster Rovers	58	(11)
1967–1969	Manchester City	83	(12)
1969–1970	Sheffield Wednesday	26	(2)
1970	Cape Town City	7	(3)
1970–1971	Blackpool	17	(0)
1971–1972	Cape Town City	27	(14)
1972–1973	Durban City	?	(16)
1973–1974	Southport	23	(1)
1974–1976	Stockport County	30	(3)
1975–1976	→ Macclesfield Town (loan)	16	(2)
1976	Cape Town City	3	(0)
1976–1980	Guisborough Town		

Managerial career
- 1976: Macclesfield Town
- * Club domestic league appearances and goals

Anthony George Coleman (born 2 May 1945) is an English former footballer who made 250 appearances in the Football League playing for Tranmere Rovers, Preston North End, Doncaster Rovers, Manchester City, Sheffield Wednesday, Blackpool, Southport and Stockport County. He played on the left wing.

Coleman was known for his disciplinary problems during his career. He was thrown out of the youth team at Stoke City, deemed unmanageable by Preston North End and was almost banned for life by the FA after attacking a referee whilst at Doncaster Rovers.

In November 2009, an interview with Coleman was broadcast on Manchester City football show Blue Tuesday on BBC Manchester in which he spoke about his life in Australia and revealed that he intended to raise money by selling his football medals.

== Career statistics ==
Club	Season	League			FA Cup		League Cup		Other		Total	
Club	Season	Division	Apps	Goals	Apps	Goals	Apps	Goals	Apps	Goals	Apps	Goals
Stoke City	1961–62	Second Division	0	0	0	0	0	0	0	0	0	0
Tranmere Rovers	1962–63	Fourth Division	1	0	0	0	0	0	0	0	1	0
Tranmere Rovers	1963–64	Fourth Division	7	0	0	0	0	0	0	0	7	0
Tranmere Rovers	Total		8	0	0	0	0	0	0	0	8	0
Preston North End	1964–65	Second Division	5	1	0	0	0	0	0	0	5	1
Doncaster Rovers	1965–66	Fourth Division	32	5	2	0	0	0	0	0	34	5
Doncaster Rovers	1966–67	Third Division	26	6	2	0	4	0	0	0	32	6
Doncaster Rovers	Total		58	11	4	0	4	0	0	0	66	11
Manchester City	1966–67	First Division	9	1	0	0	0	0	0	0	9	1
Manchester City	1967–68	First Division	38	8	4	1	4	0	0	0	46	9
Manchester City	1968–69	First Division	31	3	6	2	3	0	2	1	42	6
Manchester City	1969–70	First Division	5	0	0	0	1	0	1	0	7	0
Manchester City	Total		83	12	10	3	8	0	3	1	104	16
Sheffield Wednesday	1969–70	First Division	26	2	2	0	0	0	3	0	31	2
Blackpool	1970–71	First Division	17	0	2	0	2	1	0	0	21	1
Southport	1973–74	Third Division	23	1	1	0	0	0	0	0	24	1
Stockport County	1974–75	Fourth Division	23	3	0	0	1	0	0	0	24	3
Stockport County	1975–76	Fourth Division	7	0	0	0	0	0	0	0	7	0
Stockport County	Total		30	3	0	0	1	0	0	0	31	3
Career total			250	30	19	3	13	1	6	1	288	35

== Honours ==
Doncaster Rovers

- Football League Fourth Division: 1964–65

Manchester City

- Football League First Division: 1967–68
- FA Cup: 1968–69
