= 1965–66 Manchester City F.C. season =

English football club season

Manchester City F.C.
1965–66 season
- Manager: Joe Mercer and Malcolm Allison
- Football League Second Division: 1st
- FA Cup: Sixth round
- League Cup: Third round
- Top goalscorer: League: Neil Young (14 goals); All: Neil Young (17 goals)
- Highest home attendance: 63,034 vs Everton (26 March 1966)
- Lowest home attendance: 13,235 vs Norwich City (8 September 1965)

The 1965–66 season was Manchester City F.C.'s seventy-fourth season of league football, and second consecutive season back in the Football League Second Division. The three-season stay in the Second Division was City's longest run of seasons outside the top flight since the 1890s, which would not be broken again until their four-season run from 1996 to 2000.

This season is widely believed to have been the start of Manchester City's golden era, a period largely concurrent with the reign of Joe Mercer and Malcolm Allison as managers at the club, and then of the aftermath of the break-up of the partnership. This season began City's highest concentration of silverware to seasons played - winning the Second Division for a record sixth time in this season, the club would claim the Football League First Division title, the FA Cup, the Football League Cup twice, the Charity Shield twice, and in European competition the UEFA Cup Winners' Cup all within the space of the ten seasons following.

This season also saw the club sign several players who would become iconic figures in Manchester City's history - Mike Summerbee, George Heslop, and Colin Bell were all signed near the start of the season. Not coincidentally, the season and the seasons following also saw the presence of some of the club's longest-serving players. Four of the club's ten players with the most appearances for the club played during this season - Bell, Summerbee, Alan Oakes, and Mike Doyle - and a further three of those ten - Joe Corrigan, Tommy Booth and Willie Donachie - would join within the following three seasons.

== Football League Second Division ==
Pos	Team	Pld	W	D	L	GF	GA	GAv	Pts	Qualification or relegation
1	Manchester City (C, P)	42	22	15	5	76	44	1.727	59	Promotion to the First Division
2	Southampton (P)	42	22	10	10	85	56	1.518	54	Promotion to the First Division
3	Coventry City	42	20	13	9	73	53	1.377	53	
4	Huddersfield Town	42	19	13	10	62	36	1.722	51	
5	Bristol City	42	17	17	8	63	48	1.313	51	

Rules for classification: 1) Points; 2) Goal average; 3) Goals scored
(C) Champions; (P) Promoted

=== Results summary ===
Overall								Home						Away					
Pld	W	D	L	GF	GA	GAv	Pts	W	D	L	GF	GA	Pts	W	D	L	GF	GA	Pts
42	22	15	5	76	44	1.727	59	14	7	0	40	14	35	8	8	5	36	30	24

Source: rsssf.com

=== Reports ===
Date	Opponents	H / A	Venue	Result F – A	Scorers	Attendance
21 August 1965	Middlesbrough	A	Ayresome Park	1 – 1	Murray	17,982
25 August 1965	Wolverhampton Wanderers	H	Maine Road	2 – 1	? (o.g.) (2)	25,572
28 August 1965	Bristol City	H	Maine Road	2 – 2	Brand, ? (o.g.)	19,349
30 August 1965	Wolverhampton Wanderers	A	Molineux	4 – 2	Doyle, Crossan, Murray, ? (o.g.)	22,799
4 September 1965	Coventry City	A	Highfield Road	3 – 3	Young (2), Murray	29,403
8 September 1965	Norwich City	H	Maine Road	Abandoned at half-time due to flooding 1 – 1	Young	13,235
11 September 1965	Carlisle United	H	Maine Road	2 – 1	Pardoe (2)	22,891
15 September 1965	Norwich City	A	Carrow Road	3 – 3	Pardoe (2), Crossan	16,381
18 September 1965	Cardiff City	A	Ninian Park	3 – 4	Murray, Pardoe, Gray	11,520
25 September 1965	Derby County	H	Maine Road	1 – 0	Murray	20,834
2 October 1965	Southampton	A	The Dell	1 – 0	Young	21,504
9 October 1965	Huddersfield Town	A	Leeds Road	0 – 0		31,876
16 October 1965	Crystal Palace	H	Maine Road	3 – 1	Pardoe (2), Young	24,765
23 October 1965	Preston North End	A	Deepdale	3 – 0	Young (2), Brand	25,117
27 October 1965	Norwich City	H	Maine Road	0 – 0		34,091
30 October 1965	Charlton Athletic	H	Maine Road	0 – 0		23,102
6 November 1965	Plymouth Argyle	A	Home Park	0 – 1		15,954
13 November 1965	Portsmouth	H	Maine Road	3 – 1	Murray (2), Pardoe	22,106
20 November 1965	Bolton Wanderers	A	Burnden Park	0 – 1		22,968
27 November 1965	Ipswich Town	H	Maine Road	2 – 1	Crossan (2)	19,416
4 December 1965	Birmingham City	A	St Andrews	1 – 3	Summerbee	10,442
11 December 1965	Leyton Orient	H	Maine Road	5 – 0	Young (3), Summerbee, Crossan	16,202
18 December 1965	Crystal Palace	A	Selhurst Park	2 – 0	Doyle (2)	12,847
1 January 1966	Huddersfield Town	H	Maine Road	2 – 0	Doyle, Crossan	47,171
8 January 1966	Portsmouth	A	Fratton Park	2 – 2	Doyle, Summerbee	17,352
12 January 1966	Rotherham United	H	Maine Road	3 – 1	Doyle (2), Crossan	25,526
15 January 1966	Preston North End	H	Maine Road	0 – 0		26,668
29 January 1966	Middlesbrough	H	Maine Road	3 – 1	Summerbee (2), Young	25,278
5 February 1966	Bristol City	A	Ashton Gate	1 – 1	Young	25,273
19 February 1966	Coventry City	H	Maine Road	1 – 0	Crossan	40,190
26 February 1966	Carlisle United	A	Brunton Park	2 – 1	Summerbee, Pardoe	9,000
12 March 1966	Cardiff City	H	Maine Road	2 – 2	Connor, Young	29,642
19 March 1966	Derby County	A	Baseball Ground	2 – 1	Bell, Young	22,533
2 April 1966	Plymouth Argyle	H	Maine Road	1 – 1	Crossan	24,087
8 April 1966	Bury	H	Maine Road	1 – 0	Summerbee	43,104
12 April 1966	Bury	A	Gigg Lane	1 – 2	Summerbee	21,437
16 April 1966	Bolton Wanderers	H	Maine Road	4 – 1	Kennedy, Sear, Crossan, Connor	29,459
23 April 1966	Ipswich Town	A	Portman Road	1 – 1	Crossan	15,995
30 April 1966	Birmingham City	H	Maine Road	3 – 1	Bell, Young, Crossan	28,409
4 May 1966	Rotherham United	A	Millmoor	1 – 0	Bell	11,376
7 May 1966	Leyton Orient	A	Brisbane Road	2 – 2	Bell, ? (o.g.)	6,109
13 May 1966	Charlton Athletic	A	The Valley	3 – 2	Oakes, Crossan, Connor	13,687
18 May 1966	Southampton	H	Maine Road	0 – 0		34,653

== FA Cup ==
Date	Round	Opponents	H / A	Venue	Result F – A	Scorers	Attendance
22 January 1966	Third round	Blackpool	A	Bloomfield Road	1 – 1	Crossan	23,937
24 January 1966	Third round replay	Blackpool	H	Maine Road	3 – 1	Summerbee, Doyle, Crossan	52,661
12 February 1966	Fourth round	Grimsby Town	H	Maine Road	2 – 0	Summerbee, ? (o.g.)	37,918
5 March 1966	Fifth round	Leicester City	H	Maine Road	2 – 2	Young (2)	56,787
9 March 1966	Fifth round replay	Leicester City	A	Filbert Street	1 – 0	Young	41,872
26 March 1966	Sixth round	Everton	H	Maine Road	0 – 0		63,034
29 March 1966	Sixth round replay	Everton	A	Goodison Park	0 – 0		60,349
4 April 1966	Sixth round second replay	Everton	N	Molineux	0 – 2		27,948

== League Cup ==
Date	Round	Opponents	H / A	Venue	Result F – A	Scorers	Attendance
22 September 1965	Second round	Leicester City	H	Maine Road	3 – 1	Murray, Pardoe, ? (o.g.)	13,246
13 October 1965	Third round	Coventry City	H	Maine Road	2 – 3	Crossan, Pardoe	18,213

== Squad statistics ==
=== Squad ===
Appearances for competitive matches only

Pos.	Name	League		FA Cup		League Cup		Total	
Pos.	Name	Apps	Goals	Apps	Goals	Apps	Goals	Apps	Goals
GK	(England) Harry Dowd	38 (0)	0	8	0	1	0	47 (0)	0
GK	(England) Alan Ogley	4 (0)	0	0	0	1	0	5 (0)	0
DF	(England) Dave Bacuzzi	15 (1)	0	0	0	0	0	15 (1)	0
DF	(England) David Connor	29 (1)	4	8	0	0	0	37 (1)	4
DF	(England) Mike Doyle	19 (1)	7	7	1	0	0	26 (1)	8
DF	(England) George Heslop	34 (0)	0	8	0	1	0	43 (0)	0
DF	(England) Glyn Pardoe	41 (1)	9	8	0	2	2	51 (1)	11
DF	(Wales) Cliff Sear	19 (0)	1	3	0	2	0	24 (0)	1
MF	(England) Colin Bell	11 (0)	4	0	0	0	0	11 (0)	4
MF	(England) Roy Cheetham	12 (3)	0	2	0	1	0	15 (3)	0
MF	(England) Stan Horne	15 (0)	0	5	0	1	0	21 (0)	0
MF	(Scotland) Bobby Kennedy	35 (0)	1	8	0	2	0	45 (0)	1
MF	(England) Alan Oakes	41 (0)	1	8	0	2	0	51 (0)	1
FW	(Scotland) Ralph Brand	17 (0)	2	0	0	1	0	18 (0)	2
FW	(Northern Ireland) Johnny Crossan	40 (0)	12	8	2	1	1	49 (0)	15
FW	(Scotland) Matt Gray	3 (3)	1	0	0	1	0	4 (3)	1
FW	(England) Jimmy Murray	11 (0)	7	0	0	1	1	12 (0)	8
FW	(England) Mike Summerbee	42 (0)	8	8	2	2	0	52 (0)	10
FW	(England) Alf Wood	1 (1)	0	0	0	1	0	2 (1)	0
FW	(England) Neil Young	35 (0)	14	7	3	2	0	44 (0)	17
--	(England) Vic Gomersall	1 (0)	0	0	0	0	0	1 (0)	0

=== Scorers ===
==== All ====
Scorer	Goals
(England) Neil Young	17
(Northern Ireland) Johnny Crossan	15
(England) Glyn Pardoe	11
(England) Mike Summerbee	10
(England) Mike Doyle	8
(England) Jimmy Murray	8
(England) Colin Bell	4
(England) David Connor	4
(Scotland) Ralph Brand	2
(Scotland) Matt Gray	1
(Scotland) Bobby Kennedy	1
(England) Alan Oakes	1
(Wales) Cliff Sear	1

==== League ====
Scorer	Goals
(England) Neil Young	14
(Northern Ireland) Johnny Crossan	12
(England) Glyn Pardoe	9
(England) Mike Summerbee	8
(England) Mike Doyle	7
(England) Jimmy Murray	7
(England) Colin Bell	4
(England) David Connor	4
(Scotland) Ralph Brand	2
(Scotland) Matt Gray	1
(Scotland) Bobby Kennedy	1
(England) Alan Oakes	1
(Wales) Cliff Sear	1

==== FA Cup ====
Scorer	Goals
(England) Neil Young	3
(Northern Ireland) Johnny Crossan	2
(England) Mike Summerbee	2
(England) Mike Doyle	1

==== League Cup ====
Scorer	Goals
(England) Glyn Pardoe	2
(Northern Ireland) Johnny Crossan	1
(England) Jimmy Murray	1

== Transfers ==
=== In ===
Date	Pos.	Name	From	Fee
August 1965	FW	(Scotland) Ralph Brand	(Scotland) Rangers	£20,000
August 1965	FW	(England) Mike Summerbee	(England) Swindon Town	£35,000
September 1965	DF	(England) George Heslop	(England) Everton	£25,000
March 1966	MF	(England) Colin Bell	(England) Bury	£42,500

=== Out ===
Date	Pos.	Name	From	Fee
August 1965	FW	(England) Derek Kevan	(England) Crystal Palace	£22,000

== See also ==
- Manchester City F.C. seasons
