= 1968–69 in English football =

Football in England
- Season: 1968–69

Men's football
- First Division: Leeds United
- Second Division: Derby County
- Third Division: Watford
- Fourth Division: Doncaster Rovers
- FA Cup: Manchester City
- League Cup: Swindon Town
- Charity Shield: Manchester City

The 1968–69 season was the 89th season of competitive football in England.

== Honours ==
Competition	Winner	Runner-up
First Division	Leeds United (1)	Liverpool
Second Division	Derby County	Crystal Palace
Third Division	Watford	Swindon Town
Fourth Division	Doncaster Rovers	Halifax Town
FA Cup	Manchester City (4)	Leicester City
League Cup	Swindon Town (1)	Arsenal
Charity Shield	Manchester City	West Bromwich Albion
Home Championship	England	Scotland

Notes = Number in parentheses is the times that club has won that honour.

== FA Cup ==
Manchester City defeated relegated Leicester City 1–0 in the FA Cup Final. Neil Young scored the only goal of the game, although Leicester's David Nish gained the record as the youngest captain of a cup finalist at the age of 21.

The season's giant-killers were Third Division Mansfield Town who accounted for Sheffield United in the Third Round and West Ham in the Fifth before going out to Leicester in the Sixth Round.

== League Cup ==
Swindon Town won the final 3–1 against Arsenal, one of the competition's most notiable upsets. Swindon's non-top flight status saw them barred from competing in the Inter-Cities Fairs Cup which led to the creation of the Anglo-Italian Cup the following season.

== European football ==
Newcastle United won their first European trophy in their history by beating Újpest of Hungary 6–2 on aggregate to lift the Inter-Cities Fairs Cup.

== Football League ==
=== First Division ===
Leeds United won the League for the first time in their history, finishing six points ahead of Liverpool.

Manchester United's final season under the management of Sir Matt Busby before his retirement ended in an 11th-place finish, although their defence of the European Cup lasted until the semi-finals. Their cross city rivals finished 13th, a year after winning the league title, but won the FA Cup in the same season.

Newly promoted Queens Park Rangers were relegated after finishing bottom, along with the FA Cup runners-up Leicester City.

Pos	Team	Pld	W	D	L	GF	GA	GAv	Pts	Qualification or relegation
1	Leeds United (C)	42	27	13	2	66	26	2.538	67	Qualification for the European Cup first round
2	Liverpool	42	25	11	6	63	24	2.625	61	Qualification for the Inter-Cities Fairs Cup first round
3	Everton	42	21	15	6	77	36	2.139	57	
4	Arsenal	42	22	12	8	56	27	2.074	56	Qualification for the Inter-Cities Fairs Cup first round (Note: Everton were ineligible to participate in the Inter-Cities Fairs Cup as Liverpool had already qualified. Under the rules of the cup, only one team per city could participate. Arsenal took their place as the highest-ranked team that had not already qualified for a European competition.)
5	Chelsea	42	20	10	12	73	53	1.377	50	
6	Tottenham Hotspur	42	14	17	11	61	51	1.196	45	
7	Southampton	42	16	13	13	57	48	1.188	45	Qualification for the Inter-Cities Fairs Cup first round (Note: Chelsea and Tottenham Hotspur were ineligible to participate in the Inter-Cities Fairs Cup as Arsenal had already qualified. Under the rules of the cup, only one team per city could participate. Southampton took their place as the highest-ranked team that had not already qualified for a European competition.)
8	West Ham United	42	13	18	11	66	50	1.320	44	
9	Newcastle United	42	15	14	13	61	55	1.109	44	Qualification for the Inter-Cities Fairs Cup first round (Note: Newcastle United qualified for the Inter-Cities Fairs Cup as the 1968-69 Inter-Cities Fairs Cup winners)
10	West Bromwich Albion	42	16	11	15	64	67	0.955	43	
11	Manchester United	42	15	12	15	57	53	1.075	42	
12	Ipswich Town	42	15	11	16	59	60	0.983	41	
13	Manchester City	42	15	10	17	64	55	1.164	40	Qualification for the European Cup Winners' Cup first round (Note: Manchester City qualified for the European Cup Winners' Cup as the 1968-69 FA Cup winners.)
14	Burnley	42	15	9	18	55	82	0.671	39	
15	Sheffield Wednesday	42	10	16	16	41	54	0.759	36	
16	Wolverhampton Wanderers	42	10	15	17	41	58	0.707	35	
17	Sunderland	42	11	12	19	43	67	0.642	34	
18	Nottingham Forest	42	10	13	19	45	57	0.789	33	
19	Stoke City	42	9	15	18	40	63	0.635	33	
20	Coventry City	42	10	11	21	46	64	0.719	31	
21	Leicester City (R)	42	9	12	21	39	68	0.574	30	Relegation to the Second Division
22	Queens Park Rangers (R)	42	4	10	28	39	95	0.411	18	Relegation to the Second Division

Source: World Football
Rules for classification: 1) Points; 2) Goal average; 3) Goals scored
(C) Champions; (R) Relegated

=== Second Division ===
Derby County were runaway winners of the Second Division and they were joined in being promoted by runners-up Crystal Palace. Despite still boasting the talents of Johnny Haynes and George Cohen, Fulham finished bottom and were relegated. They were joined in the Third Division by perennial strugglers Bury

Pos	Team	Pld	W	D	L	GF	GA	GAv	Pts	Qualification or relegation
1	Derby County (C, P)	42	26	11	5	65	32	2.031	63	Promotion to the First Division
2	Crystal Palace (P)	42	22	12	8	70	47	1.489	56	Promotion to the First Division
3	Charlton Athletic	42	18	14	10	61	52	1.173	50	
4	Middlesbrough	42	19	11	12	58	49	1.184	49	
5	Cardiff City	42	20	7	15	67	54	1.241	47	Qualification for the Cup Winners' Cup first round (Note: Cardiff City qualified for the European Cup Winners' Cup as the 1968–69 Welsh Cup winners.)
6	Huddersfield Town	42	17	12	13	53	46	1.152	46	
7	Birmingham City	42	18	8	16	73	59	1.237	44	
8	Blackpool	42	14	15	13	51	41	1.244	43	
9	Sheffield United	42	16	11	15	61	50	1.220	43	
10	Millwall	42	17	9	16	57	49	1.163	43	
11	Hull City	42	13	16	13	59	52	1.135	42	
12	Carlisle United	42	16	10	16	46	49	0.939	42	
13	Norwich City	42	15	10	17	53	56	0.946	40	
14	Preston North End	42	12	15	15	38	44	0.864	39	
15	Portsmouth	42	12	14	16	58	58	1.000	38	
16	Bristol City	42	11	16	15	46	53	0.868	38	
17	Bolton Wanderers	42	12	14	16	55	67	0.821	38	
18	Aston Villa	42	12	14	16	37	48	0.771	38	
19	Blackburn Rovers	42	13	11	18	52	63	0.825	37	
20	Oxford United	42	12	9	21	34	55	0.618	33	
21	Bury (R)	42	11	8	23	51	80	0.638	30	Relegation to the Third Division
22	Fulham (R)	42	7	11	24	40	81	0.494	25	Relegation to the Third Division

Rules for classification: 1) Points; 2) Goal average; 3) Goals scored
(C) Champions; (P) Promoted; (R) Relegated

=== Third Division ===
Watford won the title on goal average (Goal Ratio) from Swindon Town and both teams were duly promoted. At the bottom end Northampton Town, Hartlepool, Crewe Alexandra and Oldham Athletic were all relegated.

Pos	Team	Pld	W	D	L	GF	GA	GAv	Pts	Promotion or relegation
1	Watford (C, P)	46	27	10	9	74	34	2.176	64	Promotion to the Second Division
2	Swindon Town (P)	46	27	10	9	71	35	2.029	64	Promotion to the Second Division
3	Luton Town	46	25	11	10	74	38	1.947	61	
4	Bournemouth & Boscombe Athletic	46	21	9	16	60	45	1.333	51	
5	Plymouth Argyle	46	17	15	14	53	49	1.082	49	
6	Torquay United	46	18	12	16	54	46	1.174	48	
7	Tranmere Rovers	46	19	10	17	70	68	1.029	48	
8	Southport	46	17	13	16	71	64	1.109	47	
9	Stockport County	46	16	14	16	67	68	0.985	46	
10	Barnsley	46	16	14	16	58	63	0.921	46	
11	Rotherham United	46	16	13	17	56	50	1.120	45	
12	Brighton & Hove Albion	46	16	13	17	72	65	1.108	45	
13	Walsall	46	14	16	16	50	49	1.020	44	
14	Reading	46	15	13	18	67	66	1.015	43	
15	Mansfield Town	46	16	11	19	58	62	0.935	43	
16	Bristol Rovers	46	16	11	19	63	71	0.887	43	
17	Shrewsbury Town	46	16	11	19	51	67	0.761	43	
18	Orient	46	14	14	18	51	58	0.879	42	
19	Barrow	46	17	8	21	56	75	0.747	42	
20	Gillingham	46	13	15	18	54	63	0.857	41	
21	Northampton Town (R)	46	14	12	20	54	61	0.885	40	Relegation to the Fourth Division
22	Hartlepool (R)	46	10	19	17	40	70	0.571	39	Relegation to the Fourth Division
23	Crewe Alexandra (R)	46	13	9	24	52	76	0.684	35	Relegation to the Fourth Division
24	Oldham Athletic (R)	46	13	9	24	50	83	0.602	35	Relegation to the Fourth Division

Source: rsssf.com
Rules for classification: 1) points; 2) goal average; 3) number of goals scored.
(C) Champions; (P) Promoted; (R) Relegated

=== Fourth Division ===
The Division was won by Doncaster Rovers, who were promoted along with Halifax Town, Rochdale and Bradford City. No team failed re-election so no new members were admitted to the Football League.

Pos	Team	Pld	W	D	L	GF	GA	GAv	Pts	Promotion or relegation
1	Doncaster Rovers (C, P)	46	21	17	8	65	38	1.711	59	Promotion to the Third Division
2	Halifax Town (P)	46	20	17	9	53	37	1.432	57	Promotion to the Third Division
3	Rochdale (P)	46	18	20	8	68	35	1.943	56	Promotion to the Third Division
4	Bradford City (P)	46	18	20	8	65	46	1.413	56	Promotion to the Third Division
5	Darlington	46	17	18	11	62	45	1.378	52	
6	Colchester United	46	20	12	14	57	53	1.075	52	
7	Southend United	46	19	13	14	78	61	1.279	51	
8	Lincoln City	46	17	17	12	54	52	1.038	51	
9	Wrexham	46	18	14	14	61	52	1.173	50	
10	Swansea Town	46	19	11	16	58	54	1.074	49	
11	Brentford	46	18	12	16	64	65	0.985	48	
12	Workington	46	15	17	14	40	43	0.930	47	
13	Port Vale	46	16	14	16	46	46	1.000	46	
14	Chester	46	16	13	17	76	66	1.152	45	
15	Aldershot	46	19	7	20	66	66	1.000	45	
16	Scunthorpe United	46	18	8	20	61	60	1.017	44	
17	Exeter City	46	16	11	19	66	65	1.015	43	
18	Peterborough United	46	13	16	17	60	57	1.053	42	
19	Notts County	46	12	18	16	48	57	0.842	42	
20	Chesterfield	46	13	15	18	43	50	0.860	41	
21	York City	46	14	11	21	53	75	0.707	39	Re-elected
22	Newport County	46	11	14	21	49	74	0.662	36	Re-elected
23	Grimsby Town	46	9	15	22	47	69	0.681	33	Re-elected
24	Bradford (Park Avenue)	46	5	10	31	32	106	0.302	20	Re-elected

Source: rsssf.com
Rules for classification: 1) points; 2) goal average; 3) number of goals scored.
(C) Champions; (P) Promoted

=== Top goalscorers ===
First Division

- Jimmy Greaves (Tottenham Hotspur) – 27 goals

Second Division

- John Toshack (Cardiff City) – 22 goals

Third Division

- Don Rogers (Swindon Town) – 22 goals

Fourth Division

- Gary Talbot (Chester) – 22 goals

== Events of the season ==
- 3 August 1968 – The reigning champions Manchester City beat the FA Cup holders West Bromwich Albion 6–1 in the Charity Shield at Maine Road. Bobby Owen and Francis Lee both score twice.
- 10 August 1968 – The League season begins with Manchester City losing 2–1 to Liverpool at Anfield. Promoted Queens Park Rangers draw their first match in the First Division at home to Leicester City, and Arsenal win the North London derby 2–1 at White Hart Lane.
- 17 August 1968 – The Manchester derby at Maine Road finishes goalless. Draws for West Ham United and Arsenal (against Nottingham Forest and Liverpool respectively) end their 100% records, leaving Leeds United as the only First Division club with six points out of six. Crystal Palace and Millwall are the teams with maximum points in Division Two, while Mansfield Town and Lincoln City, of Divisions Three and Four respectively, have won both of their games thus far.
- 19 October 1968 – Geoff Hurst scores six times as West Ham United thrash Sunderland 8–0 to equal their record League victory. Burnley beat Leeds United 5–1.
- 18 December 1968 – Tommy Docherty becomes the manager at Aston Villa, his third club in six weeks, after his resignation from Rotherham United and a brief spell at Queens Park Rangers.
- 21 December 1968 – Liverpool beat Tottenham Hotspur 1–0 to top the First Division table at Christmas. Leeds United, who avenge their earlier defeat to Burnley by beating the Clarets 6–1 at Elland Road, are three points behind with two games in hand, while Everton and Arsenal remain in contention. At the bottom, Queens Park Rangers and Coventry City occupy the relegation places.
- 14 January 1969 – Sir Matt Busby announces that he will retire as the manager of Manchester United at the end of the season.
- 20 January 1969 – Brian Purcell and Roy Evans, two Hereford United players, are killed in a car crash on their way to an FA Cup tie at Nuneaton Borough.
- 22 February 1969– Mary Raine became the first woman to report on sport for the BBC, when she was sent to report on the Chelsea-Sunderland league game for radio’s Sports Report. The match finished 5-1 to Chelsea.
- 15 March 1969 – Third Division Swindon Town cause a major shock by beating Arsenal 3–1 in the League Cup final thanks to two goals in extra-time from Don Rogers.
- 19 March 1969 – Struggling Manchester United beat bottom-of-the-table Queens Park Rangers 8–1 at Old Trafford in one of the highest-scoring matches of the First Division season.
- 29 March 1969 – Queens Park Rangers lose 2–1 at home to Liverpool and are relegated from the First Division in their first season after promotion, having won just three of their 38 matches so far.
- 11 April 1969 – The Football Writers' Association Footballer of the Year award is shared for the first time in the 21 years the accolade has existed: Manchester City's Tony Book and Dave Mackay of Derby County are the joint-winners. Leeds' Billy Bremner finishes third, and Jimmy Greaves of Tottenham is fourth.
- 26 April 1969 – Manchester City win the FA Cup with a Neil Young goal giving them a 1–0 win over relegation-threatened Leicester City in the Wembley final.
- 28 April 1969 – Leeds United draw 0–0 with second-placed Liverpool at Anfield to clinch the First Division title for the first time in their history.
- 15 May 1969 – Manchester United's defence of the European Cup ends when they are knocked out by Milan in the semi-finals. They win the second leg at Old Trafford 1–0 with a goal by Bobby Charlton, but lose 2–1 on aggregate. Milan's goalkeeper Fabio Cudicini is injured by an object thrown from the crowd.
- 17 May 1969 – Three weeks after their FA Cup final defeat, Leicester City are relegated from the First Division. Needing to beat Manchester United to overtake Coventry City, they lose 3–2 in Matt Busby's last match as Manchester United's manager. Liverpool's draw with Newcastle United leaves them in second place, six points behind Leeds United, who finish the season with just two defeats and unbeaten in their last 28 League games since October.
- 11 June 1969 – Newcastle United beat Újpest Dózsa 3–2 in the second leg of the Inter-Cities Fairs Cup Final to secure a 6–2 aggregate victory and win their first European trophy.

== Star players ==
For the only time in its history, the Football Writers' Association Footballer of the Year was shared by two players — Tony Book of Manchester City and Dave Mackay of Derby County. For the sixth and final time in his career, Tottenham Hotspur's Jimmy Greaves was Division One top-scorer with 27 goals. He was also top-scorer in the league overall with 22 goals taking the Second Division award for John Toshack of Cardiff City.

== Star managers ==
- Don Revie led Leeds United to their first ever League win, with a record number of points, losing just two matches and set in place a team that was to become one of the most successful of the late 1960s and early 1970s.
- Already a club legend as a player, Joe Harvey became one of Newcastle United's most celebrated managers by leading the club to European glory.
- Ken Furphy took Watford into the Second Division after a close race with Swindon Town. However Swindon's Danny Williams also won the League Cup to make his own name.

== National team ==
The England national football team enjoyed a successful year in the build-up to the 1970 FIFA World Cup, for which they had automatically qualified as holders of the trophy after the 1966 FIFA World Cup. They won the 1969 British Home Championship by beating all three opponents and only lost one game all year, to Brazil during an end of season tour to the Americas.

=== American tour ===
1 June 1969

Mexico	0–0	England

Estadio Azteca, Mexico City

8 June 1969

Uruguay	1–2	England
Cubilla		Lee, Hurst

Centenario Stadium, Montevideo

12 June 1969

Brazil	2–1	England
Tostao, Jairzinho		Bell

Maracanã Stadium, Rio de Janeiro

== Deaths ==
- 5 October 1968 – Joe Brough, 81.
- 8 October 1968 – Frank Womack, 80.
- 14 October 1968 – Paul Shardlow, 25, heart attack.
- October 1968 – Eric Sweeney, 65
- December 1968 – Brian Hill, 31.
- 20 January 1969, Brian Purcell, 30, and Roy Evans, 25, car accident.
- 21 January 1969, Len Andrews, 80.
- April 1969, Harry Nuttall, 71
- 13 July 1969, Bobby Barclay, 62
