= Glyn Pardoe =

English footballer (1946–2020)

Personal information
- Date of birth: 1 June 1946
- Place of birth: Winsford, England
- Date of death: 26 May 2020 (aged 73)
- Positions: Full-back; forward

Youth career
- Manchester City

Senior career*
| Years | Team | Apps | (Gls) |
| 1962–1976 | Manchester City | 305 | (17) |

International career
| 1969 | England U23 | 4 | (0) |
- * Club domestic league appearances and goals

Glyn Pardoe (1 June 1946 – 26 May 2020) was an English footballer who played for Manchester City between 1962 and 1974. He made his first-team debut against Birmingham City in April 1962. At not quite 16 years of age he became Manchester City's youngest-ever player, a record which still stands in 2026.

A versatile right-footer who played mainly on the left, Pardoe was a forward early in his career, but converted to full-back in 1966, a position he retained for the rest of his career. Pardoe was part of the Manchester City team in the club's most successful era. Under the management of Joe Mercer and Malcolm Allison, the club won the league championship, FA Cup, League Cup and European Cup Winners' Cup in a three-year period.

After suffering a severe leg injury in 1970, Pardoe spent two years on the sidelines, and struggled to hold down a first team place upon his return. He retired in 1976, taking a place on the coaching staff, and remained at the club until 1992.

== Career ==
Pardoe was raised in the Cheshire town of Winsford, where his father worked for a tailor. In his youth he played for Mid-Cheshire Boys, and received approaches from both Everton and Manchester City. He chose City as his cousin Alan Oakes was on the books at the club, and so joined the club as an amateur in July 1961. He made his first team debut in April 1962 against Birmingham City. Aged 15 years and 314 days, he became Manchester City's youngest ever player. Though Pardoe played at full-back during most of his career, his first appearances were at centre-forward. On his debut he replaced Colin Barlow in the line-up, and he had represented England Schoolboys as a centre-forward. He also won 4 England under 23 caps. After his City debut, he played a further three consecutive matches.

Manchester City's opening match of the 1962–63 season was against Wolverhampton Wanderers. Pardoe was named in the starting line-up, but the match ended in an 8–1 defeat, and he was dropped from the team. Two games later he was selected to face Liverpool at Anfield, but this match also ended in a heavy defeat. More than six months passed before his next chance, where this time he played at left-half for two matches. He made only one further appearance that season, which ended in relegation for Manchester City. The following season Pardoe was in and out of the side, making 21 first team appearances.

In April 1964, Pardoe was part of the Manchester City youth team that faced local rivals Manchester United in the final of the FA Youth Cup. In the first leg he scored City's only goal in a 4–1 defeat, and in the second leg he scored twice as City lost 4–3, making the aggregate score an 8–4 defeat.

Once converted to full-back, Pardoe became a fixture in the Manchester City team, and played at left-back throughout the club's successful period in the late 1960s and early 1970s. When substitutes were introduced to league football at the start of the 1965–66 season, Pardoe became the first Manchester City player to be named as substitute. However, he did not play, and Roy Cheetham became the first City player to come on as a substitute three games later. After spending the opening match on the bench, Pardoe was restored to the starting line-up and played every game for the rest of the season. Manchester City won the Second Division by five points, and were promoted to the First Division. Pardoe was still predominantly a forward at this point. He scored 11 goals in 50 appearances, the most productive goalscoring season of his career. Six of these came in September, including braces in consecutive matches, against Carlisle United and Norwich City.

Pardoe's transition to left back came in October 1966. Both regular full back Bobby Kennedy and his replacement David Connor were injured, so Pardoe, who had played at both half-back and centre-forward earlier in the season, was chosen as left back for a match against Tottenham Hotspur. His performances in the position were such that he played left back in all but two of the remaining matches that season.

By the 1967–68 season, Pardoe was firmly established as the first choice left back. He missed just one match, when injury prevented him facing Leeds United in October. Manchester City mounted a challenge for the league title, with Pardoe involved in all the key matches, including a 4–1 win over Tottenham Hotspur that became known as the Ballet on Ice, and a 3–1 win away to reigning champions Manchester United. City went into the final match of the season, at Newcastle United's St James' Park, knowing a win would secure the championship. City, watched by a crowd including 20,000 travelling supporters won 4–3 and clinched the championship. Only captain Tony Book played more matches than Pardoe in the championship season.

Manchester City had a disappointing league season in 1968–69, but fared better in the FA Cup. Pardoe played every match as Manchester City reached the final, where they faced Leicester City. The Manchester club prevailed 1–0 courtesy of a goal by Neil Young.

Pardoe scored the winning goal for City in the 1970 League Cup Final, beating West Bromwich Albion. The match finished 2–1.

Pardoe's career was threatened in December 1970. City beat United 4-1 in the Manchester derby at Old Trafford, but the match is even more remembered for the tackle by George Best on Pardoe that broke Pardoe's right leg, with doctors at one point fearing that the limb would have to be amputated. The injury sidelined Pardoe for nearly two years, and by the time he returned Willie Donachie had established himself as first choice left back. From this point his first-team appearances were limited, mainly playing at right back during his spells in the side.

In total Pardoe played for Manchester City 380 times, scoring 22 goals. His versatility meant that centre-half was the only outfield position he never played for the club. He retired in 1976, taking up a position in the club's coaching staff, and remained at the club for a further 16 years. Youth development was a focus of his coaching, which included a strong contribution to the development of the team which won the 1986 FA Youth Cup. His association with the club ended in 1992 when Peter Reid abruptly sacked him, along with longstanding physio Roy Bailey. During the 2005–06 season he worked in the media, summarising Manchester City matches on BBC GMR.

== Personal life ==
Pardoe was the cousin of his former teammate Alan Oakes, with several other relations having played professionally. His daughter Charlotte is married to Scott Doyle, the son of former teammate Mike Doyle, and his grandson Tommy Doyle plays for Wolverhampton Wanderers, as well as having represented England's U-17 and U-16 national sides.

Pardoe died on 26 May 2020, aged 73.

== Honours ==
Manchester City

- Football League First Division: 1967–68
- FA Cup: 1968–69
- Football League Cup: 1969–70; runner-up: 1973–74
- FA Charity Shield: 1968
- UEFA Cup Winners' Cup: 1969–70
