= 1969 FA Cup final =

English football match

- Match programme cover
- Event: 1968–69 FA Cup
Leicester City	Manchester City
0	1
- Date: 26 April 1969
- Venue: Wembley Stadium, London
- Man of the Match: Allan Clarke (Leicester City)
- Referee: George McCabe (Sheffield)
- Attendance: 100,000

The 1969 FA Cup final was the final match of the 1968–69 staging of English football's primary cup competition, the Football Association Challenge Cup, better known as the FA Cup. The match was contested between Leicester City and Manchester City at Wembley Stadium in London on Saturday 26 April 1969. This was the first FA Cup final since 1951 to take place in the month of April. Three-time winners Manchester City were appearing in their seventh final, whereas Leicester City were seeking to win the competition for the first time, having lost three previous finals.

Each team won five ties to reach the final, and overcame one of the 1968 finalists (West Bromwich Albion and Everton) at the semi-final stage. As Leicester City were battling to avoid relegation and Manchester City were reigning league champions, the Manchester club were strong favourites. The match finished 1–0 to Manchester City. The goal came in the 24th minute, scored by Neil Young. The victory was Manchester City's fourth FA Cup win, and the first time the club had won a major trophy in successive seasons.

== Route to the final ==
Leicester City
Round	Opposition	Score
3rd	Barnsley (a)	1–1
3rd	Barnsley (h)	2–1
4th	Millwall (a)	1–0
5th	Liverpool (h)	0–0
5th	Liverpool (a)	1–0
6th	Mansfield Town (a)	1–0
Semi-final	West Bromwich Albion (n)	1–0

As both Leicester City and Manchester City were First Division clubs, they entered the competition in the third round.

=== Leicester City ===
Leicester City started their cup run against Barnsley, but required a replay to overcome their Third Division opponents 2–1. The first Leicester goal was controversial, as the referee overruled his linesman, who had flagged for a foul. Barnsley equalised with a penalty, but Leicester quickly retook the lead. Later in the second half Leicester claimed a third goal, but the referee adjudged that the ball had not crossed the line. A 1–0 win at Millwall followed.

In the fifth round, Leicester City faced Liverpool. The match was postponed six times before it eventually took place on 1 March. A 0–0 draw meant a replay at Anfield. Andy Lochhead gave the Foxes the lead on 34 minutes. Five minutes later McArthurs's handball gave Liverpool a penalty, but Peter Shilton saved Tommy Smith's spot-kick. Liverpool attacked for much of the second half, but Leicester held out to win 1–0. The quarter final saw a trip to Mansfield Town, who had knocked out clubs from five different divisions. On a pitch described by The Times' Geoffrey Green as "resembling a glutinous swamp", Leicester won 1–0. The goal was a header by Rodney Fern from a Len Glover cross. The semi-final, played at Hillsborough Stadium, was against cup-holders West Bromwich Albion. In a game of few chances, Allan Clarke scored from an Andy Lochhead knockdown with four minutes remaining. Leicester City gained their fourth 1–0 win of the competition and reached the final.

=== Manchester City ===
Manchester City
Round	Opposition	Score
3rd	Luton Town (h)	1–0
4th	Newcastle United (a)	0–0
4th	Newcastle United (h)	2–0
5th	Blackburn Rovers (a)	4–1
6th	Tottenham Hotspur (h)	1–0
Semi-final	Everton (n)	1–0

Manchester City's first tie was against Luton Town of the Third Division, which City won 1–0, Francis Lee the scorer. In the fourth round, the club were drawn away to Newcastle United, one of only two top-flight clubs with an away draw. The match finished 0–0, and so was replayed at Maine Road. Manchester City won 2–0, but had to play much of the match with 10 men after Mike Summerbee was sent off. Like Leicester's fifth round tie, Manchester City's match at Blackburn Rovers' Ewood Park was delayed multiple times due to poor weather. When it was eventually played Manchester City were comfortable 4–1 winners. In the sixth round, Manchester City were drawn at home to Tottenham Hotspur. The match was closely contested; in his autobiography, City's Mike Doyle described it as the hardest match of the whole cup run. As in the third round, City won 1–0 thanks to a Francis Lee goal.

The semi-final, against Everton, was played at Villa Park. Everton were renowned for their powerful midfield of Ball, Harvey and Kendall, but opted to play more defensively than usual. Manchester City nevertheless paid special attention to this area, and instructed David Connor to man-mark Ball. Mike Doyle suffered an injury in the first half, and spent 20 minutes off the field. City had the better of the game, but goalscoring chances were missed by Lee and Young. With little time remaining, Young forced a corner. Young took the corner himself, from which teenager Tommy Booth scored the game's only goal.

== Build-up ==
Leicester City were making their fourth cup final appearance, and their third of the decade, having lost on all three previous occasions (in 1949, 1961 and 1963). Manchester City were appearing in the final for the seventh time. They had won the cup three times previously (in 1904, 1934 and 1956), and had been beaten in the final three times (in 1926, 1933 and 1955). The clubs had met in the FA Cup in each of the preceding three seasons. In 1966 Manchester City won a fifth round tie 1–0 after a replay, and won again in the third round in 1967. In the 1967–68 season Leicester finally prevailed. After a 0–0 draw at Maine Road, Leicester City came back from 2–0 down at Filbert Street to win 4–3.

Leicester City named a 14-man squad before travelling to a training camp in Bisham on the Tuesday. Manchester City travelled south on the Thursday, staying in Weybridge. Leicester had fitness doubts over Dave Gibson, Len Glover and John Sjoberg, but initially expected all three to be available for the final. However, in a practice match against Brentford, Sjoberg had to leave the field with a groin injury. His place in the team was taken by Alan Woollett. Manchester City manager Joe Mercer named his team for the final several days in advance. Glyn Pardoe missed training on Monday 21st with a leg injury, but after the fitness of Pardoe, Tony Coleman and Alan Oakes was tested in a practice match, all three were passed fit.

Each club received 16,000 tickets for the final from the Football Association. The match was televised live by the BBC and ITV. Both broadcasters devoted several hours to match build-up, incorporating FA Cup-themed versions of other programmes, such as Cup Final It's a Knockout.

As the previous season's league champions, Manchester City were strong favourites, particularly as Leicester were embroiled in a struggle to avoid relegation from the First Division. The Times correspondent anticipated that the condition of the pitch would influence the match, stating that "if — as it is said — it is in a good, lush state Manchester will be happy. If, on the other hand, it proves to be heavy, then it could suit Leicester the better." On the day before the game Joe Mercer criticised the pitch, likening it to a cabbage patch.

== Match ==
At 21, Leicester's David Nish became the youngest ever captain of a cup finalist. His opposite number Tony Book became the third oldest at 35. Book had missed a large part of season through injury, but upon returning his impact was so great that he shared the award for the 1969 FWA Footballer of the Year.

As the teams prepared to leave their dressing rooms, Manchester City deliberately delayed their exit by a short period to play on any nerves the Leicester City players may have had. Manchester City coach Malcolm Allison was not permitted to take his place on the bench, as he was serving a touchline ban. Instead, he had to sit in the stand behind the dugout. Before kick-off, the players were introduced to the guest of honour, Princess Anne.

Fears that the contest would be a mismatch proved to be unfounded, with Leicester playing in a more attacking manner than anticipated. The Observer's Hugh McIvanney wrote: "Suggestions that Leicester would attempt to minimise the discrepancy in talents by a concentration on defensive spoiling were exposed as unjust...offering the deceptively languid dribbles of Clarke, the thoughtful passes of Roberts and Gibson and the thrustful running of Lochhead as proof that the skills were not all on one side." Neil Young and Tony Coleman both had early scoring chances for Manchester City, but missed the target. For Leicester City, a dribbling run by Clarke ended in a shot that was saved by Dowd, and a mishit shot by Len Glover was cleared off the goal-line by a defender. Manchester City scored midway through the first half. Mike Summerbee crossed the ball from wide on the right, and Young hit a left footed shot high into Peter Shilton's net. Few further chances occurred in the first half.

Just after half-time, Leicester City had their strongest scoring chance, when Andy Lochhead received a headed knockdown from Allan Clarke, but Lochhead's shot went high above the goal. A dominant period by Manchester City then followed, which included a chance for Colin Bell from a free-kick. Len Glover was forced to move into defence with his team under pressure, but was injured shortly afterward and had to be substituted. Defender Malcolm Manley came on in his place.

A poll of journalists named Allan Clarke as man of the match.

=== Summary ===
26 April 1969
15:00 BST

Leicester City	0–1	Manchester City
	Report	Young 24'

Wembley, London
Attendance: 100,000
Referee: George McCabe (South Yorkshire)

Leicester City	Manchester City

GK	1	(England) Peter Shilton
DF	2	(Wales) Peter Rodrigues
DF	3	(England) David Nish (c)
MF	4	(Scotland) Bobby Roberts
DF	5	(England) Alan Woollett
DF	6	(England) Graham Cross
MF	7	(England) Rodney Fern
MF	8	(Scotland) Dave Gibson
FW	9	(Scotland) Andy Lochhead
FW	10	(England) Allan Clarke
MF	11	(England) Lenny Glover	(substituted off) 70'
Substitutes:
DF	12	(Scotland) Malcolm Manley	(substituted on) 70'
Manager:
(Republic of Ireland) Frank O'Farrell

GK	1	(England) Harry Dowd
RB	2	(England) Tony Book (c)
LB	3	(England) Glyn Pardoe
CB	4	(England) Mike Doyle
CB	5	(England) Tommy Booth
CM	6	(England) Alan Oakes
RW	7	(England) Mike Summerbee
CM	8	(England) Colin Bell
FW	9	(England) Francis Lee
FW	10	(England) Neil Young
LW	11	(England) Tony Coleman
Substitutes:
DF	12	(England) David Connor
Manager:
(England) Joe Mercer

Match rules

- 90 minutes.
- 30 minutes of extra-time if necessary.
- Replay if scores still level.
- One named substitute.

== Post-match ==
The Manchester City team returned to Manchester the following evening. They travelled by train to Wilmslow, from where they undertook a 13-mile parade in an open-topped bus. 25,000 people lined the route, with a further 3,000 people in Albert Square, where the parade finished. Three days later, the team paraded the cup in front of their supporters before their match against West Ham United at Maine Road.

The good conduct of the supporters of both teams was praised in Parliament by MPs Barnett Janner and Tom Boardman.

Manchester City's cup was their fourth. In winning the trophy, Joe Mercer became the first person to win the league championship and FA Cup as both a captain and a manager. By winning the competition, Manchester City earned the right to compete in the 1969–70 European Cup Winners' Cup. City went on to win the Cup Winners' Cup, beating Górnik Zabrze 2–1 in the final. Leicester City continued to struggle in their remaining league matches and were relegated to the Second Division. Leicester became only the second club to reach a cup final and suffer relegation in the same season. By coincidence, the other club to have done so was Manchester City, who were subject to the same fate in 1926; and Wigan Athletic, who won the FA Cup in 2013 against Manchester City, but were relegated in the same season.

== Bibliography ==
- Book, Tony; David Clayton (2004). Maine Man. Mainstream publishing. ISBN 1-84018-812-X.
- Doyle, Mike; & Clayton, David (2006). Blue Blood: the Mike Doyle Story. Liverpool: Bluecoat. ISBN 1-904438-38-5.
- Goldstone, Phil; Saffer, David (2005). Manchester City Champions 1967/68. Stroud: Tempus. ISBN 978-0-7524-3611-1.
- Pawson, Tony (1972). 100 Years of the FA Cup. London: Heinemann. ISBN 0-330-23274-6.
- Penney, Ian (1996). Blue Heaven: Manchester City's Greatest Games. Edinburgh: Mainstream. ISBN 1-85158-872-8.
- Summerbee, Mike (2008). Mike Summerbee: The Autobiography. London: Century. ISBN 978-1-8460-5493-8.
- Tossell, David (2008). Big Mal: The High Life and hard Times of Malcolm Allison, Football Legend. Edinburgh: Mainstream. ISBN 978-1-84596-478-8.
- Ward, Andrew (1984). The Manchester City Story. Derby: Breedon. ISBN 0-907969-05-4.
