= Colin Barlow =

English footballer (1935–2018)

Personal information
- Full name: Colin James Barlow
- Date of birth: 14 November 1935
- Place of birth: Manchester, England
- Date of death: 19 December 2018 (aged 83)
- Position: Winger

Youth career
- 1953–1956: Manchester City

Senior career*
Years	Team	Apps	(Gls)
1956–1963	Manchester City	179	(78)
1963–1964	Oldham Athletic	6	(1)
1964–1965	Doncaster Rovers	3	(0)
Total		188	(79)
- * Club domestic league appearances and goals

Colin James Barlow (14 November 1935 – 19 December 2018) was an English professional footballer who played as a winger for Manchester City, Oldham Athletic and Doncaster Rovers.

== Club career ==
Barlow joined Manchester City as a schoolboy, turning professional in 1956. He made his first team debut on the opening day of the 1957–58 season, scoring the first goal in a 3–2 win against Chelsea at Stamford Bridge. He ended his first season with 17 goals in 40 appearances. The following season, he scored 18 goals, making him the club's top scorer for 1958–59. The 1959–60 season was his goal scoring peak, with 20 goals in 40 appearances. In 1962 he lost his first team place to Neil Young; following Young's debut he made only 19 further appearances for the club. When he left Manchester City he was the club's twelfth highest all-time goalscorer. As of 2007 he was eighteenth.

=== Later career ===
With first team opportunities limited at Manchester City, in August 1963 he followed manager Les McDowall to Oldham Athletic. He later played for Doncaster Rovers.

== Personal life ==
After finishing his playing career, Barlow moved into business. In 1994 this saw him return to football as part of Francis Lee's takeover of the club. Barlow became the club's first chief executive, and was a member of the board. He left the role in January 1997, stating that he wished to devote more time to his companies. He resigned as a director in December 1997, but retained his shareholding.

Barlow died on 19 December 2018 at the age of 83.
