= Malcolm Allison =

English footballer and manager (1927–2010)

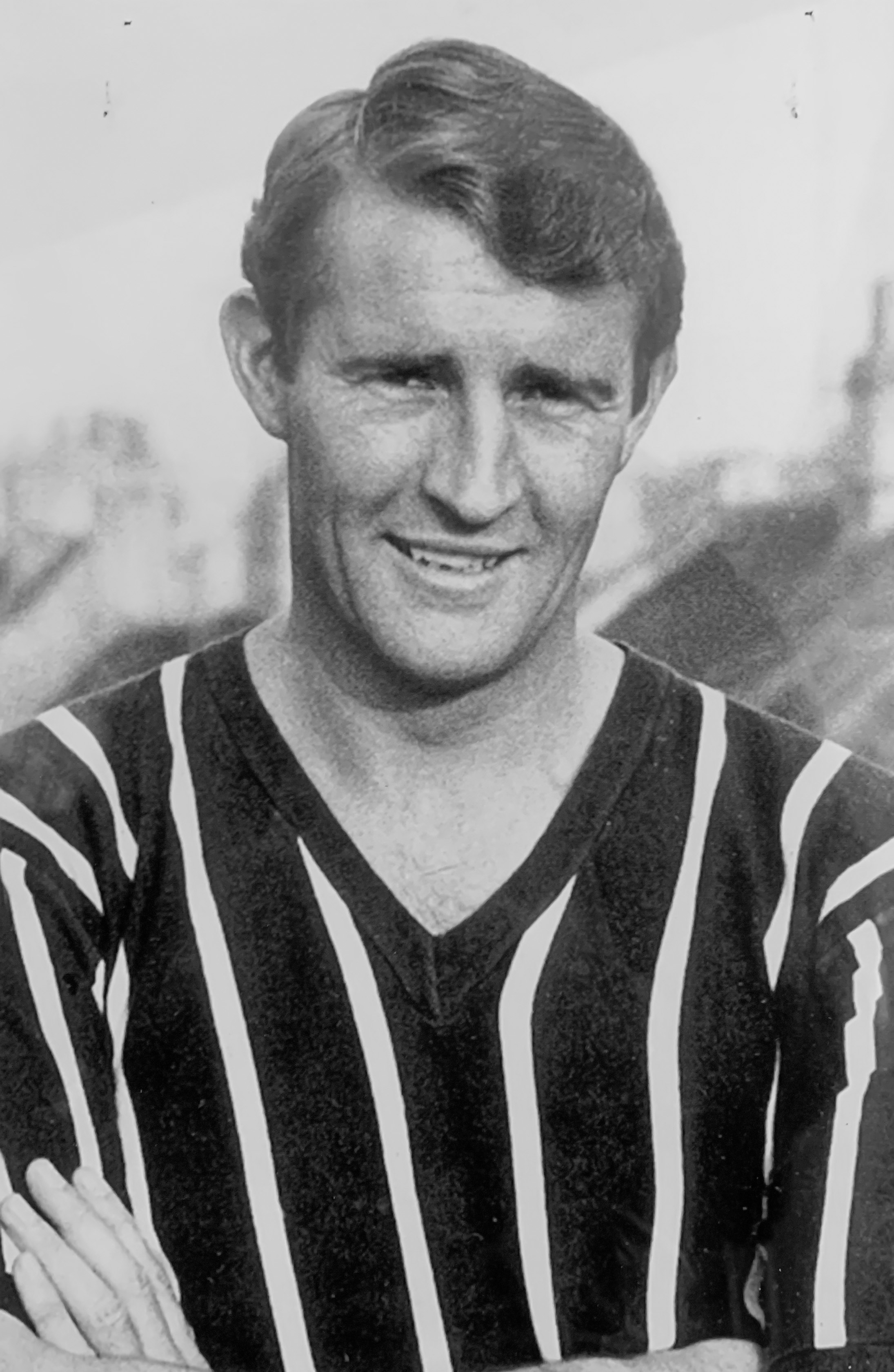
- Allison in 1962.

Personal information
- Full name: Malcolm Alexander Allison
- Date of birth: 5 September 1927
- Place of birth: Dartford, England
- Date of death: 14 October 2010 (aged 83)
- Place of death: Trafford, England
- Position: Centre half

Youth career
- –1945: Erith & Belvedere

Senior career*
| Years | Team | Apps | (Gls) |
| 1945–1951 | Charlton Athletic | 2 | (0) |
| 1951–1957 | West Ham United | 238 | (10) |
| 1960–1962 | Romford | 49 | (1) |
| Total | | 289 | (11) |

Managerial career
- 1963–1964: Bath City
- 1964: Toronto City
- 1964–1965: Plymouth Argyle
- 1965–1971: Manchester City (assistant)
- 1971–1973: Manchester City
- 1973–1976: Crystal Palace
- 1976–1977: Galatasaray
- 1978–1979: Plymouth Argyle
- 1979–1980: Manchester City
- 1980–1981: Crystal Palace
- 1981: Yeovil Town
- 1981–1982: Sporting CP
- 1982–1984: Middlesbrough
- 1984: Willington
- 1985–1986: Kuwait
- 1986–1988: Vitória de Setúbal
- 1988: SC Farense
- 1989: Fisher Athletic
- 1992–1993: Bristol Rovers
- * Club domestic league appearances and goals

"I'd been a professional for two and a half months and Malcolm had taught me everything I know.... When Malcolm was coaching schoolboys he took a liking to me when I don't think anyone else at West Ham saw anything special in me... I looked up to the man. It's not too strong to say I loved him."
Bobby Moore

Malcolm Alexander Allison (5 September 1927 – 14 October 2010) was an English football player and manager. Nicknamed "Big Mal", he was one of English football's most flamboyant and intriguing characters because of his panache, fedora and cigar, controversies off the pitch and outspoken nature.

Allison's managerial potential become apparent while in his youth at West Ham United, where he became a reliable defender and acted as a mentor to the younger players including future England World Cup winning captain Bobby Moore. His playing career was cut short in 1958 when he had to have a lung removed because of tuberculosis.

As a coach, he is remembered for assisting manager Joe Mercer in the transformation of the team he supported as a young boy – Manchester City. During the 1960s and early 1970s, Allison won six major trophies in seven years with Mercer. After Mercer left, he managed the club on two occasions whilst offering his managerial services for a third time in 1989. He also managed several other English clubs including Crystal Palace and Middlesbrough, as well as three in Portugal and the Kuwait national team.

== Early life ==
The son of an electrical engineer, Allison was born in Dartford in September 1927. He was educated at secondary modern schools rather than grammar school after deliberately failing the 11-plus exam so he could play football, not rugby.

== Playing career ==
Allison started his career with Charlton Athletic but struggled to make an impact on the pitch, playing just twice in six years. Matters off the pitch led to his transfer, after letting club coaches know that their training methods – which were normally nothing more than running up and down the terracing – were outdated.

Allison joined West Ham United in February 1951, after seven seasons at Charlton Athletic. At West Ham he gained experience not only as a footballer but also as a future coach, and he often stayed behind after training with anyone interested in football to discuss and devise new tactics.

A promising career as a centre-half was ended prematurely by a bout of tuberculosis as he fell ill after a game against Sheffield United on 16 September 1957 and had a lung removed in hospital. This turned out to be his last senior game for West Ham, and although he battled on in their reserve team he struggled with the inability to achieve full fitness. For a period he left football altogether, and worked first as a car salesman, then as a professional gambler and nightclub owner. He came back to football to play a final season for non-league Romford in 1963. He played briefly for Toronto City FC in May and June 1964 as the team's player-coach.

== Managerial career ==
Allison's first taste of coaching was at West Ham, where – under Ted Fenton – he took charge of coaching sessions and acted as mentor to a young Bobby Moore and was a leading figure in the establishment of the academy principles at the club. After gaining further experience of coaching at Cambridge University, Allison moved into management at non-league Bath City. He replaced the veteran Bob Hewson, who had retired. One of his first moves was to double the number of training sessions. The players, who held full-time jobs outside football, were required to train four times every week. Allison's first season as a manager was a moderate success; he led the club to a third-place finish in the league, and to a third round F.A.Cup tie with First Division Bolton Wanderers. City were leading 1–0 at Twerton Park until a late equaliser from the penalty spot. They lost the replay 3–0.

At the end of the English season Allison accepted an offer to coach in North America over the summer, with Toronto City. After a matter of weeks he was back in England. His success at Bath had alerted a number of Football League clubs, and in May 1964 he joined Plymouth Argyle, where he had been offered a £3,000 per annum salary. He soon returned to Bath to sign full-back Tony Book. However, Allison knew the Argyle board would be reluctant to permit the purchase of a player with no League experience, who was approaching his thirtieth birthday. Allison encouraged Book to doctor his birth certificate, making him appear two years younger.

=== Manchester City ===
Joe Mercer was named Manchester City manager in July 1965. As ill health had hindered him in his previous job as manager of Aston Villa, Mercer sought a younger, energetic man to be his assistant. He offered the position to Allison, whom he knew from coaching courses at Lilleshall. Allison was due to meet Raich Carter to discuss a position at Middlesbrough, but Mercer was able to arrange a meeting the day before, and persuaded Allison to accept his offer.

The Mercer–Allison era is believed to be the strongest in Manchester City's history before the 2010s. They were surprise winners of the First Division in 1967–68 against the odds, with some at a long 200–1 for City to win the league at the start of the season. In the following seasons they won the 1969 FA Cup, the 1970 League Cup and Cup Winners' Cup, with a team including Colin Bell, Mike Summerbee and Francis Lee. Allison turned down an offer to manage Juventus on the understanding that Mercer would move aside and let him become full-time Manchester City manager – however, Mercer steadfastly refused to stand down. Their relationship disintegrated and eventually Allison won the power struggle – Mercer was sidelined and quit to take over at Coventry City in the summer of 1972. Allison was left in sole charge at City, but the team struggled and in March 1973 he resigned.

=== Crystal Palace ===
On 31 March 1973, Allison was appointed manager of Crystal Palace. His salary was £13,000 a year, on a five-year contract. The club had struggled in the top flight throughout the 1972–73 season and he replaced Bert Head. Despite his arrival Palace were relegated, losing five out of their last seven games.

Allison changed Palace’s nickname from ‘The Glaziers’ to ‘The Eagles’ and replaced the club’s claret-and-blue colours, which had been used for 68 years.[1] A red-and-blue striped home kit was introduced, followed later by an all-white strip with a red-and-blue sash. The following season, 1973–74, was even more disastrous because of a second successive relegation. Allison completely restructured the side in an attempt to halt the club's decline and he angered many fans with his decision to replace favourite John Jackson in the Palace goal. Allison's larger than life image was a mixed blessing in Division Three for it raised hopes and aspirations of supporters while also serving to motivate other clubs when they visited Selhurst Park. Palace defender Jim Cannon said: "Malcolm Allison put Palace on the map. No other man could single-handedly take a club from the First Division to the Third Division and still become an instant hero".

However 1975–76 ended up the most successful season for Allison at Selhurst Park as he spurred Palace on to an FA Cup semi-final appearance, after brilliant victories against higher league opposition in the shape of Leeds United, Chelsea and Sunderland. The eventual winners Southampton proved too strong in the semi-final which was played at Stamford Bridge. The FA Cup run was also notable for the first appearance of Allison's trademark fedora hat during a third-round game at Scarborough and his use of the sweeper system in football which, at the time, was a relatively new idea.

With the team failing to reach Wembley and win promotion (despite building up a big lead in the league table in the early part of the season) Allison resigned in May 1976. He returned to the club in 1980–81 for a two-month period in a doomed attempt to avoid relegation from the top flight.

=== Return to Manchester City ===
In 1979, Allison was offered the chance to return to Manchester City by then-chairman Peter Swales. City's only success since Allison left in 1972 was League Cup victory in 1976, although the club had been doing reasonably well under long-term manager Tony Book, finishing second in the league in the 1976–77 season and runners-up in the League Cup in 1974.

Allison was given a sizeable war chest to build his team — this time without Joe Mercer. Allison controversially sold crowd favourites Peter Barnes and Gary Owen and replaced them with players including Michael Robinson and Steve Daley – who became the British transfer record for £1,450,000m.

Daley turned out to be an expensive flop, and Allison always said that he had agreed a much lower fee with the Wolves manager for Daley. Allison later said Swales intervened on a chairman to chairman basis and secured the transfer instantly but at a much higher, possibly rip-off price. Allison later admitted on his first meeting with chairman Swales: "I looked at him, saw the comb-over, the England blazer and the suede shoes and thought 'this isn't going to work'". Allison left a year later in 1980 with City struggling in the league. He later got involved in a verbal scrap with his successor and fellow maverick manager, John Bond.

=== Overseas ===
Allison also managed overseas, in Türkiye with Galatasaray (1976–1977), and in Portugal with Sporting. With the Lisbon club he won the league championship and the Portuguese Cup in 1981–1982. That would be the last Championship title won by Sporting until the 1999–2000 season, which meant that Allison is fondly remembered by Sporting fans.

== Personality ==
Allison was remembered as one of the most exuberant characters in football. During his time as assistant to Joe Mercer at Manchester City, his reputation for unpredictability was well known. When Mercer was stopped by police in his car for erratic driving in the early hours of the morning after leaving a club function at Maine Road, upon winding down his window Mercer quipped to the police officers: "OK chaps, what's Malcolm done now?"

Whilst at City, Allison enjoyed winding up rivals Manchester United. At a reception, he called Matt Busby "Matt Baby" and when City beat United 4–1 in December 1970 he walked over to the Stretford End and held four fingers aloft to signify City's goal tally. Allison later said he had hired a steeplejack to lower the flag on top of Old Trafford's main stand to half-mast.

Allison's outspoken nature and womanising were of great interest to tabloid newspapers and it was reputed that he had relationships with Christine Keeler of the Profumo scandal, singer Dorothy Squires and two Miss UKs. In 1976, Allison received a Football Association disrepute charge after a News of the World photograph appeared showing him in the Crystal Palace players' bath with porn star Fiona Richmond whom he had invited to a training session. Then Crystal Palace player, Terry Venables later said of the incident, "I was in the bath with all the players and we heard the whisper that she was coming down the corridor. So far, so good. We all leapt out and hid, because we knew there'd be photos and that wouldn't go down too well. Malcolm and Fiona dropped everything and got in the bath."

== After football ==
In 1995, Allison was featured in a The Cook Report episode on unpaid child maintenance, where it was found that he paid his ex wife Sally only six months wages for child support in over a decade. In 2001 it was revealed by his son that Allison was suffering from alcoholism and in 2009 that he had developed dementia.

In January 2007, Crystal Palace fans organised a tribute to Allison, which they named 'Fedora Day'. Fans set up a campaign on www.cpfc.org, an unofficial forum dedicated to the club, to mark the 31st anniversary of the famous FA Cup run which Allison masterminded. The date chosen was that of the game against Preston North End in the 4th Round of the FA Cup on 27 January 2007. Fans sporting Allison's favoured Fedoras smoked cigars and drank champagne while cheering on their side. This generated major national press coverage. Crystal Palace – managed by Peter Taylor, a star of the 1976 side – were unable to match their predecessors and were knocked out of the cup 2–0.

Allison died in a nursing home on 14 October 2010 at the age of 83. He had six children. His funeral took place on 27 October, with the cortege passing the City of Manchester Stadium on its way to a service at the Southern Cemetery. Around 300 people gathered to pay their respects and a round of applause from the assembled crowd greeted the arrival of the cars. A sky-blue Manchester City scarf was draped over his coffin next to an ice bucket containing a bottle of Moet et Chandon champagne.

=== Legacy ===
Allison was known as a great innovator in revolutionising training methods in English football.

== Quotes ==
- "A lot of hard work went into this defeat."
- "You're not a real manager unless you've been sacked."
- "John Bond has blackened my name with his insinuations about the private lives of football managers. Both my wives are upset." – Allison on his successor at Manchester City in 1980.
- "A lot of people in football don't have much time for the press; they say they're amateurs."
- "I think I'm one of the luckiest guys in the world because I had a job I loved doing."
- "We'll terrify the cowards of Europe" – Allison following Manchester City's European Cup qualification in 1968.

== Managerial statistics ==
Managerial record by team and tenure
| Team | From | To | Record | | | | |
| Team | From | To | P | W | D | L | Win % |
|---|---|---|---|---|---|---|---|
| Plymouth Argyle | 1 May 1964 | 30 April 1965 | 42 | 16 | 8 | 18 | 38.1 |
| Manchester City | 7 October 1971 | 30 March 1973 | 43 | 14 | 12 | 17 | 32.6 |
| Crystal Palace | 30 March 1973 | 19 May 1976 | 146 | 52 | 45 | 49 | 35.6 |
| Plymouth Argyle | 16 March 1978 | 5 January 1979 | 34 | 12 | 12 | 10 | 35.3 |
| Manchester City | 16 July 1979 | 1 October 1980 | 50 | 12 | 17 | 21 | 24.0 |
| Crystal Palace | 1 December 1980 | 1 February 1981 | 9 | 1 | 3 | 5 | 11.1 |
| Yeovil Town | 1 February 1981 | 14 February 1981 | 4 | 0 | 1 | 3 | 0.0 |
| Sporting CP | 1981 | 1982 | 39 | 28 | 8 | 3 | 71.8 |
| Middlesbrough | 23 October 1982 | 28 March 1984 | 70 | 21 | 23 | 26 | 30.0 |
| Bristol Rovers | 1 August 1992 | 1 March 1993 | 36 | 8 | 8 | 20 | 22.2 |
| Total | | | 434 | 136 | 129 | 169 | 31.3 |

== Honours ==
=== Player ===
West Ham United

- Football League Second Division: 1957–58

=== Coach ===
Manchester City (as assistant)

- Football League First Division: 1967–68
- Football League Second Division: 1965–66
- FA Cup: 1969
- League Cup: 1970
- Charity Shield: 1968; runner-up: 1969
- European Cup Winners' Cup: 1970

Manchester City

- Charity Shield: 1972

Sporting CP

- Primeira Liga: 1981–82
- Cup of Portugal: 1981–82
