= Eric Jennings =

English football referee (1923–1988)

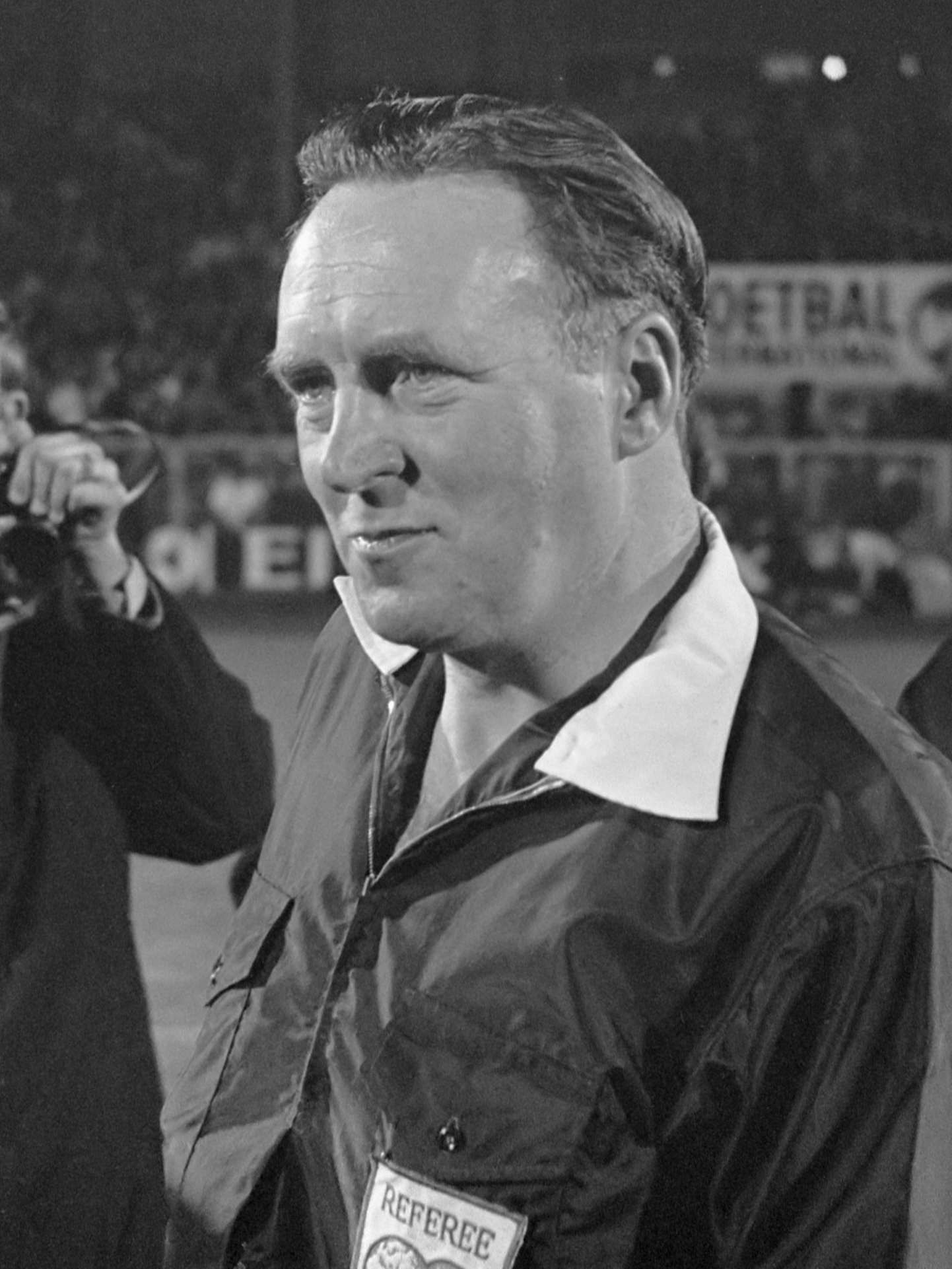
- Jennings in 1969
- Full name: Eric Thomas Jennings
- Born: 22 January 1923; Worcester, England
- Died: June 1988 (aged 65); Hereford, England

Domestic
Years	League	Role
1954–1970	Football League	Referee

International
Years	League	Role
1966–1970	FIFA listed	Referee

Eric Thomas Jennings (22 January 1923 – June 1988) was an English football referee, who operated in the Football League and for FIFA. In his refereeing years he was based in Stourbridge in the West Midlands. Outside football he was employed as a technical representative for a water treatment company.

== Career ==
Jennings was promoted to the Football League referees List in 1954, aged only 31.

By the mid-1960s he was a leading English official and this was marked by his ascendancy to the FIFA List in 1966. His experience of officiating between nations was limited mainly to friendly matches, which included East Germany's 2–0 win against Romania at the Stadion der Freundschaft on 21 September 1966, and the 2–2 draw between the Republic of Ireland and Poland at Dalymount Park on 15 May 1968. He also handled games in the Home International competition of the time, such as Northern Ireland versus Scotland at Windsor Park, Belfast, on 18 April 1970.

On 13 November 1968 he went to Amsterdam to referee Ajax versus Fenerbahçe in a European Cup second round tie, but bettered this later that season on 13 April 1969 with a return to the Dutch club for its semi-final against Spartak Trnava.

The following season (1969–70) was his last before retirement, and he was awarded the FA Cup Final between Chelsea and Leeds at Wembley on 11 April 1970 as the climax to his long and successful career. This game ended in a draw, and Jennings also refereed the replay at Old Trafford. Jennings allowed rough play by both sides throughout, playing the advantage to its full extent. He booked only one player, Ian Hutchinson of Chelsea, during the game.

It was to be another seven years until the Final was given to a referee in his retirement season, when Bob Matthewson handled the Manchester United versus Liverpool game. Jennings' career also overlapped with another top League and FIFA referee from his home town - Ken Burns.

Preceded by George McCabe	FA Cup Final Referee; 1970	Succeeded by Norman Burtenshaw
