= Neil Young (footballer, born 1944) =

English footballer

Personal information
- Full name: Neil James Young
- Date of birth: 17 February 1944
- Place of birth: Fallowfield, Manchester, England
- Date of death: 3 February 2011 (aged 66)
- Height: 6 ft 0 in (1.83 m)
- Positions: Inside forward; winger

Youth career
- 1959–1961: Manchester City

Senior career*
Years	Team	Apps	(Gls)
1961–1972	Manchester City	334	(86)
1972–1974	Preston North End	68	(18)
1974–1975	Rochdale	13	(4)
Total		415	(108)

International career
- England Youth
- * Club domestic league appearances and goals

Neil James Young (17 February 1944 – 3 February 2011) was an English footballer who made more than 400 appearances in the Football League playing as a striker for Manchester City, Preston North End and Rochdale.

In total, Young scored 86 goals from 334 League games for Manchester City, scored the only goal in the 1969 FA Cup Final, and scored as City won the 1970 European Cup Winners' Cup Final. Transferred to Preston North End for £48,000 during the 1971–72 season, he made 68 League appearances and scored 18 goals for the Deepdale club before finishing his senior career with Rochdale, where he spent the 1974–75 season.

== Career ==
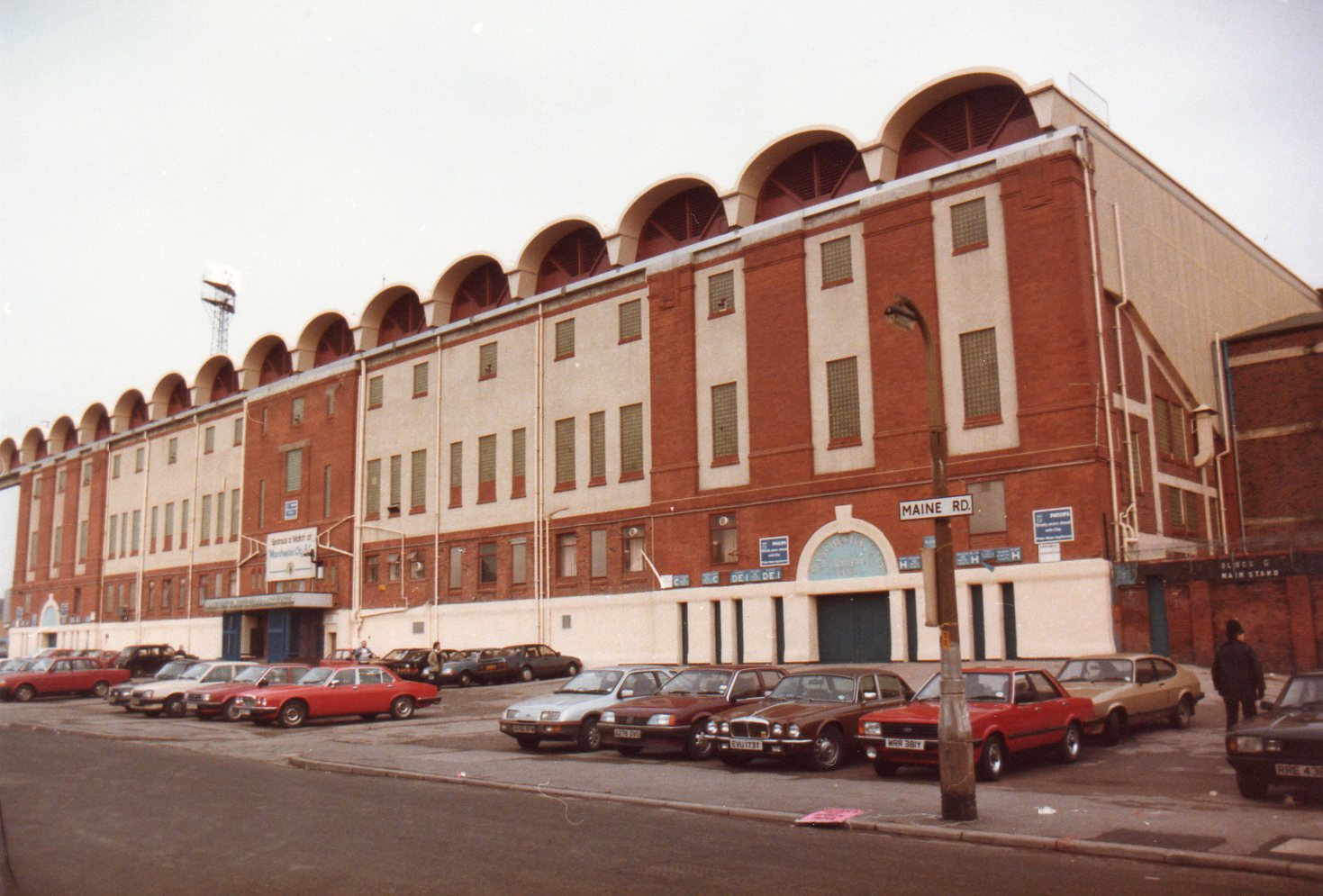
Young played at Maine Road for eleven years.

Young was born in Fallowfield, Manchester, where he lived with his parents and older brother Chris. His house was half a mile from Manchester City's Maine Road ground, which was visible from the bedroom window. As a schoolboy he played for Manchester Boys, facing opponents who were two years older. After catching the eye of scout Harry Godwin, Young signed for Manchester City as an apprentice in 1959, turning down the opportunity to join Manchester United. Around this time he was capped by England at youth level. He turned professional in July 1960, and made his first team debut in November 1961, in a 2–1 defeat against Aston Villa at Villa Park. After breaking into the team for the first time, Young played every match in the remainder of the 1961–62 season. He scored his first goal for the club on 23 December 1961, in a 3–0 home win against Ipswich Town. He finished his first season with 11 goals in 26 appearances.

Young's first full season was not a successful one for Manchester City; the team struggled to find form throughout. A four match unbeaten run in April, in which Young scored a winning goal against Bolton Wanderers, gave hope, but on the final day of the season Manchester City were relegated to the Second Division. For the following two seasons Young continued to be a regular first team player, though he missed the first two months of the 1964–65 season. Manchester City did not come close to promotion, and their 11th-place finish in 1965 was at that point the lowest in the club's history. Manager George Poyser departed in April 1965, and in July 1965 his replacement, Joe Mercer, joined the club, along with coach Malcolm Allison.

Young missed the start of the 1965–66 season with an illness that resulted in a tonsillectomy. He marked his return to the team with two goals against Coventry City. Up until this point in his career, Young had usually played on the left wing. However, encouraged by Mercer and Allison to shoot more frequently, his position began to vary. Against Leyton Orient, Young was deployed as an inside forward, and scored a hat-trick. He also played inside-forward in an FA Cup tie against Leicester City, and scored the winning goal against a team from the division above. By January, Manchester City were top of the Second Division. The club only lost one match in the remainder of the season, and won the Second Division Championship by a five-point margin. Young finished as the club's highest goalscorer, with 17 goals.

Manchester City returned to the First Division for the 1966–67 season, and Young remained a key player. Before Manchester City's game against Leeds United, Leeds manager Don Revie, known for his meticulous scouting of opposition teams, identified Young as a particular threat in a Grandstand interview. Operating mainly on the wing, Young scored less frequently than in the previous season, with 7 goals in 45 appearances.

Manchester City finished the 1966–67 season in mid-table, and continued in a similar vein at the start of the 1967–68 season, failing to win in their first three matches. A tactical switch saw Young and Mike Summerbee moved inside, and Young scored two goals in City's first win of the season, 4–2 against Southampton. Four more wins followed immediately, including a 2–0 win against Newcastle United in which Young scored a goal and missed a penalty. Young remained at inside-forward for the rest of the season. Following the arrival of striker Francis Lee and a long unbeaten run, Manchester City entered the New Year as potential title contenders. In mid-March, a 5–1 win against Fulham in which Young scored two goals took Manchester City top of the table. The lead changed hands several times in the following six weeks, but as the teams entered the final round of fixtures, Manchester City travelled to Newcastle knowing a win would guarantee the championship. Young scored twice and had another disallowed as Manchester City won 4–3 to win the title, the first major honour of Young's career. Young also finished the season as the club's highest goalscorer with 20 goals.

The following season, Manchester City did not challenge for the title. However, they found more success in the FA Cup. Young played in every round as the club reached the 1969 FA Cup Final. The opponents in the final were Leicester City. As Leicester were struggling against relegation Manchester City were strong favourites. However, the game was a close affair. Midway through the first half, Mike Summerbee crossed the ball from the right, and Young hit a left foot shot past Peter Shilton into the roof of the net. The match finished 1–0, Young's goal winning the Cup for Manchester City.

Cup success continued in 1969–70. The club reached and won the League Cup Final, though Young, who had played in all but one of the preceding rounds, was left out of the team for the final. A second final followed a month later, this time in European competition in the form of the European Cup Winners' Cup. City faced Polish club Górnik Zabrze in the final, held at Prater Stadium in Vienna. Young scored the opening goal, from a rebound after a save by Hubert Kostka. Shortly before half-time Young was fouled in the penalty area by Kostka, and Francis Lee scored the resulting penalty. City won the match 2–1 to become the first English team to win a European and domestic trophy within the same season.

In late 1970, Young's brother, Chris died aged 31, an event which affected Young deeply. His performances for Manchester City suffered as a result. He played approximately half the matches in the 1970–71 season, scoring only two goals. In the following season, he featured only rarely, and made his last appearance for the club on 16 October 1971, as a substitute against Leeds United.

In total, Young scored 86 goals from 334 league games for Manchester City. He was transferred to Second Division club Preston North End for £48,000 during the 1971–72 season. He made his debut for the club in a 0–0 draw against Birmingham City. He made 68 league appearances and scored 18 goals for the Deepdale club, but left after the club were relegated in the 1973–74 season. He finished his senior career with Rochdale, where he spent the 1974–75 season.

Young, widely regarded as one of Manchester City's most important players of the modern era, though not as celebrated nationally as teammates Colin Bell, Francis Lee and Mike Summerbee, was inducted into the Manchester City Hall of Fame in 2008.

== Personal life ==
Young married his first wife, Margaret, when he was 19. The couple had a son and two daughters, and divorced in 1982. He also had a daughter with his second wife, Susan. Young married his third wife, Carmen, in 2003, having lived with her since 1989.

After retiring from football Young had many different jobs, including removals, managing a sports shop, delivering milk, working in a supermarket, and selling insurance. In his spare time he maintained his fitness by playing badminton, and after winning local tournaments, played the sport for Cheshire. During much of this period he struggled financially, to the point where he had to sell the family home and move in with his mother. Deeply depressed at this point in his life, he attempted suicide. From the mid-1990s Young coached school football teams in the area around his Cheshire home.

Young was diagnosed with terminal cancer in late 2010. Following a supporter campaign, Manchester City dedicated their FA Cup tie at Leicester on 9 January 2011 to Young. Supporters wore red and black (the colours City wore in the 1969 final against Leicester), with proceeds from specially made scarves being split between Young and Wythenshawe Hospital. He died on 3 February 2011, just two weeks shy of his 67th birthday.

== Career statistics ==
Appearances and goals by club, season and competition
Club	Season	League			FA Cup		League Cup		Total	
Club	Season	Division	Apps	Goals	Apps	Goals	Apps	Goals	Apps	Goals
Manchester City	1961–62	First Division	24	10	2	1	0	0	26	11
Manchester City	1962–63	First Division	31	5	1	0	6	1	32	6
Manchester City	1963–64	Second Division	37	5	1	0	5	1	43	6
Manchester City	1964–65	Second Division	31	8	1	0	1	1	33	9
Manchester City	1965–66	Second Division	35	14	7	3	2	0	49	17
Manchester City	1966–67	First Division	38	4	5	2	2	1	45	7
Manchester City	1967–68	First Division	40	19	4	1	4	1	48	21
Manchester City	1968–69	First Division	40	14	7	2	2	0	49	16
Manchester City	1969–70	First Division	29	6	2	1	5	1	36	8
Manchester City	1970–71	First Division	24	1	3	0	1	0	28	1
Manchester City	1971–72	First Division	5	0	0	0	0	0	5	0
Manchester City	Total		334	86	33	10	28	6	395	102
Preston North End	1972–73	Second Division								
Preston North End	1973–74	Second Division								
Rochdale	1974–75	Fourth Division	13	4					13	4
Career total			347	90	33	10	28	6	408	106

== Honours ==
Manchester City

- Football League First Division: 1967–68
- Football League Second Division: 1965–66
- FA Cup: 1968–69
- FA Charity Shield: 1968–69
- UEFA Cup Winners' Cup: 1969–70

== Bibliography ==
- Goldstone, Phil; Saffer, David (2005). Manchester City Champions 1967/68. Stroud: Tempus. ISBN 0-7524-3611-2.
- Hayes, Dean (2006). The Who's Who of Preston North End. Derby: Breedon. ISBN 1-85983-516-3.
- James, Gary (2006). Manchester City – The Complete Record. Derby: Breedon. ISBN 1-85983-512-0.
- Penney, Ian (1995). The Maine Road Encyclopedia. Edinburgh: Mainstream. ISBN 1-85158-710-1.
- Penney, Ian (2008). Manchester City: The Mercer-Allison Years. Derby: Breedon. ISBN 978-1-85983-608-8.
- Tossell, David (2008). Big Mal: The High Life and hard Times of Malcolm Allison, Football Legend. Edinburgh: Mainstream. ISBN 978-1-84596-478-8.
- Ward, Andrew (1984). The Manchester City Story. Derby: Breedon. ISBN 0-907969-05-4.
- Young, Neil; Friend, Dante (2004). Catch a Falling Star: the autobiography of Neil Young. Manchester: Empire. ISBN 1-901746-43-7.
