= George McCabe =

English football referee (1922–2001)

- Born: 13 March 1922; Sheffield, Yorkshire, England
- Died: January 2001 (aged 78); Sheffield, Yorkshire, England
- Occupation: Association football referee
- Known for: 1966 FIFA World Cup

George McCabe (13 March 1922 – January 2001) was an English association football referee, who officiated at the 1966 World Cup and in an FA Cup Final. He became a Football League referee in 1954 and an international referee in 1960. Throughout his league career he sent off only three players. Outside football he was the director of a Sheffield engineering company.

== Career ==
McCabe, though awarded the 1969 FA Cup Final in his final match in England, is perhaps more well known for his handling of the Brazil versus Portugal World Cup match played at Goodison Park, Liverpool, on 19 July 1966, in which he was assisted by Wales' Leo Callaghan and England's Ken Dagnall.

During that game he failed to send João Morais from the field of play after a double foul on Pelé, being overall complacent with the Portuguese team's rough play against the Brazilian star. In 2010, The Telegraph listed it among the 10 worst refereeing errors in World Cup history.

The official Sheffield United website mentions his death when crediting him with being co-founder (along with Derek Dooley) of the "Senior Blades Club", for over-60 supporters.

Preceded by Leo Callaghan	FA Cup Final Referee; 1969	Succeeded by Eric Jennings
