= Brian Purcell =

Welsh footballer

Personal information
- Date of birth: 23 November 1938
- Place of birth: Swansea, Wales
- Date of death: 20 January 1969 (aged 30)
- Place of death: Hereford, England
- Position: Centre half

Youth career
- –1959: Waun Wen

Senior career*
Years	Team	Apps	(Gls)
1959–1968	Swansea Town	165	(1)
1968–1969	Hereford United		
- * Club domestic league appearances and goals

Brian Purcell (23 November 1938 – 20 January 1969) was a Welsh professional footballer who played for Swansea Town between 1959 and 1968, making 165 league appearances. Purcell also played for Waun Wen and Hereford United. Purcell died in a car crash on 20 January 1969, alongside Roy Evans.
