= Roy Evans (footballer, born 1943) =

Welsh footballer

Personal information
- Full name: Royston Sidney Evans
- Date of birth: 5 July 1943
- Place of birth: Swansea, Wales
- Date of death: 20 January 1969 (aged 25)
- Place of death: Hereford, England
- Position: Right back

Youth career
- –1962: Swansea Town

Senior career*
| Years | Team | Apps | (Gls) |
| 1962–1968 | Swansea Town | 214 | (7) |
| 1968–1969 | Hereford United | | |

International career
| 1964 | Wales | 1 | (0) |
- * Club domestic league appearances and goals

Royston Sidney Evans (5 July 1943 – 20 January 1969) was a Welsh international footballer who played professionally for Swansea Town between 1962 and 1968, making 214 league appearances. Evans also played for Hereford United. Evans died in a car crash on 20 January 1969, alongside Brian Purcell.
