= Mike Summerbee =

English footballer (born 1942)

Mike Summerbee OBE
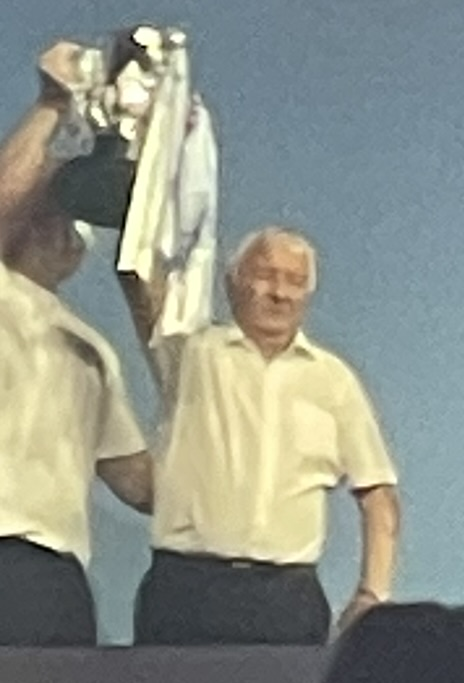
- Summerbee in 2026

Personal information
- Date of birth: 15 December 1942 (age 83)
- Place of birth: Preston, England
- Positions: Winger; forward

Senior career*
Years	Team	Apps	(Gls)
1959–1965	Swindon Town	218	(40)
1965–1975	Manchester City	357	(47)
1975–1976	Burnley	51	(0)
1976	Blackpool	3	(0)
1977–1979	Stockport County	87	(6)
1980	Mossley	0	(0)
Total		716	(93)

International career
1968–1973	England	8	(1)

Managerial career
- 1978–1979: Stockport County (player-manager)
Medal record
Representing England
UEFA European Championship
Third place	1968 Italy
- * Club domestic league appearances and goals

Michael George Summerbee OBE (born 15 December 1942) is an English former footballer, who played as a forward in the successful Manchester City side of the late 1960s and early 1970s.

== Club career ==
Summerbee was born in Preston, Lancashire, and raised in Cheltenham, Gloucestershire. He attended Naunton Park Secondary Modern School where he was influenced by sports teacher, Arnold Wills, with whom he was publicly reunited 50 years later when Summerbee was Guest of Honour at the 150th anniversary celebrations of Cheltenham YMCA, to which both had belonged in their youth. Summerbee made his league debut playing for Swindon Town in 1959 at the age of 16. He made more than 200 appearances for the Wiltshire club, scoring 40 goals. In 1965 Manchester City manager Joe Mercer signed Summerbee for a fee of £35,000. In his first Manchester City season, Summerbee started every match, the only Manchester City player to do so that season.

Playing on the right wing, Summerbee was one of the most influential players in the Manchester City side which won four trophies in three seasons from 1968 to 1970. Something of a practical joker, Summerbee (or "Buzzer" as teammates nicknamed him) was also known for a fiery temperament, a trait described by teammate Francis Lee as "retaliating first". Summerbee left Manchester City in June 1975, moving to Burnley, for a £25,000 fee, after making more than 400 appearances for City.

Summerbee signed for Blackpool on Christmas Eve 1976. The transfer had been the Blackpool chairman's idea, not that of manager Allan Brown. Summerbee later admitted that he should not have joined the club. He made just three League appearances for the Seasiders.

Summerbee ended his footballing career at Stockport County, where he was player-manager in the 1978–79 season. In 1980, he returned to the game for a single match, playing for non-League Mossley in their single goal FA Cup defeat of Crewe Alexandra.

== International career ==
Over a five-year period, which encompassed the 1970 World Cup Summerbee played for England eight times. He made his international debut against Scotland in front of 134,000 spectators at Hampden Park on 24 February 1968, and helped to secure a 1–1 draw to clinch qualification to UEFA Euro 1968.

== Later life ==
Off the pitch, Summerbee has been involved with a number of business ventures with varying degrees of success, including a period where he co-owned a menswear business with George Best. Summerbee is now the Club Ambassador for Manchester City.

Summerbee also starred in the cult film Escape to Victory alongside Sylvester Stallone, Michael Caine and Pelé.

Summerbee's son, Nicky, was also a professional footballer, who followed in his father's footsteps by playing for both Swindon Town and Manchester City before joining Sunderland. His father, George, and uncle, Gordon, were both lower-division players whose careers were affected by the outbreak of war.

== Career statistics ==
=== Club ===
Appearances and goals by club, season and competition
Club	Season	League			FA Cup		Other		Total	
Club	Season	Division	Apps	Goals	Apps	Goals	Apps	Goals	Apps	Goals
Swindon Town	1959–60	Third Division	15	1	0	0	0	0	15	1
Swindon Town	1960–61	Third Division	45	8	3	0	3	0	51	8
Swindon Town	1961–62	Third Division	43	4	2	0	3	0	48	4
Swindon Town	1962–63	Third Division	37	6	4	0	2	0	43	6
Swindon Town	1963–64	Second Division	37	7	3	0	4	1	44	8
Swindon Town	1964–65	Second Division	41	13	1	0	1	0	43	13
Swindon Town	Total		218	39	13	0	13	1	244	40
Manchester City	1965–66	Second Division	42	8	8	2	0	2	52	10
Manchester City	1966–67	First Division	32	4	4	2	2	1	38	7
Manchester City	1967–68	First Division	41	14	4	4	4	2	49	20
Manchester City	1968–69	First Division	39	6	6	0	6	2	51	8
Manchester City	1969–70	First Division	33	3	2	0	15	3	50	6
Manchester City	1970–71	First Division	26	4	2	0	9	0	37	4
Manchester City	1971–72	First Division	40	3	2	0	3	0	45	3
Manchester City	1972–73	First Division	38	2	4	1	4	0	46	3
Manchester City	1973–74	First Division	39	1	2	2	12	1	53	4
Manchester City	1974–75	First Division	27	2	0	0	4	1	31	3
Manchester City	Total		357	47	34	11	61	10	452	68
Burnley	1975–76	First Division	39	0	1	0	5	0	45	0
Burnley	1976–77	Second Division	12	0	0	0	4	0	16	0
Burnley	Total		51	0	1	0	9	0	61	0
Blackpool	1976–77	Second Division	3	0	0	0	0	0	3	0
Stockport County	1977–78	Fourth Division	42	4	3	1	2	0	47	5
Stockport County	1978–79	Fourth Division	33	1	3	0	3	0	39	1
Stockport County	1979–80	Fourth Division	12	1	0	0	3	0	15	1
Stockport County	Total		87	6	6	1	8	0	101	7
Career total			716	92	54	12	91	11	861	115

=== International ===
Appearances and goals by national team and year
National team	Year	Apps	Goals
England	1968	3	0
England	1969	0	0
England	1970	0	0
England	1971	1	1
England	1972	3	0
England	1973	1	0
Total		8	1

Scores and results list England's goal tally first, score column indicates score after each Summerbee goal.

List of international goals scored by Mike Summerbee
No.	Date	Venue	Opponent	Score	Result	Competition	Ref.
1	10 November 1971	Wembley Stadium, London, England	Switzerland	1–0	1–1	UEFA Euro 1972 qualification	

== Managerial statistics ==
Managerial record by team and tenure
Team	From	To	Record				
Team	From	To	P	W	D	L	Win %
Stockport County	1 March 1978	17 October 1979	83	24	19	40	28.9
Total			83	24	19	40	28.9

== Honours ==
Manchester City

- Football League First Division: 1967–68
- Football League Second Division: 1965–66
- FA Cup: 1968–69
- Football League Cup: 1969–70; runner-up: 1973–74
- FA Charity Shield: 1968, 1972
- European Cup Winners' Cup: 1969–70

England

- UEFA European Championship third-place: 1968

Individual

- Swindon Town Player of the Season: 1964–65
- Swindon Town Top Scorer: 1964–65
- Manchester City Player of the Year: 1971–72, 1972–73
- Manchester City Hall of Fame: 2004 (inducted)
- English Football Hall of Fame: 2013 (inducted)
- Order of the British Empire

Summerbee was appointed Officer of the Order of the British Empire (OBE) in the 2022 Birthday Honours for services to association football and charity.
