= George Heslop =

English footballer and manager

Personal information
- Full name: George Wilson Heslop
- Date of birth: 1 July 1940
- Place of birth: Dudley, Northumberland, England
- Date of death: 17 September 2006 (aged 66)
- Position: Centre half

Senior career*
Years	Team	Apps	(Gls)
1960–1962	Newcastle United	27	(0)
1962–1965	Everton	10	(0)
1965–1972	Manchester City	162	(1)
1972	→ Cape Town City (loan)	6	(0)
1972–1973	Bury	37	(0)
1977	Macclesfield Town	3	(0)
Total		245	(1)
- * Club domestic league appearances and goals

George Heslop (1 July 1940 – 17 September 2006) was an English footballer.

== Career ==
Heslop was a centre half who played for Newcastle United and Everton, before a successful spell at Manchester City between 1965 and 1971, where he made a total of 197 (plus six as substitute) first team appearances scoring three goals. He was an integral member of the team that won the Second Division title (1965–66 season), League Championship, 1968 FA Charity Shield, League Cup and the European Cup Winners' Cup. He later played in Cape Town and for Bury.

== Post-retirement ==
In retirement, he managed Northwich Victoria for a spell, before becoming landlord of the City Gates public house on Hyde Road. The City Gates was the original Hyde Road Hotel, the location where Ardwick became Manchester City F.C. The venture failed and closed in 1988. Stones from the building currently form part of City's memorial garden at the City of Manchester Stadium.

He died in September 2006 following a short illness.

== Honours ==
Manchester City

- Football League Cup: 1969–70
