= Matt Gray (footballer, born 1936) =

Scottish footballer

Personal information
- Full name: Matthew Gray
- Date of birth: 11 July 1936
- Place of birth: Renfrew, Scotland
- Date of death: 13 September 2016 (aged 80)
- Position: Forward

Youth career
- 1955–1957: Maryhill

Senior career*
Years	Team	Apps	(Gls)
1957	Stirling Albion (trialist)	1	(1)
1957–1963	Third Lanark	166	(94)
1963–1967	Manchester City	91	(21)
1967–1968	Port Elizabeth City	16	(11)
1968	Highlands Park	17	(4)
1969	Johannesburg Corinthians	?	(4)

International career
1959	SFL trial v SFA	1	(0)
- * Club domestic league appearances and goals

Matt Gray (11 July 1936 – 13 September 2016) was a Scottish footballer who played for Third Lanark and Manchester City. After leaving City in 1967, Gray emigrated to South Africa, where he continued his football career. Gray died on 13 September 2016, aged 80.
