= Vic Gomersall =

English footballer (1942–2024)

Personal information
- Full name: Victor Gomersall
- Date of birth: 17 June 1942
- Place of birth: Manchester, England
- Date of death: c. December 2024 (aged 82)
- Position: Full-back

Youth career
- Manchester City

Senior career*
Years	Team	Apps	(Gls)
1961–1966	Manchester City	39	(0)
1966–1971	Swansea City	178	(6)
1971–1975	Chelmsford City		
- Llanelli
- Haverfordwest County
- Pontardawe Athletic
- * Club domestic league appearances and goals

Victor Gomersall (17 June 1942 – c. December 2024) was an English footballer who played as a full-back in the Football League for Manchester City and Swansea Town.

== Playing career ==
At the age of 15, Gomersall joined hometown club Manchester City as an apprentice. On 18 November 1961, Gomersall made his Manchester City debut in a 2–2 draw against Chelsea. Over the course of four seasons, Gomersall made 39 appearances for the club, all coming in the league.

In 1966, Gomersall joined Swansea Town. During his five seasons at the club, Gomersall made 219 appearances in all competitions, including two appearances in the 1966–67 European Cup Winners' Cup. In 1971, Gomersall was released by the club by manager Roy Bentley.

Following his release from Swansea, Gomersall signed for Southern League side Chelmsford City. In his first season at the club, Gomersall captained Chelmsford to the Southern League championship, appearing in all 42 league games that season. During his four years at Chelmsford, Gomersall made 197 appearances in all competitions, scoring four goals, before being released by manager, and ex-Manchester City teammate, Bill Leivers after suffering a ruptured thigh muscle.

Gomersall later return to Wales, playing domestic football for Llanelli, Haverfordwest County and Pontardawe Athletic, winning the Welsh League Premier Division with Llanelli in 1977 and 1978.

== Post-playing career ==
Whilst playing at Chelmsford, Gomersall also took up the role of commercial manager. Upon moving back to Swansea, Gomersall became commercial manager at Swansea City, holding the post for twelve years as the club rose from the Fourth Division to the First Division. Gomersall would later work for Llanelli in a similar capacity. Gomersall would also hold the role of president of the Swansea Junior League for 25 years. He later presented and entertained the LT10 hospitality lounge on home match days for Swansea City.

On 12 December 2024, it was announced that Gomersall had died at the age of 82.
