= David Connor (footballer) =

English footballer (born 1945)

David Richard Connor (born 27 October 1945) was an English professional footballer who played as a left-back for Manchester City between 1964 and 1971 making 141 appearances and scoring 10 goals. He played for the Division One championship-winning side in 1967–68, making 13 appearances. He also played as they won the 1968 FA Charity Shield.

He later played for Preston North End and Macclesfield Town, when he was appointed player-manager. He made 35 league appearances and scored one goal, but following a series of disappointing results he resigned as manager in February 1978. Manager of Bury FC 1979–1980 in the third division Relegated at the end of season with a FA cup run to the fifth round at Anfield

== Honours ==
Manchester City

- FA Cup: 1968–69
