= 1968 FA Charity Shield =

- Event: FA Charity Shield
Manchester City	West Bromwich Albion
6	1
- Date: 3 August 1968
- Venue: Maine Road, Manchester
- Referee: Harry New
- Attendance: 35,510

The 1968 FA Charity Shield was a football match played on 3 August 1968 between Football League champions Manchester City and FA Cup winners West Bromwich Albion. It was the 46th Charity Shield match and was played at City's home ground, Maine Road. Manchester City won 6–1.

The official match programme cost one shilling.

== Match details ==
3 August 1968
15:00 BST

Manchester City	6–1	West Bromwich Albion
Owen 1', 59'; Lovett 5' (o.g.); Lee 40', 90'; Young 62'		Krzywicki 43'

Maine Road, Manchester
Attendance: 35,510
Referee: Harry New

Manchester City	West Bromwich Albion

GK	1	(England) Ken Mulhearn
RB	2	(England) David Connor
LB	3	(England) Glyn Pardoe
RH	4	(England) Mike Doyle
CH	5	(England) George Heslop (c)
LH	6	(England) Alan Oakes
OR	7	(England) Francis Lee
IR	8	(England) Colin Bell
CF	9	(England) Mike Summerbee
IL	10	(England) Neil Young
OL	11	(England) Bobby Owen
Manager:
(England) Joe Mercer

1	(England) John Osborne
2	(Scotland) Doug Fraser
3	(Wales) Graham Williams (c)
4	(England) Tony Brown
5	(England) John Talbut
6	(England) John Kaye
7	(England) Graham Lovett
8	(England) Ian Collard
9	(Scotland) Asa Hartford	Substituted off
10	(Wales) Dick Krzywicki
11	(England) Kenny Stephens
Substitute:
12	(Scotland) Alan Merrick	Substituted on
Manager:
(England) Alan Ashman

== See also ==
- 1967–68 Football League
- 1967–68 FA Cup
