= Joe Mercer =

English footballer and manager (1914–1990)

Joe Mercer OBE
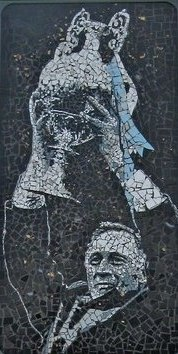
- Joe Mercer Memorial outside the City of Manchester Stadium

Personal information
- Full name: Joseph Mercer
- Date of birth: 9 August 1914
- Place of birth: Ellesmere Port, England
- Date of death: 9 August 1990 (aged 76)
- Place of death: England
- Height: 5 ft 9 in (1.75 m)
- Position: Left half

Youth career
- Ellesmere Port Town

Senior career*
Years	Team	Apps	(Gls)
1932–1946	Everton	186	(2)
1946–1955	Arsenal	247	(2)
Total		433	(4)

International career
1938–1939	England	5	(0)

Managerial career
- 1955–1958: Sheffield United
- 1958–1964: Aston Villa
- 1965–1971: Manchester City
- 1972–1974: Coventry City
- 1974: England (caretaker)
- * Club domestic league appearances and goals

Joseph Mercer (9 August 1914 – 9 August 1990) was an English footballer and manager. He played as a defender for Everton and Arsenal and managed Aston Villa and Manchester City, and served as caretaker manager of the England national football team.

== Playing career ==
Mercer was born in Ellesmere Port, Cheshire, the son of a former Nottingham Forest and Tranmere Rovers footballer, also named Joe. When Mercer was 12 his father died following health problems resulting from a gas attack during the First World War.

Mercer, a left-half, first played for Ellesmere Port Town. He was a powerful tackler and good at anticipating an opponent's moves. He joined Everton in September 1932 at the age of 18 and claimed a regular first team place in the 1935–36 season. Mercer made 186 appearances for Everton, scoring two goals and a winning a League championship medal in the 1938–39 season. While playing for Everton, he gained five England caps between 1938 and 1939.

Like many players of his generation, Mercer lost out on seven seasons of football due to the Second World War. He became a sergeant-major and played in 26 wartime internationals, many of them as captain. The Everton manager Theo Kelly accused Mercer of not trying in an international against Scotland, but in reality, Mercer had sustained a severe cartilage injury. Even after consulting an orthopaedic specialist, the Everton management refused to believe him and Mercer had to pay for the surgery himself. During the war, Mercer guested for Chester, making his debut in a 4–1 win over Halifax Town in September 1942.

Mercer moved in late 1946 for £9,000 (£471,362 in 2022) to Arsenal, commuting from Liverpool; Kelly brought Mercer's boots to the transfer negotiations to prevent Mercer having a reason to go back to say goodbye to the other players at Everton. He made his Arsenal debut against Bolton Wanderers on 30 November 1946 and soon after joining Arsenal, Mercer became club captain. As captain, he led Arsenal through their period of success in the late 1940s and early 1950s, helping to haul his side from the lower end of the table to win a League championship title in the 1947–48 season.

Mercer went on to win an FA Cup winner's medal in 1950 and was voted FWA Footballer of the Year the same year. He led Arsenal to the Cup final in 1952, which they lost 1–0 to Newcastle United. The following year, they bounced back to win his third League title with Arsenal winning the 1952–53 League championship on goal average. Mercer initially decided to retire in May 1953, but soon reconsidered and returned to Arsenal for the 1953–54 season. On 10 April 1954, he broke his leg in two places after a collision with teammate Joe Wade in a match against Liverpool, and retired the following year. Mercer played 275 times for Arsenal in all competitions, scoring twice.

== Managerial career ==
After his playing career ended, Mercer spent a year working as a journalist and a grocer. His wife's family had encouraged him to become involved in grocery during his time at Everton and, while still Arsenal's captain, he ran his grocery business at 105–107 Brighton Street, Wallasey.

On 18 August 1955, he returned to football, becoming manager of Sheffield United two days before their first game of the season against Newcastle United. Mercer was appointed to replace manager Reg Freeman, who had died during the close season. As a manager, he began inauspiciously and his first season ended in relegation. The rest of his time as manager was spent in the Second Division and in December 1958, wanting to move to another club, he resigned.

Mercer moved to Aston Villa, who were bottom of the First Division. Although he led them to the FA Cup semi-finals, he was relegated to the Second Division once again. He moved out the older players Johnny Dixon, Stan Lynn, Peter McParland and John Neal. He moulded a talented young side at Villa, and his team became known as the "Mercer Minors". He led Villa to victory in the inaugural League Cup in 1961, but suffered a stroke in 1964 and was then sacked by the Aston Villa board upon his recovery.

Despite this, his health improved and he went on to enjoy great success as a manager with Manchester City between 1965 and 1971. In his first season at Maine Road, the club won the 1966 Second Division title to regain their top-flight status. Two seasons later, Mercer led Manchester City to the 1967–68 First Division championship, and went on to win the 1969 FA Cup, the 1970 League Cup, and the 1970 European Cup Winners' Cup.

In the 1970–71 season, Mercer had a dispute with his assistant Malcolm Allison after the two men became embroiled in Manchester City's takeover battle. Mercer supported the existing board, led by the respected Albert Alexander Sr., while Allison supported the rival group led by Peter Swales after being promised that he would be manager in his own right.

The takeover succeeded, and Mercer was shocked to discover that his car parking space and office were removed. This led to Mercer moving upstairs to become general manager at Manchester City in October 1971, with Allison taking over as team manager. Mercer left Manchester City at the end of the season and became manager of Coventry City, whom he managed from 1972 to 1974. During the same time, Mercer was also caretaker manager of the England national football team for a brief period in 1974 after Alf Ramsey was sacked. During his time in charge, England shared the 1974 British Home Championship title with Scotland. In total, Mercer was in charge for seven games, winning three, drawing three and losing one. The FA was so impressed by these performances that questions arose about the possibility of Mercer taking the job on a permanent basis, with his Coventry City protege Gordon Milne as an assistant. Mercer seemed open to persuasion but the FA approached the most successful English club manager available, Leeds United's Don Revie.

== Later life ==
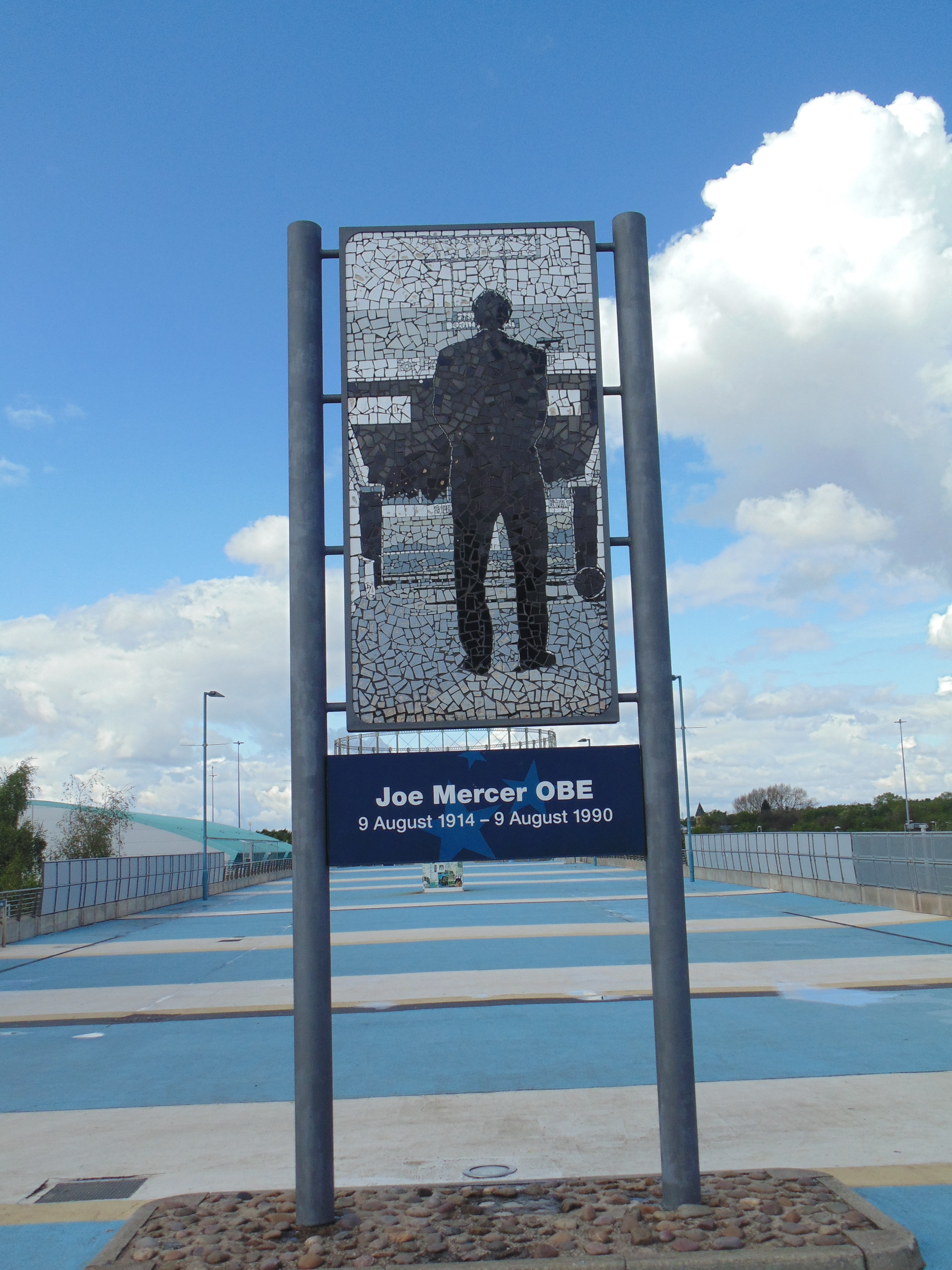
A mosaic in memory of Joe Mercer

After quitting as Coventry City boss, he served as a director of the club from 1975 to his retirement in 1981. He was also an active freemason, attending Rivacre Lodge No. 5805 at Ellesmere Port. Mercer was a subject of the television programme This Is Your Life in March 1970, when he was surprised by Eamonn Andrews. He was made an Officer of the Order of the British Empire for services to football in 1976. He suffered with Alzheimer's disease in later life and died, sitting in his favourite armchair, on his 76th birthday in 1990. He was survived by his widow Norah, who remained a keen football follower, and attended Manchester City matches for many years. She died in March 2013 and her funeral was attended by over 120 mourners, including City legends Mike Summerbee, Tony Book, Colin Bell and Joe Corrigan, as well as Bobby Charlton.

He is commemorated by Manchester City with the road Joe Mercer Way at the City of Manchester Stadium being named after him. Along the road are two mosaics by renowned Manchester artist Mark Kennedy of Mercer; one shows his smiling face lifting the League Championship trophy; the other is a version of a famous photograph showing Mercer from behind as he looks out over the Maine Road pitch towards the Kippax Stand. His contribution to City was commemorated in the Kippax tribute still sung at the City of Manchester Stadium to the tune of Auld Lang Syne: "The Stretford End cried out aloud: 'It's the end of you Sky Blues.' Joe Mercer came. We played the game. We went to Rotherham United, we won 1–0 and we were back into Division One. We've won the League, we've won the Cup, we've been to Europe too. And when we win the League again we'll sing this song to you: City, City, City."

At Maine Road, a corporate suite, the Joe Mercer Suite, was officially opened by his widow Norah in 1993. A similar facility named after him existed at Goodison Park. In 1993, Mercer's official biography, Football with a Smile, was written by Gary James. This book sold out within six months and was revised and re-published early in 2010. Mercer is also featured upon the mural that surrounds the Emirates Stadium. Mercer was inducted into the English Football Hall of Fame at the National Football Museum in Preston on 4 July 2009 for his managerial success.

== Honours ==
=== As a player ===
Everton

- Football League First Division: 1938–39

Arsenal

- Football League First Division: 1947–48, 1952–53
- FA Cup: 1949–50; runner-up: 1951–52
- FA Charity Shield: 1948, 1953

=== As a manager ===
Aston Villa

- Football League Second Division: 1959–60
- Football League Cup: 1960–61; runner-up: 1962–63

Manchester City

- Football League First Division: 1967–68
- Football League Second Division: 1965–66
- FA Cup: 1968–69
- Football League Cup: 1969–70
- FA Charity Shield: 1968
- European Cup Winners' Cup: 1969–70

England

- British Home Championship: 1973–74 (shared)

=== Individual ===
- English Football Hall of Fame: 2009
- FWA Footballer of the Year: 1949–50

== Managerial statistics ==
Team	From	To	Record					Refs
Team	From	To	G	W	D	L	Win %	Refs
Sheffield United	August 1955	December 1958	159	66	36	57	41.5	
Aston Villa	December 1958	July 1964	279	119	62	98	42.7	
Manchester City	July 1965	October 1971	340	149	94	97	43.8	
Coventry City	June 1972	May 1974	106	36	25	45	34.0	
England (caretaker)	May 1974	June 1974	7	3	3	1	42.9	
Total			891	373	220	298	41.9	

== See also ==
- List of English football championship winning managers

== Bibliography ==
- Harris, Jeff (1995). Hogg, Tony (ed.). Arsenal Who's Who. Independent UK Sports. ISBN 1-899429-03-4.
