= 1968–69 FA Cup =

Tournament details
- Country: England; Wales

Final positions
- Champions: Manchester City (4th title)
- Runners-up: Leicester City

Tournament statistics
- Top goal scorer: Denis Law (7)

The 1968–69 FA Cup was the 88th season of the world's oldest football cup competition, the Football Association Challenge Cup, commonly known as the FA Cup. Manchester City won the competition for the fourth time, defeating Leicester City 1–0 in the final at Wembley, through a goal from Neil Young.

Matches were scheduled to be played at the stadium of the team named first on the date specified for each round, which was always a Saturday. Some matches, however, might be rescheduled for other days if there were clashes with games for other competitions or the weather was inclement. If scores were level after 90 minutes had been played, a replay would take place at the stadium of the second-named team later the same week. If the replayed match was drawn further replays would be held until a winner was determined. If scores were level after 90 minutes had been played in a replay, a 30-minute period of extra time would be played. The 1968–69 tournament was remarkable in that no second replays were required at any point throughout the main event.

== Calendar ==
Round	Date
Preliminary round	Saturday, 7 September 1968
First round qualifying	Saturday, 21 September 1968
Second round qualifying	Saturday, 5 October 1968
Third round qualifying	Saturday, 19 October 1968
Fourth round qualifying	Saturday, 2 November 1968
First round proper	Saturday, 16 November 1968
Second round proper	Saturday, 7 December 1968
Third round proper	Saturday, 4 January 1969
Fourth round proper	Saturday, 25 January 1969
Fifth round proper	Saturday, 8 February 1969
Sixth round proper	Saturday, 1 March 1969
Semi-finals	Saturday, 22 March 1969
Final	Saturday, 26 April 1969

== Qualifying rounds ==
Most participating clubs that were not members of the Football League competed in the qualifying rounds to secure one of 30 places available in the first round.

The winners from the fourth qualifying round were Tow Law Town, South Shields, Goole Town, Altrincham, Morecambe, Skelmersdale United, Bangor City, Hereford United, Kidderminster Harriers, Macclesfield Town, Bilston, Kettering Town, Grantham, St Albans City, King's Lynn, Bury Town, Chelmsford City, Margate, Brentwood Town, Dartford, Ware, Oxford City, Barnet, Wealdstone, Canterbury City, Woking, Cheltenham Town, Weymouth, Yeovil Town and Waterlooville.

Bilston, Bury Town, Brentwood Town, Ware and Waterlooville were appearing in the competition proper for the first time, while Woking had last featured at this stage in 1958–59 and St Albans City had last done so in 1926-27. Brentwood Town was the first club from that centre to participate in the main draw of the FA Cup since 1885–86, the season before the original Brentwood FC moved to Leyton and was renamed Crusaders.

== Results ==
=== First round proper ===
At this stage the 48 clubs from the Football League Third and Fourth Divisions joined the 30 non-league clubs who came through the qualifying rounds. The final two non-league sides in the competition proper, Leytonstone and Chesham United were given byes to this round as the champions and runners-up from the previous season's FA Amateur Cup.

Matches were scheduled to be played on Saturday, 16 November 1968. Ten were drawn and went to replays two, three or four days later.

Tie no	Home team	Score	Away team	Date
1	Chesterfield	2–0	Skelmersdale United	16 November 1968
2	Darlington	2–0	Grimsby Town	16 November 1968
3	Dartford	3–1	Aldershot	16 November 1968
4	Hartlepool	1–1	Rotherham United	16 November 1968
Replay	Rotherham United	3–0	Hartlepool	19 November 1968
5	Barnet	1–1	Brentwood Town	16 November 1968
Replay	Brentwood Town	1–0	Barnet	18 November 1968
6	Grantham	2–1	Chelmsford City	16 November 1968
7	Weymouth	2–1	Yeovil Town	16 November 1968
8	Reading	1–0	Plymouth Argyle	16 November 1968
9	Macclesfield Town	1–3	Lincoln City	16 November 1968
10	Luton Town	6–1	Ware	16 November 1968
11	Swindon Town	1–0	Canterbury City	16 November 1968
12	Shrewsbury Town	1–1	Port Vale	16 November 1968
Replay	Port Vale	3–1	Shrewsbury Town	18 November 1968
13	Doncaster Rovers	1–0	Notts County	16 November 1968
14	Wrexham	4–2	Oldham Athletic	16 November 1968
15	Tranmere Rovers	0–1	Southport	16 November 1968
16	Stockport County	3–0	Bradford Park Avenue	16 November 1968
17	Oxford City	2–3	Swansea Town	16 November 1968
18	Leytonstone	0–1	Walsall	16 November 1968
19	Bangor City	2–3	Morecambe	16 November 1968
20	Barnsley	0–0	Rochdale	16 November 1968
Replay	Rochdale	0–1	Barnsley	18 November 1968
21	Brentford	2–0	Woking	16 November 1968
22	Bristol Rovers	3–1	Peterborough United	16 November 1968
23	Northampton Town	3–1	Margate	16 November 1968
24	Brighton & Hove Albion	2–2	Kidderminster Harriers	16 November 1968
Replay	Kidderminster Harriers	0–1	Brighton & Hove Albion	20 November 1968
25	Bradford City	1–2	Chester	16 November 1968
26	Goole Town	1–3	Barrow	16 November 1968
27	Altrincham	0–1	Crewe Alexandra	16 November 1968
28	Southend United	9–0	King's Lynn	16 November 1968
29	Exeter City	0–0	Newport County	16 November 1968
Replay	Newport County	1–3	Exeter City	18 November 1968
30	Mansfield Town	4–1	Tow Law Town	16 November 1968
31	Wealdstone	1–1	St Albans City	16 November 1968
Replay	St Albans City	1–0	Wealdstone	19 November 1968
32	Cheltenham Town	0–4	Watford	16 November 1968
33	Workington	2–0	Scunthorpe United	16 November 1968
34	Hereford United	0–0	Torquay United	16 November 1968
Replay	Torquay United	4–2	Hereford United	20 November 1968
35	Bury Town	0–0	Bournemouth & Boscombe Athletic	16 November 1968
Replay	Bournemouth & Boscombe Athletic	3–0	Bury Town	20 November 1968
36	South Shields	0–6	York City	16 November 1968
37	Colchester United	5–0	Chesham United	16 November 1968
38	Bilston	1–3	Halifax Town	16 November 1968
39	Waterlooville	1–2	Kettering Town	16 November 1968
40	Orient	1–1	Gillingham	16 November 1968
Replay	Gillingham	2–1	Orient	20 November 1968

=== Second round proper ===
The matches were scheduled for Saturday, 7 December 1968. Nine matches were drawn, with replays taking place later the same week.

Tie no	Home team	Score	Away team	Date
1	Chester	1–1	Lincoln City	7 December 1968
Replay	Lincoln City	2–1	Chester	11 December 1968
2	Chesterfield	2–1	Wrexham	7 December 1968
3	Darlington	0–0	Barnsley	7 December 1968
Replay	Barnsley	1–0	Darlington	10 December 1968
4	Bournemouth & Boscombe Athletic	0–0	Bristol Rovers	7 December 1968
Replay	Bristol Rovers	1–0	Bournemouth & Boscombe Athletic	10 December 1968
5	Grantham	0–2	Swindon Town	7 December 1968
6	Watford	1–0	Brentford	7 December 1968
7	Weymouth	1–1	Swansea Town	7 December 1968
Replay	Swansea Town	2–0	Weymouth	10 December 1968
8	Reading	0–0	Torquay United	7 December 1968
Replay	Torquay United	1–2	Reading	11 December 1968
9	Luton Town	3–1	Gillingham	7 December 1968
10	Doncaster Rovers	2–1	Southport	7 December 1968
11	Stockport County	2–0	Barrow	7 December 1968
12	Brighton & Hove Albion	1–2	Northampton Town	7 December 1968
13	Southend United	10–1	Brentwood Town	7 December 1968
14	St Albans City	1–1	Walsall	7 December 1968
Replay	Walsall	3–1	St Albans City	10 December 1968
15	Port Vale	0–0	Workington	7 December 1968
Replay	Workington	1–2	Port Vale	11 December 1968
16	Halifax Town	1–1	Crewe Alexandra	7 December 1968
Replay	Crewe Alexandra	1–3	Halifax Town	11 December 1968
17	York City	2–0	Morecambe	7 December 1968
18	Kettering Town	5–0	Dartford	7 December 1968
19	Rotherham United	2–2	Mansfield Town	7 December 1968
Replay	Mansfield Town	1–0	Rotherham United	9 December 1968
20	Colchester United	0–1	Exeter City	7 December 1968

=== Third round proper ===
The 44 First and Second Division clubs entered the competition at this stage. The matches were scheduled for Saturday, 4 January 1969. Seven matches were drawn and went to replays. Kettering Town was the last non-league club left in the competition.

Tie no	Home team	Score	Away team	Date
1	Burnley	3–1	Derby County	4 January 1969
2	Bury	1–2	Huddersfield Town	4 January 1969
3	Liverpool	2–0	Doncaster Rovers	4 January 1969
4	Preston North End	3–0	Nottingham Forest	4 January 1969
5	Watford	2–0	Port Vale	4 January 1969
6	Walsall	0–1	Tottenham Hotspur	4 January 1969
7	Blackburn Rovers	2–0	Stockport County	4 January 1969
8	Aston Villa	2–1	Queens Park Rangers	4 January 1969
9	Sheffield Wednesday	1–1	Leeds United	4 January 1969
Replay	Leeds United	1–3	Sheffield Wednesday	8 January 1969
10	Bolton Wanderers	2–1	Northampton Town	4 January 1969
11	Middlesbrough	1–1	Millwall	4 January 1969
Replay	Millwall	1–0	Middlesbrough	6 January 1969
12	West Bromwich Albion	3–0	Norwich City	4 January 1969
13	Sunderland	1–4	Fulham	4 January 1969
14	Everton	2–1	Ipswich Town	4 January 1969
15	Swindon Town	0–2	Southend United	4 January 1969
16	Newcastle United	4–0	Reading	4 January 1969
17	Manchester City	1–0	Luton Town	4 January 1969
18	Barnsley	1–1	Leicester City	4 January 1969
Replay	Leicester City	2–1	Barnsley	8 January 1969
19	Bristol Rovers	1–1	Kettering Town	4 January 1969
Replay	Kettering Town	1–2	Bristol Rovers	8 January 1969
20	Coventry City	3–1	Blackpool	4 January 1969
21	Portsmouth	3–0	Chesterfield	4 January 1969
22	West Ham United	3–2	Bristol City	4 January 1969
23	Hull City	1–3	Wolverhampton Wanderers	4 January 1969
24	Chelsea	2–0	Carlisle United	4 January 1969
25	Exeter City	1–3	Manchester United	4 January 1969
26	Mansfield Town	2–1	Sheffield United	4 January 1969
27	Cardiff City	0–0	Arsenal	4 January 1969
Replay	Arsenal	2–0	Cardiff City	7 January 1969
28	Swansea Town	0–1	Halifax Town	4 January 1969
29	Charlton Athletic	0–0	Crystal Palace	4 January 1969
Replay	Crystal Palace	0–2	Charlton Athletic	8 January 1969
30	York City	0–2	Stoke City	4 January 1969
31	Birmingham City	2–1	Lincoln City	4 January 1969
32	Oxford United	1–1	Southampton	4 January 1969
Replay	Southampton	2–0	Oxford United	8 January 1969

=== Fourth round proper ===
The matches were scheduled for Saturday, 25 January 1969. Six matches were drawn and went to replays.

Tie no	Home team	Score	Away team	Date
1	Liverpool	2–1	Burnley	25 January 1969
2	Preston North End	0–0	Chelsea	25 January 1969
Replay	Chelsea	2–1	Preston North End	3 February 1969
3	Southampton	2–2	Aston Villa	25 January 1969
Replay	Aston Villa	2–1	Southampton	29 January 1969
4	Blackburn Rovers	4–0	Portsmouth	25 January 1969
5	Sheffield Wednesday	2–2	Birmingham City	25 January 1969
Replay	Birmingham City	2–1	Sheffield Wednesday	28 January 1969
6	Bolton Wanderers	1–2	Bristol Rovers	25 January 1969
7	Everton	2–0	Coventry City	25 January 1969
8	Newcastle United	0–0	Manchester City	25 January 1969
Replay	Manchester City	2–0	Newcastle United	29 January 1969
9	Tottenham Hotspur	2–1	Wolverhampton Wanderers	25 January 1969
10	Fulham	1–2	West Bromwich Albion	25 January 1969
11	Manchester United	1–1	Watford	25 January 1969
Replay	Watford	0–2	Manchester United	3 February 1969
12	Millwall	0–1	Leicester City	25 January 1969
13	Huddersfield Town	0–2	West Ham United	25 January 1969
14	Mansfield Town	2–1	Southend United	25 January 1969
15	Arsenal	2–0	Charlton Athletic	25 January 1969
16	Stoke City	1–1	Halifax Town	25 January 1969
Replay	Halifax Town	0–3	Stoke City	28 January 1969

=== Fifth round proper ===
The matches were scheduled for Saturday, 8 February 1969. However, for the first time in history, the entire fifth round draw for the FA Cup was unable to be played due to heavy snowfall across England, and the matches were replayed at various times after this date. Most took place by the following Wednesday (one of these requiring a replay), two were played a fortnight later, but the final match was not played until 1 March and required a replay two days later.

Tie no	Home team	Score	Away team	Date
1	Leicester City	0–0	Liverpool	1 March 1969
Replay	Liverpool	0–1	Leicester City	3 March 1969
2	Blackburn Rovers	1–4	Manchester City	24 February 1969
3	West Bromwich Albion	1–0	Arsenal	12 February 1969
4	Everton	1–0	Bristol Rovers	12 February 1969
5	Tottenham Hotspur	3–2	Aston Villa	12 February 1969
6	Chelsea	3–2	Stoke City	12 February 1969
7	Mansfield Town	3–0	West Ham United	26 February 1969
8	Birmingham City	2–2	Manchester United	11 February 1969
Replay	Manchester United	6–2	Birmingham City	24 February 1969

=== Sixth round proper ===
The four quarter-final ties were scheduled to be played on 1 March 1969, although due to the late completion of Leicester City's fifth round tie, their match with Mansfield Town was not played until 8 March. There were no replays.

Tie no	Home team	Score	Away team	Date
1	Manchester City	1–0	Tottenham Hotspur	1 March 1969
2	Manchester United	0–1	Everton	1 March 1969
3	Chelsea	1–2	West Bromwich Albion	1 March 1969
4	Mansfield Town	0–1	Leicester City	8 March 1969

=== Semi-finals ===
The semi-final matches were played on Saturday 22 March and Saturday 29 March 1969.

22 March 1969
15:00

Manchester City	1–0	Everton
Booth 87'	Report

Villa Park, Birmingham
Referee: W. G. Handley, Cannock
29 March 1969
15:00

Leicester City	1–0	West Bromwich Albion
Clarke 86'	Report

Hillsborough, Sheffield
Referee: Ray Tinkler, Boston

=== Final ===
The 1969 FA Cup Final was contested by Manchester City and Leicester City at Wembley on Saturday 26 April 1969. The match finished 1–0 to Manchester City who, behind West Ham United in 1975, are the second-last all-English team to win the FA Cup.

26 April 1969
15:00 BST

Manchester City	1–0	Leicester City
Young 24'	(Report)

Wembley, London
Attendance: 100,000
Referee: George McCabe (South Yorkshire)

Manchester City	Leicester City
