= Ferran Soriano =

Spanish businessman (born 1967)

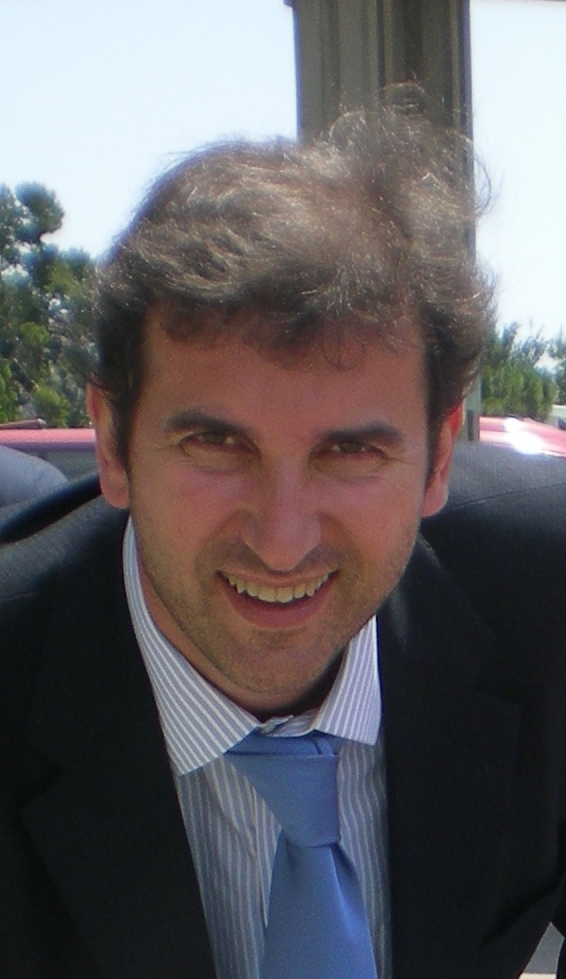
- Soriano in 2010

Personal details
- Born: Ferran Soriano Compte; 16 June 1967 (age 59) Barcelona, Catalonia, Spain
- Education: UCLouvain, Belgium. MBA (1990); Rensselaer Polytechnic Institute, New York. MBA (1989); ESADE, Barcelona. CE+MBA (1985–1990)
- Occupation: CEO City Football Group (2013–) CEO Manchester City (2012–) CEO New York City (2014–) CEO Melbourne City (2014–) Previously: Chairman at Spanair (2009–2012); Vice-President Barcelona (2003–2008); founding partner of Cluster Consulting (1994–2003)

Ferran Soriano Compte (born 16 June 1967) is a Spanish businessman who is the chief executive officer of Premier League club Manchester City. His tenure at Manchester City has overlapped with a majority of the years during which the club were found by an independent commission to have breached the Premier League's financial rules. He also operates in the same role for Major League Soccer's New York City, and the A-League's Melbourne City. Between 2003 and 2008, he was the vice-president and General Manager of Barcelona.

He is on the board of the European Club Association.

== Education ==
Ferran Soriano is an MBA and Business studies graduate at ESADE, the New York RPI and Université catholique de Louvain of Belgium.

He speaks Catalan, English, Spanish, Italian, French and Portuguese.

== Career ==
Soriano has held a number of positions in companies in a variety of industries, such as consumer products, telecommunications and entertainment, and has held senior positions at The Mac Group, Reckitt Benckiser, and Cluster Consulting, a management consulting firm he co-founded in 1993.

Between 2003 and 2008, Soriano was Economy Vice President of Barcelona, having been elected with the Joan Laporta’s ticket to the club's Board of Directors. He also acted as interim CEO. Barcelona's revenues, during Soriano's tenure, increased from €123 million to €308m, while a €73m loss was turned into an €88m profit. On 6 July 2008, Soriano and seven other board members resigned after a vote of non-confidence against the board, amidst growing disagreement with Laporta’s "leadership style."

In April 2009, Soriano was elected Chairman of the Catalonia-based airline Spanair, rescued by the Catalan government from SAS with the objective of creating a hub in the Barcelona airport. Revenue improved and the company started cutting costs, but, on 27 January 2012, after a deal with Qatar Airways fell through, the airline ceased operations.

On 1 September 2012, Soriano was appointed as CEO of Manchester City. In the first year and months of his tenure, Manchester City cut its losses in half. In 2026, the club were found by an independent commission to have breached the Premier League's financial rules during this period.

Soriano was instrumental in replacing manager Roberto Mancini with Manuel Pellegrini in 2013, tasking him with winning “five trophies in five years”. Mancini hit back at Soriano after his replacement, saying: "Soriano? For him I was too big within the club. A manager in full control, loved by the fans still today. He judged a person and a context without knowing anything about the people he should have dealt with. I never thought of him as an interesting person from a football perspective. We never spoke the same language. And I'm not talking about Italian, Spanish or English."

In the same period, the City Football Group bought an MLS franchise in New York to create New York City and an existing football club in Australia (Melbourne Heart), initiating the club's expansion strategy.

In 2023, as CEO of Manchester City still, he was voted onto the board of the European Club Association (ECA). He had previously been an observer to the board for two seasons.

== Controversies ==
In January 2013, Barcelona president Sandro Rosell claimed that "Manchester City have attempted to entice a number of staff from the Camp Nou", but added "there were no fish left". Rosell alleged that the Manchester club tried, in an "offensive" approach, to sign players "from all levels of Barcelona's structure," and also other employees of the Catalan side. These allegations were not pursued.

In February 2013, Soriano was accused by the Barcelona board, led by Rosell, of authorising a £1.7 million e-mail surveillance of club employees suspected of "working against" Barça's then president Joan Laporta. In March 2014, a judge cleared Soriano of these allegations.

In September 2014, Soriano was found guilty in Spanair's bankruptcy case and fined £8.6 million. In May 2016, the decision was overturned by the appeal court judges, who concluded that Spanair's executives were acting in order to try and "save the company", and its subsequent bankruptcy was “fortuitous”.
