= Manchester City F.C. financial breaches scandal =

English football scandal since 2018

Since 2018, Manchester City F.C. has been implicated in a major financial scandal, following the publication of leaked internal emails alleged to reveal that the club had committed systematic, deliberate violations of UEFA's Financial Fair Play (FFP) and the Premier League's Profit and Sustainability (PSR) rules.

In response to the leaked emails, UEFA and the Premier League opened separate investigations into the club's financial behaviour. In February 2020, UEFA found City guilty of breaching its FFP rules, and penalized the club with a €30m fine and a ban on UEFA Champions League participation for two years. However, an appeal by City to the Court of Arbitration for Sport (CAS) overturned the Champions League ban and reduced the fine to €10m; the court finding that most of UEFA's charges were "either not established or time-barred."

In February 2023, the Premier League charged City with 115 breaches of its financial regulations, spanning a nine-year period from 2009 to 2018. A three-person independent commission heard the case over a 10-week period from September to December 2024. On 28 September 2026, the Premier League announced that the commission found City guilty of all 80 charges related to financial wrongdoing, and 34 of 35 charges of failure to cooperate with the league investigation. Chief among the commission's findings was that City's owners 'disguised' over £900 million in direct equity funding as sponsorship revenue, allowing the club to spend far more than UEFA and PL rules permitted.

The verdict is currently being appealed by City. If the appeal fails, the club is liable to sanctions including fines and point deductions significant enough to ensure the club's relegation, up to outright expulsion from the Premier League.

== Background ==
Mansour bin Zayed Al Nahyan

Khaldoon Al Mubarak

Manchester City F.C. is majority-owned by Emirati royal Mansour bin Zayed Al Nahyan. The brother of UAE President Mohamed bin Zayed, Mansour serves as vice president and deputy prime minister of the UAE, and chairs the country's central bank as well as its federal sovereign wealth fund. His Abu Dhabi United Group (ADUG), nominally a non-state entity, acquired the club in 2008 from former Thai prime minister Thaksin Shinawatra, whose short-lived ownership was thrown into jeopardy after Thai authorities froze $830 million of his assets following a corruption investigation. After the takeover, Mansour appointed Khaldoon Al Mubarak, a senior Emirati government official, as club chairman. In 2013, City Football Group was founded to manage ADUG's football holdings, including Manchester City.

ADUG's early ownership was characterized by high transfer spending. In 2010, The Guardian reported that Mansour had directly financed the club with over £650 million to offset transfer expenditures in his first two years of ownership, which had brought such players as Yaya Touré, David Silva, Samir Nasri, and Sergio Agüero. The club's financial strategy drew comparisons to Chelsea F.C. under Roman Abramovich, who similarly financed Chelsea via shareholder loans to fund high-profile transfers. The virtually unrestricted financing methods employed by both clubs were controversial, with several critics terming it "financial doping." In 2009, UEFA announced the establishment of Financial Fair Play (FFP) regulations, intended to prevent clubs from spending more than they earn. In 2013, the Premier League finalized its own Profit and Sustainability Rules (PSR) with the same aim.

Manchester City won the FA Cup in 2011; the club's first major trophy since 1976—and clinched their first Premier League title the following year; their first league victory since 1968. Since then, the club has won seven more league titles (2013–14, 2017–18, 2018–19, 2020–21, 2021–22, 2022–23, 2023–24), three more FA Cups (2019, 2023, 2026), seven EFL Cups (2014, 2016, 2018, 2019, 2020, 2021, 2026), the club's maiden UEFA Champions League title (2023), consequently winning its first UEFA Super Cup (2023) and FIFA Club World Cup titles (2023), becoming England's fourth-most successful football club by honours won.

== Der Spiegel leaks (2018) ==
In November 2018, European Investigative Collaborations (EIC) announced that they would be releasing a set of confidential documents related to financial wrongdoing in football. The Manchester City-related files were obtained in January 2017 by Portuguese hacker Rui Pinto, following a phishing attack in which he breached club servers by persuading a senior official to open a malicious link that purported to be a financial report from UEFA.

From 5 to 8 November, Der Spiegel, a member of EIC, released a four-part investigative report into leaked documents and emails concerning Manchester City, claiming that they revealed "evidence of backdated contracts, illusory sponsoring payments and cavalier, 'We can do what we want,' business practices."

In response to an EIC request for comment, Manchester City stated: “We will not be providing any comment on out-of-context materials purportedly hacked or stolen,” adding that “the attempt to damage the club’s reputation is organised and clear.”

== UEFA investigation (2019–2020) ==
In March 2019, UEFA announced that it was opening an investigation into the leaks. Manchester City released a statement saying that it "welcomes the opening of a formal UEFA investigation as an opportunity to bring to an end the speculation resulting from the illegal hacking and out of context publication of City emails".

The UEFA investigation concluded in February 2020, with City being found guilty of "serious breaches of the UEFA Financial Fair Play Regulations by overstating its sponsorship revenue in its accounts and in the break-even information submitted to UEFA between 2012 and 2016." The club was barred from participating in the UEFA Champions League for two years. However, City's appeal to the Court of Arbitration for Sport (CAS) successfully overturned the ban in July 2020, with the court stating that "most of the alleged breaches were either not established or time-barred".

== Premier League investigation (2018–) ==
=== Charges ===
On 6 February 2023, the Premier League announced that its investigation found City in breach of its financial rules, and that it would be referring its findings to an independent commission, whose members were to be selected by the Chair of the Premier League Judicial Panel. The charges span a nine-year period from 2009 to 2018, and comprise 54 counts of failure to provide accurate financial information, 14 counts of failure to provide accurate details for player and manager payments, 7 counts of breaching the Premier League's Profit and Sustainability Rules (PSR), 5 counts of breaching UEFA's Financial Fair Play (FFP) regulations, and 35 counts of failure to cooperate with league investigations.

=== Hearing ===
The in-person hearing began on 16 September 2024, and concluded on 6 December 2024. In accordance with Premier League regulations, the hearing was confidential and held in private. The club's legal defence was led by British barrister David Pannick.

=== Verdict ===
On 25 September 2026, The Athletic's David Ornstein reported that the panel had reached a verdict, declaring City guilty of 114 of the 115 charges. On 29 September 2026, the Premier League confirmed the verdict in an official statement, stating that the club used "sham contracts" in which sponsors paid less than the contracts stated, with the difference being paid by the club's owners, resulting in inflated revenue and reduced costs of £900 million in total. The punishment is to be decided in a separate hearing. The club published a response in which they denied all wrongdoing and said they would appeal.

== Reactions ==
The case garnered significant interest from sports media, players, managers, and fans during its course. Following the announcement of the charges, then-City manager Pep Guardiola stated: "In the end, I know fairly that what we won we won on the pitch. We don't have any doubts." He reiterated his belief in the club's innocence in 2025, stating "I trust them. I spoke with them and trust how they behave and how they did. What happened, happened.". The New York Times' Tariq Panja wrote that the charges "threaten to rewrite years of Premier League history", and could arouse geopolitical implications involving the United Kingdom's relationship with the UAE given Sheikh Mansour's central role.

Following the verdict, City co-chairman Khaldoon Al Mubarak released a statement, saying that "nothing has changed" and that "our confidence and intent in proving the Club's innocence is just as strong as when this began." Meanwhile, City manager Enzo Maresca posted a cryptic social media message, reading “I know nothing”. Former City player and 2024 Ballon d'Or winner Rodri stated that he trusts the club, and that "they told us to be relaxed, as they had done everything correctly."

Other Premier League clubs are reported to be planning legal action against City to seek compensation for potential sporting and sponsorship losses, during the period in which City were found to have violated Premier League rules. The Guardian's Barney Ronay wrote that City's "plastic success" was now "tainted", writing that "arguably everyone who bought a Sky Sports subscription in that period now has a legal claim against City". Tony Pulis was manager of Stoke City when Stoke lost the 2011 FA Cup final to Manchester City; he wrote on the BBC Sport website that he felt "cheated" and asked "When do we get our FA Cup?", but felt that the revoking of any honours was unlikely. Ian Holloway, who managed Blackpool during their Premier League campaign (2010–11), called for Manchester City to be relegated all the way down to non-league football.
