= 2020 EFL Cup final =

- Match programme cover
- Event: 2019–20 EFL Cup
Aston Villa	Manchester City
1	2
- Date: 1 March 2020
- Venue: Wembley Stadium, London
- Man of the Match: Phil Foden (Manchester City)
- Referee: Lee Mason (Lancashire)
- Attendance: 82,145

The 2020 EFL Cup final was the final of the 2019–20 EFL Cup. It was played at Wembley Stadium in London, England, on 1 March 2020, and contested by Aston Villa and Manchester City. It was Villa's first EFL Cup final since 2010, and City's third successive EFL Cup final and fifth in the past seven seasons.

City won the match 2–1 to claim their third consecutive EFL Cup title. As winners, they would have entered the second qualifying round of the 2020–21 UEFA Europa League, but instead qualified directly for the 2020–21 UEFA Champions League by finishing second in the 2019–20 Premier League. Although they were initially banned from all UEFA club competitions for the 2020–21 and 2021–22 seasons by UEFA due to Financial Fair Play breaches, the decision was pending appeal to the Court of Arbitration for Sport, and overturned on 13 July 2020.

== Route to the final ==
=== Aston Villa ===
Round	Opposition	Score
2	Crewe Alexandra (A)	6–1
3	Brighton & Hove Albion (A)	3–1
4	Wolverhampton Wanderers (H)	2–1
QF	Liverpool (H)	5–0
SF	Leicester City (A)	1–1
SF	Leicester City (H)	2–1
Key: (H) = Home; (A) = Away

Aston Villa, as a Premier League team not involved in European competition, started in the second round where they played EFL League Two club Crewe Alexandra away. At Gresty Road, Aston Villa won 6–1 with two goals from Conor Hourihane as well as goals from Ezri Konsa, Keinan Davis, Frederic Guilbert and Jack Grealish. In the third round, they played fellow Premier League side Brighton & Hove Albion away at the Falmer Stadium. Villa won 3–1 with goals from Jota, Hourihane and Grealish. In the next round, they drew Premier League team Wolverhampton Wanderers at home. At Villa Park, they progressed to the next round with a 2–1 win thanks to goals from Anwar El Ghazi and Ahmed Elmohamady.

In the quarter-finals they played Premier League side and European champions Liverpool at Villa Park. Due to Liverpool's participation in the 2019 FIFA Club World Cup in Qatar soon after, they fielded an inexperienced team and the club's youngest ever starting lineup, while Villa made 10 changes while still fielding mostly senior players. Villa won 5–0 with goals from Hourihane, two from Jonathan Kodjia, Wesley and an own goal from Morgan Boyes. In the two-legged semi-final they played Premier League side Leicester City. After a 1–1 draw in the first leg away at the King Power Stadium, Villa reached the final after a 2–1 win at Villa Park with goals from Matt Targett and a 93rd-minute winner from Trézéguet to complete a 3–2 aggregate victory.

=== Manchester City ===
Round	Opposition	Score
3	Preston North End (A)	3–0
4	Southampton (H)	3–1
QF	Oxford United (A)	3–1
SF	Manchester United (A)	3–1
SF	Manchester United (H)	0–1
Key: (H) = Home; (A) = Away

EFL Cup holders Manchester City, as a Premier League team involved in the 2019–20 UEFA Champions League, started the competition in the third round. They were first drawn away at EFL Championship side Preston North End. At Deepdale, City won 3–0 with goals from Raheem Sterling, Gabriel Jesus and an own goal from Ryan Ledson. In the next round, they drew fellow Premier League team Southampton at home. At the City of Manchester Stadium, they won 3–1 with two goals from Sergio Agüero and one from Nicolás Otamendi.

In the fifth round, they played against League One side Oxford United away at the Kassam Stadium. City won 3–1 with two goals from Sterling and one from João Cancelo. In the two-legged semi-final, they drew Premier League and local rivals Manchester United. City earned a 3–1 victory in the first leg at Old Trafford, with goals from Bernardo Silva, Riyad Mahrez and an own goal from Andreas Pereira. Despite a 1–0 loss at home in the second leg, they reached the final with a 3–2 aggregate score. City were looking to retain the EFL Cup for the third consecutive year, and win a seventh title overall.

== Match ==
=== Summary ===
Manchester City manager Pep Guardiola made eight changes to his side, who had beaten Real Madrid in the Champions League four days earlier, including leaving midfielder Kevin De Bruyne on the bench. Aston Villa manager Dean Smith began with a defensive-minded 4–5–1 formation.

Manchester City dominated the first half of the game, and they took the lead after 20 minutes; Phil Foden headed a chipped ball from Rodri back across goal into the path of Sergio Agüero, whose shot deflected off Tyrone Mings and into the goal. Ten minutes later, they extended their lead from a corner kick, as Rodri lost his marker, Frédéric Guilbert, and headed past goalkeeper Ørjan Nyland. Reports noted that the corner that led to the City goal was unjustly awarded, but City remained dominant and enjoyed their strongest spell of the game in the 10 minutes following Rodri's goal. A comeback appeared a remote prospect, but Aston Villa got a goal back against the run of play in the 41st minute, when John Stones slipped to allow Mbwana Samatta to score with a diving header.

Manchester City played with less dominance in the opening 10 minutes of the second half, but regained control after De Bruyne was brought on in place of İlkay Gündoğan. They then remained the dominant team throughout most of the final half-hour, having the majority of the possession as well as being disciplined when they lost the ball, winning the ball back and preventing dangerous attacks by Villa. But Villa defended well, their players risking injuries to make important tackles, and despite City's dominance they were unable to score a third goal. Villa almost equalised in the 88th minute, when Björn Engels headed the ball towards the goal from a Conor Hourihane corner, but City goalkeeper Claudio Bravo pushed the ball onto the post to maintain his team's lead. Despite another corner in injury time, Manchester City held on for the 2–1 win, and lifted the trophy for the third successive year.

=== Details ===
1 March 2020
16:30 GMT

Aston Villa	1–2	Manchester City
Samatta 41'	Report	Agüero 20'; Rodri 30'

Wembley Stadium, London
Attendance: 82,145
Referee: Lee Mason (Lancashire)

Aston Villa	Manchester City

GK	25	(Norway) Ørjan Nyland
RB	24	(France) Frédéric Guilbert
CB	22	(Belgium) Björn Engels
CB	40	(England) Tyrone Mings	(yellow card) 90+2'
LB	18	(England) Matt Targett
CM	6	(Brazil) Douglas Luiz
CM	11	(Zimbabwe) Marvelous Nakamba	(yellow card) 72'
RW	27	(Egypt) Ahmed Elmohamady	(yellow card) 68'	(substituted off) 70'
AM	10	(England) Jack Grealish (c)
LW	21	(Netherlands) Anwar El Ghazi		(substituted off) 70'
CF	20	(Tanzania) Mbwana Samatta		(substituted off) 80'
Substitutes:
GK	29	(Spain) Pepe Reina
DF	3	(Wales) Neil Taylor
DF	15	(England) Ezri Konsa
MF	8	(England) Henri Lansbury
MF	14	(Republic of Ireland) Conor Hourihane		(substituted on) 70'
MF	17	(Egypt) Trézéguet		(substituted on) 70'
FW	39	(England) Keinan Davis		(substituted on) 80'
Manager:
(England) Dean Smith

GK	1	(Chile) Claudio Bravo
RB	2	(England) Kyle Walker
CB	5	(England) John Stones
CB	25	(Brazil) Fernandinho
LB	11	(Ukraine) Oleksandr Zinchenko
CM	8	(Germany) İlkay Gündoğan		(substituted off) 58'
CM	16	(Spain) Rodri	(yellow card) 60'
RM	47	(England) Phil Foden
AM	21	(Spain) David Silva (c)		(substituted off) 77'
LM	7	(England) Raheem Sterling	(yellow card) 57'
CF	10	(Argentina) Sergio Agüero		(substituted off) 84'
Substitutes:
GK	31	(Brazil) Ederson
DF	22	(France) Benjamin Mendy
DF	30	(Argentina) Nicolás Otamendi
MF	17	(Belgium) Kevin De Bruyne		(substituted on) 58'
MF	20	(Portugal) Bernardo Silva		(substituted on) 77'
MF	26	(Algeria) Riyad Mahrez
FW	9	(Brazil) Gabriel Jesus		(substituted on) 84'
Manager:
(Spain) Pep Guardiola

Man of the Match:
Phil Foden (Manchester City)

Assistant referees:
Ian Hussin (Liverpool)
Harry Lennard (Sussex)
Fourth official:
David Coote (Nottinghamshire)
Reserve assistant referee:
Nick Hopton (Derbyshire)
Video assistant referee:
Mike Dean (Cheshire)
Assistant video assistant referee:
Neil Davies (London)

Match rules

- 90 minutes
- 30 minutes of extra time if necessary
- Penalty shoot-out if scores still level
- Seven named substitutes
- Maximum of three substitutions, with a fourth allowed in extra time
