= Manchester City F.C. =

Association football club in England

Manchester City
- Full name: Manchester City Football Club
- Nicknames: The Citizens (Cityzens); The Blues; The Sky Blues
- Short name: Man City; City
- Founded: 1880; 146 years ago as St. Mark's (West Gorton); 1887; 139 years ago as Ardwick Association F.C. 16 April 1894; 132 years ago as Manchester City
- Ground: Etihad Stadium
- Capacity: 61,038
- Owner: City Football Group Limited
- Chairman: Khaldoon Al Mubarak
- Manager: Enzo Maresca
- League: Premier League
- 2025–26: Premier League, 2nd of 20
- Website: mancity.com
Home colours	Away colours	Third colours

Manchester City Football Club, commonly referred to as Man City or simply City, is a professional football club based in Manchester, England, that competes in the Premier League, the top flight of English football. Founded in 1880 as St. Mark's (West Gorton), they became Ardwick Association Football Club in 1887 and Manchester City in 1894. The club's home ground is the City of Manchester Stadium in east Manchester, to which they moved in 2003, having played at Maine Road since 1923. Manchester City adopted their sky blue home shirts in 1894, the first season with the current name.

The club joined the Football League in 1892, and won their first major honour, the FA Cup, in 1904. Manchester City had its first major period of success in the late 1960s and early 1970s, winning the league title, FA Cup, League Cup, and European Cup Winners Cup under the management of Joe Mercer and Malcolm Allison. After losing the 1981 FA Cup final, the club went through a period of decline, being relegated to the third tier of English football for the only time in their history in 1998. They regained promotion to the top tier in 1999–2000 and have remained in the Premier League since 2002–03.

Manchester City received major financial investment after its August 2008 takeover by Sheikh Mansour bin Zayed Al Nahyan through the Abu Dhabi United Group, starting a new era of success, winning the FA Cup in 2011 and the Premier League in 2012. Under the stewardship of Pep Guardiola between 2016 and 2026, the club won 20 honours, including the Premier League in 2018 with a record 100 points, becoming the first English men's team to win a domestic treble, claiming the three main domestic trophies as well as the Community Shield. The club also won a continental treble in 2023, and four consecutive league titles between the 2020–21 and 2023–24 seasons – an English football record.

Manchester City topped the Deloitte Football Money League at the end of the 2021–22 season, making it the football club with the highest revenue in the world, approximated at €731 million. In 2022, Forbes estimated the club was the sixth-most valuable in the world, worth $4.250 billion. Manchester City are owned by City Football Group Limited, a holding company valued at £3.73 ($4.8) billion in November 2019 and majority-owned by the Abu Dhabi United Group.

Manchester City have been accused of breaching financial rules set by UEFA and the Premier League since 2018. A total of 115 breaches over nine seasons from 2009 to 2018 were investigated by the Premier League, which formed an independent commission. The independent commission found the club guilty of all but one of the charges in 2026.

== History ==
=== Early years and first trophies ===
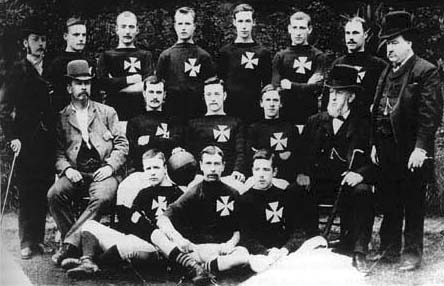
St. Marks (Gorton) in 1884 – the reason for the cross pattée on the shirts is now unknown.

City gained their first honours by winning the Second Division in 1899; with it came promotion to the highest level in English football, the First Division. They went on to claim their first major honour on 23 April 1904, beating Bolton Wanderers 1–0 at Crystal Palace to win the FA Cup; the Blues narrowly missed out on a League and Cup double that season after finishing runners-up in the league campaign, but they still became the first club in Manchester to win a major honour. In the seasons following the FA Cup triumph, the club was dogged by allegations of financial irregularities, culminating in the suspension of seventeen players in 1906, including captain Billy Meredith, who subsequently moved across town to Manchester United. A fire at Hyde Road destroyed the main stand in 1920, and in 1923 the club moved to their new purpose-built stadium at Maine Road in Moss Side.

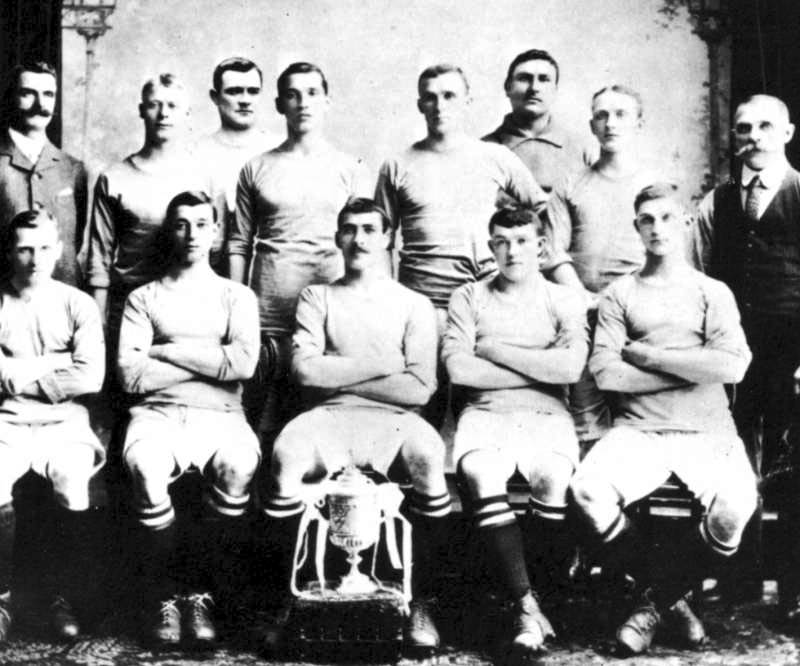
The Manchester City team which won the FA Cup in 1903–04.

In the 1930s, Manchester City reached two consecutive FA Cup finals, losing to Everton in 1933, before claiming the Cup by beating Portsmouth in 1934. During the 1934 run, the club broke the record for the highest home attendance of any club in English football history, as 84,569 fans packed Maine Road for a sixth-round FA Cup tie against Stoke City – a record which stood until 2016. The club won the First Division title for the first time in 1937, but were relegated the following season, despite scoring more goals than any other team in the division. Twenty years later, a City team inspired by a tactical system known as the Revie Plan reached consecutive FA Cup finals again, in 1955 and 1956; just as in the 1930s, they lost the first one, to Newcastle United, and won the second. The 1956 final, in which the Blues defeated Birmingham City 3–1, saw City goalkeeper Bert Trautmann continuing to play on after unknowingly breaking his neck.

=== First golden era and subsequent decline ===
After being relegated to the Second Division in 1963, the future looked bleak with a record low home attendance of 8,015 against Swindon Town in January 1965. In the summer of 1965, the management team of Joe Mercer and Malcolm Allison was appointed. In the first season under Mercer, Manchester City won the Second Division title and made important signings in Mike Summerbee and Colin Bell. Two seasons later, in 1967–68, City claimed the league championship for the second time, beating their close neighbours Manchester United to the title on the final day of the season with a 4–3 victory at Newcastle United. Further trophies followed: City won the FA Cup in 1969 and a year later triumphed in the European Cup Winners' Cup, defeating Górnik Zabrze 2–1 in the 1970 final. This was the club's only European honour until their triumph in the 2022–23 UEFA Champions League. The Blues also won the League Cup that year, becoming the second English team to win a European trophy and a domestic trophy in the same season.

The club continued to challenge for honours throughout the 1970s, finishing one point behind the league champions on two occasions and reaching the final of the 1974 League Cup. One of the matches from this period that is most fondly remembered by supporters of Manchester City is the final match of the 1973–74 season against arch-rivals Manchester United, who needed to win to have any hope of avoiding relegation. Former United player Denis Law scored with a backheel to give City a 1–0 win at Old Trafford and confirm the relegation of their rivals. The final trophy of the club's most successful period of the 20th century was won in 1976, when Newcastle United were beaten 2–1 in the League Cup final.

Chart of yearly table positions of City in the Football League

A long period of decline followed the success of the 1960s and 1970s. Malcolm Allison rejoined the club to become manager for the second time in 1979, but squandered large sums of money on several unsuccessful signings, such as Steve Daley. A succession of managers then followed – seven in the 1980s alone. Under John Bond, City reached the 1981 FA Cup final but lost in a replay to Tottenham Hotspur. The club were twice relegated from the top flight in the 1980s (in 1983 and 1987), but returned to the top flight again in 1989 under Mel Machin. Howard Kendall guided the club to top flight safety in 1990 and the club finished fifth in 1991 and 1992 under the management of active player Peter Reid. However, this was only a temporary respite, and following Reid's departure Manchester City's fortunes continued to fade. City were co-founders of the Premier League upon its creation in 1992, but after finishing ninth in its first season, Peter Swales, club chairman since 1973, was replaced by club legend Francis Lee in February 1994 in a movement supported by fans. Despite this, they endured three years of struggle under Brian Horton and Alan Ball Jr. before being relegated in dramatic fashion in 1996. After two seasons in the First Division (Note: Until 1992, the top division of English football was the Football League First Division; since then, it has been the FA Premier League. At the same time, the Second Division was renamed the First Division, and the Third Division was renamed the Second Division.) and four different permanent managers, Lee resigned from his role as chairman midway through the 1998 season, although remained as a shareholder, as City fell to the lowest point in their history, becoming the second ever European trophy winners to be relegated to their country's third-tier league after 1. FC Magdeburg of Germany.

=== Recovery and two takeovers ===
After relegation, the club underwent off-the-field upheaval, with new chairman David Bernstein introducing greater fiscal discipline. Under manager Joe Royle, City were promoted at the first attempt, achieved in dramatic fashion in the Second Division play-off final against Gillingham. A second successive promotion saw City return to the top division, but this proved to have been a step too far for the recovering club, and in 2001 City were relegated once more. Kevin Keegan replaced Royle as manager in the close season, and achieved an immediate return to the top division as the club won the 2001–02 First Division championship, breaking club records for the number of points gained and goals scored in a single season in the process. The 2002–03 season was the last at Maine Road and included a 3–1 derby victory over rivals Manchester United, ending a 13-year run without a derby win. Additionally, City qualified for European competition for the first time in 25 years via UEFA fair play ranking. In the close 2003–04 season, the club moved to the new City of Manchester Stadium. The first four seasons at the stadium all resulted in mid-table finishes. Former England manager Sven-Göran Eriksson became the club's first foreign manager when appointed in 2007. After a bright start, performances faded in the second half of the season, and Eriksson was sacked on 2 June 2008; he was replaced by Mark Hughes two days later.

By 2008, Manchester City were in a financially precarious position. Former Thai prime minister Thaksin Shinawatra had taken control of the club the year before, but his political travails saw his assets frozen. Then, in August 2008, City were purchased by the Abu Dhabi United Group. The takeover was immediately followed by a flurry of bids for high-profile players; the club broke the British transfer record by signing Brazilian international Robinho from Real Madrid for £32.5 million (€42.5 million). There was not a huge improvement in performance compared to the previous season despite the influx of money however, with the team finishing tenth, although they did well to reach the quarter-finals of the UEFA Cup. During the summer of 2009, the club took transfer spending to an unprecedented level, with an outlay of over £100 million on players Gareth Barry, Roque Santa Cruz, Kolo Touré, Emmanuel Adebayor, Carlos Tevez, and Joleon Lescott. In December 2009, Mark Hughes – who had been hired shortly before the change in ownership but was originally retained by the new board – was replaced as manager by Roberto Mancini. City finished the season in fifth position in the Premier League, narrowly missing out on a place in the Champions League but qualifying for the UEFA Europa League.

=== Second golden era: Pep Guardiola years, financial and non-cooperation charges ===
Continued investment in players followed in successive seasons, and results began to match the upturn in player quality. After heavy speculation, Roberto Mancini confirmed that a move of Edin Džeko from Wolfsburg for a fee of £27 million (€32 million) had been agreed on 3 January 2011. This was City's second highest transfer figure, after Robinho's move from Real Madrid for £32.5 million in 2008. The transfer fee was the sixth highest in Premier League history at the time. City reached the FA Cup final in 2011, their first major final in over 30 years, after defeating derby rivals Manchester United in the semi-finals, the first time they had knocked their rival out of a cup competition since 1975. The Blues defeated Stoke City 1–0 in the final, securing their fifth FA Cup and the club's first major trophy since winning the 1976 League Cup. On the last day of the 2010–11 season, City beat out Arsenal for the third place, thereby securing qualification directly into the Champions League group stage.

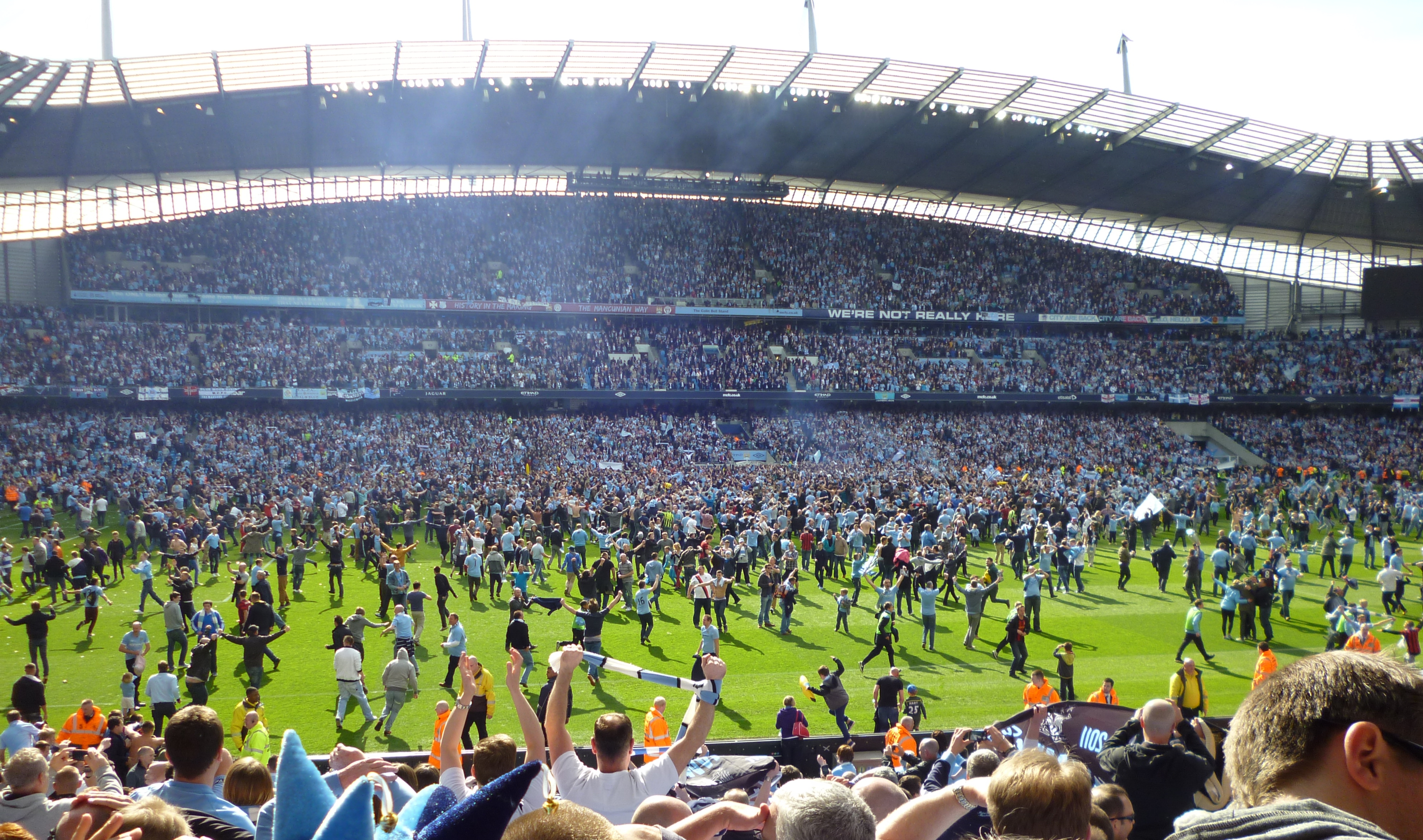
Manchester City supporters invade the pitch following their 2011–12 Premier League title victory.

Strong performances continued to follow in the 2011–12 season, including a 5–1 victory over Tottenham at White Hart Lane and a record-equalling 6–1 win over Manchester United at Old Trafford, but a poor run of form in the second half of the season left City in second place, eight points behind United with only six games left to play. At this point, United suffered their own loss of form, dropping eight points in the space of four games, while City began a run of successive wins which saw both teams level on points with two games to go. Despite the Blues only needing a home win against Queens Park Rangers, a team in the relegation zone, they fell 1–2 behind by the end of normal time. However, two goals in injury time – the second by Sergio Agüero in the fourth added minute – settled the title in City's favour, making them the first team to win the Premier League on goal difference alone.

The following season, City were unable to replicate the previous year's success. After finishing second in the league, eleven points behind Manchester United, and losing the FA Cup final 0–1 to relegated Wigan Athletic, Mancini was sacked. He was replaced by Chilean manager Manuel Pellegrini. In Pellegrini's first year in charge, City won the League Cup and regained the Premier League title on the last matchday of the season. The team's league form then slowly declined over the next couple of years, as the Blues finished second in 2014–15 and then dropped to fourth in 2015–16, although the 2015–16 season would see City win another League Cup title and reach the Champions League semi-finals for the first time.

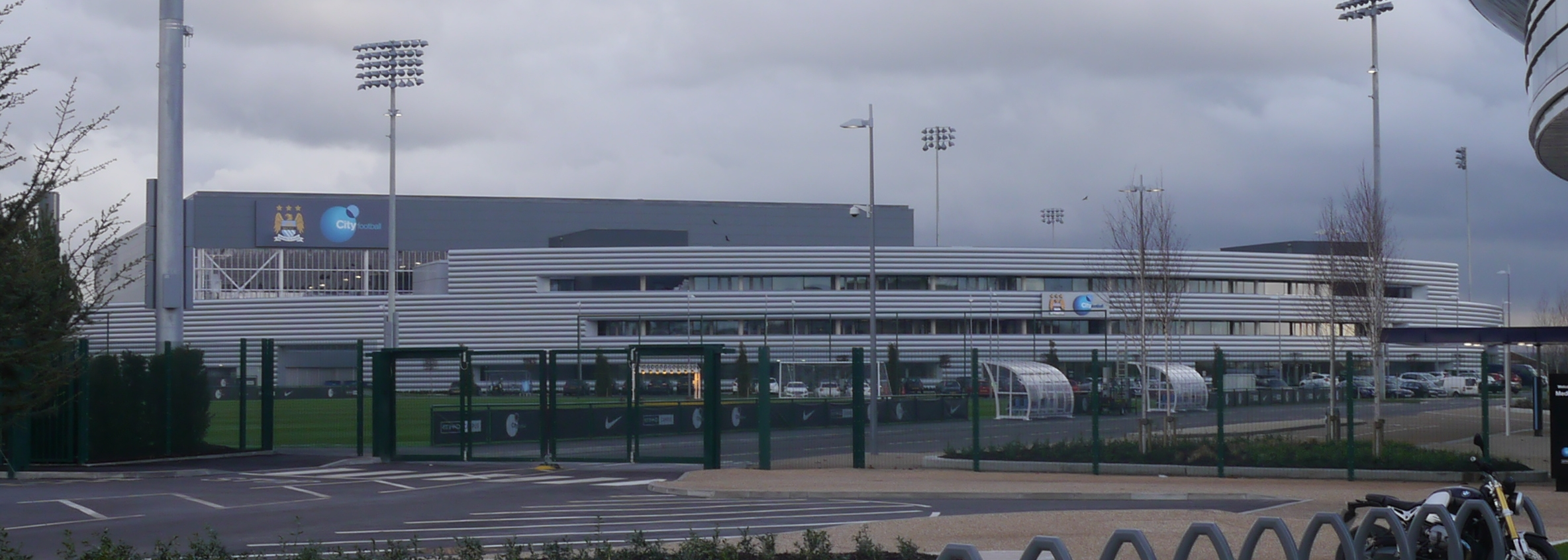
Manchester City moved into their new complex at the Etihad Campus adjacent to the City of Manchester Stadium in 2014.

Pep Guardiola, former head coach of Barcelona and Bayern Munich, was confirmed to become Manchester City's new manager on 1 February 2016, with the announcement having been made several months before Manuel Pellegrini left his position. Guardiola's first season in Manchester would end trophyless, with the Blues placing third in the league standings, but the following season proved far more successful, as City won the Premier League title with the highest points total in history and broke numerous other club and English league records along the way.

This would prove to be the start of a period of unprecedented success for Manchester City under Guardiola. Between the 2017–18 and 2023–24 Premier League seasons, City won six out of possible seven league titles, only finishing second behind Liverpool in the 2019–20 season. Guardiola also guided the Blues to silverware in domestic cup competitions, highlighted by four consecutive League Cup triumphs in 2018–2021. During the 2018–19 season, City completed an unprecedented domestic treble of English men's titles. Apart from winning all three of the major English football tournaments, they also won the Community Shield, the first time any team has ever held all four of England's primary football trophies at the same time. On the continental stage, the club achieved breakthrough in 2020–21, reaching their first-ever Champions League final. In an all-English affair, City lost 0–1 to Chelsea at the Estádio do Dragão in Porto.

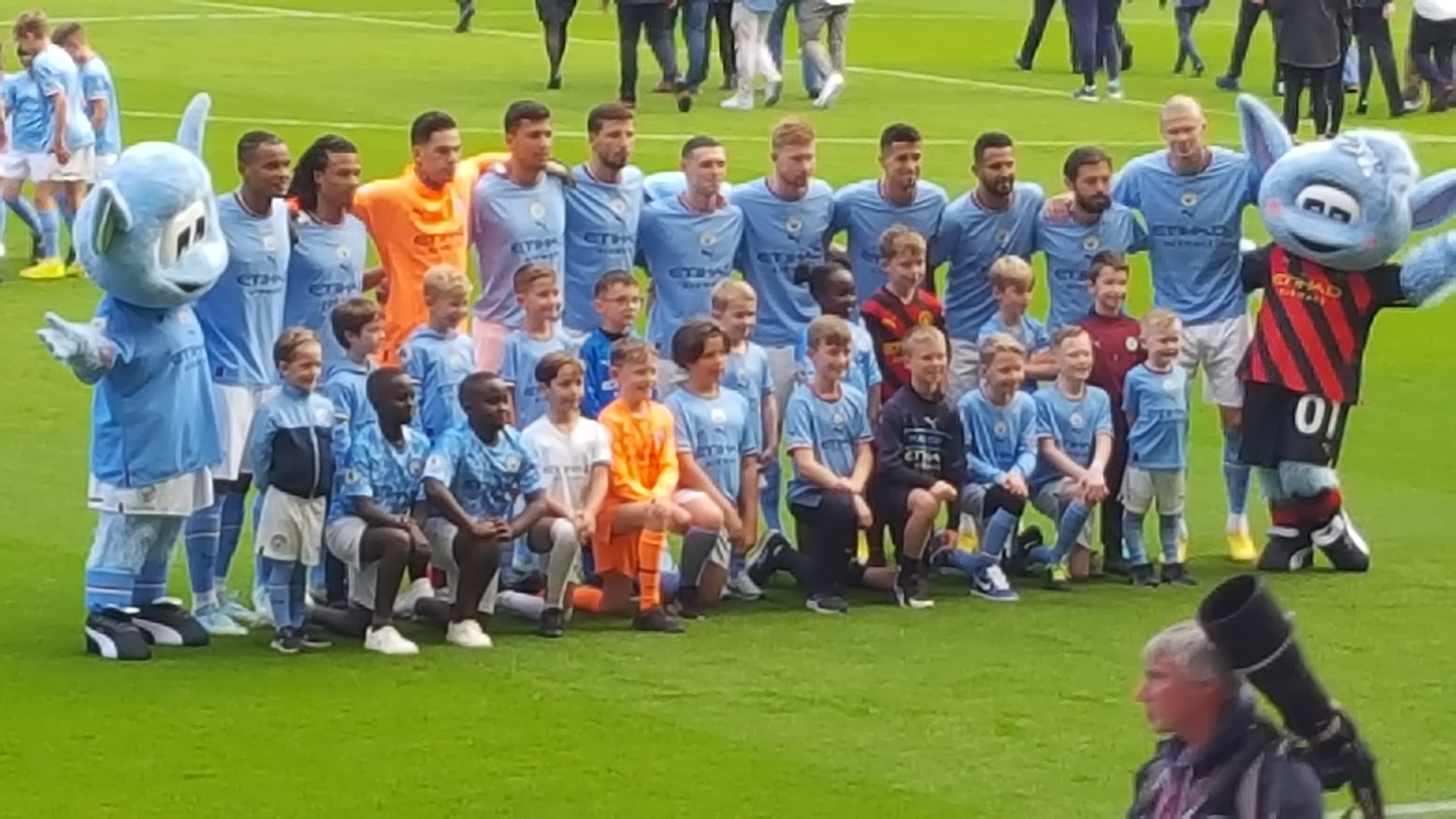
The Manchester City team, with mascots, about to face Southampton in the 2022–23 Premier League. From left to right on back row: Moonchester, Manuel Akanji, Nathan Aké, Ederson, Rodri, Rúben Dias, Phil Foden, Kevin De Bruyne, João Cancelo, Riyad Mahrez, Bernardo Silva, Erling Haaland, and Moonbeam.

The 2022–23 season turned out to be the greatest in the club's history, as Manchester City won their third consecutive Premier League title, the FA Cup final against rivals Manchester United, and their maiden Champions League title at the Atatürk Olympic Stadium in Istanbul against Inter Milan, thereby assembling a rare feat – the continental treble. The road to the Champions League victory included wins over European giants Bayern Munich, who were defeated 4–1 on aggregate, and Real Madrid, who suffered a 1–5 aggregate loss at the hands of City. In the following season City won the UEFA Super Cup and FIFA Club World Cup for the first time and became the first English men's club to claim four consecutive league titles with another Premier League title. City also advanced to the FA Cup final for the second straight year but lost in a rematch to rivals Manchester United.

In the 2024–25 season City managed to win only the Community Shield in another rematch against United. They lost that season's FA Cup final to Crystal Palace and finished third in the Premier League. In the following season, Manchester City finished runners-up in the Premier League in Guardiola's final season at the club.

Manchester City's era of sustained competitive excellence coincided with several charges of breaching Financial Fair Play (FFP) regulations. In 2020, the Court of Arbitration for Sport (CAS) overturned a two-year ban from European competition placed on the club by UEFA for violations of FFP. In 2023, the Premier League announced it had charged the club with 115 breaches of its FFP rules, from 2009 until 2018, with all the charges, financial and non-cooperation with the investigation, running from 2009–10 to 2022–23; they were found guilty on all but one of the charges in 2026, with the Premier League announcing that the independent commission had found they had arranged "sham contracts" and "sham agreements to artificially inflate the club's revenues and reduce its costs"; — accounts which facilitated their extensive transfer spend on players. The club lodged an appeal against the guilty verdict, stating the commission's ruling contained "clear material errors, of law, principle and fact and is unsafe".

=== League history ===
1892–1899 Division 2 (L2); 1899–1902 Division 1 (L1); 1902–1903 Division 2 (L2); 1903–1909 Division 1 (L1); 1909–1910 Division 2 (L2)	1910–1926 Division 1 (L1); 1926–1928 Division 2 (L2); 1928–1938 Division 1 (L1); 1938–1947 Division 2 (L2); 1947–1950 Division 1 (L1)	1950–1951 Division 2 (L2); 1951–1963 Division 1 (L1); 1963–1966 Division 2 (L2); 1966–1983 Division 1 (L1); 1983–1985 Division 2 (L2)	1985–1987 Division 1 (L1); 1987–1989 Division 2 (L2); 1989–1992 Division 1 (L1); 1992–1996 Premier League (L1); 1996–1998 Division 1 (L2)	1998–1999 Division 2 (L3); 1999–2000 Division 1 (L2); 2000–2001 Premier League (L1); 2001–2002 Division 1 (L2); 2002– Premier League (L1)

L1 = Level 1 of the football league system; L2 = Level 2 of the football league system; L3 = Level 3 of the football league system.

== Club badge and colours ==
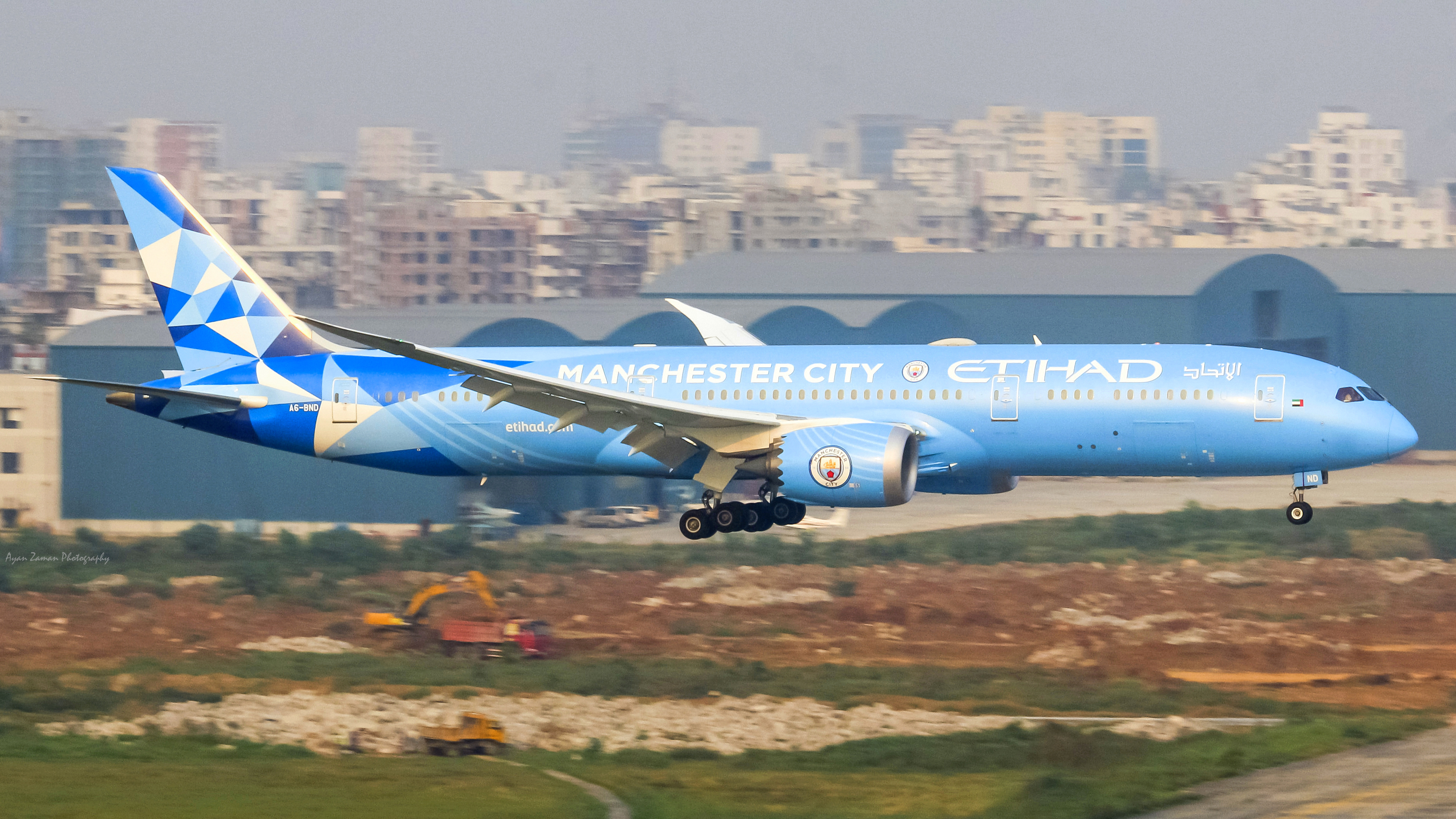
Manchester City's stadium and shirt have been sponsored by Etihad Airways since 2009.

Manchester City's home colours are sky blue and white. Traditional away kit colours have been either maroon or (from the 1960s) red and black; however, in recent years several colours have been used. The origins of the club's home colours are unclear, but there is evidence that the club has worn blue since 1892 or earlier. A booklet entitled Famous Football Clubs – Manchester City published in the 1940s indicates that West Gorton (St. Marks) originally played in scarlet and black, and reports dating from 1884 describe the team wearing black jerseys bearing a white cross, showing the club's origins as a church side. The infrequent yet recurrent use of red and black away colours comes from former assistant manager Malcolm Allison's belief that adopting the colours of AC Milan would inspire City to glory. Allison's theory seemingly took effect, with City winning the 1969 FA Cup final, 1970 League Cup final, and 1970 Cup Winners' Cup final in red and black stripes as opposed to the club's home kit of sky blue.

City had previously worn three other badges on their shirts, prior to their current badge being implemented in 2016. The first, introduced in 1970, was based on designs which had been used on official club documentation since the mid-1960s. It consisted of a circular badge which used the same shield as the present badge (including a ship, based on the City of Manchester coat of arms), inside a circle bearing the name of the club. In 1972, this was replaced by a variation which replaced the lower half of the shield with the red rose of Lancashire. In 1976, a heraldic badge was granted by the College of Arms to the English Football League for use by City. The badge consisted of the familiar ship above a red rose but on a circular device instead of a shield (blazoned as "A roundel per fess azure and argent in chief a three masted ship sails set pennons flying or in base a rose gules barbed and seeded proper").

On occasions when Manchester City played in a major cup final, the club wore shirts bearing the City of Manchester coat of arms, as a symbol of pride in representing the city at a major event. This practice originated from a time when the players' shirts did not normally bear a badge of any kind. The club has since abandoned the practice; for the 2011 FA Cup final, its first in the 21st century, City used the usual badge with a special legend, but the Manchester coat of arms was included as a small monochrome logo in the numbers on the back of players' shirts.

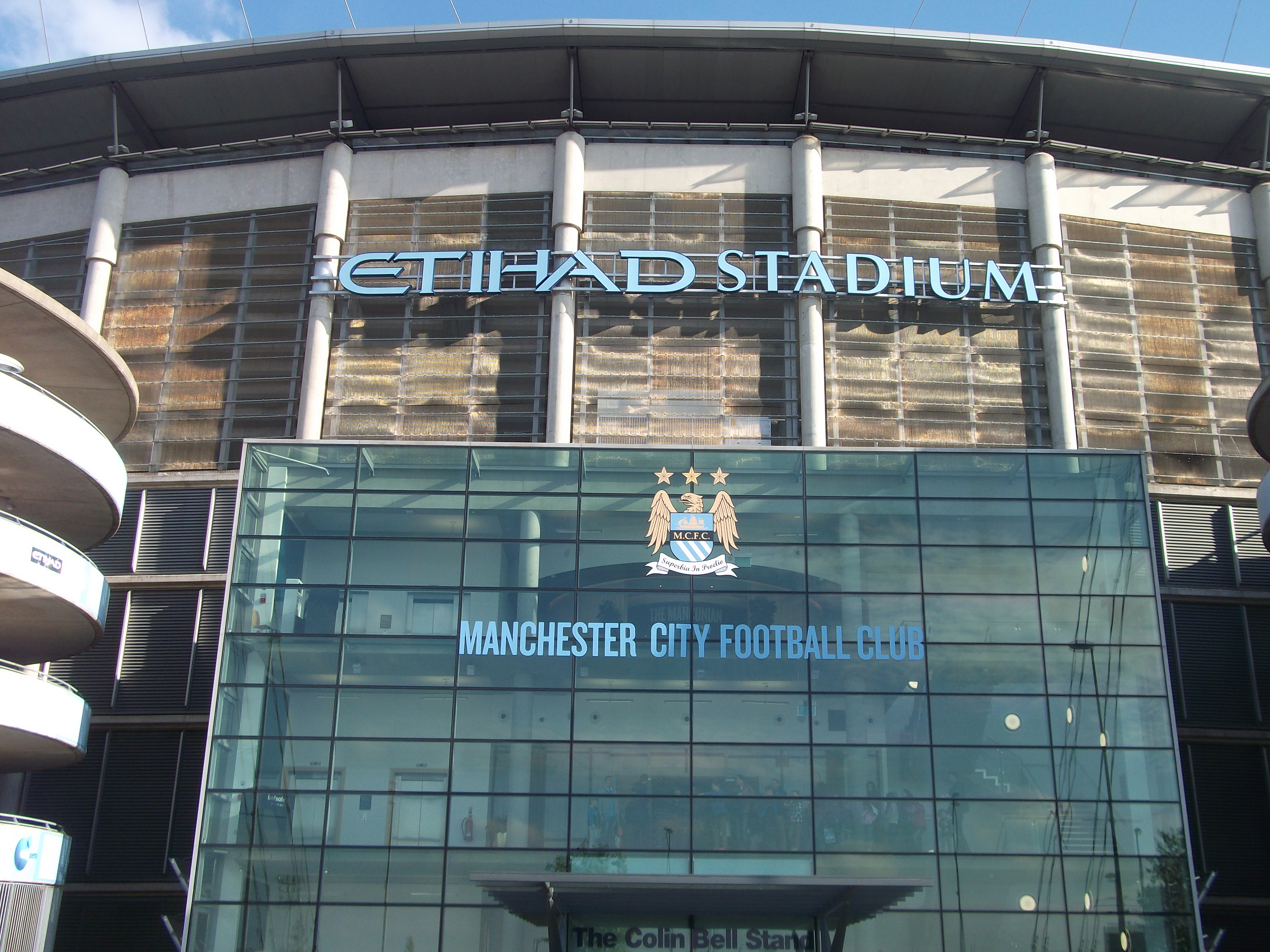
Etihad Stadium in 2015, with the club's former crest.

A new club badge was adopted in 1997, as a result of the previous badge being ineligible for registration as a trademark. This badge was based on the arms of the city of Manchester, and consisted of a shield in front of a golden eagle. The eagle is an old heraldic symbol of the city of Manchester; a golden eagle was added to the city's badge in 1958 (but had since been removed), representing the growing aviation industry. The shield featured a ship on its upper half representing the Manchester Ship Canal, and three diagonal stripes in the lower half symbolised the city's three rivers – the Irwell, the Irk and the Medlock. The bottom of the badge bore the motto "Superbia in Proelio", which translates as "Pride in Battle" in Latin. Above the eagle and shield were the three stars, added for decorative purposes.

On 16 October 2015, following years of criticism from the fans over the design of the 1997 badge, the club announced they intended to carry out a fan consultation on whether to discontinue the current badge and institute a new design. After the consultation, the club announced in late November 2015 the badge would be replaced in due course by a new version which would be designed in the style of the older, circular variants. A design purporting to be the new badge was unintentionally leaked two days early prior to the official unveiling on 26 December 2015 by the IPO when the design was trademarked on 22 December. The new badge was officially unveiled at Manchester City's home match against Sunderland on 26 December.

=== Kit suppliers and shirt sponsors ===
Period	Kit supplier	Shirt sponsor (chest)	Shirt sponsor (sleeve)
1974–1982	Umbro	No sponsor	No sponsor
1982–1984	Umbro	Saab	No sponsor
1984–1987	Umbro	Philips	No sponsor
1987–1997	Umbro	Brother	No sponsor
1997–1999	Kappa	Brother	No sponsor
1999–2002	Le Coq Sportif	Eidos	No sponsor
2002–2003	Le Coq Sportif	First Advice	No sponsor
2003–2004	Reebok	First Advice	No sponsor
2004–2007	Reebok	Thomas Cook	No sponsor
2007–2009	Le Coq Sportif	Thomas Cook	No sponsor
2009–2013	Umbro	Etihad Airways	No sponsor
2013–2017	Nike	Etihad Airways	No sponsor
2017–2019	Nike	Etihad Airways	Nexen Tire
2019–2023	Puma	Etihad Airways	Nexen Tire
2023–present	Puma	Etihad Airways	OKX

=== Kit deals ===
Kit supplier	Period	Announcement date	Intended contract duration	Value	Notes
Le Coq Sportif	2007–2009	13 May 2007	2007–2011 (4 years)	Around £2.5m per year	Replaced by Umbro contract
Umbro	2009–2013	4 June 2009	2009–2019 (10 years)	Around £2.5m per year	Umbro contract transferred to parent company Nike in 2013
Nike	2013–2019	4 May 2012	2013–2019 (6 years)	Around £20m per year	
Puma	2019–2025	28 February 2019	2019–2029 (10 years)	Around £65m per year	Contract renegotiated
Puma	2025–	15 July 2025	2025–2035 (10 years)	£100 million per year	

== Players ==
=== First-team squad ===
As of 2 September 2026

Note: Flags indicate national team as defined under FIFA eligibility rules; some limited exceptions apply. Players may hold more than one non-FIFA nationality.

No.	Pos.	Nation	Player
1	GK	ITA	Gianluigi Donnarumma (vice-captain)
3	DF	POR	Rúben Dias (captain)
5	MF	ENG	Elliot Anderson
6	DF	ENG	Marc Guéhi (vice-captain)
7	FW	SEN	Iliman Ndiaye
8	MF	CRO	Mateo Kovačić
9	FW	NOR	Erling Haaland (vice-captain)
10	MF	FRA	Rayan Cherki
11	FW	BEL	Jérémy Doku
13	GK	ENG	Marcus Bettinelli
17	MF	ARG	Enzo Fernández
21	DF	ALG	Rayan Aït-Nouri
22	DF	BRA	Vitor Reis

No.	Pos.	Nation	Player
24	DF	CRO	Joško Gvardiol
27	DF	POR	Matheus Nunes
28	GK	ARG	Gerónimo Rulli
32	MF	MAR	Ayyoub Bouaddi
33	MF	ENG	Nico O'Reilly
37	FW	BRA	Allan
42	FW	GHA	Antoine Semenyo
45	DF	UZB	Abdukodir Khusanov
47	MF	ENG	Phil Foden
56	FW	ENG	Ryan McAidoo
61	DF	ENG	Kaden Braithwaite
75	MF	GER	Floyd Samba
82	DF	ENG	Rico Lewis

Out on loan

Note: Flags indicate national team as defined under FIFA eligibility rules; some limited exceptions apply. Players may hold more than one non-FIFA nationality.

No.	Pos.	Nation	Player
18	MF	ENG	Jack Grealish (at Everton until 30 June 2027)
30	MF	ARG	Claudio Echeverri (at Benfica until 30 June 2027)
40	MF	ENG	Jeremy Monga (at Swansea City until 30 June 2027)
41	MF	NOR	Sverre Nypan (at Lommel until 30 June 2027)

No.	Pos.	Nation	Player
44	MF	ENG	Kalvin Phillips (at Sheffield United until 30 June 2027)
68	DF	ENG	Max Alleyne (at Burnley until 30 June 2027)
—	GK	NIR	Pierce Charles (at Queens Park Rangers until 30 June 2027)
—	FW	EGY	Omar Marmoush (at Tottenham Hotspur until 30 June 2027)

=== EDS and Academy ===
The following players have previously made appearances or have appeared on the substitutes bench for the first team.

Note: Flags indicate national team as defined under FIFA eligibility rules; some limited exceptions apply. Players may hold more than one non-FIFA nationality.

No.	Pos.	Nation	Player
59	DF	ENG	Josh Wilson-Esbrand
69	GK	WAL	Max Hudson
76	MF	ENG	Dexter Oliver

No.	Pos.	Nation	Player
90	DF	ENG	Kian Noble
97	FW	ENG	Tyrone Samba

Out on loan

Note: Flags indicate national team as defined under FIFA eligibility rules; some limited exceptions apply. Players may hold more than one non-FIFA nationality.

No.	Pos.	Nation	Player
59	MF	ENG	Charlie Gray (at Wigan Athletic until 30 June 2027)
63	MF	ENG	Divine Mukasa (at West Ham United until 30 June 2027)
67	FW	ENG	Divin Mubama (at Southampton until 30 June 2027)
80	GK	ENG	Spike Brits (at Sutton United until 30 June 2027)

No.	Pos.	Nation	Player
81	FW	ENG	Jaden Heskey (at Sheffield Wednesday until 30 June 2027)
91	DF	ENG	Stephen Mfuni (at Coventry City until 30 June 2027)
—	FW	FRA	Mathys Detourbet (at Monaco until 30 June 2027)

=== Retired numbers ===
Since 2003, Manchester City have not issued the squad number 23. It was retired in memory of Marc-Vivien Foé, who was on loan to the club from Lyon at the time of his death on the field of play while playing for Cameroon in the 2003 FIFA Confederations Cup.

Note: Flags indicate national team as defined under FIFA eligibility rules; some limited exceptions apply. Players may hold more than one non-FIFA nationality.

No.	Pos.	Nation	Player
23	MF	CMR	Marc-Vivien Foé (2002–03 – posthumous honour)

=== Club captains ===
This is a list of City's official club captains, who are currently appointed via a vote of players and staff. Other players (vice-captains) have led the team on the pitch when the club captain is not playing or not available. Some players have been made captain on a one-off basis to celebrate or commemorate an event, e.g. Oleksandr Zinchenko captained the team in their 2021–22 FA Cup fifth round tie at Peterborough United in support of his country during the 2022 Russian invasion of Ukraine.

Years	Pos	Captain
1904–1906	FW	(Wales) Billy Meredith
1906–1914	FW	(Wales) Lot Jones
1914–1919	No competitive football due to the First World War	
1919–1923	DF	(England) Eli Fletcher
1923–1925	DF	(England) Max Woosnam
1926–1928	MF	(Scotland) Charlie Pringle
1928–1932	MF	(Scotland) Jimmy McMullan
1932–1935	DF	(England) Sam Cowan
1935–1936	MF	(Scotland) Matt Busby
1937–1939	MF	(Scotland) Les McDowall

Years	Pos	Captain
1939–1946	No competitive football due to the Second World War	
1946–1947	GK	(England) Frank Swift
1947–1950	DF	(England) Eric Westwood
1950–1957	DF	(Wales) Roy Paul
1957–1961	MF	(England) Ken Barnes
1961–1964	DF	(England) Bill Leivers
1965–1967	FW	(Northern Ireland) Johnny Crossan
1967–1974	DF	(England) Tony Book
1974–1975	MF	(England) Colin Bell
1975–1976	DF	(England) Mike Doyle

Years	Pos	Captain
1976–1979	DF	(England) David Watson
1979–1986	DF/MF	(England) Paul Power
1986–1988	DF	(England) Kenny Clements
1988–1992	DF	(England) Steve Redmond
1992–1993	DF	(Republic of Ireland) Terry Phelan
1993–1996	DF	(England) Keith Curle
1996–1998	DF	(Wales) Kit Symons
1998	MF	(England) Jamie Pollock
1998–2000	DF	(Scotland) Andy Morrison
2000–2001	DF/MF	(Norway) Alf-Inge Haaland

Years	Pos	Captain
2001–2002	DF	(England) Stuart Pearce
2002–2003	MF	(Algeria) Ali Benarbia
2003–2006	DF	(France) Sylvain Distin
2006–2009	DF	(Republic of Ireland) Richard Dunne
2009–2010	DF	(Ivory Coast) Kolo Touré
2010–2011	FW	(Argentina) Carlos Tevez
2011–2019	DF	(Belgium) Vincent Kompany
2019–2020	MF	(Spain) David Silva
2020–2022	MF	(Brazil) Fernandinho
2022–2023	MF	(Germany) İlkay Gündoğan

Years	Pos	Captain
2023–2025	DF	(England) Kyle Walker
2025	MF	(Belgium) Kevin De Bruyne
2025–2026	MF	(Portugal) Bernardo Silva
2026–	DF	(Portugal) Ruben Dias

=== Player of the Year ===
Each season since the end of the 1966–67 season, the members of the Manchester City Official Supporters Club have voted by ballot to choose the player on the team they feel is the most worthy of recognition for his performances during that season. The following table lists the recipients of this award since 2000.

Year	Winner
2000–01	(Australia) Danny Tiatto
2001–02	(Algeria) Ali Benarbia
2002–03	(France) Sylvain Distin
2003–04	(England) Shaun Wright-Phillips
2004–05	(Republic of Ireland) Richard Dunne
2005–06	(Republic of Ireland) Richard Dunne
2006–07	(Republic of Ireland) Richard Dunne
2007–08	(Republic of Ireland) Richard Dunne
2008–09	(Republic of Ireland) Stephen Ireland
2009–10	(Argentina) Carlos Tevez

Year	Winner
2010–11	(Belgium) Vincent Kompany
2011–12	(Argentina) Sergio Agüero
2012–13	(Argentina) Pablo Zabaleta
2013–14	(Ivory Coast) Yaya Touré
2014–15	(Argentina) Sergio Agüero
2015–16	(Belgium) Kevin De Bruyne
2016–17	(Spain) David Silva
2017–18	(Belgium) Kevin De Bruyne
2018–19	(Portugal) Bernardo Silva
2019–20	(Belgium) Kevin De Bruyne

Year	Winner
2020–21	(Portugal) Rúben Dias
2021–22	(Belgium) Kevin De Bruyne
2022–23	(Norway) Erling Haaland
2023–24	(England) Phil Foden
2024–25	(Croatia) Joško Gvardiol
2025–26	(England) Nico O'Reilly

== Halls of Fame ==
=== Manchester City Hall of Fame ===
The following former Manchester City players and managers have been inducted into the Manchester City F.C. Hall of Fame, and are listed according to the year of their induction:

Inductees at the MCFC Hall of Fame
Year of induction	Player	Position	Role at MCFC	Years in role at MCFC	Notes
Year of induction	Manchester City players who were the inaugural inductees in January 2004				
2004	(Wales) Billy Meredith	FW (outside right)	player	1894–1906, 1921–1924	also see NFM Hall of Fame
2004	(England) Tommy Johnson	FW (centre forward) & (inside left)	player	1919–1930	
2004	(England) Eric Brook	FW (outside left)	player	1928–1939	
2004	(England) Frank Swift	GK	player	1933–1949	also see NFM Hall of Fame
2004	(Northern Ireland) Peter Doherty	FW (inside left)	player	1936–1945	also see NFM Hall of Fame
2004	(Wales) Roy Clarke	FW (outside left)	player	1947–1958	Lifetime achievement award
2004	(Germany) Bert Trautmann, OBE	GK	player	1949–1964	also see NFM Hall of Fame
2004	(Wales) Roy Paul	MF (half back)	player	1950–1957	
2004	(England) Mike Summerbee	FW / MF (outside right)	player	1965–1975	also see NFM Hall of Fame
2004	(England) Tony Book	DF (right back)	player manager	1966–1974; 1973, 1974–1979, 1980, 1989, 1993	
2004	(England) Colin Bell, MBE	MF	player	1966–1979	also see NFM Hall of Fame
2004	(England) Francis Lee	FW	player chairman	1967–1974; 1994–1998	also see NFM Hall of Fame
2004	(England) Joe Corrigan	GK	player	1967–1983	
2004	(England) Paul Lake	FW / MF / DF	player	1987–1996	
2004	(Republic of Ireland) Niall Quinn, (Honorary) MBE	FW	player	1990–1996	also see NFM Hall of Fame
	Manchester City players and teams inducted since 2004				
2005	(England) Sam Cowan	DF (centre half)	player manager	1924–1935; 1946–1947	
2005	(England) Ken Barnes	MF (wing half)	player	1950–1961	Lifetime achievement award
2005	(England) Alan Oakes	MF	player	1958–1976	
2005	(England) Joe Mercer, OBE	MF (left half)	manager	1965–1971	Outstanding achievement award also see NFM Hall of Fame
2005	(England) Malcolm Allison	DF (centre half)	assistant mgr. manager	1965–1971; 1971–1973, 1979–1980	Outstanding achievement award also see NFM Hall of Fame
2006	(England) Ernie Toseland	FW (outside right)	player	1928–1938	
2006	(England) Johnny Hart	FW (inside forward)	player manager	1947–1960; 1973	Lifetime achievement award
2006	(England) Manchester City 1955–56 FA Cup-winning team	not applicable			en masse induction
2006	(England) Mike Doyle	DF / MF	player	1965–1978	
2006	(Bermuda) Shaun Goater	FW	player	1998–2003	Cult hero award
2008	(England) Fred Tilson	FW (centre forward)	player	1928–1939	
2008	(England) Neil Young	FW (outside left) & (inside left)	player	1961–1972	
2008	(England) Alex Williams, MBE	GK	player	1980–1986	Lifetime achievement award
2009	(Germany) Uwe Rösler	FW	player	1994–1998	

=== National Football Museum Hall of Fame ===
The following former Manchester City players and managers have been inducted into the English Football Hall of Fame (National Football Museum Hall of Fame), and are listed according to the year of their induction within the various categories:

Inductees at the NFM Hall of Fame
Year of induction	Player	Position	Role at MCFC	Years in role at MCFC
Year of induction	Players with Manchester City backgrounds inducted to date			
2002	(Northern Ireland) Peter Doherty	inside left	player	1936–1945
2002	(Scotland) Denis Law, CBE	forward & midfielder	player	1960–1961; 1973–1974
2002	(England) Kevin Keegan, OBE	forward	manager	2001–2005
2003	(Denmark) Peter Schmeichel, MBE	goalkeeper	player	2002–2003
2003	(England) Alan Ball, MBE	attacking midfielder	manager	1995–1996
2005	(Germany) Bert Trautmann, OBE	goalkeeper	player	1949–1964
2005	(England) Colin Bell, MBE	attacking midfielder	player	1966–1979
2007	(Wales) Billy Meredith	right winger	player	1894–1906; 1921–1924
2007	(England) Peter Beardsley	midfielder	player	1998
2007	(Wales) Mark Hughes	forward	manager	2008–2009
2009	(England) Frank Swift	goalkeeper	player	1933–1949
2010	(England) Francis Lee, CBE	forward	player	1967–1974
2013	(England) Mike Summerbee	forward	player	1965–1975
2014	(England) Trevor Francis	centre forward	player	1981–1982
2014	(France) Patrick Vieira	holding midfielder	player EDS manager	2010–2011; 2011–2015
2015	(England) Stuart Pearce, MBE	left back	player coach manager	2001–2002; 2002–2005; 2005–2007
2015	(China) Sun Jihai	defender	player	2002–2008
2016	(England) David Seaman MBE	goalkeeper	player	2003–2004
2017	(England) Frank Lampard OBE	attacking midfielder	player	2014–2015
2020	(England) Justin Fashanu	centre forward	player	1989
2023	(Belgium) Vincent Kompany	defender	player	2008–2019
	Managers with Manchester City backgrounds inducted to date			
2002	(Scotland) Sir Matt Busby, CBE, KCSG	inside right & right half	player	1928–1936
2004	(England) Don Revie, OBE	centre forward	player	1951–1956
2005	(England) Howard Kendall	attacking midfielder	manager	1989–1990
2009	(England) Joe Mercer, OBE	left half	manager	1965–1971
2009	(England) Malcolm Allison	centre half	assistant mgr. manager	1965–1971; 1971–1973; 1979–1980
	Manchester City "Football Foundation Community Champions" inducted to date			
2007	(Republic of Ireland) Niall Quinn, (Honorary) MBE	forward	player	1990–1996
	Manchester City teams inducted to date			
2009	(England) Manchester City league- and European cup-winning team of 1967–1970	not applicable		

Last updated: 21 July 2021.
Source: list of NFM Hall of Fame inductees

=== Premier League Hall of Fame ===
The following former Manchester City players have been inducted into the Premier League Hall of Fame. Inaugurated in 2020, but delayed for a year due to the COVID-19 pandemic, the Hall of Fame is intended to recognise and honour players that have achieved great success and made a significant contribution to the league since its founding in 1992.

Inductees at the Premier League Hall of Fame
Year of induction	Player	Position	Role at MCFC	Years in role at MCFC
Year of induction	Players with Manchester City backgrounds inducted to date			
2021	(England) Frank Lampard, OBE	attacking midfielder	player	2014–2015
2022	(France) Patrick Vieira	midfielder	player EDS manager	2010–2011; 2011–2015
2022	(Denmark) Peter Schmeichel	goalkeeper	player	2002–2003
2022	(Belgium) Vincent Kompany	defender	player	2008–2019
2022	(Argentina) Sergio Agüero	striker	player	2011–2021
2024	(England) Andy Cole	striker	player	2005–2006

Last updated: 22 April 2024.
Source: list of PL Hall of Fame inductees

=== Scottish Football Museum Hall of Fame ===
The following former Manchester City players and managers have been inducted into the Scottish Football Hall of Fame (a.k.a. the Scottish Football Museum Hall of Fame), and are listed according to the year of their induction within the various categories:

Inductees at the SFM Hall of Fame
Year of induction	Player
Year of induction	Players with Manchester City backgrounds inducted to date
2004	(Scotland) Denis Law
2004	(Scotland) Billy McNeill, MBE
2010	(Scotland) Bobby Johnstone
	Managers with Manchester City backgrounds inducted to date
2004	(Scotland) Matt Busby, CBE, KCSG

Last updated: 30 March 2011.
Source: list of SFM Hall of Fame inductees

=== Welsh Sports Hall of Fame ===
The following former Manchester City players have been inducted into the Welsh Sports Hall of Fame, and are listed according to the year of their induction:

Inductees at the Welsh Sports Hall of Fame
Year of induction	Player
Year of induction	Players with Manchester City backgrounds inducted to date
1990	(Wales) Billy Meredith
1999	(Wales) Horace Blew

== Non-playing staff ==
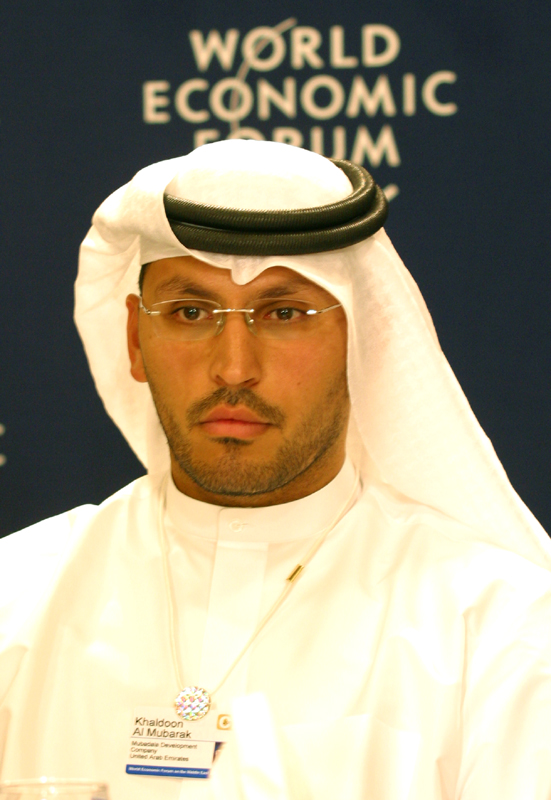
Chairman Khaldoon Al Mubarak

=== Executive ===
Position	Name
Owner	(United Arab Emirates) Mansour bin Zayed Al Nahyan
Chairman	(United Arab Emirates) Khaldoon Al Mubarak
Members of the Board	(United States) Martin Edelman (Italy) Alberto Galassi (England) Simon Pearce (United Arab Emirates) Abdulla Khouri (England) John MacBeath
Honorary Presidents	(England) Raymond Donn (England) Sir Richard Leese
Chief executive officer	(Spain) Ferran Soriano
Director of football	(Portugal) Hugo Viana
Operations Director	(England) Danny Wilson
Club ambassadors	(Argentina) Sergio Agüero (England) Mike Summerbee (Scotland) Paul Dickov (England) Micah Richards (Argentina) Pablo Zabaleta (England) Joleon Lescott (England) Shaun Wright-Phillips
Project Officer	(England) Steph Houghton

=== First Team staff ===
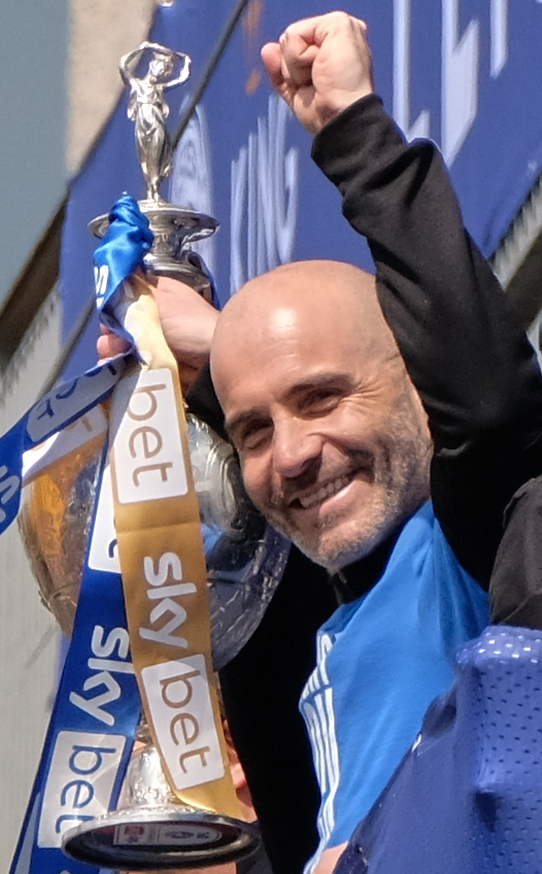
Enzo Maresca is the current manager of Manchester City.

Position	Name
Manager	(Italy) Enzo Maresca
Assistant manager	(Italy) Roberto Vitiello
First team coaches	(Argentina) Willy Caballero (Spain) Denis Silva (England) Danny Walker
Head of goalkeeping	(Italy) Michele De Bernardin
Goalkeeper coach	(England) Richard Wright
Set-piece coach	(England) James French
Club Doctors	(Spain) Edu Mauri (Italy) Max Sala
First Team Physiotherapists	(England) Alex Owen (England) Matthew Connery (Italy) Mario Pafundi (England) Nick Oakley (England) Stuart Irwin (England) Ben Thompson
Head of player support	Vacant
Fitness coach	(Spain) Marcos Álvarez
Medical Director Physiotherapy	(England) James Baldwin
Head of Physical Performance	(England) Chris Elderkin
Head of Rehabilitation	(England) Michael Giakoumis
Rehab coaches	(England) Anthony Greenhouse (England) Thomas O'Malley (Republic of Ireland) Barry Hamilton (England) Jason O'Keefe
Performance Manager	(Italy) Federico Genovesi
Chief Analyst	(England) Harry Dunn
Match Analysts	(England) Daniel Wright (England) Ryan DeFreitas (England) Dan Payne (Spain) Carles Safont (England) James Hume (England) Callum Jones
Opposition Analyst	(England) Craig Nosworthy
Head of Scouting	(England) Gary Worthington
First Team Scouts	(Northern Ireland) Chris Baird (England) John Gannon (Poland) Andy Sasimowicz (Spain) David Fernández (Spain) Ruben Mato (Republic of Ireland) Michael Collins (Republic of Ireland) Brendan MacFarlane (Colombia) Pablo Alba (Portugal) Carlos Magalhães (Denmark) Mohammed Hamad (England) Alan Watson (Spain) Ruben Comendez
Sports Scientist	(Spain) Francesc Cos
Head of Methodology	(England) Mark Leyland
Sports Technology Coordinator	(England) Ravi Mistry

=== Academy staff ===
Position	Name
Head of academy	(Germany) Thomas Krucken
Under-23 EDS manager	(Germany) Oliver Reiss
Head of Academy Coaching	(Germany) Jan-Moritz Lichte
Academy Goalkeeping coordinator	(Germany) Philipp Birker
Under-23 EDS assistant manager	(England) Craig Mudd
Under-23 GK coach	(Spain) Imanol Egaña
Under-18 Academy manager	(England) Lauris Coggin
Under-18 Academy assistant manager	(England) Jamie Carr
Under-18 Academy assistant manager	(Republic of Ireland) Richard Dunne
Under-18 Academy GK coach	(England) Max Johnson
Chief scout	(Italy) Carlo Cancellieri
Head of Academy Physiotherapy	(England) Matthew Connery
Head of Youth Scouting	(England) James Sharman (England) Samuel Fagbemi (England) Phil Robinson

=== Notable managers ===
Manchester City managers to have won major honours. Table correct as of 24 May 2026 (Note: The following managers have all won at least one major trophy with Manchester City (totals include competitive matches only). Cup matches won or lost on penalties are classified as draws.)

Name	From	To	Matches	Wins	Draws	Loss	Win %	
(Scotland) Tom Maley	1902	1906	150	89	22	39	59.33	1 FA Cup
(England) Wilf Wild	1932	1946	352	158	71	123	44.89	1 First Division title 1 FA Cup, 1 Charity Shield
(Scotland) Les McDowall	1950	1963	592	220	127	245	37.16	1 FA Cup
(England) Joe Mercer	1965	1971	340	149	94	97	43.82	1 First Division title 1 FA Cup, 1 League Cup, 1 Charity Shield, 1 Cup Winners' Cup
(England) Tony Book	1973	1980	269	114	75	80	42.38	1 League Cup
(Italy) Roberto Mancini	2009	2013	191	113	38	40	59.16	1 Premier League title 1 FA Cup, 1 Community Shield
(Chile) Manuel Pellegrini (Note: Pellegrini's drawn games include one cup match won on penalties.)	2013	2016	167	100	28	39	59.88	1 Premier League title 2 League Cups
(Spain) Pep Guardiola (Note: Guardiola's drawn games include six cup matches won and three lost on penalties.)	2016	2026	593	416	87	90	70.15	6 Premier League titles 3 FA Cups, 5 League Cups, 3 Community Shields, 1 UEFA Champions League title, 1 UEFA Super Cup, 1 FIFA Club World Cup

== Supporters ==
Since moving to the City of Manchester Stadium, the club's average attendances have been in the top six in England, usually in excess of 40,000. Even in the late 1990s, when City were relegated twice in three seasons and playing in the third tier of English football (then the Second Division, now the EFL League One), home attendances were in the region of 30,000, compared to an average of fewer than 8,000 for the division. Research carried out by Manchester City in 2005 estimated a fanbase of 886,000 in the United Kingdom and a total in excess of 2 million worldwide, although since the purchase of the club by Sheikh Mansour, and City's recent achievements, that figure has since ballooned to many times that size.

Manchester City's officially recognised supporters club is the Manchester City F.C. Supporters Club (1949), formed by a merger of two existing organisations in 2010: the Official Supporters Club (OSC) and the Centenary Supporters Association (CSA). City fans' song of choice is a rendition of "Blue Moon", which despite its melancholic theme is belted out with gusto as though it were a heroic anthem. City supporters tend to believe that unpredictability is an inherent trait of their team, and label unexpected results "typical City". Events that fans regard as "typical City" include the club being the only reigning English champions ever to be relegated (in 1938), the only team to score and concede over 100 goals in the same season (1957–58), or the more recent example where Manchester City were the only team to beat Chelsea in the latter's record-breaking 2004–05 Premier League season, yet in the same season City were knocked out of the FA Cup by Oldham Athletic, a team two divisions lower.

In the late 1980s, City fans started a craze of bringing inflatable objects to matches, primarily oversized bananas. One disputed explanation for the phenomenon is that in a match against West Bromwich Albion, chants from fans calling for the introduction of Imre Varadi as a substitute mutated into "Imre Banana". Terraces packed with inflatable-waving supporters became a frequent sight in the 1988–89 season, as the craze spread to other clubs (inflatable fish were seen at Grimsby Town), with the craze reaching its peak at City's match at Stoke City on 26 December 1988, a game declared by fanzines as a fancy dress party. In 2010, Manchester City supporters adopted an exuberant dance, dubbed The Poznań, from fans of Polish club Lech Poznań that they played in the Europa League. In 2022, Manchester City proposed the release of the Connected Scarf, that would contain a sensor tracking physiological and emotional data of the wearer, for supporters in 2023.

== Rivalries ==
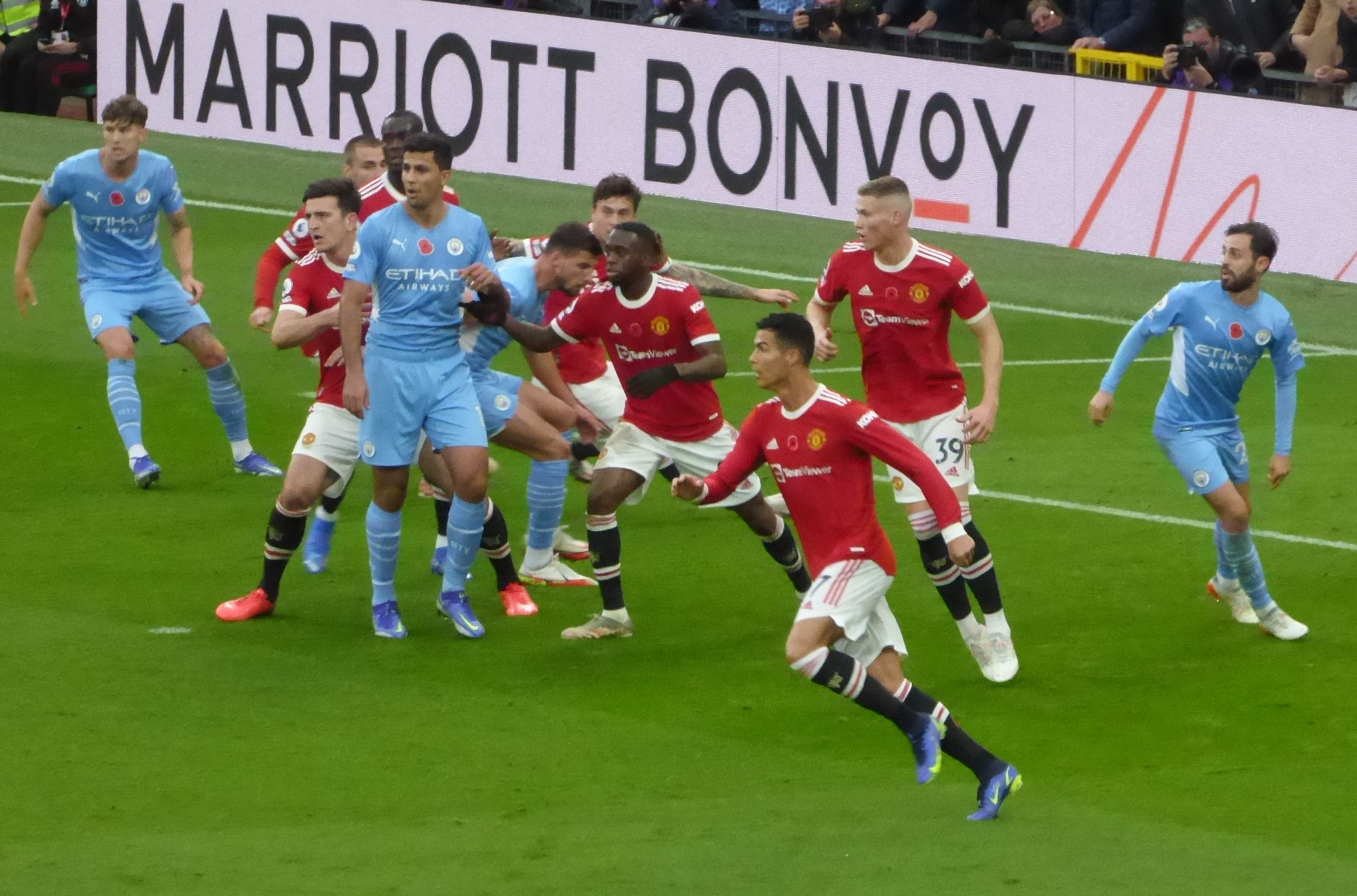
The Manchester derby in the Premier League, 6 November 2021

Manchester City's biggest rivalry is with neighbours Manchester United, against whom they contest the Manchester derby. Before the Second World War, when travel to away games was rare, many Mancunian football fans regularly watched both teams even if considering themselves "supporters" of only one. This practice continued into the early 1960s but as travel became easier, and the cost of entry to matches rose, watching both teams became unusual and the rivalry intensified. A common stereotype is that City fans come from Manchester proper, while United fans come from elsewhere. A 2002 report by a researcher at Manchester Metropolitan University found that while it was true that a higher proportion of City season ticket holders came from Manchester postcode areas (40% compared to United's 29%), there were more United season ticket holders, the lower percentage being due to United's higher overall number of season ticket holders (27,667 compared to City's 16,481). The report noted that since the compiling of data in 2001, the number of both City and United season ticket holders had risen; expansion of United's ground and City's move to the City of Manchester Stadium have caused season ticket sales to increase further.

Over the last few years, Manchester City has also developed a notable rivalry with Liverpool, currently considered one of the biggest in association football. Though the two clubs had been involved in a title race in the 1976–77 season, Liverpool and City's modern rivalry began in the 2010s, with the Blues beating Liverpool to the 2013–14 title by just two points on the final day of the season. In the final of the 2015–16 League Cup, City defeated Liverpool on penalties after a 1–1 draw. The two clubs met in European competition for the first time in the 2017–18 Champions League quarter-finals, where Liverpool won 5–1 on aggregate, ultimately reaching the final and then winning the competition a year later. In the 2018–19 season, City again won the title on the final day, with the Blues' 98 points and Liverpool's 97 being the third- and fourth-highest Premier League points totals ever. The following season, Liverpool clinched the title, recording 99 points (the second-highest Premier League total ever after Manchester City's 100 in 2017–18) to finish 18 points above runners-up City. The Blues then regained the title in 2020–21 and outgunned Liverpool in another closely-fought title race in 2021–22, to finish with 93 points to Liverpool's 92.

The success of the two teams in the 2010s and 2020s has led to the development of a rivalry between Jürgen Klopp and Pep Guardiola, the managers of Liverpool and Manchester City, with the two previously having been the respective managers of Der Klassiker rivals Borussia Dortmund and Bayern Munich in the Bundesliga. At the end of the 2018–19 season, Guardiola described his relationship with Klopp as a "beautiful rivalry" and called Klopp's Liverpool team "the strongest opponents I have faced in my career as a manager". In September 2019, Klopp hailed Guardiola for being his 'greatest rival ever', after both were nominated for the FIFA Men's Coach of the Year award in 2019, which Klopp ultimately won. In a 2019 survey, City fans answered that Liverpool, and not Manchester United, are the club's biggest rivals.

Manchester City also have long established local rivalries with Bolton Wanderers, Oldham Athletic, and Stockport County, and more recent competitive Premier League rivalries with Tottenham Hotspur, Chelsea and Arsenal, and Champions League rivalries with Real Madrid.

== Ownership and finances ==
The holding company of Manchester City, Manchester City Limited, is a private limited company, with approximately 54 million shares in issue. The club has been in private hands since 2007, when the major shareholders agreed to sell their holdings to UK Sports Investments Limited (UKSIL), a company controlled by Thaksin Shinawatra. UKSIL then made a formal offer to buy the shares held by several thousands of small shareholders.

Prior to Thaksin's takeover, the club had been listed on the specialist independent equity market PLUS (formerly OFEX) since 1995. On 6 July 2007, after acquiring 75% of the shares, Thaksin de-listed the club and re-registered it as a private company. By August, UKSIL had obtained over 90% of the shares and invoked its rights under the Companies Act to "squeeze out" the remaining shareholders, securing full ownership of the club. Thaksin became chairman, while his children, Panthongtae and Pintongta, were appointed as directors. Former chairman John Wardle remained on the board for a year, but resigned in July 2008 following the appointment of Nike executive Garry Cook as executive chairman in May. The club made a pre-tax loss of £11m in the fiscal year ending 31 May 2007, the final year for which the club published accounts as a public company.

Thaksin's purchase prompted a period of transfer spending at the club, in total around £30 million, whereas over the several previous seasons Manchester City's net spending had been among the lowest in the Premier League. A year later, this investment was dwarfed by an influx of money derived from the club's takeover. On 1 September 2008, Abu Dhabi-based Abu Dhabi United Group Investment and Development Limited completed the takeover of Manchester City. The deal, worth a reported £200 million, was announced on the morning of 1 September. It sparked various transfer "deadline-day" rumours and bids such as the club's attempt to gazump Manchester United's protracted bid to sign Dimitar Berbatov from Tottenham Hotspur for a fee in excess of £30 million. Minutes before the transfer window closed, the club signed Robinho from Real Madrid for a British record transfer fee of £32.5 million. The wealth of the new owners meant that, in the summer of 2009, City were able to finance the purchase of experienced international players prior to the new season, spending more than any other club in the Premier League.

=== City Football Group ===
Created in the 2013–14 season to manage the global footballing interests of the Abu Dhabi United Group, City Football Group (CFG) is an umbrella corporation owning stakes in a network of global clubs for the purposes of resource sharing, academy networking and marketing.

==== CFG ownership ====
Clubs owned by CFG Listed in order of acquisition/foundation. Bold indicates the club was founded by CFG. * indicates the club was acquired by CFG. § indicates the club is co-owned. † indicates the club is no longer owned by CFG.
2008	(England) Manchester City*
2009–2012
2013	(United States) **New York City FC**^{§}
2014	(Australia) Melbourne City*
2014	(Japan) Yokohama F. Marinos*^{†}
2015–2016
2017	(Uruguay) Montevideo City*
2017	(Spain) Girona*^{§}
2018
2019	(China) Shenzhen Peng City*^{§}
2019	(India) Mumbai City^{†}
2020	(Belgium) Lommel*
2020	(France) Troyes*
2021
2022	(Italy) Palermo*^{§}
2023	(Brazil) Bahia*^{§}

In addition to Manchester City, City Football Group owns stakes in a number of clubs:

- (Australia) Melbourne City (2014–present)

On 23 January 2014, it was announced that Manchester City had partnered with the Australian rugby league franchise Melbourne Storm, purchasing a majority stake in A-League team Melbourne City. On 5 August 2015, CFG bought out the Storm and acquired full ownership of the team.

- (Japan) Yokohama F. Marinos (2014–2026)

On 20 May 2014, it was announced that Manchester City had partnered with the Japanese Automotive company Nissan to become a minority shareholder in Yokohama based J-League side, Yokohama F. Marinos. Nissan took ownership of all shares in June 2026, though the clubs remained partnered.

- (United States) New York City FC (2015–present)

On 21 May 2013, it was announced that Manchester City had partnered with the American baseball franchise the New York Yankees to introduce the 20th Major League Soccer expansion team, New York City FC as its majority shareholder. The club began play in the 2015 Major League Soccer season.

- (Uruguay) Montevideo City Torque (2017–present)

On 5 April 2017, CFG confirmed the purchase of Uruguayan second division team Montevideo City Torque.

- (Spain) Girona (2017–present)

On 23 August 2017, it was announced that CFG had acquired 44.3% of Segunda División (second tier) side Girona. Another 44.3% was held by the Girona Football Group, led by Pere Guardiola, brother of Manchester City manager Pep Guardiola.

- (China) Shenzhen Peng City (2019–present)

On 20 February 2019, it was announced that CFG as well as UBTECH and China Sports Capital had acquired Sichuan Jiuniu.

- (India) Mumbai City (2019–2025)

CFG was announced as majority stakeholder of Mumbai City on Thursday 28 November 2019 after acquiring 65% of the club. Mumbai City is the professional football club based in Mumbai, competing in the Indian Super League. CFG divested their shares in December 2025 due to uncertainty in Indian football.

- (Belgium) Lommel (2020–present)

CFG was announced as a majority stakeholder of Lommel on Monday 11 May 2020, acquiring the majority (unspecified) of the club's shares. Lommel is a professional football club based in Lommel, competing in the Belgian First Division B (second tier).

- (France) Troyes (2020–present)

On 3 September 2020, CFG announced that they had purchased the shares of Daniel Masoni, the former owner of Ligue 2 (second tier) club Troyes, making them the majority shareholder of the French club.

- (Italy) Palermo (2022–present)

On 4 July 2022, Italian Serie B (second tier) club Palermo announced that CFG had acquired an 80% majority stake in their ownership.

- (Brazil) Bahia (2023–present)

On 3 December 2022, CFG acquired 90% of Campeonato Brasileiro Série A club Bahia. The deal was finalised on 4 May 2023.

==== Partner clubs ====
- (Bolivia) Club Bolívar (2021–present)

On 12 January 2021, CFG announced Bolivian club Club Bolívar as its first partner club.

- (France) Vannes (2021–present)

On 18 February 2021, CFG announced that French Championnat National 2 (tier 4) club Vannes would be its second partner club.

== Stadium ==
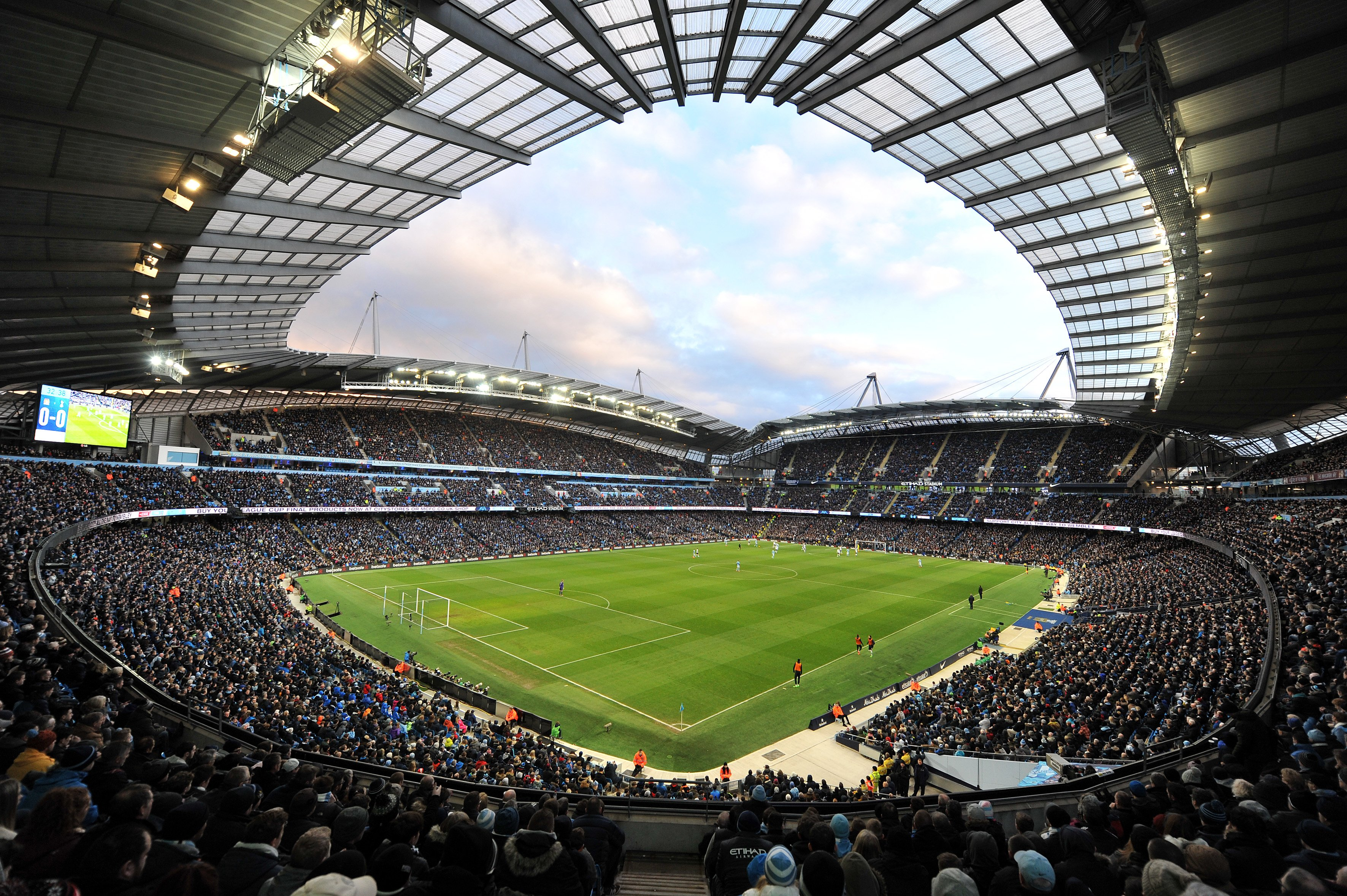
The City of Manchester Stadium – the home of Manchester City since 2003

The City of Manchester Stadium in east Manchester, known as the Etihad Stadium since 2011 for sponsorship reasons, is on a 200-year lease from Manchester City Council to Manchester City. It has been the club's home since the end of the 2002–03 season, when City moved from Maine Road. Before moving to the stadium, the club spent in excess of £30 million to convert it to football use: the pitch was lowered, adding another tier of seating around it, and a new North Stand was constructed. The inaugural match at the new stadium was a 2–1 win over Barcelona in a friendly match.

After playing home matches at five stadiums between 1880 and 1887, the club settled at Hyde Road Football Stadium, its home for 36 years. A fire destroyed the Main Stand in 1920, and the club moved to the 84,000 capacity Maine Road three years later. Maine Road, nicknamed the "Wembley of the North" by its designers, hosted the largest-ever crowd at an English club ground when 84,569 attended an FA Cup tie against Stoke City on 3 March 1934. Though Maine Road was redeveloped several times over its 80-year lifespan, by 1995 its capacity was restricted to 32,000, prompting the search for a new ground which culminated in the move to the City of Manchester Stadium in 2003; it was renamed the Etihad Stadium in 2011.

A 7,000-seat third tier on the South Stand was completed in time for the start of the 2015–16 football season, increasing the stadium's capacity to 55,097. In September 2024, Manchester City revealed plans to expand the North Stand, increasing the stadium's total capacity to over 61,000. The project also included the construction of a hotel, office space for club staff, and a new fan zone. The expanded stand opened for the final game of the 2025–26 season and was named in honour of departing manager Pep Guardiola.

== Honours ==
Based on trophy count, Manchester City are one of the most successful teams in England – their thirty-eight major domestic, European and worldwide honours rank them fourth on the list of most decorated clubs.

The club's first major trophy was the 1904 FA Cup, though they had previously won three regional Manchester Cups before that point. Their first top division league title came in the 1936–37 season, with the first Charity Shield won in the following August. City's first League Cup and European trophy both came at the end of the 1969–70 season, the two trophies also constituting the team's first double of any kind. In the 2018–19 season, City became the first team to claim all of the major English trophies available in a single season, winning not just the Premier League, FA Cup, and League Cup, but also the Community Shield.

The 1970 Cup Winners' Cup victory remained City's only European trophy until their triumph in the 2022–23 UEFA Champions League. They have reached the semi-finals of the Champions League four times overall, losing in 2016, then winning en route to their first-ever final in 2021, losing in 2022, and winning en route to their maiden European Cup title in 2023.

Manchester City jointly held the record for most second division titles with Leicester City, both clubs having won the league on seven occasions, before Leicester clinched their eighth title in 2023–24. Manchester City's first victory occurred in 1898–99 and the most recent came in 2001–02.

Type	Competition	Titles	Seasons
Domestic	First Division / Premier League (Level 1)	10	1936–37, 1967–68, 2011–12, 2013–14, 2017–18, 2018–19, 2020–21, 2021–22, 2022–23, 2023–24
Domestic	Second Division / First Division / Championship (Level 2)	7	1898–99, 1902–03, 1909–10, 1927–28, 1946–47, 1965–66, 2001–02
Domestic	FA Cup	8	1903–04, 1933–34, 1955–56, 1968–69, 2010–11, 2018–19, 2022–23, 2025–26
Domestic	Football League Cup / EFL Cup	9	1969–70, 1975–76, 2013–14, 2015–16, 2017–18, 2018–19, 2019–20, 2020–21, 2025–26
Domestic	FA Charity Shield / FA Community Shield	7	1937, 1968, 1972, 2012, 2018, 2019, 2024
Continental	UEFA Champions League	1	2022–23
Continental	European Cup Winners' Cup	1	1969–70
Continental	UEFA Super Cup	1	2023
Worldwide	FIFA Club World Cup	1	2023

=== Doubles and Trebles ===
- Doubles
  - League and FA Cup (2): 2018–19, 2022–23
  - League Cup and European Cup Winners' Cup (1): 1969–70
  - FA Cup and League Cup (1): 2025–26
- Domestic treble
  - League, FA Cup, and League Cup (1): 2018–19
- Continental treble
  - League, FA Cup, and UEFA Champions League (1): 2022–23

=== Four-peats ===
- Four-peats
  - Premier League: 2020–21, 2021–22, 2022–23, 2023–24 (Note: By winning the title in 2024, City effectively made it a four-peat.)
  - EFL Cup: 2017–18, 2018–19, 2019–20, 2020–21 (Note: By winning the title in 2021, City effectively made it a four-peat.)

== Club records ==
- Record league victory – 11–3 vs Lincoln City (23 March 1895, most goals scored); 10–0 vs Darwen (18 February 1899, widest margin of victory)
- Record FA Cup victory – 12–0 vs Liverpool Stanley (4 October 1890)
- Record European victory – 7–0 vs Schalke 04, UEFA Champions League round of 16 second leg (12 March 2019); 7–0 vs RB Leipzig UEFA Champions League round of 16 second leg (14 March 2023)
- Record league defeat – 0–8 vs Burton Wanderers (26 December 1894); 0–8 vs Wolverhampton Wanderers (23 December 1933); 1–9 vs Everton (3 September 1906); 2–10 vs Small Heath (17 March 1893)
- Record FA Cup defeat – 0–6 vs Preston North End (30 January 1897); 2–8 vs Bradford Park Avenue (30 January 1946)
- Record European defeat – 0–4 vs Barcelona, UEFA Champions League group stage (19 October 2016)
- Highest home attendance – 84,569 vs Stoke City, FA Cup sixth round (3 March 1934) (Note: Remains the record home attendance in English football.)
- Most league appearances – 561 + 3 sub, Alan Oakes, 1958–76
- Most European / worldwide appearances – 75 + 16 sub, Bernardo Silva, 2017–26
- Most appearances overall – 676 + 4 sub, Alan Oakes, 1958–76
- Most goals scored overall – 260, Sergio Agüero, 2011–21
- Most goals scored in a season – 52, Erling Haaland, 2022–23
- Record transfer fee paid – £125 million to Chelsea for Enzo Fernández, September 2026
- Record transfer fee received – £85 million from Tottenham Hotspur for Savinho, August 2026 (Note: Fee widely reported as £75.0 million initially with up to £10.0 million with add-ons)

== See also ==
- List of Manchester City F.C. seasons
- Manchester City F.C. in international football
- List of world champion football clubs

== Bibliography ==
- Buckley, Andy; Burgess, Richard (2000). Blue Moon Rising: The Fall and Rise of Manchester City. Bury: Milo. ISBN 0-9530847-4-4.
- Gardner, Peter (1970). The Manchester City Football Book No. 2. London: Stanley Paul. ISBN 0-09-103280-6.
- Inglis, Simon (1987). The Football Grounds of Great Britain (2nd ed.). London: Collins Willow. ISBN 0-00-218249-1.
- James, Gary (2002). Manchester: The Greatest City. Polar Publishing. ISBN 1-899538-09-7.
- James, Gary (2005). The Official Manchester City Hall of Fame. Hamlyn. ISBN 0-600-61282-1.
- James, Gary (2006). Manchester City – The Complete Record. Derby: Breedon. ISBN 1-85983-512-0.
- James, Gary (2008). Manchester – A Football History. Halifax: James Ward. ISBN 978-0-9558127-0-5.
- Penney, Ian (2008). Manchester City: The Mercer-Allison Years. Derby: Breedon. ISBN 978-1-85983-608-8.
- Rowlands, Alan (2005). Trautmann: The Biography. Derby: Breedon. ISBN 1-85983-491-4.
- Tossell, David (2008). Big Mal: The High Life and Hard Times of Malcolm Allison, Football Legend. Edinburgh: Mainstream. ISBN 978-1-84596-478-8.
- Wallace, David (2007). Century City – Manchester City Football Club 1957/58. Leigh: King of the Kippax. ISBN 978-0-9557056-0-1.
- Ward, Andrew (1984). The Manchester City Story. Derby: Breedon. ISBN 0-907969-05-4.
