= Connected Scarf =

Proposed football technology

Connected Scarf is a proposed football technology.

== History ==
The Connected Scarf is a collaboration between English Premier League side Manchester City and American technology conglomerate Cisco. Technology and production agency Unit9 also contributed to the product. The scarf is proposed to be released in 2023.

== Technology ==
The scarf contains a sensor that tracks physiological and emotional data of the wearer.
