= 2019 EFL Cup final =

- Match programme cover, featuring Chelsea’s Eden Hazard and Manchester City’s Raheem Sterling
- Event: 2018–19 EFL Cup
| Chelsea | Manchester City |
| 0 | 0 |
- After extra time Manchester City won 4–3 on penalties
- Date: 24 February 2019
- Venue: Wembley Stadium, London
- Man of the Match: Bernardo Silva (Manchester City)
- Referee: Jon Moss (West Yorkshire)
- Attendance: 81,775

The 2019 EFL Cup final was an association football match that took place on 24 February 2019 at Wembley Stadium in London, England, to determine the winners of the 2018–19 EFL Cup. It was contested by Chelsea and holders Manchester City, who retained their title with a 4–3 victory on penalties following a 0–0 draw after extra time; it was the first time Manchester City had successfully defended a title. As winners, they would have entered the second qualifying round of the 2019–20 UEFA Europa League, but instead qualified directly for the 2019–20 UEFA Champions League by finishing first in the 2018–19 Premier League. The final was also a rematch of that season's FA Community Shield which Manchester City won 2–0.

== Route to the final ==
=== Chelsea ===
| Round | Opposition | Score |
|---|---|---|
| 3 | Liverpool (A) | 2–1 |
| 4 | Derby County (H) | 3–2 |
| QF | Bournemouth (H) | 1–0 |
| SF | Tottenham Hotspur (A) | 0–1 |
| SF | Tottenham Hotspur (H) | 2–1 (4–2 p) |
Key: (H) = Home; (A) = Away

Chelsea's participation in the 2018–19 UEFA Europa League meant they entered the EFL Cup in the third round, where they were drawn away to fellow Premier League side Liverpool. After going behind, goals from Emerson Palmieri and Eden Hazard gave Chelsea a 2–1 win. In the next round, they were drawn at home to Championship side Derby County. This time, Chelsea took an early lead via a Fikayo Tomori own goal, but Jack Marriott equalised for Derby four minutes later. Another own goal, this time by Richard Keogh, put Chelsea ahead again in the 21st minute, only for Martyn Waghorn to level the scores six minutes later. Four minutes before half-time, Cesc Fàbregas scored what turned out to be the winning goal, as the second half went goalless.

In the fifth round, Chelsea were drawn at home to Premier League side Bournemouth, with Hazard again proving the difference between the two sides in a 1–0 win. The semi-finals saw Chelsea drawn against London rivals Tottenham Hotspur. A Harry Kane penalty gave Tottenham a slim lead at Wembley Stadium in the first leg, but N'Golo Kanté levelled the aggregate scores after 27 minutes of the second leg. Hazard then put Chelsea in front with his third goal of the tournament in the 38th minute, only for Fernando Llorente to equalise again five minutes after half-time. The remainder of the match produced no further goals, and since the away goals rule was not in effect, the match went straight to a penalty shoot-out. Both sides converted their first two kicks each, before Eric Dier put his effort over the bar, allowing Jorginho to give Chelsea the lead. Kepa Arrizabalaga then saved from Lucas Moura, before David Luiz scored to send Chelsea to the final.

=== Manchester City ===
| Round | Opposition | Score |
|---|---|---|
| 3 | Oxford United (A) | 3–0 |
| 4 | Fulham (H) | 2–0 |
| QF | Leicester City (A) | 1–1 (3–1p) |
| SF | Burton Albion (H) | 9–0 |
| SF | Burton Albion (A) | 1–0 |
Key: (H) = Home; (A) = Away

Manchester City had qualified for the 2018–19 UEFA Champions League, and thus also entered the EFL Cup in the third round, drawn away to League One side Oxford United. At the Kassam Stadium, Manchester City won 3–0 with goals from Gabriel Jesus, Riyad Mahrez and Phil Foden. In the fourth round, they were drawn with fellow Premier League club Fulham at home. At their City of Manchester Stadium, Manchester City won 2–0 via two goals from Brahim Díaz. In the next round, they were drawn away at fellow Premier League side Leicester City. The match finished 1–1 at the King Power Stadium, with Marc Albrighton's 73rd-minute goal – the only one Manchester City conceded en route to the final – cancelling out Kevin De Bruyne's early strike, but Manchester City won the resulting penalty shoot-out 3–1 and progressed.

In the two legged semi-final, Manchester City drew League One side Burton Albion. Manchester City won the first leg at the City of Manchester Stadium 9–0 in their biggest win for 31 years, with four goals from Jesus and one each from Kevin De Bruyne, Oleksandr Zinchenko, Foden, Kyle Walker and Mahrez. In the second leg at the Pirelli Stadium, Sergio Agüero scored his first goal of the competition to give Manchester City a 1–0 win (10–0 on aggregate) and confirm their place in the final.

== Pre-match ==
Manchester City boss Pep Guardiola was thinking of playing second choice goalkeeper Arijanet Muric instead of Ederson as Muric had played for the duration of City's route to the final and conceded just once. He left Muric sweating about his place by insisting that he would make a lot call on whether to play him or not.

== Match ==
=== Summary ===
The match was overshadowed by an incident near the end of extra time, with the score at 0–0 and a penalty shoot-out looming, that saw Chelsea goalkeeper Kepa Arrizabalaga defy manager Maurizio Sarri and refuse to be substituted for Willy Caballero (whose penalty saves won former club Manchester City the 2016 Football League Cup final). Arrizabalaga ultimately stayed on the pitch, while an irate Sarri nearly stormed into the match tunnel, and was later held back by Chelsea player Antonio Rüdiger from confronting Arrizabalaga.

The shoot-out, taken at the Chelsea fans' end, saw Chelsea starting: Jorginho's low, weak shot was saved by City goalkeeper Ederson, while İlkay Gündoğan sent Arrizabalaga the wrong way to put City 1–0 up. Chelsea's César Azpilicueta blasted into the top corner to level at 1–1, while Sergio Agüero's weak effort was let in under Arrizabalaga to put City ahead 2–1. Emerson's shot was too powerful and deflected into goal off Ederson for 2–2, and the scoreline remained as City's Leroy Sané had his penalty saved by Arrizabalaga. David Luiz failed to score for Chelsea when he hit the post, then Bernardo Silva's effort down the middle made it 3–2 for City. Chelsea's Eden Hazard scored with the Panenka technique for 3–3, but City's Raheem Sterling scored a high shot to win the shoot-out 4–3 and crown City as champions.

After the game, both Arrizabalaga and Sarri said that the situation was a misunderstanding with Sarri believing that Arrizabalaga was too injured with a cramp to continue, but Arrizabalaga felt well enough to do so.

=== Details ===
24 February 2019
16:30 GMT

| Chelsea | 0–0 (a.e.t.) | Manchester City |
|---|---|---|
| | Report |
Penalties
| Jorginho (penalty missed); Azpilicueta (penalty scored); Emerson (penalty scored); David Luiz (penalty missed); Hazard (penalty scored) | 3–4 | (penalty scored) Gündoğan; (penalty scored) Agüero; (penalty missed) Sané; (penalty scored) B. Silva; (penalty scored) Sterling |

Wembley Stadium, London
Attendance: 81,775
Referee: Jon Moss (West Yorkshire)

| Chelsea | Manchester City |

| GK | 1 | (Spain) Kepa Arrizabalaga |
| RB | 28 | (Spain) César Azpilicueta (c) |
| CB | 2 | (Germany) Antonio Rüdiger | (yellow card) 72' |
| CB | 30 | (Brazil) David Luiz | (yellow card) 30' |
| LB | 33 | (Italy) Emerson |
| CM | 7 | (France) N'Golo Kanté |
| CM | 5 | (Italy) Jorginho | (yellow card) 88' |
| CM | 8 | (England) Ross Barkley | | (substituted off) 89' |
| RF | 22 | (Brazil) Willian | | (substituted off) 95' |
| CF | 10 | (Belgium) Eden Hazard |
| LF | 11 | (Spain) Pedro | | (substituted off) 79' |
Substitutes:
| GK | 13 | (Argentina) Willy Caballero |
| DF | 27 | (Denmark) Andreas Christensen |
| MF | 12 | (England) Ruben Loftus-Cheek | | (substituted on) 89' |
| MF | 17 | (Croatia) Mateo Kovačić |
| MF | 20 | (England) Callum Hudson-Odoi | | (substituted on) 79' |
| FW | 9 | (Argentina) Gonzalo Higuaín | | (substituted on) 95' |
| FW | 18 | (France) Olivier Giroud |
Manager:
(Italy) Maurizio Sarri

| GK | 31 | (Brazil) Ederson |
| RB | 2 | (England) Kyle Walker |
| CB | 30 | (Argentina) Nicolás Otamendi | (yellow card) 90+1' |
| CB | 14 | (France) Aymeric Laporte | | (substituted off) 46' |
| LB | 35 | (Ukraine) Oleksandr Zinchenko |
| CM | 17 | (Belgium) Kevin De Bruyne | | (substituted off) 86' |
| CM | 25 | (Brazil) Fernandinho | (yellow card) 58' | (substituted off) 91' |
| CM | 21 | (Spain) David Silva (c) | | (substituted off) 79' |
| RF | 20 | (Portugal) Bernardo Silva |
| CF | 10 | (Argentina) Sergio Agüero |
| LF | 7 | (England) Raheem Sterling |
Substitutes:
| GK | 49 | (Kosovo) Arijanet Muric |
| DF | 3 | (Brazil) Danilo | | (substituted on) 91' |
| DF | 4 | (Belgium) Vincent Kompany | | (substituted on) 46' |
| MF | 8 | (Germany) İlkay Gündoğan | | (substituted on) 79' |
| MF | 19 | (Germany) Leroy Sané | | (substituted on) 86' |
| MF | 26 | (Algeria) Riyad Mahrez |
| MF | 47 | (England) Phil Foden |
Manager:
(Spain) Pep Guardiola

Man of the Match:
Bernardo Silva (Manchester City)

Assistant referees:
Andy Halliday (Army)
Marc Perry (West Midlands)
Fourth official:
Paul Tierney (Lancashire)
Reserve assistant referee:
Constantine Hatzidakis (Kent)
Video assistant referee:
Martin Atkinson (West Yorkshire)
Assistant video assistant referee:
Steve Child (London)

Match rules

- 90 minutes
- 30 minutes of extra time if necessary
- Penalty shoot-out if scores still level
- Seven named substitutes
- Maximum of three substitutions, with a fourth allowed in extra time

== See also ==
- 2019 FA Cup final
