= 1960–61 Birmingham City F.C. season =

Birmingham City F.C.
1960–61 season
- Chairman: Harry Morris Jr
- Manager: Gil Merrick
- Ground: St Andrew's
- Football League First Division: 19th
- FA Cup: Fifth round (eliminated by Leicester City)
- Football League Cup: Third round (eliminated by Plymouth Argyle)
- Inter-Cities Fairs Cup: Final
- Top goalscorer: League: Mike Hellawell, Jimmy Harris (10 goals); All: Jimmy Harris (17 goals)
- Highest home attendance: 41,656 vs Leicester City, FA Cup 5th round, 18 February 1961
- Lowest home attendance: 15,015 vs Burnley, 27 April 1961
- Average home league attendance: 25,751
Home colours

The 1960–61 Football League season was Birmingham City Football Club's 58th in the Football League and their 34th in the First Division. They finished in 19th position in the 22-team division for the second consecutive season. They entered the 1960–61 FA Cup in the third round proper and lost to Leicester City in the fifth round after a replay, and entered the inaugural season of the Football League Cup in the second round, losing to Plymouth Argyle in the third, again after a replay. In the Inter-Cities Fairs Cup, Birmingham beat Inter Milan both at home and away in the semi-final to reach their second consecutive final, but the competition schedule meant that the match itself was played in September and October 1962, well into the 1961–62 playing season.

Manager Gil Merrick, appointed to succeed Pat Beasley at the end of the 1959–60 season, brought in former Spanish international winger Emilio Aldecoa – the first Spaniard to play in the Football League – as coach. Twenty-four players made at least one appearance in nationally organised first-team competition, and there were twelve different goalscorers. Full back Brian Farmer played in 54 of the 55 first-team matches over the season, and Jimmy Harris finished as leading goalscorer with 17 goals in all competitions; in the league, Harris and Mike Hellawell were joint top scorers, each with 10 goals.

== Football League First Division ==
Date	League position	Opponents	Venue	Result	Score F–A	Scorers	Attendance
20 August 1960	8th	Bolton Wanderers	A	D	2–2	Gordon, Hooper	20,543
24 August 1960	7th	West Bromwich Albion	A	W	2–1	Rudd, Hooper	32,102
27 August 1960	9th	Sheffield Wednesday	H	D	1–1	Hooper	27,197
31 August 1960	4th	West Bromwich Albion	H	W	3–1	Gordon, Astall, Williams og	37,811
3 September 1960	8th	Fulham	A	L	1–2	Rudd	19,292
6 September 1960	11th	Arsenal	A	L	0–2		20,065
10 September 1960	14th	Preston North End	H	L	1–3	Gordon	24,435
14 September 1960	10th	Arsenal	H	W	2–0	Stubbs 2	22,905
17 September 1960	11th	Burnley	A	L	1–2	Cummings og	20,749
24 September 1960	10th	Nottingham Forest	H	W	3–1	Gordon, Singer, Astall	26,659
1 October 1960	11th	Manchester City	A	L	1–2	Singer	27,665
8 October 1960	14th	West Ham United	A	L	3–4	Rudd, Hellawell 2	15,954
15 October 1960	11th	Chelsea	H	W	1–0	Hellawell	23,334
22 October 1960	13th	Aston Villa	A	L	2–6	Hellawell, Thomson og	44,722
29 October 1960	14th	Wolverhampton Wanderers	H	L	1–2	Showell og	32,284
5 November 1960	15th	Blackburn Rovers	A	L	0–2		13,463
12 November 1960	14th	Manchester United	H	W	3–1	Gordon, Taylor, Neal	31,564
19 November 1960	14th	Tottenham Hotspur	A	L	0–6		46,010
26 November 1960	16th	Leicester City	H	L	0–2		25,828
3 December 1960	14th	Blackpool	A	W	2–1	Hellawell 2	11,720
10 December 1960	17th	Everton	H	L	2–4	Neal, Stubbs	27,717
17 December 1960	17th	Bolton Wanderers	H	D	2–2	Harris 2	19,051
24 December 1960	18th	Newcastle United	A	D	2–2	Hellawell, Neal	20,354
26 December 1960	17th	Newcastle United	H	W	2–1	Bloomfield, Hellawell	29,437
31 December 1960	17th	Sheffield Wednesday	A	L	0–2		22,993
14 January 1961	14th	Fulham	H	W	1–0	Singer	23,265
21 January 1961	13th	Preston North End	A	W	3–2	Bloomfield, Hellawell, Singer	7,667
11 February 1961	17th	Nottingham Forest	A	L	0–1		23,541
25 February 1961	14th	West Ham United	H	W	4–2	Harris 2 (1 pen), Bloomfield, Neal	16,856
4 March 1961	17th	Chelsea	A	L	2–3	Gordon, Astall	27,727
11 March 1961	17th	Aston Villa	H	D	1–1	Singer	41,656
18 March 1961	18th	Wolverhampton Wanderers	A	L	1–5	Singer	23,835
22 March 1961	14th	Manchester City	H	W	3–2	Harris pen, Bloomfield 2	18,092
25 March 1961	15th	Blackburn Rovers	H	D	1–1	Hellawell	19,301
31 March 1961	13th	Cardiff City	A	W	2–0	Harris pen, Orritt	16,339
1 April 1961	16th	Everton	A	L	0–1		31,872
3 April 1961	13th	Cardiff City	H	W	2–1	Harris, Orritt	20,065
8 April 1961	14th	Tottenham Hotspur	H	L	2–3	Harris 2 (1 pen)	40,961
15 April 1961	16th	Manchester United	A	L	1–4	Foulkes og	28,376
22 April 1961	18th	Blackpool	H	L	0–2		17,834
27 April 1961	18th	Burnley	H	L	0–1		15,015
29 April 1961	19th	Leicester City	A	L	2–3	Harris, Singer	19,920

=== League table (part) ===
Final First Division table (part)
Pos	Club	Pld	W	D	L	F	A	GA	Pts
17th	Fulham	42	14	8	20	72	95	0.76	36
18th	Bolton Wanderers	42	12	11	19	58	73	0.80	35
19th	Birmingham City	42	14	6	22	62	84	0.74	34
20th	Blackpool	42	12	9	21	68	73	0.93	33
21st	Newcastle United	42	11	10	21	86	109	0.79	32
Key	Pos = League position; Pld = Matches played; W = Matches won; D = Matches drawn; L = Matches lost; F = Goals for; A = Goals against; GA = Goal average; Pts = Points								
Source									

== FA Cup ==
Round	Date	Opponents	Venue	Result	Score F–A	Scorers	Attendance
Third round	7 January 1961	Nottingham Forest	A	W	2–0	Singer 12', 84'	19,919
Fourth round	28 January 1961	Rotherham United	H	W	4–0	Singer 2, Neal, Harris	31,931
Fifth round	18 February 1961	Leicester City	H	D	1–1	Harris pen	53,589
Fifth round replay	22 February 1961	Leicester City	A	L	1–2	Harris	41,916

== League Cup ==
Round	Date	Opponents	Venue	Result	Score F–A	Scorers	Attendance
Second round	31 October 1960	Bradford Park Avenue	A	W	1–0	Hellawell	4,736
Third round	14 November 1960	Plymouth Argyle	H	D	0–0		15,313
Third round replay	16 November 1960	Plymouth Argyle	A	L	1–3	Wyatt og	14,132

== Inter-Cities Fairs Cup ==
In the semi-final, Birmingham beat Inter Milan both at home and away; no other English club was to beat them in a competitive match in the San Siro until Arsenal did so in the Champions League more than 40 years later. Birmingham reached the final for the second consecutive season, having lost to Barcelona in 1960. The 1961 final was scheduled for late September and mid-October 1961, well into the 1961–62 playing season, by which time the first round of the 1961–62 competition would already be under way.

Round	Date	Opponents	Venue	Result	Score F–A	Scorers	Attendance
First round 1st leg	19 October 1960	Újpesti Dózsa	H	W	3–2	Gordon 2, Astall	23,381
First round 2nd leg	26 October 1960	Újpesti Dózsa	A	W	2–1	Rudd, Singer	25,000
Second round 1st leg	23 November 1960	KB Copenhagen	A	D	4–4	Gordon 2, Singer 2	2,500
Second round 2nd leg	7 December 1960	KB Copenhagen	H	W	5–0	Stubbs 2, Harris, Bloomfield, Hellawell	22,486
Semi-final 1st leg	19 April 1961	Inter Milan	A	W	2–1	Harris, Balleri og	20,000
Semi-final 2nd leg	3 May 1961	Inter Milan	H	W	2–1	Harris 2	29,530

== Appearances and goals ==
Players marked † left the club during the playing season.
Key to positions: GK – Goalkeeper; FB – Full back; HB – Half back; FW – Forward

Players' appearances and goals by competition
Pos.	Nat.	Name	League		FA Cup		League Cup		Fairs Cup		Total	
Pos.	Nat.	Name	Apps	Goals	Apps	Goals	Apps	Goals	Apps	Goals	Apps	Goals
GK	ENG	Johnny Schofield	18	0	0	0	1	0	3	0	22	0
GK	ENG	Colin Withers	24	0	4	0	2	0	3	0	33	0
FB	ENG	George Allen	38 (Note: General source mistakenly includes Allen rather than Sissons in the team for the match against Blackburn in March.)	0	3	0	3	0	6	0	51	0
FB	ENG	Brian Farmer	41	0	4	0	3	0	6	0	54	0
HB	ENG	Malcolm Beard	3	0	0	0	1	0	0	0	4	0
HB	ENG	Winston Foster	2	0	0	0	0	0	0	0	2	0
HB	WAL	Terry Hennessey	10	0	0	0	0	0	2	0	12	0
HB	ENG	Dick Neal	39	4	4	1	3	0	6	0	52	5
HB	ENG	Graham Sissons	14	0	1	0	1	0	1	0	16	0
HB	ENG	Trevor Smith	31	0	4	0	2	0	5	0	42	0
HB	ENG	Johnny Watts	29	0	4	0	3	0	4	0	40	0
FW	ENG	Gordon Astall	17	3	2	0	1	0	1	1	21	4
FW	SCO	Bertie Auld	0	0	0	0	0	0	1	0	1	0
FW	ENG	Ray Barlow	5	0	0	0	1	0	1	0	7	0
FW	ENG	Jimmy Bloomfield	25	5	4	0	1	0	4	1	34	6
FW	ENG	Johnny Gordon †	24	6	0	0	2	0	3	4	29	10
FW	ENG	Jimmy Harris	20	10	4	3	0	0	3	4	27	17
FW	ENG	Mike Hellawell	28	10	3	0	3	1	6	1	40	12
FW	ENG	Harry Hooper †	10	3	0	0	0	0	0	0	10	3
FW	WAL	Bryan Orritt	12	2	0	0	2	0	2	0	16	2
FW	ENG	Billy Rudd	18	3	0	0	0	0	2	1	20	4
FW	ENG	Jimmy Singer	18	7	4	4	1	0	3	3	26	14
FW	ENG	Robin Stubbs	12	3	0	0	1	0	2	2	15	5
FW	ENG	Brian Taylor	17	1	3	0	2	0	2	0	24	1
FW	ENG	Don Weston †	7	0	0	0	0	0	0	0	7	0

== See also ==
- Birmingham City F.C. seasons
