= 1961–62 Birmingham City F.C. season =

Birmingham City F.C.
1961–62 season
- Chairman: Harry Morris Jr
- Manager: Gil Merrick
- Ground: St Andrew's
- Football League First Division: 17th
- FA Cup: Third round (eliminated by Tottenham Hotspur)
- Football League Cup: First round (eliminated by Swindon Town)
- 1960–61 Inter-Cities Fairs Cup: Final (eliminated by AS Roma)
- 1961–62 Inter-Cities Fairs Cup: Second round (eliminated by Espanyol)
- Top goalscorer: League: Ken Leek (18); All: Jimmy Harris, Ken Leek (20)
- Highest home attendance: 46,096 vs Tottenham Hotspur, FA Cup 3rd round, 6 January 1962
- Lowest home attendance: 11,596 vs Swindon Town, League Cup 1st round, 13 September 1961
- Average home league attendance: 25,751
Home colours

The 1961–62 Football League season was Birmingham City Football Club's 59th in the Football League and their 35th in the First Division. They finished in 17th position in the 22-team division. They entered the 1961–62 FA Cup in the third round proper and lost in that round to Tottenham Hotspur after a replay, and entered the League Cup at the first round, again losing their opening match after a replay, this time against Swindon Town. Birmingham lost in the final of the 1960–61 Inter-Cities Fairs Cup in October 1961, and only a few weeks later, were eliminated from the 1961–62 competition in the second round by Espanyol. This was Birmingham's last appearance in major European competition for nearly 50 years.

Twenty-five players made at least one appearance in nationally organised first-team competition, and there were eleven different goalscorers. Forward Mike Hellawell played in all 50 first-team matches over the season (half back Malcolm Beard missed only one), and Ken Leek and Jimmy Harris finished as joint leading goalscorers with 20 goals in all competitions; Leek was top scorer in league competition with 18 goals.

== Football League First Division ==
Date	League position	Opponents	Venue	Result	Score F–A	Scorers	Attendance
19 August 1961	4th	Fulham	H	W	2–1	Harris, Bloomfield	25,387
22 August 1961	8th	Nottingham Forest	A	L	1–2	Harris	19,486
26 August 1961	17th	Sheffield Wednesday	A	L	1–5	Bloomfield	29,931
30 August 1961	19th	Nottingham Forest	H	D	1–1	Harris	21,095
2 September 1961	21st	Leicester City	H	L	1–5	Bloomfield	21,977
6 September 1961	20th	West Bromwich Albion	A	D	0–0		20,541
9 September 1961	21st	Ipswich Town	A	L	1–4	Singer	20,017
16 September 1961	22nd	Burnley	H	L	2–6	Bloomfield, Hellawell	18,764
20 September 1961	22nd	West Bromwich Albion	H	L	1–2	Hellawell	23,931
23 September 1961	22nd	Arsenal	A	D	1–1	Harris pen	31,749
30 September 1961	22nd	Bolton Wanderers	H	W	2–1	Bloomfield, Auld	17,214
7 October 1961	22nd	Wolverhampton Wanderers	H	L	3–6	Harris 2 (1 pen), Bloomfield	29,159
14 October 1961	21st	Manchester United	A	W	2–0	Orritt, Hellawell	30,674
21 October 1961	21st	Chelsea	H	W	3–2	Harris, Bloomfield 2	20,095
28 October 1961	19th	Aston Villa	A	W	3–1	Harris 2, Orritt	49,532
4 November 1961	17th	Blackpool	H	D	1–1	Orritt	21,450
11 November 1961	21st	Blackburn Rovers	A	L	0–2		12,083
18 November 1961	19th	West Ham United	H	W	4–0	Harris pen, Bloomfield, Orritt, Auld	20,682
25 November 1961	20th	Sheffield United	A	L	1–3	Harris	16,838
2 December 1961	15th	Cardiff City	H	W	3–0	Leek 2, Hellawell	20,959
9 December 1961	19th	Tottenham Hotspur	A	L	1–3	Leek	32,509
16 December 1961	16th	Fulham	A	W	1–0	Leek	12,730
23 December 1961	12th	Sheffield Wednesday	H	D	1–1	Leek	19,109
26 December 1961	13th	Manchester City	H	D	1–1	Leek	21,926
13 January 1962	11th	Leicester City	A	W	2–1	Harris, Auld	22,691
20 January 1962	10th	Ipswich Town	H	W	3–1	Leek 2, Baker og	26,968
3 February 1962	11th	Burnley	A	L	1–7	Auld	24,047
10 February 1962	10th	Arsenal	H	W	1–0	Harris	27,797
17 February 1962	11th	Bolton Wanderers	A	L	2–3	Leek, Auld	13,308
24 February 1962	14th	Wolverhampton Wanderers	A	L	1–2	Leek	29,665
3 March 1962	13th	Manchester United	H	D	1–1	Leek	25,817
9 March 1962	13th	Chelsea	A	D	1–1	Leek	23,959
17 March 1962	16th	Aston Villa	H	L	0–2		43,489
24 March 1962	18th	Blackpool	A	L	0–1		11,854
30 March 1962	16th	Blackburn Rovers	H	W	2–1	Leek, Hellawell	17,431
6 April 1962	14th	West Ham United	A	D	2–2	Bloomfield, Leek	22,668
11 April 1962	14th	Manchester City	A	W	4–1	Harris, Bloomfield, Leek, Hellawell	21,941
14 April 1962	14th	Sheffield United	H	W	3–0	Harris 2 (1 pen), Hellawell	19,514
20 April 1962	14th	Everton	A	L	1–4	Leek	47,506
21 April 1962	17th	Cardiff City	A	L	2–3	Leek 2	8,608
24 April 1962	17th	Everton	H	D	0–0		21,910
28 April 1962	17th	Tottenham Hotspur	H	L	2–3	Leek, Beard	29,614

=== League table (part) ===
Final First Division table (part)
Pos	Club	Pld	W	D	L	F	A	GA	Pts
15th	Manchester United	42	15	9	18	72	75	0.96	39
16th	Blackburn Rovers	42	14	11	17	50	58	0.86	39
17th	Birmingham City	42	14	10	18	65	81	0.80	38
18th	Wolverhampton Wanderers	42	13	10	19	73	86	0.85	36
19th	Nottingham Forest	42	13	10	19	63	79	0.80	36
Key	Pos = League position; Pld = Matches played; W = Matches won; D = Matches drawn; L = Matches lost; F = Goals for; A = Goals against; GA = Goal average; Pts = Points								
Source									

== FA Cup ==
Round	Date	Opponents	Venue	Result	Score F–A	Scorers	Attendance
Third round	6 January 1962	Tottenham Hotspur	H	D	3–3	Harris 2, Leek	46,096
Third round replay	10 January 1962	Tottenham Hotspur	A	L	2–4	Harris, Leek	62,917

== League Cup ==
Round	Date	Opponents	Venue	Result	Score F–A	Scorers	Attendance
First round	13 September 1961	Swindon Town	H	D	1–1	Neal	11,596
First round replay	25 September 1961	Swindon Town	A	L	0–2		13,063

== 1960–61 Inter-Cities Fairs Cup ==
The final of the 1960–61 Inter-Cities Fairs Cup took place in late September and mid-October 1961, when the first round of the 1961–62 competition was already under way. In the semi-final, Birmingham had beaten Inter Milan home and away; no other English club beat them in a competitive match in the San Siro until Arsenal did so in the Champions League more than 40 years later. Birmingham played in the final for the second consecutive season, having lost to Barcelona in 1960. In the first leg, missed chances and poor defending allowed Roma to take a two-goal lead at St Andrew's, but second-half goals from Mike Hellawell and Bryan Orritt, whose late equaliser came after Jimmy Harris's shot rebounded from the crossbar, took Birmingham into the second leg on level terms. In front of a large crowd in the Stadio Olimpico, Roma won 2–0 to take the trophy 4–2 on aggregate.

Round	Date	Opponents	Venue	Result	Score F–A	Scorers	Attendance
Final 1st leg	27 September 1961	AS Roma	H	D	2–2	Hellawell, Orritt	21,005
Final 2nd leg	11 October 1961	AS Roma	A	L	0–2		50,000

== 1961–62 Inter-Cities Fairs Cup ==
As finalists in the previous season's competition, Birmingham were awarded a bye to the second round, in which they were drawn against Espanyol. They lost heavily in the first leg, in Barcelona, where Antonio Camps scored a hat-trick. They won the ill-tempered return leg 1–0 with a goal from Bertie Auld, but four players, including Birmingham's Jimmy Harris and Auld himself, were sent off.

Round	Date	Opponents	Venue	Result	Score F–A	Scorers	Attendance
Second round 1st leg	15 November 1961	Espanyol	A	L	2–5	Bloomfield, Harris pen	60,000
Second round 2nd leg	7 December 1961	Espanyol	H	W	1–0	Auld	16,874

== Appearances and goals ==
Players marked † left the club during the playing season.
Key to positions: GK – Goalkeeper; FB – Full back; HB – Half back; FW – Forward

Players' appearances and goals by competition
Pos.	Nat.	Name	League		FA Cup		League Cup		1960–61 Fairs Cup		1961–62 Fairs Cup		Total	
Pos.	Nat.	Name	Apps	Goals	Apps	Goals	Apps	Goals	Apps	Goals	Apps	Goals	Apps	Goals
GK	ENG	Johnny Schofield	35	0	2	0	2	0	2	0	2	0	43	0
GK	ENG	Colin Withers	7	0	0	0	0	0	0	0	0	0	7	0
FB	ENG	George Allen †	5	0	0	0	1	0	0	0	0	0	6	0
FB	ENG	Brian Farmer †	7 (Note: General source mistakenly attributes Foster's appearance against Everton in April 1962 to Farmer, who had left the club three months earlier.)	0	0	0	2	0	2	0	0	0	11	0
FB	ENG	Winston Foster	16	0	0	0	0	0	1	0	0	0	17	0
FB	ENG	Stan Lynn	21	1	2	0	0	0	0	0	2	0	25	1
FB	ENG	Graham Sissons	33	0	2	0	1	0	2	0	2	0	40	0
FB	ENG	Pat Wright	2	0	0	0	0	0	0	0	0	0	2	0
HB	ENG	Malcolm Beard	42	1	2	0	2	0	2	0	2	0	50	1
HB	WAL	Terry Hennessey	34	0	2	0	1	0	2	0	2	0	41	0
HB	ENG	Dick Neal †	6	0	0	0	1	1	0	0	0	0	7	1
HB	ENG	Trevor Smith	39	0	2	0	2	0	1	0	2	0	46	0
HB	ENG	Johnny Watts	5	0	0	0	0	0	0	0	0	0	5	0
FW	SCO	Bertie Auld	38	5	2	0	0	0	1	0	2	1	43	6
FW	ENG	Jimmy Bloomfield	35	11	0	0	2	0	2	0	1	1	40	12
FW	ENG	Peter Bullock	1	0	0	0	0	0	0	0	0	0	1	0
FW	ENG	Jimmy Harris	39	16	2	3	1	0	2	0	2	1	46	20
FW	ENG	Mike Hellawell	42	7	2	0	2	0	2	1	2	0	50	8
FW	WAL	Ken Leek	24	18	2	2	0	0	0	0	1	0	27	20
FW	WAL	Bryan Orritt	17	4	2	0	1	0	2	1	2	0	24	5
FW	ENG	Billy Rudd †	2	0	0	0	0	0	0	0	0	0	2	0
FW	ENG	Jimmy Singer	2	1	0	0	1	0	1	0	0	0	4	1
FW	ENG	Robin Stubbs	7	0	0	0	1	0	0	0	0	0	8	0
FW	ENG	Brian Taylor †	3	0	0	0	1	0	0	0	0	0	4	0
FW	ENG	Denis Thwaites	0	0	0	0	1	0	0	0	0	0	1	0

== See also ==
- Birmingham City F.C. seasons
