= List of Birmingham City F.C. players =

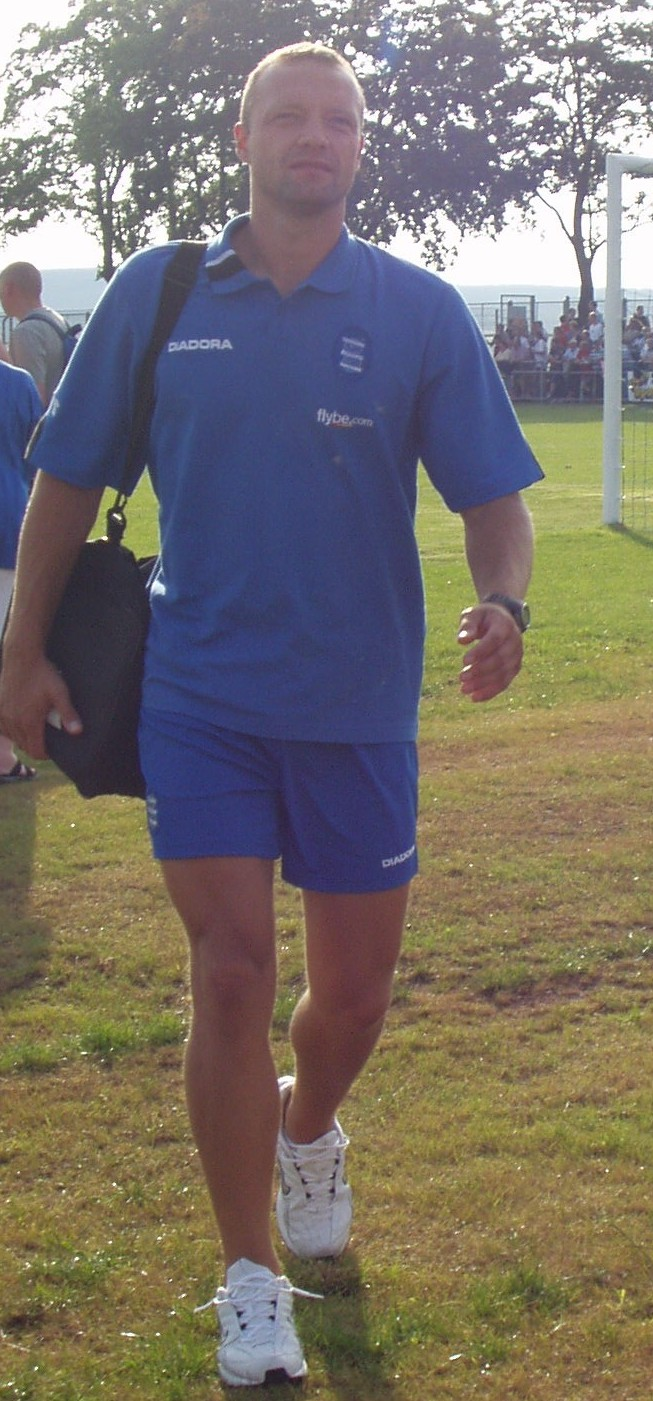
Maik Taylor, the club's most capped international player

Birmingham City Football Club, an English association football club based in the city of Birmingham, was founded in 1875 under the name of Small Heath Alliance. They first entered the FA Cup in the 1881–82 season. When nationally organised league football in England began, the club, by then called simply Small Heath F.C., was a founder member of the Football Alliance, formed the year after the Football League. In 1892, the Football League decided to form a Second Division, inviting the members of the Football Alliance to join; as one of the less successful members, Small Heath was placed in the Second Division. Since that time the club's first team has competed in numerous nationally and internationally organised competitions, and all players who have played in 100 or more such matches are listed below.

Each player's details include the duration of his Birmingham career, his typical playing position while with the club, and the number of games played and goals scored in domestic league matches and in all senior competitive matches. Where applicable, the list also includes the national team for which the player was selected, and the number of senior international caps he won.

== Introduction ==
As of the date specified below, more than 200 men had made 100 or more appearances in senior competitive matches for Birmingham. Frank Womack holds the club record for league appearances, having played 491 matches between 1908 and 1928, closely followed by Gil Merrick with 485 between 1946 and 1959. If all senior competitions are included, Merrick has 551, followed by Womack's 515 which is the record for an outfield player. The goalscoring record is held by Joe Bradford, with 249 league goals, and 267 in total, scored between 1920 and 1935. No other player comes close: Trevor Francis is the nearest with 119 league goals, 133 in total, scored between 1970 and 1979. Bradford holds the record for league goals scored in a top-flight season with 29 in the 1927–28 First Division. A club record for transfer fee received was set when Ché Adams joined Southampton in 2019; officially undisclosed, it was reported as £15 million. Forty years earlier, Trevor Francis became the first player transferred between British clubs for a £1 million fee, and in 1896, future England international forward Fred Wheldon joined league champions Aston Villa for terms reportedly "higher than have ever been concluded": a fee of £350 plus the proceeds of a friendly match between the clubs. Caesar Jenkyns was the first man capped by his country while a Birmingham (then Small Heath) player when he represented Wales against Ireland in February 1892. The player with most senior international caps while at the club is Maik Taylor with 58 for Northern Ireland, and Harry Hibbs has most for England, with 25.

Bob McRoberts, Billy Beer, George Liddell, Merrick, Garry Pendrey, Francis and Gary Rowett all went on to manage the team. Others took part in significant matches in club history. Billy Ollis, Jenkyns, Ted Devey, Jack Hallam, Wheldon and Tommy Hands appeared in Small Heath's first Football League match in 1892. Eight men listed were part of Birmingham's pioneering venture into club football in Europe in the 1955–58 Inter-Cities Fairs Cup, (Note: The eight team members were Gil Merrick, Jack Badham, Ken Green, Johnny Watts, Noel Kinsey, Eddy Brown, Peter Murphy and Alex Govan. Birmingham City became the first English club team to take part in European competition when they played their first group game in the 1955–58 Inter-Cities Fairs Cup on 16 May 1956, a goalless draw away at Internazionale. The competition lasted over three English seasons with the final not played until 1958. The London XI, a representative side made up of players from several London clubs, were the first English team when they played their first group game in 1955.) and ten played on the losing side in the 1956 FA Cup final (Note: The ten were Merrick, Jeff Hall, Green, Trevor Smith, Len Boyd, Gordon Astall, Kinsey, Boyd, Murphy and Govan.) (an eleventh, Roy Warhurst, missed the match through injury). In more recent times, Paul Tait scored the first golden goal to decide a Wembley cup final, against Carlisle United in the 1995 Football League Trophy. Geoff Horsfield scored the extra-time equaliser that took the 2002 First Division play-off final into a shootout; Paul Devlin and Stan Lazaridis converted their spot-kicks as Birmingham were promoted to the Premier League for the first time. Seven men listed here, including captain Stephen Carr and goalscorer Nikola Žigić, took the field as Birmingham won the 2011 League Cup; another two were unused substitutes. (Note: The seven who took the field were Stephen Carr, Liam Ridgewell, Sebastian Larsson, Craig Gardner, Keith Fahey, Nikola Žigić and Cameron Jerome; the two unused were Maik Taylor and David Murphy.) Just three years later, the first headed goal of full-back Paul Caddis's career, 93 minutes into the final match of the season, saved the team from relegation to the third tier of English football.

== Key ==
- The list is ordered first by number of appearances in total, then by number of League appearances, and then if necessary by date of debut.
- Appearances as a substitute are included.
- Statistics are correct up to and including the match played on 3 May 2025, the last match of the 2024–25 regular season. Where a player left the club permanently after this date, his statistics are updated to his date of leaving.

Player
Players marked * were registered for the club as at the date specified above.
Players with name in italics and marked † were on loan from another club for the duration of their Birmingham career. The loaning club is noted in the Notes column.
Players marked ‡ have been inducted into the Birmingham City F.C. Hall of Fame.
Players marked $ have won the Birmingham City F.C. Player of the Year award. (Note: To 2002: "Player of the Year". The Birmingham City FC Archive. 13 December 2002. Archived from the original on 28 December 2004.; 1974: "Birmingham City Player of the Year – Kenny Burns". Getty Images. 2 December 2015. Archived from the original on 29 October 2019.; 1995: Ridley, Ian (11 February 1996). "Still crazy after all these years". The Independent. Archived from the original on 29 October 2019.; 2004: "Mikael is the fans' choice". Birmingham Evening Mail. 6 May 2007. p. 87 – via Gale OneFile: News.; 2006: "Johnson collects Blues awards". Birmingham Post. 4 May 2006. Archived from the original on 29 October 2019 – via business-live.co.uk.; 2007: "Clem gains the plaudits". Birmingham City F.C. 2 May 2007. Archived from the original on 9 August 2011.; 2008: Tattum, Colin (13 May 2008). "Sebastian Larsson scoops six awards". Birmingham Mail. Archived from the original on 29 October 2019.; 2012: Tattum, Colin (1 May 2012). "Chris Burke cleans up at annual awards dinner at the ICC in Birmingham". Birmingham Mail. Archived from the original on 20 April 2013.; 2013: Tattum, Colin (5 May 2013). "Curtis Davies named Birmingham City Player of the Season". Birmingham Mail. Archived from the original on 12 November 2019.; 2014: "Robbo's double delight at #PA14". Birmingham City F.C. 6 May 2014. Archived from the original on 6 May 2014.; 2015: "Donaldson completes hat-trick at the Players Awards 2015". Birmingham City F.C. 3 May 2015. Archived from the original on 1 September 2017.; 2017: Ireland, Shane (1 May 2017). "Birmingham City's player awards: Who won what?". Birmingham Mail. Archived from the original on 29 October 2019.; 2018: "Jacques Maghoma bagged a brace at the Awards Evening!". Birmingham City F.C. 8 May 2018. Archived from the original on 7 April 2023.; 2019: "Che Adams sweeps the board at Player Awards evening". Birmingham City F.C. 7 May 2019. Archived from the original on 7 April 2023.; 2020: "It's a double for Juke". Birmingham City F.C. 29 July 2020. Archived from the original on 11 February 2021.; 2021: "2020/21 Player Awards". Birmingham City F.C. 13 May 2021. Archived from the original on 7 April 2023.)

Positions key
Pre-1960s		1960s–	
GK	Goalkeeper		
FB	Full back	DF	Defender
HB	Half back	MF	Midfielder
FW	Forward		
U	Utility player		

Position
Playing positions are listed according to the tactical formations that were employed at the time. Thus the change in the names of defensive and midfield positions reflects the tactical evolution that occurred from the 1960s onwards. (Note: Playing position sourced to Matthews (2010), pp. 120–199 until the 2009–10 season, and thereafter to "Birmingham City". Soccerbase. Centurycomm. Archived from the original on 26 May 2007.)
Club career
Club career is defined as the first and last calendar years in which the player appeared for the club in any of the competitions listed below.
League appearances and League goals
League appearances and goals comprise those in the Football Alliance, the Football League and the Premier League. Appearances in the 1939–40 Football League season, abandoned after three games because of the Second World War, are excluded.
Total appearances and Total goals
Total appearances and goals comprise those in the Football Alliance, Football League (including test matches and play-offs), Premier League, FA Cup, League Cup, UEFA Europa League, Associate Members' Cup/Football League Trophy, Inter-Cities Fairs Cup, Anglo-Italian Cup, Texaco Cup, Anglo-Scottish Cup and Full Members' Cup. Matches in wartime competitions are excluded.
International selection
Countries are listed only for players who have been selected for international football. Only the highest level of international competition is given, except where a player competed for more than one country, in which case the highest level reached for each country is shown.
Caps
For players having played at full international level, the caps column counts the number of such appearances during his career with the club.

== Players with 100 or more appearances ==
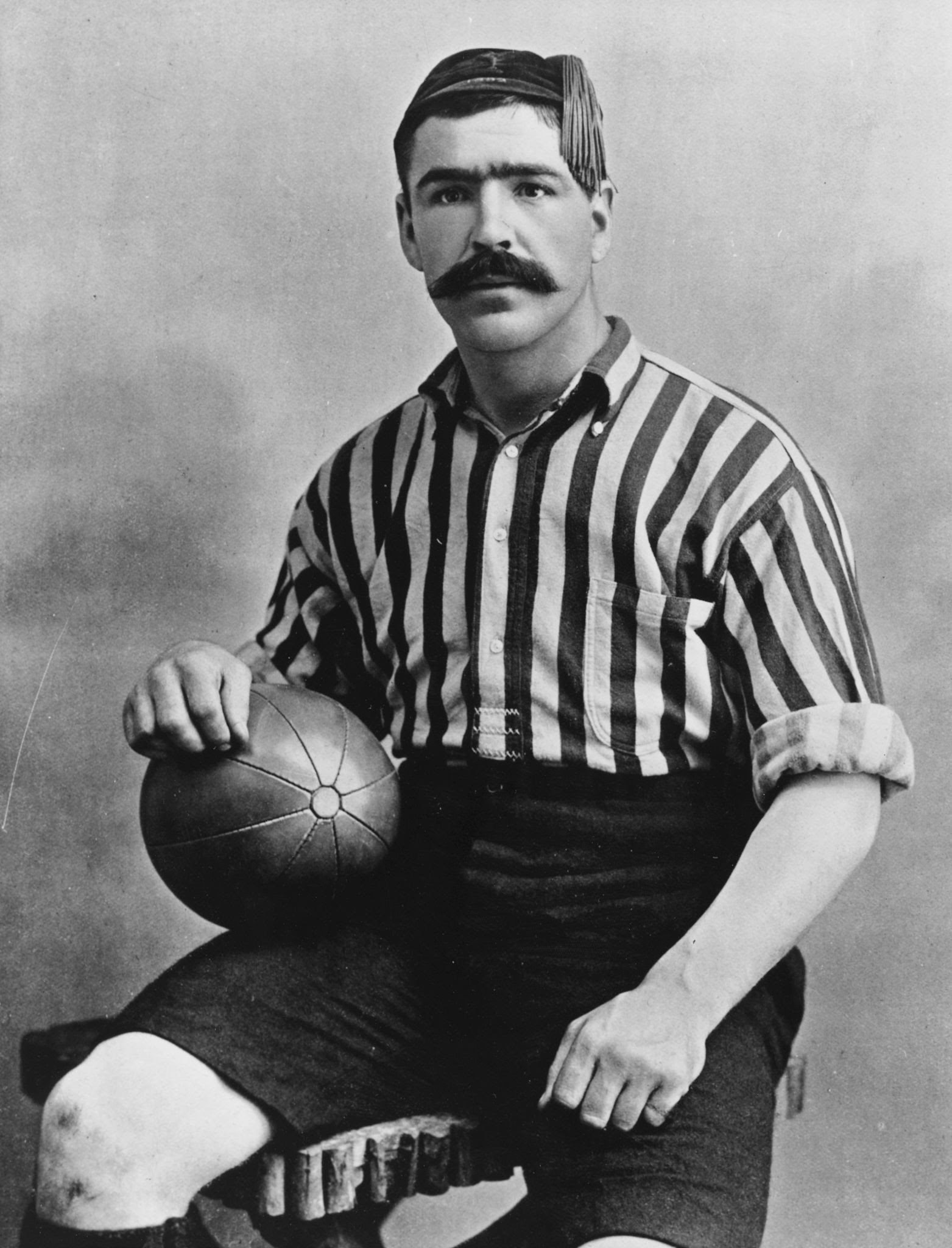
Caesar Jenkyns, captain in the 1890s, was the first player capped by his country while a Small Heath player.

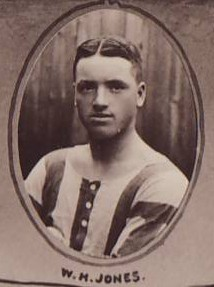
Billy Jones scored 102 goals from 253 games before the First World War.

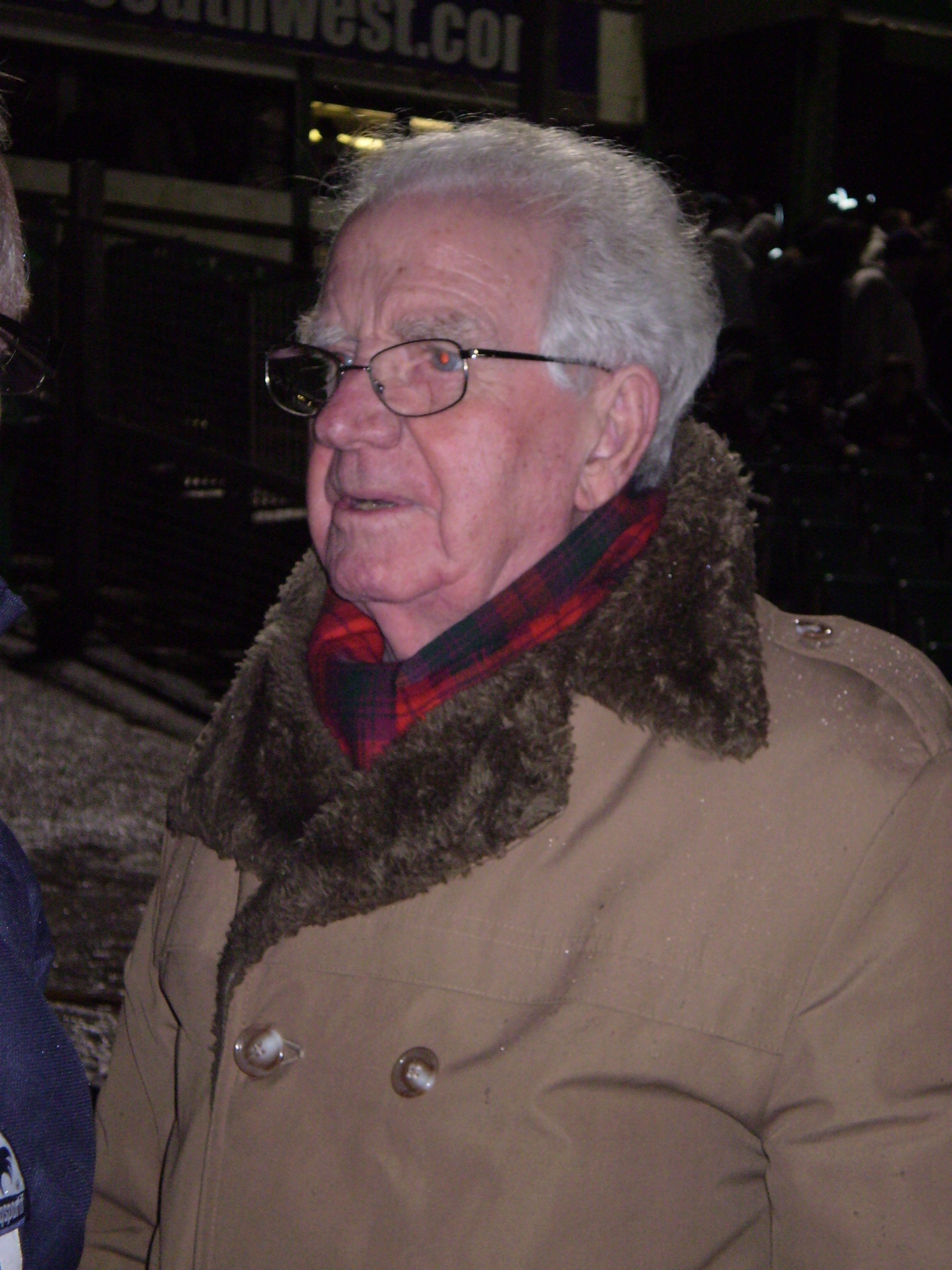
1956 FA Cup Finalist Alex Govan was responsible for Harry Lauder's song "Keep right on to the end of the road" becoming the Birmingham City fans' anthem.

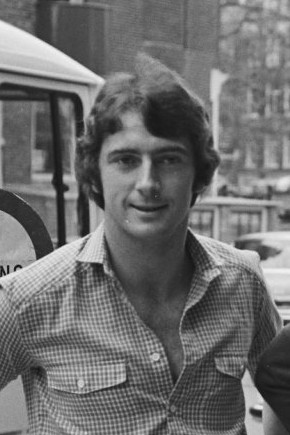
Trevor Francis, who joined Birmingham as a 15-year-old, became the first British footballer transferred for £1 million when Brian Clough signed him for league champions Nottingham Forest in February 1979.

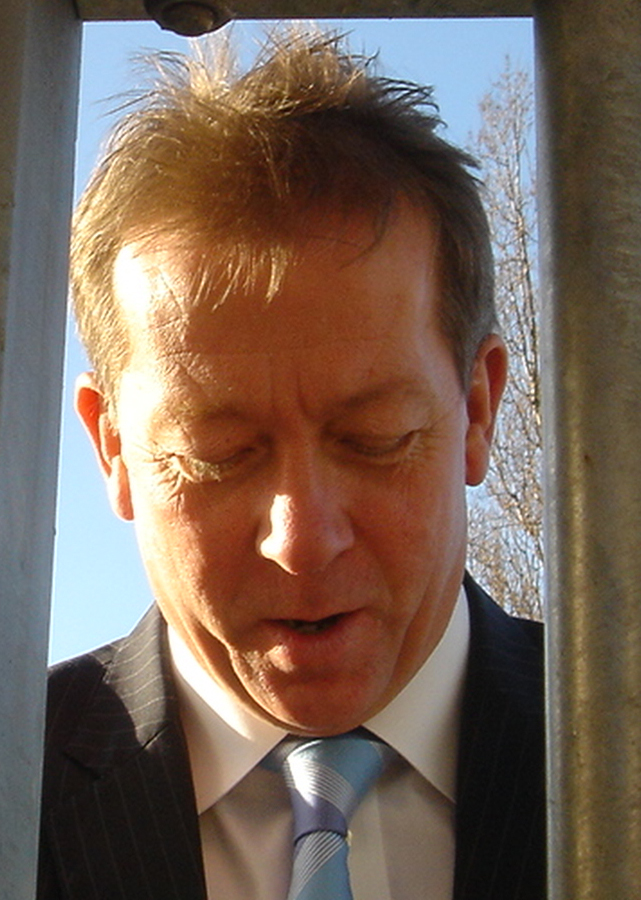
After Alan Curbishley was transferred from Birmingham to local rivals Aston Villa in 1983, it was 36 years before another player made the same move.

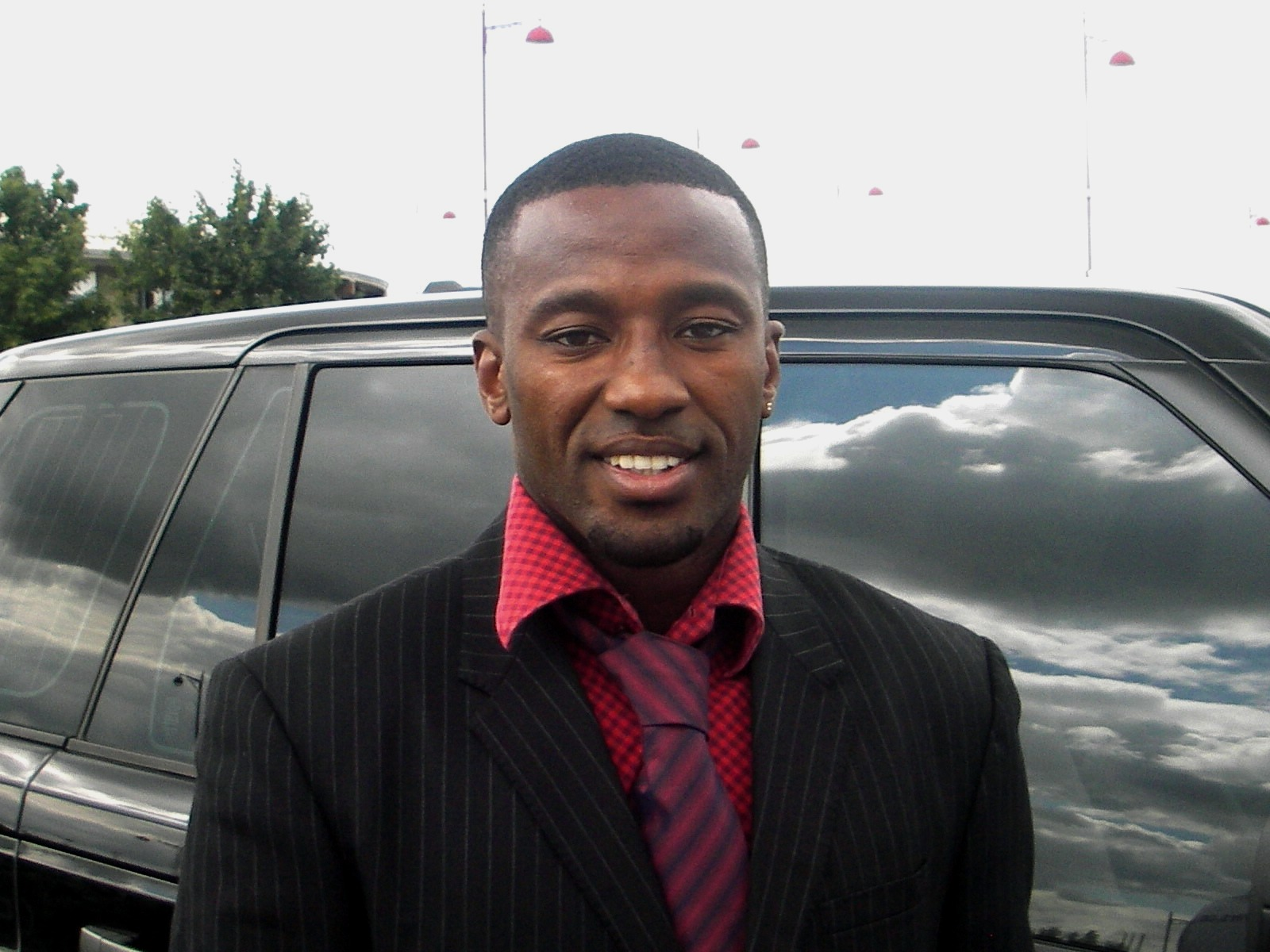
Jamaica international Michael Johnson played more than 300 times for Birmingham in an eight-year career.

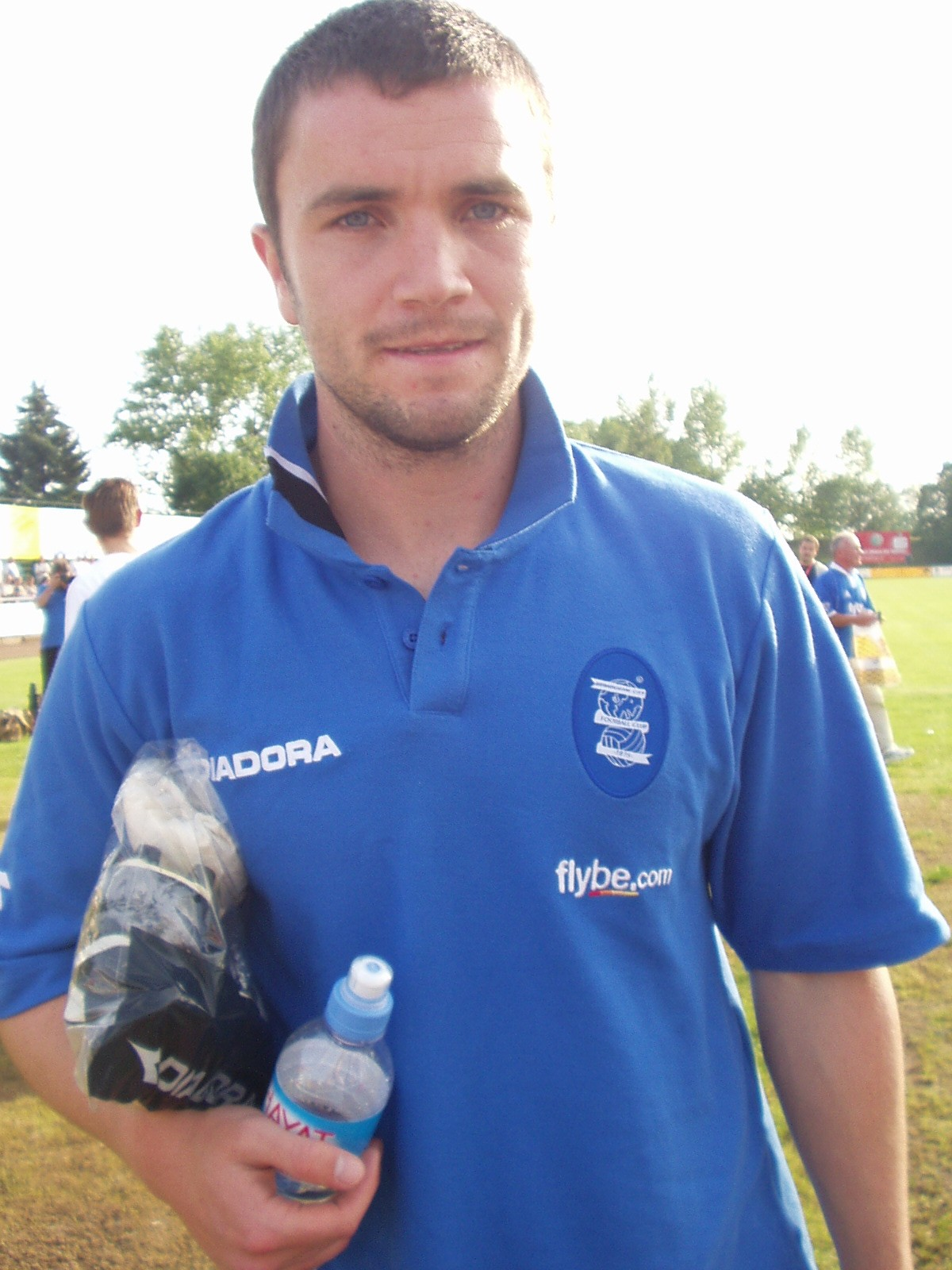
Damien Johnson, captain from 2006 to 2009, won Birmingham's Player of the Season award in 2006.

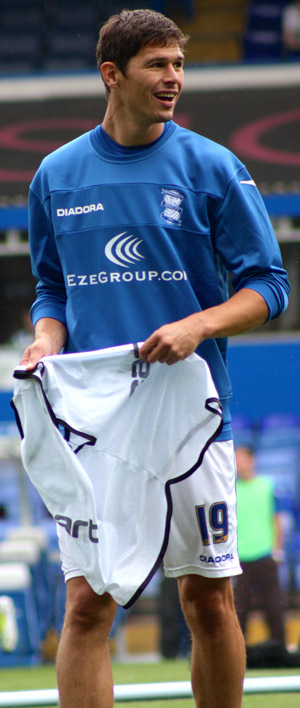
Nikola Žigić scored Birmingham's opening goal in the 2011 Football League Cup Final.

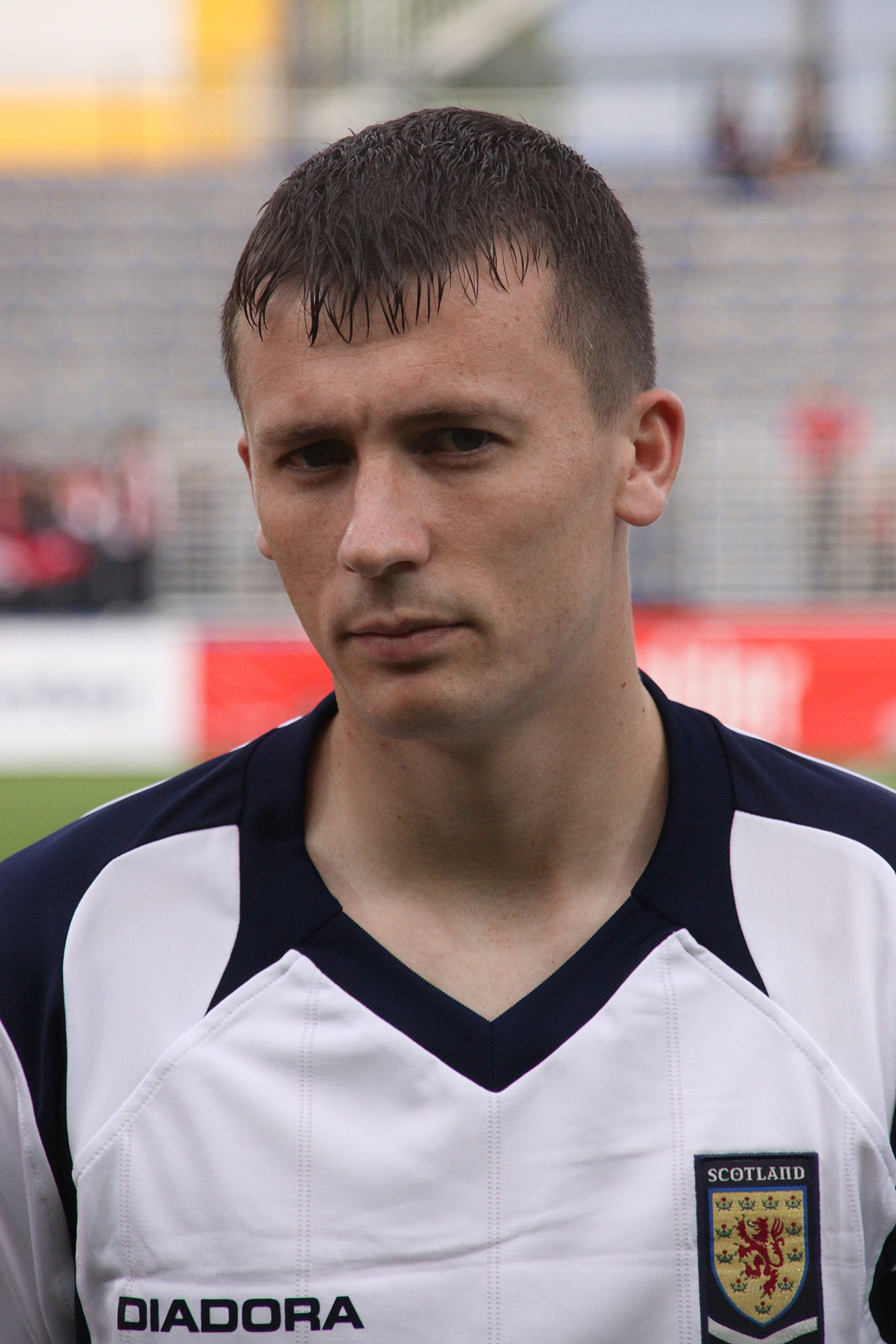
Paul Caddis scored the 93rd-minute goal on the last day of the 2013–14 season that saved Birmingham from relegation to League One.

Table of players, including playing position, club statistics and international selection
Player	Pos	Club career	League (Note: Appearances and goals for players whose Birmingham careers ended before the 2010–11 season are sourced to Matthews (2010), pp. 234–455, 466–483. Because of proofreading errors, appearances in the 1992–93 Anglo-Italian Cup are sourced to Matthews (1995), p. 244. Later players are sourced individually.)		Total		International selection (Note: Unless sourced individually, international selection and caps are sourced to Matthews (2010), pp. 498–503 or via the alphabetical list at worldfootball.net.)	Caps	Notes	Refs
Player	Pos	Club career	Apps	Goals	Apps	Goals	International selection	Caps	Notes	Refs
Gil Merrick ‡	GK	1946–1959	485	0	551	0	England	23	(Note: Player who later managed the club.)	
Frank Womack	FB	1908–1928	491	0	515	0	England trial	—		
Joe Bradford ‡	FW	1920–1935	414	249	445	267	England	12		
Ken Green	FB	1947–1958	401	3	440	3	England B	—	(Note: Green was a member of England's squad for the 1954 World Cup but did not take the field.)	
Johnny Crosbie	FW	1920–1932	409	71	432	72	Scotland	1		
Trevor Smith	DF	1953–1964	365	3	430	3	England	2		
Malcolm Beard	MF	1960–1970	350	28	404	34	England youth	—		
Dan Tremelling	GK	1919–1931	382	0	395	0	England	1		
Malcolm Page ‡	DF / MF	1965–1980	336	9	392	10	Wales	28		
Harry Hibbs	GK	1926–1939	358	0	388	0	England	25	(Note: Player statistics exclude three games played in the aborted 1939–40 Football League season.)	
Ray Martin $	DF	1964–1975	334	1	378	1	—	—		
Garry Pendrey ‡	DF	1969–1979	306	4	360	5	—	—		
Lukas Jutkiewicz *$	FW	2016–2025	330	64	358	69	—	—	(Note: Burnley)	
Walter Wigmore	FW / HB	1899–1912	329	23	355	25	—	—		
Ian Bennett	GK	1993–2004	287	0	354	0	—	—		
Percy Barton	HB	1914–1928	331	13	349	14	England	7		
George Liddell	FB / HB	1920–1932	323	6	345	6	—	—		
Joe Gallagher ‡	DF	1973–1981	286	17	337	23	England B	—		
John Frain $	DF / MF	1986–1996	274	23	336	26	—	—	(Note: Matthews omits Frain from the starting eleven for the 30 January 1996 Anglo-Italian Cup match against West Bromwich Albion.)	
Trevor Francis ‡$	FW	1970–1979	280	119	329	133	England	12		
George Briggs	FW	1924–1933	298	98	324	107	—	—		
Michael Johnson $	DF	1995–2003	262	13	314	18	Jamaica	12		
Fred Harris	FW / HB	1934–1950	280	61	310	69	—	—		
Nat Robinson	GK	1899–1908	283	0	306	0	England trial	—		
Cyril Trigg	FW / FB	1936–1954	268	67	291	72	—	—		
Bryan Hughes	MF	1997–2004	248	34	291	42	—	—		
Jimmy Cringan	HB	1923–1934	260	12	284	12	—	—		
Ned Barkas	FB	1928–1937	256	9	284	9	—	—		
Len Boyd	HB	1949–1956	255	14	281	15	England B	—		
Peter Murphy	FW	1952–1960	244	107	277	127	—	—		
Gordon Astall	FW	1953–1961	235	60	271	67	England	2		
George Morrall	HB	1927–1936	243	5	266	7	—	—		
Martin Grainger ‡$	DF	1997–2004	226	25	266	28	—	—		
Jeff Hall ‡	FB	1951–1959	227	1	265	1	England	17		
Maxime Colin	DF	2017–2023	241	7	253	7	France U20	—		
Geoff Vowden	FW	1964–1970	221	79	253	94	—	—		
Billy Jones	FW	1901–1909; 1912–1913	236	99	251	102	England trial	—		
Billy Beer	HB	1902–1909	236	34	250	35	—	—		
Johnny Watts	HB	1952–1963	206	3	248	3	—	—		
Lewis Stoker	HB	1930–1938	230	2	246	2	England	3		
Maik Taylor	GK	2003–2011	214	0	242	0	Northern Ireland	58	(Note: Fulham)	
Dave Latchford $	GK	1969–1978	206	0	240	0	—	—		
Roy Warhurst	HB	1950–1957	213	10	239	10	—	—		
Jack Jones	FB	1920–1927	228	1	237	1	England trial	—		
Johnny Schofield	GK	1952–1965	212	0	237	0	—	—	(Note: Matthews attributes Colin Withers' 23 November 1960 Inter-Cities Fairs Cup appearance against KB to Johnny Schofield, who had fractured his skull some days before.)	
Billy Walton	FW / HB	1889–1902	201	56	232	70	—	—		
Trevor Hockey $	MF	1965–1971	196	8	231	13	Wales	0		
Martin O'Connor	MF	1996–2002	187	16	223	19	Cayman Islands	2		
Stan Lazaridis	MF	1999–2006	191	8	222	8	Australia	33		
Alex Leake	HB	1895–1902	199	21	221	23	England	0		
Jackie Stewart	FW	1948–1954	203	51	218	54	—	—		
Colin Green	DF	1962–1970	183	1	217	1	Wales	15		
Bob Hatton ‡	FW	1971–1976	175	58	217	73	—	—		
Damien Johnson $	MF	2002–2010	193	4	216	4	Northern Ireland	42		
Dennis Jennings	U	1936–1950	192	12	214	14	—	—		
Frank Stokes	FB	1903–1910	199	1	213	1	England trial	—		
Brian Roberts $	DF	1984–1990	187	0	213	0	—	—		
Vince Overson	DF	1986–1991	182	3	213	4	England youth	—		
Mike Hellawell	FW	1957–1964	178	30	213	33	England	2	(Note: Matthews attributes Greg Farrell's appearance against Everton on 4 October 1963 to Hellawell, who was unavailable due to influenza.)	
Jim Herriot	GK	1965–1970	181	0	212	0	Scotland	8		
Paul Tait	MF	1988–1997	170	14	212	18	—	—		
Kevin Dillon	MF	1977–1983	186	15	211	19	England U21	—		
Alan Campbell	MF	1970–1975	175	11	209	14	Scotland U23	—		
Roger Hynd ‡$	DF	1970–1975	171	4	207	5	—	—		
Sebastian Larsson $	MF	2006–2011	184	19	205	25	Sweden	31	(Note: Arsenal)	
Robert Hopkins ‡	FW / MF	1983–1986; 1989–1991	173	29	205	34	—	—		
Kenny Burns ‡$	DF / FW	1971–1977	170	45	205	53	Scotland	8		
Gordon Taylor	FW	1970–1975	166	9	204	11	—	—		
Trevor Matthewson	DF	1989–1993	168	12	203	13	—	—		
Cameron Jerome	FW	2006–2011	181	37	202	42	England U21	—		
Terry Hennessey	MF	1961–1965	178	3	202	3	Wales	16		
Harlee Dean $	DF	2017–2023	191	8	200	9	—	—		
Darren Purse $	DF	1998–2004	168	9	200	11	England U21	—		
Alec McClure	HB	1912–1923	192	4	198	4	—	—		
Benny Green	FW	1903–1908	185	44	198	47	—	—		
Marc Roberts	DF	2017–2024	186	7	197	7	England C	—		
Dick Neal	HB	1957–1961	165	15	197	18	England U23	—		
Des Bremner	MF	1984–1989	168	5	196	5	Scotland	0		
David Davis $	MF	2014–2020	182	10	194	11	—	—		
Johnny Vincent	MF	1964–1970	171	41	193	44	England youth	—		
Bob Latchford ‡	FW	1969–1974	160	68	193	84	England	0		
Jack Badham	FB / HB	1948–1956	175	4	190	4	—	—		
Tom Fillingham	HB	1930–1938	183	8	189	9	—	—		
Bob McRoberts	FW	1898–1905	173	70	187	82	—	—	(Note: Matthews attributes Harry Wilcox's 18 February 1899 appearance against New Brighton Tower to McRoberts, who had broken a collarbone the previous week.) (Note: Reliable sources differ widely on the scorers in Small Heath's 10–1 win at home to Blackpool on 2 March 1901. This article uses the English National Football Archive (ENFA)'s version – McMillan 5, Aston 2, Archer, McRoberts, and Wharton – as likely the result of more recent research.)	
Alex Govan ‡	FW	1953–1958	166	53	187	60	—	—		
Simon Sturridge	FW	1988–1993	150	30	186	38	—	—		
Eddy Brown	FW	1954–1958	158	74	185	90	—	—		
Gary Gardner	MF	2018–2024	171	15	184	15	England U21	—	(Note: Aston Villa)	
Maikel Kieftenbeld	MF	2015–2021	170	5	184	6	Netherlands U21	—		
Michael Morrison	DF	2014–2019	174	14	183	15	England C	—	(Note: Charlton Athletic)	
Ernie Curtis	FW	1928–1933	165	45	182	54	Wales	2		
Jacques Maghoma $	MF	2015–2020	168	20	180	21	DR Congo	24		
Jonathan Spector	DF	2011–2017	153	0	179	1	United States	5		
Martin Thomas	GK	1988–1993	144	0	176	0	Wales	0		
Nigel Gleghorn	MF	1989–1992	142	33	176	43	—	—		
Paul Robinson $	DF	2012–2018	158	3	175	4	England U21	—		
Fred Wheldon	FW	1890–1896	155	96	175	113	England	0		
Liam Ridgewell	DF	2007–2012	152	9	175	11	England U21	—		
Noel Kinsey	FW	1953–1958	149	48	174	55	Wales	3	(Note: Matthews omits Kinsey's 3 December 1956 Inter-Cities Fairs Cup substitute appearance against the Zagreb XI.)	
Kevan Broadhurst ‡	DF / MF	1977–1984	153	10	173	10	—	—		
Ivan Šunjić	MF	2019–2024	160	7	173	7	Croatia; Bosnia and Herzegovina	0; 0		
Ian Clarkson	DF	1988–1993	136	0	171	0	—	—		
Jonathan Grounds	DF	2014–2018	158	4	170	5	—	—		
Arthur Archer	FB	1897–1902	154	4	170	4	—	—		
Winston Foster	DF	1961–1968	153	2	170	2	—	—	(Note: Matthews attributes Winston Foster's 20 April 1962 appearance against Everton to Brian Farmer, who had left the club. He also attributes Brian Sharples' 18 September 1965 appearance against Portsmouth to the injured Foster. Foster's totals are correct, albeit coincidentally, while Farmer should have one fewer league appearance than listed by Matthews.)	
Sid Wharton	FW	1897–1903	151	18	167	23	England unofficial	—		
Jim Hagan	DF	1982–1986	137	0	167	0	Northern Ireland U18	—		
George Allen	FB	1954–1961	134	0	166	0	—	—		
William Ball	FB	1911–1921	152	0	165	0	England Victory International	—		
Harold Booton	FB	1930–1935	150	2	163	2	—	—		
Kristian Pedersen	DF	2018–2022	155	9	161	9	Denmark	1		
Jimmy Calderwood	DF / MF	1972–1979	145	4	160	5	Scotland U23	—		
Paul Caddis	DF	2012–2013; 2013–2017	149	15	159	16	Scotland	1	(Note: Swindon Town)	
Nikola Žigić	FW	2010–2014; 2014–2015	137	32	159	36	Serbia	15		
Louie Donowa	MF	1991–1996	116	18	159	20	England U21	—		
Scott Hogan	FW	2020–2024	149	35	158	36	Republic of Ireland	3		
Ray Ranson	DF	1984–1988	137	0	158	0	England U21	—		
Frank White	FW	1933–1938	147	46	156	50	—	—		
Caesar Jenkyns	HB	1888–1895	131	18	155	20	Wales	4		
Chris Burke $	MF	2011–2014	131	24	155	27	Scotland	5		
Alan Curbishley	MF	1979–1983	130	11	155	15	England U21	—		
Ted Devey	HB	1888–1895	136	6	153	10	—	—		
Paul Furlong	FW	1996–2002	131	50	153	56	England semi-pro	—		
Dele Adebola	FW	1998–2001	129	31	152	42	—	—		
Dickie Dale	HB	1922–1928	146	0	151	0	—	—		
Jack Hallam	FW	1890–1895	133	54	151	62	Wales	0		
Tommy Hands	FW	1890–1896	135	39	150	42	—	—		
Wilson Jones	FW	1934–1946	134	63	150	71	Wales	2	(Note: Matthews attributes the only first-team appearance made by Fred Jones, against Stoke City on 1 September 1934, to Wilson Jones, who had not yet joined the club.)	
Dean Peer	MF	1986–1993	120	8	150	12	—	—		
Ron Wylie	MF	1965–1969	128	2	149	2	Scottish Schools	—		
Stan Lynn	DF	1961–1965	130	26	147	30	—	—		
Jimmy Bloomfield	FW	1960–1964	122	28	146	32	England U23	—		
Mark Dennis $	DF	1978–1983	130	1	145	1	England U21	—		
Bertie Auld	FW	1961–1965	125	26	145	31	Scotland	0		
Brian Farmer	FB	1956–1962	117	0	145	0	—	—		
Kenny Cunningham	DF	2002–2006	134	0	144	0	Republic of Ireland	32		
Keith Fahey	MF	2009–2013	121	9	144	9	Republic of Ireland	16		
Alec Leslie	HB	1927–1931	132	0	143	0	—	—		
Pat Van Den Hauwe	DF	1978–1984	123	1	143	1	Wales	0		
James Bumphrey	HB	1909–1915	137	7	142	7	—	—		
Billy Pratt	FB	1896–1901	129	1	142	1	—	—		
Jon McCarthy	MF	1997–2002	124	8	142	8	Northern Ireland	14		
Keith Bertschin	FW	1977–1981	118	29	141	41	England U21	—		
Paul Devlin $	MF / FW	1996–1997; 2002–2003	123	32	139	38	Scotland	10	(Note: Sheffield United)	
Don Dearson	U	1934–1947	131	17	137	17	Wales	2		
Ted Duckhouse	HB	1938–1950	119	4	137	4	—	—		
Billy Wright $	DF	1983–1986	111	8	137	14	England B	—		
Jim Dougherty	HB	1902–1907	130	3	136	3	—	—		
Stephen Clemence $	MF	2003–2007	121	8	135	9	England U21	—		
Ian Handysides	MF	1981–1983; 1986–1988	118	6	135	12	England youth	—		
Billy Ollis	HB	1891–1896	121	2	134	2	—	—		
Howard Kendall	MF	1974–1977	115	16	134	18	England	0		
Martin Kuhl	MF	1983–1987	111	5	134	7	—	—		
Peter Ndlovu	MF / FW	1997–2001	107	22	134	27	Zimbabwe	12		
David Murphy	DF	2008–2013	106	7	132	13	England youth	—		
Phil Summerill	FW	1967–1972	118	46	131	52	England youth	—		
Matthew Upson	DF	2003–2007	113	5	128	5	England	7		
Bobby Thomson	FW	1963–1967	112	23	128	25	—	—		
Tony Want	DF	1972–1977	101	1	128	2	England youth	—		
Dave Robinson	DF	1968–1972	112	2	127	4	—	—		
Charlie Calladine	HB	1931–1935	114	5	126	5	—	—		
Geoff Horsfield ‡$	FW	2000–2003	108	23	126	29	—	—		
Stephen Gleeson	MF	2014–2018	117	6	125	6	Republic of Ireland	2		
Joe Roulson	HB	1913–1922	116	4	125	4	—	—		
Krystian Bielik *	DF	2017; 2022–present	113	2	125	2	Poland	5	(Note: Derby County)	
Craig Gardner	MF	2010–2011; 2017–2019	109	14	125	16	England U21	—	(Note: West Bromwich Albion)	
Alan Ainscow $	MF	1978–1981	108	16	125	22	England youth	—		
John Glover	FB	1904–1907	116	2	124	2	—	—		
Gary Ablett	DF	1996–1999	104	1	124	2	England B	—		
Ché Adams $	FW	2016–2019	116	34	123	38	Scotland; England U20	0		
Terry Hibbitt	MF	1975–1978	110	11	122	11	—	—		
Stephen Carr	DF	2009–2012	106	0	121	0	Republic of Ireland	0		
Ken Leek	FW	1961–1964	105	49	121	60	Wales	5		
Bryan Orritt	FW	1956–1961	100	23	121	27	Wales U23	—		
Albert Gardner	HB	1909–1919	113	4	120	4	—	—		
Richard Gibson	FW	1911–1921	110	16	120	19	—	—		
Steve Claridge $	FW	1994–1996	88	35	120	42	—	—		
Harry Hooper	FW	1957–1960	105	34	119	42	England B	—		
Steve Whitton	FW	1986–1989	103	31	119	36	—	—		
Ted Linley	FW	1921–1926	113	11	118	11	—	—		
Jeff Wealands $	GK	1979–1982	102	0	118	0	—	—		
Mikael Forssell ‡$	FW	2003–2004; 2005–2008	101	30	118	37	Finland	28	(Note: Chelsea)	
Clayton Donaldson $	FW	2014–2017	113	32	117	33	Jamaica; England C	10		
Ian Atkins	MF	1988–1990; 1991–1992	101	6	117	9	—	—		
Martin Taylor	DF	2004–2009	99	2	117	3	England U21	—		
Jack Randle	FB	1927–1932	111	0	116	1	—	—		
Tom Grosvenor	FW	1931–1936	108	17	116	18	England	3		
Colin Withers	GK	1960–1964	98	0	116	0	English Schools	—		
Ian Rodgerson	MF	1990–1993	95	13	116	16	—	—		
Jackie Whitehouse	FW	1919–1923	110	31	115	35	—	—		
Archie Gemmill	MF	1979–1982	97	12	115	14	Scotland	10		
Johnny Gordon	FW	1958–1961	96	32	115	40	—	—		
Jimmy Harris	FW	1960–1964	93	37	115	53	England U23	—		
Johnny Berry	FW	1947–1951	104	6	114	6	England	0		
Tony Coton $	GK	1980–1984	94	0	114	0	England B	—		
Jack Dorrington	GK	1902–1912	106	0	111	0	—	—		
Billy Hughes	FB	1936–1947	105	0	111	0	Wales	10		
Juninho Bacuna	MF	2022–2024	105	11	111	13	Curaçao; Netherlands U21	15		
Tony Rees	FW	1983–1988	95	12	111	16	Wales	1		
David Cotterill	MF	2014–2017	103	14	109	15	Wales	4		
Harold Bodle	FW	1939–1949	94	32	109	37	—	—		
Mick Harford	FW	1982–1984	92	25	109	33	England	0		
Neil Dougall	FW	1946–1949	93	15	108	18	Scotland	1		
Colin Todd	DF	1979–1982	93	0	108	0	England	0		
Graham Sissons	DF	1957–1962	91	0	107	0	—	—		
Charlie Athersmith	FW	1901–1905	100	12	106	13	England	0		
Frank Mitchell	HB	1946–1949	93	6	106	8	—	—		
Ray Ferris	HB	1949–1953	93	3	106	4	Northern Ireland	3		
Curtis Davies $	DF	2011–2013	89	11	106	12	England U21; Sierra Leone	0		
Arthur Atkins	HB	1949–1954	97	0	105	0	—	—		
Jordan James	MF	2021–2024	95	9	105	10	Wales; England U20	11		
Wayne Clarke	FW	1984–1987	92	38	105	43	England youth	—		
Wade Elliott	MF	2011–2014	88	7	105	13	English Schools	—		
Barry Bridges	FW	1966–1968	83	35	104	45	England	0		
Jack Hall	FW	1910–1914	97	47	103	48	—	—		
Frank Mobley	FW	1892–1896	96	62	103	64	—	—		
Alf Tinkler	HB	1911–1915	96	3	103	4	—	—		
Tony Towers	MF	1977–1980	92	4	103	4	England	0		
William Robertson	U	1896–1899	91	14	103	15	—	—		
Gary Rowett	DF	1998–2000	87	6	103	11	—	—		
Andrew Johnson	FW	1998–2002	83	8	103	13	England	0		
Dave Langan $	DF	1980–1983	92	3	102	3	Republic of Ireland	10		
Julian Dicks	DF	1985–1988	89	1	102	1	England B	—		
Jonathan Hunt $	MF	1994–1997	77	18	102	25	—	—		
Gary Poole	DF	1994–1996	72	0	102	3	—	—		
Jérémie Bela	FW	2019–2022	96	7	101	9	Angola; France U16	1		
David Holdsworth	DF	1999–2001	85	7	101	8	England U21	—		

== Footnotes ==
Player statistics include games played while on loan from clubs listed below. Unless individually sourced, loaning clubs come from the appearances source or "Birmingham City: 1946/47–2013/14". Post War English & Scottish Football League A–Z Players Database. Neil Brown. Archived from the original on 9 June 2019.

== Sources ==
- Lewis, Peter, ed. (2000). Keeping right on since 1875. The Official History of Birmingham City Football Club. Lytham: Arrow. ISBN 1-900722-12-7.
- Matthews, Tony (1995). Birmingham City: A Complete Record. Derby: Breedon Books. ISBN 978-1-85983-010-9.
- Matthews, Tony (2000). The Encyclopedia of Birmingham City Football Club 1875–2000. Cradley Heath: Britespot. ISBN 978-0-9539288-0-4.
- Matthews, Tony (2010). Birmingham City: The Complete Record. Derby: Derby Books. ISBN 978-1-85983-853-2.
- Rollin, Glenda; Rollin, Jack, eds. (2010). Sky Sports Football Yearbook 2010–2011. Headline. ISBN 978-0-7553-6107-6.
- "Birmingham City". Soccerbase. Centurycomm.
