= 1961 Inter-Cities Fairs Cup final =

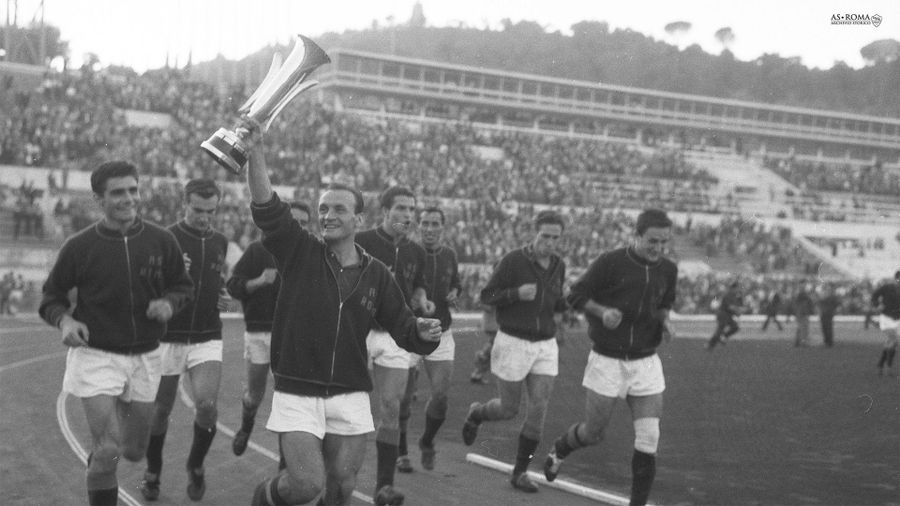
- AS Roma, champions
- Event: 1960–61 Inter-Cities Fairs Cup
Birmingham City	Roma
(England)	(Italy)
2	4
- on aggregate

First leg
Birmingham City	Roma
2	2
- Date: 27 September 1961
- Venue: St Andrew's, Birmingham
- Referee: Bobby Davidson (Scotland)
- Attendance: 21,000

Second leg
Roma	Birmingham City
2	0
- Date: 11 October 1961
- Venue: Stadio Olimpico, Rome
- Referee: Pierre Schwinte (France)
- Attendance: 60,000

The 1961 Inter-Cities Fairs Cup final was an association football match played over two legs between Roma of Italy and Birmingham City of England. The first leg was played in Birmingham on 27 September 1961, while the second leg was played on 11 October in Rome. It was the final of the third edition of the Inter-Cities Fairs Cup, an invitational competition open to teams representing host cities of industrial trade fairs. Birmingham had lost to Barcelona in the previous final; Roma were appearing for the first time.

Each club needed to progress through three rounds to reach the final. Matches were contested over two legs, with one leg at each team's home ground. Birmingham won all but one of their six legs. They defeated Inter Milan home and away: no other English team was to defeat Inter in the San Siro stadium for another 40 years. Roma took a lengthier route to the final: they required a replay in both quarter-final and semi-final, although won each replay by a comfortable margin.

In the first leg of the final, played in front of a crowd of only 21,000 at St Andrew's, Pedro Manfredini scored twice for Roma, and goalkeeper Fabio Cudicini made several high-class saves, before Mike Hellawell and Bryan Orritt scored late in the game to equalise the scores. In the second leg, watched by 60,000 spectators at the Stadio Olimpico, Roma won by two goals to nil to claim their first European trophy – an own goal when an attempted clearance rebounded off Brian Farmer's shin, and a shot from distance by Paolo Pestrin very late in the game while Birmingham's players were all upfield attacking.

== Background ==
As friendly matches had often been played between teams from cities hosting international trade fairs, a cup competition was first proposed in 1950 to provide a structure for such matches and make a contribution towards post-war economic recovery. Entry to the competition, which began in 1955 and became known as the Inter-Cities Fairs Cup, was by invitation extended not to football clubs but to the host cities. Some cities entered a selection including players from more than one of that city's clubs, while others, including Birmingham and Rome, were represented by a single club. In an attempt to schedule matches alongside the associated trade fairs, the first two editions of the competition took three and two playing seasons respectively to complete. Although the organising committee had intended the third edition, of which this final was the culmination, to be completed within the 1960–61 playing season, the final match was not played until several weeks into the next.

Birmingham City were one of the 12 original participants in the Fairs Cup, and were appearing in their second consecutive final, having lost 4–1 over two legs to Spanish champions Barcelona in 1960. In A.S. Roma's only prior appearance in European competition, they were eliminated by Union Saint-Gilloise at the quarter-final stage of the previous Fairs Cup.

In the 1960–61 domestic season, Roma finished fifth in Serie A and lost to eventual winners Fiorentina in the quarter-final of the main national cup competition, the Coppa Italia. Pat Beasley, who led Birmingham to the 1960 final, was replaced as manager by the club's former goalkeeper and appearance-record holder, Gil Merrick. Birmingham finished 19th in the First Division, avoiding relegation by just two points (equivalent to one win), for the second season running, and reached the fifth round (last 16) of the FA Cup.

== Route to the final ==
=== Roma ===
Route to the final: Roma
Round	Opposition	First leg	Second leg	Aggregate score	Replay
First	Union Saint-Gilloise	0–0 (a)	4–1 (h)	4–1	—
Quarter-final	Cologne XI	2–0 (a)	0–2 (h)	2–2	4–1 (h)
Semi-final	Hibernian	2–2 (a)	3–3 (h)	5–5	6–0 (h)

Roma began their campaign with a visit to Brussels to play Union Saint-Gilloise, who had eliminated them from the previous competition. Without both regular right-sided forwards, Alberto Orlando and Francisco Lojacono, and unbalanced further when full-back Alfio Fontana moved to the wing after sustaining an injury. Pedro Manfredini had a late goal ruled out for a clear offside, and the game finished goalless. The technically superior Roma team won the return leg comfortably; they scored three goals in the first half and each side converted a penalty kick in the second.

Their next opponents were the Cologne XI. Away from home, Roma took a 2–0 lead, through Manfredini and a second-half own goal. In Rome, they took advantage of their two-goal lead to play an experimental side, so that manager Alfredo Foni could decide on his lineup for the next league game, an awkward away fixture against Udinese. Giampaolo Menichelli and the 17-year-old Giancarlo De Sisti replaced the creative Juan Alberto Schiaffino and top scorer Manfredini, and Orlando was tried at centre-forward, with the intention of playing an attacking game. The experiment failed; the Roma team appeared to take the match too easily, and Cologne scored twice in the second half to tie the score on aggregate and force a replay. The replay took place in Rome, and the home side won comfortably, by four goals to one.

In the semi-final, they faced Hibernian of Scotland, who had created a shock by eliminating Barcelona to reach that stage. Roma had the better of the first leg, in Edinburgh; Lojacono scored twice, but they conceded a late equaliser. Rain fell throughout the second leg, and Joe Baker, subject of interest from Roma as well as other Italian clubs, helped Hibernian to a 3–1 lead after 65 minutes. Then Manfredini, with his second goal of the match, and Lojacono brought the scores level against a tiring Hibernian team. Again, a replay was needed, and again, it was played in Rome. The scheduled date, at the end of May, was well after the Scottish domestic season had finished, whereas the Italian league was still in progress. Roma took full advantage of playing at home while still match-fit. Despite reports that "his own club officials say he is carrying too much weight and won't train", Lojacono was the creative force as Manfredini scored four times in a 6–0 win.

=== Birmingham City ===
Route to the final: Birmingham City
Round	Opposition	First leg	Second leg	Aggregate score
First	Újpesti Dózsa	3–2 (h)	2–1 (a)	5–3
Quarter-final	KB	4–4 (h)	5–0 (a)	9–4
Semi-final	Inter Milan	2–1 (a)	2–1 (h)	4–2

Birmingham played Hungarians Újpesti Dózsa in the first round, with the first leg to be played at home. Újpest twice took the lead, equalised by a Johnny Gordon header and Gordon Astall's shot. Birmingham's repeated attacks broke down near goal, until after 83 minutes Gordon headed home an Astall corner. In the away leg, Újpest took a one-goal lead after an hour, that tied the scores on aggregate, before Gordon was sent off. This left Birmingham facing "tough opposition and downright one-sided refereeing" without their centre-forward. But Billy Rudd scored with three minutes left, then combined with debutant Ray Barlow in a "walking-pace attack" for Jimmy Singer to clinch the tie with a rising shot.

In Copenhagen, melted snow and rain left standing water on the pitch, and the kickoff had been moved to late afternoon so that the match against KB could be televised. This meant the attendance was very low, and the floodlighting was inadequate. Having twice taken a two-goal lead, Birmingham conceded two late goals and the game ended 4–4. Young goalkeeper Colin Withers had let in six goals in his first appearance as replacement for Johnny Schofield, who had fractured his skull, but made several saves to keep Birmingham from losing this match. The Daily Mirror reporter suggested that if the other forwards had taken full advantage of new signing Jimmy Bloomfield's creativity, the score would have been rather different. The score in the home leg was indeed different. Goals from Robin Stubbs (2), Bloomfield, Mike Hellawell, and debutant Jimmy Harris gave Birmingham a 9–4 aggregate victory.

Birmingham's poor disciplinary record – Gordon's dismissal was their fifth in a year in matches abroad – caused the Football Association to ban the club from playing overseas "until [they] have given firm undertakings to uphold the prestige and reputation of British clubs and the F.A. at all times." They must have complied, for the visit to Milan to play Inter Milan in the semi-final took place in April as scheduled. Four consecutive defeats had knocked Inter off the top of the league and they had been eliminated from the Coppa Italia. La Stampa described how Birmingham, playing a straightforward, unsophisticated game based around teamwork and athleticism, had little trouble in extending this losing streak. Harris scored the first goal after 12 minutes, after a speedy passing move between Terry Hennessey and Bloomfield, whom the Daily Express called "the most artistic player on the field". The second was an own goal, when Hellawell crossed from the right and Harris's header was touched into the net by Costanzo Balleri. Inter scored with 15 minutes left when Mario Corso's wayward shot was turned in off Eddie Firmani's chest, and Withers made a fine close-range save near the end to preserve the lead.

Winger Bertie Auld was involved in both Birmingham's goals as they repeated the 2–1 scoreline in the second leg. After just three minutes, Buffon punched out Auld's powerful shot to Neal, whose shot rebounded off the post to Harris who opened the scoring. Then after 65 minutes, Auld was fouled. He took the free kick himself, a hard, low cross from which Harris scored with a diving header. Roma had two goal-bound attempts cleared off the line before Enea Masiero's 20-yard (18 m) shot beat Schofield, but Birmingham's defence stood firm.

== First leg ==
Going into this match, Birmingham were bottom of the table with only one win in ten games. The previous week, forward Robin Stubbs had dislocated his shoulder, and during a Football League Cup replay unhelpfully scheduled for the Monday night, 48 hours before the Roma match, England international Trevor Smith had to leave the field with a thigh strain as Birmingham lost to Third Division side Swindon Town. The 19-year-old Winston Foster, who had previously been used only at right-back, took Smith's place at centre-half, alongside Hennessey and Malcolm Beard in a half-back line composed entirely of teenagers. The players were intended to enjoy a relaxing visit to Warwick Castle the day before the game, but the weather was so wet that the trip was cancelled.

During the 1961 close season, Luis Carniglia had succeeded Foni as manager. Roma were unbeaten at home in the 1961–62 season, but had not yet won away. Their travelling party arrived on the Monday; they went shopping the next morning, used Birmingham's training ground in the afternoon, and were to attend a banquet in their honour after Wednesday's game. Roma omitted forward Francisco Lojacono from their selection because he was the subject of a bid from A.C. Milan, who hoped to sign the player before their local derby against Inter Milan the next weekend, and the club were unwilling to risk injury putting paid to any prospective sale.

The game was even for the first half-hour, then Manfredini scored a shot on the turn to give Roma the lead. They doubled their lead a quarter of an hour into the second half, "thanks once more to the brilliant opportunism of Manfredini", whom the Birmingham Mail described as "a splendid centre-forward who acted as a one-man attack for most of the match". Despite most of the attacking play coming from the home side, they found Cudicini in excellent form, and it was not until the last ten minutes of the match that Mike Hellawell's snap-shot surprised the goalkeeper to make it 2-1. With just two minutes left of normal time, Harris hit the bar, and in a goalmouth scramble, the ball was forced home by Bryan Orritt – who had fallen out of favour and been on the transfer list for several months – to give Birmingham a late equaliser.

The potentially explosive "mixture of Blues' uncompromising tackling and the blocking and pushing of the Italians" was highlighted when Roma's manager reacted to full-back Brian Farmer pulling Menichelli down by running onto the pitch to protest. Under a weaker referee than the Scotsman Bobby Davidson, the "match of high tension and frayed nerves" might have got out of control.

=== Details ===
27 September 1961
19:15

Birmingham City (England)	2–2	(Italy) Roma
Hellawell 78'; Orritt 85'		Manfredini 30', 56'

St Andrew's, Birmingham
Attendance: 21,005
Referee: Bobby Davidson (Scotland)

Birmingham City

Roma

GK	1	(England) Johnny Schofield
RB	2	(England) Brian Farmer
LB	3	(England) Graham Sissons
RH	4	(Wales) Terry Hennessey
CH	5	(England) Winston Foster
LH	6	(England) Malcolm Beard
OR	7	(England) Mike Hellawell
IR	8	(England) Jimmy Bloomfield (c)
CF	9	(England) Jimmy Harris
IL	10	(Wales) Bryan Orritt
OL	11	(Scotland) Bertie Auld
Manager:
(England) Gil Merrick

GK	1	(Italy) Fabio Cudicini
RB	2	(Italy) Alfio Fontana
LB	3	(Italy) Giulio Corsini
CB	4	(Italy) Luigi Giuliano
CB	5	(Italy) Giacomo Losi (c)
MF	6	(Italy) Sergio Carpanesi
MF	7	(Italy) Alberto Orlando
MF	8	(Italy) Dino da Costa
FW	9	(Argentina) Pedro Manfredini
FW	10	(Italy) Antonio Valentín Angelillo
FW	11	(Italy) Giampaolo Menichelli
Manager:
(Argentina) Luis Carniglia

== Second leg ==
The second leg took place in Rome's Stadio Olimpico two weeks later. Originally scheduled to be played in the evening, under floodlights, it was switched to an afternoon kickoff. Birmingham were still bottom of the league, having just lost 6–3 to Wolverhampton Wanderers and sold their club captain, Dick Neal. Team captain Jimmy Bloomfield was being watched by A.C. Milan as a potential successor to the recently retired Nils Liedholm. A party of 14 players and the same number of officials flew to Rome the day before the game, as did a special flight carrying around 60 Birmingham fans. Three Roma players, Lojacono, Antonio Angelillo and Giacomo Losi, were allowed to report late for international duty in order to play in this match, though Omar Sívori, Angelillo's rival for the playmaker role in Italy's team, thought country should take precedence over club. Manfredini, top scorer in this edition of the Fairs Cup with 12 goals, proved his return to fitness after injury by scoring four goals in a reserve game.

In the first few minutes of the match, Roma failed to convert three clear chances. After ten minutes, manager Carniglia ran 60 yards (55 m) onto the pitch to confront Birmingham captain Bloomfield, who was bending over an injured Roma player. Following an incident between Bryan Orritt and Giampaolo Menichelli, blows were exchanged among the players, and Carniglia had to be restrained by Roma officials from joining in. This time, Birmingham manager Gil Merrick followed Carniglia onto the pitch, feeling he "had to be there to try and cool things down". Play continued, albeit still marred by a lack of discipline. As in the first leg, Birmingham's physical approach provoked reactions from the Roma players. Menichelli was carried off injured after an incident with Brian Farmer, Lojacono raised his hands to the referee, who took no action, and the game reached the interval still goalless, which La Stampa thought a fair reflection of the half.

The match was hostile both on and off the field. Jimmy Harris recalled the Roma players hanging back as the teams approached the pitch, leaving their visitors to be showered with cups of sand which penetrated the wire mesh protecting players from items thrown from above. Although the Birmingham team – nicknamed the "Brummie bashers" in the tabloid press – had a reputation for physicality, the Daily Mirror expressed amazement at their self-control "as the Italians used every trick of body checking and obstruction to make things run their way". At half-time, the referee warned both captains that any further display of indiscipline or temper would result in the culprit being sent off, and issued an individual warning to Lojacono.

After 61 minutes, a move begun by Lojacono ended with an attempted clearance of his shot striking Farmer on the shins and rebounding into the net. La Stampa remarked on the improved player discipline once Roma had the lead. Birmingham rallied for a short period after the goal, and Orritt and Singer each "missed the sort of chances that cannot be ignored in cup games", before Roma regained control. Manfredini missed three good chances and hit the post with the goalkeeper beaten, and the outclassed Birmingham side finally resorted to before, in the second minute of stoppage time, Paolo Pestrin broke forward and hit a powerful shot from distance into the top corner of the net.

The trophy was presented to Losi, the Roma captain, by Sir Stanley Rous, newly elected president of FIFA. Stampa Sera described Roma as deserving of their win, as the technically superior side who had had more possession, but accepted that the two goals that made the difference were both fortuitous. They were not surprised that Birmingham were bottom of the league, and rated only Trevor Smith and the 18-year-old Mike Hellawell as good players. Merrick agreed "that Roma were the better footballing side and deserved to win. But they did not show any sportsmanship." Media both English and Italian singled out Lojacono as "the outstanding performer" who "outgeneralled" his opponents, but whose "fiery temper ...continually spoiled a superb performance"; who provoked his opponents, started fights and man-handled the referee but was instrumental in the move that forced Farmer's own goal and was involved in the late winner.

=== Details ===
11 October 1961
15:30

Roma	2–0	Birmingham City
Farmer 56' (o.g.); Pestrin 90'

Stadio Olimpico, Rome
Attendance: 60,000
Referee: Pierre Schwinte (France)

Roma

Birmingham City

GK	1	(Italy) Fabio Cudicini
RB	2	(Italy) Alfio Fontana
LB	3	(Italy) Giulio Corsini
CB	4	(Italy) Paolo Pestrin
CB	5	(Italy) Giacomo Losi (c)
MF	6	(Italy) Sergio Carpanesi
MF	7	(Italy) Alberto Orlando
MF	8	(Italy) Francisco Lojacono
FW	9	(Argentina) Pedro Manfredini
FW	10	(Italy) Antonio Valentín Angelillo
FW	11	(Italy) Giampaolo Menichelli
Manager:
(Argentina) Luis Carniglia

GK	1	(England) Johnny Schofield
RB	2	(England) Brian Farmer
LB	3	(England) Graham Sissons
RH	4	(Wales) Terry Hennessey
CH	5	(England) Trevor Smith
LH	6	(England) Malcolm Beard
OR	7	(England) Mike Hellawell
IR	8	(England) Jimmy Bloomfield (c)
CF	9	(England) Jimmy Harris
IL	10	(Wales) Bryan Orritt
OL	11	(Wales) Jimmy Singer
Manager:
(England) Gil Merrick

== Post-match ==
The fourth edition of the competition saw an increased number of entries, from 16 to 28. Neither Roma nor Birmingham qualified for the European Cup, open only to domestic league champions, or for the Cup Winners' Cup, but both accepted invitations to participate in the 1961–62 Fairs Cup. As finalists, both were given byes to the second round, and both lost heavily, Roma to Sheffield Wednesday and Birmingham against Espanyol of Barcelona. Since 1961, Roma have been regular participants in European competition: they reached the 1984 European Cup Final and the 1991 UEFA Cup Final but lost on each occasion. Birmingham did not compete in major European football again for fifty years, until an unexpected victory in the 2011 Football League Cup Final earned them qualification for the 2011–12 UEFA Europa League.

== See also ==
- Birmingham City F.C. in European football
- A.S. Roma in European football
