= Hellawell =

Hellawell is a surname. Notable people with the surname include:

- John Hellawell (born 1943), English footballer
- Keith Hellawell (born 1942), English businessman and police officer
- Mike Hellawell (1938–2023), English footballer
- Piers Hellawell (born 1956), British classical composer
