= Mike Hellawell =

English footballer and cricketer (1938–2023)

Personal information
- Full name: Michael Stephen Hellawell
- Date of birth: 30 June 1938
- Place of birth: Keighley, England
- Date of death: 18 July 2023 (aged 85)
- Place of death: Keighley, England
- Height: 5 ft 11 in (1.80 m)
- Position: Outside right

Senior career*
Years	Team	Apps	(Gls)
195?–1955	Salts		
1955–1957	Queens Park Rangers	45	(7)
1957–1965	Birmingham City	178	(30)
1965–1966	Sunderland	44	(2)
1966–1968	Huddersfield Town	46	(1)
1968–1969	Peterborough United	9	(0)
1969–1972	Bromsgrove Rovers	96	(14)
Total		418	(54)

International career
1962	England	2	(0)
- * Club domestic league appearances and goals

Michael Stephen Hellawell (30 June 1938 – 18 July 2023) was an English professional footballer who played as an outside forward. He made 322 appearances in the Football League and played twice for England in 1962.

== Club career ==
=== Queens Park Rangers ===
The 17-year-old Hellawell signed for Queens Park Rangers in August 1955 from Salts, a small Yorkshire League club from Saltaire, and made his debut in the home match against Exeter City on 25 February 1956. That was his only senior appearance of the season, but in 1956–57 he missed only two matches in all competitions, and was selected to play for the Third Division South representative team against the Northern Section in April 1957. He played 45 games in the Football League for Rangers before being transferred to Birmingham City in 1957 in part-exchange for inside-forward Bill Finney and "a good fee". When questioned by disappointed supporters, manager Jack Taylor explained that Hellawell had signed for Rangers on condition that "they would not stand in his way if a First Division Club came after him."

=== Birmingham City ===
Hellawell joined Birmingham City on 15 May 1957, and made his debut on 7 September, at home to Newcastle United, after the established outside right Gordon Astall was left out. The visitors took a 2–0 lead early in the second half before Hellawell, who had received little service on the wing, drifted into the centre, won the ball, and scored with a deflected shot from outside the penalty area. The match ended as a 4–1 defeat, Astall returned to the team, and Hellawell made only one more first-team appearance over the next two years, because of the form of Astall and Harry Hooper as well as his National Service duties. He had a short run in the side in the 1959–60 season, was considered unlucky to lose his place, and finally established himself after Hooper's transfer to Sunderland in September 1960.

He finished the 1960–61 season as Birmingham's top league scorer, jointly with Jimmy Harris, with 10 goals. He played in all six of their 1960–61 Inter-Cities Fairs Cup ties, scored against the Copenhagen XI, and supplied the cross from which Costanzo Balleri scored an own goal that won the semi-final first leg against Internazionale to set a record that Birmingham held for more than 40 years: the only English team to beat Inter in a competitive match in their own stadium. In the first leg of the final, in Birmingham, visitors Roma led 2–0; Hellawell pulled a goal back with 10 minutes left, and Bryan Orritt scored a late equaliser. In the second, Roma had much the better of the game, and won 2–0; Stampa Sera were not surprised that Birmingham were bottom of the league, and rated only Trevor Smith and Hellawell as good players.

Over the next three seasons, Hellawell missed only five matches in all competitions. He was on the winning side in the 1963 League Cup final as Birmingham beat local rivals Aston Villa 3–1 over two legs. Having won the home leg 3–1, Birmingham were "eager to protect their lead rather than add to it" in the second, and the Birmingham Post's Cyril Chapman noted how Hellawell "seemed to have difficulty in finding a convenient spot on which to place the ball for corner-kicks".

In September 1964, it was reported that Aston Villa had made a bid of £40,000 for Hellawell's services, but Birmingham's temporary shortage of available players meant it was not immediately acted upon. In the meantime, Villa signed an alternative winger, but Hellawell was unsettled by the reports and the implication that Birmingham were prepared to sell him. After "peace talks" with the club's general manager, he did not proceed with a transfer request, and continued as a regular starter until losing his place in November because of injury. He played for the reserves – taking over in goal on one occasion after Terry Twell was concussed, and conceding only once – but there was no place for him in first-team coach Joe Mallett's new formation which employed a defender in the inside-right position.

=== Sunderland ===
On 23 January 1965, Hellawell signed for Sunderland for a fee reported as around £30,000. He made an eventful start: on his debut, against Blackpool he suffered double vision and a broken nose. During the second half of the next match, at Sheffield Wednesday, he developed a headache. He left to go home, but was found in the street in a confused state, spent the weekend in a local hospital, and declared himself unfit for the next match. He played regularly for the rest of the season and scored twice.

Substitution was first permitted by the Football League in the 1965–66 season. Hellawell was left out of Sunderland's starting eleven for their first match of that season by new manager Ian McColl, but was named as substitute. He remained unused, and two weeks later he became the first Sunderland player to be substituted, when he was injured early in the second half of the visit to Aston Villa and replaced by Allan Gauden. He started in two-thirds of Sunderland's league matches, scored once, played once in the first few weeks of the 1966–67 season, and was placed on the transfer list on 7 September.

=== Huddersfield Town ===
Hellawell signed for Second Division club Huddersfield Town on 22 September 1966 for a fee "believed to be in the region of £20,000". The Huddersfield Daily Examiner's football correspondent, Longfellow, had not seen him play, but had heard "he's fast, fearless and aggressive. He's a fighter and a 100 per center, so I'm told, and on that score alone he will do for me." As a youth, Hellawell had played for Huddersfield's junior teams but been told he was too frail for professional football. He started every game until mid-April 1967, when a throat infection kept him out, and finished the season with one goal from 32 appearances.

An ankle injury in pre-season caused Hellawell to miss the first month of the 1967–68 season, and he was unable to establish himself in the League side thereafter. He played in the team's run to the semi-finals of the League Cup, and assisted goals for Colin Dobson in the first leg and for Tony Leighton in the second, but opponents Arsenal won 6–3 on aggregate to progress to the final. By late February 1968, when he was injured early in a match against Plymouth Argyle, he had made only 14 league appearances. When he regained fitness, he was used in the reserves, and when senior coach Ian Greaves took over as manager in June, Hellawell remained out of favour.

=== Later career ===
At the end of November 1968, Hellawell signed for Fourth Division club Peterborough United for a £4,000 fee. He played two competitive matches before the manager who signed him, Norman Rigby, was replaced by Jim Iley as player-manager. According to Hellawell in his autobiography, Iley told him "he had no time for wingers", and Hellawell finished the season with nine appearances.

Although Hellawell had no intention of retiring from league football when he left Peterborough at the end of the season, he had bought a newsagent's shop in Keighley, so was reluctant to accept offers from clubs too far from home. His former manager at Birmingham, Gil Merrick, offered him a contract with West Midlands League club Bromsgrove Rovers, with permission to train at Keighley and drive down for matches on Saturdays and on the understanding that if a suitable league club made him an offer, he would be free to leave. Hellawell took up Merrick's offer – his brother John joined him at Bromsgrove a month later – and both ended up spending three years with the club. Merrick wanted Hellawell to stay on for the 1972–73 season, but his newsagent's business had expanded such that he felt he did not have the time.

== International career ==
Whilst with Birmingham City, Hellawell won his two full caps for England, against France and Northern Ireland in 1962.

== Career statistics ==
Appearances and goals by club, season and competition
Club	Season	League			FA Cup		League Cup		Other		Total	
Club	Season	Division	Apps	Goals	Apps	Goals	Apps	Goals	Apps	Goals	Apps	Goals
Queens Park Rangers	1955–56	Third Division South	1	0	0	0	—		—		1	0
Queens Park Rangers	1956–57	Third Division South	44	7	3	1	—		—		47	8
Queens Park Rangers	Total		45	7	3	1	—		—		48	8
Birmingham City	1957–58	First Division	1	1	0	0	—		0	0	1	1
Birmingham City	1958–59	First Division	1	0	0	0	—		0	0	1	0
Birmingham City	1959–60	First Division	11	0	0	0	—		1	0	12	0
Birmingham City	1960–61	First Division	28	10	3	0	3	1	6	1	40	12
Birmingham City	1961–62	First Division	42	7	2	0	2	0	4	1	50	8
Birmingham City	1962–63	First Division	40	5	2	0	9	0	—		51	5
Birmingham City	1963–64	First Division	39	5	1	0	1	0	—		41	5
Birmingham City	1964–65	First Division	16	2	0	0	1	0	—		17	2
Birmingham City	Total		178	30	8	0	16	1	11	2	213	33
Sunderland	1964–65	First Division	14	2	0	0	—		—		14	2
Sunderland	1965–66	First Division	29	1	0	0	2	0	—		31	1
Sunderland	1966–67	First Division	1	0	—		0	0	—		1	0
Sunderland	Total		44	3	0	0	2	0	—		46	3
Huddersfield Town	1966–67	Second Division	31	1	1	0	—		—		32	1
Huddersfield Town	1967–68	Second Division	15	0	1	0	6	0	—		22	0
Huddersfield Town	Total		46	1	2	0	6	0	—		54	1
Peterborough United	1968–69	Fourth Division	9	0	—		—		—		9	0
Bromsgrove Rovers	1969–70	West Midlands Premier Div	36	5	0	0	—		23 (Note: Eleven appearances and two goals in Midland Floodlit League, three appearances each in FA Trophy and West Midlands League Cup, two appearances each in Worcestershire Senior Cup and Camkin Cup, one appearance each in President's Cup and Midland Floodlit League Cup)	2	59	7
Bromsgrove Rovers	1970–71	West Midlands Premier Div	34	4	5	0	—		22 (Note: Ten appearances and two goals in Midland Floodlit League, three appearances each in FA Trophy, Worcestershire Senior Cup and President's Cup, two appearances and one goal in West Midlands League Cup, one appearance in Camkin Cup)	3	61	7
Bromsgrove Rovers	1971–72	West Midlands Premier Div	26	5	2	0	—		17 (Note: Six appearances and one goal in Border Counties League, four appearances and two goals in President's Cup, three appearances in FA Trophy, two appearances and one goal in West Midlands League Cup, one appearance each in Worcestershire Senior Cup and Camkin Cup)	4	45	9
Bromsgrove Rovers	Total		96	14	7	0	—		62	9	165	23
Career total			418	55	20	1	24	1	73	11	535	68

== Cricket career ==
Hellawell showed promise as a cricket all-rounder for Yorkshire Second XI and for Warwickshire, for whom he played one first-class match.

== Personal life ==
Hellawell was born in Keighley, West Riding of Yorkshire. He and his brother John, who also went on to play football professionally, attended St Bede's Grammar School in Bradford. After leaving school he worked as a colour-matcher in a textile mill. He was called up for National Service in 1957 and served with the Royal Army Medical Corps.

Hellawell was married to Brenda for 60 years, and was an active Christian. After retiring from professional sport, he worked for clothing manufacturer Damart. He published an autobiography, The Impossible is Possible, in late 2020. A grandson, Jacob Rowan, played professional rugby.

Hellawell died in Keighley on 18 July 2023 at age 85.

== Honours ==
Birmingham City

- Football League Cup: 1962–63
- Inter-Cities Fairs Cup runner-up: 1960–61

== Sources ==
- Hellawell, Michael (2020). The Impossible is Possible. Independently Published. ISBN 979-8587238053.
- Matthews, Tony (1995). Birmingham City: A Complete Record. Derby: Breedon Books. ISBN 978-1-85983-010-9.
