= Pestrin =

Pestrin is an Italian surname. Notable people with the surname include:

- Manolo Pestrin (born 1978), Italian footballer
- Marika Pestrin (born 1987), Italian artistic gymnast
- Paolo Pestrin (1936–2009), Italian footballer
- Silvio Pestrin Farina (born 1975), Argentine businessman
