= Anthea Redfern =

British television personality

- Born: Anthea Bernice Redfern; 15 April 1948 (age 78); Newton Abbot, Devon, England
- Occupation: Television host
- Spouses: Robin Stubbs (m. 1967, divorced); Bruce Forsyth (m. 1973; div. 1982); Freddie Hoffman (divorced)

Anthea Bernice Redfern (born 15 April 1948) is a British former television host, best known as the assistant to Bruce Forsyth, her husband of eight years, on the BBC's The Generation Game during its first run in the 1970s.

Redfern was born in Newton Abbot, Devon. She trained as a dancer, and then went on to work as a model in Paris and the United Kingdom. She was one of the first models to appear on Page 3 of The Sun, albeit not topless. In 1969 Redfern became a Playboy Bunny working in the London club in Park Lane, where her bunny name was Sasha. She became "Miss London" in 1970. Her first marriage was to Torquay United and Bristol Rovers footballer Robin Stubbs. Redfern auditioned against fifty-two other applicants and was chosen to host The Generation Game with Forsyth.

Forsyth and Redfern had an affair, and Forsyth and his wife of twenty years, Penny Calvert, divorced in 1973. Redfern and Forsyth married on Christmas Eve 1973 at Windsor Register Office, and had two daughters. They divorced in 1982 and Redfern subsequently married hotelier Freddie Hoffman, with whom she had a daughter; she and Hoffman later divorced. Redfern now lives mostly in Marbella, Spain, and has appeared again on British television, including an appearance on Come Dine with Me.
