= Alberto Orlando =

Italian footballer (born 1938)

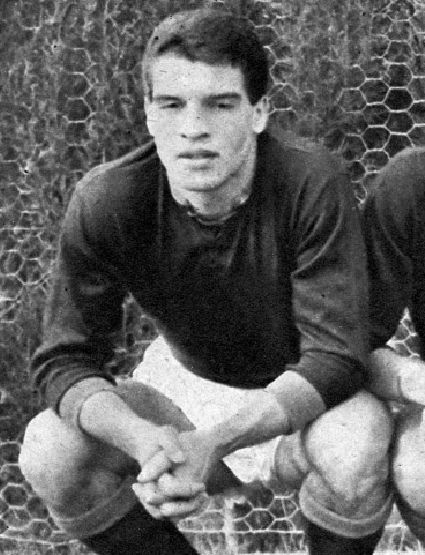
- Orlando with Roma

Personal information
- Date of birth: 27 September 1938 (age 88)
- Place of birth: Rome, Italy
- Position: Forward

Senior career*
Years	Team	Apps	(Gls)
1957–1964	Roma	140	(34)
1958–1959	→ Messina (loan)	30	(17)
1964–1965	Fiorentina	32	(17)
1965–1966	Torino	25	(5)
1966–1968	Napoli	60	(11)
1968–1969	SPAL 1907	6	(0)
Total		293	(84)

International career
1962–1965	Italy	5	(4)
- * Club domestic league appearances and goals

Alberto Orlando (Italian pronunciation: [alˈbɛrto orˈlando]; born 27 September 1938) is an Italian former footballer who played at both professional and international levels as a forward. Although not gifted with the best technical ability, he was a fast, physical, energetic, opportunistic, and powerful player, who was good in the air; he often played on the wing or through the centre of the pitch.

== Club career ==
Born in Rome, Orlando played for Roma, Messina (briefly on a season loan from Roma), Fiorentina, Torino, Napoli and SPAL 1907 throughout his career. He is mostly remembered for his seven-year club career with Roma, the team with which he won the 1960–61 Inter-Cities Fairs Cup, and the 1963–64 Coppa Italia, forming a formidable partnership with Giampaolo Menichelli. In total, he managed 142 Serie A appearances and 34 goals in Serie A with Roma. During his time at Roma, he was briefly loaned to Serie B side Messina during the 1958–59 season, scoring 17 goals in 30 appearances. After leaving Roma, he moved to Fiorentina, where he also achieved notable success. He became the Serie A top scorer during the 1964–65 season, alongside scudetto winner Sandro Mazzola, and he helped the club to a fourth-place finish in the league. That season, he also helped Fiorentina to reach the final of the 1965 Mitropa Cup. Orlando spent his final season with Serie B side SPAL, making 6 appearances, before retiring in 1969.

== International career ==
Orlando represented the Italy national team between 1962 and 1965, making 5 appearances, and scoring 4 goals. After his notable and positive successful performances with Roma, he made his international debut against Turkey, on 2 December 1962, in Bologna, in a UEFA Euro 1964 qualifying match. Orlando scored all 4 of his international goals in Italy's 6–0 victory. He also appeared in the return leg, where he suffered a temporary injury.

== Career statistics ==
=== International goals ===
#	Date	Venue	Opponent	Score	Result	Competition
1.	2 December 1962	Stadio Littoriale, Bologna, Italy	Turkey	6–0	Win	1964 European Nations' Cup qualifying
2.	2 December 1962	Stadio Littoriale, Bologna, Italy	Turkey	6–0	Win	1964 European Nations' Cup qualifying
3.	2 December 1962	Stadio Littoriale, Bologna, Italy	Turkey	6–0	Win	1964 European Nations' Cup qualifying
4.	2 December 1962	Stadio Littoriale, Bologna, Italy	Turkey	6–0	Win	1964 European Nations' Cup qualifying
Correct as of 1 June 2012

== Honours ==
=== Club ===
Roma

- Inter-Cities Fairs Cup: 1960–61
- Coppa Italia: 1963–64

=== Individual ===
- Serie A Top scorer: 1964–65
