= George Allen (footballer, born 1932) =

English footballer (1932–2016)

Personal information
- Full name: George Henry Allen
- Date of birth: 23 January 1932
- Place of birth: Small Heath, Birmingham, England
- Date of death: 13 July 2016 (aged 84)
- Place of death: Solihull, England
- Height: 5 ft 9 in (1.75 m)
- Position: Left-back

Senior career*
Years	Team	Apps	(Gls)
19??–1952	Coventry City		
1952–1962	Birmingham City (Note: Some sources list Allen with 135 League appearances, an error which possibly stems from Matthews (1995) attributing an appearance in Birmingham's match against Blackburn Rovers in March 1961 to Allen rather than to Graham Sissons who actually played in the match.)	134	(0)
1962–1965	Torquay United	134	(0)
1965–19??	Bideford		
- * Club domestic league appearances and goals

George Henry Allen (23 January 1932 – 13 July 2016) was an English footballer who played more than 250 games in the Football League.

== Playing career ==
Allen was born in Small Heath, Birmingham. A strong-tackling left-back, he joined Coventry City as an amateur while in the army but made no first-team appearances. In November 1952, he joined Birmingham City on a free transfer, and made his league debut the following season on 19 April 1954 in a Second Division game against Nottingham Forest at St Andrew's which ended 2–2. The form of established full-back pairing Ken Green and Jeff Hall meant Allen was unable to establish himself as a regular in the side, making only 30 appearances in his first seven years at the club. When Green sustained the injury which eventually forced his retirement, Allen took his place and kept it until suffering a fractured skull in 1961. On his recovery, he could not regain his place, mainly due to the form of Graham Sissons. After almost ten years at the club, and 166 games in all competitions, he joined Torquay United in January 1962, following in the footsteps of Birmingham teammate Gordon Astall who had made the same move six months earlier.

He made his Torquay debut in a 4–2 home win over Hull City on 20 January 1962 and was ever-present for the remainder of the season. The following season, he missed just one game as Torquay finished sixth in Division Four. He began the 1963–64 season out of the side, Frank Austin beginning the season at left-back in his place. However, after three games, Allen regained his place and Austin switched to right-back in place of Colin Bettany. Allen went to play in 40 league games that season, as well as all three of Torquay's cup ties. He began the 1964–65 season as a regular, but lost his place to Tony Hellin late in the season.

In 1965 he moved to north Devon club Bideford, who played in the Western League. He had played 134 league games for Torquay, and failed to score for either of his league clubs. He died on 13 July 2016.

== Career statistics ==
Appearances and goals by club, season and competition
Club	Season	League			FA Cup		League Cup		Fairs Cup		Total	
Club	Season	Division	Apps	Goals	Apps	Goals	Apps	Goals	Apps	Goals	Apps	Goals
Birmingham City	1953–54	Second Division	1	0	0	0	—		—		1	0
Birmingham City	1954–55	Second Division	13	0	0	0	—		—		13	0
Birmingham City	1955–56	First Division	2	0	0	0	—		1	0	3	0
Birmingham City	1956–57	First Division	8	0	2	0	—		1	0	11	0
Birmingham City	1957–58	First Division	4	0	0	0	—		2	0	6	0
Birmingham City	1958–59	First Division	27	0	6	0	—		3	0	36	0
Birmingham City	1959–60	First Division	36	0	1	0	—		3	0	40	0
Birmingham City	1960–61	First Division	38	0	3	0	3	0	6	0	50	0
Birmingham City	1961–62	First Division	5	0	—		1	0	0	0	6	0
Birmingham City	Total		134	0	12	0	4	0	16	0	166	0
Torquay United	1961–62	Third Division	19	0	—		—		—		19	0
Torquay United	1962–63	Fourth Division	45	0	2	0	2	0	—		49	0
Torquay United	1963–64	Fourth Division	40	0	2	0	1	0	—		43	0
Torquay United	1963–64	Fourth Division	30	0	4	0	1	0	—		35	0
Torquay United	Total		134	0	8	0	4	0	0	0	146	0
Career total			268	0	20	0	8	0	16	0	312	0
