= Terry Twell =

English footballer

Personal information
- Full name: Terence Keith Twell
- Date of birth: 21 February 1947
- Place of birth: Doncaster, England
- Date of death: 27 February 2013 (aged 66)
- Position: Goalkeeper

Senior career*
Years	Team	Apps	(Gls)
1964	Bourne Town	12	(0)
1964–1968	Birmingham City	2	(0)
1968–19??	Stamford		
1969–1970	Bromsgrove Rovers		
- * Club domestic league appearances and goals

Terence Keith "Terry" Twell (21 February 1947 – 27 February 2013) was an English professional footballer who played in the Football League for Birmingham City. He played as a goalkeeper.

Twell was born in Doncaster, which is now in South Yorkshire. He began his football career with Bourne Town, and turned professional with Birmingham City in October 1964. Manager Stan Cullis gave him his debut in place of Jim Herriot in the Second Division on 14 October 1967 at home to Portsmouth. He was beaten by a 30-yard lob in that game, which finished as a 2–2 draw, conceded four goals in the next, and that was the end of his career in the Football League. He moved into non-league football with Stamford the following year, and was on the books of Bromsgrove Rovers during the 1969–70 season.

Twell died on 27 February 2013, aged 66.
