= Jens Torstensen =

Danish footballer (1928–2003)

Personal information
- Date of birth: 11 November 1928
- Date of death: 30 November 2003 (aged 75)
- Position: Forward

Senior career*
| Years | Team | Apps | (Gls) |
- Odense KFUM
- * Club domestic league appearances and goals

Jens Torstensen (11 November 1928 – 30 November 2003) was a Danish footballer. He was part of Denmark's squad at the 1952 Summer Olympics, but he did not play in any matches.
