= John Hellawell =

English footballer (1943–2019)

Personal information
- Full name: John Rodney Hellawell
- Date of birth: 20 December 1943
- Place of birth: Keighley, England
- Date of death: 14 February 2019 (aged 75)
- Place of death: Leeds, England
- Position: Inside forward

Youth career
- Salts

Senior career*
Years	Team	Apps	(Gls)
1963–1965	Bradford City	48	(13)
1965–1966	Rotherham United	10	(3)
1966–1968	Darlington	9	(1)
1968–1969	Bradford Park Avenue	1	(0)
- Bromsgrove Rovers
Total		68	(17)
- * Club domestic league appearances and goals

John Rodney Hellawell (20 December 1943 – 14 February 2019) was an English professional footballer who played as an inside forward.

== Early and personal life ==
Born in Keighley, Hellawell attended St Bede's Grammar School. His older brother Mike was also a footballer, playing for England at international level.

== Career ==
After playing for Salts, Hellawell made 68 appearances in the Football League for Bradford City, Rotherham United, Darlington and Bradford Park Avenue. He later played non-league football with Bromsgrove Rovers.

== Later life and death ==
He died on 14 February 2019, aged 75.
