= Johnny Schofield =

English footballer

- Johnny Schofield

Personal information
- Full name: John Reginald Schofield
- Date of birth: 8 February 1931
- Place of birth: Atherstone, England
- Date of death: 1 November 2006 (aged 75)
- Place of death: Coventry, England
- Position: Goalkeeper

Senior career*
| Years | Team | Apps | (Gls) |
- Ansley Hall Colliery
- Grendon
| 194?–1950 | Nuneaton Borough | | |
| 1950–1966 | Birmingham City | 212 | (0) |
| 1966–1968 | Wrexham | 52 | (0) |
| 1967 | → Cork Hibernians (loan) | | |
| 1968–1969 | Atherstone Town | | |
| 1969–1970 | Bromsgrove Rovers | | |
| 1970–1972 | Tamworth | | |

Managerial career
- 1968–1969: Atherstone Town (player-manager)
- * Club domestic league appearances and goals

John Reginald Schofield (8 February 1931 – 1 November 2006) was an English footballer who played as a goalkeeper in the Football League for Birmingham City and Wrexham.

== Life and career ==
Schofield was born in Atherstone, Warwickshire, in 1931. He played football for Ansley Hall Colliery, Grendon and Nuneaton Borough before signing a professional contract with Birmingham City in February 1950, and spent the next decade as backup to Gil Merrick. In November 1957, he was injured in an explosion at Baddesley Colliery in Warwickshire, where he worked as a miner, and three years later, he fractured his skull while playing in goal against Manchester United. It was in 1959 that Schofield took over as Birmingham's first choice. He played on the losing side in two Inter-Cities Fairs Cup finals, against Barcelona in 1960 and Roma in 1961, and for the winners of the 1963 Football League Cup Final against city rivals Aston Villa.

With advancing age and the arrival of Jim Herriot, Schofield lost his place in the Birmingham team, and was transferred to Wrexham in 1966. He lost his place in late 1967, and spent a month on loan at Cork Hibernians of the League of Ireland. In 1968, he became player-manager of Atherstone Town, and also played for Bromsgrove Rovers and Tamworth, before returning to Atherstone as manager. In later life, he ran an off-licence in his home town of Atherstone.

Schofield was married to Grace née Finney; by 1963 the couple had two children. He died in Coventry on 1 November 2006 at the age of 75.

== Honours ==
Birmingham City

- Football League Second Division: 1954–55
- Football League Cup: 1962–63
- Inter-Cities Fairs Cup runner-up: 1959–60, 1960–61
