= Graham Sissons =

English footballer (1934–2026)

Personal information
- Full name: John Graham Sissons
- Date of birth: 20 May 1934
- Place of birth: Chester-le-Street, England
- Date of death: March 2026 (aged 91)
- Position: Defender

Youth career
- Country Girl

Senior career*
Years	Team	Apps	(Gls)
1954–1961	Birmingham City (Note: Some sources list Sissons with 90 League appearances, an error which possibly stems from Matthews (1995) mistakenly attributing an appearance in Birmingham's match against Blackburn Rovers in March 1961 to George Allen.)	91	(0)
1961–1964	Peterborough United	68	(0)
1964–1968	Walsall	98	(1)
1968–19??	Stourbridge		
- * Club domestic league appearances and goals

John Graham Sissons (20 May 1934 – March 2026) was an English footballer who played as a defender. He made more than 250 appearances in the Football League for Birmingham City, Peterborough United and Walsall, and played in both legs of the 1961 Inter-Cities Fairs Cup Final, which Birmingham lost to Roma. For Birmingham, he was used as Trevor Smith's deputy at centre half, and later replaced George Allen at left back. Sissons died in March 2026, at the age of 91.

== Honours ==
Birmingham City

- Inter-Cities Fairs Cup runner-up: 1960–61
