= Winston Foster =

English footballer

Personal information
- Full name: Winston Arthur Foster
- Date of birth: 1 November 1941 (age 84)
- Place of birth: Birmingham, England
- Height: 5 ft 10 1/2 in (1.79 m)
- Position: Defender

Youth career
- 1955–1958: Birmingham City

Senior career*
Years	Team	Apps	(Gls)
1958–1969	Birmingham City (Note: Some sources attribute Foster's appearance against Everton in April 1962 to Brian Farmer, who had left the club three months earlier.)	153	(2)
1969	→ Crewe Alexandra (loan)	13	(0)
1969–1971	Plymouth Argyle	33	(0)
1971–1972	Chelmsford City		
1972–1973	Bromsgrove Rovers		

Managerial career
- 1973–1974: Bromsgrove Rovers (assistant manager)
- * Club domestic league appearances and goals

Winston Arthur Foster (born 1 November 1941) is an English former professional footballer. He played more than 150 games in the top two divisions of the Football League for Birmingham City.

Born in South Yardley, Birmingham, Foster joined Birmingham City as a junior, making his first-team debut at the age of 19 as a full back. For the next three seasons he played occasionally for the first team either at full back or as Trevor Smith's deputy at centre-half, most notably in the first leg of the 1961 Inter-Cities Fairs Cup Final against A.S. Roma. When Smith sustained the injury that resulted in him leaving the club, Foster took over at centre half and kept his place for another couple of seasons. He was used less frequently in his last two years at the club, and spent three months on loan at Crewe Alexandra before making a permanent move to Plymouth Argyle where he ended his Football League career. He went on to play for Chelmsford City and Bromsgrove Rovers, and spent one season as Bromsgrove's assistant manager.

== Honours ==
Birmingham City

- Inter-Cities Fairs Cup runners-up: 1960–61
