= Paolo Pestrin =

Italian footballer

Personal information
- Date of birth: 9 July 1936
- Place of birth: San Giorgio di Nogaro, Italy
- Date of death: 27 July 2009 (aged 73)
- Height: 1.83 m (6 ft 0 in)
- Position: Midfielder

Senior career*
Years	Team	Apps	(Gls)
1953–1956	Genoa	62	(7)
1956–1963	Roma	196	(17)
1963–1965	Padova	59	(2)
1965–1967	Torino	10	(0)
1967–1970	Piacenza	104	(10)
1970–1971	Sestrese		
1971–1972	Sestri Levante	28	(0)
- * Club domestic league appearances and goals

Paolo Pestrin (9 July 1936 in San Giorgio di Nogaro – 27 July 2009) was an Italian professional footballer who played as a midfielder.

He played for 12 seasons (268 games, 24 goals) in the Italian Serie A for Genoa C.F.C., A.S. Roma and A.C. Torino, winning the 1960–61 Inter-Cities Fairs Cup with Roma, and scoring a goal in the 2–0 second leg final victory over Birmingham City.

His younger brother Settimo Pestrin also played football professionally. To distinguish them, Paolo was referred to as Pestrin I and Settimo as Pestrin II.

== Honours ==
Roma

- Inter-Cities Fairs Cup: 1960–61
