= 1960–61 Inter-Cities Fairs Cup =

Tournament details
- Dates: 13 September 1960 – 11 October 1961
- Teams: 16 (15 competed)

Final positions
- Champions: (Italy) Roma (1st title)
- Runners-up: (England) Birmingham City

Tournament statistics
- Matches played: 31
- Goals scored: 144 (4.65 per match)
- Top scorer(s): (Argentina) Pedro Manfredini (Roma); 12 goals

The third Inter-Cities Fairs Cup was the first to be played over a single season, namely the 1960–61 season. Birmingham City once again reached the final, but lost again over two legs, this time to Roma. Once again, a number of countries sent a representative team for one of their main cities.

== Teams location ==
Location of teams in the 1958–60 Inter-Cities Fairs Cup.

== Bracket ==
First round
(Italy) Inter Milan	8	6	14
(Germany) Hannover 96	2	1	3
(East Germany) Leipzig XI	5	1	6 (0)
(Socialist Federal Republic of Yugoslavia) Belgrade XI	2	4	6 (2)
(Denmark) KB	8	3	11
(Switzerland) Basel XI	1	3	4
(England) Birmingham City	3	2	5
(Hungary) Újpesti Dózsa	2	1	3
(Socialist Federal Republic of Yugoslavia) Zagreb XI	1	3	4
(Spain) Barcelona	1	4	5
(Scotland) Hibernian	—	—	w
(Switzerland) Lausanne-Sport	—	—	o
(France) Lyon	1	2	3
(Germany) Cologne XI	3	1	4
(Belgium) U. Saint-Gilloise	0	1	1
(Italy) Roma	0	4	4

Quarter-finals
(Italy) Inter Milan	5	0	5
(Socialist Federal Republic of Yugoslavia) Belgrade XI	0	1	1
(Denmark) KB	4	0	4
(England) Birmingham City	4	5	9
(Spain) Barcelona	4	2	6
(Scotland) Hibernian	4	3	7
(Germany) Cologne XI	0	2	2 (1)
(Italy) Roma	2	0	2 (4)

Semi-finals
(Italy) Inter Milan	1	1	2
(England) Birmingham City	2	2	4
(Scotland) Hibernian	2	3	5 (0)
(Italy) Roma	2	3	5 (6)

Final
(England) Birmingham City	2	0	2
(Italy) Roma	2	2	4

== First round ==
Team 1	Agg.	Team 2	1st leg	2nd leg
Inter Milan (Italy)	14–3	(West Germany) Hannover 96	8–2	6–1
Leipzig XI (East Germany)	6–6^{1}	(Socialist Federal Republic of Yugoslavia) Belgrade XI	5–2	1–4
KB (Denmark)	11–4	(Switzerland) Basel XI	8–1	3–3
Birmingham City (England)	5–3	(Hungary) Újpesti Dózsa	3–2	2–1
Zagreb XI (Socialist Federal Republic of Yugoslavia)	4–5	(Spain) Barcelona	1–1	3–4
Hibernian (Scotland)	(w/o)	(Switzerland) Lausanne-Sport	–	–
Lyon (France)	3–4	(West Germany) Cologne XI	1–3	2–1
Union Saint-Gilloise (Belgium)	1–4	(Italy) Roma	0–0	1–4

^{1} Belgrade XI progressed to the quarter-finals after beating Leipzig XI 2–0 in a play-off match.

=== First leg ===
13 September 1960

Inter Milan (Italy)	8–2	(West Germany) Hannover 96
Bicicli 21'; Zaglio 55'; Lindskog 63' (pen.) 73'; Corso 70' 76'; Firmani 79'; Angelillo 90'		Heiser 49'; Fischer 61'

San Siro, Milan

11 September 1960

Leipzig XI (East Germany)	5–2	(Socialist Federal Republic of Yugoslavia) Belgrade XI
Heydenreich 29', 38'; Frenzel 34'; Krause 76'; Trolitzsch 87'		Kovačević 33'; Mihajlović 73'

Bruno-Plache-Stadion, Leipzig

19 October 1960

KB (Denmark)	8–1	(Switzerland) Basel XI
Petersen 18', 44', 60'; Clausen 62'; J. Sørensen 72', 76', 86'; O. Sørensen 80'		Hügi II 34'

Idrætsparken, Copenhagen

16 October 1960

Birmingham City (England)	3–2	(Hungary) Újpesti Dózsa
Gordon 29', 83'; Astall 62'		Göröcs 15', 49'

St Andrew's, Birmingham

12 October 1960

Zagreb XI (Socialist Federal Republic of Yugoslavia)	1–1	(Spain) Barcelona
Gensana 61' (o.g.)		Villaverde 25'

Stadion Maksimir, Zagreb

12 October 1960

Lyon (France)	1–3	(West Germany) Cologne XI
Roubaud 4' (pen.)		Müller 55'; Rühl 70'; Schwier 76'

Stade de Gerland, Lyon

4 October 1960

Union Saint-Gilloise (Belgium)	0–0	(Italy) Roma

Stade Joseph Marien, Brussels

=== Second leg ===
5 October 1960

Hannover 96 (West Germany)	1–6	(Italy) Inter Milan
Heiser 4'		Angelillo 25'; Corso 40'; Lindskog 55'; Bicchierai 75'; Wieczorek 77' (o.g.); Firmani 85'

Niedersachsenstadion, Hannover

Inter Milan won 14–3 on aggregate.

19 October 1960

Barcelona (Spain)	4–3	(Socialist Federal Republic of Yugoslavia) Zagreb XI
Luis Suarez 29'; Martinez 53'; Gensana 65'; Czibor 72'		Lamza 18'; Marković 27'; Pašić 83'

Camp Nou, Barcelona

Barcelona FC won 5–4 on aggregate.

19 October 1960

Cologne XI (West Germany)	1–2	(France) Lyon
Sturm 20'		Gardon 67'; N'Jo Léa 80'

Müngersdorfer Stadion, Cologne

Cologne XI won 4–3 on aggregate.

19 October 1960

Belgrade XI (Socialist Federal Republic of Yugoslavia)	4–1	(East Germany) Leipzig XI
Tasić 12'; Mihajlović 60', 90'; Prljinčević 73' (pen.)		Stiller 24'

Omladinski Stadium, Belgrade

Belgrade XI 6-6 Leipzig XI on aggregate.

9 November 1960

Belgrade XI (Socialist Federal Republic of Yugoslavia)	2–0	(East Germany) Leipzig XI
Skoblar 10'; Kostić 49'

Megyeri úti Stadium, Budapest
Referee: Ferdinand Marschall (Austria)

Belgrade XI won 2–0 in play-off.

26 October 1960

Basel XI (Switzerland)	3–3	(Denmark) KB
Hügi II 11'; Siedl 28'; Kirchhofer 49'		Ravn 44', 79'; O. Sørensen 45'

St. Jakob Stadium, Basel

KB won 11–4 on aggregate.

26 October 1960

Újpesti Dósza (Hungary)	1–2	(England) Birmingham City
Szusza 63'		Rudd 87'; Singer 90'

Megyeri úti Stadium, Budapest

Birmingham City won 5–3 on aggregate.

1 November 1960

Roma (Italy)	4–1	(Belgium) Union Saint-Gilloise
Giuliano 6'; Menichelli 21'; Manfredini 39'; Lojacono 76'		Dirickx 81' (pen.)

Stadio Olimpico, Rome

Roma won 4–1 on aggregate.

== Quarter-finals ==
Team 1	Agg.	Team 2	1st leg	2nd leg
Inter Milan (Italy)	5–1	(Socialist Federal Republic of Yugoslavia) Belgrade XI	5–0	0–1
KB (Denmark)	4–9	(England) Birmingham City	4–4	0–5
Barcelona (Spain)	6–7	(Scotland) Hibernian	4–4	2–3
Cologne XI (West Germany)	2–2^{1}	(Italy) Roma	0–2	2–0

^{1} Roma progressed to the semi-finals after beating Cologne XI 4–1 in a play-off match.

=== First leg ===
1 March 1961

Inter Milan (Italy)	5–0	(Socialist Federal Republic of Yugoslavia) Belgrade XI
Morbello 8'; Bicicli 51', 80'; Firmani 74', 87'

San Siro, Milan

23 November 1960

KB (Denmark)	4–4	(England) Birmingham City
Ravn 34'; Clausen 65', 79'; Torstensen 84'		Gordon 36', 57'; Singer 49', 61'

Idrætsparken, Copenhagen

27 December 1960

Barcelona (Spain)	4–4	(Scotland) Hibernian
Kocsis 36', 53', 83'; Evaristo 89'		Baker 7', 74'; MacLeod 18'; Preston 72'

Camp Nou, Barcelona

18 January 1961

Cologne XI (West Germany)	0–2	(Italy) Roma
		Manfredini 51'; Stollenwerk 70' (o.g.)

Müngersdorfer Stadion, Cologne

=== Second leg ===
8 March 1961

Belgrade XI (Socialist Federal Republic of Yugoslavia)	1–0	(Italy) Inter Milan
Skoblar 54'

Omladinski Stadium, Belgrade

Inter Milan won 5–1 on aggregate.

7 December 1960

Birmingham City (England)	5–0	(Denmark) KB
Stubbs 4', 67'; Harris 48'; Hellawell 50'; Bloomfield 53'

St Andrew's, Birmingham

Birmingham City won 9–4 on aggregate.

22 February 1961

Hibernian (Scotland)	3–2	(Spain) Barcelona
Baker 10'; Preston 74'; Kinloch 85' (pen.)		Martinez 29'; Kocsis 44'

Easter Road, Edinburgh

Hibernian won 7–6 on aggregate.

8 February 1961

Roma (Italy)	0–2	(West Germany) Cologne XI
		Kremer 58'; Schnellinger 82'

Stadio Olimpico, Rome

Roma 2–2 Cologne XI on aggregate.

1 March 1961

Roma (Italy)	4–1	(West Germany) Cologne XI
Manfredini 42', 70'; Lojacono 60'; Pestrin 71'		Müller 84'

Stadio Olimpico, Rome

Roma won 4–1 in play-off.

== Semi-finals ==
Team 1	Agg.	Team 2	1st leg	2nd leg
Inter Milan (Italy)	2–4	(England) Birmingham City	1–2	1–2
Hibernian (Scotland)	5–5^{1}	(Italy) Roma	2–2	3–3

^{1} Roma progressed to the final after beating Hibernian 6–0 in a play-off match.

=== First leg ===
19 April 1961

Inter Milan (Italy)	1–2	(England) Birmingham City
Firmani 67'		Harris 12'; Balleri 41' (o.g.)

San Siro, Milan

19 April 1961

Hibernian (Scotland)	2–2	(Italy) Roma
Baker 47'; MacLeod 82'		Lojacono 14', 63'

Easter Road, Edinburgh

=== Second leg ===
3 May 1961

Birmingham City (England)	2–1	(Italy) Inter Milan
Harris 4', 62'		Masiero 66'

St Andrew's, Birmingham

Birmingham City won 4–2 on aggregate.

26 April 1961

Roma (Italy)	3–3	(Scotland) Hibernian
Manfredini 23', 67'; Lojacono 72'		Kinloch 31'; Baker 60', 63'

Stadio Olimpico, Rome

Roma 5–5 Hibernian on aggregate.

27 May 1961

Roma (Italy)	6–0	(Scotland) Hibernian
Manfredini 1', 9', 35', 57'; Menichelli 69'; Selmosson 72'

Stadio Olimpico, Rome

Roma won 6–0 in play-off.

== Final ==
=== First leg ===
27 September 1961

Birmingham City (England)	2–2	(Italy) Roma
Hellawell 78'; Orritt 85'		Manfredini 30', 56'

St Andrew's, Birmingham
Attendance: 21,005
Referee: Bob Davidson (Scotland)

=== Second leg ===
11 October 1961

Roma (Italy)	2–0	(England) Birmingham City
Farmer 56' (o.g.); Pestrin 90'

Stadio Olimpico, Rome
Attendance: 60,000
Referee: Pierre Schwinte (France)

Roma won 4–2 on aggregate.
