= Dick Neal Jr. =

English footballer (1933–2013)

Dick Neal
Personal information
- Full name: Richard Marshall Neal
- Date of birth: 1 October 1933
- Place of birth: Dinnington, England
- Date of death: 21 February 2013 (aged 79)
- Place of death: Penkridge, England
- Height: 6 ft 1 in (1.85 m)
- Position: Wing half

Youth career
- Dinnington Miners Welfare
- 1948–1949: Wath Wanderers
- 1949–1951: Wolverhampton Wanderers

Senior career*
Years	Team	Apps	(Gls)
1951–1954	Wolverhampton Wanderers	0	(0)
1954–1957	Lincoln City	115	(11)
1957–1961	Birmingham City	165	(15)
1961–1963	Middlesbrough	33	(4)
1963–1964	Lincoln City	41	(4)
1964–1965	Rugby Town		
1965–1967	Hednesford Town		
1967–1968	Brierley Hill Alliance		
1968–1969	Blakenall		

International career
1956–1957	England U23	4	(0)

Managerial career
- 1965–1967: Hednesford Town (player-manager)
- 1967–1968: Brierley Hill Alliance (player-manager)
- 1968–1969: Blakenall (player-manager)
- * Club domestic league appearances and goals

Richard Marshall Neal (1 October 1933 – 21 February 2013) was an English professional footballer who played as a wing half. He made more than 350 appearances in the Football League, played for Birmingham City in the 1960 Inter-Cities Fairs Cup Final, and won four caps for the England under-23 team.

== Life and career ==
Neal was born in Dinnington, which was then in the West Riding of Yorkshire, and attended Dinnington Senior Boys' School. He came through Wolverhampton Wanderers' nursery club, Wath Wanderers, and then joined the junior ranks at the club. He turned professional in 1951, but failed to break through to the first team. In 1954, he moved to Second Division club Lincoln City, where he played more than 100 league games. While at Lincoln he was first capped for England under-23, and remains the only player to represent England above youth level while at the club. Financial difficulties caused in part by falling attendances forced Lincoln to accept the substantial offer of £15,000 plus player Bert Linnecor from First Division club Birmingham City, and in April 1957 Neal moved on.

He was a powerful player, both strong in the tackle and capable of positive attacking play; manager Arthur Turner brought him in as a replacement for Len Boyd, who had retired through injury after the 1956 FA Cup Final. He made nearly 200 appearances in all competitions for Birmingham, including 165 top-flight League matches and the 1960 Fairs Cup Final, and captained the side in 1960–61.

The next season, he lost his place to Terry Hennessey, so moved to Middlesbrough, where injury restricted his appearances during the two seasons he spent there. He returned to Lincoln, now in the Fourth Division, as captain for another year. He went on to try his hand at management, as player-manager of several non-league clubs in the Staffordshire area, before going into the licensed trade. He ran a pub in Penkridge for nearly 20 years.

In 2006, to celebrate their centenary in the Football League, Lincoln City fans voted for "100 League Legends", those 100 players who had represented the club with most distinction; Neal came in at number 42.

Neal was married to Barbara and had three children, Debbie, Richard and Tim. He died in 2013 at the age of 79. His father, Dick Neal Sr., was a professional footballer who played as a winger for Blackpool, Derby County, Southampton, Bristol City and Accrington Stanley before the Second World War.
