= Jimmy Singer =

Welsh footballer

Personal information
- Full name: Dennis James Singer
- Date of birth: 30 August 1937
- Place of birth: Cefn Hengoed, Wales
- Date of death: 21 July 2010 (aged 72)
- Position: Inside forward

Youth career
- Wesley Rovers B.C.

Senior career*
Years	Team	Apps	(Gls)
- Fleur-de-Lys Welfare
1954–1960	Newport County	52	(27)
1960–1962	Birmingham City	20	(8)
1962–1964	Bournemouth & Boscombe Athletic	59	(22)
1964–1965	Newport County	8	(5)
- * Club domestic league appearances and goals

Dennis James Singer (30 August 1937 – 21 July 2010) was a Welsh professional footballer who scored 62 goals in 139 appearances in the Football League playing for Newport County, Birmingham City and Bournemouth & Boscombe Athletic. He played as an inside forward.

Singer was born in Cefn Hengoed, Glamorgan. As a boy he played for Wesley Rovers Boys' Club, which fed Fleur-de-Lys Welfare, and from there he joined Newport County as an amateur in 1954. He turned professional in 1956, and went on to score 27 goals for the club at a rate better than a goal every two games, goal-poaching which earned him a move to First Division club Birmingham City. Singer spent two seasons with Birmingham, but played only 31 games in all competitions despite scoring as freely as at Newport. He played on the losing side in the 1961 Inter-Cities Fairs Cup Final against Roma. In September 1962, Singer signed for Bournemouth & Boscombe Athletic for a fee of £7,000; he scored 22 goals in 59 league games before returning to Newport County in the 1964 close season.

After his retirement from football, Singer kept a restaurant in Caerleon. He died in July 2010.
