= Robin Stubbs =

English footballer (1941–2026)

Personal information
- Full name: Robin Gregory Stubbs
- Date of birth: 22 April 1941
- Place of birth: Quinton, Birmingham, England
- Date of death: 23 October 2026 (aged 85)
- Position: Centre forward

Youth career
- 1956–1958: Birmingham City

Senior career*
Years	Team	Apps	(Gls)
1958–1963	Birmingham City	61	(17)
1963–1969	Torquay United	217	(120)
1969–1972	Bristol Rovers	93	(32)
1972–1974	Torquay United	21	(1)
Total		392	(170)
- * Club domestic league appearances and goals

Robin Gregory Stubbs (22 April 1941 – 23 October 2026) was an English professional footballer who played as a centre forward. He made nearly 400 appearances and scored 170 goals in the Football League playing for Birmingham City, Torquay United (in two separate spells) and Bristol Rovers.

While with Birmingham, Stubbs played in the early rounds of their 1958–60 and 1960–61 campaigns in the Inter-Cities Fairs Cup, but not in either final. At the age of 22 he joined Torquay for what was then their club record fee of £6,000. Over the following six seasons he scored at a rate of better than a goal every two games, and was the Torquay fans' choice in the 2007 PFA Fans' Favourites poll.

Stubbs was born in Quinton, Birmingham. He was formerly married to Anthea Redfern, who went on to marry Bruce Forsyth and assist him on the BBC game-show The Generation Game.

In January 2020 Torquay United announced that the board of directors had appointed Stubbs as an Honorary Life President of the club.

Stubbs died on 23 October 2026. He was 85.
