= Billy Rudd =

English footballer

Personal information
- Full name: William Thomas Rudd
- Date of birth: 13 December 1941 (age 84)
- Place of birth: Manchester, England
- Position: Midfielder

Senior career*
Years	Team	Apps	(Gls)
–	Stalybridge Celtic		
1959–1961	Birmingham City	24	(3)
1961–1966	York City	193	(30)
1966–1968	Grimsby Town	60	(9)
1968–1970	Rochdale	108	(8)
1970–1977	Bury	189	(19)
1976	Cork Hibernians	2	(0)
- * Club domestic league appearances and goals

William Thomas Rudd (born 13 December 1941) is an English former footballer who made 574 appearances in the Football League playing for Birmingham City, York City, Grimsby Town, Rochdale and Bury.
