= Brian Farmer =

English footballer

Personal information
- Full name: Frederick Brian Webb Farmer
- Date of birth: 29 July 1933
- Place of birth: Wordsley, England
- Date of death: 1 June 2014 (aged 80)
- Position: Right back

Youth career
- 1949–1950: Stourbridge
- 1950–1954: Birmingham City

Senior career*
Years	Team	Apps	(Gls)
1954–1962	Birmingham City	117	(0)
1962–1965	Bournemouth & Boscombe Athletic	132	(0)
Total		249	(0)
- * Club domestic league appearances and goals

Frederick Brian Webb Farmer (29 July 1933 – 1 June 2014) was an English professional footballer who made 249 appearances in the Football League for Birmingham City and Bournemouth & Boscombe Athletic. He played at right back.

Born in Wordsley, Staffordshire, Farmer joined Birmingham City in 1950 as an amateur when he was 17. He turned professional in 1954 and made his first-team debut in 1956, but was used only as cover when Jeff Hall or Ken Green were injured or on international duty. He became a first-team regular following Hall's death in 1959, but lost his place to new signing Stan Lynn some two and a half years later. He left the club in January 1962 having made 145 appearances in all competitions, of which 117 were in the First Division. (Note: Some sources attribute Winston Foster's appearance against Everton in April 1962 to Farmer, who had left the club three months earlier.) He also played 17 games in European competition, appearing in the 1960 and 1961 finals of the Inter-Cities Fairs Cup. He went on to play 132 league games for Bournemouth & Boscombe Athletic, including playing many games as team captain. He later worked as a scout for Aston Villa and AFC Bournemouth.

Farmer died in hospital on 1 June 2014 at the age of 80.
