= Bryan Orritt =

Welsh footballer

Personal information
- Full name: Bryan Orritt
- Date of birth: 22 February 1937
- Place of birth: Caernarfon, Wales
- Date of death: 24 March 2014 (aged 77)
- Place of death: Johannesburg, South Africa
- Height: 5 ft 9 in (1.75 m)
- Positions: Inside forward; wing half

Youth career
- –: Llanfair PG

Senior career*
| Years | Team | Apps | (Gls) |
| 1954–1956 | Bangor City | 52 | (13) |
| 1956–1962 | Birmingham City | 99 | (23) |
| 1962–1966 | Middlesbrough | 118 | (22) |
| 1966–1967 | Southern Suburbs | 54 | (12) |
| 1968–1969 | Durban United | 35 | (11) |
| 1969–1970 | Johannesburg Rangers | 16 | (3) |
| 1970 | Southern Suburbs | 17 | (3) |
| 1971–1974 | Berea Park | | |

International career
| 1958–1959 | Wales U-23 | 3 | (1) |
- * Club domestic league appearances and goals

Bryan Orritt (22 February 1937 – 24 March 2014) was a Welsh professional footballer who played as an inside forward or wing half. He made more than 200 appearances in the Football League, and was capped three times for Wales at under-23 level.

Born in Caernarfon, Orritt began his football career with local club Llanfair PG before joining Bangor City. In 1956 he joined English First Division club Birmingham City, for whom he went on to play in the finals of the 1960 and 1961 Inter-Cities Fairs Cups, becoming one of the first Welsh footballers to take part in European competition.

In 1962 he moved to Middlesbrough, and became the first substitute ever used by the club.

He emigrated to South Africa, playing for and later managing Southern Suburbs F.C.

Orritt died in a Johannesburg nursing home on 24 March 2014 at the age of 77.
