= Jimmy Harris (footballer, born 1933) =

English footballer (1933–2022)

Personal information
- Full name: James Harris
- Date of birth: 18 August 1933
- Place of birth: Birkenhead, England
- Date of death: April 2022 (aged 88)
- Position: Centre forward

Youth career
- 1948–1951: Everton

Senior career*
Years	Team	Apps	(Gls)
1951–1960	Everton	191	(65)
1960–1964	Birmingham City	93	(37)
1964–1966	Oldham Athletic	29	(9)
1966	Tranmere Rovers	0	(0)
1966	Rhyl		
1966–1967	St Patrick's Athletic	6	(2)
1967–?	Ellesmere Port Town		

International career
1956	England U23	1	(1)
- * Club domestic league appearances and goals

James Harris (18 August 1933 – April 2022) was an English professional footballer who played as a centre forward for Everton and Birmingham City in the First Division. The strengths of his game were his pace and a clear eye for goal.

== Biography ==
Harris made his debut for Everton, replacing Dave Hickson, in 1955 and finished his debut season as the club's top scorer with 21 goals in all competitions. He was also capped for England under-23 that season, scoring in a 3–1 win against Scotland under-23 at Hillsborough in February 1956. When moved to outside right on Hickson's return in 1957 he was able to use his pace and still kept scoring. The following season, 1957–58, he scored a hat-trick away at Tottenham Hotspur only for Everton to lose 10–4.

In 1960, having scored 72 goals in 207 appearances in all competitions for Everton, Harris was sold to Birmingham City for a fee of £20,000. He was the club's top scorer in each of his first two seasons at Birmingham City, and in four years scored 53 goals in 113 games in all competitions. He played in their 1960–61 Inter-Cities Fairs Cup campaign when they reached the final against Roma, and was largely responsible for them getting that far. In the semi-final against Inter Milan he scored three times, including the first goal of the 2–1 win at the San Siro, the only time Inter had lost at home to an English club until Arsenal repeated the feat over forty years later. He won his only major medal when he played on the winning side in the 1963 Football League Cup Final.

After leaving Birmingham he moved on to Third Division club Oldham Athletic, and played once in the League Cup for Tranmere Rovers of the Fourth Division. He signed for Cheshire League club Rhyl in September 1966, but injury delayed his debut, and, after reportedly agreeing a deal with struggling Irish club Sligo Rovers, Harris signed instead for St Patrick's Athletic on 19 October. and made his debut that night in a League of Ireland Shield game against Shamrock Rovers. In his second Shield game he got his first goal for Pats which sealed the club's participation in the following season's Inter-Cities Fairs Cup. He made his League of Ireland debut on the opening day of the 1966–67 season at Waterford. His first league goal came in November against Dundalk. In three months at Richmond Park, Harris scored three goals in eight total appearances. He returned to the Cheshire League in February 1967 with Ellesmere Port Town, where he was later appointed player-manager.

Harris married Joan Boardman in 1967. His death was reported on 17 April 2022.

== Honours ==
Birmingham City

- Football League Cup: 1962–63
- Inter-Cities Fairs Cup runner-up: 1960–61

Individual

- Everton top scorer: 1956
- Birmingham City top scorer: 1961, 1962
