= 1961–62 Aston Villa F.C. season =

English football club season

Aston Villa
1961–62 season
- Chairman: Chris Buckley
- Manager: Joe Mercer
- Stadium: Villa Park
- First Division: 7th
- FA Cup: Sixth round
- League Cup: Runner-up

Second City Derby
- 27--18--22

The 1961–62 English football season was Aston Villa's 63rd season in The Football League. Villa played in the First Division.

In the Second City derby both teams won their away fixtures.

Winning the 1961 Football League Cup Final was the pinnacle for Villa. They finished seventh in 1961–62, the following season saw the beginning of a decline in form.

There were debuts for Derek Dougan (51), Tommy Ewing (39), Ken Fencott (3), Wilson Briggs (2), Allan Jones (1), and Ralph Brown. Lew Chatterley who began his career as an apprentice at Aston Villa, turned professional this season, with his league debut coming the following season. He remained at Villa Park for over 9 years, making 153 league appearances and scoring 26 goals.

Derek Dougan joined Villa in July 1961 for a fee of £15,000. The 23-year-old was signed by manager Joe Mercer as a replacement for Gerry Hitchens, who had been sold on to Inter Milan earlier in the summer for £85,000. Teammate Peter McParland later commented that "when Derek came to us at Aston Villa I think it was at a time when he was not taking the game particularly seriously". After returning from watching his "Villans" teammates win the 1961 League Cup Final at Villa Park on 5 September, Dougan was a passenger in a car accident which killed fellow passenger Malcolm Williams and left Dougan with a broken arm and head injuries; driver and teammate Bobby Thomson was charged but found 'Not Guilty' of careless driving. In November 2010 – three years after Dougan's death, Thomson claimed that Dougan had drunkenly pulled a deerstalker hat over his eyes, causing him to crash the car. Dougan recovered after three months on the sidelines and ended the 1961–62 season with 12 goals in 27 matches.

== First Division ==
Pos	Team	Pld	W	D	L	GF	GA	GAv	Pts
5	Sheffield United	42	19	9	14	61	69	0.884	47
6	Sheffield Wednesday	42	20	6	16	72	58	1.241	46
7	Aston Villa	42	18	8	16	65	56	1.161	44
8	West Ham United	42	17	10	15	76	82	0.927	44
9	West Bromwich Albion	42	15	13	14	83	67	1.239	43

Source: World Football
Rules for classification: 1) Points; 2) Goal average; 3) Goals scored

=== Matches ===
19 August 1961	Everton	2–0	Aston Villa	Liverpool
		Report		Stadium: Goodison Park

26 August 1961	Aston Villa	3–1	Chelsea	Birmingham
	Bobby Thomson, Harry Burrows, Jimmy MacEwan	Report		Stadium: Villa Park

28 August 1961	Wolves	2–2	Aston Villa	Wolverhampton
		Report	Derek Dougan (2)	Stadium: Molineux Stadium

2 September 1961	Sheffield United	0–2	Aston Villa	Sheffield
		Report	Harry Burrows, Derek Dougan	Stadium: Bramall Lane

9 September 1961	Aston Villa	2–4	West Ham United	Birmingham
	Vic Crowe, Peter McParland	Report		Stadium: Villa Park

16 September 1961	Blackburn Rovers	4–2	Aston Villa	Blackburn
		Report	Mike Tindall, Harry Burrows	Stadium: Ewood Park

18 September 1961	Aston Villa	1–1	Manchester United	Birmingham
	Peter McParland	Report		Stadium: Villa Park

23 September 1961	Aston Villa	5–0	Blackpool	Birmingham
	Harry Burrows (2), Peter McParland (3)	Report		Stadium: Villa Park

30 September 1961	Tottenham Hotspur	1–0	Aston Villa	London
		Report		Stadium: White Hart Lane

2 October 1961	Aston Villa	1–0	Wolves	Birmingham
	Jimmy MacEwan	Report		Stadium: Villa Park

7 October 1961	Fulham	3–1	Aston Villa	London
		Report	Jimmy MacEwan	Stadium: Craven Cottage

16 October 1961	Aston Villa	1–0	Sheffield Wednesday	Birmingham
	Peter McParland	Report		Stadium: Villa Park

21 October 1961	West Bromwich Albion	1–1	Aston Villa	West Bromwich
		Report	Own goal	Stadium: The Hawthorns

28 October 1961	Aston Villa	1–3	Birmingham City	Birmingham
	Peter McParland	Report		Stadium: Villa Park

4 November 1961	Burnley	3–0	Aston Villa	Burnley
		Report		Stadium: Turf Moor

11 November 1961	Aston Villa	3–1	Arsenal	Birmingham
	Harry Burrows, Peter McParland, Bobby Thomson	Report		Stadium: Villa Park

18 November 1961	Bolton Wanderers	1–1	Aston Villa	Bolton
		Report	Bobby Thomson	Stadium: Burnden Park

25 November 1961	Aston Villa	2–1	Manchester City	Birmingham
	Harry Burrows, Peter McParland	Report		Stadium: Villa Park

2 December 1961	Leicester City	0–2	Aston Villa	Leicester
		Report	Ron Wylie, Derek Dougan	Stadium: Filbert Street

9 December 1961	Aston Villa	3–0	Ipswich Town	Birmingham
	Peter McParland (2), Bobby Thomson	Report		Stadium: Villa Park

16 December 1961	Aston Villa	1–1	Everton	Birmingham
	Bobby Thomson	Report		Stadium: Villa Park

23 December 1961	Chelsea	1–0	Aston Villa	London
		Report		Stadium: Stamford Bridge

26 December 1961	Cardiff City	1–0	Aston Villa	Cardiff
		Report		Stadium: Ninian Park

13 January 1962	Aston Villa	0–0	Sheffield United	Birmingham
		Report		Stadium: Villa Park

15 January 1962	Manchester United	2–0	Aston Villa	Manchester
		Report		Stadium: Old Trafford

20 January 1962	West Ham United	2–0	Aston Villa	London
		Report		Stadium: Boleyn Ground

3 February 1962	Aston Villa	1–0	Blackburn Rovers	Birmingham
	Derek Dougan	Report		Stadium: Villa Park

10 February 1962	Blackpool	1–2	Aston Villa	Blackpool
		Report	Jimmy MacEwan, Jimmy McMorran	Stadium: Bloomfield Road

21 February 1962	Aston Villa	0–0	Tottenham Hotspur	Birmingham
		Report		Stadium: Villa Park

24 February 1962	Aston Villa	2–0	Fulham	Birmingham
	Jimmy MacEwan, Harry Burrows	Report		Stadium: Villa Park

3 March 1962	Sheffield Wednesday	3–0	Aston Villa	Sheffield
		Report		Stadium: Hillsborough Stadium

14 March 1962	Aston Villa	1–0	West Bromwich Albion	Birmingham
	Harry Burrows	Report		Stadium: Villa Park

17 March 1962	Birmingham City	0–2	Aston Villa	Birmingham
		Report	Harry Burrows, Ron Wylie	Stadium: St Andrew's Stadium

24 March 1962	Aston Villa	0–2	Burnley	Birmingham
		Report		Stadium: Villa Park

31 March 1962	Arsenal	4–5	Aston Villa	London
		Report	Bobby Thomson (2), Derek Dougan, Vic Crowe, Tommy Ewing	Stadium: Highbury

7 April 1962	Aston Villa	3–0	Bolton Wanderers	Birmingham
	Tommy Ewing, Bobby Thomson, Derek Dougan	Report		Stadium: Villa Park

14 April 1962	Manchester City	1–0	Aston Villa	Manchester
		Report		Stadium: Maine Road

21 April 1962	Aston Villa	8–3	Leicester City	Birmingham
	Bobby Thomson (3), Derek Dougan (2), Own goal, Alan Baker, Harry Burrows	Report		Stadium: Villa Park

23 April 1962	Aston Villa	5–1	Nottingham Forest	Birmingham
	Harry Burrows (2), Bobby Thomson, Tommy Ewing, Own goal	Report		Stadium: Villa Park

24 April 1962	Nottingham Forest	2–0	Aston Villa	Nottingham
		Report		Stadium: City Ground

28 April 1962	Ipswich Town	2–0	Aston Villa	Ipswich
		Report		Stadium: Portman Road
Note: After the match, Ipswich learn they are Champions

1 May 1962	Aston Villa	2–2	Cardiff City	Birmingham
	Own goal, Derek Dougan	Report		Stadium: Villa Park

== FA Cup ==
=== Third round ===
The 44 First and Second Division clubs entered the competition at this stage. The matches were scheduled for 6 January 1962, with seven matches postponed until later dates. Ten matches were drawn and went to replays, with two of these requiring a second replay.

Tie no	Home team	Score	Away team	Date
10	Aston Villa	4–3	Crystal Palace	6 January 1962

=== Fourth round ===
The matches were scheduled for 27 January 1962, with three Lancashire-based games postponed until the midweek fixtures. Five matches were drawn and went to replays, which were all played in the following midweek match. Weymouth was the last non-league club left in the competition.

Tie no	Home team	Score	Away team	Date
4	Aston Villa	2–1	Huddersfield Town	27 January 1962

=== Fifth round ===
The matches were scheduled for 17 February 1962. Two matches went to replays in the following mid-week fixtures, with the Liverpool–Preston North End game requiring a second replay (at Old Trafford) before the tie was settled.

Tie no	Home team	Score	Away team	Date
4	Aston Villa	2–1	Charlton Athletic	17 February 1962

=== Sixth round ===
The four quarter-final ties were scheduled to be played on 10 March 1962. Two matches went to replays on the 14th before being settled.

Tie no	Home team	Score	Away team	Date
3	Tottenham Hotspur	2–0	Aston Villa	10 March 1962

== League Cup ==
=== 1961 League Cup final second leg ===
5 September 1961

Aston Villa	3 – 0 (a.e.t.)	Rotherham United
O'Neill 67'; Burrows 69'; McParland 109'

Villa Park, Birmingham
Attendance: 31,202
Referee: C.W. Kingston

Aston Villa	Rotherham United

1	(England) Geoff Sidebottom
2	(England) John Neal
3	(England) Gordon Lee
4	(Wales) Vic Crowe (c)
5	(England) Jimmy Dugdale
6	(England) Alan Deakin
7	(Scotland) Jimmy MacEwan
8	(England) Alan O'Neill
9	(Northern Ireland) Peter McParland
10	(Scotland) Bobby Thomson
11	(England) Harry Burrows
Manager:
(England) Joe Mercer

1	(England) Roy Ironside
2	(England) Peter Perry
3	(England) Lol Morgan
4	(England) Roy Lambert (c)
5	(England) Peter Madden
6	(England) Ken Waterhouse
7	(England) Barry Webster
8	(England) Don Weston
9	(England) Ken Houghton
10	(England) Alan Kirkman
11	(England) Keith Bambridge
Manager:
(Scotland) Tom Johnston

=== 1961–62 League Cup ===
==== First round ====
Home team	Score	Away team	Date
Bradford City (4)	3–4	Aston Villa (1)	13-09-1961

==== Second round ====
Home team	Score	Away team	Date
West Ham United (1)	1–3	Aston Villa (1)	09-10-1961

==== Third round ====
Home team	Score	Away team	Date
Aston Villa (1)	2–3	Ipswich Town (1)	21-11-1961
