= 1960–61 Aston Villa F.C. season =

English football club season

Aston Villa
1960–61 season
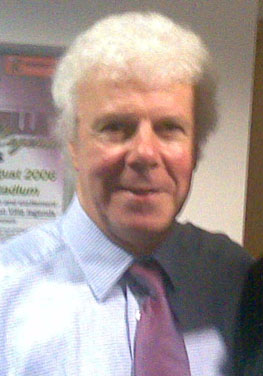
- Charlie Aitken's debut season
- Chairman: Chris Buckley
- Manager: Joe Mercer
- Stadium: Villa Park
- First Division: 10th
- FA Cup: Fifth round
- League Cup: Winners

The 1960–61 English football season was Aston Villa's 62nd season in The Football League. Villa played in the First Division.

In the Second City derby Aston Villa beat Birmingham City 6–2 at Villa Park, Peter McParland, Gerry Hitchens(3), and Alan O’Neill(2) scoring for Villa. The away fixture was drawn 1-1.

There were debuts for Charlie Aitken (561), John Sleeuwenhoek (226), Alan Baker (92), Geoff Sidebottom (70), Alan O'Neill (23), Fred Potter (6), Jimmy McMorran (14), Alfie Hale (5) and Mike Kenning (3).

== League Cup ==
The League Cup was a knockout competition for England's top 92 football clubs introduced to provide a new source of income. The 1960–61 Football League Cup was the inaugural season. Five League teams did not compete (Arsenal, Tottenham Hotspur, Sheffield Wednesday, West Bromwich Albion and Wolverhampton Wanderers). Despite an initial lack of enthusiasm on the part of some other big clubs, the competition became firmly established in the footballing calendar.

Villa received a bye to the second round and, on 12 October, beat Huddersfield Town 4–1 at home before a crowd of 17,057. On 15 Nov 1960 7,677 watched Preston North End draw 3–3 with travelling Villa. The Villains won the home replay 3–1 in front of 15,000.

The competition ended with the two-legged final almost a year later on 22 August and 5 September 1961. Villa beat Rotherham United 3–2 on aggregate after extra time. Rotherham won the first leg 2–0 at Millmoor, their home ground thanks to goals from Alan Kirkman and Barry Webster. In the second leg at Villa Park, Harry Burrows and Peter McParland levelled the tie on aggregate and Alan O'Neill scored in extra-time to win the cup.

Date	Opponent	Venue	Result	Notes	Scorers
12 Oct 1960	Huddersfield	Villa Park	4–1 W	2nd Round	Gerry Hitchens 19'; Ron Wylie 27', 55'; Harry Burrows 78'
15 Nov 1960	Preston	Deepdale	3–3 D	3rd Round	Alan O’Neill 5'; Gerry Hitchens 40'; Bobby Thomson 85'
23 Nov 1960	Preston	Villa Park	3–1 W	3rd Round replay	Gerry Hitchens 30'; Ron Wylie 58'; Jimmy MacEwan 82'
13 Dec 1960	Plymouth	Villa Park	3–3 D	4th Round	Peter McParland 48', 56'; Jimmy MacEwan 70'
19 Dec 1960	Plymouth	Home Park	0–0 D	4th Round replay	—
6 Feb 1961	Plymouth	Home Park	5–3 W	4th Round 2nd replay	Harry Burrows 45'; Alan O’Neill 59'; Gerry Hitchens 63', 70', 88'
22 Feb 1961	Wrexham	Villa Park	3–0 W	Quarter-final	Bobby Thomson 61'; Gerry Hitchens 67', 77'
10 Apr 1961	Burnley	Turf Moor	1–1 D	Semi-final	Gerry Hitchens 35'
26 Apr 1961	Burnley	Villa Park	2–2 D	Semi-final replay	Gerry Hitchens 14'; Bobby Thomson 21'
2 May 1961	Burnley	Old Trafford	2–1 W	Semi-final 2nd replay	Stan Lynn 69' (pen); Gerry Hitchens 87'

=== Final ===
The 1961 League Cup Final was played on 22 August and 5 September 1961 and was contested between First Division side Aston Villa and Second Division team Rotherham United. Aston Villa won the game 3–2 on aggregate (after extra time).

==== First leg ====
22 August 1961

Rotherham United	2–0	Aston Villa
Webster 51'; Kirkman 55'

Millmoor, Rotherham
Attendance: 12,226
Referee: K.A. Collinge

Rotherham United	Aston Villa

1	(England) Roy Ironside
2	(England) Peter Perry
3	(England) Lol Morgan
4	(England) Roy Lambert (c)
5	(England) Peter Madden
6	(England) Ken Waterhouse
7	(England) Barry Webster
8	(England) Don Weston
9	(England) Ken Houghton
10	(England) Alan Kirkman
11	(England) Keith Bambridge
Manager:
(Scotland) Tom Johnston

1	(England) Nigel Sims
2	(England) Stan Lynn
3	(England) Gordon Lee
4	(Wales) Vic Crowe (c)
5	(England) Jimmy Dugdale
6	(England) Alan Deakin
7	(Scotland) Jimmy MacEwan
8	(Scotland) Bobby Thomson
9	(England) Ralph Brown
10	(Scotland) Ron Wylie
11	(Northern Ireland) Peter McParland
Manager:
(England) Joe Mercer

==== Second leg ====
5 September 1961

Aston Villa	3–0 (a.e.t.)	Rotherham United
O'Neill 67'; Burrows 69'; McParland 109'

Villa Park, Birmingham
Attendance: 31,202
Referee: C.W. Kingston

Aston Villa	Rotherham United

1	(England) Geoff Sidebottom
2	(England) John Neal
3	(England) Gordon Lee
4	(Wales) Vic Crowe (c)
5	(England) Jimmy Dugdale
6	(England) Alan Deakin
7	(Scotland) Jimmy MacEwan
8	(England) Alan O'Neill
9	(Northern Ireland) Peter McParland
10	(Scotland) Bobby Thomson
11	(England) Harry Burrows
Manager:
(England) Joe Mercer

1	(England) Roy Ironside
2	(England) Peter Perry
3	(England) Lol Morgan
4	(England) Roy Lambert (c)
5	(England) Peter Madden
6	(England) Ken Waterhouse
7	(England) Barry Webster
8	(England) Don Weston
9	(England) Ken Houghton
10	(England) Alan Kirkman
11	(England) Keith Bambridge
Manager:
(Scotland) Tom Johnston

== First Division ==
Pos	Team	Pld	W	D	L	GF	GA	GAv	Pts
7	Manchester United	42	18	9	15	88	76	1.158	45
8	Blackburn Rovers	42	15	13	14	77	76	1.013	43
9	Aston Villa	42	17	9	16	78	77	1.013	43
10	West Bromwich Albion	42	18	5	19	67	71	0.944	41
11	Arsenal	42	15	11	16	77	85	0.906	41

Source: World Football
Rules for classification: 1) Points; 2) Goal average; 3) Goals scored

=== Matches ===
20 August 1960	Aston Villa	3–2	Chelsea	Villa Park
	Peter McParland, Gerry Hitchens, Bobby Thomson	Report

22 August 1960	West Ham	5–2	Aston Villa	Boleyn Ground
		Report	Bobby Thomson, Gerry Hitchens

27 August 1960	Blackpool	5–3	Aston Villa	Bloomfield Road
		Report	Peter McParland, Gerry Hitchens (2)

29 August 1960	Aston Villa	2–1	West Ham	Villa Park
	Gerry Hitchens, Bobby Thomson	Report

3 September 1960	Aston Villa	3–2	Everton	Villa Park
	Gerry Hitchens (2), Bobby Thomson	Report

7 September 1960	Cardiff City	1–1	Aston Villa	Ninian Park
		Report	Vic Crowe

10 September 1960	Blackburn	4–1	Aston Villa	Ewood Park
		Report	Gerry Hitchens

12 September 1960	Aston Villa	2–1	Cardiff City	Villa Park
	Bobby Thomson, Harry Burrows	Report

17 September 1960	Aston Villa	3–1	Manchester United	Villa Park
	Harry Burrows, Bobby Thomson, Jimmy MacEwan	Report

24 September 1960	Tottenham Hotspur	6–2	Aston Villa	White Hart Lane
		Report	Jimmy MacEwan, Gerry Hitchens

1 October 1960	Aston Villa	1–3	Leicester City	Villa Park
	Peter McParland	Report

8 October 1960	Aston Villa	2–0	Newcastle United	Villa Park
	Ron Wylie, Vic Crowe	Report

15 October 1960	Arsenal	2–1	Aston Villa	Highbury
		Report	Jimmy MacEwan

22 October 1960	Aston Villa	6–2	Birmingham City	Villa Park
	Alan O’Neill (2), Gerry Hitchens (3), Peter McParland	Report

29 October 1960	West Bromwich Albion	0–2	Aston Villa	The Hawthorns
		Report	Gerry Hitchens, Alan O’Neill

5 November 1960	Aston Villa	2–0	Burnley	Villa Park
	Gerry Hitchens (2)	Report

12 November 1960	Preston North End	1–1	Aston Villa	Deepdale
		Report	Peter McParland

19 November 1960	Aston Villa	2–1	Fulham	Villa Park
	Jimmy MacEwan, Ron Wylie	Report

26 November 1960	Sheffield Wednesday	1–2	Aston Villa	Hillsborough
		Report	Own goal, Gerry Hitchens

3 December 1960	Aston Villa	5–1	Manchester City	Villa Park
	Alan O’Neill, Gerry Hitchens (2), Peter McParland, Ron Wylie	Report

10 December 1960	Nottingham Forest	2–0	Aston Villa	City Ground
		Report	—

17 December 1960	Chelsea	2–4	Aston Villa	Stamford Bridge
		Report	Jimmy MacEwan, Ron Wylie, Bobby Thomson (2)

24 December 1960	Aston Villa	0–2	Wolves	Villa Park
	—	Report

26 December 1960	Wolves	3–2	Aston Villa	Molineux
		Report	Gerry Hitchens (2)

31 December 1960	Aston Villa	2–2	Blackpool	Villa Park
	Gerry Hitchens (2)	Report

21 January 1961	Aston Villa	2–2	Blackburn	Villa Park
	Gerry Hitchens (2)

4 February 1961	Manchester United	1–1	Aston Villa	Old Trafford
			Bobby Thomson

11 February 1961	Aston Villa	1–2	Tottenham Hotspur	Villa Park
	Stan Lynn (pen)

25 February 1961	Newcastle United	2–1	Aston Villa	St James' Park
			Peter McParland

4 March 1961	Aston Villa	2–2	Arsenal	Villa Park
	Peter McParland, Jimmy MacEwan

11 March 1961	Birmingham City	1–1	Aston Villa	St Andrew's
			Gerry Hitchens

22 March 1961	Everton	1–2	Aston Villa	Goodison Park
			Alan Deakin, Bobby Thomson

25 March 1961	Burnley	1–1	Aston Villa	Turf Moor
			Gerry Hitchens

28 March 1961	Aston Villa	0–1	West Bromwich Albion	Villa Park
	—

1 April 1961	Aston Villa	1–2	Nottingham Forest	Villa Park
	Peter McParland

3 April 1961	Bolton Wanderers	3–0	Aston Villa	Burnden Park
			—

4 April 1961	Aston Villa	4–0	Bolton Wanderers	Villa Park
	Jimmy MacEwan (2), Peter McParland, Alan O’Neill

8 April 1961	Fulham	1–1	Aston Villa	Craven Cottage
			Gerry Hitchens

15 April 1961	Aston Villa	1–0	Preston North End	Villa Park
	Bobby Thomson

19 April 1961	Leicester City	3–1	Aston Villa	Filbert Street
			Alfie Hale

22 April 1961	Manchester City	4–1	Aston Villa	Maine Road
			Vic Crowe

29 April 1961	Aston Villa	4–1	Sheffield Wednesday	Villa Park
	Gerry Hitchens (2), Bobby Thomson, Johnny Dixon

== FA Cup ==
=== Third round ===
The 44 First and Second Division clubs entered the competition at this stage.

The matches were scheduled for Saturday, 7 January 1961. Nine matches were drawn and went to replays, with two of these requiring a second replay. Oxford United was the last non-league club left in the competition.

Tie no	Home team	Score	Away team	Date
19	Bristol Rovers	1–1	Aston Villa	7 January 1961
Replay	Aston Villa	4–0	Bristol Rovers	9 January 1961

=== Fourth round ===
The matches were scheduled for Saturday, 28 January 1961, with three games postponed until 1 February. Six matches were drawn and went to replays, which were all played in the following midweek match, and one of these was then replayed a second time. Tottenham Hotspur and Crewe Alexandra were drawn together for the second consecutive season in the fourth round, with Tottenham having beaten Crewe 13–2 in a replay the one year earlier.

The fourth round match between second division Luton Town and first division Manchester City at Kenilworth Road was originally played on Saturday 28 January 1961. It saw Luton Town take a 2–0 lead before Denis Law scored 6 goals for Manchester City. The match was then abandoned at 6–2 to Manchester City due to a waterlogged pitch. When the match was held again 4 days later on Wednesday 1 February 1961, Luton Town beat Manchester City 3–1.

Tie no	Home team	Score	Away team	Date
15	Peterborough United	1–1	Aston Villa	28 January 1961
Replay	Aston Villa	2–1	Peterborough United	1 February 1961

=== Fifth round ===
The matches were scheduled for Saturday, 18 February 1961. One match went to a replay in the following mid-week fixture.

Tie no	Home team	Score	Away team	Date
2	Aston Villa	0–2	Tottenham Hotspur	18 February 1961
