= List of Rotherham United F.C. players =

This is a list of notable footballers who have played for Rotherham United. The aim is for this list to include all players that have played 100 or more senior matches for the club. Other players who are deemed to have played an important role for the club can be included, but the reason for their notability should be included in the 'Notes' column.

The table should also include details of players who played for the two sides that merged to form United - Rotherham County and Rotherham Town.

For a list of all Rotherham United players with a Wikipedia article, see Category:Rotherham United F.C. players, and for the current squad see the main Rotherham United F.C. article.

== Table ==
Players should be listed according to the year of their first team debut, and then by alphabetical order of their surname.

Appearances and goals should be for first-team competitive matches only, but excluding wartime matches. Substitute appearances should be included.

Name	Position	Rotherham career	League Apps	League Goals	Total Apps	Total Goals	Notes
Richard Jackson	DF	1922–1932	345	1	365	1	
Andy Smailes	WH	1929–1932	26	1	31	1	Manager of Rotherham 1952–1958
Reg Freeman	DF	1930-1934	95	3	98	3	Manager of Rotherham 1934-1952
Wally Ardron	FW	1938–1948	122	98	127	102	
Jack Edwards	DF	1946-1953	296	9	312	9	
Alf Gibson	DF	1946-1953	152	0	159	0	
Gladstone Guest	FW	1946–1955	358	130	375	133	Record Number of League Goals Scored (130), 2nd Highest Number of Goals in Total. (133)
Jack Selkirk	DF	1946–1956	427	13	451	13	3rd Highest Number of League Appearances
Jack Shaw	FW	1946–1952	262	122	279	138	Record Goal Scorer in Total (138), 2nd Highest Number of League Goals. (122)
Danny Williams	WH	1946–1959	461	22	492	24	Manager of Rotherham 1962–1965, Record Number of League Appearances 461), 2nd Highest Number of Appearances in Total. (492)
Horace Williams	DF	1946-1953	206	11	216	11	
Jack Grainger	FW	1947–1956	352	112	372	120	3rd Highest Number of Goal Scored in Total. (120)
Ron Bolton	GK	1948-1954	151	0	157	0	
Norman Noble	WH	1948–1957	326	21	345	22	
Jock Quairney	GK	1948-1959	260	0	275	0	
Colin Rawson	DF	1949-1952	113	12	123	13	
Frank Marshall	DF	1951-1957	131	6	148	8	
Roy Silman	DF	1952-1959	105	2	109	2	
Peter Johnson	DF	1953-1957	153	23	157	23	
Ian Wilson	FW	1953-1955	108	45	111	45	
Lol Morgan	DF	1954-1963	291	0	326	0	
Keith Bainbridge	MF	1955-1963	162	15	179	16	
Keith Kettleborough	MF	1955-1960	119	20	130	22	
Brian Jackson	MF	1955-1964	131	6	148	8	
Peter Madden	DF	1955–1965	311	7	353	8	
Roy Ironside	GK	1956–1964	220	0	252	0	
Roy Lambert	DF	1956-1964	307	6	344	6	
Barry Webster	FW	1956–1962	179	37	201	41	
Alan Kirkman	FW	1958-1963	142	58	168	62	
Ken Waterhouse	MF	1958-1962	123	12	142	13	
Ken Houghton	FW	1960-1964	149	56	176	67	
Albert Bennett	FW	1960–1964	108	64	121	70	
Ian Butler	MF	1960–1964	102	27	118	29	
John Haselden	DF	1961-1968	103	0	121	0	
Frank Casper	MF	1962–1966	102	25	108	29	
Brian Tiler	DF	1962-1968	213	27	247	32	
Colin Clish	DF	1963-1967	128	4	148	4	
Barry Lyons	MF	1963–1966	125	23	144	26	
John Galley	FW	1964-1967	108	46	125	54	
Harold Wilcockson	DF	1964-1967	109	2	127	3	
Les Chappell	FW	1965-1967	108	37	115	38	
Dave Bentley	MF	1966-1973	249	14	289	18	
Neil Hague	DF	1967-1971	144	23	168	25	
Dennis Leigh	DF	1967-1972	160	10	184	10	
Johnny Quinn	MF	1967-1972	114	7	129	8	
Trevor Swift	DF	1967-1974	288	21	331	26	
Roy Tunks	GK	1967-1973	138	0	158	0	
Dave Watson	DF	1967-1970	121	19	141	22	Was Record Sale of £100,000 in 1970 to Sunderland. He went on to win 65 caps for England.
Jimmy Mullen	MF	1968-1973	177	24	203	28	
Trevor Womble	MF	1968-1978	215	39	248	45	
William Houghton	DF	1969-1973	139	1	161	1	
Trevor Philips	FW	1969-1979	321	80	362	91	
Neil Warnock	MF	1969-1971	54	5	62	5	Manager of Rotherham 2016
Rodney Johnson	MF	1970-1973	110	8	122	9	
Ray Mielczarek	DF	1970-1973	115	7	124	8	
Jim McDonagh	GK	1970-1975	121	0	135	0	
John Breckin	DF	1971–1982	409	8	467	12	3rd Highest number of Rotherham Appearances in Total (467)
Mick Leng	DF	1971-1975	101	2	112	2	
Alan Crawford	MF	1973-1978	237	49	274	67	
Richard Finney	FW	1973-1980	236	68	282	82	
Jimmy Goodfellow	MF	1973-1977	192	8	219	9	
Tommy Spencer	DF	1974-1977	138	10	10		
John Green	DF	1975-1983,1986-1988	333	11	389	17	
Dave Gwyther	FW	1975-1979	162	45	183	55	
Tom McAllister	GK	1975–1978	159	0	185	0	
Mark Rhodes	MF	1975-1984	258	13	299	14	
Paul Stancliffe	DF	1975–1983,1990	290	8	327	10	
Gerry Forrest	DF	1977–1985,1990-1991	391	7	464	9	
Ray Mountford	GK	1978–1982	123	0	141	0	
Rodney Fern	FW	1979-1983	105	34	120	39	
Mick Gooding	MF	1979-1982,1983-1986	258	42	308	52	
Phil Henson	MF	1979-1983	92	7	107	8	Manager of Rotherham 1991-1994
Billy McEwan	MF	1979-1983	95	10	107	10	Manager of Rotherham 1988-1991
Ronnie Moore	FW	1980-1983	125	52	139	56	Manager of Rotherham 1997-2005 and 2009-2011
John Seasman	MF	1980–1983	100	25	111	27	
Tony Towner	MF	1980-1983	108	12	118	13	Was Record Signing of £150,000 in 1980 from Millwall.
Emlyn Hughes	DF	1981-1983	56	6	61	6	Player-Manager of Rotherham 1981-1983
Bobby Mimms	GK	1981-1984,1997-1998	126	0	141	0	Was Record Sale of £180,000 in 1985 to Everton.
Nigel Johnson	DF	1983-1984,1987-1993	264	10	327	13	
Alan Birch	MF	1983–1985	101	28	118	35	
Phil Crosby	DF	1983-1988	183	2	224	2	
John Dungworth	DF	1983-1987	186	17	222	20	
Mike Pickering	DF	1983–1985	102	1	117	1	
Mike Trusson	MF	1983–1986	124	19	143	24	
Andy Barnsley	DF	1985-1986,1988-1991	111	3	132	4	
Kelham O'Hanlon	GK	1985-1990	248	0	304	0	
Daral Pugh	MF	1985–1987	112	6	138	9	
Andy Williams	MF	1986–1988, 1993–1994	138	15	166	17	
John Buckley	MF	1987–1990, 1993	109	13	131	15	
Tony Grealish	MF	1987-1990	110	7	134	12	
Martin Scott	DF	1987-1991	94	3	121	7	Was record sale of £200,000 in 1990 to Bristol City
Shaun Goodwin	MF	1987–1997	280	39	351	47	
Des Hazel	MF	1988-1994	238	28	291	38	
Billy Russell	DF	1988–1992	105	2	125	2	
Bobby Williamson	FW	1988–1990	93	49	112	56	
Shaun Goater	FW	1989–1996	209	70	260	86	
Billy Mercer	GK	1989–1994	104	0	138	0	
Neil Richardson	DF	1989-1998	184	10	222	11	
Nicky Law	DF	1990–1993	128	3	159	4	
Matt Clarke	GK	1992-1995	124	0	141	0	Was Captain of 1996 Autoglass Winning Team. Also was Record Sale of £325,000 in 1996 to Sheffield W.
Chris Wilder	DF	1992-1995	132	11	158	12	
Ian Breckin	DF	1993–1996	132	6	154	6	
Paul Hurst	DF	1993–2008	433	13	494	15	Record Number of Rotherham Appearances in Total (494), 2nd Highest Number of League Appearances. (433)
Andy Hayward	FW	1994-1997	120	15	140	20	
Andy Roscoe	MF	1994-1998	202	18	233	22	
Trevor Berry	MF	1995–2000	173	20	204	24	
Darren Garner	MF	1995-2004	264	23	307	30	
Mike Jeffrey	FW	1995-1996	22	5	29	6	Record Sale of £255,000 in 1996 to Fortuna Sittard.
Nigel Jemson	FW	1995-1996	16	5	19	9	Scored both goals in 1996 Auto Windscreen Final win.
Lee Glover	FW	1996-2000	85	29	102	32	Was Joint Record Signing of £150,000 in 1996 from Port Vale.
Alan Knill	DF	1997-1999	74	5	85	7	Manager of Rotherham 2005-2007
Chris Sedgwick	MF	1997-2004	243	17	271	21	
Steve Thompson	MF	1997-1999	103	15	119	16	
Leo Fortune-West	FW	1998-2000	64	30	72	30	
Andy Monkhouse	MF	1998-2006	128	9	147	12	
Mike Pollitt	GK	1998–2000, 2001–2005	267	0	300	0	
Rob Scott	DF	1998-2004	174	9	199	10	
Guy Branston	DF	2000–2003, 2011	106	13	120	13	
Paul Warne	FW	1999–2005, 2009–	258	31	292	34	Manager of Rotherham 2016 to 2022
Kevin Watson	MF	1999–2002	109	7	125	8	
Richie Barker	FW	2000-2005, 2008-2009	153	13	170	19	
Alan Lee	FW	2000–2003	111	37	122	41	Was Joint Record Signing of £150,000 in 2000 from Burnley. And also was Record Sale of £850,000 in 2003 to Cardiff.
Mark Robins	FW	2000–2003	108	44	121	49	Manager of Rotherham 2007–2009
Stewart Talbot	MF	2000–2003	114	8	127	8	
Martin McIntosh	DF	2001-2004	122	16	132	16	
John Mullin	MF	2001–2005	180	12	195	14	
Chris Swailes	DF	2001-2004	167	14	184	16	
Shaun Barker	DF	2002–2005	123	7	133	7	
Martin Butler	FW	2003–2006	97	28	104	29	Was Joint Record Signing of £150,000 in 2003 from Reading.
Ryan Taylor	FW	2005–2011	132	21	153	24	Scored both goals in 2010 Play-off Final defeat.
Ian Sharps	DF	2006-2010, 2012-2013	186	9	217	12	
Danny Harrison	MF	2007–2012	188	15	213	18	
Dale Tonge	DF	2007–2013	163	1	185	2	
Andy Warrington	GK	2007–2013	205	0	236	0	
Nick Fenton	DF	2008–2011	115	4	137	6	
Nicky Law	MF	2009–2011	86	6	101	6	
Adam Le Fondre	FW	2009–2011	93	52	105	58	
Tom Pope	FW	2009–2011	53	4	59	6	Was Joint Record Signing of £150,000 in 2009 from Crewe.
Ben Pringle	MF	2011-2015	147	19	168	22	
Alex Revell	FW	2011-2015	150	28	170	34	Scored 2 goals in 2014 Play-off Final win.
Kari Arnason	DF	2012-2015	116	5	130	5	
Lee Frecklington	MF	2012-2018	167	28	186	34	Was Record Signing of £160,000 in 2013 from Peterborough.
Richard Smallwood	MF	2013-2017	127	3	133	3	
Jordan Bowery	FW	2014–2016	40	5	44	6	Was Record Signing of a reported £250,000 in 2014 from Aston Villa.
Danny Ward	FW	2014–2017	91	18	95	19	Was Record Sale of £1,600,000 in 2017 to Cardiff.
Richard Wood	DF	2014-2023	229	18	255	22	Scored 2 goals in 2018 Play-off Final win.
Jonson Clarke-Harris	FW	2015–2018	71	9	79	10	Was Record Signing of a reported £350,000 in 2014.
Joe Mattock	DF	2015-2022	208	4	225	5	
Joe Newell	MF	2015-2019	139	14	150	15	
Jon Taylor	MF	2016-2019	106	12	117	13	Was Record Signing of a reported £400,000 in 2016 from Peterborough.
Will Vaulks	MF	2016-2019	125	13	135	17	Record Sale of £3,500,000 in 2019 to Cardiff.
Michael Ihiekwe	DF	2017–2022	163	10	184	14	
Ben Wiles	MF	2017–2023	170	15	190	17	
Michael Smith	MF	2018-2022	188	52	210	61	
Matt Crooks	MF	2019–2021	88	18	96	21	
Freddie Ladapo	FW	2019–2022	104	34	123	41	Record Signing of a reported £500,000 in 2019 from Plymouth.
Dan Barlaser	MF	2019-2023	131	16	151	16	
Jamie Lindsay	MF	2019-2023	120	7	139	7	
Chiedozie Ogbene	MF	2019-2023	120	12	136	14	
Wes Harding	DF	2020-2023	126	1	139	2	
