= 1959–60 Aston Villa F.C. season =

English football club season

Aston Villa
1959–60 season
- Chairman: Chris Buckley
- Manager: Joe Mercer
- Stadium: Villa Park
- Second Division: 1st
- FA Cup: Semi-finals

The 1959–60 English football season was Aston Villa's 61st season in The Football League. Villa played in the Second Division. They earned an immediate return to the First Division as Second Division champions, and were joined in promotion by runners-up Cardiff City.

== Players ==
Bobby Thomson transferred to Aston Villa, newly relegated to the Second Division, in 1959 for a fee of £8,000. Here, he made an immediate impact, scoring 22 goals in his first season, which made him the club's top scorer and helped them win the 1959–60 Second Division championship.

Deakin signed for the club as a 15-year-old. He became a regular in the side during the 1960–61 season and collected a League Cup winners' tankard at the start of the following season. He broke his ankle during the 1964–65 season, but recovered to skipper the side for the 1966–67 season. Deakin also played for the England under 23 team.

Harry Burrows was born in Haydock and attracted the attention of Aston Villa whilst playing for Wigan Boys. but turned his attentions on becoming an apprentice with the National Coal Board (NCB). Villa manager Joe Mercer persuaded Burrows to sign part-time in March 1958. He played and scored in the final of the inaugural League Cup in 1961 as Villa beat Rotherham United 3–2. Burrows won an England U23 cap against Greece and finished as Villa's top goalscorer in 1961–62 and 1962–63.

There were debuts for Alan Deakin (231), Harry Burrows (147), Jimmy MacEwan (143), Bobby Thomson (140), Mike Tindall (120), John Neal (96), Jimmy Adam (24), Terry Morrall (8), Kevin Keelan (5), Norman Ashe (5) and Brian Handley (3).

== Second Division ==
Pos	Team	Pld	W	D	L	GF	GA	GAv	Pts	Qualification or relegation
1	Aston Villa (C, P)	42	25	9	8	89	43	2.070	59	Promotion to the First Division
2	Cardiff City (P)	42	23	12	7	90	62	1.452	58	Promotion to the First Division
3	Liverpool	42	20	10	12	90	66	1.364	50	
4	Sheffield United	42	19	12	11	68	51	1.333	50	
5	Middlesbrough	42	19	10	13	90	64	1.406	48	

Rules for classification: 1) Points; 2) Goal average; 3) Goals scored
(C) Champions; (P) Promoted

=== Matches ===
22 August 1959	Brighton	1–2	Aston Villa	Goldstone Ground
		Report	Jimmy MacEwan 23', Jackie Sewell 86'
Note:

26 August 1959	Sunderland	1–0	Aston Villa	Roker Park
		Report

29 August 1959	Aston Villa	1–0	Swansea	Villa Park
	Peter McParland 7'	Report

31 August 1959	Aston Villa	3–0	Sunderland	Villa Park
	Gerry Hitchens 13', 40', Bobby Thomson 60'	Report

5 September 1959	Bristol Rovers	1–1	Aston Villa	Eastville Stadium
		Report	Gerry Hitchens 10'

9 September 1959	Portsmouth	1–2	Aston Villa	Fratton Park
		Report	Gerry Hitchens 6', Bobby Thomson 38'

12 September 1959	Aston Villa	3–1	Ipswich Town	Villa Park
	Peter McParland 3', 43', Ron Wylie 16'	Report

14 September 1959	Aston Villa	5–2	Portsmouth	Villa Park
	Bobby Thomson 2', Peter McParland 21', 90', Jimmy MacEwan 28', 62'	Report

19 September 1959	Huddersfield Town	0–1	Aston Villa	Leeds Road
		Report	Peter McParland 70'

26 September 1959	Aston Villa	1–0	Leyton Orient	Villa Park
	Gerry Hitchens 67'	Report

30 September 1959	Stoke City	3–3	Aston Villa	Victoria Ground
			Own goal 65', Peter McParland 67', 74'

3 October 1959	Lincoln City	0–0	Aston Villa	Sincil Bank
			—

10 October 1959	Sheffield United	1–1	Aston Villa	Bramall Lane
			Gerry Hitchens 70'

17 October 1959	Aston Villa	1–0	Middlesbrough	Villa Park
	Stan Lynn 66'

24 October 1959	Derby County	2–2	Aston Villa	Baseball Ground
			Peter McParland 75', 77'

31 October 1959	Aston Villa	2–0	Plymouth Argyle	Villa Park
	Jimmy MacEwan 9', Peter McParland 17'

7 November 1959	Liverpool	2–1	Aston Villa	Anfield
			Peter McParland 58'
Note:

14 November 1959	Aston Villa	11–1	Charlton Athletic	Villa Park
	Gerry Hitchens 2', 29', 40', 46', 60', Bobby Thomson 26', 65', Ron Wylie 63', Jimmy MacEwan 69', Peter McParland 72', 86'

21 November 1959	Bristol City	0–5	Aston Villa	Ashton Gate
			Gerry Hitchens 41', 43', 86', Ron Wylie 55', Peter McParland 87'

28 November 1959	Aston Villa	5–0	Scunthorpe United	Villa Park
	Peter McParland 28', 34', Gerry Hitchens 43', 62', Bobby Thomson 79'

5 December 1959	Rotherham United	2–1	Aston Villa	Millmoor
			Jimmy Adam 35'

12 December 1959	Aston Villa	2–0	Cardiff City	Villa Park
	Jimmy Adam 77', Gerry Hitchens 89'

19 December 1959	Aston Villa	3–1	Brighton	Villa Park
	Peter McParland 57', 67', Gerry Hitchens 77'

26 December 1959	Hull City	0–1	Aston Villa	Boothferry Park
			Peter McParland 61'

28 December 1959	Aston Villa	1–1	Hull City	Villa Park
	Stan Lynn 65' (pen)

2 January 1960	Swansea	1–3	Aston Villa	Vetch Field
			Bobby Thomson 17', 55', Gerry Hitchens 89'

16 January 1960	Aston Villa	4–1	Bristol Rovers	Villa Park
	Bobby Thomson 40', 75', Jimmy Adam 54', Vic Crowe 86'

23 January 1960	Ipswich Town	2–1	Aston Villa	Portman Road
			Jimmy Dugdale 85'

6 February 1960	Aston Villa	4–0	Huddersfield Town	Villa Park
	Bobby Thomson 29', 36', 55', Gerry Hitchens 75'

13 February 1960	Leyton Orient	0–0	Aston Villa	Brisbane Road
			—

27 February 1960	Aston Villa	1–3	Sheffield United	Villa Park
	Bobby Thomson 63'

1 March 1960	Aston Villa	1–1	Lincoln City	Villa Park
	Bobby Thomson 80'

5 March 1960	Middlesbrough	0–1	Aston Villa	Ayresome Park
			Gerry Hitchens 14'

15 March 1960	Aston Villa	3–2	Derby County	Villa Park
	Stan Lynn 13' (pen), Peter McParland 46', Vic Crowe 66'

19 March 1960	Scunthorpe United	1–2	Aston Villa	Old Showground
			Gerry Hitchens 44', 53'

30 March 1960	Aston Villa	4–4	Liverpool	Villa Park
	Peter McParland 66', Bobby Thomson 72', 85', Stan Lynn 75' (pen)
Note:

2 April 1960	Charlton Athletic	2–0	Aston Villa	The Valley
			—

9 April 1960	Aston Villa	2–1	Bristol City	Villa Park
	Stan Lynn 48' (pen), 87' (pen)

16 April 1960	Cardiff City	1–0	Aston Villa	Ninian Park
			—

18 April 1960	Aston Villa	2–1	Stoke City	Villa Park
	Stan Lynn 60' (pen), Bobby Thomson 68'

23 April 1960	Aston Villa	3–0	Rotherham United	Villa Park
	Bobby Thomson 47', 89', Ron Wylie 70'

30 April 1960	Plymouth Argyle	3–0	Aston Villa	Home Park
			—

== FA Cup ==
9 January 1960 Third round	Aston Villa	2–1	Leeds United
Note: The 44 First and Second Division clubs entered the competition at this stage. Watford's win over Birmingham City was the first in the Cup by a club from the new Fourth Division over First Division opponents.

30 January 1960 Fourth round	Chelsea	1–2	Aston Villa
Note: The 4th round matches were scheduled for Saturday, 30 January 1960. Peterborough United celebrated their final season in non-league football by reaching this stage and being the last team from the qualifying rounds left in the competition.

20 February 1960 Fifth round	Port Vale	1–2	Aston Villa
Note: All 5th round matches were scheduled for Saturday, 20 February 1960.

12 March 1960 Sixth round	Aston Villa	2–0	Preston North End	Villa Park, Birmingham
15:00 GMT	Hitchens; McParland			Attendance: 69,732; Referee: K. Howley (Middlesbrough)
Note: The draw was made on Monday, 22 February 1960. All the original matches were played on Saturday, 12 March 1960.

26 March 1960 Semi-finals	Aston Villa	0–1	Wolverhampton Wanderers	The Hawthorns, West Bromwich
15:00 GMT			Deeley	Attendance: 55,596; Referee: A. Jobling (Lancashire)
Note: The draw for the semi-finals was made on Monday, 14 March 1960. Both matches were played on Saturday, 26 March 1960.
