= Jimmy McEwan =

Scottish footballer

Personal information
- Full name: Jimmy McEwan
- Date of birth: 22 March 1929
- Place of birth: Dundee, Scotland
- Date of death: 28 November 2017 (aged 88)
- Place of death: Birmingham, England
- Position: Right wing

Senior career*
Years	Team	Apps	(Gls)
1947–1951	Arbroath		
1951–1959	Raith Rovers	209	(53)
1959–1966	Aston Villa	143	(28)
1966–1967	Walsall	10	(1)
Total		362	(83)

International career
1959	SFL trial v SFA	1	(0)
- * Club domestic league appearances and goals

James McEwan (22 March 1929 – 28 November 2017) was a Scottish professional footballer, who usually played at right wing. He played for Arbroath and Raith Rovers in Scotland before settling in the West Midlands in England playing for Aston Villa and Walsall.

McEwan usually played right wing but sometimes at inside right. He was described in the profile by Aston Villa's club historian as, "a craggy-and-hungry-looking outside-right, a player who hugged the touchline, cutting in when the ball was being moved along the opposite flank," and "With Raith he blossomed into a goalscoring right-winger-cum-centre-forward." He was a fast and tricky player with a useful goal scoring record. He had a Stanley Matthews style way he would side-step a full-back before delivering over a good cross.

== Arbroath ==
McEwan started his career with East Craigie in the Scottish Junior Football Association set up in his birth town of Dundee. From there he joined the senior ranks signing for Arbroath in the second tier of the Scottish Football League. At Arbroath he hit what the club's history suggests is the fastest ever goal at their Gayfield stadium, scoring after 10 seconds against Dumbarton on 6 January 1951. He was managed by Arch Anderson and then Alec Cheyne.

== Raith Rovers ==
In 1951 he moved up a division to join Raith Rovers in the Scottish top flight, a division they stayed in for all of that decade. McEwan and Raith ended their first season together with a fifth-place finish in the league. Raith reached the 1955–56 Scottish Cup semi final. They were eliminated in a replay by Heart of Midlothian who with Dave Mackay went on to beat Celtic in the final. In December of the same year Raith had their decade's most eye-catching single result when they beat Rangers 5–1 in Kirkcaldy. Raith appeared genuine title contenders for part of that season before finishing fourth, their best in McEwan's eight season at the club and their best since 1922. Their league form of that season was matched by a run to the 1956–57 Scottish Cup semi final. Again they were eliminated in a replay by the team who won the trophy, in this case the Falkirk team of Alex Parker. He was top scorer at Raith for three seasons from 1956 to 1959. At different times McEwan played alongside Raith Hall of Famers Willie McNaught, Willie Penman, Willie Polland, Johnny Urquhart and Andy Young.

When at Raith, he was selected to play for a Scottish Football League XI against a Scotland XI at Ibrox on 16 March 1959 in a trial match prior to Scotland playing against England at Wembley in the 1958–59 British Home Championship. The league side won 6–5, with McEwan providing a cross for the first of three goals by John White. McEwan was never selected for the full international side, or the SFL team in an inter-league fixture. He left Raith at the end of that season.

== Aston Villa ==
Aston Villa bought him in 1959. McEwan helped Villa win the Football League Division Two championship in his first season for promotion to England's top flight. Les Smith's achilles injury ultimately led to his retirement in 1960 opening a place on the team sheet at right wing. Given his chance, McEwan was an important player in attack at Villa teaming up well with Vic Crowe and Bobby Thomson. In one game Villa beat Charlton Athletic 11–1 at Villa Park in November 1959 with all five Villa forwards scoring including five by Gerry Hitchens. That same season Villa reached the 1959–60 FA Cup semi-final. In an all-West midlands affair played at The Hawthorns in West Bromwich, McEwan's club again lost to the eventual winners, this time Wolverhampton Wanderers.

On 27 September 1960 he played against ex-club Raith in a game to formally mark the switch on of the Starks Park floodlights. Raith won 2–1. Villa reached the 1961 Football League Cup Final. Villa won the inaugural version of the trophy beating Rotherham United 3–2 on aggregate. Seventh in the 1961–62 Football League was his highest finish in England.

He was punched in the face breaking four teeth in the November 1962 match against Sheffield Wednesday. While the match officials missed the incident itself, the referee was able to see the deep teeth marks in Bronco Layne's knuckles and sent-off the Wednesday player.

His favourite Villa game was his first start of the season on 19 March 1966, 5–5 draw away at Tottenham Hotspur, three days before his 37th birthday. His last game at Villa Park was on 6 April 1966 when he scored when captaining his team in a 1–1 draw against Manchester United. At Villa he scored 28 goals from 143 league games and 4 goals from 18 League Cup games. No goals from his 20 Villa FA Cup ties gave him totals of 181 games with 32 goals.

The Birmingham Mail on 26 July 2017 reported they believed him to be Villa's oldest surviving ex-player.

== Walsall ==
He left Villa in 1966 to play that season for Walsall. He then joined the coaching staff at Fellows Park remaining there until 1973.

== Later days ==
He worked at Ansells Brewery and worked at the Social Security Offices in Handsworth. He played football for the Villa Old Stars into his 50s until forced to stop due to knee replacement operations.

McEwan died on 28 November 2017 of heart failure at the Madeleine House care home in Birmingham. He was 88. He had been in good health at the care home until around 18 months before his death when he developed heart trouble and late onset dementia. He is survived by sons Eric and Duncan.

== Honours ==
Aston Villa

- Football League Second Division: 1959–60
- Football League Cup: 1960–61
