= 1955–56 Aston Villa F.C. season =

English football club season

Aston Villa
1955–56 season
- Chairman: Chris Buckley
- Manager: Eric Houghton
- First Division: 20th
- FA Cup: Fourth round

Second City Derby
- 23--14--20

The 1955–56 English football season was Aston Villa's 57th season in The Football League. Villa played in the First Division, the top-tier of English football.

Both matches in the Second City Derby were drawn, 0–0 at home, 2–2 away.

There were debut appearances for Nigel Sims (264), Jimmy Dugdale (215), Pat Saward (152), Jackie Sewell (123), Les J Smith (115), Dave Hickson (12), George Ashfield (9), and Roy Pritchard (3).

== Table ==
| Pos | Team | Pld | W | D | L | GF | GA | GAv | Pts | Qualification or relegation |
|---|---|---|---|---|---|---|---|---|---|---|
| 18 | Tottenham Hotspur | 42 | 15 | 7 | 20 | 61 | 71 | 0.859 | 37 | |
| 19 | Preston North End | 42 | 14 | 8 | 20 | 73 | 72 | 1.014 | 36 | |
| 20 | Aston Villa | 42 | 11 | 13 | 18 | 52 | 69 | 0.754 | 35 | |
| 21 | Huddersfield Town (R) | 42 | 14 | 7 | 21 | 54 | 83 | 0.651 | 35 | Relegation to the Second Division |
| 22 | Sheffield United (R) | 42 | 12 | 9 | 21 | 63 | 77 | 0.818 | 33 | Relegation to the Second Division |

Source: World Football
Rules for classification: 1) Points; 2) Goal average; 3) Goals scored
(R) Relegated

=== Matches ===
| 20 August 1955 1 | Manchester City | 2–2 | Aston Villa | Maine Road |
| | | Report | Johnny Dixon (4', 16') |

| 24 August 1955 2 | Sunderland | 5–1 | Aston Villa | Roker Park |
| | | Report | Johnny Dixon (63') |

| 27 August 1955 3 | Aston Villa | 2–0 | Cardiff City | Villa Park |
| | Johnny Dixon (10'), Peter McParland (78') | Report |

| 29 August 1955 4 | Aston Villa | 1–4 | Sunderland | Villa Park |
| | Norman Lockhart (73') | Report |

| 3 September 1955 5 | Huddersfield Town | 1–1 | Aston Villa | Leeds Road |
| | | Report | Peter McParland (1') |

| 5 September 1955 6 | Aston Villa | 0–0 | Birmingham City | Villa Park |
| | | Report |

| 10 September 1955 7 | Aston Villa | 1–1 | Blackpool | Villa Park |
| | Own goal (11') | Report |

| 17 September 1955 8 | Chelsea | 0–0 | Aston Villa | Stamford Bridge |
| | | Report |

| 21 September 1955 9 | Birmingham City | 2–2 | Aston Villa | St Andrew's |
| | | Report | Own goal (44'), Bill Baxter (69') |

| 24 September 1955 10 | Aston Villa | 0–2 | Bolton Wanderers | Villa Park |
| | | Report |

| 1 October 1955 11 | Arsenal | 1–0 | Aston Villa | Highbury |
| | | Report |

| 8 October 1955 12 | West Bromwich Albion | 1–0 | Aston Villa | The Hawthorns |
| | | Report |

| 15 October 1955 13 | Aston Villa | 4–4 | Manchester United | Villa Park |
| | Johnny Dixon (16', 23'), Dave Hickson (60'), Pat Saward (64') | Report |

| 22 October 1955 14 | Everton | 2–1 | Aston Villa | Goodison Park |
| | | Report | Johnny Dixon (66') |

| 29 October 1955 15 | Aston Villa | 3–0 | Newcastle United | Villa Park |
| | Johnny Dixon (1'), Vic Crowe (48'), Norman Lockhart (78') | Report |

| 5 November 1955 16 | Burnley | 2–0 | Aston Villa | Turf Moor |
| | | Report |

| 12 November 1955 17 | Aston Villa | 1–0 | Luton Town | Villa Park |
| | Johnny Dixon (70') | Report |

| 19 November 1955 18 | Charlton Athletic | 3–1 | Aston Villa | The Valley |
| | | Report | Norman Lockhart (4') |

| 26 November 1955 19 | Aston Villa | 0–2 | Tottenham Hotspur | Villa Park |
| | | Report |

| 3 December 1955 20 | Sheffield United | 2–2 | Aston Villa | Bramall Lane |
| | | Report | Jackie Sewell (36'), Derek Pace (62') |

| 10 December 1955 21 | Aston Villa | 3–2 | Preston North End | Villa Park |
| | Bill Baxter (2'), Amos Moss (32'), Norman Lockhart (52') | Report |

| 17 December 1955 22 | Aston Villa | 0–3 | Manchester City | Villa Park |
| | | Report |

| 24 December 1955 23 | Cardiff City | 1–0 | Aston Villa | Ninian Park |
| | | Report |

| 26 December 1955 24 | Aston Villa | 1–3 | Portsmouth | Villa Park |
| | Johnny Dixon (38') | Report |

| 27 December 1955 25 | Portsmouth | 2–2 | Aston Villa | Fratton Park |
| | | Report | Peter McParland (53'), Jackie Sewell (79') |

| 31 December 1955 26 | Aston Villa | 3–0 | Huddersfield Town | Villa Park |
| | Johnny Dixon (3', 6'), Stan Lynn (64') | Report |

| 14 January 1956 27 | Blackpool | 6–0 | Aston Villa | Bloomfield Road |
| | | Report |

| 21 January 1956 28 | Aston Villa | 1–4 | Chelsea | Villa Park |
| | Stan Lynn (15') | Report |

| 11 February 1956 29 | Aston Villa | 1–1 | Arsenal | Villa Park |
| | Johnny Dixon (19') | Report |

| 18 February 1956 30 | Bolton Wanderers | 1–0 | Aston Villa | Burnden Park |
| | | Report |

| 25 February 1956 31 | Manchester United | 1–0 | Aston Villa | Old Trafford |
| | | Report |
Note: With defeat against United, Villa found themselves bottom with 20 points from 31 games. They seemed doomed to be relegated to the Second Division.

| 3 March 1956 32 | Aston Villa | 1–1 | Charlton Athletic | Villa Park |
| | Derek Pace (81') | Report |

| 10 March 1956 33 | Newcastle United | 2–3 | Aston Villa | St James' Park |
| | | Report | Peter McParland (13'), Derek Pace (37'), Johnny Dixon (70') |

| 19 March 1956 34 | Aston Villa | 2–0 | Burnley | Villa Park |
| | Johnny Dixon 11, Les Smith 32 | Report |
Note: Nigel Sims (264) debut

| 24 March 1956 35 | Luton Town | 2–1 | Aston Villa | Kenilworth Road |
| | | Report | Tommy Southren (33') |

| 31 March 1956 36 | Aston Villa | 2–0 | Everton | Villa Park |
| | Derek Pace (44'), Johnny Dixon (84') | Report |

| 2 April 1956 37 | Wolverhampton Wanderers | 0–0 | Aston Villa | Molineux |
| | | Report |

| 3 April 1956 38 | Aston Villa | 0–0 | Wolverhampton Wanderers | Villa Park |
| | | Report |

| 7 April 1956 39 | Tottenham Hotspur | 4–3 | Aston Villa | White Hart Lane |
| | | Report | Les Smith (18'), Derek Pace (52'), Jimmy Dugdale (64') |

| 14 April 1956 40 | Aston Villa | 3–2 | Sheffield United | Villa Park |
| | Derek Pace (1', 34', 40') | Report |

| 21 April 1956 41 | Preston North End | 0–1 | Aston Villa | Deepdale |
| | | Report | Derek Pace (73') |

| 28 April 1956 42 | Aston Villa | 3–0 | West Bromwich Albion | Villa Park |
| | Les Smith (12', 27'), Own goal (39') | Report |

== FA Cup ==
=== Third round ===
At this stage the 44 Second Division and First Division (top-flight) teams entered the competition.

The matches were scheduled to be played on Saturday, 7 January 1956, though four were postponed until later that week because of bad weather. Four matches were drawn, with replays taking place later that week. Boston United, Worksop Town, Bedford Town and Burton Albion were the last non-league sides left in the competition.

| Tie no | Home team | Score | Away team | Date | Attendance | Summary |
|---|---|---|---|---|---|---|
| 5 | Aston Villa | 1–1 | Hull City | 7 January 1956 | 33,284 | |
| Replay | Hull City | 1–2 | Aston Villa | 12 January 1956 | 24,253 | |

=== Fourth round ===
The matches were played on Saturday, 28 January 1956. Four matches were drawn, three of which were settled in a single replay. The fourth, between Burnley and Chelsea, was eventually decided in Chelsea's favour in the fourth replay, played 18 days after the date of the original tie.

| Tie no | Home team | Score | Away team | Date | Attendance | Summary |
|---|---|---|---|---|---|---|
| 14 | Arsenal | 4–1 | Aston Villa | 28 January 1956 | 43,052 | |

== See also ==
- List of Aston Villa F.C. records and statistics
