= 1949 Scottish League Cup final (March) =

- Event: 1948–49 Scottish League Cup
Rangers	Raith Rovers
2	0
- Date: 12 March 1949
- Venue: Hampden Park, Glasgow
- Attendance: 57,450

The 1948–49 Scottish League Cup final was played on 12 March 1949, at Hampden Park in Glasgow and was the final of the third Scottish League Cup competition. The final was contested by Rangers and Raith Rovers. Rangers won the match 2–0 thanks to goals by Torrance Gillick and Willie Paton.

== Match details ==
12 March 1949

Rangers	2–0	Raith Rovers
Gillick; Paton

Hampden Park, Glasgow
Attendance: 57,450

RANGERS :
GK	Bobby Brown
FB	George Young
FB	Jock Shaw (c)
RH	Ian McColl
CH	Willie Woodburn
LH	Sammy Cox
RW	Torrance Gillick
IF	Willie Paton
CF	Willie Thornton
IF	Jimmy Duncanson
LW	Eddie Rutherford
Manager:
Bill Struth

RAITH ROVERS :
GK	Doug Westland
FB	Malcolm McLure
FB	Willie McNaught (c)
RH	Andy Young
CH	Harry Colville
LH	Andy Leigh
RW	Johnny Maule
IF	Allan Collins
CF	Willie Penman
IF	Tom Brady
LW	Frank Joyner
Manager:
Bert Herdman
