= 1961 Football League Cup final =

- Event: 1960–61 Football League Cup
Rotherham United	Aston Villa
2	3
- on aggregate

First leg
Rotherham United	Aston Villa
2	0
- Date: 22 August 1961
- Venue: Millmoor, Rotherham
- Attendance: 12,226

Second leg
Aston Villa	Rotherham United
3	0
- After extra time
- Date: 5 September 1961
- Venue: Villa Park, Birmingham
- Attendance: 31,302

The 1961 Football League Cup final was the inaugural League Cup final. It was contested by Rotherham United and Aston Villa over two legs. Aston Villa won 3–2 on aggregate.

Due to fixture congestion, the second leg was not played until after the start of the 1961–62 season. As a result, Villa began their defence of the trophy just eight days after winning it. Though all League clubs were eligible to participate, Arsenal, Sheffield Wednesday, Tottenham Hotspur, West Bromwich Albion and Wolverhampton Wanderers did not enter. The prize money for winning the competition was £750. The two clubs would not play each other again until they met in the same competition in August 2013. Both clubs received first round byes.

== Details ==
=== First leg ===
22 August 1961

Rotherham United	2–0	Aston Villa
Webster 51'; Kirkman 55'

Millmoor, Rotherham
Attendance: 12,226
Referee: K.A. Collinge

Rotherham United	Aston Villa

1	(England) Roy Ironside
2	(England) Peter Perry
3	(England) Lol Morgan
4	(England) Roy Lambert (c)
5	(England) Peter Madden
6	(England) Ken Waterhouse
7	(England) Barry Webster
8	(England) Don Weston
9	(England) Ken Houghton
10	(England) Alan Kirkman
11	(England) Keith Bambridge
Manager:
(Scotland) Tom Johnston

1	(England) Nigel Sims
2	(England) Stan Lynn
3	(England) Gordon Lee
4	(Wales) Vic Crowe (c)
5	(England) Jimmy Dugdale
6	(England) Alan Deakin
7	(Scotland) Jimmy MacEwan
8	(Scotland) Bobby Thomson
9	(England) Ralph Brown
10	(Scotland) Ron Wylie
11	(Northern Ireland) Peter McParland
Manager:
(England) Joe Mercer

=== Second leg ===
5 September 1961

Aston Villa	3–0 (a.e.t.)	Rotherham United
O'Neill 67'; Burrows 69'; McParland 109'

Villa Park, Birmingham
Attendance: 31,202
Referee: C.W. Kingston

Aston Villa	Rotherham United

1	(England) Geoff Sidebottom
2	(England) John Neal
3	(England) Gordon Lee
4	(Wales) Vic Crowe (c)
5	(England) Jimmy Dugdale
6	(England) Alan Deakin
7	(Scotland) Jimmy MacEwan
8	(England) Alan O'Neill
9	(Northern Ireland) Peter McParland
10	(Scotland) Bobby Thomson
11	(England) Harry Burrows
Manager:
(England) Joe Mercer

1	(England) Roy Ironside
2	(England) Peter Perry
3	(England) Lol Morgan
4	(England) Roy Lambert (c)
5	(England) Peter Madden
6	(England) Ken Waterhouse
7	(England) Barry Webster
8	(England) Don Weston
9	(England) Ken Houghton
10	(England) Alan Kirkman
11	(England) Keith Bambridge
Manager:
(Scotland) Tom Johnston

== Road to the final ==
=== Aston Villa ===
Round 1		Bye	
Round 2	Aston Villa	4–0	Huddersfield Town
Round 3	Preston North End	3–3	Aston Villa
Round 3 replay	Aston Villa	3–1	Preston North End
Round 4	Aston Villa	3–3	Plymouth Argyle
Round 4 replay	Plymouth Argyle	0–0	Aston Villa
Round 4 2nd replay	Plymouth Argyle	3–5	Aston Villa
Quarter-final	Aston Villa	3–0	Wrexham
Semi-final (1st leg)	Burnley	2–2	Aston Villa
Semi-final (2nd leg)	Aston Villa	1–1	Burnley
Semi-final replay	Aston Villa	2–1	Burnley
	(at Old Trafford)		

=== Rotherham United ===
Round 1		Bye	
Round 2	Leicester City	1–2	Rotherham United
Round 3	Rotherham United	2–0	Bristol Rovers
Round 4	Bolton Wanderers	0–2	Rotherham United
Quarter-final	Rotherham United	3–0	Portsmouth
Semi-final (1st leg)	Rotherham United	3–2	Shrewsbury Town
Semi-final (2nd leg)	Shrewsbury Town	1–1	Rotherham United
	(Rotherham United win 4–3 on aggregate)		
