= 1907–08 Aston Villa F.C. season =

English football club season

Aston Villa
1907–08 season
- President: Joseph Ansell
- Chairman: Frederick Rinder
- Manager: George Ramsay
- First Division: 2nd
- FA Cup: 3rd round

Second City Derby
- 11--4--4

The 1907–08 English football season was Aston Villa's 20th season in the Football League. Villa competed in the top flight of English football at the time. The season fell in what was to be called Villa's golden era.

Bobby Evans continued to add to his tally of Welsh caps. There were debuts for Charlie Wallace, Bert Turner, Joseph Wilcox, George Reeves, Tom Lyons, Walter Kimberley, Roly Harper (2) and Peter Kyle.

== Football League ==
Pos	Team	Pld	W	D	L	GF	GA	GAv	Pts
1	Manchester United (C)	38	23	6	9	81	48	1.688	52
2	Aston Villa	38	17	9	12	77	59	1.305	43
3	Manchester City	38	16	11	11	62	54	1.148	43
4	Newcastle United	38	15	12	11	65	54	1.204	42
5	The Wednesday	38	19	4	15	73	64	1.141	42

Source: World Football
Rules for classification: 1) Points; 2) Goal average; 3) Goals scored
(C) Champions

=== Matches ===
2 September 1907	Aston Villa	1–4	Manchester United	Villa Park
	Harry Hampton (pen)	Report
Note: A year after playing 20 league games in his first season, 20-year-old Chris Buckley breaks his ankle on the opening day keeping him out of the game for over a year. Buckley would later become Chairman of Aston Villa. With no substitues Villa played on with ten men.

7 September 1907	Blackburn Rovers	2–0	Aston Villa	Ewood Park
		Report

9 September 1907	Aston Villa	1–0	Sunderland	Villa Park
	Samuel Greenhalgh	Report

14 September 1907	Aston Villa	2–0	Bolton Wanderers	Villa Park
	Harry Hampton (2)	Report

21 September 1907	Birmingham	2–3	Aston Villa	St Andrew's
		Report	Jimmy Cantrell; Bobby Evans; Albert Hall
Note: In the Second City Derby, both teams won their away fixtures. Birmingham would be relegated this year and the teams would not meet again in top flight competition until their promotion fifteen years later.

28 September 1907	Aston Villa	0–2	Everton	Villa Park
		Report

5 October 1907	Sunderland	3–0	Aston Villa	Roker Park
		Report

12 October 1907	Aston Villa	0–1	Arsenal	Villa Park
		Report

19 October 1907	Sheffield Wednesday	2–3	Aston Villa	Owlerton
		Report	Harry Hampton; Albert Hall (pen)

26 October 1907	Aston Villa	4–4	Bristol City	Villa Park
	Harry Hampton (2); Joe Bache (2)	Report

2 November 1907	Notts County	0–3	Aston Villa	Trent Bridge
		Report	Alec Logan (2); Joe Bache

9 November 1907	Aston Villa	2–2	Manchester City	Villa Park
	Harry Hampton (2)	Report

16 November 1907	Preston North End	3–0	Aston Villa	Deepdale
		Report

23 November 1907	Aston Villa	2–2	Bury	Villa Park
	Albert Hall; Alec Logan	Report

30 November 1907	Aston Villa	3–3	Newcastle United	Villa Park
	Alec Logan; Joe Bache; Albert Hall	Report

7 December 1907	Liverpool	5–0	Aston Villa	Anfield
		Report

14 December 1907	Aston Villa	6–0	Middlesbrough	Villa Park
	Jimmy Cantrell (2); Alec Logan (2); Albert Hall (2)	Report

21 December 1907	Sheffield United	1–1	Aston Villa	Bramall Lane
		Report	Albert Hall

25 December 1907	Aston Villa	4–0	Nottingham Forest	Villa Park
	Joe Bache (4)	Report

26 December 1907	Nottingham Forest	2–2	Aston Villa	City Ground
		Report	Jimmy Cantrell (2)

28 December 1907	Aston Villa	0–0	Chelsea	Villa Park
		Report

4 January 1908	Aston Villa	1–1	Blackburn Rovers	Villa Park
	Joe Bache	Report

18 January 1908	Aston Villa	2–3	Birmingham	Villa Park
	Alec Logan; Albert Hall
Note: In the Second City Derby, both teams won their away fixtures. Birmingham would be relegated this year and the teams would not meet again in top flight competition until their promotion fifteen years later.

25 January 1908	Everton	1–0	Aston Villa	Goodison Park

8 February 1908	Arsenal	0–1	Aston Villa	Manor Ground
			Joe Bache

15 February 1908	Aston Villa	5–0	Sheffield Wednesday	Villa Park
	Jimmy Cantrell; Joe Bache (2); Harry Hampton

2 March 1908	Aston Villa	5–1	Notts County	Villa Park
	Joe Bache (3); George Reeves; Albert Hall

7 March 1908	Manchester City	3–2	Aston Villa	Hyde Road
			Harry Hampton; George Reeves

11 March 1908	Bristol City	2–2	Aston Villa	Ashton Gate
			George Reeves; Harry Hampton

14 March 1908	Aston Villa	3–0	Preston North End	Villa Park
	Charlie Wallace (2); George Reeves

21 March 1908	Bury	2–1	Aston Villa	Gigg Lane
			Joe Bache

4 April 1908	Aston Villa	5–1	Liverpool	Villa Park
	Harry Hampton (2); Joe Bache (3)

8 April 1908	Newcastle United	2–5	Aston Villa	St James' Park
			Charlie Wallace (2); Joe Bache (2); George Reeves

11 April 1908	Middlesbrough	0–1	Aston Villa	Ayresome Park
			Harry Hampton

17 April 1908	Bolton Wanderers	3–1	Aston Villa	Burnden Park
			Joe Bache

18 April 1908	Aston Villa	1–0	Sheffield United	Villa Park
	Harry Hampton

20 April 1908	Manchester United	1–2	Aston Villa	Bank Street
			Albert Hall (2)

25 April 1908	Chelsea	1–3	Aston Villa	Stamford Bridge
			Joe Bache; Albert Hall (2)

Source: avfchistory.co.uk

== FA Cup ==
=== First round ===
36 of the 40 clubs from the First and Second divisions joined the 12 clubs who came through the qualifying rounds. Of the League sides not exempt to this round, Clapton Orient was again entered in the preliminary round, but this time won through to the third qualifying round before also losing to Southend United. Glossop, Chesterfield and Oldham were all entered in the fifth qualifying round. Sixteen Southern League sides were also exempt to the first round.

Tie no	Home team	Score	Away team	Date
8	Aston Villa	3–0	Stockport County	11 January 1908

=== Second round ===
The sixteen second round matches were played on Saturday 1 February 1908. Five matches were drawn, with the replays taking place in the following midweek. One of these, the Stoke against Gainsborough Trinity match, went to a second replay the following week.

Tie no	Home team	Score	Away team	Date
5	Aston Villa	3–0	Hull City	1 February 1908

=== Third round ===
The eight third-round matches were scheduled for Saturday 22 February 1908. T

Tie no	Home team	Score	Away team	Date
2	Aston Villa	0–2	Manchester United	22 February 1908
