= Ken Fencott =

English footballer

Personal information
- Full name: Kenneth Sydney Fencott
- Date of birth: 27 December 1943
- Place of birth: Walsall, England
- Date of death: November 11, 2023 (aged 79)
- Place of death: Walsall, England
- Position: Forward

Youth career
- 1959–1961: Aston Villa

Senior career*
Years	Team	Apps	(Gls)
1961–1964	Aston Villa	3	(0)
1964–1967	Lincoln City	73	(13)
1967	Tamworth		
Total		+76	(+13)
- * Club domestic league appearances and goals

Kenneth Sydney Fencott (27 December 1943 – 11 November 2023), also known as Kenny Fencott, was an English footballer who scored 13 goals from 76 League appearances in the Football League playing as a forward for Aston Villa and Lincoln City. He went on to play non-league football for Tamworth. Fencott played for Walsall Boys, Staffordshire & Birmingham County Football Associations before joining the Villa youth system in 1959.

The 17-year-old became the 492nd player to represent the First Division club when he made his Villa debut under Joe Mercer on 18 Nov 1961 in a 1-1 draw away to Bolton. He helped Villa reach the 1963 League Cup final playing two matches in the knockout rounds.

After the rule allowing substitutions was introduced to the Football League in 1965, Fencott was named on the bench for the opening match of the 1965–66 Lincoln season, but his services were not required; the first substitute used by the club was Roy Chapman in the second match of that season.
