= Jimmy Cantrell =

English footballer

Personal information
- Full name: James Cantrell
- Date of birth: 7 May 1882
- Place of birth: Sheepbridge, England
- Date of death: 31 July 1960 (aged 78)
- Place of death: Basford, England
- Height: 5 ft 8 in (1.73 m)
- Position: Centre forward

Senior career*
| Years | Team | Apps | (Gls) |
| 1904–1907 | Aston Villa | 48 | (22) |
| 1907–1912 | Notts County | 131 | (64) |
| 1912–1922 | Tottenham Hotspur | 160 | (74) |
| 1923–1925 | Sutton Town | | |
- * Club domestic league appearances and goals

James Cantrell (7 May 1882 – 31 July 1960) was an English professional footballer who played as a forward for Aston Villa, Notts County, Tottenham Hotspur and Sutton Town.

== Football career ==
Cantrell began his professional career at Aston Villa. The inside forward played in 48 matches and found the net on 22 occasions for the club between 1904 and 1907. He moved to Notts County in 1907 where he was converted into the centre forward position. Top scorer in his three seasons at County he maintained a goal every other match ratio in 131 matches and scoring 64 goals in his time there. Tottenham Hotspur impressed by his goal scoring paid a substantial sum for his services in 1912. In a career interrupted by the First World War Cantrell lead the Spurs forward line that won the Football League Second Division in 1919-20 with a then record 70 points. He went on to collect a winner's medal in the 1921 FA Cup Final at the age of 38. He played his last match against Birmingham City just short of his 40th birthday making him the oldest Spurs player to feature in a League match. This record lasted until 6 May 2012 when Brad Friedel appeared for Tottenham Hotspur against Aston Villa in the Premier League. Cantrell remains the oldest outfield player to appear for Spurs. Cantrell played 176 times and scored on 84 occasions in all competitions between 1912 and 1922. He joined Midland League club Sutton Town on 8 October 1923, retiring in 1925.

== Honours ==
Tottenham Hotspur

- Football League Second Division: 1919–20
- FA Cup: 1920–21

== After football ==
Cantrell returned to Nottingham where he became a golf professional. He died in Basford in 1960.
