= Stark's Park =

Football stadium in Kirkcaldy, Scotland

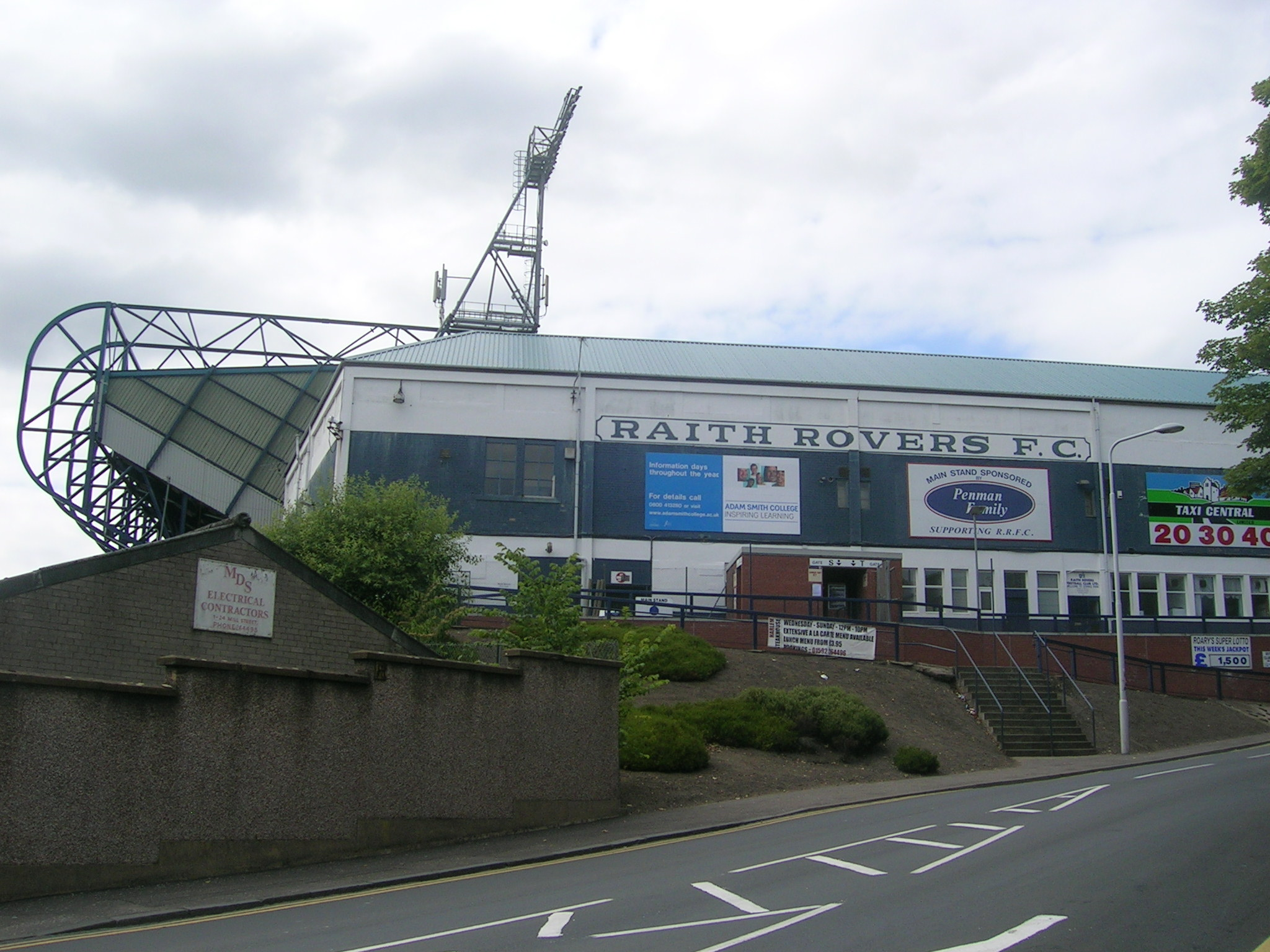
- The Main and South stands of Stark's Park

- Location in Fife
- Location: Kirkcaldy, Scotland
- Coordinates: 56°05′59″N 3°10′06″W
- Owner: Raith Rovers F.C.
- Capacity: 8,867 (all seated)
- Surface: Artificial Turf
- Public transit: Kirkcaldy

Construction
- Opened: 1891

Tenant
- Raith Rovers F.C.

Stark's Park is a football stadium in Kirkcaldy, Scotland. It is the home ground of Raith Rovers, who have played there since 1891. The ground has an all-seated capacity of 8,867.

== History ==
Raith started using the ground in 1891 and it seats 8,867. It is located in Kirkcaldy, Fife. The park can clearly be seen from the railway line on the route between Edinburgh and Aberdeen.

The unusual L-shaped main stand that houses the players dressing facilities and the supporters lounge was designed by the renowned Grandstand architect Archibald Leitch and was built with part funding from the sale of Alex James to Preston North End in 1925. Other funding came from a loan scheme that was not finally paid off until 1946. The terracing was open to the elements except for a covered enclosure affectionately known as the "coo shed" which stood opposite the main stand and ran approximately two-thirds of the length of the pitch. The ash and railway sleeper terracing which surrounded all sides of the ground except the stand enclosure was replaced with new concrete works in the north and south enclosures behind the goals. This work being carried out in the 1950s when a shed was erected at either end to give partial covering to the supporters. Typical of several football grounds of the time the club sold advertising space on the pitched asbestos roofs of the covered areas to companies such as R'bt Hutchison & Co (Youma Bread), The Evening Dispatch, Nelsons Cigarettes and Barnett & Morton Ltd, the local ironmonger who had erected the sheds. Shortly after the above terrace was upgraded, four large floodlighting pylons similar to those at Tynecastle Park were erected to allow evening midweek fixtures to be played all year round. Most of the cost of the above work was covered (as had become the norm) by the sale of assets, the most notable of those being Jackie Stewart to Birmingham City, Jim Baxter to Rangers and Jimmy MacEwan to Aston Villa, the latter deal also leading to Villa travelling north to play in the first match under the new lights.

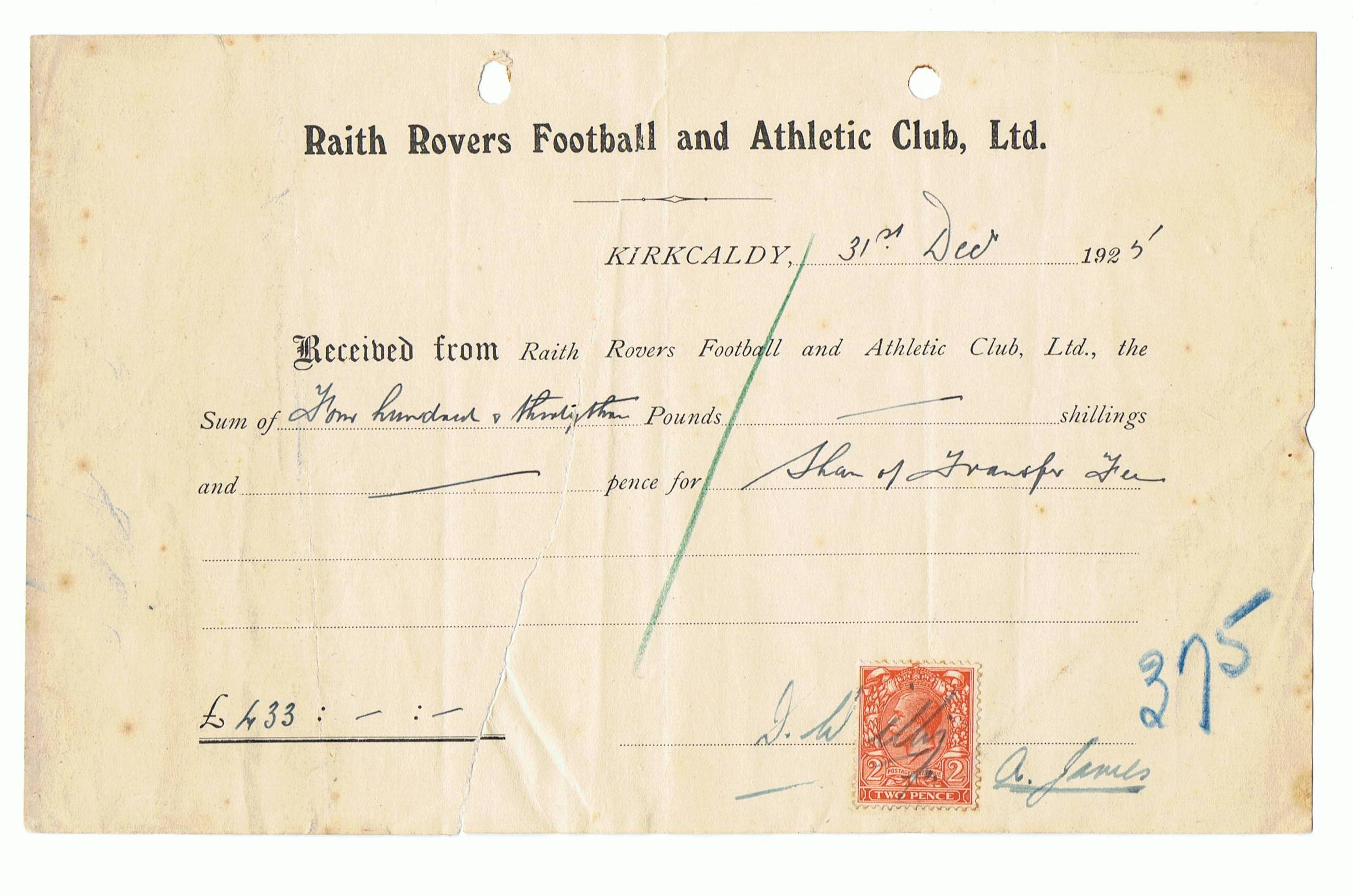
Alex James' share of the transfer fee which helped fund the main stand.

The ground then remained unchanged for almost thirty years until the departure of a modern-day Alex James in the form of striker Andy Harrow who in 1981 was sold to Luton Town. The sale of this latest asset allowed the board to demolish the antiquated railway enclosure and build a 1,000 seat stand on the south side and terraced concrete steps at the north side. This was how the ground was to remain until more redevelopment in the early 1990s. Anticipating a swift return after relegation from the Premier league in 1992 the board spent £250,000 on upgrading the north and south ends of the ground when the 1950s concrete was taken up and new terracing and crush barriers erected, although the sheds remained. Though the board's confidence in achieving promotion was well founded the money spent was to prove a poor investment as after the last home game of season 1995–96 the bulldozers returned and demolished both ends of the ground and the railway enclosure.

Barr Construction were appointed to redevelop the stadium. Two 3,370 seat stands with inbuilt floodlight towers behind each goal and a 1000-seat stand to join onto the 1980s railway (new) stand were erected. This work brought the ground capacity up to a creditable 10,700 all seater. During all of the above changes the main pavilion remained totally unchanged with its asbestos roof, concrete steps and wooden seats and benches. A new metal roof and plastic seating were finally installed in 1999 which slightly reduced the spectator capacity to 8,473. As of the 2017/2018 season the railway stand is to be converted into a standing support section adding to the total capacity which will become 11,198.

In the 2018 close season, an artificial pitch was laid.

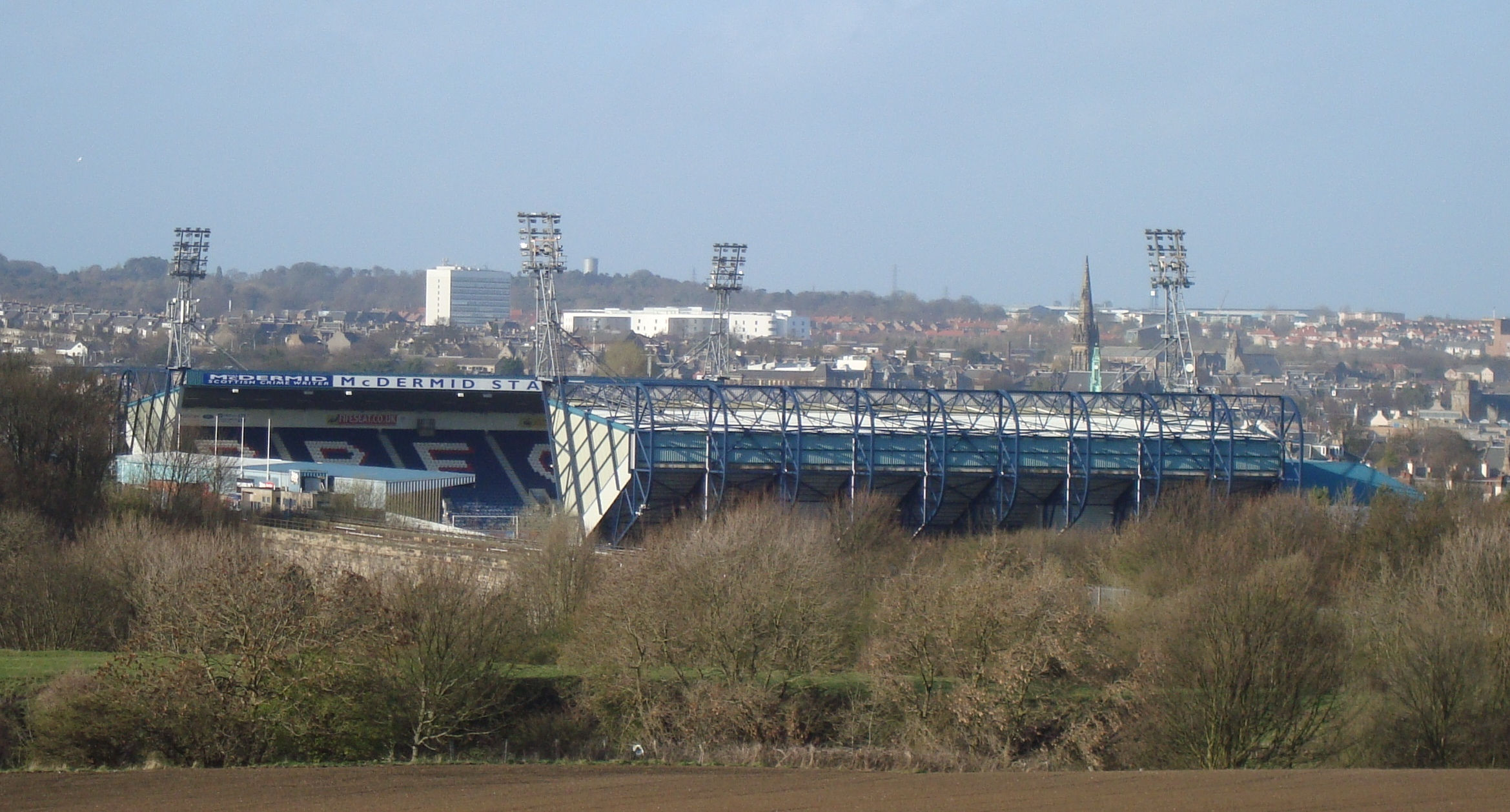
Stark's Park from the south.

== Nickname ==
The ground is often referred to by fans as the San Starko, in jesting reference to the San Siro.
