= Terry Morrall =

English footballer

Personal information
- Full name: Terence Stephen Morrall
- Date of birth: 24 November 1938 (age 87)
- Place of birth: Smethwick, Staffordshire, England
- Position: Defender

Youth career
- 1953–1955: Aston Villa

Senior career*
Years	Team	Apps	(Gls)
1955–1961	Aston Villa	8	(0)
1961–1963	Shrewsbury Town	31	(0)
1963–1965	Wrexham	42	(0)
1965–1966	Southport	1	(0)
- Stourbridge
- * Club domestic league appearances and goals

Terence Stephen Morrall (born 24 November 1938) is an English former footballer, who played as a defender. He was a part of the Aston Villa squad which won the Football League Second Division in the 1959–60 season.

== Career ==
Morrall started his career with Aston Villa, coming up through their youth system. He appeared 3 times in their 1959–60 season where they won the Second Division, and appeared once in the first ever staging of the League Cup in which Aston Villa ultimately became the inaugural champions. However, he left Aston Villa at the end of the 1960–61 season

Morrall would move to Shrewsbury Town, Wrexham and Southport in the league over the next few years, however in 1966 he would move to non-league football with Stourbridge.

== Honours ==
Aston Villa

- Football League Second Division: 1959–60
- League Cup: 1960–61
