= Nigel Sims =

English footballer (1931–2018)

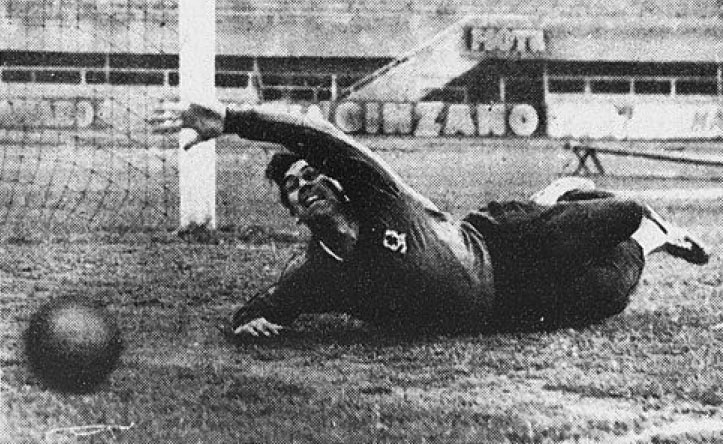
- Sims in training in 1959

Personal information
- Date of birth: 9 August 1931
- Place of birth: Coton in the Elms, Derbyshire, England
- Date of death: 6 January 2018 (aged 86)
- Position: Goalkeeper

Senior career*
Years	Team	Apps	(Gls)
194x–1948	Stapenhill		
1948–1956	Wolverhampton Wanderers	38	(0)
1956–1964	Aston Villa	264	(0)
1963	Toronto City		
1964–1965	Peterborough United	16	(0)
1967	Toronto Falcons	2	(0)
- Toronto Italia
Total		320	(0)
- * Club domestic league appearances and goals

David Nigel Sims (9 August 1931 – 6 January 2018) was an English footballer who played as a goalkeeper in the Football League for Wolverhampton Wanderers, Aston Villa and Peterborough United in the 1950s and 1960s.

Sims was born at Coton in the Elms, Derbyshire. He joined Wolverhampton Wanderers from Stapenhill in August 1948 as understudy to Bert Williams, and made his first-team debut on 18 April 1949 in a 1–1 draw with Sheffield United in the First Division. While a National Serviceman in 1950, Sims played for the Army in a representative match against an Irish Football Association XI. During his eight seasons at Wolves he only made 39 appearances.

Sims transferred to Midlands rivals Aston Villa in March 1956. He made his debut against Burnley that same month. He was on the winning side in the 1957 FA Cup final, in which Villa beat Manchester United 2–1, followed three years later by a Second Division winners' medal. In 1961, he helped Villa lift the inaugural League Cup. He played representative matches for the Football League, and in 1958, was the first winner of Aston Villa supporters' "Terrace Trophy".

In September 1964, having lost his place in the Villa side, he transferred to Peterborough United. He appeared only sixteen times for them before trying his luck in Canada, having already spent a summer with Toronto City in the Eastern Canada Professional Soccer League. He appeared twice for the Toronto Falcons in the National Professional Soccer League, and also played for Toronto Italia.

In Safe Hands, a book about his footballing memories, was published in August 2012.

== Honours ==
Aston Villa

- FA Cup: 1956–57
- Football League Cup: 1960–61; runner-up: 1962–63
