= Ralph Brown (footballer) =

English footballer

Personal information
- Full name: Ralph Brown
- Date of birth: 26 February 1944
- Place of birth: Ilkeston, England
- Date of death: 16 December 2024 (aged 80)
- Position: Forward

Senior career*
Years	Team	Apps	(Gls)
1960–1961	Aston Villa	0	(0)
1962–1963	Notts County	18	(3)
1963	Nuneaton Borough		
1964	Ilkeston Town		
Total		18	(3)
- * Club domestic league appearances and goals

Ralph Brown (26 February 1944 - 16th December 2024) was an English former footballer who played for Aston Villa and Notts County. His only appearances for Aston Villa came in the two-legged 1961 Football League Cup final.

== Honours ==
Aston Villa

- Football League Cup: 1960–61
