= Keith Bambridge =

English footballer (1935–2021)

Personal information
- Full name: Keith Graham Bambridge
- Date of birth: 1 September 1935
- Place of birth: Rawmarsh, Rotherham, England
- Date of death: 15 July 2021 (aged 85)
- Height: 5 ft 3 1/2 in (1.61 m)
- Position: Outside left

Senior career*
Years	Team	Apps	(Gls)
1957–1963	Rotherham United	162	(15)
1964	Darlington	6	(0)
1964–1965	Halifax Town	9	(1)
Total		177	(16)
- * Club domestic league appearances and goals

Keith Graham Bambridge (1 September 1935 – 15 July 2021) was an English footballer who played as an outside left in the Football League for Rotherham United, Darlington and Halifax Town. He was a member of Rotherham United's 1961 Football League Cup final squad.

Bambridge died on 15 July 2021, at the age of 85.

== Honours ==
Rotherham United

- Football League Cup runner-up: 1960–61
