= Johnny Urquhart =

Scottish footballer and administrator

Personal information
- Date of birth: 3 February 1925
- Place of birth: Kirkcaldy, Scotland
- Date of death: 16 December 2008 (aged 83)
- Position: Left winger

Youth career
- Kirkcaldy Old Boys

Senior career*
Years	Team	Apps	(Gls)
1946–1955	Heart of Midlothian	156	(48)
1950	→ Raith Rovers (loan)	4	(3)
1955–1962	Raith Rovers	169	(50)
Total		329	(101)

International career
1954	Scottish League XI	1	(1)
- * Club domestic league appearances and goals

Johnny Urquhart (3 February 1925 – 16 December 2008) was a Scottish football player and administrator.

== Early life ==
Urquhart was born in Kirkcaldy, Scotland. While at Kirkcaldy High School, he played football. At the same time, he also played for the local Boys' Brigade team.

== Career ==
After school, Urquhart played in the local juvenile league for Kirkcaldy Old Boys. He then had trials with Rovers and East Fife. His scoring debut in maroon was 14 October 1944.

He played for Raith Rovers in the 1949–50 season, Heart of Midlothian from 1951 to 1955, and once played for the Scottish League XI. He was on the 1954 Heart of Midlothian team which won the League Cup. While in Tynecastle, he played in 248 games and scored 79 goals.

After retiring as a player in the early 1960s, Urquhart served Raith Rovers in several roles, including coach, scout, director, club chairman and president.

== Personal life ==
Urquhart married Ena with whom he had three sons: Brian, John, and Alan. He owned linoleum, carpet, and flooring firm in Kirkcaldy.
