= Brian Handley =

English footballer

Personal information
- Full name: Brian Handley
- Date of birth: 21 June 1936
- Place of birth: Wakefield, England
- Date of death: 5 March 1982 (aged 45)
- Position: Centre-forward

Senior career*
Years	Team	Apps	(Gls)
–1957	Goole Town		
1957–1960	Aston Villa	3	(0)
1960–1964	Torquay United	80	(32)
1964–1966	Bridgwater Town		
1966	Rochdale	3	(0)
- * Club domestic league appearances and goals

Brian Handley (21 June 1936 – 5 March 1982) was an English football centre-forward. He was born in Wakefield, West Yorkshire.

Handley joined Aston Villa in September 1957 from Goole Town, but had to wait until the 1959–60 season for his league debut. He moved to Torquay United in September 1960, scoring 32 goals in 82 games for Eric Webber's side before dropping into non-league football.

In February 1966, he joined Rochdale from Bridgwater Town, but played only three times before leaving league football once more.
