= Geoff Sidebottom =

English footballer

Personal information
- Full name: Geoffrey Sidebottom
- Date of birth: 26 December 1936
- Place of birth: Mapplewell, Yorkshire, England
- Date of death: 3 November 2008 (aged 71)
- Place of death: Scunthorpe, England
- Position: Goalkeeper

Youth career
- Mapplewell Village Youth
- Wath Wanderers

Senior career*
Years	Team	Apps	(Gls)
1954–1961	Wolverhampton Wanderers	28	(0)
1961–1965	Aston Villa	70	(0)
1965–1968	Scunthorpe United	59	(0)
1967–1968	New York Generals	44	(0)
1969–1971	Brighton & Hove Albion	40	(0)
- * Club domestic league appearances and goals

Geoffrey Sidebottom (26 December 1936 – 3 November 2008) was an English professional footballer who played as a goalkeeper.

== Career ==
Sidebottom joined Wolverhampton Wanderers from their Yorkshire-based nursery club Wath Wanderers in 1954. Due to the talent of Bert Williams and Malcolm Finlayson, he had to wait until 1 November 1958 to make his first team debut, in a 2–1 defeat to West Bromwich Albion.

He managed 35 appearances for Wolves, including playing in the 1960 Charity Shield, before moving to their Midlands neighbours Aston Villa in February 1961. He broke through to their starting XI and played in their 1960–61 League Cup triumph over Rotherham United.

After 88 games in total for Villa, he joined Scunthorpe United in January 1965 and was a near-ever present in the 1965–66 season for them before losing his spot to the emerging Ray Clemence.

He had a spell playing in America with the New York Generals during 1967–68 when signed by his former Scunthorpe manager Freddie Goodwin. He later followed Goodwin back to England to join Brighton and Hove Albion in January 1969 before retiring in 1971 due to a head injury sustained in a FA cup tie against Walsall. Kicked in the head twice whilst diving at the strikers feet, the second time also heavily contacting the upright, the resultant injury left him with double vision. Sidebottom then began a new career as a Window Cleaner in Shoreham-by-Sea.

Sidebottom appeared on the US game show What's My Line! which aired on CBS on 11 June 1967.

He died on 3 November 2008, aged 71.

== Honours ==
Aston Villa

- Football League Cup: 1960–61
