= Walter Kimberley =

English footballer

Personal information
- Full name: Walter Kimberley
- Date of birth: 28 September 1884
- Place of birth: Aston, England
- Date of death: 22 April 1917 (aged 32)
- Place of death: Aston, England
- Positions: Left back; right half

Youth career
- Gower Street School
- Gravelly Hill Schools

Senior career*
Years	Team	Apps	(Gls)
- Tower Unity
- Selly Oak St Mary's
- Coldstream Guards
- Aston Manor
1906–1912	Aston Villa	7	(0)
1912–1914	Coventry City	21	(2)
1914	Walsall		
- * Club domestic league appearances and goals

Walter Kimberley (28 September 1884 – 22 April 1917) was an English professional footballer who played in the Football League for Aston Villa as a left back and right half.

== Personal life ==
As of 1901 and 1904, Kimberley worked as an engraver and a packer respectively. While playing for Coventry City, Kimberley worked at the Coventry Ordnance Works. An army reservist since 1904, Kimberley rejoined the Coldstream Guards in August 1914, after Britain's entry into the First World War and was appointed lance corporal. The following month, he was captured by the Germans at Maubeuge during the First Battle of the Marne and spent two years as a prisoner of war in camps at Döberitz, Dyrotz and Cottbus. Beginning with a six-month stay in hospital with laryngitis and bronchitis, Kimberley's health declined during his internment and he was repatriated to Britain in August 1916 with pulmonary tuberculosis. He was immediately discharged from the army and fell into severe ill heath, permanently losing his voice and dying at home in Aston on 22 April 1917. Kimberley was buried in Witton Cemetery, Birmingham. He was married and had two children, one of whom died in infancy.

== Career statistics ==
Appearances and goals by club, season and competition
Club	Season	League			FA Cup		Total	
Club	Season	Division	Apps	Goals	Apps	Goals	Apps	Goals
Aston Villa	1907–08	First Division	4	0	0	0	4	0
Aston Villa	1908–09	First Division	3	0	0	0	3	0
Aston Villa	Total		7	0	0	0	7	0
Coventry City	1912–13	Southern League First Division	10	1	1	0	11	1
Coventry City	1913–14	Southern League First Division	11	0	1	0	12	0
Coventry City	Total		21	1	2	0	23	1
Career total			28	1	2	0	30	1
