= Wilson Briggs =

Scottish footballer

Personal information
- Full name: Wilson Waite Briggs
- Date of birth: 15 May 1942
- Place of birth: Gorebridge, Scotland
- Date of death: February 2005 (aged 62)
- Place of death: Birmingham, England
- Position: Defender

Youth career
- –1959: Arniston Rangers
- 1959–1961: Aston Villa

Senior career*
Years	Team	Apps	(Gls)
1961–1963	Aston Villa	2	(0)
1968–1969	Falkirk	0	(0)
1969–1970	East Fife	3	(0)
1970–1971	Raith Rovers	1	(0)
Total		6	(0)
- * Club domestic league appearances and goals

Wilson Waite Briggs (15 July 1942 – February 2005) was a Scottish footballer who played in the Football League for Aston Villa.

Briggs was spotted by Villa scout Jimmy Emson and joined Aston Villa in August 1959, travelling down from Edinburgh on the train with Charlie Aitken.
