= George Ashfield =

English footballer

Personal information
- Full name: George Owen Ashfield
- Date of birth: 7 April 1934
- Place of birth: Manchester, England
- Date of death: March 1985 (age 50)
- Position: Full back

Youth career
- Stockport County

Senior career*
Years	Team	Apps	(Gls)
1951–1954	Stockport County	0	(0)
1954–1959	Aston Villa	9	(0)
1959	Chester	5	(0)
1959–?	Rhyl		
- * Club domestic league appearances and goals

George Ashfield (7 April 1934 – March 1985) was an English footballer.

Ashfield began his career with Stockport County without making any league appearances before going on to play 14 games in The Football League for top–flight side Aston Villa and Division Four club Chester in the late 1950s. After leaving Chester he dropped into Non-League football with Rhyl.
