= Don Weston =

English footballer

Personal information
- Full name: Donald Patrick Weston
- Date of birth: 6 March 1936
- Place of birth: Mansfield, England
- Date of death: 20 January 2007 (aged 70)
- Place of death: Mansfield, England
- Position: Centre forward

Youth career
- –: Leeds United

Senior career*
| Years | Team | Apps | (Gls) |
| 1958–1960 | Wrexham | 42 | (21) |
| 1960 | Birmingham City | 23 | (3) |
| 1960–1962 | Rotherham United | 74 | (23) |
| 1962–1965 | Leeds United | 68 | (24) |
| 1965–1966 | Huddersfield Town | 22 | (7) |
| 1966–1968 | Wrexham | 42 | (19) |
| 1968–1969 | Chester | 3 | (0) |
| 1969–1970 | Altrincham | 16 | (9) |
| – | Bethesda Athletic | | |
| Total | | 274 | (97) |
- * Club domestic league appearances and goals

Donald Patrick Weston (6 March 1936 – 20 January 2007) was an English professional footballer who played as a centre forward for many football teams during the 1950s and 1960s.

== Playing career ==
Weston first joined Leeds United as a 16-year-old amateur but did not sign a professional contract and later entered National Service at an army camp in North Wales. He was spotted by local Third Division club Wrexham and signed a professional contract with them after completing his military service. He scored 21 goals in 42 appearances for Wrexham in the 1958–59 and 1959–60 seasons before joining Birmingham City for a fee of £15,000 in January 1960 and then Rotherham United for £10,000 in December 1961. He scored 21 goals in 76 appearances, helping Rotherham United to reach the 1961 Football League Cup final, which they lost 3–2 on aggregate to Aston Villa.

Weston was signed for Leeds United by Don Revie for a fee of £18,000 in December 1962 after the departure of John Charles and scored a hat-trick on his home debut against Stoke City. He made a contribution to Leeds' successful promotion season of 1963–64 but faded from the first team as Alan Peacock and Jim Storrie were favoured for the centre-forward position. He joined Huddersfield Town in October 1965, later rejoined Wrexham, and played for Chester before joining non-league clubs Altrincham and Bethesda Athletic.

=== Playing statistics ===
| Club | League | FA Cup | League Cup | Total |
|---|---|---|---|---|
| | Apps (goals) | Apps (goals) | Apps (goals) | Apps (goals) |
| Wrexham | | | | 42 (21) |
| Birmingham City | | | | 23 (3) |
| Rotherham United | | | | 76 (21) |
| Leeds United | 68 (24) | 7 (1) | 3 (1) | 78 (26) |
| Huddersfield Town | | | | 21 (7) |
| Wrexham | | | | 42 (19) |
| Chester | | | | 3 (0) |

== Honours ==
Rotherham United

- Football League Cup runner-up: 1960–61

Leeds United

- Football League Second Division: 1963–64
