= Andy Hayward =

Andy or Andrew Hayward may refer to:

- Andrew Hayward (epidemiologist) (born 1966), British epidemiologist
- Andy Hayward (footballer) (born 1970), English footballer
- Andy Hayward (field hockey) (born 1985), New Zealand field hockey player

== See also ==
- Andy Heyward (born 1949), American media executive and animator
- Andrew Heyward, American media executive
