= Norman Ashe =

English footballer

Personal information
- Date of birth: 16 November 1943 (age 82)
- Place of birth: Walsall, England
- Position: Winger

Senior career*
Years	Team	Apps	(Gls)
1959–1961	Aston Villa	5	(0)
1962–1964	Rotherham United	6	(1)
1964–1969	Nuneaton Borough	161	(42)
1969–1973	Falmouth Town	132	(60)
1973–1975	Porthleven		
1975–1976	Illogan RBL		
1976–1978	Falmouth Town	58	(19)
1978–1982	Truro City		
1982–1985	Falmouth Town	17	(2)
Total		11	(1)
- * Club domestic league appearances and goals

Norman Ashe (born 16 November 1943) is an English former footballer who played in the Football League for Aston Villa and Rotherham United.
