= Willie McNaught =

Scottish footballer

Personal information
- Date of birth: 9 May 1922
- Place of birth: Dumfries, Scotland
- Date of death: 12 April 1989 (aged 66)
- Position: Defender

Senior career*
Years	Team	Apps	(Gls)
1946–1962	Raith Rovers	657	(1)
1962–1963	Brechin City	5	(0)

International career
1950–1954	Scotland	5	(0)
1950–1957	Scottish Football League XI	6	(0)
- * Club domestic league appearances and goals

William McNaught (9 May 1922 – 12 April 1989) was a Scottish footballer, who was born in Dumfries. McNaught holds the Raith Rovers club record for the number of appearances with the club of 657 between 1941 and 1962. McNaught was club captain and at international gained five full Scotland caps and six Scottish League caps. McNaught's son is European Cup winning footballer Ken McNaught.

== Club career ==
Were it not for the war, McNaught might have played for his hometown club, Queen of the South. The stylish full back and half back was discovered playing army football by a Raith Rovers official, who promptly signed him. He went on to form part of the half back line at Raith Rovers—alongside Andy Young and Andy Leigh—that remains highly regarded in the club’s history.

With the resumption of national league football in 1946–47 after the end of World War II, Raith were in Scotland's second tier. They improved season on season with finishes of sixth and fourth before being promoted as B Division champions in 1949. From then they stayed in Scotland's top flight until after McNaught's 1962 departure. The highlight of the 1950s golden era was undoubtedly the 5–1 destruction of Rangers at Stark's Park in December 1956. It was the peak of the greatest Raith Rovers team in 30 years and, for a while, they looked genuine championship contenders, eventually finishing in fourth place, their highest position since 1922, surpassing the fifth place of 1952 and one that has not been bettered since. Rovers were relegated the season after McNaught's departure to Brechin City.

In McNaught's time Raith had runs to the Scottish Cup semi finals in 1951, 1956 and 1957 as well as a quarter final defeat to Rangers in 1950 that required two replays. The crowd of 84,640 to watch the 1951 semi final 3–2 defeat to Celtic at Hampden Park in Celtic's native Glasgow is the largest ever to see a Raith Rovers game. Cup runs weren't exclusive to the Scottish Cup. Raith made it to the 1948–49 Scottish League Cup Final where they went down 2–0 to Rangers.

There was more to McNaught's game than just composure and elegance. Jim Baxter later commented of his "Iron Man" captain from his earliest days in professional football, "I would never have made it in today's circumstances. I needed bastards like Carmichael, Buckard, Ferrier, Herdman and McNaught. Young players like I was would simply tell them to get stuffed and take their talent elsewhere. I owe them."

Hearts legend Willie Bauld was known for his respectful tributes to opponents, and he particularly admired Willie McNaught as the player who provided him with his toughest challenges. The veteran McNaught was remembered by former Raith teammate Jim Menzies as a gentleman and an inspiration to younger players. Former Cowdenbeath player Tom Dawson, who played alongside McNaught in retirement with Fife all-stars, commented, ‘The player who amazed me in those games was ex-Raith and Scotland star Willie McNaught. Even at the age of 52, he would just stroll through the games.'

== International career ==
McNaught gained 5 full international caps for Scotland.

McNaught also represented the Scottish League six times and was a winner on all six occasions. This was 2 wins against each of the English League, the Irish League and the League of Ireland.
