= Bert Herdman =

Scottish football manager

Bert Herdman was manager of Raith Rovers F.C. from 1945 to 1961. He presided over one of the most sustained periods of success in the club's history. Raith spent 14 years in the top division while he was manager, despite regularly losing talented young players to English clubs.

Herdman was appointed as manager in 1945, and was also treasurer of the supporters' club at the time. He was responsible for signing many of Raith's great players, such as Willie Penman and Willie Polland.
