= Peter Perry (footballer) =

English footballer

Personal information
- Date of birth: 7 October 1937
- Place of birth: Treeton, Rotherham, England
- Date of death: 19 April 2011 (aged 73)
- Position: Defender

Senior career*
Years	Team	Apps	(Gls)
1957–1962	Rotherham United	99	(12)
1962–1963	York City	23	(0)
- Gainsborough Trinity
Total		122	(12)
- * Club domestic league appearances and goals

Peter Perry (11 April 1936 – 19 April 2011) was an English footballer who played in the Football League for Rotherham United and York City. He was a member of Rotherham United's 1961 Football League Cup final squad.

== Honours ==
Rotherham United

- Football League Cup runner-up: 1960–61
