= Roy Ironside =

English footballer (1935–2025)

Personal information
- Date of birth: 28 May 1935
- Place of birth: Sheffield, England
- Date of death: 8 June 2024 (aged 89)
- Position: Goalkeeper

Senior career*
Years	Team	Apps	(Gls)
1956–1965	Rotherham United	220	(0)
1965–1969	Barnsley	113	(0)
Total		333	(0)
- * Club domestic league appearances and goals

Roy Ironside (28 May 1935 – 8 June 2024) was an English professional footballer who played in The Football League for Rotherham United and Barnsley.

Ironside was a member of Rotherham's 1961 Football League Cup final team. His son is Ian Ironside, a retired professional footballer who was also a goalkeeper. Furthermore, his grandson is Joe Ironside who is currently a striker for Doncaster Rovers.

Ironside died on 8 June 2024, at the age of 89.

== Honours ==
Rotherham United

- Football League Cup runner-up: 1960–61
