= Ken Waterhouse =

English footballer

Personal information
- Full name: Kenneth Waterhouse
- Date of birth: 23 January 1930
- Place of birth: Ormskirk, England
- Date of death: 4 April 2016 (aged 86)
- Place of death: Lancaster, England
- Position: Wing half

Senior career*
Years	Team	Apps	(Gls)
- Burscough
1953–1957	Preston North End	20	(5)
1958–1962	Rotherham United	123	(12)
1962–1964	Bristol City	16	(1)
1965	Darlington	1	(0)
Total		160	(18)

Managerial career
- 1965–1969: Morecambe
- 1970–1972: Morecambe
- * Club domestic league appearances and goals

Kenneth Waterhouse (23 January 1930 – 4 April 2016) was a professional footballer who played in the Football League for Preston North End, Rotherham United, Bristol City and Darlington. He was a member of Rotherham's 1961 Football League Cup final team. Waterhouse became manager of Morecambe in 1965 and left in 1969. However just several months later he was back at The Shrimps where he spent another two years.

== Honours ==
Rotherham United

- Football League Cup runner-up: 1960–61
