= Willie Penman (footballer, born 1922) =

Scottish footballer (1922–2005)

Personal information
- Full name: William Henders Penman
- Date of birth: 1 April 1922
- Place of birth: Kelty, Scotland
- Date of death: 31 January 2005 (aged 82)
- Place of death: Kirkcaldy, Scotland
- Position: Centre forward

Senior career*
| Years | Team | Apps | (Gls) |
| 1942–1954 | Raith Rovers | 138 | (91) |
| 1955–1956 | Montrose | 11 | (8) |
| 1956 | Dundee United | 5 | (1) |
| Total | | 154 | (100) |
- * Club domestic league appearances and goals

William Henders Penman (1 April 1922 – 31 January 2005) was a Scottish footballer. He played the majority of his career for Raith Rovers, and is their all-time leading goal scorer with 211 goals in 328 appearances. Later in his career he had short spells with Montrose and Dundee United.

Penman was signed in 1940 and made his debut in 1942, scoring seven goals in his first nine games. He led Raith's goal scoring every season between 1947 and 1951. His best season was 1948–49, when he scored 58 goals in 47 matches and helped Raith win the Second Division championship and reach the Scottish League Cup Final. During the final, which Raith lost 2–0 to Rangers F.C., Penman scored a goal shortly before half time which was controversially deemed offside.

Willie Penman died of cancer on 31 January 2005, at the age of 82.
