= Andy Young (footballer) =

Scottish footballer

Personal information
- Date of birth: 21 June 1925
- Place of birth: Oakley, Fife, Scotland
- Date of death: 27 October 2008 (aged 83)
- Position: Wing half

Youth career
- Steelend Victoria

Senior career*
Years	Team	Apps	(Gls)
1943–1946	Celtic	0	(0)
1946–1960	Raith Rovers	369	(85)
- * Club domestic league appearances and goals

Andy Young (21 June 1925 – 27 October 2008) was a Scottish footballer who played as a wing half for Celtic and Raith Rovers.
