= Roy Lambert (footballer) =

English footballer (1933–2022)

Personal information
- Date of birth: 16 July 1933
- Place of birth: Hoyland, England
- Date of death: 5 February 2022 (aged 88)
- Place of death: Barnsley, England
- Position: Wing half

Senior career*
Years	Team	Apps	(Gls)
1956–1965	Rotherham United	307	(0)
1965–1966	Barnsley	3	(0)
Total		310	(6)
- * Club domestic league appearances and goals

Roy Lambert (16 July 1933 – 5 February 2022) was an English professional footballer who played in The Football League for Rotherham United and Barnsley. He was a member of Rotherham's 1961 Football League Cup Final team.

Following his rather brief spell as a player at Barnsley, Lambert joined Huddersfield Town as their Youth Coach. He was also Chief Scout at one point.

Lambert died in Barnsley on 5 February 2022, at the age of 88.

== Honours ==
Rotherham United

- Football League Cup runner-up: 1960–61
