= Peter Madden (footballer) =

English footballer (1934–2020)

Personal information
- Date of birth: 31 October 1934
- Place of birth: Bradford, England
- Date of death: 13 April 2020 (aged 85)
- Position: Defender

Senior career*
Years	Team	Apps	(Gls)
1955–1966	Rotherham United	311	(7)
1966–1967	Bradford Park Avenue	28	(1)
1967–1968	Aldershot	27	(1)
1968–1970	Skegness Town		
Total		366	(9)

Managerial career
- 1975–1978: Darlington
- 1980–1983: Rochdale
- * Club domestic league appearances and goals

Peter Madden (31 October 1934 – 13 April 2020) was an English professional footballer who played for Rotherham United from 1955 to 1966. He was also manager of the English football clubs Darlington (1975–1978) and Rochdale (1980–1983). After leaving Rochdale in March 1983 he stayed in the area and ran a public house in nearby Littleborough. He was married to Christine and a father to five. He died in April 2020 at the age of 85.

== Managerial stats ==
Team	Nat	From	To	Record				
Team	Nat	From	To	G	W	L	D	Win %
Darlington	(England)	August 1975	October 1978	153	62	49	42	32.0
Rochdale	(England)	June 1980	March 1983	124	52	31	41	25.0

== Honours ==
Rotherham United

- Football League Cup runner-up: 1960–61
