= Barry Webster =

English footballer (1935–2023)

Personal information
- Full name: John Barry Webster
- Date of birth: 3 March 1935
- Place of birth: Sheffield, England
- Date of death: April 2023 (aged 88)
- Position: Forward

Senior career*
Years	Team	Apps	(Gls)
1956–1962	Rotherham United	179	(37)
1962–1964	Bradford City	53	(9)
1964–?	Buxton		
Total		232	(46)
- * Club domestic league appearances and goals

John Barry Webster (3 March 1935 – April 2023) was an English professional footballer who played in the Football League for Rotherham United and Bradford City. He scored the opening goal of Rotherham's 2–0 win in the first leg of the 1961 Football League Cup Final, but opponents Aston Villa came back in the second leg to win the inaugural edition of the competition 3–2 on aggregate after extra time. After leaving Bradford, he joined Buxton.

== Honours ==
Rotherham United

- Football League Cup runner-up: 1960–61
