= Alan O'Neill (footballer, born 1937) =

English footballer (born 1937)

Personal information
- Date of birth: 13 November 1937 (age 88)
- Place of birth: Leadgate, England
- Position: Inside forward

Senior career*
Years	Team	Apps	(Gls)
1956–1960	Sunderland	74	(27)
1960–1962	Aston Villa	23	(6)
1962–1964	Plymouth Argyle	40	(14)
1964–1966	Bournemouth	37	(8)
- Cambridge United
- Southern Suburbs
- Chelmsford City
- Drumcondra
1971	Toronto Ukraina		
1971	Toronto Hellas		
1971	New York Cosmos	3	(1)
- Vancouver Whitecaps
Total		177+	(56+)
- * Club domestic league appearances and goals

Alan O'Neill (born 13 November 1937) is an English former professional footballer who played in the Football League for Sunderland, Aston Villa, Plymouth Argyle and Bournemouth.

== Career ==
O'Neill played in the National Soccer League with Toronto Ukraina in 1971. Before his departure to the North American Soccer League he briefly played with NSL rivals Toronto Hellas.

In August 1971, O'Neill signed for New York Cosmos. Although listed as a goalkeeper by numerous sources, it appears his statistics have been confused with teammate Emmanuel Kofie, and rather than playing 11 games with no goals, he actually played three games, scoring once.

== Honours ==
Aston Villa

- Football League Cup: 1960–61
