= Lol Morgan =

English footballer and manager (1931–2022)

Personal information
- Full name: Laurence Morgan
- Date of birth: 5 May 1931
- Place of birth: Rotherham, England
- Date of death: January 2022 (aged 90)
- Position: Defender

Senior career*
Years	Team	Apps	(Gls)
1949–1951	Huddersfield Town	7	(0)
1954–1964	Rotherham United	291	(0)
1964–1966	Darlington	30	(0)
Total		328	(0)

Managerial career
- 1964–1966: Darlington (player-manager)
- 1966–1969: Norwich City
- * Club domestic league appearances and goals

Laurence Morgan (5 May 1931 – January 2022) was an English professional footballer, and manager who was active during the 1940s, 1950s and 1960s. He was born in Rotherham on 5 May 1931, and died in January 2022 at the age of 90.

== Managerial statistics ==
Team	From	To	Record				
Team	From	To	G	W	L	D	Win %
Darlington (player)	July 1964	June 1966	94	43	36	15	47.8
Norwich City	June 1966	May 1969	127	45	47	35	35.4

== Honours ==
=== As a player ===
Rotherham United

- Football League Cup runner-up: 1960–61

=== As player-manager ===
Darlington

- Football League Fourth Division runner-up: 1965–66
