= Alan Kirkman =

English footballer

Personal information
- Full name: Alan John Kirkman
- Date of birth: 21 June 1936
- Place of birth: Bolton, England
- Date of death: 14 January 2011 (aged 74)
- Place of death: Bolton, England
- Position: Inside forward

Youth career
- Bacup Borough

Senior career*
Years	Team	Apps	(Gls)
1956–1958	Manchester City	7	(6)
1958–1964	Rotherham United	144	(58)
1964	Newcastle United	5	(1)
1964–1965	Scunthorpe United	32	(5)
1965–1967	Torquay United	59	(8)
1967–1968	Workington	56	(3)
Total		303	(81)

Managerial career
- Netherfield (player/manager)
- * Club domestic league appearances and goals

Alan John Kirkman (21 June 1936 – 14 January 2011) was an English footballer, who played as an inside forward in the Football League for Manchester City, Rotherham United, Newcastle United, Scunthorpe United, Torquay United and Workington.

== Honours ==
Rotherham United

- Football League Cup runner-up: 1960–61
