= Chris Buckley (footballer) =

English footballer

Personal information
- Full name: Christopher Sebastian Buckley
- Date of birth: 9 November 1886
- Place of birth: Urmston, Lancashire, England
- Date of death: 11 January 1973 (aged 86)
- Place of death: Birmingham, England
- Height: 5 ft 9 in (1.75 m)
- Position: Centre half

Youth career
- Victoria Park
- Manchester Ship Canal
- Manchester City Reserves

Senior career*
Years	Team	Apps	(Gls)
1905–1906	Brighton & Hove Albion	19	(1)
1906–1914	Aston Villa	136	(3)
1914–1921	Arsenal	56	(3)
- * Club domestic league appearances and goals

Christopher Sebastian Buckley (9 November 1886 – 11 January 1973) was a footballer in the early years of professional football in England, who played at centre half for a variety of clubs including Aston Villa and Arsenal, before later returning to Villa as director and chairman. He was the younger brother of Frank Buckley, who was also a player and manager of Wolverhampton Wanderers.

== Biography ==
Born in Urmston, Lancashire, Buckley studied at Xaverian College in his native city and the Manchester Catholic Collegiate Institute. He went on to play for Victoria Park, Manchester Ship Canal and Manchester City Reserves before stepping up to the senior level with Brighton & Hove Albion of the Southern League in 1905.

A year later he joined Aston Villa and played 20 league games in his first season, before breaking his ankle in a game against Manchester United on the opening day of the 1907-08 season, which kept him out of the game for over a year.

He continued to play for Villa after coming back from injury, winning a First Division title in 1909-10 and made nearly 150 league appearances for Aston Villa in six seasons. He had a trial for England in 1911 but was never capped. In 1914 he moved south to join Arsenal of the Second Division, and played in the last season before competitive football's suspension due to World War I. Aged 31 when football resumed in 1919, he still played for another two seasons before breaking a leg in 1920-21 and losing his place to Alex Graham. In total he played 59 games for the club, scoring three goals.

After retiring, Buckley later returned to Villa, joining the club's board of directors in 1936, and serving as chairman from 1955 to 1966. He stepped down as a director in 1967 and died in 1973, aged 86.
