= Peter McParland =

Northern Irish footballer (1934–2025)

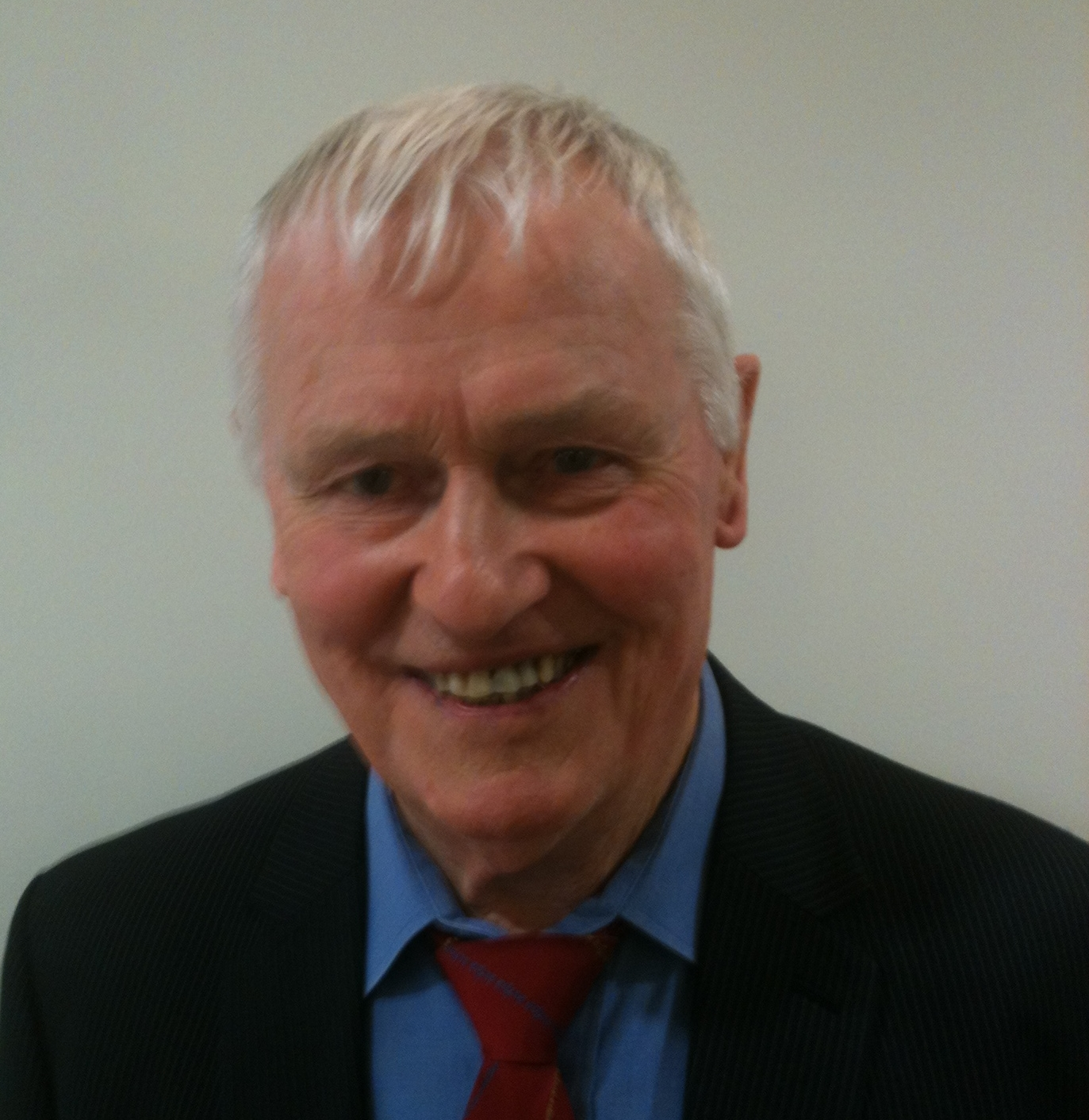
- McParland in 2013

Personal information
- Full name: Peter James McParland
- Date of birth: 25 April 1934
- Place of birth: Newry, Northern Ireland
- Date of death: 4 May 2025 (aged 91)
- Position: Outside left

Senior career*
Years	Team	Apps	(Gls)
1951–1952	Dundalk	14	(2)
1952–1962	Aston Villa	293	(98)
1962–1963	Wolverhampton Wanderers	21	(10)
1963–1964	Plymouth Argyle	38	(15)
1964–1965	Worcester City		(11)
1965	Toronto Inter-Roma		
1965	Peterborough United	0	(0)
1965–1967	Worcester City		(7)
1967–1968	Atlanta Chiefs	54	(14)
1968–1971	Glentoran	7	(3)
Total		427	(160)

International career
1954–1962	Northern Ireland	34	(10)

Managerial career
- 1968–1971: Glentoran
- 1980: Hong Kong
- * Club domestic league appearances and goals

Peter James McParland (25 April 1934 – 4 May 2025) was a Northern Irish footballer who played as an outside left. He was the last surviving member of the Aston Villa team which won the 1957 FA Cup, in which game he scored twice. McParland was the first player to score in and win both English major domestic cup finals.

McParland won 34 caps for Northern Ireland, scoring 10 international goals including the winner that sent the team into the World Cup quarter-finals in 1958. With five goals in 1958, he is Northern Ireland's leading scorer at a World Cup tournament. His international captain and English Hall of Fame member Danny Blanchflower considered McParland "the finest ever inside forward in British football".

== Club career ==
=== Dundalk ===
McParland was born in Newry, County Down, Northern Ireland. He was spotted playing for Dundalk in the League of Ireland by Aston Villa manager George Martin.

=== Aston Villa ===
A fine header and striker of the ball, McParland holds a unique place in English football history as the first player to score in and win both English major domestic knockout finals. During his time with Aston Villa, McParland was influenced by Jimmy Hogan. He later won the FA Cup in 1957, scoring twice in the final against favourites Manchester United but also becoming involved in an incident in which he shoulder-charged (at the time a legitimate form of challenge) the Manchester United goalkeeper, Ray Wood, after only six minutes which left Wood unconscious and with a broken cheekbone. McParland consoled Wood after the incident and they remained close until Wood's death. Following the Munich air disaster, McParland was a pall bearer at the funeral of Duncan Edwards.

McParland also won the Second Division title in 1960 and the League Cup in 1961 with Aston Villa. He was on the scoresheet for the second leg of the 1961 League Cup Final, when the home team overturned a 2–0 deficit against Rotherham United to win the second leg 3–0 at Villa Park and became the winners of the first Football League Cup.

McParland became the last surviving player from the 1957 FA Cup Final after the death of Bobby Charlton in October 2023.

=== Wolverhampton Wanderers and Plymouth Argyle ===
Following Aston Villa, McParland joined local rivals Wolverhampton Wanderers for a brief spell in 1962. Although he was only there for one season, he did manage to score 10 goals in 21 games. The following season McParland moved on to Plymouth Argyle, his final English league club (although he later turned out for Worcester City in the Southern League), before hanging up his boots. In 1965, McParland was recruited to play for Toronto Inter-Roma FC of the Eastern Canadian Professional Soccer League. He scored many memorable goals, especially one against the Hamilton Steelers to give his side the victory.

McParland played for the Atlanta Chiefs of the North American Soccer League in 1967 and 1968. He ended his career as player-manager of Glentoran.

== International career ==
McParland scored twice in his debut against Wales in 1953–54 season and played very well for Northern Ireland in the 1958 FIFA World Cup in which he scored five goals and helped his team to the quarter-final against France.

In April 2015, the feature-length documentary Spirit of '58 was screened as part of the Belfast Film Festival. It featured Peter McParland prominently alongside the other surviving players at the time (Billy Bingham, Billy Simpson, Jimmy McIlroy and Harry Gregg) as it told the story of Northern Ireland's journey throughout the 1950s under the managership of Peter Doherty, culminating in the 1958 World Cup. Following the death of Billy Bingham in June 2022, McParland was the last surviving member of the Northern Ireland team that played during the 1958 FIFA World Cup.

Team supporter Billy Hunter spoke of McParland's kindness to him during the 1958 World Cup Finals.

== Death ==
McParland died on 4 May 2025, at the age of 91.

== Career statistics ==
Scores and results list Northern Ireland's goal tally first, score column indicates score after each McParland goal.

List of international goals scored by Peter McParland
No.	Date	Venue	Opponent	Result	Competition
1	31 March 1954	Wrexham, Wales	Wales	2–0	1954 British Home Championship
2	31 March 1954	Wrexham, Wales	Wales	2–0	1954 British Home Championship
3	11 June 1958	Halmstad, Sweden	Argentina	1–3	1958 FIFA World Cup
4	15 June 1958	Malmö, Sweden	West Germany	2–2	1958 FIFA World Cup
5	15 June 1958	Malmö, Sweden	West Germany	2–2	1958 FIFA World Cup
6	17 June 1958	Malmö, Sweden	Czechoslovakia	2–1	1958 FIFA World Cup
7	17 June 1958	Malmö, Sweden	Czechoslovakia	2–1	1958 FIFA World Cup
8	22 April 1959	Wrexham, Wales	Wales	4–1	1959 British Home Championship
9	22 April 1959	Wrexham, Wales	Wales	4–1	1959 British Home Championship
10	9 November 1960	Glasgow, Scotland	Scotland	2–5	1961 British Home Championship

== Honours ==
Aston Villa

- FA Cup: 1956–57
- Football League Cup: 1960–61

== See also ==
- List of FIFA World Cup top goalscorers
