= 1960–61 Football League Cup =

1960–61 League Cup
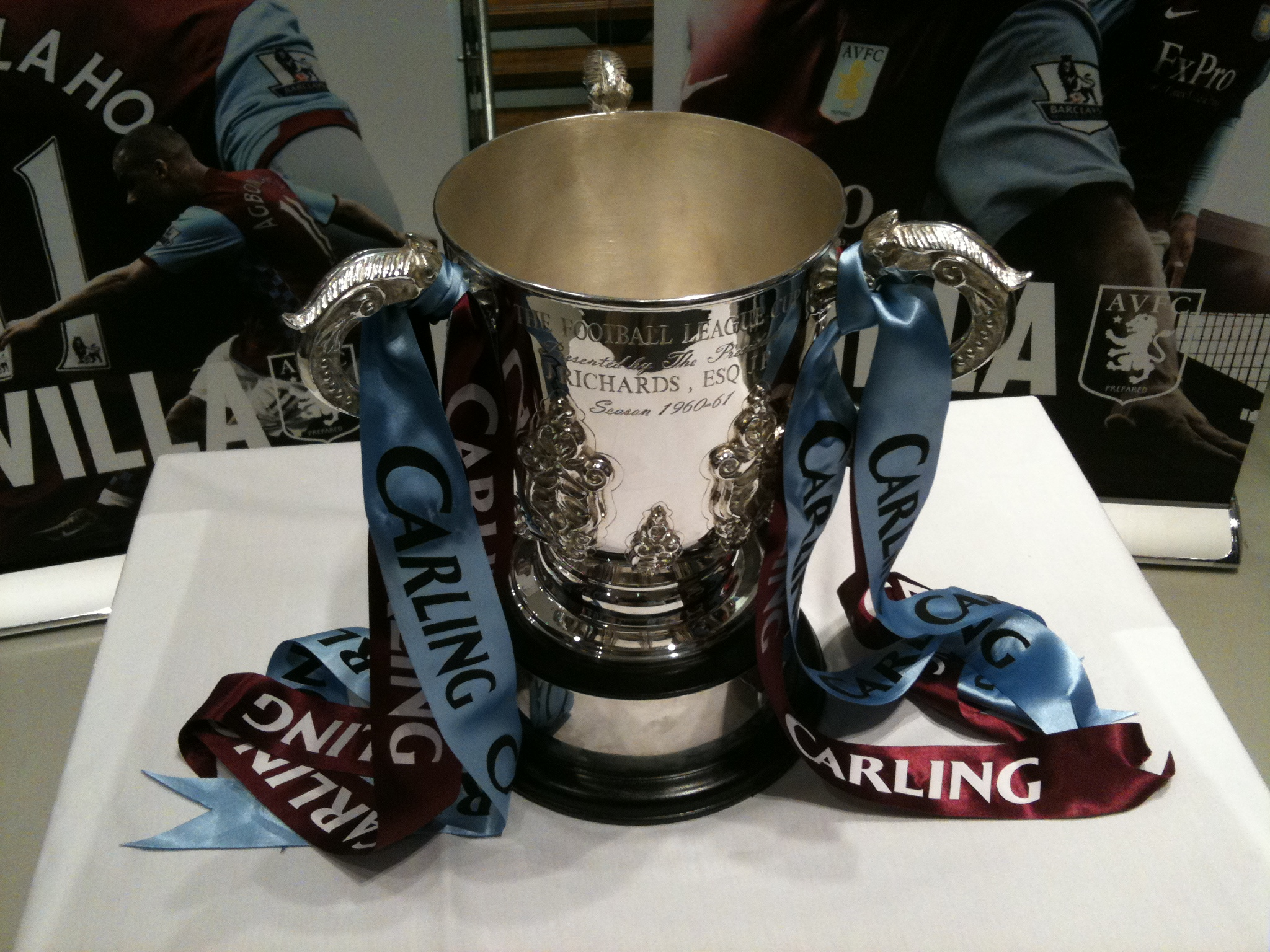
- A replica League Cup in Villa colours with 1960–61 date

Tournament details
- Country: England; Wales
- Teams: 87

Final positions
- Champions: Aston Villa
- Runners-up: Rotherham United

Tournament statistics
- Matches played: 113
- Top goal scorer: Gerry Hitchens (11 goals)

The 1960–61 Football League Cup was the inaugural staging of the Football League Cup, a knockout competition for England's top 92 football clubs. The competition began on 26 September 1960, and ended with the two-legged final almost a year later on 22 August and 5 September 1961.

The tournament was won by Aston Villa, who beat Rotherham United 3–2 on aggregate (a.e.t.). Rotherham won the first leg 2–0 at Millmoor, their home ground thanks to goals from Alan Kirkman and Barry Webster. In the second leg at Villa Park, Harry Burrows and Peter McParland levelled the tie on aggregate and Alan O'Neill scored in extra-time to win the cup for Aston Villa.

== Calendar ==
5 League teams did not compete (Arsenal, Tottenham Hotspur, Sheffield Wednesday, West Bromwich Albion and Wolverhampton Wanderers). Of the other 87 teams, 41 received a bye to the second round and the other 46 played in the first round. Unlike in later seasons, the byes were assigned randomly; from 1962–63 onward the lower teams played in the first round while the upper division teams joined them in the second round onward.

Round	Main date	Fixtures		Clubs	New entries this round
Round	Main date	Original	Replays	Clubs	New entries this round
First Round	10 October 1960	23	8	87 → 64	46
Second Round	24 October 1960	32	9	64 → 32	41
Third Round	16 November 1960	16	3	32 → 16	none
Fourth round	14 December 1960	8	3	16 → 8	none
Fifth round	February 1960	4	0	8 → 4	none
Semi-finals	10 April 1961	2	1	4 → 2	none
Final	22 August & 5 September 1961	1	0	2 → 1	none

== First round ==
A total of 46 clubs played in the first round: 17 from Fourth Division (tier 4), 8 from Third Division (tier 3), and 10 from the Second Division (tier 2) and 11 from the First Division (tier 1).

Number of teams per tier still in competition
First Division (Note: 5 teams did not compete: Arsenal, Sheffield Wednesday, Tottenham Hotspur, West Bromwich Albion and Wolverhampton Wanderers.)	Second Division	Third Division	Fourth Division	Total (Note: 5 First Division's teams did not compete)
17 / 22	22 / 22	24 / 24	24 / 24	87 / 92

=== Ties ===
Home team	Score	Away team	Attendance	Date
Bristol Rovers (2)	2–1	Fulham (1)	20,022	26-09-1960
Chester (4)	2–2	Leyton Orient (2)	9.074	12-10-1960
Colchester United (3)	4–1	Newcastle United (1)	9,130	10-10-1960
Coventry City (3)	4–2	Barrow (4)	6,643	10-10-1960
Darlington (4)	2–0	Crystal Palace (4)	9,940	12-10-1960
Everton (1)	3–1	Accrington Stanley (4)	18,246	12-10-1960
Exeter City (4)	1–1	Manchester United (1)		19-10-1960
Hull City (3)	0–0	Bolton Wanderers (1)	11,980	10-10-1960
Ipswich Town (2)	0–2	Barnsley (3)		11-10-1960
Leicester City (1)	4–0	Mansfield Town (4)	7,070	12-10-1960
Lincoln City (2)	2–2	Bradford Park Avenue (4)	1,737	12-10-1960
Middlesbrough (2)	3–4	Cardiff City (1)		03-10-1960
Millwall (4)	1–7	Chelsea (1)	15,007	10-10-1960
Newport County (3)	2–2	Southampton (2)	7,834	10-10-1960
Oldham Athletic (4)	2–1	Hartlepool United (4)		11-10-1960
Plymouth Argyle (2)	2–0	Southport (4)	10,048	12-10-1960
Preston North End (1)	4–1	Peterborough United (4)		11-10-1960
Queens Park Rangers (3)	2–2	Port Vale (3)		17-10-1960
Rochdale (4)	1–1	Scunthorpe United (2)	4,274	10-10-1960
Stockport County (4)	2–0	Carlisle United (4)	7,000	10-10-1960
Watford (3)	2–5	Derby County (2)		11-10-1960
West Ham United (1)	3–1	Charlton Athletic (2)		26-09-1960
York City (4)	1–3	Blackburn Rovers (1)	10,933	10-10-1960

=== Replays ===
Home team	Score	Away team	Attendance	Date
Bolton Wanderers (1)	5–1	Hull City (3)		19-10-1960
Bradford Park Avenue (4)	1–0	Lincoln City (2)	3,415	19-10-1960
Leyton Orient (2)	1–0	Chester (4)		17-10-1960
Manchester United (1)	4–1	Exeter City (4)		26-10-1960
Port Vale (3)	3–1	Queens Park Rangers (3)		19-10-1960
Scunthorpe United (2)	0–1	Rochdale (4)	5,727	20-10-1960
Southampton (2)	2–2	Newport County (3)	8,000	17-10-1960

=== Second Replay ===
Home team	Score	Away team	Attendance	Date
Southampton (2)	5–3	Newport County (3)	8,414	26-10-1960

== Second round ==
=== Ties ===
Home team	Score	Away team	Attendance	Date
Aldershot (4)	1–1	Bristol City (3)	5,700	10-10-1960
Aston Villa (1)	4–1	Huddersfield Town (2)	17,057	12-10-1960
Bolton Wanderers (1)	6–2	Grimsby Town (3)		26-10-1960
Bournemouth & Boscombe Athletic (3)	1–1	Crewe Alexandra (4)	3,208	12-10-1960
Bradford City (3)	2–1	Manchester United (1)		02-11-1960
Bradford Park Avenue (4)	0–1	Birmingham City (1)		31-10-1960
Brentford (3)	4–3	Sunderland (2)		25-10-1960
Bury (3)	2–1	Sheffield United (2)		11-10-1960
Cardiff City (1)	0–4	Burnley (1)		24-10-1960
Chelsea (1)	4–2	Workington (4)		24-10-1960
Colchester United (3)	0–2	Southampton (2)		31-10-1960
Darlington (4)	3–2	West Ham United (1)		24-10-1960
Derby County (2)	3–0	Barnsley (3)		19-10-1960
Doncaster Rovers (4)	3–1	Stoke City (2)		18-10-1960
Everton (1)	3–1	Walsall (3)		31-10-1960
Gillingham (4)	1–1	Preston North End (1)		19-10-1960
Leeds United (2)	0–0	Blackpool (1)	13,064	28-09-1960
Leicester City (1)	1–2	Rotherham United (2)		26-10-1960
Leyton Orient (2)	0–1	Chesterfield (3)		14-11-1960
Liverpool (2)	1–1	Luton Town (2)	10,502	19-10-1960
Manchester City (1)	3–0	Stockport County (4)		18-10-1960
Northampton Town (4)	1–1	Wrexham (4)		18-10-1960
Norwich City (2)	6–2	Oldham Athletic (4)		26-10-1960
Nottingham Forest (1)	2–0	Halifax Town (3)		06-10-1960
Notts County (3)	1–3	Brighton & Hove Albion (2)		20-10-1960
Plymouth Argyle (2)	1–1	Torquay United (3)		02-11-1960
Portsmouth (2)	2–0	Coventry City (3)		02-11-1960
Port Vale (3)	0–2	Tranmere Rovers (3)		24-10-1960
Reading (3)	3–5	Bristol Rovers (2)	8,323	12-10-1960
Rochdale (4)	5–2	Southend United (3)		25-10-1960
Swansea Town (2)	1–2	Blackburn Rovers (1)		18-10-1960
Swindon Town (4)	1–1	Shrewsbury Town (4)	10,840	12-10-1960

=== Replays ===
Home team	Score	Away team	Attendance	Date
Blackpool (1)	1–3	Leeds United (2)		05-10-1960
Bristol City (3)	3–0	Aldershot (4)		25-10-1960
Crewe Alexandra (4)	2–0	Bournemouth & Boscombe Athletic (3)		19-10-1960
Luton Town (2)	2–5	Liverpool (2)	6,125	24-10-1960
Plymouth Argyle (2)	2–1	Torquay United (3)		07-11-1960
Preston North End (1)	3–0	Gillingham (4)		25-10-1960
Shrewsbury Town (4)	2–2	Swindon Town (4)	5,343	24-10-1960
Wrexham (4)	2–0	Northampton Town (4)		25-10-1960

=== Second Replay ===
Home team	Score	Away team	Attendance	Date
Swindon Town (4)	0–2	Shrewsbury Town (4)	6,975	26-10-1960

== Third round ==
=== Ties ===
Home team	Score	Away team	Attendance	Date
Birmingham City (1)	0–0	Plymouth Argyle (2)		14-11-1960
Blackburn Rovers (1)	2–1	Rochdale (4)		21-11-1960
Brentford (3)	1–1	Burnley (1)		22-11-1960
Brighton & Hove Albion (2)	0–2	Wrexham (4)		16-11-1960
Chesterfield (3)	0–4	Leeds United (2)		23-11-1960
Darlington (4)	1–2	Bolton Wanderers (1)		14-11-1960
Derby County (2)	1–4	Norwich City (2)		14-11-1960
Doncaster Rovers (4)	0–7	Chelsea (1)		16-11-1960
Everton (1)	3–1	Bury (3)		23-11-1960
Liverpool (2)	1–2	Southampton (2)	14,036	16-11-1960
Nottingham Forest (1)	2–1	Bristol City (3)		15-11-1960
Portsmouth (2)	2–0	Manchester City (1)		21-11-1960
Preston North End (1)	3–3	Aston Villa (1)	7,677	15-11-1960
Rotherham United (2)	2–0	Bristol Rovers (2)		23-11-1960
Shrewsbury Town (3)	2–1	Bradford City (3)	8,363	16-11-1960
Tranmere Rovers (3)	2–0	Crewe Alexandra (4)		16-11-1960

=== Replays ===
Home team	Score	Away team	Attendance	Date
Aston Villa (1)	3–1	Preston North End (1)	15,000	23-11-1960
Burnley (1)	2–1	Brentford (3)		06-12-1960
Plymouth Argyle (2)	3–1	Birmingham City (1)		16-11-1960

== Fourth round ==
=== Ties ===
Home team	Score	Away team	Attendance	Date
Aston Villa (1)	3–3	Plymouth Argyle (2)	12,117	13-12-1960
Blackburn Rovers (1)	1–1	Wrexham (4)		05-12-1960
Bolton Wanderers (1)	0–2	Rotherham United (2)		20-12-1960
Burnley (1)	2–1	Nottingham Forest (1)		10-01-1961
Portsmouth (2)	1–0	Chelsea (1)		14-12-1960
Shrewsbury Town (3)	1–0	Norwich City (2)	7,427	14-12-1960
Southampton (2)	5–4	Leeds United (2)		05-12-1960
Tranmere Rovers (3)	0–4	Everton (1)		21-12-1960

=== Replays ===
Home team	Score	Away team	Attendance	Date
Plymouth Argyle (2)	0–0	Aston Villa (1)	11,006	19-12-1960
Wrexham (4)	3–1	Blackburn Rovers (1)		14-12-1960

=== Second Replay ===
Home team	Score	Away team	Attendance	Date
Plymouth Argyle (2)	3–5	Aston Villa (1)	13,548	06-02-1961

== Fifth round ==
=== Ties ===
Home team	Score	Away team	Attendance	Date
Aston Villa (1)	3–0	Wrexham (4)	19,500	22-02-1961
Rotherham United (2)	3–0	Portsmouth (2)		13-02-1961
Shrewsbury Town (3)	2–1	Everton (1)	15,399	15-02-1961
Southampton (2)	2–4	Burnley (1)		06-02-1961

== Semi-finals ==
The semi-final draw was made in February 1961 after the conclusion of the quarter-finals. Unlike the rounds up to that point, the semi-final ties were played over two legs, with each team playing one leg at home. The matches were played in March, April and May 1961.

=== First leg ===
Home team	Score	Away team	Attendance	Date
Burnley (1)	1–1	Aston Villa (1)	15,908	10-04-1961
Rotherham United (2)	3–2	Shrewsbury Town (3)	13,337	21-03-1961

=== Second leg ===
Home team	Score	Away team	Attendance	Date
Aston Villa (1)	2–2	Burnley (1)	23,077	26-04-1961
Shrewsbury Town (3)	1–1	Rotherham United (2)	16,722	10-04-1961

=== Replay ===
Home team	Score	Away team	Attendance	Date
Aston Villa (1)	2–1	Burnley (1)	7,953	02-05-1961

== Final ==
The 1961 League Cup Final was played on 22 August and 5 September 1961 and was contested between First Division side Aston Villa and Second Division team Rotherham United. Aston Villa won the game 3–2 on aggregate (after extra time).

=== First leg ===
22 August 1961

Rotherham United (2)	2–0	Aston Villa (1)
Kirkman 51'; Webster 55'

Millmoor, Rotherham
Attendance: 12,226
Referee: K. A. Collinge.

=== Second leg ===
5 September 1961

Aston Villa (1)	3–0 (a.e.t.)	Rotherham United (2)
O'Neill 67'; Burrows 69'; McParland 109'

Villa Park, Birmingham
Attendance: 30,765
Referee: C. W. Kingston.

Aston Villa wins 3–2 on aggregate.
