= 1963–64 Birmingham City F.C. season =

Birmingham City F.C.
1963–64 season
- Chairman: Harry Morris, Jr
- Manager: Gil Merrick
- Ground: St Andrew's
- Football League First Division: 20th
- FA Cup: Third round (eliminated by Port Vale)
- Football League Cup: Second round (eliminated by Norwich City)
- Top goalscorer: League: Bertie Auld (10); All: Bertie Auld (10)
- Highest home attendance: 36,847 vs Manchester United, 7 September 1963
- Lowest home attendance: 13,915 vs Fulham, 21 December 1963
- Average home league attendance: 21,996
Home colours

The 1963–64 Football League season was Birmingham City Football Club's 61st in the Football League and their 37th in the First Division. They finished in 20th position in the 22-team division, only one point above the relegation places. They lost their opening match in each of the cup competitions, to Port Vale in the third round proper of the 1963–64 FA Cup and to Norwich City in the second round of the League Cup.

Although Birmingham maintained their First Division status, the board of directors asked Gil Merrick to resign as manager. He had been with the club for 25 years as player – he was first-choice goalkeeper for 14 years and, as of 2012, he held the club's appearance record – and manager, having led Birmingham to the 1961 Fairs Cup Final in his first season and to victory in the 1963 League Cup Final to win the club's first and, until 2011, only major trophy. In June, Nottingham Forest's trainer-coach Joe Mallett was brought in with responsibility for "team affairs, including team selection". He was formally appointed manager early in the 1964–65 season.

Twenty-five players made at least one appearance in nationally organised first-team competition, and there were fifteen different goalscorers. Forward Mike Hellawell played in 42 of the 44 first-team matches over the season, and Bertie Auld finished as leading goalscorer with 10 goals, all scored in league competition.

== Football League First Division ==
Date	League position	Opponents	Venue	Result	Score F–A	Scorers	Attendance
24 August 1963	5th	Bolton Wanderers	H	W	2–1	Lynn pen, Hellawell	24,817
28 August 1963	16th	Leicester City	A	L	0–1		27,694
31 August 1963	18th	Fulham	A	L	1–2	Lynn pen	21,260
4 September 1963	11th	Leicester City	H	W	2–0	Leek, Hellawell	23,851
7 September 1963	15th	Manchester United	H	D	1–1	Harley	36,874
11 September 1963	17th	West Bromwich Albion	H	L	0–1		34,666
14 September 1963	17th	Burnley	A	L	1–2	Harris	20,350
18 September 1963	18th	West Bromwich Albion	A	L	1–3	Harris	29,662
21 September 1963	16th	Ipswich Town	H	W	1–0	Beard	19,095
28 September 1963	18th	Sheffield Wednesday	A	L	1–2	Thomson	18,233
2 October 1963	19th	Tottenham Hotspur	A	L	1–6	Auld	37,649
5 October 1963	20th	Everton	H	L	0–2		23,593
19 October 1963	20th	Sheffield United	A	L	0–3		18,974
26 October 1963	20th	Wolverhampton Wanderers	H	D	2–2	Harley, Woodfield og	24,843
2 November 1963	20th	Chelsea	A	W	3–2	Harley, P. Bullock, Auld	22,974
5 November 1963	20th	Arsenal	A	L	1–4	Bloomfield	23,499
9 November 1963	20th	Blackpool	H	W	3–2	Bloomfield, Auld, Lynn	17,536
16 November 1963	20th	Blackburn Rovers	A	L	0–3		14,813
23 November 1963	20th	Nottingham Forest	H	D	3–3	Auld 2, Smith	18,161
30 November 1963	20th	Stoke City	A	L	1–4	Auld	27,260
7 December 1963	20th	West Ham United	H	W	2–1	Auld, Lynn pen	15,483
14 December 1963	20th	Bolton Wanderers	A	W	2–0	Leek, Hellawell	9,663
21 December 1963	19th	Fulham	H	D	0–0		13,915
28 December 1963	19th	Arsenal	H	L	1–4	Harley	23,377
11 January 1964	18th	Manchester United	A	W	2–1	M. Bullock, Harley	44,919
18 January 1964	18th	Burnley	H	D	0–0		15,917
1 February 1964	19th	Ipswich Town	A	L	2–3	Regan, Farmer	13,349
8 February 1964	19th	Sheffield Wednesday	H	L	1–2	Harley	15,479
18 February 1964	20th	Everton	A	L	0–1		36,252
22 February 1964	20th	Liverpool	A	L	1–2	Leek	41,823
29 February 1964	20th	Tottenham Hotspur	H	L	1–2	Thomson	28,433
7 March 1964	20th	Wolverhampton Wanderers	A	L	1–5	Harley	16,421
13 March 1964	20th	Blackburn Rovers	H	D	2–2	Leek, Auld	15,809
20 March 1964	20th	Blackpool	A	L	0–3		10,203
28 March 1964	20th	Chelsea	H	L	3–4	Thwaites 2, Auld	14,485
30 March 1964	20th	Aston Villa	A	W	3–0	Harris, Hellawell, Lynn pen	25,797
31 March 1964	20th	Aston Villa	H	D	3–3	Bloomfield, Leek, Lynn pen	28,069
4 April 1964	20th	Nottingham Forest	A	L	0–4		13,897
11 April 1964	21st	Stoke City	H	L	0–1		19,914
17 April 1964	21st	West Ham United	A	L	0–5		22,106
22 April 1964	21st	Liverpool	H	W	3–1	Leek, Hellawell, Lynn pen	22,630
25 April 1964	20th	Sheffield United	H	W	3–0	Auld, Smith, Lynn pen	26,202

=== League table (part) ===
Final First Division table (part)
Pos	Club	Pld	W	D	L	F	A	GA	Pts
18th	Blackpool	42	13	9	20	52	73	0.71	35
19th	Aston Villa	42	11	12	19	62	71	0.87	34
20th	Birmingham City	42	11	7	24	54	92	0.59	29
21st	Bolton Wanderers	42	10	8	24	48	80	0.60	28
22nd	Ipswich Town	42	9	7	26	56	121	0.46	25
Key	Pos = League position; Pld = Matches played; W = Matches won; D = Matches drawn; L = Matches lost; F = Goals for; A = Goals against; GA = Goal average; Pts = Points								
Source									

== FA Cup ==
Round	Date	Opponents	Venue	Result	Score F–A	Scorers	Attendance
Third round	4 March 1964	Port Vale	H	L	1–2	Beard	21,615

== League Cup ==
Round	Date	Opponents	Venue	Result	Score F–A	Scorers	Attendance
Second round	25 September 1963	Norwich City	A	L	0–2		16,781

== Appearances and goals ==
Players marked † left the club during the playing season.
Key to positions: GK – Goalkeeper; FB – Full back; HB – Half back; FW – Forward

Players' appearances and goals by competition
Pos.	Nat.	Name	League		FA Cup		League Cup		Total	
Pos.	Nat.	Name	Apps	Goals	Apps	Goals	Apps	Goals	Apps	Goals
GK	ENG	Johnny Schofield	4	0	0	0	0	0	4	0
GK	ENG	Colin Withers	38	0	1	0	1	0	40	0
FB	WAL	Colin Green	33	0	1	0	1	0	35	0
FB	ENG	Stan Lynn	33	8	1	0	0	0	34	8
FB	ENG	Ray Martin	14	0	0	0	0	0	14	0
FB	ENG	Brian Rushton	3	0	0	0	1	0	4	0
HB	ENG	Malcolm Beard	36	1	1	1	1	0	38	2
HB	ENG	Mick Farmer	1	1	0	0	0	0	1	1
HB	ENG	Winston Foster	14	0	0	0	0	0	14	0
HB	WAL	Terry Hennessey	39	0	1	0	1	0	41	0
HB	ENG	Trevor Smith	34	2	1	0	1	0	36	2
FW	ENG	Geoff Anderson	1	0	0	0	0	0	1	0
FW	SCO	Bertie Auld	34	10	1	0	0	0	35	10
FW	ENG	Jimmy Bloomfield	34	3	1	0	1	0	36	3
FW	ENG	Mickey Bullock	2	1	0	0	0	0	2	1
FW	ENG	Peter Bullock	11	1	0	0	0	0	11	1
FW	ENG	Greg Farrell †	2 (Note: General source mistakenly includes Hellawell rather than Farrell in the team for the match against Everton in October.)	0	0	0	1	0	2	0
FW	SCO	Alex Harley	23	7	0	0	1	0	24	7
FW	ENG	Jimmy Harris	5	3	0	0	0	0	5	3
FW	ENG	Mike Hellawell	39	5	1	0	1	0	41	5
FW	WAL	Ken Leek	26	6	1	0	1	0	28	6
FW	ENG	John Regan	3	1	0	0	0	0	3	1
FW	SCO	Bobby Thomson	21	2	1	0	1	0	23	2
FW	ENG	Denis Thwaites	10	2	0	0	0	0	10	2
FW	ENG	Johnny Vincent	2	0	0	0	0	0	2	0

== See also ==
- Birmingham City F.C. seasons
