= 1965–66 Birmingham City F.C. season =

Birmingham City F.C.
1965–66 season
- Chairman: Clifford Coombs
- Manager: Joe Mallett; (until December 1965}; Stan Cullis
- Ground: St Andrew's
- Football League Second Division: 10th
- FA Cup: Fourth round (eliminated by Leicester City)
- Football League Cup: Second round (eliminated by Mansfield Town)
- Top goalscorer: League: Geoff Vowden (21); All: Geoff Vowden (23)
- Highest home attendance: 46,680 vs Leicester City, FA Cup 4th round 12 February 1966
- Lowest home attendance: 7,597 vs Leyton Orient, 8 September 1965
- Average home league attendance: 14,398
Home colours

The 1965–66 Football League season was Birmingham City Football Club's 63rd in the Football League and their 25th in the Second Division, to which they were relegated in 1964–65. Having persuaded former Wolverhampton Wanderers manager Stan Cullis out of retirement as successor to Joe Mallett, who remained with the club as Cullis's assistant, they finished in tenth position in the 22-team division. They entered the 1965–66 FA Cup in the third round proper and lost to Leicester City in the fourth, and were beaten in their opening second-round match in the League Cup by Mansfield Town.

Twenty-two players made at least one appearance in nationally organised first-team competition, and there were thirteen different goalscorers. Forward Alec Jackson played in all but two of the team's 45 matches, and Geoff Vowden finished as leading scorer with 23 goals, of which 21 came in league competition.

This season saw the introduction of substitutes into the Football League. In the third game of the season, away to Preston North End on 26 August, Brian Sharples replaced the injured Ron Wylie to become Birmingham's first Football League substitute.

== Football League Second Division ==
Date	League position	Opponents	Venue	Result	Score F–A	Scorers	Attendance
21 August 1965	7th	Crystal Palace	H	W	2–1	Thwaites 2	19,205
25 August 1965	6th	Middlesbrough	H	D	2–2	Beard	16,772
28 August 1965	8th	Preston North End	A	D	3–3	Vowden, Beard 2	16,397
31 August 1965	8th	Middlesbrough	A	D	1–1	Vowden	17,300
4 September 1965	9th	Charlton Athletic	H	D	2–2	Beard, Jackson pen	15,324
8 September 1965	10th	Leyton Orient	H	D	2–2	Thomson, Vowden	7,597
11 September 1965	13th	Plymouth Argyle	A	L	1–6	Vowden	10,777
13 September 1965	14th	Leyton Orient	A	L	1–2	Thomson	7,114
18 September 1965	19th	Portsmouth	H	L	1–3	Beard	11,790
25 September 1965	17th	Bolton Wanderers	A	W	2–1	Thomson, Vowden	12,117
9 October 1965	12th	Norwich City	H	W	1–0	Jackson	11,626
16 October 1965	16th	Bury	A	L	1–5	Darrell	8,184
23 October 1965	17th	Southampton	H	L	0–1		11,693
30 October 1965	21st	Derby County	A	L	3–5	Bullock, Vincent, Page	12,464
6 November 1965	17th	Cardiff City	H	W	4–2	Bullock, Thomson, Lynn pen, Jackson	10,744
13 November 1965	21st	Carlisle United	A	L	0–1		10,243
20 November 1965	21st	Coventry City	H	L	0–1		25,953
27 November 1965	21st	Bristol City	A	L	0–2		13,727
4 December 1965	20th	Manchester City	H	W	3–1	Jackson, Vowden, Thwaites	10,445
11 December 1965	17th	Rotherham United	A	W	4–3	Vowden 3, Jackson	10,684
18 December 1965	15th	Bury	H	W	4–0	Thomson, Thwaites 2, Fenton	10,998
28 December 1965	14th	Huddersfield Town	H	W	2–1	Vowden, Thwaites	19,763
1 January 1966	13th	Norwich City	A	D	2–2	Vowden, Fenton	15,297
8 January 1966	12th	Carlisle United	H	W	2–1	Vowden, Beard	14,998
29 January 1966	13th	Crystal Palace	A	L	0–1		14,090
5 February 1966	12th	Preston North End	H	D	1–1	Jackson	14,054
19 February 1966	14th	Charlton Athletic	A	L	1–2	Thwaites	13,742
26 February 1966	11th	Plymouth Argyle	H	W	1–0	Thomson	13,117
5 March 1966	10th	Southampton	A	W	1–0	Thwaites	18,295
12 March 1966	10th	Portsmouth	A	W	1–0	Vowden	12,367
15 March 1966	10th	Huddersfield Town	A	L	0–2		19,156
19 March 1966	11th	Bolton Wanderers	H	L	0–1		13,770
26 March 1966	11th	Ipswich Town	A	W	1–0	Beard	9,351
2 April 1966	8th	Cardiff City	A	W	3–1	Vowden, Carver og	8,150
9 April 1966	8th	Derby County	H	D	5–5	Vowden, Hockey, Beard 2 (1 pen), Saxton og	13,078
11 April 1966	10th	Wolverhampton Wanderers	H	D	2–2	Vincent, Vowden	28,902
12 April 1966	10th	Wolverhampton Wanderers	A	L	0–2		32,511
16 April 1966	10th	Coventry City	A	L	3–4	Fenton, Vowden, Jackson	27,111
22 April 1966	11th	Bristol City	H	L	1–3	Beard pen	11,732
30 April 1966	15th	Manchester City	A	L	1–3	Vowden	28,409
3 May 1966	9th	Ipswich Town	H	W	4–1	Fenton 2, Vowden, Jackson	9,331
17 May 1966	10th	Rotherham United	H	W	3–0	Barber, Vowden, Hockey	11,469

=== League table (part) ===
Final Second Division table (part)
Pos	Club	Pld	W	D	L	F	A	GA	Pts
8th	Derby County	42	16	11	15	71	68	1.04	43
9th	Bolton Wanderers	42	16	9	17	62	59	1.05	41
10th	Birmingham City	42	16	9	17	70	75	0.93	41
11th	Crystal Palace	42	14	13	15	47	52	0.90	41
12th	Portsmouth	42	16	8	18	74	78	0.95	40
Key	Pos = League position; Pld = Matches played; W = Matches won; D = Matches drawn; L = Matches lost; F = Goals for; A = Goals against; GA = Goal average; Pts = Points								

== FA Cup ==
Round	Date	Opponents	Venue	Result	Score F–A	Scorers	Attendance
Third round	22 January 1966	Bristol City	H	W	3–2	Vowden 2, Thomson	24,340
Fourth round	12 February 1966	Leicester City	H	L	1–2	Thwaites	46,680

== League Cup ==
Round	Date	Opponents	Venue	Result	Score F–A	Scorers	Attendance
Second round	22 September 1965	Mansfield Town	A	L	1–2	Beard	9,344

== Appearances and goals ==
Numbers in parentheses denote appearances made as a substitute.
Players marked † left the club during the playing season.
Key to positions: GK – Goalkeeper; FB – Full back; HB – Half back; FW – Forward

Players' appearances and goals by competition
Pos.	Nat.	Name	League		FA Cup		League Cup		Total	
Pos.	Nat.	Name	Apps	Goals	Apps	Goals	Apps	Goals	Apps	Goals
GK	SCO	Jim Herriot	35	0	2	0	0	0	37	0
GK	ENG	Johnny Schofield	7	0	0	0	1	0	8	0
FB	SCO	Cammie Fraser	33 (1)	0	2	0	1	0	36 (1)	0
FB	WAL	Colin Green	15	0	0	0	1	0	16	0
FB	ENG	Ray Martin	34	0	2	0	1	0	37	0
HB	ENG	Malcolm Beard	36	10	2	0	1	1	39	11
HB	ENG	Winston Foster	36	0	2	0	0	0	38	0
HB	WAL	Terry Hennessey †	15	0	0	0	1	0	16	0
HB	ENG	Stan Lynn	5	1	0	0	1	0	6	1
HB	WAL	Malcolm Page	8	1	0	0	0	0	8	1
HB	ENG	Brian Sharples	3 (1)	0	0	0	0	0	3 (1)	0
HB	SCO	Ron Wylie	38	0	2	0	1	0	41	0
FW	IRL	Eric Barber	2	1	0	0	0	0	2	1
FW	ENG	Mickey Bullock	4	2	0	0	0	0	4	2
FW	ENG	Mick Darrell	6	1	0	0	0	0	6	1
FW	ENG	Ron Fenton	15 (2)	5	0	0	1	0	16 (2)	5
FW	WAL	Trevor Hockey	24 (1)	2	2	0	0	0	26 (1)	2
FW	ENG	Alec Jackson	40	8	2	0	1	0	43	8
FW	SCO	Bobby Thomson	27 (1)	6	2	1	0	0	29 (1)	7
FW	ENG	Denis Thwaites	30	8	2	1	0	0	32	9
FW	ENG	Johnny Vincent	11	2	0	0	1	0	12	2
FW	ENG	Geoff Vowden	38	21	2	2	0	0	40	23

== See also ==
- Birmingham City F.C. seasons
