= 1964–65 Birmingham City F.C. season =

Birmingham City F.C.
1964–65 season
- Chairman: Harry Morris, Jr
- Manager: Joe Mallett
- Ground: St Andrew's
- Football League First Division: 22nd (relegated)
- FA Cup: Third round (eliminated by West Ham United)
- Football League Cup: Second round (eliminated by Chelsea)
- Top goalscorer: League: Stan Lynn, Geoff Vowden (10); All: Stan Lynn, Geoff Vowden (10)
- Highest home attendance: 33,833 vs Tottenham Hotspur, 2 January 1965
- Lowest home attendance: 8,877 vs Blackburn Rovers, 24 April 1965
- Average home league attendance: 19,714
Home colours

The 1964–65 Football League season was Birmingham City Football Club's 62nd in the Football League and their 38th in the First Division. Having replaced Gil Merrick as manager with coach Joe Mallett, newly arrived from Nottingham Forest, they finished bottom of the 22-team division so were relegated to the Second Division for the 1965–66 season. They lost their opening match in each of the cup competitions, to West Ham United in the third round proper of the 1964–65 FA Cup and to Chelsea in the second round of the League Cup.

Twenty-six players made at least one appearance in nationally organised first-team competition, and there were fifteen different goalscorers. Half back Winston Foster played in all 44 first-team matches over the season, and Stan Lynn and Geoff Vowden finished as joint leading goalscorers with only 10 goals each, all scored in league competition. Eight of Lynn's ten goals were scored from the penalty spot.

== Football League First Division ==
Date	League position	Opponents	Venue	Result	Score F–A	Scorers	Attendance
22 August 1964	15th	Nottingham Forest	A	L	3–4	Harley, Hellawell, Lynn pen	26,264
26 August 1964	14th	Fulham	H	D	2–2	Leek, Lynn pen	20,719
29 August 1964	19th	Stoke City	H	L	1–2	Lynn pen	20,667
2 September 1964	20th	Fulham	A	L	1–3	Beard	13,100
5 September 1964	20th	Tottenham Hotspur	A	L	1–4	Thomson	34,809
9 September 1964	20th	West Bromwich Albion	H	D	1–1	Thomson	26,568
12 September 1964	19th	Burnley	H	W	2–1	Thomson, Lynn pen	16,890
16 September 1964	17th	West Bromwich Albion	A	W	2–0	Auld, Williams og	24,535
19 September 1964	17th	Sheffield United	A	L	1–3	Thomson	16,390
26 September 1964	19th	Everton	H	L	3–5	Leek, Hellawell, Hennessey	21,240
30 September 1964	17th	Wolverhampton Wanderers	A	W	2–0	Leek, Lynn	21,435
10 October 1964	19th	Liverpool	H	D	0–0		19,929
17 October 1964	17th	Sheffield Wednesday	A	L	2–5	Auld, Hennessey	15,345
24 October 1964	18th	Blackpool	H	W	3–0	Vowden, Leek, Lynn pen	15,916
31 October 1964	19th	Blackburn Rovers	A	L	1–3	Harley	13,721
7 November 1964	19th	Arsenal	H	L	2–3	Vowden, Leek	20,602
14 November 1964	19th	Leeds United	A	L	1–4	Thomson	32,276
22 November 1964	19th	Chelsea	H	L	1–6	Jackson	19,803
28 November 1964	19th	Leicester City	A	D	4–4	Thomson 2 (1 pen), Vowden, Thwaites	15,848
5 December 1964	19th	Sunderland	H	W	4–3	Thomson, Sharples, Jackson, Thwaites	13,564
12 December 1964	19th	Nottingham Forest	H	D	1–1	Thomson	14,011
16 December 1964	19th	Manchester United	A	D	1–1	Thwaites	25,938
26 December 1964	19th	West Ham United	H	W	2–1	Thwaites, Lynn	23,324
28 December 1964	19th	West Ham United	A	L	1–2	Sharples	23,855
2 January 1965	19th	Tottenham Hotspur	H	W	1–0	Beard	33,833
16 January 1965	19th	Burnley	A	L	0–2		9,971
23 January 1965	19th	Sheffield United	H	D	1–1	Foster	16,675
6 February 1965	19th	Everton	A	D	1–1	Fenton	34,033
13 February 1965	19th	Aston Villa	H	L	0–1		32,491
24 February 1965	20th	Liverpool	A	L	3–4	Vowden, Fenton, Thwaites	39,253
27 February 1965	20th	Sheffield Wednesday	H	D	0–0		12,138
6 March 1965	20th	Blackpool	A	L	1–3	Vowden	11,464
13 March 1965	20th	Wolverhampton Wanderers	H	L	0–1		18,740
17 March 1965	20th	Stoke City	A	L	1–2	Vowden	12,923
3 April 1965	21st	Chelsea	A	L	1–3	Lynn pen	28,975
6 April 1965	21st	Arsenal	A	L	0–3		16,048
10 April 1965	21st	Leicester City	H	W	2–0	Vowden, Jackson	12,460
12 April 1965	21st	Aston Villa	A	L	0–3		36,871
17 April 1965	22nd	Sunderland	A	L	1–2	Lynn pen	31,958
19 April 1965	22nd	Manchester United	H	L	2–4	Vowden, Thwaites	28,914
24 April 1965	22nd	Blackburn Rovers	H	D	5–5	Vowden, Beard 3, Lynn pen	8,877
26 April 1965	22nd	Leeds United	H	D	3–3	Vowden, Beard, Thwaites	16,638

=== League table (part) ===
Final First Division table (part)
Pos	Club	Pld	W	D	L	F	A	GA	Pts
18th	Leicester City	42	11	13	18	69	85	0.81	39
19th	Sheffield United	42	12	11	19	50	64	0.78	45
20th	Fulham	42	11	12	19	60	78	0.77	34
21st	Wolverhampton Wanderers	42	13	4	25	59	89	0.66	30
22nd	Birmingham City	42	8	11	23	64	96	0.67	27
Key	Pos = League position; Pld = Matches played; W = Matches won; D = Matches drawn; L = Matches lost; F = Goals for; A = Goals against; GA = Goal average; Pts = Points								
Source									

== FA Cup ==
Round	Date	Opponents	Venue	Result	Score F–A	Scorers	Attendance
Third round	9 January 1965	West Ham United	A	L	2–4	Jackson, Thwaites	31,056

== League Cup ==
Round	Date	Opponents	Venue	Result	Score F–A	Scorers	Attendance
Second round	23 September 1964	Chelsea	A	L	0–3		15,255

== Appearances and goals ==
Players marked † left the club during the playing season.
Key to positions: GK – Goalkeeper; FB – Full back; HB – Half back; FW – Forward

Players' appearances and goals by competition
Pos.	Nat.	Name	League		FA Cup		League Cup		Total	
Pos.	Nat.	Name	Apps	Goals	Apps	Goals	Apps	Goals	Apps	Goals
GK	ENG	Len Beel	1	0	0	0	0	0	1	0
GK	ENG	Johnny Schofield	36	0	1	0	1	0	38	0
GK	ENG	Colin Withers †	5	0	0	0	0	0	5	0
FB	WAL	Colin Green	22	0	1	0	0	0	23	0
FB	ENG	Stan Lynn	39	10	1	0	1	0	41	10
FB	ENG	Ray Martin	20	0	0	0	1	0	21	0
HB	ENG	Malcolm Beard	39	6	1	0	1	0	41	6
HB	ENG	Winston Foster	42	1	1	0	1	0	44	1
HB	WAL	Terry Hennessey	38	2	1	0	1	0	40	2
HB	WAL	Malcolm Page	8	0	0	0	0	0	8	0
HB	ENG	Trevor Smith †	4	0	0	0	0	0	4	0
FW	SCO	Bertie Auld	17	2	1	0	1	0	19	2
FW	ENG	Mickey Bullock	7	0	0	0	0	0	7	0
FW	ENG	Peter Bullock †	1	0	0	0	0	0	1	0
FW	ENG	Ron Fenton	6	2	0	0	0	0	6	2
FW	SCO	Cammie Fraser	5	0	0	0	0	0	5	0
FW	SCO	Alex Harley †	5	2	0	0	0	0	5	2
FW	ENG	Mike Hellawell †	16	2	0	0	1	0	17	2
FW	ENG	Alec Jackson	36	3	1	1	1	0	38	4
FW	WAL	Ken Leek †	14	5	0	0	1	0	15	5
FW	ENG	Brian Sharples	19	2	1	0	0	0	20	2
FW	SCO	Bobby Thomson	25	9	0	0	1	0	26	9
FW	ENG	Denis Thwaites	26	7	1	1	0	0	27	8
FW	ENG	Johnny Vincent	5	0	0	0	0	0	5	0
FW	ENG	Geoff Vowden	27	10	1	0	0	0	28	10

== See also ==
- Birmingham City F.C. seasons
