= 1967–68 Birmingham City F.C. season =

Birmingham City F.C.
1967–68 season
- Chairman: Clifford Coombs
- Manager: Stan Cullis
- Ground: St Andrew's
- Football League Second Division: 4th
- FA Cup: Semi-final (eliminated by West Bromwich Albion)
- Football League Cup: Third round (eliminated by Chelsea)
- Top goalscorer: League: Barry Bridges (23); All: Barry Bridges (28)
- Highest home attendance: 51,586 vs Arsenal, FA Cup 5th round replay, 12 March 1968
- Lowest home attendance: 19,916 vs Charlton Athletic, 7 May 1968
- Average home league attendance: 28,083
Home colours

The 1967–68 Football League season was Birmingham City Football Club's 65th in the Football League and their 27th in the Second Division. They finished in fourth position in the 22-team division. They entered the 1967–68 FA Cup in the third round proper, and defeated Arsenal (in a replay) and then Chelsea in front of crowds in excess of 50,000 to reach the semi-final, in which they lost 2–0 to local rivals West Bromwich Albion. They entered at the second round of the League Cup and lost in the third to Chelsea.

Twenty-two players made at least one appearance in nationally organised first-team competition, and there were eleven different goalscorers. Forwards Barry Bridges and Fred Pickering played in all 50 first-team matches over the season; midfielder Malcolm Beard missed only one. Bridges finished as leading goalscorer with 28 goals, of which 23 came in league competition.

== Football League Second Division ==
Date	League position	Opponents	Venue	Result	Score F–A	Scorers	Attendance
19 August 1967	1st	Bolton Wanderers	H	W	4–0	Vincent, Bridges 2, Hockey	23,537
26 August 1967	5th	Huddersfield Town	A	W	3–2	Vincent, Vowden 2	14,228
29 August 1967	4th	Middlesbrough	A	D	1–1	Vincent	25,814
2 September 1967	5th	Ipswich Town	H	D	0–0		25,463
4 September 1967	2nd	Hull City	H	W	6–2	Pickering, Vincent, Vowden, Bridges, Beard pen, Murray	25,913
9 September 1967	5th	Carlisle United	A	D	1–1	Vowden	11,200
16 September 1967	6th	Blackburn Rovers	H	D	1–1	Bridges	28,972
23 September 1967	8th	Blackpool	A	L	0–1		25,572
26 September 1967	5th	Middlesbrough	H	W	6–1	Pickering 2, Vincent, Bridges 2, Vowden	28,885
30 September 1967	8th	Millwall	A	L	2–3	Pickering, Vincent	30,567
7 October 1967	7th	Aston Villa	A	W	4–2	Bridges 2, Beard pen, Vowden	50,067
14 October 1967	6th	Portsmouth	H	D	2–2	Pickering, Vowden	26,243
21 October 1967	7th	Norwich City	A	L	2–4	Vowden, Bridges	16,490
28 October 1967	6th	Rotherham United	H	W	4–1	Bridges 3, Vowden	21,478
4 November 1967	6th	Derby County	A	D	2–2	Vincent, Bridges	25,484
11 November 1967	6th	Preston North End	H	W	3–0	Vincent 2, Bridges	27,664
18 November 1967	5th	Cardiff City	A	W	3–1	Vincent, Bridges, Murray	13,673
25 November 1967	4th	Crystal Palace	H	W	1–0	Vincent	27,538
2 December 1967	5th	Charlton Athletic	A	L	1–3	Bridges	13,855
9 December 1967	2nd	Queens Park Rangers	H	W	2–0	Pickering, Hazell og	25,281
16 December 1967	4th	Bolton Wanderers	A	D	1–1	Farrimond og	10,468
23 December 1967	2nd	Huddersfield Town	H	W	6–1	Pickering 2, Vincent, Vowden, Bridges, Leggat	26,163
26 December 1967	1st	Bristol City	H	W	4–1	Bridges, Vowden, Leggat, Briggs og	40,429
30 December 1967	3rd	Bristol City	A	L	1–3	Vincent	23,493
6 January 1967	4th	Ipswich Town	A	L	1–2	Vowden	16,701
13 January 1968	4th	Carlisle United	H	L	1–3	Vowden	21,686
20 January 1968	4th	Blackburn Rovers	A	W	2–1	Pickering, Vowden	17,934
3 February 1968	5th	Blackpool	H	L	1–2	Wylie	29,646
10 February 1968	5th	Millwall	A	D	1–1	Vowden	13,961
24 February 1968	5th	Aston Villa	H	W	2–1	Bridges 2	45,283
2 March 1968	5th	Portsmouth	A	W	2–1	Pickering, Foster	27,836
16 March 1968	5th	Norwich City	H	D	0–0		28,951
23 March 1968	5th	Rotherham United	A	D	1–1	Pickering	16,025
2 April 1968	5th	Derby County	H	W	3–1	Vowden, Bridges, Richardson og	29,327
6 April 1968	5th	Preston North End	A	D	0–0		16,876
13 April 1968	5th	Cardiff City	H	D	0–0		29,044
15 April 1968	5th	Plymouth Argyle	A	W	2–1	Pickering, Vowden	13,886
16 April 1968	4th	Plymouth Argyle	H	D	2–2	Page, Wylie	29,359
20 April 1968	5th	Crystal Palace	A	D	0–0		14,949
4 May 1968	5th	Queens Park Rangers	A	L	0–2		25,985
7 May 1968	4th	Charlton Athletic	H	W	4–0	Pickering, Bridges 2, Vincent	19,916
11 May 1968	4th	Hull City	A	W	1–0	Wilson og	10,346

=== League table (part) ===
Final Second Division table (part)
Pos	Club	Pld	W	D	L	F	A	GA	Pts
2nd	Queens Park Rangers	42	25	8	9	67	36	1.86	58
3rd	Blackpool	42	24	10	8	71	43	1.65	58
4th	Birmingham City	42	19	14	9	83	51	1.63	52
5th	Portsmouth	42	18	13	11	68	55	1.24	49
6th	Middlesbrough	42	17	12	13	60	54	1.11	46
Key	Pos = League position; Pld = Matches played; W = Matches won; D = Matches drawn; L = Matches lost; F = Goals for; A = Goals against; GA = Goal average; Pts = Points								

== FA Cup ==
Round	Date	Opponents	Venue	Result	Score F–A	Scorers	Attendance
Third round	27 January 1968	Halifax Town	A	W	4–2	Pickering, Vowden, Bridges, Beard	18,117
Fourth round	17 February 1968	Leyton Orient	H	W	3–0	Vowden 2, Bridges	29,320
Fifth round	9 March 1968	Arsenal	A	D	1–1	Vowden	45,515
Fifth round replay	12 March 1968	Arsenal	H	W	2–1	Bridges 2	51,586
Sixth round	30 March 1968	Chelsea	H	W	1–0	Pickering 64'	51,576
Semi-final	27 April 1968	West Bromwich Albion	Villa Park, Birmingham	L	0–2		60,831

== League Cup ==
Round	Date	Opponents	Venue	Result	Score F–A	Scorers	Attendance
Second round	13 September 1967	Plymouth Argyle	A	W	2–0	Vowden, Hockey	10,038
Third round	11 October 1967	Derby County	H	L	1–3	Bridges	24,827

== Appearances and goals ==
Numbers in parentheses denote appearances made as a substitute.
Players marked † left the club during the playing season.
Key to positions: GK – Goalkeeper; DF – Defender; MF – Midfielder; FW – Forward

Players' appearances and goals by competition
Pos.	Nat.	Name	League		FA Cup		League Cup		Total	
Pos.	Nat.	Name	Apps	Goals	Apps	Goals	Apps	Goals	Apps	Goals
GK	SCO	Jim Herriot	40	0	6	0	2	0	48	0
GK	ENG	Terry Twell	2	0	0	0	0	0	2	0
DF	ENG	Winston Foster	16	1	6	0	0	0	22	1
DF	WAL	Colin Green	26	0	5	0	1	0	32	0
DF	ENG	Ray Martin	21 (5)	0	4 (1)	0	1	0	26 (6)	0
DF	ENG	Bert Murray	40	2	5	0	2	0	47	2
DF	ENG	Brian Sharples	7	0	0	0	0	0	7	0
DF	ENG	John Sleeuwenhoek	12	0	0	0	0	0	12	0
MF	ENG	Malcolm Beard	41	2	6	1	2	0	49	3
MF	ENG	Ron Fenton †	1	0	0	0	0	0	1	0
MF	WAL	Malcolm Page	20 (1)	1	4	0	2	0	26 (1)	1
MF	SCO	Bobby Thomson †	1 (1)	0	0	0	0	0	1 (1)	0
MF	SCO	Ron Wylie	39	2	6	0	2	0	47	2
FW	ENG	Barry Bridges	42	23	6	4	2	1	50	28
FW	ENG	Mick Darrell	0 (1)	0	0	0	0	0	0 (1)	0
FW	WAL	Trevor Hockey	30	1	3	0	2	1	35	2
FW	SCO	Graham Leggat	4 (3)	2	0	0	0	0	4 (3)	2
FW	ENG	Fred Pickering	42	13	6	2	2	0	50	15
FW	ENG	Phil Summerill	1	0	0	0	0	0	1	0
FW	ENG	Denis Thwaites	1	0	0	0	0	0	1	0
FW	ENG	Johnny Vincent	36 (1)	14	3	0	2	0	41 (1)	14
FW	ENG	Geoff Vowden	40	17	6	4	2	1	48	22

== See also ==
- Birmingham City F.C. seasons
