= 1966–67 Birmingham City F.C. season =

Birmingham City F.C.
1966–67 season
- Chairman: Clifford Coombs
- Manager: Stan Cullis
- Ground: St Andrew's
- Football League Second Division: 10th
- FA Cup: Sixth round (eliminated by Tottenham Hotspur)
- Football League Cup: Semi-final (eliminated by Queens Park Rangers)
- Top goalscorer: League: Geoff Vowden (16); All: Geoff Vowden (21)
- Highest home attendance: 51,467 vs Tottenham Hotspur, FA Cup 6th round 8 April 1967
- Lowest home attendance: 14,023 vs Charlton Athletic, 12 November 1966
- Average home league attendance: 19,798
Home colours

The 1966–67 Football League season was Birmingham City Football Club's 64th season in the Football League and their 26th in the Second Division. Birmingham finished in tenth position in the 22-team division. They entered the 1966–67 FA Cup in the third round proper and lost to Tottenham Hotspur in the sixth round after a replay. They entered at the second round of the League Cup and reached the semi-final, in which they lost heavily to Queens Park Rangers over two legs.

Twenty-three players made at least one appearance in nationally organised first-team competition, and there were thirteen different goalscorers. Goalkeeper Jim Herriot played in all 55 first-team matches over the season; among outfield players, half-back Malcolm Beard and forward Geoff Vowden missed only one. Vowden finished as leading goalscorer with 21 goals, of which 16 came in league competition.

== Football League Second Division ==
Date	League position	Opponents	Venue	Result	Score F–A	Scorers	Attendance
20 August 1966	7th	Wolverhampton Wanderers	A	W	2–1	Murray 2	26,800
24 August 1966	4th	Portsmouth	A	W	5–4	Bridges, Vowden 2, Murray, Beard	16,934
27 August 1966	3rd	Norwich City	H	W	2–1	Vowden, Murray	25,516
30 August 1966	1st	Portsmouth	H	W	3–0	Thomson, Vowden, Pack og	23,493
3 September 1966	1st	Coventry City	A	D	1–1	Vowden	36,400
7 September 1966	2nd	Plymouth Argyle	A	D	1–1	Murray	19,008
10 September 1966	5th	Bury	H	L	1–3	Thomson	22,445
17 September 1966	6th	Preston North End	A	L	0–3		13,577
24 September 1966	9th	Rotherham United	H	L	2–3	Bridges, Thomson	19,515
27 September 1966	8th	Plymouth Argyle	H	D	0–0		18,313
1 October 1966	12th	Millwall	A	L	1–3	Vowden	15,776
8 October 1966	13th	Ipswich Town	A	L	2–3	Thomson, Vowden	15,122
15 October 1966	12th	Bristol City	H	W	4–0	Vowden, Murray, Thwaites, Ford og	15,358
22 October 1966	13th	Carlisle United	A	L	0–2		10,900
29 October 1966	13th	Blackburn Rovers	H	D	1–1	Beard	17,626
5 November 1966	16th	Bolton Wanderers	A	L	1–3	Hockey	10,030
12 November 1966	14th	Charlton Athletic	H	W	4–0	Bullock, Vincent, Vowden 2	14,023
19 November 1966	13th	Derby County	A	W	2–1	Beard, Thomson	17,382
26 November 1966	11th	Crystal Palace	H	W	3–1	Bullock, Vincent, Vowden	16,820
3 December 1966	13th	Huddersfield Town	A	L	1–3	Bullock	14,930
10 December 1966	13th	Cardiff City	H	L	1–2	Bullock	17,046
17 December 1966	13th	Wolverhampton Wanderers	H	W	3–2	Bullock, Vowden, Bridges	27,542
26 December 1966	13th	Northampton Town	H	W	3–0	Vincent 2, Vowden	24,302
27 December 1966	13th	Northampton Town	A	L	1–2	Bridges	15,433
31 December 1966	13th	Norwich City	A	D	3–3	Bullock, Vowden, Bridges	15,260
7 January 1967	12th	Coventry City	H	D	1–1	Curtis og	36,316
14 January 1967	11th	Bury	A	W	2–0	Bridges 2	6,956
21 January 1967	9th	Preston North End	H	W	3–1	Vowden, Bridges 2	18,486
4 February 1967	11th	Rotherham United	A	L	2–3	Leggat, Hockey	10,934
11 February 1967	9th	Millwall	H	W	2–0	Bullock, Bridges	18,008
25 February 1967	9th	Ipswich Town	H	D	2–2	Vincent, Thomson	18,491
4 March 1967	10th	Blackburn Rovers	A	L	0–1		14,908
18 March 1967	12th	Carlisle United	H	L	1–2	Vincent	17,613
25 March 1967	12th	Bristol City	A	L	1–3	Vincent	20,594
27 March 1967	11th	Hull City	H	W	2–1	Beard, Isherwood	17,066
28 March 1967	9th	Hull City	A	W	2–0	Murray 2	23,122
1 April 1967	9th	Bolton Wanderers	H	D	2–2	Vowden, Murray	18,187
15 April 1967	9th	Derby County	H	W	2–0	Bridges 2	15,200
22 April 1967	9th	Crystal Palace	A	L	1–2	Bridges	13,064
28 April 1967	10th	Huddersfield Town	H	L	0–1		14,385
6 May 1967	10th	Cardiff City	A	L	0–3		12,678
12 May 1967	10th	Charlton Athletic	A	L	0–1		10,147

=== League table (part) ===
Final Second Division table (part)
Pos	Club	Pld	W	D	L	F	A	GA	Pts
8th	Millwall	42	18	9	15	49	58	0.84	45
9th	Bolton Wanderers	42	14	14	14	64	58	1.10	42
10th	Birmingham City	42	16	8	18	70	66	1.06	40
11th	Norwich City	42	13	14	15	49	55	0.89	40
12th	Hull City	42	16	7	19	77	72	1.07	39
Key	Pos = League position; Pld = Matches played; W = Matches won; D = Matches drawn; L = Matches lost; F = Goals for; A = Goals against; GA = Goal average; Pts = Points								

== FA Cup ==
Round	Date	Opponents	Venue	Result	Score F–A	Scorers	Attendance
Third round	28 January 1967	Blackpool	H	W	2–1	Vowden, Thomson	27,603
Fourth round	18 February 1967	Rotherham United	A	D	0–0		15,723
Fourth round replay	21 February 1967	Rotherham United	H	W	2–1	Hockey, Bridges	35,482
Fifth round	11 March 1967	Arsenal	H	W	1–0	Vowden	40,665
Sixth round	8 April 1967	Tottenham Hotspur	H	D	0–0		51,467
Sixth round replay	12 April 1967	Tottenham Hotspur	A	L	0–6		52,304

== League Cup ==
Round	Date	Opponents	Venue	Result	Score F–A	Scorers	Attendance
Second round	13 September 1966	Nottingham Forest	A	D	1–1	Vowden	19,271
Second round replay	20 September 1966	Nottingham Forest	H	W	2–1	Bridges, Vowden	21,510
Third round	4 October 1966	Ipswich Town	H	W	2–1	Beard pen, Hockey	15,116
Fourth round	26 October 1966	Grimsby Town	A	W	4–2	Bridges 2, Fenton, Vowden	11,298
Fifth round	7 December 1966	Sheffield United	A	W	3–2	Vincent, Bullock, Hockey	15,023
Semi-final 1st leg	17 January 1967	Queens Park Rangers	H	L	1–4	Bridges	34,295
Semi-final 2nd leg	7 February 1967	Queens Park Rangers	A	L	1–3	Barber	24,604

== Appearances and goals ==
Numbers in parentheses denote appearances made as a substitute.
Players marked † left the club during the playing season.
Key to positions: GK – Goalkeeper; FB – Full back; HB – Half back; FW – Forward

Players' appearances and goals by competition
Pos.	Nat.	Name	League		FA Cup		League Cup		Total	
Pos.	Nat.	Name	Apps	Goals	Apps	Goals	Apps	Goals	Apps	Goals
GK	SCO	Jim Herriot	42	0	6	0	7	0	55	0
FB	WAL	Colin Green	40	0	5	0	7	0	52	0
FB	ENG	Dennis Isherwood	5	1	0	0	0	0	5	1
FB	ENG	Ray Martin	19	0	1	0	5	0	25	0
FB	ENG	Bert Murray	37 (3)	9	6	0	6	0	49 (3)	9
HB	ENG	Malcolm Beard	41	4	6	0	7	1	54	5
HB	ENG	Winston Foster	16 (1)	0	1	0	3	0	20 (1)	0
HB	WAL	Malcolm Page	0 (1)	0	0	0	0	0	0 (1)	0
HB	ENG	Brian Sharples	27	0	5	0	4	0	36	0
HB	SCO	Bobby Thomson	35 (1)	6	6	1	6	0	47 (1)	7
HB	SCO	Ron Wylie	21	0	2	0	4	0	27	0
FW	IRL	Eric Barber	1 (1)	0	2	0	1	1	4 (1)	1
FW	ENG	Barry Bridges	39	13	6	1	7	4	42	18
FW	ENG	Mickey Bullock	14	7	1	0	3	1	18	10
FW	ENG	Mick Darrell	0 (1)	0	0	0	0	0	0 (1)	0
FW	ENG	Ron Fenton (Note: Matthews source omits Fenton's substitute appearance against Arsenal in the FA Cup.)	6 (3)	0	1 (2)	0	0 (1)	1	7 (6)	1
FW	WAL	Trevor Hockey	39	2	6	1	7	2	52	5
FW	ENG	Alec Jackson †	2	0	0 (1)	0	1	0	3 (1)	0
FW	SCO	Graham Leggat	9	1	3	0	0	0	12	1
FW	ENG	Phil Summerill	3	0	0	0	0	0	3	0
FW	ENG	Denis Thwaites	3 (2)	1	0	0	1	0	4 (2)	1
FW	ENG	Johnny Vincent	22	7	3	0	1	1	26	8
FW	ENG	Geoff Vowden	41	16	6	2	7	3	54	21

== See also ==
- Birmingham City F.C. seasons
