= 1962–63 Aston Villa F.C. season =

English football club season

Aston Villa
1962–63 season
- Manager: Joe Mercer
- Stadium: Villa Park
- First Division: 15th
- FA Cup: Fourth round
- League Cup: Runner-up

The 1962–63 English football season was Aston Villa's 64th season in The Football League. Villa played in the First Division. Winning the League Cup in 1961 had been the recent pinnacle for the club. Decline would see them finish in 15th place in 1963.

The Big Freeze of 1962–1963, was one of the coldest winters on record and greatly affected Villa's season. Football matches in the English and Scottish leagues suffered because of the severe effects of the winter weather. Some matches in the FA Cup were rescheduled ten or more times. Matches in the fifth and sixth rounds, scheduled for 16 February and 9 March respectively, were played on 16 and 30 March. A board known as the Pools Panel was set up to adjudicate postponed matches to provide the football pool results. From 15 December to 12 January, Villa completed no competitive matches. The delays occurred before under-soil heating became widespread at major venues. When the thaw arrived, a backlog of fixtures had to be hastily determined. The Football League season was extended by four weeks from its original finishing date of 27 April. The final league fixtures took place one day before the rescheduled FA Cup final.

In the Second City derby both teams won their home fixture.

There were debuts for Lew Chatterley (153), Phil Woosnam (106), Cammie Fraser (33), John Gavan (12), and George Graham (8).

== First Division ==
Pos	Team	Pld	W	D	L	GF	GA	GAv	Pts
13	Blackpool	42	13	14	15	58	64	0.906	40
14	West Bromwich Albion	42	16	7	19	71	79	0.899	39
15	Aston Villa	42	15	8	19	62	68	0.912	38
16	Fulham	42	14	10	18	50	71	0.704	38
17	Ipswich Town	42	12	11	19	59	78	0.756	35

Source: World Football
Rules for classification: 1) Points; 2) Goal average; 3) Goals scored

=== Matches ===
Date	Opponent	Venue	Result	Note	Scorers
18 Aug 1962	West Ham	H	3–1	—	Derek Dougan 1', Jimmy MacEwan 2', Bobby Thomson 46'
20 Aug 1962	Tottenham	H	2–1	—	Derek Dougan 51', 52'
25 Aug 1962	Manchester City	A	2–0	—	Bobby Thomson 63', Harry Burrows 70'
29 Aug 1962	Tottenham	A	2–4	—	Derek Dougan 61', Alan Deakin 80'
1 Sep 1962	Blackpool	H	1–1	—	Jimmy MacEwan 18'
4 Sep 1962	Arsenal	A	2–1	—	Bobby Thomson 6', 25'
8 Sep 1962	Blackburn	A	1–4	—	Harry Burrows 42'
10 Sep 1962	Arsenal	H	3–1	—	Bobby Thomson, Harry Burrows, Jimmy MacEwan
15 Sep 1962	Sheffield United	H	1–2	—	Own goal 83'
22 Sep 1962	Nottingham Forest	A	1–3	—	Harry Burrows 88' (pen)
29 Sep 1962	Ipswich Town	H	4–2	—	Ron Wylie 2', Bobby Thomson 20', 69', Derek Dougan 61'
6 Oct 1962	West Bromwich Albion	H	2–0	—	Alan Baker 10', Harry Burrows 58' (pen)
13 Oct 1962	Everton	A	1–1	—	Alan Baker 77'
20 Oct 1962	Orient	H	1–0	—	Harry Burrows 77'
27 Oct 1962	Birmingham City	A	2–3	—	Alan O’Neill 55', Harry Burrows 60' (pen)
3 Nov 1962	Fulham	H	1–2	—	Harry Burrows 83' (pen)
10 Nov 1962	Sheffield Wednesday	A	0–0	—	—
17 Nov 1962	Burnley	H	2–1	—	Harry Burrows 7', Derek Dougan 20'
24 Nov 1962	Manchester United	A	2–2	—	Own goal 5', Derek Dougan 52'
1 Dec 1962	Bolton	H	5–0	—	Harry Burrows 12', Jimmy MacEwan 60', 77', Bobby Thomson 62', Derek Dougan 72'
8 Dec 1962	Leicester City	A	3–3	—	Own goal 1', Jimmy MacEwan 19', Harry Burrows 56'
15 Dec 1962	West Ham	A	1–1	—	Bobby Thomson 65'
19 Jan 1963	Blackburn	H	0–0	—	—
13 Feb 1963	Liverpool	A	0–4	—	—
9 Mar 1963	Orient	A	2–0	—	Phil Woosnam 7', Ron Wylie 37'
16 Mar 1963	Birmingham City	H	4–0	—	Phil Woosnam 23', Alan Deakin 27', Alan Baker 31', Harry Burrows 51' (pen)
23 Mar 1963	Fulham	A	0–1	—	—
29 Mar 1963	Blackpool	A	0–4	—	—
1 Apr 1963	Everton	H	0–2	—	—
6 Apr 1963	Burnley	A	1–3	—	Vic Crowe 19'
9 Apr 1963	Manchester United	H	1–2	—	Bobby Thomson 75'
13 Apr 1963	Sheffield Wednesday	H	0–2	—	—
15 Apr 1963	Wolves	A	1–3	—	Own goal 44'
16 Apr 1963	Wolves	H	0–2	—	—
20 Apr 1963	Bolton	A	1–4	—	Harry Burrows
1 May 1963	Sheffield United	A	1–2	—	Harry Burrows 38'
4 May 1963	Nottingham Forest	H	0–2	—	—
8 May 1963	Manchester City	H	3–1	—	Alan Baker 15', Harry Burrows 21' (pen), 23' (pen)
11 May 1963	West Bromwich Albion	A	0–1	—	—
15 May 1963	Leicester City	H	3–1	—	Cammie Fraser 67', Derek Dougan 69', Gordon Lee 79'
18 May 1963	Liverpool	H	2–0	—	George Graham 78', Bobby Thomson 84'
21 May 1963	Ipswich Town	A	1–1	—	Bobby Thomson 69'

== FA Cup ==
=== Third round ===
The 44 First and Second Division clubs entered the competition at this stage. The matches were scheduled for Saturday, 5 January 1963, but due to the Big Freeze of 1963, only three games were completed at this date. The bulk of matches were not completed until February and March, with the final non-replay tie being played on 7 March. There were nine replays in total, of which the earliest possible playing date was 30 January, and the latest the 11 March.

Tie no	Home team	Score	Away team	Date
1	Bristol City	1–1	Aston Villa	16 January 1963
Replay	Aston Villa	3–2	Bristol City	7 March 1963

=== Fourth round ===
The matches were originally scheduled for Saturday, 26 January 1963, but due to the earlier, ongoing problems with the winter of 1963, most of the third-round games had still not been played and only one tie, the Burnley – Liverpool match, was able to be played on that day. This and three other games went to replays, with the Portsmouth – Coventry City match requiring a second replay, which was the last match of the round. Gravesend & Northfleet was the last non-league club left in the competition.

Tie no	Home team	Score	Away team	Date
10	Manchester United	1–0	Aston Villa	11 March 1963

== League Cup ==
=== Second round ===
Home team	Score	Away team	Date
Aston Villa	6–1	Peterborough United	24-09-1962

=== Third round ===
Home team	Score	Away team	Date
Aston Villa	3–1	Stoke City	17-10-1962

=== Fourth round ===
Home team	Score	Away team	Date
Aston Villa	6–2	Preston North End	12-11-1962

=== Fifth round ===
Home team	Score	Away team	Date
Aston Villa	4–1	Norwich City	03-12-1962

=== Semi-finals - First leg ===
Home team	Score	Away team	Date
Sunderland	1–3	Aston Villa	12-01-1963

=== Second leg ===
Home team	Score	Away team	Date	Agg
Aston Villa	0–0	Sunderland	22-04-1963	3–1

=== Final ===
Second City Derby
- 28--19--22

The final was played over two legs. The first leg was held at St Andrew's, Birmingham on 23 May 1963 and the second leg was held at Villa Park, Birmingham, on 27 May 1963.

23 May 1963

Birmingham City	3–1	Aston Villa
Bloomfield; Leek	Summary	Thomson

St Andrew's, Birmingham
Attendance: 31,580
Referee: E. Crawford
27 May 1963

Aston Villa	0–0	Birmingham City
	Summary

Villa Park, Birmingham
Attendance: 37,921
Referee: A.W. Sparling

Birmingham City won 3–1 on aggregate.
