= 1963 Football League Cup final =

- Event: 1962–63 Football League Cup
| Birmingham City | Aston Villa |
| 3 | 1 |
- on aggregate

First leg
| Birmingham City | Aston Villa |
| 3 | 1 |
- Date: 23 May 1963
- Venue: St Andrew's, Birmingham
- Referee: E. Crawford
- Attendance: 31,850

Second leg
| Aston Villa | Birmingham City |
| 0 | 0 |
- Date: 27 May 1963
- Venue: Villa Park, Birmingham
- Referee: A. W. Sparling
- Attendance: 37,921

The 1963 Football League Cup final, the third to be staged since the competition's inception, was contested between local rivals Birmingham City and Aston Villa over two legs. Aston Villa had won the inaugural competition in 1960–61, and had beaten Birmingham 4–0 in their most recent League meeting, while Birmingham were seeking to win their first major trophy. Birmingham won 3–1 on aggregate, with all the goals coming in the first leg.

== Match summary ==
The first leg took place on 23 May 1963 at Birmingham's home ground, St Andrew's. Birmingham took the lead when Harris fed Auld who crossed for Ken Leek's powerful shot, but Aston Villa equalised via Bobby Thomson. Seven minutes into the second half, the same combination of players made it 2–1, and after 66 minutes Jimmy Bloomfield met a Harris cross to score off the post to give Birmingham a 3–1 lead. The second leg four days later at Villa Park was goalless. With former England centre half Trevor Smith marking Thomson out of the game and Birmingham's defensive tactics including regularly kicking the ball out for throw-ins, Aston Villa were unable to break their opponents down.

== Details ==
=== First leg ===
23 May 1963

| Birmingham City | 3–1 | Aston Villa |
|---|---|---|
| Leek 14', 52'; Bloomfield 66' | | Thomson 41' |

St Andrew's, Birmingham
Attendance: 31,580
Referee: E. Crawford

| 1 | (England) Johnny Schofield |
| 2 | (England) Stan Lynn |
| 3 | (Wales) Colin Green |
| 4 | (Wales) Terry Hennessey |
| 5 | (England) Trevor Smith (c) |
| 6 | (England) Malcolm Beard |
| 7 | (England) Mike Hellawell |
| 8 | (England) Jimmy Bloomfield |
| 9 | (England) Jimmy Harris |
| 10 | (Wales) Ken Leek |
| 11 | (Scotland) Bertie Auld |
Manager:
(England) Gil Merrick

| 1 | (England) Nigel Sims |
| 2 | (Scotland) Cammie Fraser |
| 3 | (Scotland) Charlie Aitken |
| 4 | (Wales) Vic Crowe (c) |
| 5 | (England) John Sleeuwenhoek |
| 6 | (England) Gordon Lee |
| 7 | (England) Alan Baker |
| 8 | (Scotland) George Graham |
| 9 | (Scotland) Bobby Thomson |
| 10 | (Scotland) Ron Wylie |
| 11 | (England) Harry Burrows |
Manager:
(England) Joe Mercer

=== Second leg ===
27 May 1963

| Aston Villa | 0–0 | Birmingham City |

Villa Park, Birmingham
Attendance: 37,921
Referee: A. W. Sparling

| 1 | (England) Nigel Sims |
| 2 | (Scotland) Cammie Fraser |
| 3 | (Scotland) Charlie Aitken |
| 4 | (Wales) Vic Crowe (c) |
| 5 | (England) Lew Chatterley |
| 6 | (England) Gordon Lee |
| 7 | (England) Alan Baker |
| 8 | (Scotland) George Graham |
| 9 | (Scotland) Bobby Thomson |
| 10 | (Scotland) Ron Wylie |
| 11 | (England) Harry Burrows |
Manager:
(England) Joe Mercer

| 1 | (England) Johnny Schofield |
| 2 | (England) Stan Lynn |
| 3 | (Wales) Colin Green |
| 4 | (Wales) Terry Hennessey |
| 5 | (England) Trevor Smith (c) |
| 6 | (England) Malcolm Beard |
| 7 | (England) Mike Hellawell |
| 8 | (England) Jimmy Bloomfield |
| 9 | (England) Jimmy Harris |
| 10 | (Wales) Ken Leek |
| 11 | (Scotland) Bertie Auld |
Manager:
(England) Gil Merrick

== Road to the final ==
=== Birmingham City ===
| Round 2 | Birmingham City | 6–0 | Doncaster Rovers |
| Round 3 | Barrow | 1–1 | Birmingham City |
| Round 3 replay | Birmingham City | 5–1 | Barrow |
| Round 4 | Birmingham City | 3–2 | Notts County |
| Round 5 | Birmingham City | 6–0 | Manchester City |
| Semi-final (1st leg) | Birmingham City | 3–2 | Bury |
| Semi-final (2nd leg) | Bury | 1–1 | Birmingham City |
| | (Birmingham City win 4–3 on aggregate) | | |

=== Aston Villa ===
| Round 2 | Aston Villa | 6–1 | Peterborough United |
| Round 3 | Aston Villa | 3–1 | Stoke City |
| Round 4 | Aston Villa | 6–2 | Preston North End |
| Round 5 | Aston Villa | 4–1 | Norwich City |
| Semi-final (1st leg) | Sunderland | 1–3 | Aston Villa |
| Semi-final (2nd leg) | Aston Villa | 0–0 | Sunderland |
| | (Aston Villa win 3–1 on aggregate) | | |
