= Len Beel =

English cricketer and footballer (1945–2023)

Personal information
- Full name: William John Leonard Beel
- Date of birth: 23 August 1945
- Place of birth: Leominster, England
- Date of death: 13 April 2023 (aged 77)
- Position: Goalkeeper

Youth career
- 1961–1963: Shrewsbury Town

Senior career*
Years	Team	Apps	(Gls)
1963–1965	Shrewsbury Town	3	(0)
1965	Birmingham City	1	(0)
1965–1967	Bath City		
1967	Shifnal Town		
1967–1968	Minehead		
1968–1970	Trowbridge Town		
- * Club domestic league appearances and goals

William John Leonard Beel (23 August 1945 – 13 April 2023) was an English professional footballer who played as a goalkeeper for Shrewsbury Town and Birmingham City in the Football League. He also appeared for Somerset County Cricket Club.

== Life and career ==
William John Leonard Beel was born on 23 August 1945 in Leominster, Herefordshire. He began his football career with Shrewsbury Town as an apprentice in 1961, and turned professional two years later. As a young goalkeeper, he was selected for England youth squads, but never took the field in an international match. He made his senior debut for Shrewsbury in the Football League Third Division on 20 May 1963, helping his side beat Coventry City 2–1 despite conceding the penalty from which the visitors scored; the winning goal was controversial, as Coventry claimed the ball had entered the goal via a hole in the side netting. The death of regular goalkeeper Paul Miller in a swimming accident just before the start of the new season left Beel as Shrewsbury's only full-time goalkeeper. They brought in Alan Boswell, whose dislocated shoulder a few weeks later gave Beel another taste of first-team football: away to Bristol Rovers in the League Cup, the inexperienced Beel was given little help by his defence as Shrewsbury lost 6–2. Away to Coventry a month later, he was reportedly responsible for only two of the eight goals that Shrewsbury conceded, and his third and final league appearance was in a 1–1 draw away to Brentford.

Beel joined Birmingham City in January 1965 as cover for Johnny Schofield, but played only once for the first team. With relegation from the First Division already confirmed, he turned out in the penultimate game of the 1964–65 season, at home to Blackburn Rovers, which finished as a 5–5 draw. Released soon afterwards, he spent two seasons as a regular with Southern League club Bath City.

He briefly took up rugby union, which he had played at school, appearing for Bath Spartans and Bath United in September and October 1967, before returning to football with Minehead and then joining Trowbridge Town in January 1968. His professional contract with Trowbridge was cancelled by mutual consent in October 1969, but he returned as an amateur to play in the outfield for their reserves.

Beel played cricket as a fast bowler for Worcestershire Second XI from 1964 to 1966. He made six appearances in the 1964 Second XI Championship as an 18-year-old, and was a regular in the side for the next two seasons. In June 1969, Beel made his only first-class appearance, making 1 not out and taking 0/18 from 2 overs for Somerset in a Sunday League match against Warwickshire at Edgbaston. He played in three Minor Counties matches for Wiltshire in 1970, and was a mainstay of the Bath-based Lansdown Cricket Club for many years.

Beel died on 13 April 2023 at the age of 77.

== Sources ==
- Matthews, Tony (1995). Birmingham City: A Complete Record. Derby: Breedon Books. ISBN 978-1-85983-010-9.
