= Brian Rushton =

English footballer

Personal information
- Full name: Brian William Eric Rushton
- Date of birth: 21 October 1943
- Place of birth: Sedgley, England
- Date of death: 29 October 2023 (aged 80)
- Position: Full back

Youth career
- 1959–1960: Birmingham City

Senior career*
Years	Team	Apps	(Gls)
1960–1967	Birmingham City	12	(0)
1967–1968	Notts County	3	(0)
–	Stourbridge		
- * Club domestic league appearances and goals

Brian William Eric Rushton (21 October 1943 – 29 October 2023) was an English professional footballer who played in the Football League for Birmingham City and Notts County. He played as a full back.

Rushton was born in Sedgley, Staffordshire. He captained the Brierley Hill schools representative side before joining Birmingham City as an amateur in 1959. He made his debut in the First Division on 30 March 1963, deputising for Stan Lynn in a home game against Sheffield Wednesday which resulted in a 1–1 draw; this was the first of a run of eleven games, nine in the league and both legs of the League Cup semi-final, which ended when Lynn regained fitness. He played three more first-team games before joining Fourth Division club Notts County in 1967, but after one season, in which he played only three games, Rushton dropped into non-league football with Stourbridge.

Rushton died on October 29, 2023, at the age of 80.
