= Peter Bullock (footballer) =

English footballer

Personal information
- Full name: Peter Leonard Bullock
- Date of birth: 17 November 1941 (age 84)
- Place of birth: Stoke-on-Trent, England
- Position: Inside forward

Youth career
- 1957–1958: Stoke City

Senior career*
Years	Team	Apps	(Gls)
1958–1962	Stoke City	44	(13)
1962–1965	Birmingham City	27	(3)
1965	Southend United	12	(2)
1965–1968	Colchester United	95	(33)
1968	Exeter City	14	(2)
1968	Stafford Rangers		
1968–1969	Walsall	7	(0)
Total		199	(53)
- * Club domestic league appearances and goals

Peter Leonard Bullock (born 17 November 1941) is an English former footballer who played as an inside forward. He scored 53 goals in 199 appearances in the Football League playing for Stoke City, Birmingham City, Southend United, Colchester United, Exeter City and Walsall.

== Career ==
Bullock was born in Stoke-on-Trent and began his career with Stoke City. He made his debut for Stoke in a 4–1 defeat away at Swansea Town on 19 April 1958 at the age of 16 years and 163 days becoming the club's youngest player, he also scored Stoke's goal thus becoming youngest goalscorer. He scored five goals in 13 appearances in 1958–59 but injury kept him out of the entire 1959–60 season. He returned to the side in 1960–61 under new manager Tony Waddington playing in 19 matches scoring five goals. He scored five goals again in 1961–62 and was sold to First Division Birmingham City for a fee of £10,000. He was never able to live up to his potential at Birmingham and after making 28 appearances in four years he left for Southend United.

Bullock did not stay long at Roots Hall quickly moving to local rivals Colchester United with whom he gained promotion from the Fourth Division in 1965–66. He scored 15 goals in 1966–67 as the "U's" finished in 13th position, but relegation was suffered in 1967–68 and Bullock joined Exeter City in August 1968. He spent just three months at Exeter before returning to Staffordshire and played for non-league Stafford Rangers. He made a short return to professional football playing seven matches for Walsall before retiring.

== Personal life ==
Bullock comes from a footballing family. His elder brother Brian was an amateur with West Bromwich Albion and Stoke City, and younger brother Mickey had a long playing career before going into management. His son Simon played for Halifax Town while Mickey Bullock was manager there.

== Career statistics ==
Club	Season	Division	League		FA Cup		League Cup		Total	
Club	Season	Division	Apps	Goals	Apps	Goals	Apps	Goals	Apps	Goals
Stoke City	1957–58	Second Division	3	1	0	0	–		3	1
Stoke City	1958–59	Second Division	13	5	0	0	–		13	5
Stoke City	1959–60	Second Division	0	0	0	0	–		0	0
Stoke City	1960–61	Second Division	17	5	0	0	0	0	17	5
Stoke City	1961–62	Second Division	11	2	2	1	2	2	15	5
Stoke City	Total		44	13	2	1	2	2	48	16
Birmingham City	1961–62	First Division	1	0	0	0	0	0	1	0
Birmingham City	1962–63	First Division	14	2	0	0	1	1	15	3
Birmingham City	1963–64	First Division	11	1	0	0	0	0	11	1
Birmingham City	1964–65	First Division	1	0	0	0	0	0	1	0
Birmingham City	Total		27	3	0	0	1	1	28	4
Southend United	1964–65	Third Division	8	2	0	0	0	0	8	2
Southend United	1965–66	Third Division	4	0	0	0	0	0	4	0
Southend United	Total		12	2	0	0	0	0	12	2
Colchester United	1965–66	Fourth Division	34	11	2	0	0	0	36	11
Colchester United	1966–67	Third Division	41	15	1	0	1	0	43	15
Colchester United	1967–68	Third Division	20	7	2	0	1	0	23	7
Colchester United	Total		95	33	3	0	2	0	100	33
Exeter City	1968–69	Fourth Division	14	2	0	0	5	1	19	3
Exeter City	Total		14	2	0	0	5	1	19	3
Walsall	1968–69	Third Division	7	0	0	0	0	0	7	0
Walsall	Total		7	0	0	0	0	0	7	0
Career Total			199	53	7	1	10	4	216	58
