= Mick Farmer =

English footballer

Personal information
- Full name: Michael Chester Farmer
- Date of birth: 22 November 1944 (age 81)
- Place of birth: Leicester, England
- Position: Wing half

Youth career
- 1961–1962: Birmingham City

Senior career*
Years	Team	Apps	(Gls)
1962–1965	Birmingham City	1	(1)
1965–1966	Lincoln City	22	(0)
1966–196?	Skegness Town		
–	Arnold		
–	Skegness Town		
1970–1974	Grantham Town		
1973–1974	→ Oadby Town (loan)		
- * Club domestic league appearances and goals

Michael Chester Farmer (born 22 November 1944) is an English former professional footballer who played in the Football League for Birmingham City and Lincoln City. He played as a wing half.

== Career ==
Farmer was born in Leicester. He began his football career as an apprentice with Birmingham City in 1961, and turned professional the following year. Described as a "tall, well-built midfielder with a powerful shot", Farmer scored on his debut in the First Division on 1 February 1964, deputising for Malcolm Beard in a 3–2 defeat at Ipswich Town. This proved to be his only first-team appearance for the club, and in the 1965 close season he joined Lincoln City. Farmer spent only one season with Lincoln, playing 22 games, all in the Fourth Division, before moving into non-league football with Skegness Town and Arnold.

Prior to the 1970–71 season he signed for Grantham, then playing in the Midland League. By the time his Grantham career ended some four and a half years and 143 games later, he had won two Midland League titles, a Southern League Division One North title and contributed to the club's Southern League runners-up spot in 1974, though in 1973–74 season he spent time on loan at Oadby Town and took no part in Grantham's run to the Third Round of the FA Cup.

After leaving professional football he worked in finance.
