= Alan Baker (footballer) =

English footballer (1944–2026)

Personal information
- Date of birth: 22 June 1944
- Place of birth: Tipton, Staffordshire, England
- Date of death: 1 January 2026 (aged 81)
- Position: Forward

Youth career
- –1958: Brierley Hill Schoolboys
- 1958–1961: Aston Villa

Senior career*
Years	Team	Apps	(Gls)
1961–1966	Aston Villa	92	(13)
1966–1970	Walsall		

International career
1959	England Schoolboys	5	(2)

Managerial career
- Walsall Youth (coach)
- * Club domestic league appearances and goals

Alan "Bilko" Baker (or Allan Baker; 22 June 1944 – 1 January 2026) was an English footballer who played as a forward for Walsall and Aston Villa.

== Club career ==
Baker was born in Tipton, Staffordshire. He joined Aston Villa as a schoolboy from Brierley Hill Schoolboys in 1958. He went on to debut for the club on 8 April 1961 during a 1–1 draw against Fulham, and he made 109 appearances (92 League, 17 Cup) for the club, scoring 17 goals. His last appearance for Aston Villa was a 6–1 loss against Manchester United on 6 May 1966.

Baker joined Walsall in 1967 and he suffered a knee injury on 12 September 1970 during a 2–0 victory against Tranmere Rovers in which he also scored. He retired at the age of 27 as a result of the injury.

== International career ==
As part of the "Class of 1959", Baker made five appearances for England Schoolboys during 1959, debuting during the 1–1 draw against Wales on 11 April 1959. His first goal came during the 3–1 victory against Northern Ireland on 17 April 1959, and his second goal came during the 2–0 victory against West Germany on 25 April 1959 where he scored the second goal.

== Personal life and death ==
His brother Peter Bunch also represented England Schoolboys four times in 1955.

Baker died on 1 January 2026, at the age of 81.

== Honours ==
Aston Villa

- Football League Cup runner-up: 1962–63
