= Trevor Smith (footballer, born 1936) =

English footballer (1936–2003)

Personal information
- Date of birth: 13 April 1936
- Place of birth: Brierley Hill, England
- Date of death: 9 August 2003 (aged 67)
- Place of death: Essex, England
- Position: Centre-half

Youth career
- 1951–1953: Birmingham City

Senior career*
Years	Team	Apps	(Gls)
1953–1964	Birmingham City	365	(3)
1964–1966	Walsall	12	(0)
Total		377	(3)

International career
1955–1959	England U23	15	(0)
1955–1957	England B	2	(0)
1959	England	2	(0)
- * Club domestic league appearances and goals

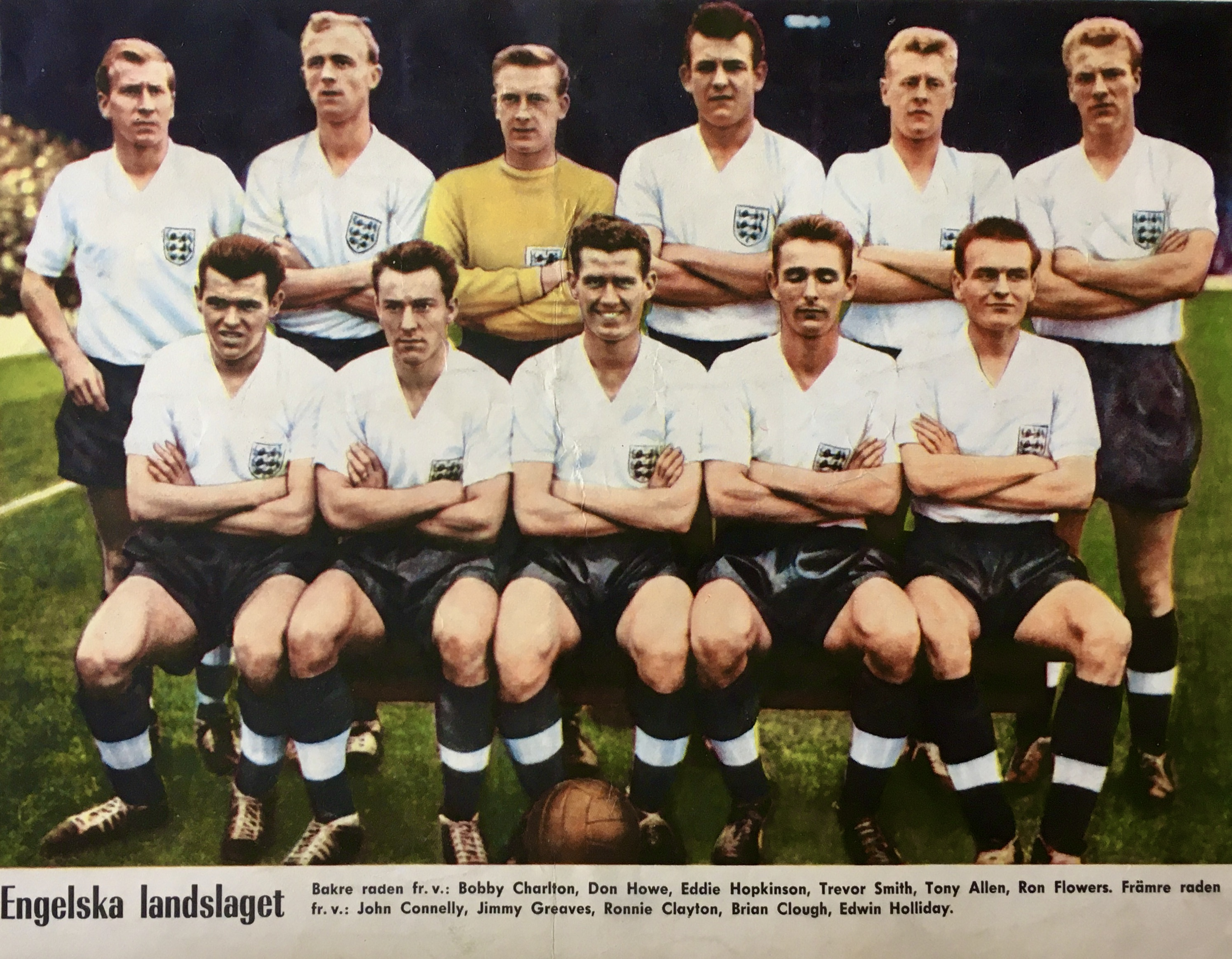
England national football team at Empire Stadium, London 28 October 1959. From left, standing: Bobby Charlton, Don Howe, Eddie Hopkinson, Trevor Smith, Tony Allen, Ron Flowers; front row: John Connelly, Jimmy Greaves, Ronnie Clayton, Brian Clough and Edwin Holliday.

Trevor Smith (13 April 1936 – 9 August 2003) was an English footballer who played as a centre-half for Birmingham City, Walsall and the England national team.

== Life and career ==
Smith was born in Brierley Hill, Staffordshire, and attended Quarry Bank secondary modern school. In 1951 he captained the local schools' representative side, Brierley Hill, Sedgley and District, to their first final of the English Schools' F.A. Trophy, in which they lost to Liverpool Schools 5–3 on aggregate. A feature of the first leg, according to the Brierley Hill local newspaper, was the "solid play of the two centre-halves, Parkes for Liverpool and Smith for the home team", while the match programme from the second leg described him thus:

In Trevor Smith, a tall and weighty boy (nearly twelve stones) who captains the side and plays at centre half, Brierley Hill have a sheet anchor. Few centre forwards have been happy against him this season and, in addition to his stopper role, he finds time to distribute the ball effectively to his forwards.

When he left school he signed for Birmingham City as an amateur, and played for the team that won the European Youth Cup (later renamed Blue Stars/FIFA Youth Cup) the following year. He turned professional on reaching his 17th birthday in April 1953, and made his first-team debut for Birmingham, then in the Second Division, six months later, scoring an own goal in a 4–2 win at Derby County. Apart from interruptions due to injury or National Service obligations, he was a regular choice for the first team from then on.

Smith's career at Birmingham coincided with probably the best period in the club's history. Under the management of Arthur Turner, they won promotion to the First Division in 1954–55, reached the FA Cup Final and achieved their highest ever finishing position (sixth place) the following season, and then the FA Cup semifinal in 1957, only to lose to Manchester United's "Busby Babes". They went on to play on the losing side in two successive Inter-Cities Fairs Cup finals, under Smith's captaincy. The club's success during this period was built on a solid defence, comprising a first-choice selection of international players Gil Merrick, Jeff Hall, Ken Green and Smith himself, together with wing-halves Len Boyd and hard-man Roy Warhurst.

Smith represented his country at schoolboy and youth levels, and won no fewer than 15 caps at under-23 level. He was selected to represent England B against their West German counterparts when still only 18. He had all the attributes necessary for a top-class centre-half. Tall and powerfully built, he was good in the air and in the tackle and read the game well, combining an uncompromising physical game with good technique.

When the great Billy Wright retired from international football, the 23-year-old Smith was chosen to take his place, making his England debut against Wales at Ninian Park on 17 October 1959. A calf injury sustained early on which hampered his movement meant he failed to do himself justice, but he kept his place for the next match, against Sweden later that month. England performed poorly overall against the Swedes, Smith and his defence failed to cope with Swedish forward Agne Simonsson, and he was not chosen for his country again; Brian Clough's England career was also restricted to these same two games.

By the early 1960s, Birmingham were past their best. The Cup Final team had dispersed, league form was poor, but the new League Cup competition provided some relief. In 1963 they reached the final against local rivals Aston Villa, who were hot favourites having won the league meeting two months earlier by four clear goals. However, under the captaincy of the inspirational Smith, Birmingham won the home leg by a comfortable 3–1 margin, and a goalless draw in the away leg gave them their first major trophy.

At the start of the 1964–65 season, Smith lost his place through injury, and when he recovered he moved to Walsall of the Third Division for a fee of £18,000. He was able to make only 13 appearances for the club before arthritis forced his retirement in 1966 at the age of 29. Walsall were critical of Birmingham, believing they had knowingly sold them an unfit player.

After leaving the game Smith went into the licensed trade, first with a pub in Tamworth, then as manager of off-licences in Birmingham and later in Dagenham. He retired to Walton-on-the-Naze in Essex and died 18 months later of lung cancer on 9 August 2003 at the age of 67.

== Career statistics ==
Appearances and goals by club, season and competition
Club	Season	League			FA Cup		League Cup		Other		Total	
Club	Season	Division	Apps	Goals	Apps	Goals	Apps	Goals	Apps	Goals	Apps	Goals
Birmingham City
Birmingham City	1953–54	Second Division	24	0	1	0	—		—		25	0
Birmingham City	1954–55	Second Division	24	0	4	0	—		—		28	0
Birmingham City	1955–56	First Division	30	0	6	0	—		0	0	36	0
Birmingham City	1956–57	First Division	37	0	7	0	—		1 (Note: Appearance(s) in Inter-Cities Fairs Cup)	0	45	0
Birmingham City	1957–58	First Division	37	0	1	0	—		3	0	41	0
Birmingham City	1958–59	First Division	27	0	6	0	—		2	0	35	0
Birmingham City	1959–60	First Division	41	1	1	0	—		4	0	46	1
Birmingham City	1960–61	First Division	31	0	4	0	2	0	5	0	42	0
Birmingham City	1961–62	First Division	39	0	2	0	2	0	3	0	46	0
Birmingham City	1962–63	First Division	37	0	2	0	7	0	—		46	0
Birmingham City	1963–64	First Division	34	2	1	0	1	0	—		36	2
Birmingham City	1964–65	First Division	4	0	—		0	0	—		4	0
Birmingham City	Total		365	3	35	0	12	0	18	0	430	3
Walsall	1964–65	Third Division	11	0	1	0	—		—		12	0
Walsall	1965–66	Third Division	1	0	0	0	0	0	—		1	0
Walsall	Total		12	0	1	0	0	0	—		13	0
Career total			377	3	36	0	12	0	18	0	443	3

== Honours ==
Birmingham City Youth

- European Youth Cup: 1952

Birmingham City

- Football League Second Division: 1954–55
- Football League Cup: 1962–63
- FA Cup runner-up: 1955–56
- Inter-Cities Fairs Cup runner-up: 1958–60, 1960–61

== Sources ==
- Matthews, Tony (1995). Birmingham City: A Complete Record. Derby: Breedon Books. ISBN 978-1-85983-010-9.
- Matthews, Tony (2010). Birmingham City: The Complete Record. Derby: Derby Books. ISBN 978-1-85983-853-2.
