= Cammie Fraser =

Scottish footballer

Personal information
- Full name: John Cameron Fraser
- Date of birth: 24 May 1941 (age 85)
- Place of birth: Blackford, Scotland
- Position: Full back

Youth career
- Gairdoch United

Senior career*
Years	Team	Apps	(Gls)
1958–1962	Dunfermline Athletic	80	(0)
1962–1965	Aston Villa	33	(1)
1965–1966	Birmingham City	39	(0)
1967–1968	Falkirk	0	(0)

International career
1961–1962	Scotland under-23	2	(0)
- * Club domestic league appearances and goals

John Cameron Fraser (born 24 May 1941) is a Scottish former professional footballer who played as a full back. He played 80 games for Dunfermline Athletic in the Scottish Football League and a further 72 for Aston Villa and Birmingham City in the English Football League.

== Playing career ==
Fraser, born in Blackford, Perth and Kinross, began his football career as a youngster with Gairdoch United before joining Dunfermline Athletic in 1958 at the age of 17. Under Jock Stein's management at Dunfermline, he was a Scottish Cup-winner in 1961, defeating Celtic 2–0 in the replay after the original tie had finished goalless. Fraser, then 19, was the youngest player in the squad. This victory meant that Dunfermline qualified for the European Cup Winners' Cup. Fraser played in the club's run to the quarter-final, in which they lost to Újpesti Dózsa 5–3 on aggregate, though he missed the first leg of the quarter-final due to influenza apparently brought on by a vaccination. He was twice capped for Scotland at under-23 level during his time with Dunfermline.

In October 1962, Fraser joined English First Division club Aston Villa for a fee of £24,000, which paid for Dunfermline's new main stand. He played 40 games for Aston Villa in all competitions, and was on the losing side in the 1963 Football League Cup final against Birmingham City. Following a contractual dispute with the club he quit, joining his wife's hairdressing business in London, before returning to football in February 1965 with Birmingham City, who paid Villa a £9,000 fee for his services.

Fraser made a few appearances in attack for Birmingham, relegated to the Second Division at the end of the 1964–65 season, and played regularly at right-back the following season. He then returned to Scotland to join Falkirk, though never played for the first team.

== Personal life ==
In 2007, Fraser was reported as spending much of his time in Australia and the Far East. His father William played professional football for Aldershot and Northampton Town.

== Honours ==
Dunfermline Athletic

- Scottish Cup: 1960–61

Aston Villa

- Football League Cup runner-up: 1962–63
