= Joe Mallett =

English footballer and manager (1916–2004)

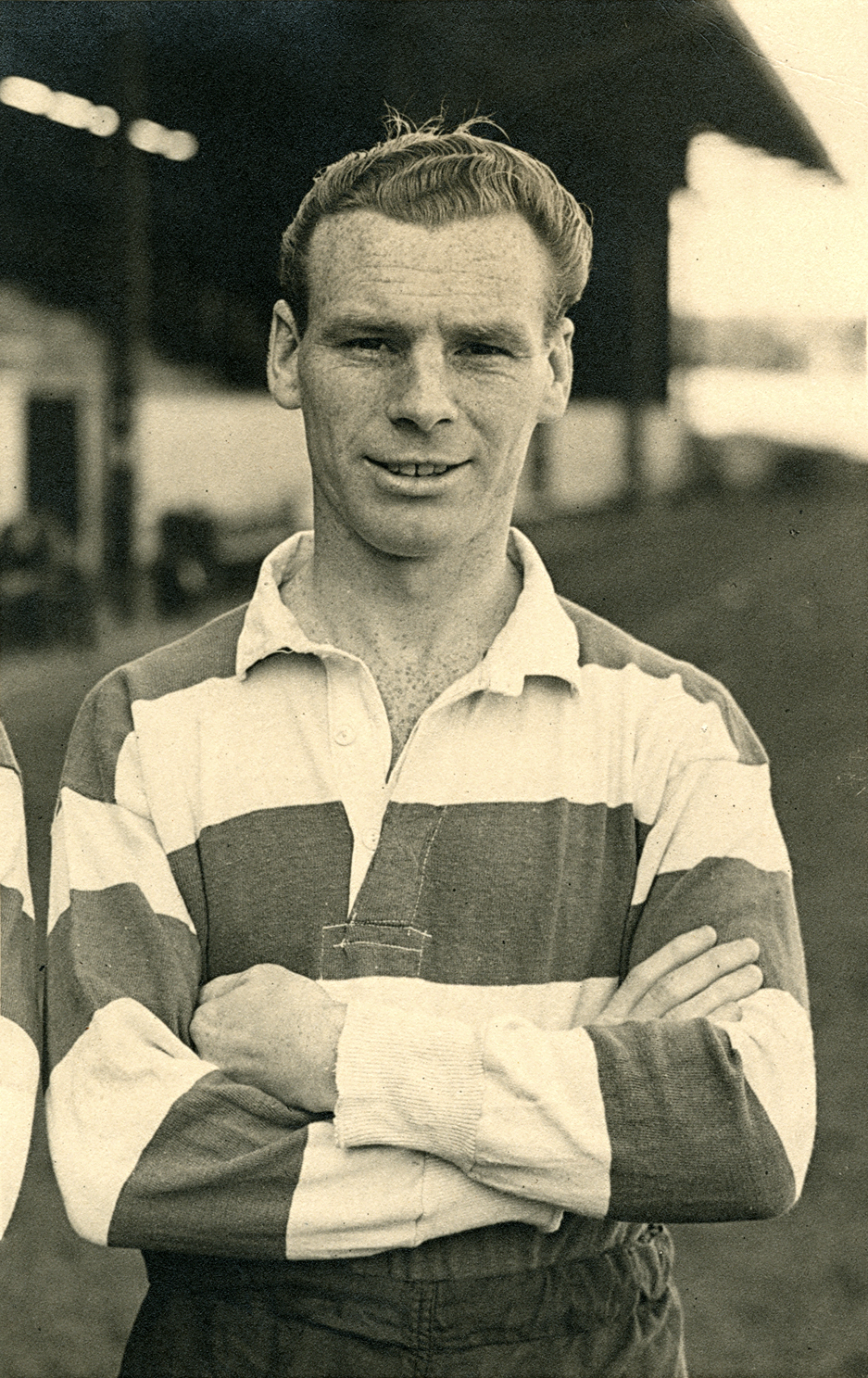

Personal information
- Full name: Joseph Mallett
- Date of birth: 8 January 1916
- Place of birth: Gateshead, England
- Date of death: 8 February 2004 (aged 88)
- Place of death: Hastings, England
- Height: 5 ft 7 in (1.70 m)
- Position: Wing half

Youth career
- Dunston Colliery

Senior career*
| Years | Team | Apps | (Gls) |
| 1935–1939 | Charlton Athletic | 2 | (0) |
| 1937–1938 | → Queens Park Rangers (loan) | 29 | (4) |
| 1939–1947 | Queens Park Rangers | 41 | (7) |
| 1947–1953 | Southampton | 215 | (3) |
| 1953–1955 | Leyton Orient | 27 | (1) |

Managerial career
- 1964–1965: Birmingham City
- 1970–1973: Panionios
- 1973–1974: Apollon Athens
- 1974–1975: Panionios
- 1982: San Jose Earthquakes
- * Club domestic league appearances and goals

Joseph Mallett (8 January 1916 – 8 February 2004), was an English professional footballer. He spent much of his early playing career at Queens Park Rangers, and subsequently at Southampton (playing as a wing half). He later became a coach, manager and scout.

== Playing career ==
Born in Gateshead, Mallett was spotted playing for the Dunston Colliery works team by a London scout. He was signed at the age of seventeen by Charlton Athletic, to serve his apprenticeship under manager Jimmy Seed. He had not made any first team appearances before Charlton (then in the First Division) loaned him to Third Division South team Queens Park Rangers, to gain experience in April 1937. He remained at QPR until May 1938, making 31 appearances before returning to Charlton, where he appeared twice in the 1938–39 season. In February 1939, Rangers persuaded Charlton to sell him; he was becoming a first-team regular at QPR before his career was interrupted by conscription into the RAF in World War II. During the war, he guested for Fulham and West Ham, returning to QPR after the cessation of hostilities.

In February 1947 Bill Dodgin signed him for Southampton for a club record £5000. Although now aged 31, Mallett proved to be a bargain purchase – he was "a strong link between the defence and attack, and was particularly sound in his positional play." He made his debut away to Plymouth Argyle on 1 March 1947, scoring one of Saints' goals and making the other in a 3–2 defeat. He soon became the team's captain and had "forthright views on how the game should be played". Teammate Alf Ramsey described him as "having one of the finest of all soccer brains".

When Dodgin left the Saints in August 1949 to be replaced by Sid Cann, Mallett became restless and in January 1950, he put in a transfer request in the hope of receiving a coaching position. The board persuaded him to stay and he remained loyal to Southampton, playing regularly until his last game, away to Nottingham Forest on 29 April 1953. During his Southampton career he made 223 appearances, scoring three goals.

== Coaching career ==
In July 1953, now aged 37, he moved on to Leyton Orient as player-coach, where he was re-united with former QPR teammate Alec Stock. In 1959, he was reserve team coach at Nottingham Forest under Billy Walker and then Andy Beattie, where he brought on a succession of young players, including Ian Storey-Moore and David Pleat.

In June 1964 he joined Birmingham City as coach, and a month later accepted the vacant managerial position. Although he was a proven technical coach with sound judgment of a player – he signed Geoff Vowden and Ron Wylie and gave Malcolm Page his debut – under his management Birmingham won only 13 out of 64 matches and were relegated from the First Division. He remained at the club as assistant manager under Stan Cullis from December 1965 to 1970.

When Cullis retired, Mallett went on to manage Panionios and coach at Apollon Smyrnis in the Greek Super League. Under his management, Panionios achieved their highest finishing position in Greek football (2nd in 1970-71) and won the 1971 Balkans Cup. From 1975 Mallett coached under Gordon Bradley at New York Cosmos in the NASL where he worked with players such as Pelé, Johan Cruyff and Franz Beckenbauer, rejoining Bradley at the Washington Diplomats in 1978, and later coached at San Jose Earthquakes. He also scouted for former club Southampton.

== Personal life ==
He was married to Bertha, whom he first met whilst at Charlton Athletic. They had three sons, Alan, Brian and Francis, and one daughter Julia. Mallett died at his home in Hastings on 8 February 2004 with his family around him.
