= Bobby Thomson (footballer, born 1937) =

Scottish footballer (1937–2024)

Personal information
- Full name: Robert Gillies McKenzie Thomson
- Date of birth: 21 March 1937
- Place of birth: Dundee, Scotland
- Date of death: 6 August 2024 (aged 87)
- Position: Forward

Youth career
- Albion Rovers
- 1952–1953: Airdrieonians
- 1953–1954: Wolverhampton Wanderers

Senior career*
Years	Team	Apps	(Gls)
1954–1959	Wolverhampton Wanderers	1	(1)
1959–1963	Aston Villa	140	(70)
1963–1967	Birmingham City	114	(23)
1967–1968	Stockport County	17	(0)
1968–1970	Bromsgrove Rovers		
Total		272	(80)
- * Club domestic league appearances and goals

Robert Gillies McKenzie Thomson (21 March 1937 – 6 August 2024) was a Scottish professional footballer who played as a forward. He played most of his professional career in the West Midlands, making over 300 appearances in total for the two Birmingham clubs, and is probably best known for his four years at Aston Villa.

== Career ==
Thomson was born in Dundee, Scotland. He began his football career as an amateur first with Albion Rovers and then Airdrieonians. Following successful trials he moved to First Division champions Wolverhampton Wanderers in 1953 and signed professional forms in 1954. During Thomson's five years at the club, Wolves won the League twice more and never finished below sixth. However, he was unable to establish himself as a first-team player and managed just one League first-team appearance, scoring in a 2–0 win over Newcastle United on 13 April 1957.

He transferred to Aston Villa, newly relegated to the Second Division, in 1959 for a fee of £8,000. Here, he made an immediate impact, scoring 22 goals in his first season, which made him the club's top scorer and helped them win the 1959–60 Second Division championship. He followed this up with 18 goals the next season and another 18 in 1962–63. He played in the final of the inaugural League Cup competition in 1960–61 in which Aston Villa beat Rotherham United. Two years later he scored in the first leg of the 1963 League Cup final against Birmingham City, but in the second leg he was marked out of the game by former England centre-half Trevor Smith, a significant factor in Birmingham retaining their 3–1 lead.

In September 1963 Thomson moved to Birmingham City. In his first season, he was used in a variety of positions, eventually settling in at centre-forward alongside the newly arrived and prolific Geoff Vowden. Their goals failed to prevent relegation to the Second Division in 1964–65. In his last full season he played successfully at right half in place of captain Ron Wylie who had broken his leg. Wylie's return to fitness and the arrival of former England centre-forward Fred Pickering left no place for Thomson, so in December 1967 he moved to Third Division Stockport County, and then into Non-League football with Bromsgrove Rovers.

== Death ==
Thomson died 6 August 2024, at the age of 87.

== Honours ==
Aston Villa

- Football League Second Division: 1959–60
- Football League Cup: 1960–61; runner-up: 1962–63
