= Alec Jackson (footballer, born 1937) =

English footballer (1937–2023)

Personal information
- Full name: Alec Jackson
- Date of birth: 29 May 1937
- Place of birth: Tipton, England
- Date of death: 10 August 2023 (aged 86)
- Positions: Winger; inside forward

Senior career*
Years	Team	Apps	(Gls)
- St John's (Tipton)
- WG Allen's
1954–1964	West Bromwich Albion	192	(50)
1964–1967	Birmingham City	78	(11)
1967–1968	Walsall	38	(7)
1968–1970	Nuneaton Borough		
1970–1971	Kidderminster Harriers		
1971–1972	Warley		
- Oldbury Town
- Warley County Borough
1972–1974	Darlaston		
1974–1975	Blakenall		
1976–197?	Lower Gornal		
1978–19??	Rushall Olympic		
- Bush Rangers

International career
1962	The Football League XI	1	(1)
- * Club domestic league appearances and goals

Alec Jackson (29 May 1937 – 10 August 2023) was an English footballer who played as a winger or inside forward. He made more than 300 appearances in the Football League playing for West Bromwich Albion, Birmingham City and Walsall, and appeared for the Football League representative side.

== Life and career ==
Alec Jackson was born on 29 May 1937 in Tipton, Staffordshire. He joined West Bromwich Albion as an amateur in May 1954 and turned professional in September of the same year. He became the youngest player to score a league goal for the club when he scored on his debut against Charlton Athletic in November 1954. He spent another decade at Albion, a First Division club; the season before Jackson made his debut, they had won the FA Cup and finished as League runners-up, but they won no more trophies during his time with the club. In March 1962, Jackson was a late replacement for the injured John Connelly in the Football League XI to face the Scottish League XI; according to the Daily Mirror's match report, he had "a tough time in his first representative match, continually running into trouble" as his side lost 4–3, and he was not selected again. He scored 52 goals in 208 appearances for Albion before moving to Birmingham City in 1964 for a fee of £12,500.

Jackson was a regular member of the Birmingham team that suffered relegation from the First Division in 1965, and stayed at the club for a further 18 months. After playing little during the 1966–67 season, he submitted a transfer request which was accepted, and signed for Third Division club Walsall in February 1967. At the end of the 1967–68 season, with the Walsall club needing to cut costs, he was allowed to leave on a free transfer.

He went on to spend another decade in non-league football, playing for Nuneaton Borough, Kidderminster Harriers, Warley, Oldbury Town, Warley County Borough, Darlaston, Blakenall, Lower Gornal (as player-coach), Rushall Olympic, and Bush Rangers.

After his professional football career was over, Jackson went on to work on the track, making cars at the Austin works in Longbridge, Birmingham.

Jackson died on 10 August 2023 at the age of 86.

== Sources ==
- Matthews, Tony (1995). Birmingham City: A Complete Record. Derby: Breedon Books. ISBN 1-85983-010-2.
- Matthews, Tony (2005). The Who's Who of West Bromwich Albion. Derby: Breedon Books. ISBN 1-85983-474-4.
