= Stan Lynn =

English footballer

Personal information
- Full name: Stanley Lynn
- Date of birth: 18 June 1928
- Place of birth: Bolton, England
- Date of death: 29 April 2002 (aged 73)
- Place of death: Birmingham, England
- Position: Right back

Youth career
- 1944–1945: Whitworth's
- 1945–1947: Accrington Stanley

Senior career*
| Years | Team | Apps | (Gls) |
| 1947–1950 | Accrington Stanley | 35 | (2) |
| 1950–1961 | Aston Villa | 281 | (36) |
| 1961–1966 | Birmingham City | 131 | (26) |
| 1966–1968 | Stourbridge | | |
| Total | | 447 | (64) |
- * Club domestic league appearances and goals

Stanley Lynn (18 June 1928 – 29 April 2002) was an English professional footballer who played as a right back. He made nearly 450 appearances in the Football League for Accrington Stanley, Aston Villa and Birmingham City. Nicknamed "Stan the Wham", he was renowned for his powerful right-footed shots which came from his "Booming Boots".

Born in Bolton, Lancashire, Lynn was a tough-tackling right-back who started his career at Accrington Stanley in July 1947. He played only 35 league games for the club before Aston Villa stepped in with a £10,000 bid in March 1950.

He established himself in the Villa team in 1954, and was a regular fixture in the side until 1960. He helped Villa win their seventh FA Cup in 1957, the Second Division championship in 1960, and the 1961 League Cup. Playing against Sunderland in January 1958, Lynn became the first full-back to score a hat-trick in a top-flight match.

He transferred to Villa's arch-rivals Birmingham City in October 1961, by which time he had lost much of his pace. He went on to play nearly 150 games for the club, helping them to their first major trophy, the 1963 League Cup, defeating former club Aston Villa in the final, and in the 1964–65 season finished as Birmingham's joint leading scorer.

Lynn joined Stourbridge for a couple of seasons before retiring in 1968. He still made appearances for Aston Villa All Stars, a charity fundraising team of former players, until 1985. He worked in the toolroom stores at Lucas in Birmingham until his retirement. He was twice married and had two children. In later life he suffered from Alzheimer's disease, and died in a Birmingham nursing home in 2002 at the age of 73.

== Honours ==
Aston Villa

- Football League Second Division: 1959–60
- FA Cup: 1956–57
- Football League Cup: 1960–61

Birmingham City

- Football League Cup: 1962–63
