= 1963–64 Football League First Division =

1963–64 season of Football League First Division

Football League First Division
- Season: 1963–64
- Champions: Liverpool; 6th English title
- Relegated: Bolton Wanderers; Ipswich Town
- European Cup: Liverpool
- European Cup Winners' Cup: West Ham United
- Inter-Cities Fairs Cup: Manchester United; Everton
- Matches: 462
- Goals: 1,571 (3.4 per match)
- Top goalscorer: Jimmy Greaves (35 goals)
- Biggest home win: Fulham 10–1 Ipswich Town (26 December 1963)
- Biggest away win: West Ham United 2–8 Blackburn Rovers (26 December 1963)
- Highest scoring: Fulham 10–1 Ipswich Town (26 December 1963)

Statistics of Football League First Division in the 1963–64 season.

== Overview ==
Liverpool won the First Division title for the sixth time in the club's history that season, and for the first time since 1947. On Boxing Day, 66 goals were scored in the division from 10 games, including Ipswich Town's record 10–1 defeat to Fulham. It was the first double digit scoreline in the division since 1958–59. Other results that day included Liverpool beating Stoke City 6–1, Burnley beating Manchester United by the same scoreline, Blackburn Rovers beating West Ham United 8–2 away and a 4–4 draw between West Bromwich Albion and Tottenham Hotspur.

== League standings ==
| Pos | Team | Pld | W | D | L | GF | GA | GAv | Pts | Qualification or relegation |
|---|---|---|---|---|---|---|---|---|---|---|
| 1 | Liverpool (C) | 42 | 26 | 5 | 11 | 92 | 45 | 2.044 | 57 | Qualification for the European Cup preliminary round |
| 2 | Manchester United | 42 | 23 | 7 | 12 | 90 | 62 | 1.452 | 53 | Qualification for the Inter-Cities Fairs Cup first round |
| 3 | Everton | 42 | 21 | 10 | 11 | 84 | 64 | 1.313 | 52 | Qualification for the Inter-Cities Fairs Cup first round |
| 4 | Tottenham Hotspur | 42 | 22 | 7 | 13 | 97 | 81 | 1.198 | 51 | |
| 5 | Chelsea | 42 | 20 | 10 | 12 | 72 | 56 | 1.286 | 50 | |
| 6 | Sheffield Wednesday | 42 | 19 | 11 | 12 | 84 | 67 | 1.254 | 49 | |
| 7 | Blackburn Rovers | 42 | 18 | 10 | 14 | 89 | 65 | 1.369 | 46 | |
| 8 | Arsenal | 42 | 17 | 11 | 14 | 90 | 82 | 1.098 | 45 | |
| 9 | Burnley | 42 | 17 | 10 | 15 | 71 | 64 | 1.109 | 44 | |
| 10 | West Bromwich Albion | 42 | 16 | 11 | 15 | 70 | 61 | 1.148 | 43 | |
| 11 | Leicester City | 42 | 16 | 11 | 15 | 61 | 58 | 1.052 | 43 | |
| 12 | Sheffield United | 42 | 16 | 11 | 15 | 61 | 64 | 0.953 | 43 | |
| 13 | Nottingham Forest | 42 | 16 | 9 | 17 | 64 | 68 | 0.941 | 41 | |
| 14 | West Ham United | 42 | 14 | 12 | 16 | 69 | 74 | 0.932 | 40 | Qualification for the European Cup Winners' Cup first round (Note: West Ham United qualified for the European Cup Winners' Cup as the 1963–64 FA Cup winners.) |
| 15 | Fulham | 42 | 13 | 13 | 16 | 58 | 65 | 0.892 | 39 | |
| 16 | Wolverhampton Wanderers | 42 | 12 | 15 | 15 | 70 | 80 | 0.875 | 39 | |
| 17 | Stoke City | 42 | 14 | 10 | 18 | 77 | 78 | 0.987 | 38 | |
| 18 | Blackpool | 42 | 13 | 9 | 20 | 52 | 73 | 0.712 | 35 | |
| 19 | Aston Villa | 42 | 11 | 12 | 19 | 62 | 71 | 0.873 | 34 | |
| 20 | Birmingham City | 42 | 11 | 7 | 24 | 54 | 92 | 0.587 | 29 | |
| 21 | Bolton Wanderers (R) | 42 | 10 | 8 | 24 | 48 | 80 | 0.600 | 28 | Relegation to the Second Division |
| 22 | Ipswich Town (R) | 42 | 9 | 7 | 26 | 56 | 121 | 0.463 | 25 | Relegation to the Second Division |

Source: World Football
Rules for classification: 1) Points; 2) Goal average; 3) Goals scored
(C) Champions; (R) Relegated

== Results ==
| Home \ Away | ARS | AST | BIR | BLB | BLP | BOL | BUR | CHE | EVE | FUL | IPS | LEI | LIV | MUN | NOT | SHU | SHW | STK | TOT | WBA | WHU | WOL |
|---|---|---|---|---|---|---|---|---|---|---|---|---|---|---|---|---|---|---|---|---|---|---|
| Arsenal | | 3–0 | 4–1 | 0–0 | 5–3 | 4–3 | 3–2 | 2–4 | 6–0 | 2–2 | 6–0 | 0–1 | 1–1 | 2–1 | 4–2 | 1–3 | 1–1 | 1–1 | 4–4 | 3–2 | 3–3 | 1–3 |
| Aston Villa | 2–1 | | 0–3 | 1–2 | 3–1 | 3–0 | 2–0 | 2–0 | 0–1 | 2–2 | 0–0 | 1–3 | 2–2 | 4–0 | 3–0 | 0–1 | 2–2 | 1–3 | 2–4 | 1–0 | 2–2 | 2–2 |
| Birmingham City | 1–4 | 3–3 | | 2–2 | 3–2 | 2–1 | 0–0 | 3–4 | 0–2 | 0–0 | 1–0 | 2–0 | 3–1 | 1–1 | 3–3 | 3–0 | 1–2 | 0–1 | 1–2 | 0–1 | 2–1 | 2–2 |
| Blackburn Rovers | 4–1 | 2–0 | 3–0 | | 1–2 | 3–0 | 1–2 | 2–2 | 1–2 | 2–0 | 3–1 | 5–2 | 1–2 | 1–3 | 2–0 | 2–2 | 1–1 | 1–0 | 7–2 | 0–2 | 1–3 | 1–1 |
| Blackpool | 0–1 | 0–4 | 3–0 | 3–2 | | 2–0 | 1–1 | 1–5 | 1–1 | 1–0 | 2–2 | 3–3 | 0–1 | 1–0 | 1–0 | 2–2 | 2–2 | 1–0 | 0–2 | 1–0 | 0–1 | 1–2 |
| Bolton Wanderers | 1–1 | 1–1 | 0–2 | 0–5 | 1–1 | | 2–1 | 1–0 | 1–3 | 2–1 | 6–0 | 0–0 | 1–2 | 0–1 | 2–3 | 3–0 | 3–0 | 3–4 | 1–3 | 1–2 | 1–1 | 0–4 |
| Burnley | 0–3 | 2–0 | 2–1 | 3–0 | 1–0 | 1–1 | | 0–0 | 2–3 | 4–1 | 3–1 | 2–0 | 0–3 | 6–1 | 1–1 | 1–2 | 3–1 | 1–0 | 7–2 | 3–2 | 3–1 | 1–0 |
| Chelsea | 3–1 | 1–0 | 2–3 | 1–0 | 1–0 | 4–0 | 2–0 | | 1–0 | 1–2 | 4–0 | 1–0 | 1–3 | 1–1 | 1–0 | 3–2 | 1–2 | 3–3 | 0–3 | 3–1 | 0–0 | 2–3 |
| Everton | 2–1 | 4–2 | 3–0 | 2–4 | 3–1 | 2–0 | 3–4 | 1–1 | | 3–0 | 1–1 | 0–3 | 3–1 | 4–0 | 6–1 | 4–1 | 3–2 | 2–0 | 1–0 | 1–1 | 2–0 | 3–3 |
| Fulham | 1–4 | 2–0 | 2–1 | 1–1 | 1–1 | 3–1 | 2–1 | 0–1 | 2–2 | | 10–1 | 2–1 | 1–0 | 2–2 | 0–0 | 3–1 | 2–0 | 3–3 | 1–1 | 1–1 | 2–0 | 4–1 |
| Ipswich Town | 1–2 | 4–3 | 3–2 | 0–0 | 4–3 | 1–3 | 3–1 | 1–3 | 0–0 | 4–2 | | 1–1 | 1–2 | 2–7 | 4–3 | 1–0 | 1–4 | 0–2 | 2–3 | 1–2 | 3–2 | 1–0 |
| Leicester City | 7–2 | 0–0 | 3–0 | 4–3 | 2–3 | 1–0 | 0–0 | 2–4 | 2–0 | 0–1 | 2–1 | | 0–2 | 3–2 | 1–1 | 0–1 | 2–0 | 2–1 | 0–1 | 0–2 | 2–2 | 0–1 |
| Liverpool | 5–0 | 5–2 | 2–1 | 1–2 | 1–2 | 2–0 | 2–0 | 2–1 | 2–1 | 2–0 | 6–0 | 0–1 | | 3–0 | 1–2 | 6–1 | 3–1 | 6–1 | 3–1 | 1–0 | 1–2 | 6–0 |
| Manchester United | 3–1 | 1–0 | 1–2 | 2–2 | 3–0 | 5–0 | 5–1 | 1–1 | 5–1 | 3–0 | 2–0 | 3–1 | 0–1 | | 3–1 | 2–1 | 3–1 | 5–2 | 4–1 | 1–0 | 0–1 | 2–2 |
| Nottingham Forest | 2–0 | 0–1 | 4–0 | 1–1 | 0–1 | 3–1 | 1–3 | 0–1 | 2–2 | 2–0 | 3–1 | 2–0 | 0–0 | 1–2 | | 3–3 | 3–2 | 0–0 | 1–2 | 0–3 | 3–1 | 3–0 |
| Sheffield United | 2–2 | 1–1 | 3–0 | 0–1 | 1–0 | 0–1 | 2–0 | 1–1 | 0–0 | 1–0 | 3–1 | 0–1 | 3–0 | 1–2 | 1–2 | | 1–1 | 4–1 | 3–3 | 2–1 | 2–1 | 4–3 |
| Sheffield Wednesday | 0–4 | 1–0 | 2–1 | 5–2 | 1–0 | 3–0 | 3–1 | 3–2 | 0–3 | 3–0 | 3–1 | 1–2 | 2–2 | 3–3 | 3–1 | 3–0 | | 2–0 | 2–0 | 2–2 | 3–0 | 5–0 |
| Stoke City | 1–2 | 2–2 | 4–1 | 3–1 | 1–2 | 0–1 | 4–4 | 2–0 | 3–2 | 1–1 | 9–1 | 3–3 | 3–1 | 3–1 | 0–1 | 0–2 | 4–4 | | 2–1 | 1–1 | 3–0 | 0–2 |
| Tottenham Hotspur | 3–1 | 3–1 | 6–1 | 4–1 | 6–1 | 1–0 | 3–2 | 1–2 | 2–4 | 1–0 | 6–3 | 1–1 | 1–3 | 2–3 | 4–1 | 0–0 | 1–1 | 2–1 | | 0–2 | 3–0 | 4–3 |
| West Bromwich Albion | 4–0 | 4–3 | 3–1 | 1–3 | 2–1 | 1–1 | 0–0 | 1–1 | 4–2 | 3–0 | 2–1 | 1–1 | 2–2 | 1–4 | 2–3 | 2–0 | 1–3 | 2–3 | 4–4 | | 0–1 | 3–1 |
| West Ham United | 1–1 | 0–1 | 5–0 | 2–8 | 3–1 | 2–3 | 1–1 | 2–2 | 4–2 | 1–1 | 2–2 | 2–2 | 1–0 | 0–2 | 0–2 | 2–3 | 4–3 | 4–1 | 4–0 | 4–2 | | 1–1 |
| Wolverhampton Wanderers | 2–2 | 3–3 | 5–1 | 1–5 | 1–1 | 2–2 | 1–1 | 4–1 | 0–0 | 4–0 | 2–1 | 1–2 | 1–2 | 2–0 | 2–3 | 1–1 | 1–1 | 2–1 | 1–4 | 0–0 | 0–2 | |

Updated to match(es) played on unknown. Source: Ian Laschke: Rothmans Book of Football League Records 1888–89 to 1978–79. Macdonald and Jane’s, London & Sydney, 1980.
Legend: Blue = home team win; Yellow = draw; Red = away team win.

== Top scorers ==
| Rank | Player | Club | Goals |
|---|---|---|---|
| 1 | (England) Jimmy Greaves | Tottenham Hotspur | 35 |
| 2 | (England) Fred Pickering | Blackburn Rovers / Everton | 32 |
| = | (Republic of Ireland) Andy McEvoy | Blackburn Rovers | 32 |
| 4 | (England) Roger Hunt | Liverpool | 31 |
| 5 | (Scotland) Denis Law | Manchester United | 30 |
| 6 | (England) Ray Crawford | Ipswich Town / Wolverhampton Wanderers | 28 |
