= Terry Hennessey =

Welsh footballer (1942–2025)

Personal information
- Full name: William Terrence Hennessey
- Date of birth: 1 September 1942
- Place of birth: Llay, Wales
- Date of death: 8 August 2025 (aged 82)
- Position: Defender

Youth career
- 1958–1959: Birmingham City

Senior career*
Years	Team	Apps	(Gls)
1959–1965	Birmingham City	178	(3)
1965–1970	Nottingham Forest	159	(5)
1970–1973	Derby County	63	(4)
1973	Tamworth	0	(0)
Total		400	(12)

International career
1962–1972	Wales	39	(0)

Managerial career
- 1974–1978: Tamworth
- 1978: Tulsa Roughnecks
- 1978–1980: Shepshed Charterhouse
- 1980–1981: Tulsa Roughnecks (assistant coach)
- 1981–1983: Tulsa Roughnecks
- 1986–1987: Melbourne Croatia
- 1987–1988: SGK Heidelberg
- * Club domestic league appearances and goals

William Terrence Hennessey (1 September 1942 – 8 August 2025) was a Welsh professional football player and manager. He played as a defender and made 400 Football League appearances in the 1960s and 1970s with Birmingham City, Nottingham Forest and Derby County. He gained 39 caps for Wales national team.

After his playing career, Hennessey managed a number of clubs, including Tulsa Roughnecks of the North American Soccer League, whom he led to the league championship in 1983.

== Playing career ==
Hennessey joined Birmingham City as a junior, going on to make 178 League appearances for them, as well as being part of the team that won the 1962–63 Football League Cup.

In November 1965, he was transferred to Nottingham Forest and became their captain. He transferred from Forest to Derby County in February 1970 for a fee of £100,000. While at Derby he was part of the side that won the First Division in 1971–72. Hennessey's role on the field varied. During his career Hennessey accumulated a total of 400 league appearances, as well as being capped by Wales on 39 occasions.

== Coaching career ==
Hennessey was forced to retire at the end of the 1972–73 campaign and initially went into coaching. After taking a position (for the second time) as an assistant coach of Tulsa Roughnecks in 1980, he took over as manager mid-season in 1981, replacing Charlie Mitchell.

In 1983 Hennessey led Tulsa to the NASL championship, winning Soccer Bowl '83 by a 2–0 score over Toronto Blizzard. However, the team's financial instability led him to resign after the season.

== Personal life and death ==
Hennessey was the cousin of Wales goalkeeper Wayne Hennessey, who has over 100 caps for the national team.

Hennessey died on 8 August 2025, at the age of 82.

== Honours ==
Birmingham City

- Football League Cup: 1962–63
