= Alex Harley =

Scottish footballer

Personal information
- Full name: Alexander Harley
- Date of birth: 20 April 1936
- Place of birth: Glasgow, Scotland
- Date of death: 24 June 1969 (aged 33)
- Place of death: Birmingham, England
- Position: Striker

Senior career*
Years	Team	Apps	(Gls)
195?–1958	Maryhill		
1958–1962	Third Lanark	85	(68)
1962–1963	Manchester City	40	(23)
1963–1964	Birmingham City	28	(9)
1964–1965	Dundee	10	(4)
1965–1966	Portadown		
1966	Cape Town City	2	(0)
- * Club domestic league appearances and goals

Alexander Harley (20 April 1936 – 24 June 1969) was a Scottish professional footballer who played for Third Lanark, Manchester City, Birmingham City, Dundee, Portadown and Cape Town City as a striker.

Harley joined Third Lanark in 1958, and scored 71 goals in two seasons from 1960 to 1962, his 42 goals in the 1960–61 making him the highest scorer in the Scottish Football League First Division. In the 1962 close season Harley signed by English club Manchester City for £19,500. Harley debuted in a 2–0 defeat to Aston Villa on 25 August 1962, and scored his first Citizens goal two games later versus Tottenham Hotspur. Harley scored 31 more goals in all competitions that season, including the winner in a Manchester derby at Old Trafford, to become the club's leading scorer, but the Citizens finished the season in 21st place and were relegated.

Harley joined Birmingham City in the close season for £42,000, thereby staying in the top division. He scored 9 goals in 28 League appearances for the Blues and moved back to Scotland in 1965, signing for Dundee. Harley made just ten appearances for the Dee and scored four goals and was then transferred to Northern Irish club Portadown.

Harley died in Birmingham in 1969 at the age of 33 after heart failure from a coronary thrombosis.
