= Ken Leek =

Welsh footballer

Personal information
- Date of birth: 26 July 1935
- Place of birth: Ynysybwl, Wales
- Date of death: 19 November 2007 (aged 72)
- Place of death: Northampton, England
- Position: Forward

Senior career*
Years	Team	Apps	(Gls)
1952–1958	Northampton Town	71	(27)
1958–1961	Leicester City	93	(34)
1961	Newcastle United	13	(6)
1961	→ Montreal Concordia (loan)		
1961–1964	Birmingham City	104	(49)
1964–1965	Northampton Town	16	(4)
1965–1968	Bradford City	99	(25)
- Rhyl
- Merthyr Tydfil
- Ton Pentre
Total		396	(145)

International career
1958	Wales U23	1	(0)
1960–1965	Wales	13	(5)
- * Club domestic league appearances and goals

Kenneth Leek (26 July 1935 – 19 November 2007) was a Welsh footballer, who played as a centre forward or inside forward for several different clubs and for the Wales national team in a professional career which spanned from 1952 until 1968. He scored 145 goals in the Football League from 396 appearances with five clubs. Internationally he won 13 caps and scored five goals, and was a member of the Welsh squad for the 1958 FIFA World Cup in Sweden although he did not play during the tournament.

Leek started his career with Northampton Town aged 17 despite only playing football for three years. After six years, he earned a move to First Division Leicester City. He had three seasons at Leicester, and scored in every round of the FA Cup en route to the 1961 final. He was dropped from the final and soon moved on to Newcastle United. His stay with Newcastle was brief and he signed for Birmingham City before the end of the year, having had a loan spell in Canada with Montreal Concordia. He played more than 100 games with Birmingham, scoring nearly a goal every other game including two in the 1963 League Cup triumph against rivals Aston Villa. He returned to Northampton, helping them to promotion to the top flight before finishing his professional career with Bradford City. His career took him onto three Welsh non-league sides.

== Early life ==
Leek was born on 26 July 1935 in Ynysybwl, South Wales, where he lived next door to Birmingham City and future Welsh international footballer Don Dearson. He attended two rugby-playing schools before taking up football himself at the age of 14. He also spent two years in national service.

== Club career ==
As a teenager, Leek played football for Ynysybwl Boys attracting a number of club scouts. In August 1952, he signed for Third Division South side Northampton Town. He soon appeared for the first team and also won honours for the Welsh under-23 side. He scored for Northampton in their 1958 FA Cup triumph against First Division side Arsenal. In six years with Northampton, he had a strike-rate of one goal every three games, scoring 27 goals from 71 league games, and was also given a testimonial match.

He left Northampton in May 1958 to join First Division side Leicester City for a fee of £10,000 as an inside left or outside left. The same summer, he travelled with the Welsh national side to Sweden for the World Cup. He made his Leicester debut on 23 August against Everton, scoring once in a 2–0 victory. His goals ratio helped him to compete with Derek Hines for the centre forward position. He scored in every round of the 1960–61 FA Cup competition to help Leicester reach the final. However, after Leek's celebrations after the semi-final victory, manager Matt Gillies dropped his striker and replaced him with Hughie McIlmoyle for the final, which Leicester lost 2–0 to Tottenham Hotspur. He left Leicester just weeks later, having scored 43 goals in 108 appearances, with 34 of those coming in 93 league matches. In the summer of 1961 he played with Montreal Concordia in the International Soccer League, and National Soccer League.

He signed for Newcastle United for £25,000 for whom he scored a hat-trick on his debut in a friendly against Danish side Aarhus. However, his stay with Newcastle was only a short one and he was loaned to Canadian side Montreal Concordia before returning to the Midlands by the end of the year, with Birmingham City, costing £23,000. In three years with Birmingham, he scored 49 goals from 104 appearances in the league. He also scored two goals in the first leg of the club's League Cup victory against their local rivals Aston Villa in the 1963 final. Before Birmingham's appearance in the 2001 final, Leek said: "It was a very proud moment for me when we lifted the cup."

He returned to Northampton in 1964 at a cost of £10,000, and helped the Cobblers win promotion from the Second Division. The following season, he scored the winning goal in the club's first victory in the top division, against West Ham United.

In November 1965, Leek joined Bradford City for a club record fee of £10,000, becoming one of new chairman Stafford Heginbotham's first signings. He made his debut against Doncaster Rovers on 6 November 1965 and finished his first season as top scorer with 11 goals. He spent three seasons with City, also playing in midfield, scoring 25 goals from 99 league games, and adding a goal in the League Cup.

He left Bradford in June 1968 to return to Wales as a player-coach with non-league side Rhyl. He played for other Welsh sides Merthyr Tydfil and Ton Pentre before retiring in 1970.

== International career ==
Leek was a non-playing member of Wales's squad for the 1958 FIFA World Cup in Sweden. It took another two years for him to win his first international cap for Wales in a 2–0 victory against Scotland during the 1961 British Home Championship. He followed it up with games against the other home nations, England and Northern Ireland, among six caps that year. He won another three caps in 1962, and played for a second time against England in 1963. It was another two years before he was selected again, winning three more in 1965, the latter two being both in 1966 World Cup qualifying matches against Greece. His goals included two in the final minutes of a 1965 British Home Championship game against Scotland to give his country a 3–2 victory, which Leek said was his "favourite memory" of Cardiff.

== Playing style ==
Leek initially played as an inside or outside left forward but moved to centre forward early in his career. He was tall and said to be "effective in the air", had pace and was adept with both feet. He also suffered from injuries because of his robust style. Former Leicester teammate Gordon Banks said of Leek: "He was a terrific player – a great centre forward. He was very elusive and caused a lot of problems for centre halves."

== Personal life ==
Leek was married to Janet, with whom he had two daughters and four grandchildren. After his playing career, the family settled in Daventry, with Leek working for the Ford Motor Company before retiring in 1995. He died on 19 November 2007 at his home in Northampton after a short illness; he was 72. His grandson Karl Darlow became a professional footballer as a goalkeeper.

== Honours ==
Birmingham City

- Football League Cup: 1962–63

== Bibliography ==
- Dunk, Peter, ed. (1988), Panini's Football Yearbook 1988–89 (1st ed.), Panini Publishing Ltd, ISBN 1-871178-00-2
- Frost, Terry (1988), Bradford City A Complete Record 1903–1988, Breedon Books Sport, ISBN 0-907969-38-0
- Markham, David (2007), The legends of Bradford City, Breedon Books Sport, ISBN 978-1-85983-572-2
- Rollin, Glenda; Rollin, Jack, eds. (2008), Sky Sports Football Yearbook 2008–2009, Headline, ISBN 978-0-7553-1820-9,
