= Jim Herriot =

Scottish footballer (1939–2025)

Personal information
- Full name: James Herriot
- Date of birth: 20 December 1939
- Place of birth: Chapelhall, Scotland
- Date of death: 23 April 2025 (aged 85)
- Position: Goalkeeper

Senior career*
Years	Team	Apps	(Gls)
1957–1958	Douglasdale		
1958–1965	Dunfermline Athletic	94	(0)
1965–1971	Birmingham City	181	(0)
1970	→ Mansfield Town (loan)	5	(0)
1971	→ Aston Villa (loan)	0	(0)
1971	Durban City		
1971–1973	Hibernian	57	(0)
1973–1975	St Mirren	31	(0)
1975–1976	Partick Thistle	0	(0)
1975	→ Morton (loan)	1	(0)
1976	→ Dunfermline Athletic (loan)	0	(0)
1976–1977	Morton	3	(0)

International career
1962–1963	Scottish League XI	2	(0)
1968–1969	Scotland	8	(0)
- * Club domestic league appearances and goals

James Herriot (20 December 1939 – 23 April 2025) was a Scottish professional footballer who played as a goalkeeper for clubs in Scotland, England and South Africa. Herriot represented both Scotland and the Scottish League XI.

== Career ==
Herriot was an apprentice bricklayer playing part-time for Junior club Douglasdale before he joined Dunfermline Athletic in 1958. He became the Pars established number 1 when Eddie Connachan left for Middlesbrough in 1963. Herriot adopted the American Football technique of applying boot polish under and around his eyes to reduce the effects of glare from the sun. Herriot helped Dunfermline reach the 1965 Scottish Cup Final, which they lost 3–2 to Celtic.

Herriot was transferred to Birmingham City for £18,000 in 1965. He was a fixture in the City side during the next four and a half years and eventually gained international recognition. He made his Scotland debut in October 1968, in a 1–0 victory over Denmark in a friendly in Copenhagen, and played a further seven times for the national side. His last cap came just a year after his first, in a 3–2 defeat by West Germany in a FIFA World Cup qualifier in Hamburg.

By 1970 Herriot had fallen from favour at St Andrew's and, following loan spells with Mansfield Town and Aston Villa, he left for South African club Durban City. He returned to Britain in 1971, joining Eddie Turnbull's developing Hibernian side. With Hibs he won his first career honour, the 1972–73 Scottish League Cup, as well as the fledgling Drybrough Cup on two occasions.

He left the Edinburgh side to join St Mirren in 1973, then moved to Partick Thistle in 1975. After a spell on loan with Morton in October 1975 he returned to Dunfermline Athletic in early 1976 before joining Morton permanently for the 1976–77 season. He retired from the game in the summer of 1977.

== Literary alter ego ==
Herriot is probably best known today for giving his name to the writer James Herriot, a Yorkshire vet whose real name was James Alfred Wight. Wight needed a pen-name to comply with professional rules banning advertising and chose Jim Herriot's name after seeing him play for Birmingham City in a televised match against Manchester United.

== Death ==
Herriot died on 23 April 2025, at the age of 85.

== Career statistics ==
Appearances and goals by national team and year
National team	Year	Apps	Goals
Scotland	1968	2	0
Scotland	1969	6	0
Total		8	0
