= Mickey Bullock =

English footballer (1946–2024)

Personal information
- Full name: Michael Edwin Bullock
- Date of birth: 2 October 1946
- Place of birth: Stoke-on-Trent, England
- Date of death: 27 December 2024 (aged 78)
- Position: Centre-forward

Youth career
- 1962–1963: Birmingham City

Senior career*
Years	Team	Apps	(Gls)
1963–1967	Birmingham City	27	(10)
1967–1968	Oxford United	59	(15)
1968–1976	Leyton Orient	277	(65)
1976–1981	Halifax Town	106	(19)
Total		469	(109)

Managerial career
- 1981–1984: Halifax Town
- 1986–1987: Goole Town
- 1987–1991: Ossett Town
- * Club domestic league appearances and goals

Michael Edwin Bullock (2 October 1946 – 27 December 2024) was an English football player and manager.

== Career ==
A centre-forward, Bullock scored 109 goals in 469 appearances in the Football League playing for Birmingham City, Oxford United, Leyton Orient and Halifax Town.

Bullock served as coach at Halifax Town at the end of his playing career and became the manager on 13 July 1981. He was sacked on 22 October 1984. Bullock was manager for 148 league matches, of which Halifax won 39, drew 46 and lost 63; their highest finishing position was 11th in the Fourth Division in the 1982–83 season. His most notable signing was that of striker Bobby Davison, who was captured for a fee of £20,000 from Huddersfield Town and following success at Halifax signed for Derby County and then Leeds United.

Bullock later managed Goole Town, winning the West Riding County Cup. Appointed manager of Ossett Town in the summer of 1987, he led the club to successive promotions, from the Northern Counties East League Division 2 in 1989, and the following season from Division 1 to the Premier Division. Ossett also won the League Cup in 1990. Bullock left Ossett in 1991 and worked as a scout for a number of Football League clubs.

== Personal life and death ==
Bullock's older brother, Peter, played for Stoke City and Birmingham City, amongst others, in the 1960s.

Bullock died on the morning of 27 December 2024, at the age of 78.
