= Johnny Vincent (footballer) =

English footballer

Personal information
- Full name: John Victor Vincent
- Date of birth: 8 February 1947
- Place of birth: West Bromwich, England
- Date of death: 23 December 2006 (aged 59)
- Place of death: Kidderminster, England
- Height: 5 ft 11 in (1.80 m)
- Position: Midfielder

Youth career
- 1962–1964: Birmingham City

Senior career*
Years	Team	Apps	(Gls)
1964–1971	Birmingham City	171	(41)
1971–1972	Middlesbrough	40	(7)
1972–1975	Cardiff City	66	(11)
1975–1977	Atherstone Town		
1977	Connecticut Bicentennials	10	(4)
- * Club domestic league appearances and goals

John Victor Vincent (8 February 1947 – 23 December 2006) was an English professional footballer who played as an attacking midfielder or inside forward. He made nearly 300 appearances and scored 59 goals in the Football League. After a spell in non-League football he finished his playing career in the United States.

== Life and career ==
Vincent was born in West Bromwich, Staffordshire. He joined Birmingham City when he left school, and made his first-team debut in March 1964, shortly after his 17th birthday. His style of play was elegant and he was consistent in his ability to launch an attack, whether by good passing of the ball or by purposeful running. When he became a first team regular, some three years after making his debut, he was creating chances for Barry Bridges, Geoff Vowden and Fred Pickering; later he supplied Jimmy Greenhoff, Bob Latchford and Bob Hatton. He had a powerful shot himself; for Birmingham he scored 44 goals in 194 appearances in all competitions. He remained first choice under Stan Cullis's management, but Cullis's successor Freddie Goodwin traded him for Middlesbrough's more physical George Smith, both players being valued at £40,000. He spent one season at Middlesbrough followed by three years with Cardiff City, before returning to the Midlands with Atherstone Town. He finished his playing career with a season in the NASL with Connecticut Bicentennials.

After football, he spent 13 years in the licensed trade in the West Midlands area. He died of cancer in a Kidderminster, Worcestershire, nursing home at the age of 59.
