= Colin Green =

Welsh footballer

Personal information
- Full name: Robert Colin Green
- Date of birth: 10 February 1942 (age 84)
- Place of birth: Brymbo, Wrexham, Wales
- Position: Full back

Youth career
- 1957–1959: Everton

Senior career*
| Years | Team | Apps | (Gls) |
| 1959–1962 | Everton | 15 | (1) |
| 1962–1971 | Birmingham City | 183 | (1) |
| 1970–1971 | Wrexham | 3 | (0) |
| 1971–197? | Tamworth | | |

International career
| 1961–1965 | Wales U23 | 7 | (0) |
| 1964–1969 | Wales | 15 | (0) |
- * Club domestic league appearances and goals

Robert Colin Green (born 10 February 1942) is a Welsh former footballer born in Brymbo, near Wrexham, who made 201 appearances in the Football League playing as a full back for Everton, Birmingham City and Wrexham. He played most of his professional club football for Birmingham City and was part of the team which won the League Cup in 1963. At international level he won 15 caps for Wales.

== Honours ==
Birmingham City

- Football League Cup: 1962–63
