= Brian Sharples =

English footballer

Personal information
- Date of birth: 6 September 1944 (age 82)
- Place of birth: Bradford, England
- Position: Centre half

Youth career
- 1959–1961: Birmingham City

Senior career*
Years	Team	Apps	(Gls)
1961–1968	Birmingham City	61	(4)
1968–1971	Exeter City	68	(4)
- * Club domestic league appearances and goals

Brian Sharples (born 6 September 1944) is an English former professional footballer born in Bradford who played as a centre half. He made 139 appearances in the Football League playing for Birmingham City and Exeter City.
