= Denis Thwaites =

English footballer (1944–2015

Personal information
- Full name: Denis Thwaites
- Date of birth: 14 December 1944
- Place of birth: Stockton-on-Tees, England
- Date of death: 26 June 2015 (aged 70)
- Place of death: Port El Kantaoui, Tunisia
- Position: Outside left

Youth career
- 1960–1961: Birmingham City

Senior career*
| Years | Team | Apps | (Gls) |
| 1961–1972 | Birmingham City | 86 | (18) |

International career
- England Schools
| 1961–1963 | England Youth | | |
- * Club domestic league appearances and goals

Denis Thwaites (14 December 1944 – 26 June 2015) was an English professional footballer who made 86 appearances in the Football League for Birmingham City. He represented England at schoolboy and youth level. He played as an outside left.

== Life and career ==
Thwaites was born and raised in Stockton-on-Tees, County Durham. As a youngster, he was a member of the Stockton Schools team that reached the semifinal of the English Schools' Shield in 1960, represented his county at under-15 level, and played several times for England Schoolboys. In April 1960, he created a goal for Bill Atkinson in a 3–0 defeat of Wales Schools; a few weeks later, the favour was returned in a 5–3 win against the Scottish Schools XI, when "England scored within 30 seconds of the start, the ball flowing sweetly from right to left, for Atkinson's centre to be summarily despatched into the net by Thwaites".

He joined First Division club Birmingham City as a 15-year-old in 1960, and made his first-team debut a year later, standing in for Bertie Auld in a League Cup loss to Swindon Town in September 1961. He also featured for England Youth between 1961 and 1963. He turned professional in May 1962, and played in several First Division matches at the start of the 1962–63 season, displacing Auld from the side. However he was only a first-team regular for an 18-month spell between 1964 and 1966, and suffered badly from nerves while playing. His last appearance for the first team came in the 1970–71 season, and he retired from professional football in 1972 at the relatively young age of 27. He then had a brief stint with the Solihull-based Rover Company's team playing in the Birmingham Works League.

Thwaites was married to Elaine Stanley, a hairdresser. The couple moved to Blackpool where they raised their daughter, Lindsey, and where Thwaites worked as a hospital porter. A nephew, Steve Lilwall, played League football for West Bromwich Albion. While on holiday in Port el Kantaoui, Tunisia, in June 2015, Thwaites and his wife were among those murdered in the Sousse attacks. A minute's silence was held in their memory on 1 August 2015 before Birmingham City's friendly game against Leicester City at St Andrew's.
