= Geoff Vowden =

English footballer (1941–2026)

Personal information
- Full name: Geoffrey Alan Vowden
- Date of birth: 27 April 1941
- Place of birth: Barnsley, England
- Date of death: 25 March 2026 (aged 84)
- Position: Forward

Youth career
- Jersey D.M.
- Nottingham Forest

Senior career*
Years	Team	Apps	(Gls)
1960–1964	Nottingham Forest	90	(40)
1964–1971	Birmingham City	221	(79)
1971–1974	Aston Villa	97	(22)
1974	New York Cosmos	15	(2)
1974–1975	Kettering Town	42	(4)
Total		465	(147)

Managerial career
- 1974–1975: Kettering Town
- * Club domestic league appearances and goals

Geoffrey Alan Vowden (27 April 1941 – 25 March 2026) was an English professional footballer who played as a forward in the Football League for Nottingham Forest, Birmingham City and Aston Villa, and in the North American Soccer League for the New York Cosmos.

== Career ==
Vowden was born in Barnsley, Yorkshire and raised in Jersey. When he was 18, he moved to England to join Nottingham Forest, where he signed professional forms at Christmas 1959. After scoring 40 goals in 90 League games for Forest, he was sold to Birmingham City for £25,000 in October 1964.

He spent nearly seven seasons at Birmingham, scoring at a rate of one goal every three matches, and finished as their leading goalscorer three seasons running, from 1964–65 to 1966–67. On 7 September 1968, playing for Birmingham against Huddersfield Town in the Second Division, he became the first substitute to score a hat-trick in a Football League fixture.

In March 1971, Vowden joined Vic Crowe's Aston Villa for a fee of £12,500. In his first full season at Aston Villa, he scored 11 goals which contributed to the club winning the Third Division championship.

In the summer of 1974, he played for the New York Cosmos in the North American Soccer League. On his return, he joined Southern League club Kettering Town as player/manager, succeeding Ron Atkinson, in December 1974. He later coached domestically and in Hong Kong winning honours with both Bulova SA and South China, and Saudi Arabia. Geoff ended his working career supporting adults with physical and sensory impairments in Corby.

== Death ==
Vowden died on 25 March 2026, at the age of 84.

== Honours ==
Aston Villa

- Third Division: 1971–72
