= Ron Wylie =

Scottish footballer (1933–2020)

Personal information
- Full name: Ronald Maurice Wylie
- Date of birth: 6 August 1933
- Place of birth: Glasgow, Scotland
- Date of death: 14 April 2020 (aged 86)
- Positions: Right half; inside forward

Youth career
- Clydesdale Juniors
- 1948–1950: Notts County

Senior career*
Years	Team	Apps	(Gls)
1950–1958	Notts County	227	(35)
1958–1965	Aston Villa	196	(16)
1965–1970	Birmingham City	128	(2)
Total		551	(53)

Managerial career
- 1981–1982: Bulova
- 1982–1984: West Bromwich Albion
- * Club domestic league appearances and goals

Ronald Maurice Wylie (6 August 1933 – 14 April 2020) was a Scottish football player, coach and manager. He played as a right half or inside forward for Notts County, Aston Villa and Birmingham City, making more than 550 appearances in the Football League, and more than 700 in all competitions. As a manager, he took charge of West Bromwich Albion between 1982 and 1984.

== Playing career ==
An inside-forward, Wylie made his name at Notts County before transferring to Aston Villa in 1958.

The 25-year-old Wylie made his debut on 22 Nov 1958, in a 2-0 home victory over Preston. Wylie spent seven years at Aston Villa, establishing himself as the midfield schemer in the side, which won the Second Division title and promotion to the First Division in the 1959–60 season and achieved League Cup success a year later. Highly regarded by the club's fans, he was not capped by Scotland, likely due to the abundance of quality midfielders available at the time. The 31-year-old played his last Villa match on 24 April 1965, a 1-1 draw away to Fulham.

In 1965, Wylie transferred to Birmingham City. Considered past his best when he made the move, he went on to play nearly 150 games for the club, was appointed club captain, and retired in 1970 at the age of 37.

== Management career ==
On retirement as a player, Wylie joined the coaching staff at Aston Villa before moving to Coventry City, first as coach and later as assistant manager. He took an advisory post in Cyprus before returning to England where he was appointed manager at West Bromwich Albion in 1982. With Ron Atkinson being replaced by Ronnie Allen, the club had sold players such as Bryan Robson, Remi Moses and Peter Barnes, leading to a decline in the club's fortunes. The side began the 1982–83 season well, winning 7 of the first 11 and were in contention for a UEFA Cup place for much of the season, but a late slump in form saw them finish 11th (the last time the club finished in the top half of the top flight until the 2011-12 season).

The following season, West Brom's form was mediocre although the side were always several points clear of the relegation zone. Wylie left the manager's position in February and was replaced by Johnny Giles.

He returned to Aston Villa to take charge of the reserve team, later working as a scout before yet again rejoining Villa as community liaison officer, a post which he held until retirement in 2002.

== Personal life ==
Wylie's grandson, Alex Grove, played rugby union for Worcester Warriors and the Scotland national team. Though born in England, Grove qualified for Scotland through his Glasgow-born grandfather.

Wylie died on 14 April 2020 after a long illness.

== Honours ==
Aston Villa

- Football League Cup: 1960–61; runner-up: 1962–63
