= Malcolm Beard =

English footballer

Personal information
- Full name: Malcolm Beard
- Date of birth: 3 May 1942 (age 84)
- Place of birth: Cannock, England
- Height: 5 ft 9 in (1.75 m)
- Position: Wing half

Youth career
- 1957–1959: Birmingham City

Senior career*
Years	Team	Apps	(Gls)
1959–1971	Birmingham City	350	(26)
1971–1973	Aston Villa	6	(0)
1973–1974	Atherstone Town		
- * Club domestic league appearances and goals

Malcolm Beard (born 3 May 1942) is an English former professional footballer born in Cannock, Staffordshire, who made more than 350 appearances in the Football League playing as a wing half.

He spent the vast majority of his playing career at Birmingham City, for whom he made 405 appearances in all competitions. He joined the club as an amateur in 1957 when he left school, and turned professional in May 1959. He also played for Aston Villa and in non-league football for Atherstone Town. He went on to coach in England and abroad, and was employed as chief scout by Leicester City and Aston Villa. He was capped for England at youth level.

== Honours ==
Birmingham City

- Football League Cup: 1962–63
- Inter-Cities Fairs Cup runner-up: 1960–61
