= 1962–63 Football League Cup =

1962–63 League Cup
Tournament details
- Country: England; Wales
- Teams: 80

Final positions
- Champions: Birmingham City
- Runners-up: Aston Villa

Tournament statistics
- Matches played: 102
- Top goal scorer(s): Derek Dougan; Bobby Thompson; Alex Harley (5 goals)

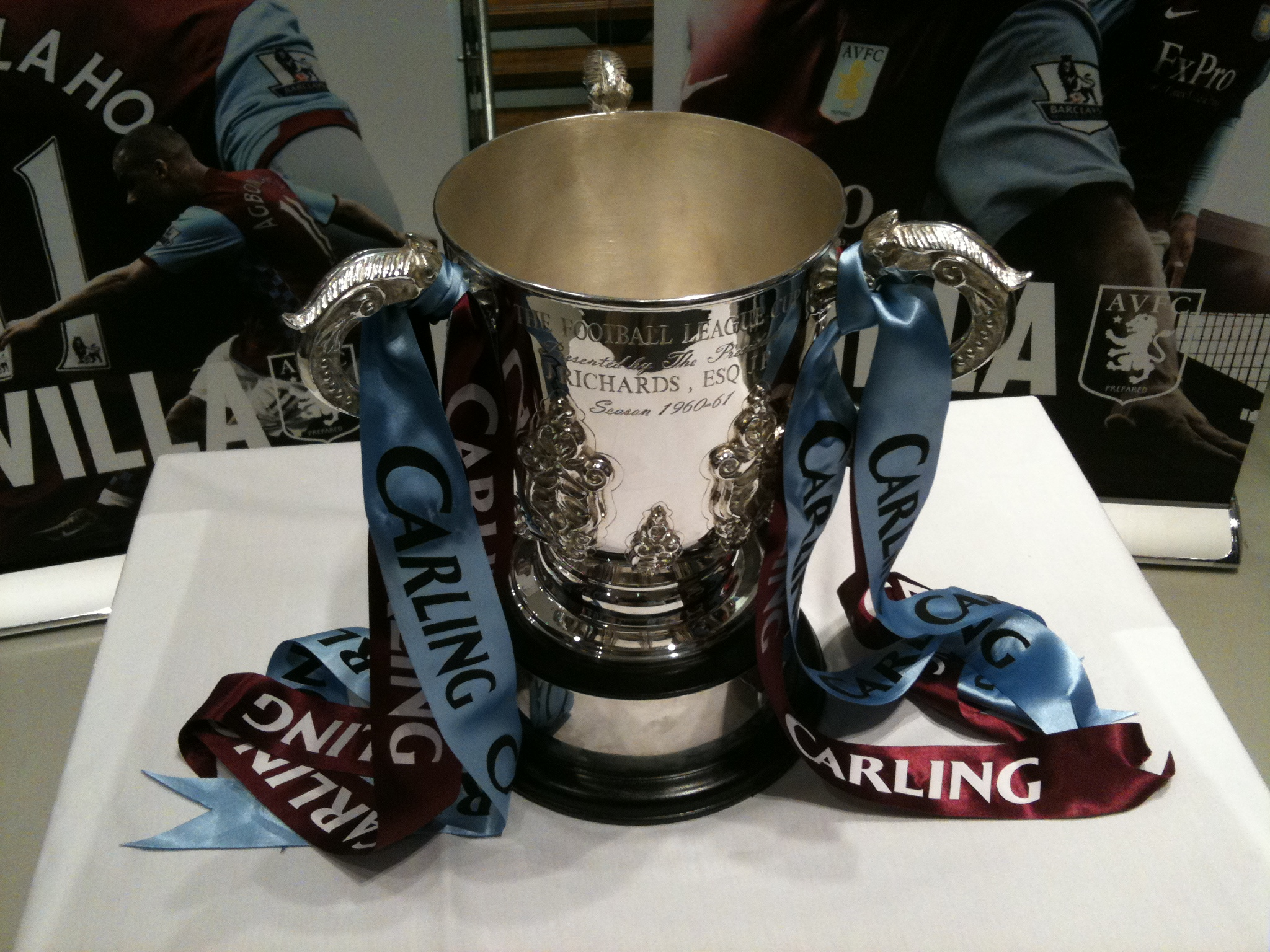
A replica of the English League Cup trophy on display in the store of Aston Villa Football Club in Birmingham.

The 1962–63 Football League Cup was the third season of the Football League Cup, a knockout competition for England's top 92 football clubs; only 80 of them took part. (Note: Arsenal, Burnley, Chelsea, Everton, Ipswich Town, Liverpool, Manchester United, Nottingham Forest, Sheffield Wednesday, Tottenham Hotspur, West Bromwich Albion and Wolverhampton Wanderers were the 12 League clubs that did not compete.) The competition began on 3 September 1962, and ended with the two-legged final on 23 and 27 May 1963.

The tournament was won by Birmingham City, who beat near-neighbours Aston Villa 3–1 on aggregate. Birmingham won the first leg 3–1 at their home ground St Andrew's, thanks to goals from Jimmy Bloomfield and Ken Leek (2), with Bobby Thomson scoring Villa's goal. The second leg at Villa Park ended in a 0–0 draw and Birmingham won 3–1 on aggregate.

Match dates and results were initially drawn from Soccerbase, and they were later checked against Rothmans Football Yearbook 1970–71.

== Calendar ==
Of the 80 teams, 48 received a bye to the second round and the other 32 played in the first round; these were the teams ranked 61st to 91st in the 1961–62 Football League, plus Oxford United, who had entered the Football League as replacements for Accrington Stanley. Semi-finals and final were played over two legs.

Round	Main date	Fixtures		Clubs	New entries this round
Round	Main date	Original	Replays	Clubs	New entries this round
First Round	5 September 1962	16	4	80 → 64	32 (teams ranked 17th–24th in Third Division; all Fourth Division; 1 new club)
Second Round	26 September 1962	32	11	64 → 32	48 (all First and Second Division, except those teams that did not enter; teams ranked 1st–16th in Third Division)
Third Round	17 October 1962	16	4	32 → 16	none
Fourth Round	14 November 1962	8	1	16 → 8	none
Fifth Round	3 December 1962	4	0	8 → 4	none
Semi-finals	January–April 1963	4	0	4 → 2	none
Final	23 & 27 May 1963	2	0	2 → 1	none

== First round ==
=== Ties ===
Home team	Score	Away team	Date
Aldershot	2–0	Exeter City	05-09-1962
Barrow	3–2	Workington	05-09-1962
Bradford City	2–2	Doncaster Rovers	05-09-1962
Brentford	3–0	Wrexham	04-09-1962
Chester	2–0	Stockport County	05-09-1962
Crewe Alexandra	2–3	Oldham Athletic	05-09-1962
Darlington	1–0	Chesterfield	05-09-1962
Halifax Town	2–3	Mansfield Town	13-09-1962
Hartlepools United	1–1	Barnsley	06-09-1962
Newport County	2–1	Gillingham	05-09-1962
Shrewsbury Town	3–1	Millwall	05-09-1962
Southport	0–0	Rochdale	05-09-1962
Torquay United	2–0	Oxford United	03-09-1962
Tranmere Rovers	2–3	Carlisle United	03-09-1962
Watford	1–2	Colchester United	06-09-1962
York City	2–2	Lincoln City	05-09-1962

=== Replays ===
Home team	Score	Away team	Date
Barnsley	2–1	Hartlepools United	13-09-1962
Doncaster Rovers	2–0	Bradford City	18-09-1962
Lincoln City	2–0	York City	19-09-1962
Rochdale	1–2	Southport	18-09-1962

== Second round ==
=== Ties ===
Home team	Score	Away team	Date
Aldershot	0–3	Newport County	26-09-1962
Aston Villa	6–1	Peterborough United	24-09-1962
Barnsley	3–2	Grimsby Town	25-09-1962
Barrow	3–1	Shrewsbury Town	24-09-1962
Birmingham City	5–0	Doncaster Rovers	26-09-1962
Bradford Park Avenue	3–1	Huddersfield Town	26-09-1962
Brentford	1–4	Sheffield United	26-09-1962
Brighton & Hove Albion	1–5	Portsmouth	25-09-1962
Bristol City	1–2	Rotherham United	25-09-1962
Bristol Rovers	2–0	Port Vale	27-09-1962
Bury	2–2	Lincoln City	24-09-1962
Cardiff City	5–1	Reading	26-09-1962
Chester	2–2	Mansfield Town	26-09-1962
Coventry City	3–2	Swansea Town	26-09-1962
Derby County	1–1	Blackburn Rovers	26-09-1962
Fulham	4–0	Bournemouth & Boscombe Athletic	26-09-1962
Hull City	2–2	Middlesbrough	24-09-1962
Leeds United	2–1	Crystal Palace	26-09-1962
Leicester City	4–4	Charlton Athletic	26-09-1962
Manchester City	0–0	Blackpool	24-09-1962
Newcastle United	1–1	Leyton Orient	26-09-1962
Northampton Town	2–0	Colchester United	26-09-1962
Norwich City	4–0	Bolton Wanderers	26-09-1962
Queens Park Rangers	1–2	Preston North End	24-09-1962
Southampton	1–1	Scunthorpe United	24-09-1962
Southend United	2–3	Notts County	26-09-1962
Southport	1–3	Luton Town	24-09-1962
Sunderland	7–1	Oldham Athletic	24-09-1962
Swindon Town	4–0	Darlington	25-09-1962
Torquay United	1–2	Carlisle United	26-09-1962
Walsall	1–2	Stoke City	25-09-1962
West Ham United	6–0	Plymouth Argyle	26-09-1962

=== Replays ===
Home team	Score	Away team	Date
Blackburn Rovers	3–1	Derby County	02-10-1962
Blackpool	3–3	Manchester City	08-10-1962
Charlton Athletic	2–1	Leicester City	02-10-1962
Leyton Orient	4–2	Newcastle United	01-10-1962
Lincoln City	2–3	Bury	08-10-1962
Mansfield Town	0–1	Chester	10-10-1962
Middlesbrough	1–1	Hull City	08-10-1962
Scunthorpe United	2–2	Southampton	02-10-1962

=== 2nd Replays ===
Home team	Score	Away team	Date
Hull City	3–0	Middlesbrough	10-10-1962
Manchester City	4–2	Blackpool	15-10-1962
Southampton	0–3	Scunthorpe United	09-10-1962

== Third round ==
=== Ties ===
Home team	Score	Away team	Date
Aston Villa	3–1	Stoke City	17-10-1962
Barnsley	1–2	Luton Town	16-10-1962
Barrow	1–1	Birmingham City	15-10-1962
Blackburn Rovers	4–0	Leeds United	17-10-1962
Bradford Park Avenue	2–2	Charlton Athletic	16-10-1962
Bristol Rovers	2–0	Cardiff City	23-10-1962
Bury	3–1	Sheffield United	23-10-1962
Carlisle United	1–1	Norwich City	16-10-1962
Hull City	1–2	Fulham	17-10-1962
Leyton Orient	9–2	Chester	17-10-1962
Newport County	1–2	Manchester City	24-10-1962
Northampton Town	1–1	Preston North End	16-10-1962
Notts County	5–0	Swindon Town	17-10-1962
Portsmouth	5–1	Coventry City	17-10-1962
Rotherham United	3–1	West Ham United	16-10-1962
Sunderland	2–0	Scunthorpe United	17-10-1962

=== Replays ===
Home team	Score	Away team	Date
Birmingham City	5–1	Barrow	29-10-1962
Charlton Athletic	1–0	Bradford Park Avenue	23-10-1962
Norwich City	5–0	Carlisle United	24-10-1962
Preston North End	2–1	Northampton Town	29-10-1962

== Fourth round ==
=== Ties ===
Home team	Score	Away team	Date
Aston Villa	6–2	Preston North End	12-11-1962
Birmingham City	3–2	Notts County	14-11-1962
Blackburn Rovers	4–1	Rotherham United	14-11-1962
Bury	3–1	Bristol Rovers	13-11-1962
Leyton Orient	3–2	Charlton Athletic	12-11-1962
Manchester City	1–0	Luton Town	14-11-1962
Norwich City	1–0	Fulham	14-11-1962
Portsmouth	0–0	Sunderland	14-11-1962

=== Replay ===
Home team	Score	Away team	Date
Sunderland	2–1	Portsmouth	21-11-1962

== Fifth round ==
=== Ties ===
Home team	Score	Away team	Date
Aston Villa	4–1	Norwich City	03-12-1962
Birmingham City	6–0	Manchester City	11-12-1962
Leyton Orient	0–2	Bury	03-12-1962
Sunderland	3–2	Blackburn Rovers	05-12-1962

== Semi-finals ==
=== First leg ===
Home team	Score	Away team	Date
Birmingham City	3–2	Bury	27-03-1963
Sunderland	1–3	Aston Villa	12-01-1963

=== Second leg ===
Home team	Score	Away team	Date	Agg
Aston Villa	0–0	Sunderland	22-04-1963	3–1
Bury	1–1	Birmingham City	08-04-1963	3–4

== Final ==
The final was played over two legs. The first leg was held at St Andrew's, Birmingham on 23 May 1963 and the second leg was held at Villa Park, Birmingham, on 27 May 1963.

23 May 1963

Birmingham City	3–1	Aston Villa
Bloomfield; Leek	Summary	Thomson

St Andrew's, Birmingham
Attendance: 31,580
Referee: E. Crawford
27 May 1963

Aston Villa	0–0	Birmingham City
	Summary

Villa Park, Birmingham
Attendance: 37,921
Referee: A.W. Sparling

Birmingham City won 3–1 on aggregate.
