= 1960 Inter-Cities Fairs Cup final =

- Event: 1958–60 Inter-Cities Fairs Cup
Birmingham City	Barcelona
(England)	(Spain)
1	4
- on aggregate

First leg
Birmingham City	Barcelona
0	0
- Date: 29 March 1960
- Venue: St Andrew's, Birmingham
- Referee: Lucien Van Nuffel (Belgium)
- Attendance: 40,524

Second leg
Barcelona	Birmingham City
4	1
- Date: 4 May 1960
- Venue: Camp Nou, Barcelona
- Referee: Lucien Van Nuffel (Belgium)
- Attendance: 70,000

The 1960 Inter-Cities Fairs Cup final was an association football match played over two legs between Barcelona of Spain and Birmingham City of England. The first leg was played at St Andrew's, Birmingham, on 29 March 1960, and the second leg was played on 4 May at the Camp Nou, Barcelona. It was the final of the second edition of the Inter-Cities Fairs Cup, an invitational competition open to teams representing host cities of industrial trade fairs. Birmingham were the first English club side to appear in a European final. Barcelona had beaten the London XI in the inaugural final in 1958, having needed a replay to eliminate Birmingham in the semi-final.

Each club needed to progress through three rounds to reach the final. Matches were contested over two legs, with one leg at each team's home ground. Barcelona won each of their three ties by at least two goals, and in the semi-final beat Italian club Inter Milan by eight goals to two. Birmingham's progress to the final was less emphatic, but they still won all three home legs and did not lose away from home. An 8–4 aggregate victory over Belgian club Union Saint-Gilloise represented their biggest winning margin.

In the first leg of the final, played in dreadful weather in front of a crowd of 40,524 at St Andrew's, Birmingham produced a fine defensive performance to hold Barcelona to a goalless draw. In the second leg, watched by 70,000 spectators, Barcelona were 2–0 up after only six minutes with goals from Eulogio Martínez and Zoltán Czibor. Czibor scored again and Lluís Coll added a fourth before Harry Hooper's late consolation made the final score 4–1. Thus Barcelona won the trophy for the second consecutive staging of the competition.

== Background ==
As friendly matches had often been played between teams from cities hosting international trade fairs, a knockout cup was first proposed in 1950 to provide a competitive structure for such matches. Entry to the competition, which began in 1955 and became known as the Inter-Cities Fairs Cup, was by invitation extended not to football clubs but to the host city. Some cities entered a selection including players from more than one of that city's clubs, while others, including the cities of Birmingham and Barcelona, were represented by a single club. To enable matches to be scheduled alongside the associated trade fair, three playing seasons were needed to the complete the inaugural competition. For the second edition, of which this final was the culmination, the organising committee changed the format, removing the initial group stage in favour of a straight 16-team knockout, in order to accommodate the tournament within two normal seasons.

CF Barcelona had needed a replay to defeat Birmingham City in the semi-final of the inaugural Fairs Cup, and went on to beat the London representative XI in the final. As champions of Spain in the 1958–59 domestic season, Barcelona qualified for the 1959–60 European Cup, and played matches in that competition alongside the later rounds of the Fairs Cup. Birmingham had reached the final of a European competition for the first time, and were the first English club team to do so.

Birmingham had struggled for most of the 1959–60 domestic season. Needing at least a draw from their last First Division match to be sure of avoiding relegation, they won that match, and finished the season in 19th place, two points (equivalent to one win) clear of the relegation zone. In contrast, Barcelona confirmed their second consecutive Spanish league title on the last day of the season, defeating Zaragoza by a five-goal margin to ensure parity on points with Real Madrid and increase their advantage on goal average. Barcelona therefore qualified for the 1960–61 European Cup, and both they and Birmingham accepted invitations to participate in that season's Fairs Cup.

== Route to the final ==
=== Barcelona ===
Route to the final: Barcelona
Round	Opposition	First leg	Second leg	Aggregate score
First	Basel XI	2–1 (a)	5–2 (h)	7–3
Quarter-final	Inter Milan	4–0 (h)	4–2 (a)	8–2
Semi-final	Belgrade XI	1–1 (a)	3–1 (h)	4–2

On a poor pitch made worse by the ground authorities scheduling an amateur match before the main event, and in persistent sleet so cold that players could not feel their feet, Barcelona beat a defensively sound Basel representative eleven 2–1 with goals from Enric Gensana and Evaristo. In the home leg, Barcelona took a four-goal lead before winning the match 5–2 to take the tie 7–3 on aggregate.

In the quarter-final, they faced Inter Milan of Italy, whom Barcelona coach Helenio Herrera likened to his own club: a great team with a rich history and excellent imported players. In the home leg, Barcelona won by four goals to nil. ABC's reporter suggested that had Inter's goalkeeper Enzo Matteucci not been on such good form the winning margin might have been even wider, and picked out the defence, especially Rodri, and wing-half Joan Segarra as being outstanding in blunting the attack of the Milan stars. The second leg was played in September 1959, by which time Barcelona, as reigning Spanish champions, were competing in the European Cup as well as the Fairs Cup. Barcelona produced what ABC reported as a "magnificent exhibition" to win the away leg 4–2.

On a difficult surface in Belgrade and playing into the wind, Barcelona's defence held its own against the local representative eleven–– effectively a Yugoslav national selection – who played with pace and toughness. Just before the half-time interval, Suárez broke with pace, feeding Eulogio Martínez, who played Evaristo in to score from close range with a powerful shot. In the second half, Kostic was brought down and the referee awarded a penalty, but Antoni Ramallets pushed it out for a corner which led to nothing. This roused the Belgrade players, but Ramallets kept them at bay. In a rare counter-attack, Martínez appeared to be fouled in the penalty area but the referee gave nothing. Halfway through the period, Bora Kostić scored a deserved equaliser. Star of the Barcelona team was Ramón Alberto Villaverde, who was active in all areas of the pitch and picked out by El Mundo Deportivo as the cornerstone of Barcelona's game-plan.

Herrera saw the second leg, played some six weeks later, as the hardest match they would play that year, and hoped a replay would not be needed. László Kubala opened the scoring after only five minutes with a free kick from just outside the penalty area, and Barcelona had the better of the first half, but in the 44th minute, a break down the right was finished by Branislav Mihajlović from close range to tie the scores. It was Barcelona who began the second half playing hard, physical football. After 57 minutes, Evaristo avoided the attentions of two opponents to score Barcelona's second. When Martínez' cross shot went in, the Yugoslavs reacted badly, trying to attack the linesman, and Lazar Tasić was sent off. Neither side played football during the last few minutes of the match.

=== Birmingham City ===
Route to the final: Birmingham City
Round	Opposition	First leg	Second leg	Aggregate score
First	Cologne XI	2–2 (a)	2–0 (h)	4–2
Quarter-final	Zagreb XI	1–0 (h)	3–3 (a)	4–3
Semi-final	Union Saint-Gilloise	4–2 (a)	4–2 (h)	8–4

Two weeks before Birmingham's opening match, away to a Cologne representative team, Arthur Turner, who had led Birmingham to the semi-final of the competition the previous season, resigned as joint manager, leaving Pat Beasley in a caretaker role. Watched by a contingent from a local Royal Air Force fighter station, Birmingham fell two goals behind. Dick Neal reduced the deficit just before half-time, Birmingham spent the interval persuading the referee to fully inflate the ball – the softer ball was perceived as better suited to the Germans' slower style of play – and had much the better of the second half. Harry Hooper scored a fine individual goal to secure a draw. For the second leg, the German side was depleted by injury and work commitments – they were all part-time players – and Birmingham won comfortably with goals from Bunny Larkin and Brian Taylor.

At home in the first leg against a Zagreb XI full of players with international experience, Birmingham were without Trevor Smith, away with the England under-23 team. They won one-nil, Larkin scoring a first-half header, and goalkeeper Johnny Schofield producing several good saves to maintain the lead. They prepared for the visit to Zagreb with three friendly matches in Switzerland, in one of which Larkin was sent off and received a 14-day suspension from the Football Association (the FA). A lively game in Zagreb finished 3–3, with goals from Larkin (2) and Hooper, giving Birmingham a 4–3 aggregate win, but Smith and Zagreb forward Dionizije Dvornić were sent off late in the game. As one of four players sent off that summer while playing abroad, Smith was severely censured by the FA, who issued a warning that "misconduct on the field of play of the nature reported brings English football into disrepute and may lead to future applications by the clubs concerned to make foreign tours being refused".

Birmingham went into the away leg of their semi-final against Belgian club Union Saint-Gilloise under strict orders to respect the referee's whistle, and on a mission to "salvag[e] some shred of our Soccer reputation—so ruthlessly wrecked" by Wolverhampton Wanderers' first-leg defeat to East German team Vorwärts Berlin and Manchester United's 6–1 capitulation at home to Real Madrid. Anderlecht manager Bill Gormlie described Union Saint-Gilloise as "fit, fast and powerful", and thought Birmingham "will do well to go home with only a one-goal deficit." In the event, they did rather better than that. Hooper, Bryan Orritt, Taylor and Jim Barrett, who had signed only days before the game, gave them a 4–2 victory. The match was the last of goalkeeper Gil Merrick's club-record 551 competitive appearances in Birmingham's first team. At St Andrew's, in fog so thick that there was a distinct possibility of the match being abandoned, Birmingham repeated the 4–2 scoreline. They became the first British club side to reach a European final, despite playing with ten men from the 18th minute, after Taylor suffered a badly broken leg that was to keep him out of football for a year, and finishing the match with only nine when Barrett was also injured.

== First leg ==
The Barcelona team chose not to train before the first leg of the final, in Birmingham, preferring to prepare for the game by shopping and sightseeing. The match was played in "bitter, slanting rain" on a St Andrew's pitch that "almost from one goal to the other down the centre, was a series of little lakes". Birmingham played a "fast, open game" more suited to the conditions, while Barcelona's technical superiority was blunted both by the mud and by the "hard-tackling, grafting, bustling Birmingham defence, in which Smith and Neal in particular stood out like rocks long before the end". In the second half, Barcelona tired; El Mundo Deportivo noted that they had played a league match in Seville only 48 hours earlier and the players were not machines. The home side had three good chances: Ramallets dived at Hooper's feet, Weston ran the ball out of play when under no pressure, and a "sliding tackle from nowhere by Gensana turned away what looked like a certain goal", again for Weston, who said afterwards that the ball had stopped dead in the water.

Before the game, Trevor Smith had told the Daily Mirror that his team intended not to commit themselves to tackling their opponents, but rather to "funnel back" in defence, forcing the visitors to shoot from distance. That was indeed how they played, and the tactic was successful. The Mirror's Bill Holden wrote that "for a team struggling against relegation and up against the greatest collection of international stars by any European club, they did a wonderful job". At a time when televised football in Britain was still generally restricted to the FA Cup Final and England international matches, the second half of the match was covered live on the BBC, with commentary by Kenneth Wolstenholme.

=== Details ===
29 March 1960
19:15

Birmingham City (England)	0–0	(Spain) Barcelona

St Andrew's, Birmingham
Attendance: 40,524
Referee: Lucien van Nuffel (Belgium)

Birmingham City

Barcelona

GK	1	(England) Johnny Schofield
RB	2	(England) Brian Farmer
LB	3	(England) George Allen
RH	4	(England) Johnny Watts
CH	5	(England) Trevor Smith (c)
LH	6	(England) Dick Neal
OR	7	(England) Gordon Astall
IR	8	(England) Johnny Gordon
CF	9	(England) Don Weston
IL	10	(Wales) Bryan Orritt
OL	11	(England) Harry Hooper
Manager:
(England) Pat Beasley

GK	1	(Spain) Antoni Ramallets
RB	2	(Spain) Ferran Olivella
CB	3	(Spain) Sígfrid Gràcia
CB	4	(Spain) Joan Segarra
LB	5	(Spain) Rodri
MF	6	(Spain) Enric Gensana
MF	7	(Spain) Lluís Coll
MF	8	(Hungary) Sándor Kocsis
FW	9	(Spain) Eulogio Martínez
FW	10	(Spain) Enric Ribelles
FW	11	(Uruguay) Ramón Alberto Villaverde
Manager:
(Argentina) Helenio Herrera

== Second leg ==
After a heavy defeat to fierce rivals Real Madrid in the semi-final of the European Cup, Barcelona's directors issued a statement stressing the priority they had placed on winning that competition, in financial as well as footballing terms, and dismissed Helenio Herrera. Enric Rabassa was appointed in a caretaker role. With a six-goal lead from the first leg of their Copa del Generalísimo match against Ferrol, they were able to prepare for Birmingham's visit by resting some of their stronger players. El Mundo Deportivo's preview pointed out that Birmingham had been struggling in the league because of injuries, and had saved their best performances for cup matches, courtesy of the tough, tenacious quality of their team.

The Birmingham party – fifteen players, trainer, manager, doctor and six officials – arrived by air the afternoon before the match. Manager Pat Beasley told the press that his team had recovered from their slump in the league and were in great form, that although Barcelona were a great side, and would want to finish their opponents off in style in front of their fans, particularly after their disappointment in the European Cup, Birmingham's players were quicker and stronger than in the first leg and could spring a surprise. Trevor Smith hoped to put a brake on Barcelona as had been done in the first leg, and, while unwilling to make an explicit prediction, could envisage his team winning. The Daily Telegraph's David Miller confirmed that Birmingham were on top form, and reported that he expected at least 100 fans to make the journey from England to support their club.

Barcelona were two goals ahead after six minutes. The first came when Lluís Coll's corner was headed home by Eulogio Martínez, and a neat move was finished off by Zoltán Czibor who received a 30-yard (27 m) lofted pass on the edge of the penalty area, swivelled, and shot home for the second. Despite numerous corners, there was no further score in the first half, and prompted by the "tireless" Johnny Gordon, Birmingham had attempted to combat Barcelona in midfield. But shortly after the interval, Barcelona attacked down the right and Martínez passed to Czibor whose second goal killed the game. Gordon Astall had two chances at goal, the former going wide and the latter being deflected in spectacular fashion by Ramallets, before another attack down the right flank allowed Martínez to feed Coll, whose "fierce right-foot drive through a crowd of players" gave Barcelona a four-goal lead. With little time left, Peter Murphy, making his last appearance for Birmingham, counter-attacked down the left and sent a long cross-field pass towards Hooper, whose mobility helped him beat Ramallets to the ball and score with a header.

Rabassa had recalled star player László Kubala, who had been largely excluded from the team by Herrera, and once Barcelona established such an early lead, he was able to play a withdrawn role, viewed by El Mundo Deportivo's E.L. Jimeno as directing his team's play as a conductor directs his orchestra. The Times' correspondent's fears that Birmingham had missed their opportunity on a heavy pitch against a tiring opposition – "here was a setting that favoured Birmingham's particular style, and they did not win" – were realised. Although in both legs of the final, Birmingham had done their best to play with a greater flexibility than the traditional rigid "British" style, in which players stuck to their allotted position no matter what, such a change in style was not something a team could perfect in a few weeks. Once Barcelona had a two-goal lead so early in the proceedings, the superiority of their players was bound to tell.

Jimeno congratulated Lucien van Nuffel on his firmness in punishing Birmingham's dangerous play; in the last 15 minutes, some wild tackling had brought cautions for Brian Farmer and Johnny Watts. The official himself said that apart from some ill-temper born of frustration, that he thought he controlled quickly enough, neither side had given him any trouble.

=== Details ===
4 May 1960
20.30

Barcelona	4–1	Birmingham City
Martínez 3'; Czibor 6', 48'; Coll 78'		Hooper 82'

Camp Nou, Barcelona
Attendance: 70,000
Referee: Lucien van Nuffel (Belgium)

Barcelona

Birmingham City

GK	1	(Spain) Antoni Ramallets
RB	2	(Spain) Ferran Olivella
CB	3	(Spain) Sígfrid Gràcia
CB	4	(Spain) Martí Vergés
LB	5	(Spain) Rodri
MF	6	(Spain) Joan Segarra (c)
MF	7	(Spain) Lluís Coll
MF	8	(Spain) Enric Ribelles
FW	9	(Spain) Eulogio Martínez
FW	10	(Spain) László Kubala
FW	11	(Hungary) Zoltán Czibor
Manager:
(Spain) Enric Rabassa

GK	1	(England) Johnny Schofield
RB	2	(England) Brian Farmer
LB	3	(England) George Allen
RH	4	(England) Johnny Watts
CH	5	(England) Trevor Smith (c)
LH	6	(England) Dick Neal
OR	7	(England) Gordon Astall
IR	8	(England) Johnny Gordon
CF	9	(England) Don Weston
IL	10	(England) Peter Murphy
OL	11	(England) Harry Hooper
Manager:
(England) Pat Beasley

== Post-match ==
According to Jimmy Burns' book Barça, Helenio Herrera's ideal team combined "competitive spirit, strength and speed, together with technique". After Barcelona beat English champions Wolverhampton Wanderers 5–2 in the European Cup, Herrera told the assembled press that "You in England are playing now in the style that we Continentals used so many years ago, with much physical strength, but no method, no technique". This final had pitted the "Continental" against the "English" style of play, and the difference was reflected in the scoreline. El Mundo Deportivo repeated the common view that this was attributable to England's relative footballing isolation in recent years. The England team had suffered heavy defeats to European teams during the 1950s and the Football League, having refused Chelsea permission to take part in the inaugural European Cup, attempted to do the same to Manchester United, despite advice from football personalities including England captain Billy Wright that greater contact with Continental football should be encouraged in the interests of improving the standard of the English game. Because employment in English Football League clubs was restricted to those holding British or Irish passports, top foreign players could not play in England even if the maximum wage had not removed any financial incentive to do so: Birmingham's players earned £4 a win, while Barcelona's team received the equivalent of £218 per man for winning the Fairs Cup.

The annual meeting of the Fairs Cup organising committee, held in Barcelona alongside the final, decided to run the third edition of the competition within a single playing season. Despite having received applications from numerous additional teams, the organisers were unwilling to raise the number of participants from 16 for fear of fixture congestion. Both Barcelona and Birmingham accepted their invitation to compete: Birmingham reached the 1961 final, in which they lost to A.S. Roma, while Barcelona lost in the quarter-final. As 1960 Spanish champions, they also entered the European Cup and reached the final.

Birmingham stayed on in Spain for a post-season tour. They were invited to play Third Division Atlético Baleares in honour of the opening of the club's new stadium in Palma de Mallorca, but the game was abandoned with "scuffles going on all over the field" after two Birmingham men, Peter Murphy and Dick Neal, were sent off, the former for a foul on the hosts' captain, Crespí, that broke his leg so badly that he was forced to retire from football. The players' reputation both footballing and behavioural was to some extent redeemed in a charity match in aid of the "Pro Suburbios" campaign against slum housing, a 1–1 draw with a Sevilla XI that El Mundo Deportivo's sub-editor thought would not go down in history. But the trouble in Mallorca, combined with two sendings-off in this edition of the Fairs Cup and another in a friendly in Switzerland, resulted in the Football Association telling the Birmingham club that they "cannot play overseas until [they] have given firm undertakings to uphold the prestige and reputation of British clubs and the F.A. at all times".

== See also ==
- Birmingham City F.C. in international football
- FC Barcelona in international football
