= Lluís Coll =

Spanish footballer (1937–2008)

Personal information
- Full name: Lluís Coll Hortal
- Date of birth: 3 August 1937
- Place of birth: Anglès, Spain
- Date of death: 8 January 2008 (aged 70)
- Place of death: Salt, Spain
- Height: 1.71 m (5 ft 7 1/2 in)
- Position: Winger

Youth career
- –: Titán
- –: Girona

Senior career*
Years	Team	Apps	(Gls)
1955–1956	Girona		
1956–1961	Barcelona	25	(3)
1957–1958	→ Condal (loan)	17	(6)
1961–1963	Valencia	21	(3)
1963–1964	Granada	12	(1)
1964–1965	Olot		

International career
1960	Spain U21	1	(0)
1960	Spain B	1	(0)

Managerial career
- 1974–1975: Figueres
- 1976: Girona
- * Club domestic league appearances and goals

Lluís Coll Hortal (3 August 1937 – 8 January 2008) was a Spanish footballer who played as a winger. He scored 6 goals from 46 matches in La Liga playing for Barcelona and Valencia, and appeared in the lower divisions for Girona, Condal, Granada and Olot. He was capped for his country, once at under-21 level and once for Spain's 'B' team.

== Life and club career ==
Coll was born in Anglès, in the Province of Girona in Catalonia. He played for his local team, Titán, before joining the youth system of Tercera División club Girona FC. He made his first-team debut for that club as an 18-year-old, and towards the end of the 1955–56 season was scoring at a rate of almost a goal a game. He assessed his strengths as pace and a good touch.

At the end of that season, Coll signed a five-year contract with Barcelona, and made a promising first appearance in a post-season friendly against Brazilian club São Cristóvão, setting up a goal for Justo Tejada and scoring himself from Tejada's pass. He made his Primera División debut on the opening day of the 1956–57 season, in a 2–0 defeat of Osasuna, and played once more, before joining Segunda División club Condal on loan at the start of the next season. On his debut he was involved in their winning goal away at Avilés – but was promptly borrowed back by his owning club to replace the injured Tejada in a friendly against Borussia Dortmund. Coll, described by El Mundo Deportivo's reporter as pacy with technical skill and an unforgiving shot, converted a penalty to make the score 4–0.

His first top-flight goal came in January 1959, tricking the ball past the last opponent and scoring with a low shot to secure Barcelona's 2–1 win against Valencia at the Mestalla, in his third match of that season. On each occasion he had replaced the absent Zoltán Czibor. He played infrequently during that season, and not at all in the first half of the next. After Barcelona's 5–2 European Cup win at English champions Wolverhampton Wanderers in March 1960, in which he should have opened the scoring but shot wildly with the goalkeeper out of position, La Vanguardia reported that the English could not understand how a player like Coll could be used so sparingly. He kept his place for the rest of that season, played in both legs of the European Cup semi-final as Barcelona were eliminated by Real Madrid, and scored one goal and set up another as Barcelona defeated Birmingham City in the 1960 Fairs Cup Final to win the competition for the second time.

An operation on a twisted knee suffered against Real Valladolid in September restricted Coll's appearances in the last of his five years with the club. In 1957, El Mundo Deportivo's reporter had suggested that with application he might end up as Barcelona's outside left, but in the event, his primary role had been as backup to Tejada and Czibor. His obituary in the same newspaper made clear that when Helenio Herrera did place his trust in him, he did not disappoint.

In June 1961, Coll signed for Valencia. Two weeks later, the car in which he was travelling was in collision with a lorry carrying fizzy drinks. His injuries were minor; his teammate, Walter, who was driving the car, was killed. Coll first appeared for Valencia on the ninth matchday, tried in place of Ficha, in a goalless draw against Elche. He kept his place for the next game, scoring Valencia's second goal in a 3–2 defeat at Racing Santander, and followed up with a goal in a 2–1 win against Sevilla, in which ABC's reporter assessed Valencia's two wing-men – Ficha had returned on the other wing – as the pick of the bunch. This established him as a regular starter, and he played in both legs of the 1961–62 Fairs Cup semi-final, in which Valencia beat MTK Hungaria 10–3 on aggregate, but not in the final against Barcelona, which did not take place until September. He played only four first-team games in the 1962–63 season, the highlight being two goals against Celtic in the Fairs Cup.

He went on to play for Granada and Olot, and coached for a season at Figueres. The following season, he was technical director of the youth squad at his former club Girona, and from 24 March 1976 took charge of the first team for the rest of the season after the departure of Emilio Aldecoa.

Coll died in Salt, Girona, on 8 January 2008, aged 70.

== International ==
Coll was capped for Spain under-21s, in a 3–0 friendly defeat against Italy in March 1960. In May, he was selected in a 32-man squad from which two teams were selected: one for a full international against England and the other for a 'B' international against the senior Morocco team. Though Coll was touted for the full side, in the event he played for the B-team, in a 3–3 draw in Casablanca.

== Honours ==
Barcelona

- Copa del Generalísimo: 1957, 1958–59
- La Liga: 1958–59, 1959–60
- Inter-Cities Fairs Cup: 1958–60

Valencia

- Inter-Cities Fairs Cup: 1961–62, 1962–63
