= 1959 Copa del Generalísimo final =

Copa del Generalísimo 1959 final
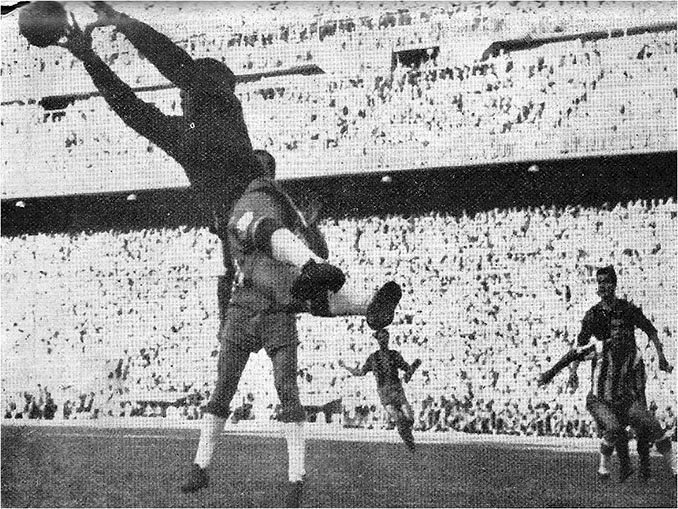
- A moment of the match
- Event: 1958–59 Copa del Generalísimo
Barcelona	Granada
4	1
- Date: 21 June 1959
- Venue: Santiago Bernabéu, Madrid
- Referee: Manuel Asensi
- Attendance: 90,000

The Copa del Generalísimo 1959 final was the 57th final of the King's Cup. The final was played at Santiago Bernabéu Stadium in Madrid, on 21 June 1959, being won by CF Barcelona, who beat Granada CF 4–1.

== Match details ==
21 June 1959
18:45 CET

Barcelona	4–1	Granada
E. Martínez 2'; Kocsis 10', 76'; Tejada 67'	Report (in Spanish)	Carranza 58'

Santiago Bernabéu, Madrid
Attendance: 90,000
Referee: Manuel Asensi

Barcelona

Granada

GK	1	(Spain) Pedro Estrems
DF	2	(Spain) Ferran Olivella
DF	3	(Spain) Rodri
DF	4	(Spain) Sígfrid Gràcia
MF	5	(Spain) Enric Gensana
MF	6	(Spain) Joan Segarra (c)
FW	7	(Spain) Justo Tejada
FW	8	(Hungary) Sándor Kocsis
FW	9	(Paraguay) Eulogio Martínez
FW	10	(Spain) Luis Suárez
FW	11	(Uruguay) Ramón Villaverde
Manager:
(Argentina) Helenio Herrera

GK	1	(Spain) Rafael Piris
DF	2	(Spain) José Becerril
DF	3	(Spain) Vicente Díaz (c)
DF	4	(Spain) Manuel Larrabeiti
MF	5	(Spain) Ramoní
MF	6	(Argentina) José María Pellejero
FW	7	(Spain) Juan Vázquez
FW	8	(Argentina) Ramón Carranza
FW	9	(Spain) Loren
FW	10	(Argentina) Juan Armando Benavídez
FW	11	(Spain) Arsenio Iglesias
Manager:
(Hungary) Jenő Kalmár
