= Sígfrid Gràcia =

Spanish footballer

Personal information
- Full name: Sígfrid Gràcia Royo
- Date of birth: 27 March 1932
- Place of birth: Gavà, Spain
- Date of death: 23 May 2005 (aged 73)
- Place of death: Gavà, Spain
- Position: Defender

Youth career
- Barcelona

Senior career*
Years	Team	Apps	(Gls)
1949–1966	Barcelona	229	(5)
1949–1952	→ CD Condal (loan)		
1953–1954	→ CD Condal (loan)	10	(0)
1954–1955	→ CD Condal (loan)	3	(0)

International career
1956	Spain B	1	(0)
1959–1962	Spain	10	(0)
1951–1960	Catalan XI	4	(2)
- * Club domestic league appearances and goals

Sígfrid Gràcia Royo (27 March 1932 – 23 May 2005) was a Spanish footballer who played as a defender.

== Club career ==
Born in Gavà, Barcelona, Catalonia, Gràcia spent his entire 17-year professional career with FC Barcelona, safe for a three-year loan at neighbouring CD Condal and parts of two seasons in the same predicament, with the same team. He made his La Liga debut with the former on 14 September 1952, in a 4–3 home win against Deportivo de La Coruña.

From 1955 to 1962, Gràcia never played less than 25 league games, winning six of his 11 major titles with the Blaugrana. Viewed as a no-nonsense and consistent defender, he appeared in 526 competitive matches during his spell with his main club (21 goals scored), retiring in 1966 at the age of 34.

== International career ==
Gràcia won ten caps for the Spain national team, during slightly less than three years. His first came on 28 June 1959 in a 4–2 win over Poland for the 1960 European Nations' Cup qualifiers, and he was selected for the squad that competed at the 1962 FIFA World Cup, appearing against Mexico and Brazil in an eventual group stage exit.

== Honours ==
- La Liga: 1952–53, 1958–59, 1959–60
- Copa del Generalísimo: 1952–53, 1957, 1958–59, 1962–63
- Copa Eva Duarte: 1952
- Inter-Cities Fairs Cup: 1955–58, 1958–60, 1965–66
