= 1958 Inter-Cities Fairs Cup final =

- Event: 1955–58 Inter-Cities Fairs Cup
| London XI | Barcelona XI |
| (England) | (Spain) |
| 2 | 8 |
- on aggregate

First leg
| London XI | Barcelona XI |
| 2 | 2 |
- Date: 5 March 1958
- Venue: Stamford Bridge, London
- Referee: Albert Dusch (West Germany)
- Attendance: 45,466

Second leg
| Barcelona XI | London XI |
| 6 | 0 |
- Date: 1 May 1958
- Venue: Camp Nou, Barcelona
- Referee: Albert Dusch (West Germany)
- Attendance: 70,000

The 1958 Inter-Cities Fairs Cup final was the final of the first Inter-Cities Fairs Cup. It was played on 5 March and 1 May 1958 between London XI of England and Barcelona XI (represented by Barcelona). Barcelona XI won the tie 8–2 on aggregate.

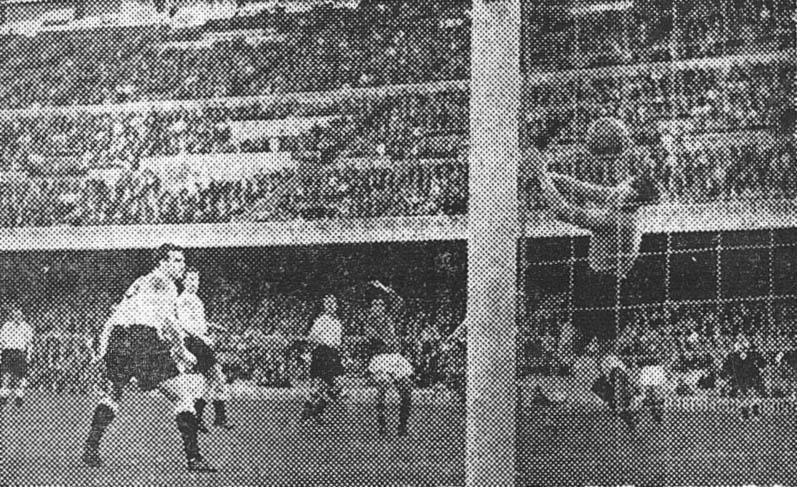
Barcelona XI scoring the fourth goal in the eventual 6–0 win that secured the series

== Match details ==
=== First leg ===
5 March 1958

| London XI (England) | 2–2 | (Spain) Barcelona XI |
|---|---|---|
| Greaves 10'; Langley 88' (pen.) | | Martínez 7'; Tejada 35' |

Stamford Bridge, London
Attendance: 45,466
Referee: Albert Dusch (West Germany)

| London XI | Barcelona XI |

| GK | 1 | (Wales) Jack Kelsey |
| RB | 2 | (England) Peter Sillett |
| LB | 3 | (England) Jim Langley |
| RH | 4 | (Northern Ireland) Danny Blanchflower |
| CH | 5 | (England) Maurice Norman |
| LH | 6 | (England) Ken Coote |
| OR | 7 | (England) Vic Groves |
| IR | 8 | (England) Jimmy Greaves |
| CF | 9 | (England) Bobby Smith |
| IL | 10 | (England) Johnny Haynes |
| OL | 11 | (England) George Robb |
Manager:
(England) not known

GK | 1 | (Spain) Pedro Estrems
(Spain) Ferran Olivella
(Spain) Joan Segarra
(Spain) Martí Vergés
(Spain) Enric Gensana
(Spain) Enric Ribelles
(Spain) Estanislau Basora
(Brazil) Evaristo
(Paraguay) Eulogio Martínez
(Uruguay) Ramón Villaverde
(Spain) Justo Tejada
Manager:
(Spain) Domènec Balmanya

=== Second leg ===
1 May 1958

| Barcelona XI (Spain) | 6–0 | (England) London XI |
|---|---|---|
| Suárez 6', 8'; Martínez 42'; Evaristo 52', 75'; Vergés 63' |

Camp Nou, Barcelona
Attendance: 70,000
Referee: Albert Dusch (West Germany)

| Barcelona XI | London XI |

GK | 1 | (Spain) Antoni Ramallets
(Spain) Ferran Olivella
(Spain) Joan Segarra
(Spain) Martí Vergés
(Spain) Joaquin Brugue
(Spain) Enric Gensana
(Spain) Justo Tejada
(Brazil) Evaristo
(Paraguay) Eulogio Martínez
(Spain) Luis Suárez
(Spain) Estanislau Basora
Manager:
(Argentina) Helenio Herrera

GK | 1 | (Wales) Jack Kelsey
(England) George Wright
(Republic of Ireland) Noel Cantwell
(Northern Ireland) Danny Blanchflower
(England) Ken Brown
(Wales) Dave Bowen
(Wales) Terry Medwin
(England) Vic Groves
(England) Bobby Smith
(England) Jimmy Bloomfield
(England) Jim Lewis
Manager:
(England) Jack Crayston

== See also ==
- 1955–58 Inter-Cities Fairs Cup
- FC Barcelona in international football competitions
