= Rodri (footballer, born 1934) =

Spanish footballer (1934–2022)

Personal information
- Full name: Francisco Rodríguez García
- Date of birth: 8 March 1934
- Place of birth: Barcelona, Spain
- Date of death: 17 May 2022 (aged 88)
- Place of death: Spain
- Position: Defender

Youth career
- 1951–1954: Barcelona

Senior career*
Years	Team	Apps	(Gls)
1954–1956	España Industrial	37	(0)
1956–1958	Condal	62	(0)
1958–1966	Barcelona	82	(0)
1964	→ Gimnàstic (loan)	10	(0)
Total		191	(0)

International career
1959	Spain B	1	(0)
1962	Spain	4	(0)

Managerial career
- 1966–1969: Barcelona (youth)
- 1969–1970: Condal
- 1970–1976: Barcelona (assistant)
- 1983: Catalonia (youth)
- 1986–1989: Catalonia (youth)
- * Club domestic league appearances and goals

Francisco Rodríguez García (8 March 1934 – 17 May 2022), known as Rodri, was a Spanish footballer who played as a defender.

== Club career ==
Rodri was born in Barcelona, Catalonia. After having already played his youth football at the club, he signed for FC Barcelona in 1958 from neighbours CD Condal. He totalled 48 games over his first two seasons, in which La Liga was won, but appeared in only nine matches in his last four.

Rodri made his debut in the top division with Condal, in a 6–0 away loss against Real Madrid on 9 September 1956, with the campaign ending in relegation. He left Barcelona in 1966 at the age of 32, retiring shortly after; he acted as assistant manager at his main team for six years, mostly under Rinus Michels.

== International career ==
Rodri earned four caps for Spain in 1962, and was included in the squad for that year's FIFA World Cup. In the tournament in Chile, he appeared in a 1–0 win over Mexico and a 2–1 defeat to Brazil in a group-stage exit.

== Death ==
Rodri died on 17 May 2022, aged 88.

== Honours ==
Barcelona

- La Liga: 1958–59, 1959–60
- Copa del Generalísimo: 1958–59, 1962–63
- Inter-Cities Fairs Cup: 1958–60
