= Enric Ribelles =

Spanish footballer

Personal information
- Full name: Enric Ribelles Seró
- Date of birth: 1 February 1934
- Place of birth: Puigverd de Lleida, Spain
- Date of death: 19 March 2014 (aged 80)
- Place of death: Puigverd de Lleida, Spain
- Position: Midfielder

Youth career
- Puigvertenc
- Juneda
- Almacelles
- Balaguer

Senior career*
Years	Team	Apps	(Gls)
1951–1956	Lleida	88	(14)
1952–1954	→ Binéfar (loan)		
1956–1961	Barcelona	37	(7)
1956–1957	→ Lleida (loan)	31	(12)
1961–1965	Valencia	59	(9)
1965–1966	Lleida	23	(5)
1966–1967	Juneda		

International career
1958–1960	Spain B	2	(1)
1957–1960	Catalonia	2	(0)
- * Club domestic league appearances and goals

Enric Ribelles Seró (1 February 1934 – 19 March 2014) was a Spanish footballer who played as a midfielder.

He amassed La Liga totals of 96 games and 16 goals over the course of eight seasons, with Barcelona and Valencia.

== Football career ==
Born in Puigverd de Lleida, Lleida, Catalonia, Ribelles' professional career was solely associated to FC Barcelona and Valencia CF. He arrived at the former in 1956 from local UE Lleida, making his La Liga debut on 15 December of the following year in a 1–1 away draw against Real Zaragoza.

With Barça Ribelles, overshadowed in his position by László Kubala, played 78 games all competitions comprised and scored 20 goals, winning five major trophies including two national championships and as many Inter-Cities Fairs Cups. Subsequently he joined Valencia CF, where he remained a further four seasons and won another two Fairs Cups, notably netting in a 6–2 home routing of former team Barcelona in the 1961–62 edition (7–3 on aggregate).

== Honours ==
Barcelona

- Inter-Cities Fairs Cup: 1955–58, 1958–60
- La Liga: 1958–59, 1959–60
- Copa del Generalísimo: 1958–59

Valencia

- Inter-Cities Fairs Cup: 1961–62, 1962–63

== Death ==
Ribelles died in his hometown on 19 March 2014, at the age of 80.
