= Martí Vergés =

Spanish footballer (1934–2021)

Personal information
- Full name: Martí Vergés Massa
- Date of birth: 8 March 1934
- Place of birth: Vidreres, Spain
- Date of death: 17 February 2021 (aged 86)
- Position: Midfielder

Youth career
- Vidreres
- 1950–1954: Barcelona

Senior career*
Years	Team	Apps	(Gls)
1954–1956	España Industrial		
1956–1966	Barcelona	188	(15)

International career
1955	Spain amateur	3	(0)
1956–1958	Spain B	4	(0)
1957–1962	Spain	12	(2)
1956–1960	Catalan XI	3	(1)
- * Club domestic league appearances and goals

Martí Vergés Massa, usually known as "Martín Vergés" (8 March 1934 – 17 February 2021), was a Spanish footballer. He played as a midfielder for Barcelona and earned 12 caps for the Spain national football team between 1957 and 1962, scoring two goals; he was included in their 1962 FIFA World Cup squad. He died nineteen days short of his 87th birthday.

== Honours ==
Barcelona

- Inter-Cities Fairs Cup: 1955–58, 1958–60, 1965–66
- Spanish League: 1958–59, 1959–60
- Spanish Cup: 1956–57, 1958–59, 1962–63

Individual

- World XI: 1960
