= Birmingham City F.C. in European football =

English club in European football

- Club: Birmingham City
- Seasons played: 5
- First entry: 1955–58 Inter-Cities Fairs Cup
- Latest entry: 2011–12 UEFA Europa League

Birmingham City Football Club is an English professional football club based in Birmingham. The club's involvement in European competition dates back to the 1950s.

Invitations to enter the Inter-Cities Fairs Cup, a football tournament set up to promote industrial trade fairs, were extended to the city hosting the trade fair rather than to clubs. Some cities entered a select team including players from more than one club, but Aston Villa, the other major club based in the city of Birmingham, rejected the opportunity to field a combined team. Thus Birmingham City became the first English club side to play in European competition when they played their first match in the 1955–58 Inter-Cities Fairs Cup on 15 May 1956. They were also the first English club side to reach a European final, the 1960 Fairs Cup final, in which they met Barcelona. The home leg, a goalless draw, was played on 29 March 1960 and the away leg, which Barcelona won 4–1, some six weeks later. (Note: The London XI, including players from several London clubs, were the first English team to play in European competition when they played their first match in the inaugural Fairs Cup in 1955, and the first English team to reach a final, in the same campaign.) In the semifinal of the 1961 Fairs Cup Birmingham beat Internazionale home and away; no other English club beat them in a competitive match in the San Siro until Arsenal did so in the Champions League more than 40 years later.

Victory in the 2011 Football League Cup Final earned Birmingham qualification for the 2011–12 UEFA Europa League, which they entered at the play-off round. A 3–0 aggregate victory over C.D. Nacional of Portugal qualified Birmingham for the group stage, in which they were drawn alongside last season's finalists, S.C. Braga of Portugal, Slovenian champions NK Maribor, and fourth-placed Belgian team Club Brugge. They finished third in group H, one point behind Club Brugge and Braga, so failed to qualify for the knockout rounds.

== Overall record ==
=== Record by season ===
Birmingham City's scores are given first in all scorelines.

Season	Competition	Round	Opponent		Home leg	Away leg	Play- off	Notes	Refs
Season	Competition	Round	Country	Club	Home leg	Away leg	Play- off	Notes	Refs
1955–58	Inter-Cities Fairs Cup	GS	Italy	Internazionale	2–1	0–0		(Note: Invitations to enter the Inter-Cities Fairs Cup, a football tournament set up to promote industrial trade fairs, were extended to the city hosting the trade fair rather than to clubs. Some cities entered a select team including players from more than one club; others, including Birmingham, chose a club side to represent them.)	
1955–58	Inter-Cities Fairs Cup	GS	Yugoslavia	Zagreb XI	3–0	1–0			
1955–58	Inter-Cities Fairs Cup	SF	Spain	Barcelona	4–3	0–1	1–2	(Note: The away goals rule did not apply when aggregate scores were level, so a playoff was staged at St. Jakob-Park, Basel, which Barcelona won 2–1 to reach the final.)	
1958–60	Inter-Cities Fairs Cup	1R	Germany	Cologne XI	2–0	2–2		(Note: Until the mid-1960s, entry to this competition remained by invitation, independent of domestic league position. Birmingham City's continued invitations resulted from their success in the previous edition of the competition. In 1961–62, there was an expanded entry of 28 teams, and Birmingham received a bye to the second round as losing finalist from the previous edition.)	
1958–60	Inter-Cities Fairs Cup	2R	Yugoslavia	Zagreb XI	1–0	3–3			
1958–60	Inter-Cities Fairs Cup	SF	Belgium	Union Saint-Gilloise	4–2	4–2			
1958–60	Inter-Cities Fairs Cup	F	Spain	Barcelona	0–0	1–4			
1960–61	Inter-Cities Fairs Cup	1R	Hungary	Újpesti Dózsa	3–2	2–1			
1960–61	Inter-Cities Fairs Cup	2R	Denmark	KB	5–0	4–4			
1960–61	Inter-Cities Fairs Cup	SF	Italy	Internazionale	2–1	2–1			
1960–61	Inter-Cities Fairs Cup	F	Italy	A.S. Roma	2–2	0–2			
1961–62	Inter-Cities Fairs Cup	2R	Spain	RCD Espanyol	1–0	2–5			
2011–12	UEFA Europa League	PO	Portugal	C.D. Nacional	3–0	0–0			
2011–12	UEFA Europa League	GS	Portugal	S.C. Braga	1–3	0–1			
2011–12	UEFA Europa League	GS	Slovenia	NK Maribor	1–0	2–1			
2011–12	UEFA Europa League	GS	Belgium	Club Brugge	2–2	2–1			

Key

- PO = play-off round
- GS = group stage
- 1R = first round
- 2R = second round
- SF = semifinal
- F = final

=== Record by nation ===
Nation	Pld	W	D	L	GF	GA	GD	Opponents
Belgium	4	3	1	0	12	7	+5	Union Saint-Gilloise, Club Brugge
Denmark	2	1	1	0	9	4	+5	KB
Germany	2	1	1	0	4	2	+2	Cologne XI
Hungary	2	2	0	0	5	3	+2	Újpest
Italy	6	3	2	1	8	7	+1	Inter, Roma
Portugal	4	1	1	2	4	4	0	Nacional, Braga
Slovenia	2	2	0	0	3	1	+2	Maribor
Spain	7	2	1	4	9	15	-6	Barcelona, Espanyol
Yugoslavia	4	3	1	0	8	3	+5	Zagreb XI

== European attendance records ==
- Highest home attendance: 40,524, against Barcelona, 1960 Fairs Cup final first leg, 29 March 1960.
- Lowest home attendance: 14,152, against Union Saint-Gilloise, 1958–60 Fairs Cup semifinal second leg, 11 November 1959.
- Highest away attendance: 75,000, against Barcelona, 1958–60 Fairs Cup final second leg, 4 May 1960.
- Lowest away attendance: 2,500, against KB, 1960–61 Fairs Cup second round first leg, 23 November 1960.
