= Enric Gensana =

Spanish footballer (1936–2005)

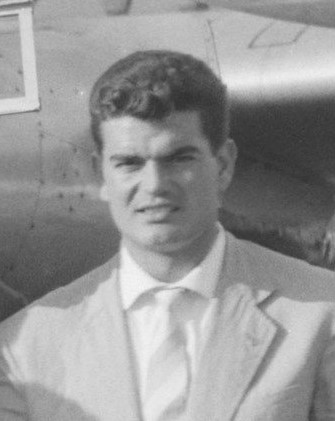
- Enric Gensana in 1960

Personal information
- Full name: Enric Gensana Merola
- Date of birth: 3 June 1936
- Place of birth: Lleida, Spain
- Date of death: 28 September 2005 (aged 69)
- Place of death: Barcelona, Spain
- Position: Center back

Youth career
- Lleida

Senior career*
Years	Team	Apps	(Gls)
1954–1956	Lleida	20	(0)
1956–1966	Barcelona	131	(13)
1965	→ Osasuna (loan)	8	(1)
1965–1966	→ Condal (loan)	15	(0)
1966–1967	Condal	10	(1)

International career
1956–1958	Spain B	4	(0)
1957–1961	Spain	10	(2)
- * Club domestic league appearances and goals

Enric Gensana Merola (3 June 1936 – 28 September 2005) was a Spanish footballer. He was an important player for FC Barcelona at the end of the fifties and beginning of the sixties. A very physical player, he spent eight seasons at the club and only a meniscus injury, which he never recovered from, forced him to leave.

== Career ==
Born in Lleida, Catalonia, Gensana began to play football in the youth ranks of UE Lleida, the team with which he made his debut in the Second Division and where he played along Gonzalvo III, Basora and Moreno, who gave very good reports of him to Barça's technical staff. He signed for Barça in 1956 and in the same year the team won the Cup and he made his debut with the national team. His debut with UE Lleida was on 3 April 1955 at the age of 19 in a Second Division game between UE Lleida and España Industrial (1–4).

Gensana's main personal achievement was that being elected the best player of the Little World Cup held in Caracas, ahead of his teammate Segarra and of players like Garrincha or Didí. His successful career was truncated by the above-mentioned meniscus injury, which caused his transfer to Osasuna in 1964 and one year later to Condal, where he retired in 1967. Capped 10 times, Gensana made his debut with the national team in May 1957 against Scotland in Madrid and said goodbye in May 1961 also in the capital of Spain, against Wales.

== International goals ==
#	Date	Venue	Opponent	Score	Result	Competition
1.	14 October 1959	Santiago Bernabéu, Madrid, Spain	Poland	2–0	3–0	1960 European Nations' Cup Round of 16
2.	2 April 1961	Santiago Bernabéu, Madrid, Spain	France	1–0	2–0	International Friendly

== Honours ==
FC Barcelona

- Inter-Cities Fairs Cup: 1955–58, 1958–60
- Spanish League: 1958–59, 1959–60
- Spanish Cup: 1957, 1958–59, 1962–63
