= Enric Rabassa =

Spanish football manager (1920–1980)

Personal information
- Full name: Josep Enric Rabassa Llompart
- Date of birth: 19 April 1920
- Place of birth: Barcelona, Spain
- Date of death: 29 December 1980 (aged 60)
- Place of death: Barcelona, Spain

Senior career*
| Years | Team | Apps | (Gls) |
- Sants
- Badalona
- Sant Celoni
- Sant Sadurní

Managerial career
- 1953–1954: Pueblo Seco
- 1955–1958: Barcelona (youth)
- 1958–1960: Barcelona (assistant)
- 1960: Barcelona
- 1960–1961: Condal
- 1961–1962: Tenerife
- 1962: Deportivo La Coruña
- 1963–1964: Hospitalet
- 1965–1966: Atlético Baleares
- 1968–1969: Reus
- * Club domestic league appearances and goals

Josep Enric Rabassa Llompart (19 April 1920 – 29 December 1980) was a Spanish football player and coach best known for winning the 1960 Inter-Cities Fairs Cup with FC Barcelona.
