= Joan Segarra =

Spanish footballer

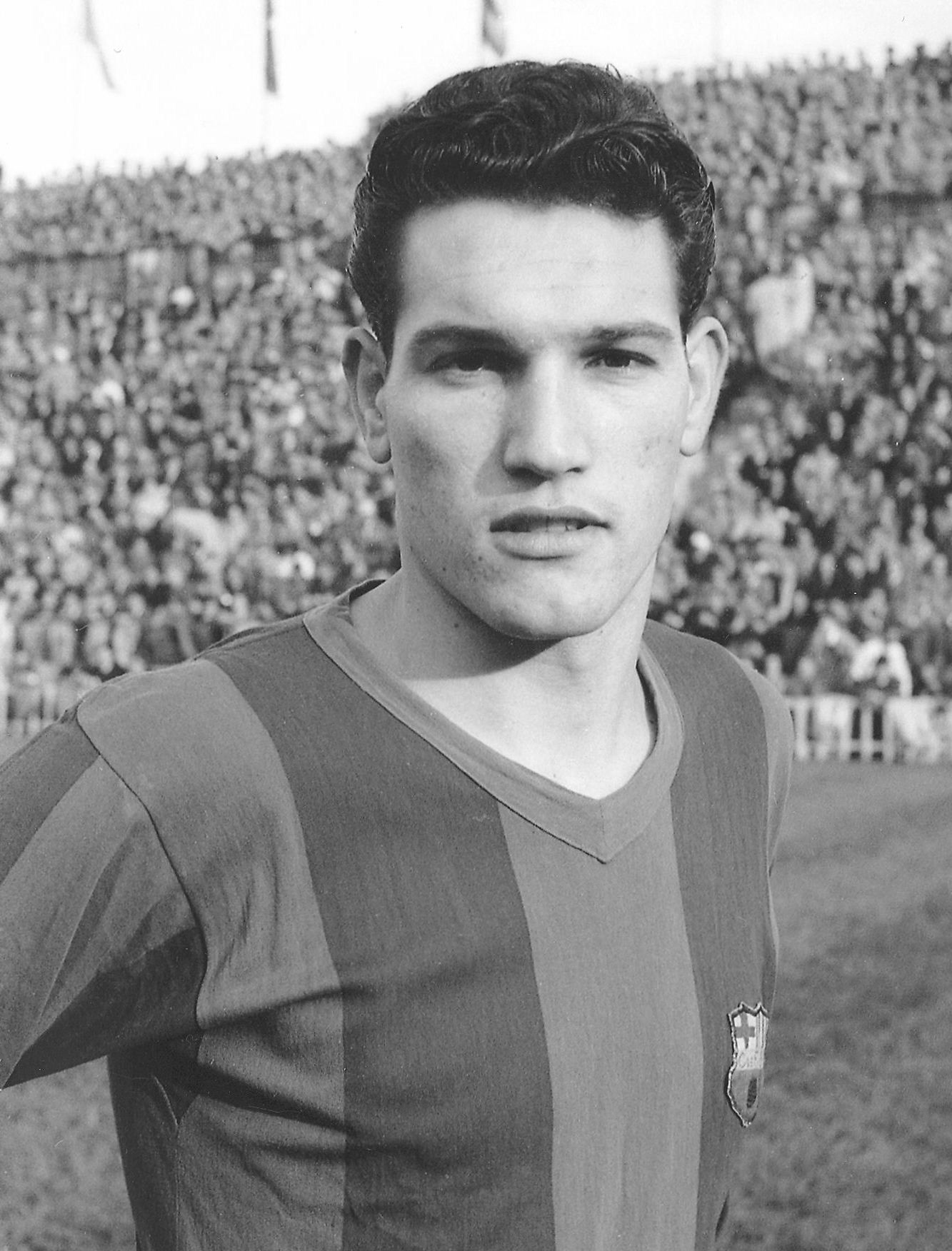

Personal information
- Full name: Joan Segarra Iracheta
- Date of birth: 15 November 1927
- Place of birth: Barcelona, Spain
- Date of death: 3 September 2008 (aged 80)
- Place of death: Taradell, Spain
- Height: 1.75 m (5 ft 9 in)
- Position: Defender

Youth career
- Sansense
- San Pol

Senior career*
Years	Team	Apps	(Gls)
- Vilafranca
1949–1964	Barcelona	299	(17)

International career
1953–1955	Spain B	3	(0)
1951–1962	Spain	25	(0)
1954–1958	Catalan XI	3	(0)

Managerial career
- 1972–1973: Vilafranca
- 1973–1974: Figueres
- 1974–1975: Vic
- 1975–1976: Mahonés
- 1977–1979: Barcelona B (assistant)
- 1979–1980: Barcelona B
- 1980–1981: Barcelona (assistant)
- * Club domestic league appearances and goals

Joan Segarra Iracheta (15 November 1927 – 3 September 2008) was a Spanish footballer who played as a defender. He spent 16 seasons with FC Barcelona between 1950 and 1964, in which he played 299 matches in La Liga and served as the team's captain for multiple years. He is ranked fifth among all players, by number of starts, in the history of Barcelona.

After retirement, Segarra stayed on as a youth team coach, eventually becoming first team assistant coach to Helenio Herrera.

== Honours ==
FC Barcelona

- Inter-Cities Fairs Cup: 1955–58, 1958–60
- Latin Cup: 1952
- Small Club World Cup: 1957
- Spanish League: 1951–52, 1952–53, 1958–59, 1959–60
- Spanish Cup: 1950–51, 1951–52, 1952–53, 1956–57, 1958–59, 1962–63
- Eva Duarte Cup: 1952, 1953
