= Ángel Suárez Martínez =

Spanish footballer (1939–2014)

Personal information
- Full name: Ángel Suárez Martínez
- Date of birth: 28 June 1939
- Place of birth: Aljucer, Murcia, Spain
- Date of death: 29 June 2014 (aged 75)
- Place of death: Barcelona, Catalonia, Spain
- Positions: Midfielder; central defender

Senior career*
Years	Team	Apps	(Gls)
1957–1958	Puig-reig		
1958–1959	Condal	5	(2)
1959–1960	Gimnàstic de Tarragona	24	(7)
1960–1962	Cartagena	64	(40)
1962–1966	Real Betis	12	(0)
1962–1963	→ Cádiz (loan)	30	(0)
1966–1969	Celta de Vigo	10	(0)
1967–1968	→ Badajoz (loan)	28	(5)
1969–1970	Oro		
1970–1972	Jalisco		
- * Club domestic league appearances and goals

Ángel Suárez Martínez Comtal (28 June 1939 – 29 June 2014) was a Spanish football player and referee. Nicknamed "Panocha", he played for a variety of Spanish clubs throughout the 1960s such as Real Betis and Celta de Vigo. He also played abroad in the Liga MX for Oro throughout the early 1970s.

== Career ==
Moving to Barcelona at a young age, Suárez Martínez began his career with Puig-reig before playing for Condal, making 5 appearances and scoring 7 goals in unofficial matches. Following a brief stints with Gimnàstic de Tarragona, he returned to Murcia to play for Cartagena where he was the top scorer for the club in the 1960–61 season. He then found himself with Real Betis but was positioned as a central defender which resulted in him not making any appearances. This would then result in Suárez Martínez being loaned out to Cádiz, making 12 appearances. A notable incident throughout his brief stint with Cadiz would occur during a game against Las Palmas where, following a decision, resulted in Suárez Martínez attempting to attack the referee which resulted in a six-game suspension. Following his return to Betis, he was part of the squad that won the 1964 Ramón de Carranza Trophy as he was considered to be one of the most successful players of the team. He then played for Celta de Vigo, making 10 overall games following a brief loan to Celta de Vigo. He then spent his final seasons abroad in the Liga MX for Oro until his retirement following the 1971–72 season.

== Personal life ==
Suárez Martínez died on 29 June 2014 in Barcelona after living in Mexico City for a long period of time serving as a referee within Mexico.
