= Filippo Tasso =

Italian footballer (1940–2021)

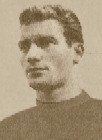
- 1950

Personal information
- Date of birth: 26 August 1940
- Place of birth: Milan, Italy
- Date of death: 17 December 2021 (aged 81)
- Place of death: Modena, Italy
- Position: Striker

Senior career*
Years	Team	Apps	(Gls)
1958–1959	Roma	3	(2)
1959–1960	Sambenedettese	27	(8)
1960–1962	Taranto		
1962–1963	Lecce	27	
1963–1964	Monza	12	(1)
1964–1965	Palermo	4	(0)
1965–1966	Piacenza	31	
- * Club domestic league appearances and goals

Filippo Tasso (26 August 1940 – 17 December 2021) was an Italian professional footballer who played as a striker.

He played one season in the Serie A, in 1958–59, when he played three games and scored two games for A.S. Roma. He also played for Roma in the 1958–60 Inter-Cities Fairs Cup and scored two goals in their first round matchup against the German club Hannover 96.

Tasso died on 17 December 2021, at the age of 81.
