= Evaristo (footballer) =

Brazilian footballer and coach (born 1933)

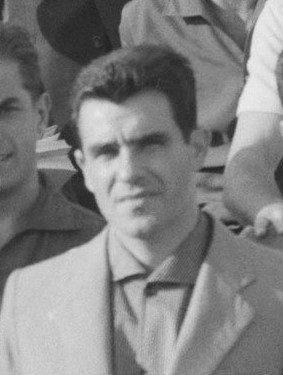
- Evaristo in 1960

Personal information
- Full name: Evaristo de Macedo Filho
- Date of birth: 22 June 1933 (age 93)
- Place of birth: Rio de Janeiro, Brazil
- Height: 1.75 m (5 ft 9 in)
- Position: Forward

Senior career*
Years	Team	Apps	(Gls)
1950–1952	Madureira	35	(18)
1953–1957	Flamengo	61	(38)
1957–1962	Barcelona	114	(78)
1962–1965	Real Madrid	17	(4)
1965–1966	Flamengo	7	(0)
Total		234	(138)

International career
1955–1957	Brazil	14	(8)

Managerial career
- 1967–1968: America
- 1968: Fluminense
- 1969: Vasco da Gama
- 1971: Bahia
- 1971: Bangu
- 1972: Santa Cruz
- 1973: Bahia
- 1977–1979: Santa Cruz
- 1980–1986: Qatar
- 1985: America
- 1985: Brazil
- 1986: Iraq
- 1988–1989: Bahia
- 1990: Grêmio
- 1991–1992: Cruzeiro
- 1992: Qatar
- 1993: Santos
- 1993–1995: Flamengo
- 1996: Atlético Paranaense
- 1997: Grêmio
- 1997: Vitória
- 1998: Bahia
- 1998: Flamengo
- 1999: Corinthians
- 2001: Bahia
- 2002: Vasco da Gama
- 2002–2003: Flamengo
- 2003: Bahia
- 2004: Vitória
- 2005: Atlético Paranaense
- 2007: Santa Cruz
- * Club domestic league appearances and goals

Evaristo de Macedo Filho (born 22 June 1933), known simply as Evaristo, is a Brazilian former footballer and coach.

== Club career ==
=== Madureira (1950–1952) ===
Raised in the north of Rio de Janeiro, Evaristo, like many children, played football simply for fun on the streets, and watched Flamengo play on weekends with his uncle. In 1950, aged 17, Evaristo joined a friend who was attending a trial at Madureira and was asked to come back the following day. Signed as an amateur, he scored 18 goals in 35 games, including one against Fluminense at the Maracanã Stadium.

=== Flamengo (1953–1957) ===
Evaristo was called up to the Brazilian squad at the 1952 Summer Olympics in Helsinki. After returning home following elimination to an experienced Germany side, all of the Brazil players received new club offers. Turning down offers from Vasco da Gama and Fluminense, Evaristo joined Flamengo, and won three successive Rio State Championships with the club. He scored 103 goals in 191 games for Flamengo, including four during a 12–2 win over São Cristóvão, the biggest win ever recorded at the Maracanã to date.

=== Barcelona (1957–1962) ===
Evaristo's five-goal display with Brazil in a 9–0 win over Colombia at the 1957 South American Championship brought him to the attention of Barcelona technical secretary Josep Samitier, who had flown to South America in search of a striker. Samitier watched Evaristo playing for Brazil during qualification for the 1958 FIFA World Cup and, impressed, made Evaristo's father a proposal deemed "impossible to turn down", with a basic wage of 700,000 pesetas/£6,000 a year (about £140,000 in 2021). The offer came additionally including a house, a Mercedes-Benz and a club liaison officer who assisted with Evaristo's marriage to his childhood sweetheart Norma three months later. Each player had an individual fan club arranged by the club, but the players outside of training and official activity were free to enjoy life and relax in the city.

Playing in a Barcelona side alongside László Kubala and Luis Suárez, and managed by Helenio Herrera, Evaristo scored in the first official match played at the Camp Nou in September 1957, and became the first player to score a hat-trick at the ground. In the following season, he scored three goals against European champions Real Madrid en route to Barcelona's first La Liga title in six years. On 23 November 1960, in the second leg of a European Cup tie against Real Madrid at the Camp Nou, during which the English referee ruled out four separate goals for Real Madrid, Evaristo scored a diving header with eight minutes to go, which eliminated Barcelona's rivals from the competition for the first time and ended their hopes of a sixth successive title. Evaristo scored six times during Barcelona's run to their first European Cup final, which they lost 3–2 to Benfica at the Wankdorf Stadium in Bern, now remembered as the "Square-Posts Final" due to the match supposedly being the reason the shape of the goalposts was changed.

During Evaristo's time with Barcelona, the club won two league titles, a cup title, and two Inter-Cities Fairs Cups. Barcelona's statistics department state that in official matches, Evaristo scored 105 goals in 151 games for the side, while the club's official site states in total he scored 181 in 237. Only Rivaldo, who scored 129 goals in 235 games between 1997 and 2002, has more official goals by a Brazilian for Barcelona than Evaristo; Evaristo however still retains the best goals-per-game ratio of any Brazilian to play more than 50 games for Barcelona.

Evaristo's relationship with Barcelona with regards to international representation had been strained from the start. Having played every minute of a two-legged World Cup qualifier against Peru, and with eight goals in fourteen games, when they signed him Barcelona verbally agreed to release Evaristo for the World Cup final tournament in Sweden. However, with Spain having failed to qualify, the Spanish Cup went ahead at the same time as the tournament in Sweden, and Barcelona went back on their promise to release him. Brazil went on to win their first World Cup, with 17-year-old Pelé their headlining player; Evaristo would never wear the famous Brazilian yellow shirt again.

=== Real Madrid (1962–1965) ===
In 1962, wanting to sign another foreign player – yet with rules only allowing one per team under both Spanish and European rules – Barcelona asked Evaristo to naturalise as a Spanish citizen. After bitter wrangling, Evaristo agreed to quit Barcelona that summer. Although he had offers from clubs in both France and Italy, and with his family happy in Spain, Evaristo agreed to join rivals Real Madrid. In contrast to the transfer of Luís Figo 38 years later, Barcelona's fans directed their anger not at the player, but at the board. Despite a serious knee injury limiting him to just nineteen appearances and six goals for Real Madrid, Evaristo still won two La Liga titles in two seasons with the club.

=== Return to Flamengo (1965–1966) ===
Evaristo returned as he had planned to Flamengo in 1965, adding another league title before retiring a year later, at the age of 33.

== International career ==
Evaristo competed for Brazil at the 1952 Summer Olympics, alongside other notable players such as Vavá and Zózimo.

Evaristo was capped by the national side fourteen times, scoring eight goals. He also holds the record of most goals for the Brazil national team in a single match, with Evaristo netting five times for the Seleção in a 9–0 win over Colombia in 1957.

Evaristo played every minute of Brazil's two-legged 1958 World Cup qualifying tie against Peru, and with a total of eight goals in fourteen matches played, he was expected to be a starter for Brazil at the final tournament in Sweden. However, with Spain failing to qualify, the Spanish Cup went ahead at the same time as the World Cup, and Barcelona went back on their initial promise to release Evaristo for the tournament in Sweden; this soured the relationship between Evaristo and the club, and he would go on to join rivals Real Madrid, never playing again for the national team.

== Managerial career ==
Evaristo had a brief tenure as manager of the Brazil national team in 1985, and he later became head coach of Iraq for the 1986 World Cup. Evaristo would take on various further managerial positions, including three separate stints in charge of his former club Flamengo.

== Career statistics ==
Appearances and goals by club, season and competition
Club	Season	League		
Club	Season	Division	Apps	Goals
Barcelona	1957–58	La Liga	24	13
Barcelona	1958–59	La Liga	23	20
Barcelona	1959–60	La Liga	24	14
Barcelona	1960–61	La Liga	21	11
Barcelona	1961–62	La Liga	22	20
Barcelona	Total		114	78
Real Madrid	1962–63	La Liga	7	3
Real Madrid	1963–64	La Liga	10	1
Real Madrid	Total		17	4

== Managerial statistics ==
As of match played 17 August 2025

Managerial record by team and tenure
Team	Nat	From	To	Record							
Team	Nat	From	To	G	W	D	L	GF	GA	GD	Win %
Fluminense	(Brazil)	10 January 1968	1 December 1968	40	14	7	19	51	56	−5	35.00
Vasco da Gama	(Brazil)	10 January 1969	1 December 1969	41	12	12	17	47	42	+5	29.27
Qatar	(Qatar)	1 August 1980	24 April 1985	54	28	12	14	86	41	+45	51.85
Brazil	(Brazil)	25 April 1985	21 May 1985	6	3	0	3	7	6	+1	50.00
Qatar	(Qatar)	1 June 1985	1 May 1986	16	4	6	6	11	18	−7	25.00
Iraq	(Iraq)	1 May 1986	13 June 1986	3	0	0	3	1	4	−3	0.00
Qatar	(Qatar)	1 January 1992	30 December 1992	16	7	5	4	26	14	+12	43.75
Total				176	68	42	66	229	181	+48	38.64

== Honours ==
Flamengo

- Campeonato Carioca: 1953, 1954, 1955, 1965

Barcelona

- Inter-Cities Fairs Cup: 1955–58, 1958–60
- Copa del Generalísimo: 1958–59
- La Liga: 1958–59, 1959–60
- European Cup runner-up: 1960–61
- Small Club World Cup: 1957

Real Madrid

- La Liga: 1962–63, 1963–64
- European Cup runner-up: 1963–64
