= Harry Hooper (footballer, born 1933) =

English footballer (1933–2020)

Personal information
- Full name: Harold Hooper
- Date of birth: 14 June 1933
- Place of birth: Pittington, England
- Date of death: 26 August 2020 (aged 87)
- Place of death: Hunstanton, Norfolk, England
- Position: Outside forward

Youth career
- 194?–1950: Hylton Colliery Juniors

Senior career*
Years	Team	Apps	(Gls)
1950–1956	West Ham United	119	(39)
1956–1957	Wolverhampton Wanderers	39	(19)
1957–1960	Birmingham City	105	(34)
1960–1963	Sunderland	65	(16)
1963–1965	Kettering Town	68	(17)
1965–1967	Dunstable Town		
1967–1968	Heanor Town		

International career
1954–1957	England B	6	(2)
1955	England under-23	2	(2)
- * Club domestic league appearances and goals

Harold Hooper (14 June 1933 – 26 August 2020) was an English footballer who played as an outside forward. He made more than 300 appearances in the Football League, and represented England at under-23 and 'B' international level.

== Life and career ==
Hooper was born in Pittington, County Durham. He played football for Hylton Colliery Juniors and for the Durham youth side before joining West Ham United in November 1950 when his father, also named Harry Hooper, was appointed assistant trainer at the club. He played for the reserve team in the London Combination before making his debut in the Football League on 3 February 1951, at the age of 17 years 7 months, at home to Barnsley in the Second Division. West Ham won 4–2, and Hooper himself came close to scoring eight minutes from time, when "Barnsley's Pat Kelly had to stretch like elastic to push Harry's 25-yard drive over the bar".

The 1954–55 season saw Hooper make 41 league appearances for West Ham, one short of being an ever-present. This included a game against Leeds United on the afternoon of his wedding. He was made captain for the day and West Ham won the game 2–1. He played a total of 119 league games for the club, scoring 39 goals.

Hooper, an England under-23 and England 'B' international, was named as a reserve for the 1954 FIFA World Cup squad but did not travel, and never won a full international cap. He represented the Football League in games against the Irish League in 1954, and the Scottish League in 1955. He also played for the London XI in the Inter-Cities Fairs Cup group stage game against the Basel XI on 4 June 1955, a 5–0 victory. (Note: Some sources give the final goal to Hooper, while others attribute this to Eddie Firmani.)

Hooper moved to Wolverhampton Wanderers for £25,000 on 22 March 1956. He scored 19 goals in 39 league matches for Wolves, before his departure in December 1957. He then joined Birmingham City for a fee of around £20,000, spending nearly three years at the club and winning a runner-up medal in the 1960 Fairs Cup. He scored five times in the competition, including a consolation goal in the 4–1 loss to Barcelona in the Final.

In 1960, Hooper returned to the north-east, joining Sunderland for a fee of £18,000. He went on to play non-league football with Kettering Town, Dunstable Town and Heanor Town before retiring.

Hooper died on 26 August 2020 after a long battle with Alzheimer's.
