= Georgine Kellermann =

German journalist (born 1957)

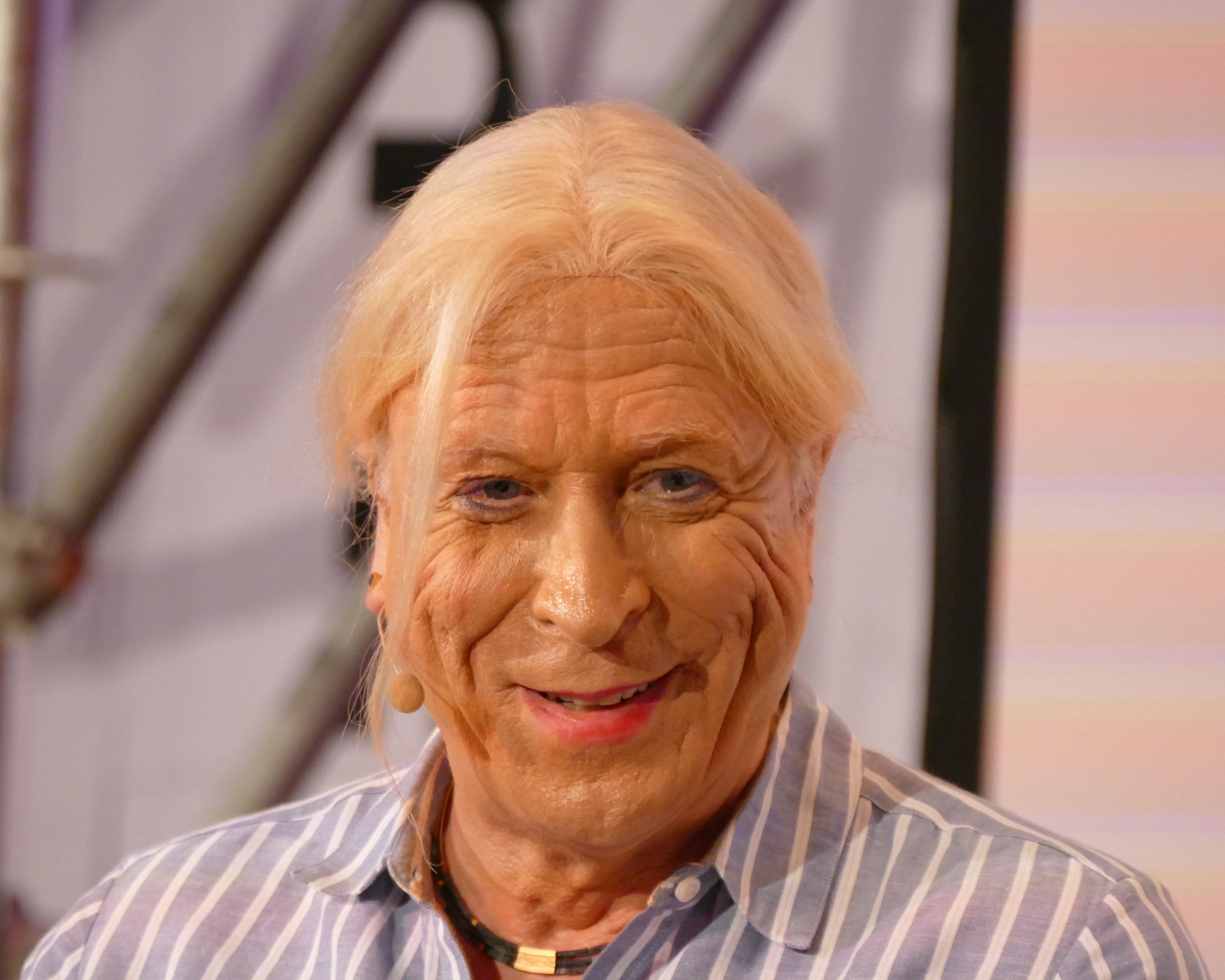
Kellermann at re:publica 2024 in Berlin

Georgine Kellermann (born Georg Kellermann, 21 September 1957) is a German journalist.

== Biography ==
=== Career ===
Georgine Kellermann was born in Ratingen, North Rhine-Westphalia. From 1969 until 1978, she attended the Theodor-Heuss-Gymnasium (now Carl Friedrich von Weizsäcker Gymnasium) secondary school in Ratingen, already writing for the local editorial office of the Rheinische Post before her graduation. In 1983, shortly after the WDR had started airing its evening program "Current Hour", Kellermann applied there and became regional correspondent for Duisburg and the Lower Rhine. The final industrial actions of steel workers in Duisburg-Rheinhausen were one of her biggest topics of coverage during this time.

In 1992, Kellermann joined the newly aired ARD morning show as a producer, and as a correspondent from Paris and Washington, D.C. Her work there would cause a move to Washington in 1997, as a permanent correspondent for the ARD. She then took up residence in Paris beginning in 2002 until 2006 when she began management of the ARD studio in Bonn. Thereafter, Kellermann would take on further leadership positions, first at the WDR studio in Duisburg in 2014, and then at the WDR studio in Essen in 2019.

=== Coming out ===
Kellermann had been out as transgender in her private life for a significant amount of time, including coming out to her father in the mid 1980s. Amongst her friends and family she presented femininely, yet in her capacity on television, she continued to play the part of a man. Kellermann has often voiced her frustrations regarding this in interviews, citing her fear of not being taken seriously by the public and not being accepted in her workplace as the main reasons for delaying her public coming out. While visiting the United States in 2019, she finally made the decision to make her gender identity publicly known through changing her profile pictures on social media and discussing it with her colleagues upon returning to Germany. She is now listed as "Studio lead Georgine Kellermann" by the WDR.

In 2020, Kellermann announced that she had gained legal recognition of her identity as a woman.

== Awards ==
1999: Radio, TV, and New Media Prize together with Tom Buhrow, Claus Kleber and Sabine Reifenberg for Oh Gott, Amerika! Glaube, Seelen, Scharlatane, a TV program about Evangelicals, travelling preachers and sectarians in the US
