= Günter Konzack =

East German footballer and manager

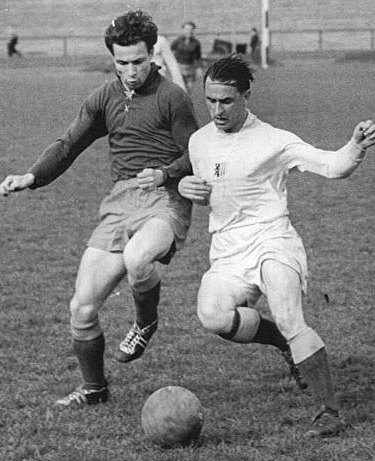
- Konzack (right) in 1957

Personal information
- Date of birth: 24 September 1930
- Place of birth: Bergheide, Germany
- Date of death: 16 February 2008 (aged 77)

Youth career
- 1945–1950: SG Annahütte
- 1950–1951: BSG Chemie Leipzig

Senior career*
Years	Team	Apps	(Gls)
1951–1953	BSG Chemie Leipzig	25	(?)
1953–1955	BSG Turbine Erfurt	29	(?)
1955–1960	SC Lokomotive Leipzig	132	(?)
Total		186	(?)

Managerial career
- 1960–1963: BSG Stahl Riesa
- 1963–1965: SC Leipzig II
- 1965–1966: 1. FC Lokomotive Leipzig
- 1966–1968: BSG Motor Steinach
- 1968–1970: BSG Lokomotive Stendal
- 1970–1971: 1. FC Magdeburg
- * Club domestic league appearances and goals

Günter Konzack (born 24 September 1930 in Bergheide, Germany, died 16 February 2008) was a former East German football player. He played in the top-flight DDR-Oberliga for BSG Turbine Erfurt and SC Lokomotive Leipzig. After his playing career Konzack worked as manager.

Konzack began to play football after the end of World War II, joining Sportgemeinschaft Annahütte as a 15-year-old. Aged 20 he took up studying for a sports diploma at the newly established Deutsche Hochschule für Körperkultur (DHfK) in Leipzig and belonged to the first graduates in 1953. In his time in Leipzig Konzack had played for BSG Chemie Leipzig, making his way into the Oberliga squad in 1951 and appearing in 25 Oberliga matches until 1953.

At the start of the 1953-54 season he transferred to Turbine Erfurt, winning the championship in his first year there. He played in 23 matches as a forward and was significantly involved in Erfurt's title win. Erfurt defended their title in the next season, but Konzack played a mere 6 matches this time.

In 1955 he returned to Leipzig, joining the successor of his former club, SC Lokomotive Leipzig. Until 1960 he played in 132 Oberliga matches for the club. On 22 December 1957 he won the FDGB-Pokal, Leipzig beating SC Empor Rostock 2–1. In the next year, Konzack was subbed in for the last eight minutes of extra time in the cup final, but his team lost 1–2 to SC Einheit Dresden.

At the end of the 1960 season Konzack ended his Oberliga career, joining third-tier BSG Chemie Riesa as a player-manager. When the team was relegated to the Bezirksliga Dresden in 1963, he once again returned to Leipzig and took over managing the reserve team of newly formed SC Leipzig. In the 1965-66 season he managed the Oberliga team of the club, but as he could not lead them to the expected top position, he had to take over second-tier BSG Motor Steinach in the summer of 1966. After finishing 6th and 4th in the DDR-Liga, Konzack took over BSG Lok Stendal, just relegated from the Oberliga, for the 1968-69 season. In his first season in Stendal, he closely missed out on promotion, finishing second in the league. After the first half of the following season Stendal was well up in the field with 20:6 points, but Konzack was sacked nevertheless and had to take over the role of a scientific advisor with BSG Lok. In the summer of 1970 he joined Oberliga side 1. FC Magdeburg as assistant manager of Heinz Krügel. In his first season with Magdeburg, Konzack served as a stand-in manager, as Heinz Krügel was studying at the DHfK.

== Honors ==
- DDR-Oberliga: 2
  - Winner 1953–54, 1954–55
- FDGB-Pokal: 1
  - Winner 1957
  - Runner-up 1958
