= Renzo Rovatti =

Italian footballer

Personal information
- Date of birth: 30 June 1939 (age 87)
- Place of birth: Milan, Italy
- Position: Striker

Senior career*
| Years | Team | Apps | (Gls) |
| 1957–1959 | Internazionale | 10 | (2) |
| 1959–1960 | Palermo | 2 | (0) |
| 1960–1961 | Napoli | 0 | (0) |
| 1961 | Lecco | 0 | (0) |
| 1961–1964 | Pro Patria | 78 | (9) |
| 1964–1967 | Pavia | | |
| 1968–1969 | Lugano | | |
- * Club domestic league appearances and goals

Renzo Rovatti (born 30 June 1939 in Milan) is an Italian former professional footballer.
