= Eulogio Martínez =

Paraguayan-Spanish footballer (1935–1984)

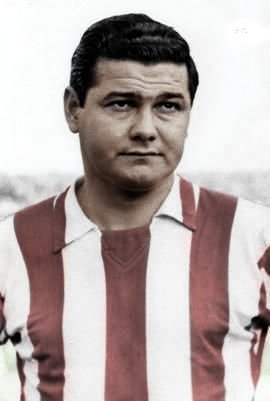

Personal information
- Full name: Eulogio Ramiro Martínez
- Date of birth: 11 June 1935
- Place of birth: Asunción, Paraguay
- Date of death: 30 September 1984 (aged 49)
- Place of death: Barcelona, Spain
- Height: 1.74 m (5 ft 9 in)
- Position: Striker

Youth career
- Atlántida

Senior career*
Years	Team	Apps	(Gls)
1953–1956	Libertad		
1956–1962	Barcelona	111	(62)
1962–1964	Elche	39	(7)
1964–1965	Atlético Madrid	2	(0)
1965–1966	Europa	10	(3)
- Calella

International career
1954–1955	Paraguay	9	(4)
1958	Spain B	1	(0)
1959–1962	Spain	8	(6)
1956	Catalan XI	1	(0)
- * Club domestic league appearances and goals

Eulogio Ramiro Martínez (11 June 1935 – 30 September 1984) was a Paraguayan-born footballer who played as a striker. He played for the Spanish side Barcelona in the 1950s and 1960s, and is remembered for being a prolific striker with an excellent finishing ability.

He was reputed to be the creator of the "Martinez Turn", which can be seen on Movietone footage of Barcelona's quarter-final match against Wolves in the 1959–60 European Cup. This move later received worldwide acclaim as the "Cruyff Turn" and although Johan Cruyff was at Barcelona when he demonstrated it in the 1974 World Cup, Martinez has never received any credit despite using it at least 14 years earlier.

== Club career ==
=== Years at Barcelona ===
After leading Club Libertad to a Paraguayan League title in 1955, Martínez drew the attention of Barcelona, who eventually signed him in 1956. Martínez soon showcased his talent in Barcelona by leading the team in scoring in three seasons (1956–57, 1957–58, 1959–60), obtaining two Spanish League titles, two Copas del Rey and two Inter-Cities Fairs Cups.

Martínez also became part of Barcelona's history by scoring the first goal ever at their current stadium, the Camp Nou, on 24 September 1957. The goal was scored in the 11th minute, in a friendly match celebrating the inauguration of the stadium against a Polish team. Barcelona won the match 4–2.

Another impressive accomplishment by Martínez while playing for Barcelona was when he scored seven goals in one match, in an 8–1 victory over Atlético Madrid in a Copa del Rey tie played on 1 May 1957.

=== Post-Barça Years ===
Hampered by being overweight, he left Barcelona in 1962, having scored 111 goals in 162 official matches. He went on to play for Elche, Atlético Madrid, and Europa.

== Club statistics ==
Club performance			League	
Season	Club	League	Apps	Goals
Spain			League	
1956–57	Barcelona	La Liga	23	9
1957–58	Barcelona	La Liga	19	10
1958–59	Barcelona	La Liga	16	7
1959–60	Barcelona	La Liga	24	23
1960–61	Barcelona	La Liga	13	4
1961–62	Barcelona	La Liga	16	9
Total			111	62

== International career ==
Martínez played for both Paraguay and Spain. For Paraguay he had 9 caps and 4 goals. For Spain he had 8 caps and 6 goals, and was part of the Spanish team that played at the 1962 FIFA World Cup. He played the opening game, a 1–0 defeat against Czechoslovakia, but was dropped from the team afterwards.

=== Spain International goals ===
#	Date	Venue	Opponent	Score	Result	Competition
1.	22 November 1959	Mestalla, Valencia, Spain	Austria	4–1	6–3	International Friendly
2.	17 December 1959	Parc des Princes, Paris, France	France	4–2	4–3	International Friendly
3.	13 March 1960	Camp Nou, Barcelona, Spain	Italy	3–1	3–1	International Friendly
4.	15 May 1960	Santiago Bernabéu, Madrid, Spain	England	2–0	3–0	International Friendly
5.	15 May 1960	Santiago Bernabéu, Madrid, Spain	England	3–0	3–0	International Friendly
6.	14 July 1960	Nacional, Santiago, Chile	Chile	0–4	0–4	International Friendly

== After retirement ==
After retiring in 1966, he established himself in the Catalan town of Calella. In 1984, he was run down by a car while changing a flat tire. He spent 23 days in a coma before dying on 30 September 1984.

== Honours ==
Club Libertad

- Paraguayan League: 1955

Barcelona

- Inter-Cities Fairs Cup: 1955–58, 1958–60
- Spanish League: 1958–59, 1959–60
- Spanish Cup: 1956–57, 1958–59

Atlético Madrid

- Spanish Cup: 1964–65

== See also ==
- List of Spain international footballers born outside Spain
