= 1957 Copa del Generalísimo =

55th Copa del Rey

Tournament details
- Country: Spain
- Teams: 16

Final positions
- Champions: FC Barcelona (13th title)
- Runners-up: RCD Español

Tournament statistics
- Matches played: 30
- Goals scored: 90 (3 per match)

The 1957 Copa del Generalísimo was the 55th staging of the Spanish Cup. The competition began on 28 April 1957 and concluded on 16 June 1957 with the final.

== Round of 16 ==
Team 1	Agg.	Team 2	1st leg	2nd leg
UD Las Palmas	1–5	Real Madrid CF	1–4	0–1
RC Celta de Vigo	1–0	CD Condal	1–0	0–0
Club Atlético de Madrid	3–13	FC Barcelona	2–5	1–8
Real Zaragoza CD	1–1	Real Sociedad de Fútbol	0–0	1–1
Valencia CF	2–1	Sevilla CF	2–0	0–1
Real Jaén CF	0–2	RC Deportivo de La Coruña	0–1	0–1
RCD Español	3–0	Club Atlético de Bilbao	3–0	0–0
CA Osasuna	4–7	Real Valladolid Deportivo	1–1	3–6

Source: RSSSF

- Tiebreaker

Team 1	Score	Team 2
Real Zaragoza CD	0–1	Real Sociedad de Fútbol

== Quarter-finals ==
Team 1	Agg.	Team 2	1st leg	2nd leg
RCD Español	3–2	RC Celta de Vigo	2–1	1–1
Real Madrid CF	3–8	FC Barcelona	2–2	1–6
Real Valladolid Deportivo	1–4	Valencia CF	1–1	0–3
RC Deportivo de La Coruña	1–7	Real Sociedad de Fútbol	0–0	1–7

Source: RSSSF

== Semi-finals ==
Team 1	Agg.	Team 2	1st leg	2nd leg
RCD Español	2–1	Valencia CF	1–0	1–1
Real Sociedad de Fútbol	2–10	FC Barcelona	1–5	1–5

Source: RSSSF

== Final ==
Team 1	Score	Team 2
FC Barcelona	1–0	RCD Español

Copa del Generalísimo
winners
FC Barcelona
13th title
