= 1958–1960 Inter-Cities Fairs Cup =

Tournament details
- Dates: 29 October 1958 – 4 May 1960
- Teams: 16

Final positions
- Champions: (Spain) Barcelona (2nd title)
- Runners-up: (England) Birmingham City

Tournament statistics
- Matches played: 30
- Goals scored: 120 (4 per match)
- Top scorer(s): (Socialist Federal Republic of Yugoslavia) Bora Kostić (Belgrade XI); 6 goals

The second Inter-Cities Fairs Cup took place between 1958 and 1960 and was won by Barcelona for the second consecutive time in a two-legged final against Birmingham City. Once again, a number of countries sent a representative team for one of their main cities, although London sent Chelsea instead. The Copenhagen XI was made up mostly of BK Frem players, and played in their colours.

== Teams location ==
Location of teams in the 1958–1960 Inter-Cities Fairs Cup.

== Bracket ==
First round
(Belgium) Union Saint-Gilloise	6	0	6
(East Germany) Leipzig XI	1	1	2
(West Germany) Hannover 96	1	1	2
(Italy) Roma	3	1	4
(West Germany) Cologne XI	2	0	2
(England) Birmingham City	2	2	4
(Socialist Federal Republic of Yugoslavia) Zagreb XI	4	0	4
(Hungary) Újpesti Dózsa	2	1	3
(Denmark) Copenhagen XI	1	1	2
(England) Chelsea	3	4	7
(Socialist Federal Republic of Yugoslavia) Belgrade XI	6	5	11
(Switzerland) Lausanne-Sport	1	3	4
(Switzerland) Basel XI	1	2	3
(Spain) Barcelona	2	5	7
(Italy) Inter Milan	7	1	8
(France) Lyon	0	1	1

Quarter-finals
(Belgium) Union Saint-Gilloise	2	1	3
(Italy) Roma	0	1	1
(England) Birmingham City	1	3	4
(Socialist Federal Republic of Yugoslavia) Zagreb XI	0	3	3
(England) Chelsea	1	1	2
(Socialist Federal Republic of Yugoslavia) Belgrade XI	0	4	4
(Spain) Barcelona	4	4	8
(Italy) Inter Milan	0	2	2

Semi-finals
(Belgium) Union Saint-Gilloise	2	2	4
(England) Birmingham City	4	4	8
(Socialist Federal Republic of Yugoslavia) Belgrade XI	1	1	2
(Spain) Barcelona	1	3	4

Final
(England) Birmingham City	0	1	1
(Spain) Barcelona	0	4	4

== First round ==
Team 1	Agg.	Team 2	1st leg	2nd leg
Union Saint-Gilloise (Belgium)	6–2	(East Germany) Leipzig XI	6–1	0–1
Hannover 96 (West Germany)	2–4	(Italy) Roma	1–3	1–1
Cologne XI (West Germany)	2–4	(England) Birmingham City	2–2	0–2
Zagreb XI (Socialist Federal Republic of Yugoslavia)	4–3	(Hungary) Újpesti Dózsa	4–2	0–1
Copenhagen XI (Denmark)	2–7	(England) Chelsea	1–3	1–4
Belgrade XI (Socialist Federal Republic of Yugoslavia)	11–4	(Switzerland) Lausanne-Sport	6–1	5–3
Basel XI (Switzerland)	3–7	(Spain) Barcelona	1–2	2–5
Inter Milan (Italy)	8–1	(France) Lyon	7–0	1–1

=== First leg ===
29 October 1958

Union Saint-Gilloise (Belgium)	6–1	(East Germany) Leipzig XI
van den Berg 12', 51' van Cauwelaert 16', 62' van Dormael 40', 59'		Scherbarth 86'

Stade Joseph Marien, Brussels

9 November 1958

Hannover 96 (West Germany)	1–3	(Italy) Roma
Kellermann 69'		Tasso 25' da Costa 74' 78'

Niedersachsenstadion, Hanover

14 October 1958

Cologne XI (West Germany)	2–2	(England) Birmingham City
Brungs 7'; Pfeiffer 12'		Neal 40'; Hooper 60'

Müngersdorfer Stadion, Cologne

26 November 1958

Zagreb XI (Socialist Federal Republic of Yugoslavia)	4–2	(Hungary) Újpesti Dózsa
Győrvari 19' (o.g.); Jerković 33', 55'; Lackovic 70'		Szusza 31'; Bencsics 40'

Stadion Maksimir, Zagreb

30 September 1958

Copenhagen XI (Denmark)	1–3	(England) Chelsea
Gronemann 25'		Harrison 13'; Greaves 54'; Nicholas 90'

Idrætsparken, Copenhagen

24 September 1958

Belgrade XI (Socialist Federal Republic of Yugoslavia)	6–1	(Switzerland) Lausanne-Sport
Milutinović 40', 88'; Kostić 58', 63'; Mitić 65'; Ognjanović 67' (pen.)		Jonsson 2'

Omladinski Stadium, Belgrade

12 November 1958

Basel XI (Switzerland)	1–2	(Spain) Barcelona
Hosp 76'		Evaristo 54'; Gensana 80'

St. Jakob Stadium, Basel

10 December 1958

Inter Milan (Italy)	7–0	(France) Lyon
Angelillo 17' 28'; Firmani 37' 72' 75' 79'; Lindskog 56'

Arena Civica, Milan
Attendance: 4,000
Referee: Vilmos Hernádi (Hungary)

=== Second leg ===
4 March 1959

Leipzig XI (East Germany)	1–0	(Belgium) Union Saint-Gilloise
Scherbarth 64'

Bruno-Plache-Stadion, Leipzig

Union Saint-Gilloise won 6–2 on aggregate.

7 January 1959

Roma (Italy)	1–1	(West Germany) Hannover 96
Tasso 23'		Gollnow 4'

Stadio dei Centomila, Rome

Roma won 4–2 on aggregate.

11 November 1958

Birmingham City (England)	2–0	(West Germany) Cologne XI
Larkin 59'; Taylor 67'

St Andrew's, Birmingham

Birmingham City won 4–2 on aggregate.

3 December 1958

Újpesti Dózsa (Hungary)	1–0	(Socialist Federal Republic of Yugoslavia) Zagreb XI
Szini 73'

Megyeri úti Stadium, Budapest

Zagreb XI won 4–3 on aggregate.

4 November 1958

Chelsea (England)	4–1	(Denmark) Copenhagen XI
Lees 6' (o.g.); Greaves 44', 70'; Sillett 72'		Schøne 7'

Stamford Bridge, London

Chelsea won 7–2 on aggregate.

22 October 1958

Lausanne-Sport (Switzerland)	3–5	(Socialist Federal Republic of Yugoslavia) Belgrade XI
Regamey 29'; Stalder 53', 62'		Rudinski 13', 75'; Kostić 32', 89'; Šekularac 87'

Stade Olympique de la Pontaise, Lausanne

Belgrade XI won 11–4 on aggregate.

6 January 1959

Barcelona (Spain)	5–2	(Switzerland) Basel XI
Villaverde 15'; Czibor 23', 86'; Evaristo 34'; Gonzalez 55'		Hügi II 69' (pen.); Burger 77'

Estadi del FC Barcelona, Barcelona

Barcelona won 7–3 on aggregate.

14 January 1959

Lyon (France)	1–1	(Italy) Inter Milan
Cossou 19'		Rovatti 70'

Stade de Gerland, Lyon
Attendance: 2,000
Referee: Daniel Mellet (Switzerland)

Internazionale won 8–1 on aggregate.

== Quarter-finals ==
Team 1	Agg.	Team 2	1st leg	2nd leg
Union Saint-Gilloise (Belgium)	3–1	(Italy) Roma	2–0	1–1
Birmingham City (England)	4–3	(Socialist Federal Republic of Yugoslavia) Zagreb XI	1–0	3–3
Chelsea (England)	2–4	(Socialist Federal Republic of Yugoslavia) Belgrade XI	1–0	1–4
Barcelona (Spain)	8–2	(Italy) Inter Milan	4–0	4–2

=== First leg ===
22 April 1959

Union Saint-Gilloise (Belgium)	2–0	(Italy) Roma
van Dormeal 35'; Janssens 61'

Stade Joseph Marien, Brussels

6 May 1959

Birmingham City (England)	1–0	(Socialist Federal Republic of Yugoslavia) Zagreb XI
Larkin 41'

St Andrew's, Birmingham

29 April 1959

Chelsea (England)	1–0	(Socialist Federal Republic of Yugoslavia) Belgrade XI
Brabrook 30'

Stamford Bridge, London

7 May 1959

Barcelona (Spain)	4–0	(Italy) Inter Milan
E. Martínez 11'; Ribelles 34'; Villaverde 77'; Segarra 81'

Nuevo Estadio, Barcelona
Attendance: 50,000
Referee: Louis Fauquembergue (France)

=== Second leg ===
13 May 1959

Roma (Italy)	1–1	(Belgium) Union Saint-Gilloise
da Costa 23'		Van Den Berg 49'

Stadio dei Centomila, Rome

Union Saint-Gilloise won 3–1 on aggregate.

24 May 1959

Zagreb XI (Socialist Federal Republic of Yugoslavia)	3–3	(England) Birmingham City
Dvornić 52', 72'; Gaspert 87'		Larkin 32', 62'; Hooper 47'

Stadion Maksimir, Zagreb

Birmingham City won 4–3 on aggregate.

13 May 1959

Belgrade XI (Socialist Federal Republic of Yugoslavia)	4–1	(England) Chelsea
Petaković 3'; Mihajlovic 42', 86'; Kostić 65'		Brabrook 51'

Omladinski Stadium, Belgrade

Belgrade XI won 4–2 on aggregate.

30 September 1959

Inter Milan (Italy)	2–4	(Spain) Barcelona
Firmani 50'; Mereghetti 59'		E. Martínez 9' 74'; Kubala 51' 89'

San Siro, Milan
Attendance: 30,000
Referee: Ken Aston (England)

Barcelona won 8–2 on aggregate.

== Semi-finals ==
Team 1	Agg.	Team 2	1st leg	2nd leg
Union Saint-Gilloise (Belgium)	4–8	(England) Birmingham City	2–4	2–4
Belgrade XI (Socialist Federal Republic of Yugoslavia)	2–4	(Spain) Barcelona	1–1	1–3

=== First leg ===
7 October 1959

Union Saint-Gilloise (Belgium)	2–4	(England) Birmingham City
Janssens 9'; Cauwelaert 46'		Hooper 25'; Gordon 39'; Taylor 72'; Barret 79'

Stade Joseph Marien, Brussels

28 October 1959

Belgrade XI (Socialist Federal Republic of Yugoslavia)	1–1	(Spain) Barcelona
Kostić 69'		Evaristo 44'

Omladinski Stadium, Belgrade

=== Second leg ===
11 November 1959

Birmingham City (England)	4–2	(Belgium) Union Saint-Gilloise
Gordon 15', 63'; Larkin 32'; Hooper 89' (pen.)		Janssens 60'; Diricx 78' (pen.)

St Andrew's, Birmingham

Birmingham City won 8–4 on aggregate

9 December 1959

Barcelona (Spain)	3–1	(Socialist Federal Republic of Yugoslavia) Belgrade XI
Kubala 5'; Evaristo 57'; Martinez 85'		Mihajlovic 43'

Nuevo Estadio, Barcelona

Barcelona won 4–2 on aggregate

== Final ==
=== First leg ===
29 March 1960
19:15

Birmingham City (England)	0–0	(Spain) Barcelona

St Andrew's, Birmingham
Attendance: 40,524
Referee: Lucien van Nuffel (Belgium)

=== Second leg ===
4 May 1960
20.30

Barcelona (Spain)	4–1	(England) Birmingham City
Martínez 3'; Czibor 6', 48'; Coll 78'		Hooper 82'

Camp Nou, Barcelona
Attendance: 70,000
Referee: Lucien van Nuffel (Belgium)
