= 1955–1958 Inter-Cities Fairs Cup =

Football tournament

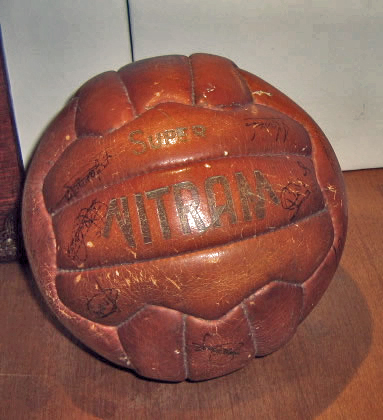
- Ball used in the final (FC Barcelona Museum)

Tournament details
- Dates: 4 June 1955 – 1 May 1958
- Teams: 12 (10 competed)

Final positions
- Champions: (Spain) Barcelona XI (Later recognized as FC Barcelona) (1st title)
- Runners-up: (England) London XI

Tournament statistics
- Matches played: 23
- Goals scored: 93 (4.04 per match)
- Top scorer(s): (Brazil) Evaristo (Barcelona XI) (England) Peter Murphy (Birmingham City); 4 goals each

The first Inter-Cities Fairs Cup took place over three seasons from 1955 to 1958. The competition began with a group stage with each team playing home and away against each other. Due to the competition rules which stated only one side from each city was allowed to compete, many cities with several football clubs picked the best players from those teams to create a city representative side. One of these, the London XI, went onto reach the final where they were beaten over two legs by the Barcelona XI (later recognized as FC Barcelona).

== Teams location ==
Location of teams in the 1955–1958 Inter-Cities Fairs Cup.
Brown: Group A; Red: Group B; Orange: Group C; Yellow: Group D

== Group stage ==
=== Group A ===
Pos	Team	Pld	W	D	L	GF	GA	GD	Pts
1	(Spain) Barcelona XI	2	1	1	0	7	3	+4	3
2	(Denmark) Copenhagen XI	2	0	1	1	3	7	−4	1
3	(Austria) Vienna XI (W)	0	0	0	0	0	0	0	0

(W) Withdrew from the competition
25 December 1955

Barcelona XI (Spain)	6–2	(Denmark) Copenhagen XI
Areta 8', 10'; Tejada 40', 80'; Villaverde 40'; Kubala 59'	Report	Lundberg 65', 75'

Camp de Les Corts, Barcelona

26 April 1956

Copenhagen XI (Denmark)	1–1	(Spain) Barcelona XI
Lundberg 61'	Report	Villaverde 85'

Københavns Idrætspark, Copenhagen

=== Group B ===
Pos	Team	Pld	W	D	L	GF	GA	GD	Pts
1	(England) Birmingham City	4	3	1	0	6	1	+5	7
2	(Italy) Inter Milan	4	2	1	1	6	2	+4	5
3	(Socialist Federal Republic of Yugoslavia) Zagreb XI	4	0	0	4	0	9	−9	0

16 May 1956

Inter Milan (Italy)	0–0	(England) Birmingham City
	Report

Arena Civica, Milan
Attendance: 8,000
Referee: Paul Wyssling (Switzerland)

22 May 1956

Zagreb XI (Socialist Federal Republic of Yugoslavia)	0–1	(England) Birmingham City
	Report	Brown 8'

Stadion Maksimir, Zagreb

6 June 1956

Zagreb XI (Socialist Federal Republic of Yugoslavia)	0–1	(Italy) Inter Milan
	Report	Campagnoli 74'

Stadion Maksimir, Zagreb
Attendance: 40,000
Referee: Ezio Damiani (Yugoslavia)

3 December 1956

Birmingham City (England)	3–0	(Socialist Federal Republic of Yugoslavia) Zagreb XI
Orritt 3'; Brown 60'; Murphy 67'	Report

St Andrew's, Birmingham

19 March 1957

Inter Milan (Italy)	4–0	(Socialist Federal Republic of Yugoslavia) Zagreb XI
Skoglund 8', 89'; Lorenzi 43', 50'	Report

Arena Civica, Milan
Attendance: 5,000
Referee: Josef Gulde (Switzerland)

17 April 1957

Birmingham City (England)	2–1	(Italy) Inter Milan
Govan 44', 53'	Report	Lorenzi 88'

St Andrew's, Birmingham
Attendance: 34,461
Referee: Juan Gardeazábal Garay (Spain)

=== Group C ===
Pos	Team	Pld	W	D	L	GF	GA	GD	Pts
1	(Switzerland) Lausanne-Sport	2	1	0	1	10	9	+1	2
2	(East Germany) Leipzig XI	2	1	0	1	9	10	−1	2
3	(West Germany) Cologne XI (W)	0	0	0	0	0	0	0	0

(W) Withdrew from the competition
6 March 1956

Leipzig XI (East Germany)	6–3	(Switzerland) Lausanne-Sport
Walter 5'; Konzack 9', 82'; Krause 23', 36'; Fettke 69'	Report	Maillard 11'; Rey 31'; Eschmann 43'

Bruno-Plache-Stadion, Leipzig

21 October 1956

Lausanne-Sport (Switzerland)	7–3	(East Germany) Leipzig XI
Tedeschi 28'; Eschmann 37', 43', 55'; Moser 38'; Stefano 60', 62'	Report	Walter 13'; Konzack 58'; Frohlich 70'

Stade Olympique de la Pontaise, Lausanne

=== Group D ===
Pos	Team	Pld	W	D	L	GF	GA	GD	Pts
1	(England) London XI	4	3	0	1	9	3	+6	6
2	(West Germany) Frankfurt XI	4	2	0	2	10	10	0	4
3	(Switzerland) Basel XI	4	1	0	3	7	13	−6	2

4 June 1955

Basel XI (Switzerland)	0–5	(England) London XI
	Report	Firmani 35', 81' (Note: Some sources give the final goal to Hooper.); Holton 37', 43', 74'

St. Jakob Stadium, Basel

26 October 1955

London XI (England)	3–2	(West Germany) Frankfurt XI
Jezzard 46', 86'; Robson 60'	Report	Pfaff 25'; Kaufhold 30'

Wembley Stadium, London

4 May 1956

London XI (England)	1–0	(Switzerland) Basel XI
Robb 87'	Report

White Hart Lane, London

20 June 1956

Frankfurt XI (West Germany)	5–1	(Switzerland) Basel XI
Buchenau 19', 80'; Pfaff 31', 73'; Herrmann 52'	Report	Hugi 35'

Stadion am Bornheimer Hang, Frankfurt

27 March 1957

Frankfurt XI (West Germany)	1–0	(England) London XI
Preisendorfer 72'	Report

Riederwaldstadion, Frankfurt

12 June 1957

Basel XI (Switzerland)	6–2	(West Germany) Frankfurt XI
Allemann 3', 47', 66'; Sanmann 33'; Hugi 64'; Burger 88'	Report	Kraus 32'; Mayer 65'

Landhof, Basel

== Knockout stage ==
Semi-finals
(Switzerland) Lausanne-Sport	2	0	2
(England) London XI	1	2	3
(England) Birmingham City	4	0	4 (1)
(Spain) Barcelona XI	3	1	4 (2)

Final
(England) London XI	2	0	2
(Spain) Barcelona XI	2	6	8

- Teams playing first leg at home shown first.
- Birmingham City and Barcelona required a play-off after their semi-final finished level on aggregate. The play-off was played in Switzerland.

=== Semi-finals ===
Team 1	Agg.	Team 2	1st leg	2nd leg	Play-off
Lausanne-Sport (Switzerland)	2–3	(England) London XI	2–1	0–2	
Birmingham City (England)	4–4	(Spain) Barcelona XI	4–3	0–1	1–2

==== First leg ====
23 October 1957

Lausanne-Sport (Switzerland)	2–1	(England) London XI
Vonlanden 6', 74'	Report	Haverty 70'

Stade Olympique de la Pontaise, Lausanne

23 October 1957

Birmingham City (England)	4–3	(Spain) Barcelona XI
Eddy Brown 2'; Orritt 33'; Murphy 35', 60'	Report	Tejada 12'; Evaristo 27'; Martínez 40'

St Andrew's, Birmingham

==== Second leg ====
13 November 1957

London XI (England)	2–0	(Switzerland) Lausanne-Sport
Greaves 10'; Holton 76'	Report

Stamford Bridge, London

13 November 1957

Barcelona XI (Spain)	1–0	(England) Birmingham City
Kubala 82'	Report

Camp Nou, Barcelona

Play-off

26 November 1957

Barcelona XI (Spain)	2–1	(England) Birmingham City
Evaristo 33'; Kubala 83'	Report	Murphy 48'

St. Jakob Stadium, Basel

=== Final ===
==== First leg ====
5 March 1958

London XI (England)	2–2	(Spain) Barcelona XI
Greaves 10'; Langley 88' (pen.)		Martínez 7'; Tejada 35'

Stamford Bridge, London
Attendance: 45,466
Referee: Albert Dusch (West Germany)

==== Second leg ====
1 May 1958

Barcelona XI (Spain)	6–0	(England) London XI
Suárez 6', 8'; Martínez 42'; Evaristo 52', 75'; Vergés 63'

Camp Nou, Barcelona
Attendance: 70,000
Referee: Albert Dusch (West Germany)
