= CD Condal =

Association football club in Spain

Condal
- Full name: Club Deportivo Condal
- Founded: 1 August 1934
- Dissolved: 1970
- Ground: Les Corts, Barcelona, Catalonia, Spain
- Capacity: 25,000
- League: 3ª - Group 4
- 1969–70: 3ª - Group 4, 5th
Home colours	Away colours

Club Deportivo Condal was a Spanish football club based in Barcelona, in the autonomous community of Catalonia. Founded in 1934 and dissolved in 1970, it held home games at Camp de Les Corts, with a capacity of 25,000 spectators.

== History ==
Condal was founded on 1 August 1934 as Sección Deportiva La España Industrial, being renamed Club Deportivo Condal 22 years later. Between 1956 and 1961 it played in La Liga and Segunda División, having its only top flight experience in the 1956–57 season, finishing in 16th and last position.

Condal spent the last nine years of its existence in Tercera División, with the exception of two campaigns in the second level. In 1970 it merged with Atlètic Catalunya to form a new club, FC Barcelona Atlètic who acted as FC Barcelona's reserves.

== Season to season ==
- As La España Industrial

Season	Tier	Division	Place	Copa del Rey
1941–42	4	2ª Reg.	2nd	
1942–43	4	2ª Reg.	1st	
1943–44	4	1ª Reg. A	7th	
1944–45	4	1ª Reg. A	8th	
1945–46	4	1ª Reg. A	5th	
1946–47	4	1ª Reg.	2nd	
1947–48	3	3ª	10th	
1948–49	4	1ª Reg.	9th	

Season	Tier	Division	Place	Copa del Rey
1949–50	4	1ª Reg. A	1st	
1950–51	3	3ª	4th	
1951–52	3	3ª	1st	
1952–53	2	2ª	2nd	Third round
1953–54	2	2ª	5th	
1954–55	2	2ª	11th	
1955–56	2	2ª	3rd	

- As CD Condal

Season	Tier	Division	Place	Copa del Rey
1956–57	1	1ª	16th	First round
1957–58	2	2ª	5th	
1958–59	2	2ª	4th	Round of 32
1959–60	2	2ª	10th	First round
1960–61	2	2ª	12th	Round of 32
1961–62	3	3ª	2nd	
1962–63	3	3ª	3rd	

Season	Tier	Division	Place	Copa del Rey
1963–64	3	3ª	8th	
1964–65	3	3ª	1st	
1965–66	2	2ª	7th	Round of 32
1966–67	2	2ª	16th	First round
1967–68	3	3ª	1st	
1968–69	3	3ª	7th	
1969–70	3	3ª	5th	Second round

- 1 season in La Liga
- 10 seasons in Segunda División
- 9 seasons in Tercera División

== Logo evolution ==
España Industrial logo

España Industrial
CD Condal (1956)
CD Condal (1968)

== Famous players ==
- (Spain) Luis Suárez
- (Spain) Enric Gensana
- (Spain) Mariano Gonzalvo
- (Spain) Carles Rexach
- (Spain) Manuel Sanchís
- (Spain) Justo Tejada
- (Czechoslovakia) Jiří Hanke
- (Uruguay) Dagoberto Moll
