= 1958–59 Copa del Generalísimo =

57th Copa del Rey

Tournament details
- Country: Spain
- Teams: 48

Final positions
- Champions: CF Barcelona (14th title)
- Runners-up: Granada CF

Tournament statistics
- Matches played: 98

The 1958–59 Copa del Generalísimo was the 57th staging of the Copa del Rey. The competition began on 21 December 1958 and concluded on 21 June 1959 with the final.

== First round ==
Team 1	Agg.	Team 2	1st leg	2nd leg
CD Alavés	1–5	Cádiz CF	1–1	0–4
CD Badajoz	7–5	Sestao SC	5–3	2–2
Baracaldo CF	3–5	Córdoba CF	0–2	3–3
CD Basconia	6–3	CD Málaga	2–2	4–1
Club Atlético de Ceuta	3–5	CD Condal	3–4	0–1
RC Deportivo de La Coruña	6–4	Club Atlético de Almería	3–0	3–4
Elche CF	7–4	Gerona CF	5–0	2–4
CD Eldense	6–2	Real Avilés CF	4–0	2–2
Club Ferrol	3–4	CF Extremadura	2–0	1–4
Hércules CF	6–1	AD Rayo Vallecano	5–0	1–1
Real Jaén CF	1–5	Real Valladolid Deportivo	1–1	0–4
Levante UD	5–4	Tarrasa CF	4–2	1–2
CD Sabadell CF	1–4	Real Murcia CF	1–4	0–0
CD San Fernando	2–3	SD Indauchu	1–0	1–3
Real Santander SD	1–2	AD Plus Ultra	0–0	1–2
Real Unión Club	2–2	CD Tenerife	2–0	0–2

Source: RSSSF

- Tiebreaker

Team 1	Score	Team 2
Real Unión Club	1–5	CD Tenerife

== Round of 32 ==
Team 1	Agg.	Team 2	1st leg	2nd leg
AD Plus Ultra	4–3	Real Sociedad de Fútbol	1–1	3–2
Atlético Madrid	5–3	CD Basconia	5–1	0–2
CD Badajoz	1–2	CA Osasuna	0–0	1–2
CF Barcelona	3–2	Real Murcia CF	2–2	1–0
Real Betis Balompié	6–4	CD Tenerife	6–1	0–3
RC Celta de Vigo	3–3	CD Condal	2–2	1–1
RC Deportivo de La Coruña	3–2	Real Oviedo CF	1–0	2–2
CD Eldense	2–5	Atlético de Bilbao	0–3	2–2
CF Extremadura	0–8	Real Madrid CF	0–5	0–3
Real Gijón	3–2	Real Valladolid Deportivo	2–0	1–2
Granada CF	9–6	Elche CF	8–1	1–5
Hércules CF	1–2	RCD Español	1–1	0–1
SD Indauchu	2–2	Sevilla CF	2–2	0–0
UD Las Palmas	2–3	Cádiz CF	2–1	0–2
Valencia CF	7–2	Córdoba CF	4–0	3–2
Real Zaragoza CD	4–3	Levante UD	3–0	1–3

Source: RSSSF

- Tiebreaker

Team 1	Score	Team 2
RC Celta de Vigo	1–0	CD Condal
SD Indauchu	2–3	Sevilla CF

== Round of 16 ==
Team 1	Agg.	Team 2	1st leg	2nd leg
Real Betis Balompié	3–0	RC Celta de Vigo	3–0	0–0
RC Deportivo de La Coruña	3–3	AD Plus Ultra	3–1	0–2
RCD Español	2–5	Atlético de Madrid	1–0	1–5
Real Gijón	0–6	CF Barcelona	0–0	0–6
Granada CF	10–3	Cádiz CF	6–0	4–3
CA Osasuna	3–4	Sevilla CF	2–2	1–2
Real Madrid CF	5–1	Atlético de Bilbao	4–1	1–0
Real Zaragoza CD	1–3	Valencia CF	0–2	1–1

Source: RSSSF

- Tiebreaker

Team 1	Score	Team 2
RC Deportivo de La Coruña	1–2	AD Plus Ultra

== Quarter-finals ==
Team 1	Agg.	Team 2	1st leg	2nd leg
AD Plus Ultra	2–7	Granada CF	1–4	1–3
Real Betis Balompié	3–10	CF Barcelona	0–6	3–4
Real Madrid CF	3–2	Sevilla CF	3–1	0–1
Valencia CF	5–2	Atlético de Madrid	2–1	3–1

Source: RSSSF

== Semi-finals ==
Team 1	Agg.	Team 2	1st leg	2nd leg
Granada CF	1–1	Valencia CF	1–0	0–1
Real Madrid CF	3–7	CF Barcelona	2–4	1–3

Source: RSSSF

- Tiebreaker

Team 1	Score	Team 2
Granada CF	3–1	Valencia CF

== Final ==
Team 1	Score	Team 2
CF Barcelona	4–1	Granada CF

Copa del Generalísimo
1958–59 winners
CF Barcelona
14th title
