= 1959–60 La Liga =

29th season of La Liga

Primera División
- Season: 1959–60
- Champions: Barcelona (8th title)
- Relegated: Osasuna; Las Palmas
- European Cup: Barcelona; Real Madrid (as title holders)
- Inter-Cities Fairs Cup: Barcelona
- Matches: 240
- Goals: 807 (3.36 per match)
- Top goalscorer: Ferenc Puskás (25 goals)
- Biggest home win: Real Madrid 11–2 Elche
- Biggest away win: Las Palmas 0–8 Barcelona
- Highest scoring: Real Madrid 11–2 Elche
- Longest winning run: 8 matches Barcelona
- Longest unbeaten run: 14 matches Barcelona
- Longest winless run: 15 matches Las Palmas
- Longest losing run: 11 matches Las Palmas

The 1959–60 La Liga was the 29th season since its establishment. The season began on 13 September 1959, and concluded on 17 April 1960.

== Team locations ==
Location of teams in 1959–60 La Liga
Canary Islands

Team	Home city	Stadium
Atlético Bilbao	Bilbao	San Mamés
Atlético Madrid	Madrid	Metropolitano
Barcelona	Barcelona	Nou Camp
Elche	Elche	Altabix
Español	Barcelona	Sarriá
Granada	Granada	Los Cármenes
Las Palmas	Las Palmas	Insular
Osasuna	Pamplona	San Juan
Oviedo	Oviedo	Carlos Tartiere
Real Betis	Seville	Heliópolis
Real Madrid	Madrid	Santiago Bernabéu
Real Sociedad	San Sebastián	Atocha
Sevilla	Seville	Ramón Sánchez Pizjuán
Valencia	Valencia	Mestalla
Valladolid	Valladolid	José Zorrilla
Zaragoza	Zaragoza	La Romareda

== League table ==
Pos	Team	Pld	W	D	L	GF	GA	GD	Pts	Qualification or relegation
1	Barcelona (C)	30	22	2	6	86	28	+58	46	Qualified for the European Cup and the Inter-Cities Fairs Cup
2	Real Madrid (Note: Real Madrid qualified as title holders.)	30	21	4	5	92	36	+56	46	Qualified for the European Cup
3	Atlético Bilbao	30	19	1	10	74	45	+29	39	
4	Sevilla	30	16	4	10	63	44	+19	36	
5	Atlético Madrid	30	15	3	12	59	40	+19	33	
6	Oviedo	30	13	7	10	38	51	−13	33	
7	Real Betis	30	15	3	12	42	53	−11	33	
8	Español	30	11	8	11	33	29	+4	30	
9	Valencia	30	11	6	13	37	33	+4	28	
10	Elche	30	11	5	14	41	64	−23	27	
11	Zaragoza	30	10	5	15	49	58	−9	25	
12	Granada	30	10	5	15	38	52	−14	25	
13	Valladolid (O)	30	11	3	16	48	61	−13	25	Qualified for the relegation play-offs
14	Real Sociedad (O)	30	10	3	17	41	61	−20	23	Qualified for the relegation play-offs
15	Osasuna (R)	30	8	2	20	42	75	−33	18	Relegated to Segunda División
16	Las Palmas (R)	30	5	3	22	24	77	−53	13	Relegated to Segunda División

Source: BDFútbol
Rules for classification: 1) Points; 2) Head-to-head results; 3) Goal difference; 4) Number of goals scored
(C) Champions; (O) Play-off winners; (R) Relegated

== Results ==
Home \ Away	ATB	ATM	BAR	ELC	ESP	GRA	LPA	OSA	OVI	BET	RMA	RSO	SEV	VAL	VAD	ZAR
Atlético Bilbao	—	5–2	4–1	5–0	2–0	3–0	4–1	4–1	6–0	4–1	1–3	4–0	2–5	2–0	4–3	3–1
Atlético Madrid	0–1	—	0–1	5–1	3–1	0–2	3–0	1–2	4–0	6–1	3–3	3–0	3–2	0–0	2–3	1–1
Barcelona	4–1	2–1	—	2–0	1–0	5–4	8–0	6–0	3–1	6–0	3–1	3–0	5–0	2–1	5–1	5–0
Elche	0–1	3–4	2–1	—	1–0	1–0	0–0	2–1	1–0	1–3	1–5	3–2	3–2	2–1	2–1	5–0
Español	1–0	2–0	0–1	3–0	—	3–0	0–0	2–1	1–1	1–1	1–1	4–2	3–1	0–2	2–0	2–1
Granada	3–2	1–0	0–0	0–0	1–0	—	5–1	2–1	0–0	1–2	3–4	0–0	0–1	1–0	3–0	2–1
Las Palmas	0–2	0–3	0–8	1–1	0–2	1–2	—	2–4	0–1	1–2	0–1	2–0	2–1	1–0	4–0	2–0
Osasuna	1–4	1–3	2–3	1–3	1–0	2–0	4–1	—	4–3	0–1	1–2	1–1	1–2	2–1	4–1	2–3
Oviedo	2–0	1–0	2–0	1–1	1–0	2–2	1–0	2–1	—	1–0	1–1	2–1	2–3	0–0	2–1	5–0
Real Betis	1–0	1–4	0–3	2–2	2–1	3–2	2–1	3–0	3–0	—	1–0	3–0	1–4	2–0	0–0	1–2
Real Madrid	3–1	3–2	2–0	11–2	4–0	6–0	2–0	7–0	8–1	7–1	—	4–0	1–0	2–1	1–0	2–1
Real Sociedad	1–3	0–3	0–0	4–2	0–2	1–0	6–0	4–1	6–2	1–0	1–3	—	2–0	2–0	4–2	1–0
Sevilla	5–0	3–0	0–3	4–1	0–0	2–0	3–2	3–1	0–1	2–1	4–1	3–0	—	1–1	5–0	1–0
Valencia	3–2	0–1	2–0	1–0	0–0	2–0	1–0	3–0	1–1	1–2	2–1	3–0	3–3	—	1–0	4–0
Valladolid	2–2	0–1	1–4	1–0	1–1	3–2	5–0	5–1	3–0	0–1	3–1	4–1	3–1	3–2	—	2–1
Zaragoza	1–2	0–1	3–1	2–1	1–1	6–2	6–2	1–1	1–2	2–1	2–2	4–1	2–2	3–1	4–0	—

Source: BDFútbol
Legend: Blue = home team win; Yellow = draw; Red = away team win.

== Relegation play-offs ==
Play-off between Córdoba and Real Sociedad was decided after a tie-break match, where Real Sociedad won 1–0.

Team 1	Agg.	Team 2	1st leg	2nd leg
Celta Vigo	2–5	Valladolid	2–2	0–5
Córdoba	2–2	Real Sociedad	2–1	0–1

== Pichichi Trophy ==
Rank	Player	Club	Goals
1	(Spain) Ferenc Puskás	Real Madrid	25
2	(Spain) Eulogio Martínez	Barcelona	23
3	(Spain) Eneko Arieta	Atlético Bilbao	18
4	(Spain) Joaquín Peiró	Atlético Madrid	17
5	(Spain) Félix Marcaida	Atlético Bilbao	16
