= 1958–59 La Liga =

28th season of La Liga

Primera División
- Season: 1958–59
- Champions: Barcelona (7th title)
- Relegated: Real Gijón; Celta Vigo
- European Cup: Barcelona; Real Madrid (as title holders)
- Matches: 240
- Goals: 775 (3.23 per match)
- Top goalscorer: Alfredo Di Stéfano (23 goals)
- Biggest home win: Atlético Bilbao 9–0 Celta Vigo; Atlético Bilbao 9–0 Real Gijón; Real Madrid 10–1 Las Palmas
- Biggest away win: Osasuna 1–8 Atlético Bilbao
- Highest scoring: Real Madrid 10–1 Las Palmas
- Longest winning run: 9 matches Barcelona
- Longest unbeaten run: 9 matches Barcelona
- Longest winless run: 11 matches Celta Vigo
- Longest losing run: 5 matches Celta Vigo; Las Palmas

The 1958–59 La Liga season was the 28th since its establishment. The season began on 14 September 1958, and concluded on 19 April 1959.

== Competition format ==
For this season, the relegation play-offs were re-established. 13th and 14th qualified teams would play a double-legged playoff against the second qualified teams of the two groups of Segunda División.

== Team locations ==
Location of teams in 1958–59 La Liga
Canary Islands

Sevilla inaugurated this season the Ramón Sánchez Pizjuán Stadium.

Team	Home city	Stadium
Atlético Bilbao	Bilbao	San Mamés
Atlético Madrid	Madrid	Metropolitano
Barcelona	Barcelona	Nou Camp
Celta	Vigo	Balaídos
Español	Barcelona	Sarriá
Granada	Granada	Los Cármenes
Las Palmas	Las Palmas	Insular
Osasuna	Pamplona	San Juan
Oviedo	Oviedo	Carlos Tartiere
Real Betis	Seville	Heliópolis
Real Gijón	Gijón	El Molinón
Real Madrid	Madrid	Santiago Bernabéu
Real Sociedad	San Sebastián	Atocha
Sevilla	Seville	Ramón Sánchez Pizjuán
Valencia	Valencia	Mestalla
Zaragoza	Zaragoza	La Romareda

== League table ==
Pos	Team	Pld	W	D	L	GF	GA	GD	Pts	Qualification or relegation
1	Barcelona (C)	30	24	3	3	96	26	+70	51	Qualification for the European Cup preliminary round
2	Real Madrid	30	21	5	4	89	29	+60	47	Qualification for the European Cup round of 16 (Note: Real Madrid qualified directly to the round of 16 as title holders.)
3	Atlético Bilbao	30	17	2	11	72	33	+39	36	
4	Valencia	30	13	7	10	47	41	+6	33	
5	Atlético Madrid	30	13	6	11	58	48	+10	32	
6	Real Betis	30	14	4	12	54	53	+1	32	
7	Español	30	11	7	12	42	45	−3	29	
8	Osasuna	30	12	4	14	44	59	−15	28	
9	Zaragoza	30	12	4	14	47	60	−13	28	
10	Real Sociedad	30	9	10	11	32	33	−1	28	
11	Oviedo	30	11	5	14	31	49	−18	27	
12	Sevilla	30	12	2	16	44	58	−14	26	
13	Granada (O)	30	11	4	15	30	43	−13	26	Qualification for the relegation play-offs
14	Las Palmas (O)	30	10	4	16	43	69	−26	24	Qualification for the relegation play-offs
15	Real Gijón (R)	30	7	6	17	25	70	−45	20	Relegation to the Segunda División
16	Celta Vigo (R)	30	4	5	21	21	59	−38	13	Relegation to the Segunda División

Source: BDFútbol
Rules for classification: 1) Points; 2) Head-to-head results; 3) Goal difference; 4) Number of goals scored
(C) Champions; (O) Play-off winners; (R) Relegated

== Results ==
Home \ Away	ATB	ATM	BAR	CEL	ESP	GRA	LPA	OSA	OVI	BET	GIJ	RMA	RSO	SEV	VAL	ZAR
Atlético Bilbao	—	1–2	1–2	9–0	4–1	3–0	3–0	3–1	0–1	7–0	9–0	4–1	1–0	2–1	2–1	3–2
Atlético Madrid	0–1	—	1–1	3–1	3–2	4–0	3–1	2–0	2–0	3–1	1–1	2–1	2–0	5–0	1–2	7–1
Barcelona	3–0	5–0	—	2–0	5–3	3–0	5–1	6–1	7–1	4–1	4–1	4–0	4–2	4–0	6–0	3–0
Celta	0–3	0–1	0–1	—	1–2	3–0	0–0	3–0	1–1	1–1	1–0	2–4	0–0	0–1	1–2	2–0
Español	2–1	2–2	0–3	2–1	—	1–0	1–1	2–2	2–0	2–0	2–0	2–0	2–0	1–2	2–0	1–1
Granada	1–0	1–0	1–4	2–0	1–1	—	4–1	1–0	1–1	0–0	6–0	0–3	1–0	1–0	1–0	4–1
Las Palmas	1–0	2–2	0–2	3–1	1–2	1–0	—	5–1	2–1	2–0	4–0	1–2	0–0	3–0	2–4	3–1
Osasuna	1–8	3–1	2–2	4–0	2–1	2–1	2–0	—	1–0	3–0	4–1	1–2	2–1	2–2	0–3	3–0
Oviedo	1–2	2–1	2–4	1–0	1–0	1–0	2–1	1–3	—	0–3	2–0	0–2	1–1	1–0	1–1	4–1
Real Betis	4–0	3–2	2–5	2–1	3–1	2–1	2–0	1–0	2–0	—	5–3	2–3	0–1	2–0	1–1	7–0
Real Gijón	0–2	3–2	2–1	2–2	1–0	0–1	2–0	2–1	0–3	1–1	—	0–0	1–0	0–4	2–1	0–2
Real Madrid	0–0	5–0	1–0	3–0	3–3	2–0	10–1	8–0	4–0	4–2	5–1	—	6–1	8–0	3–0	3–0
Real Sociedad	1–1	0–0	1–1	3–0	2–1	3–1	6–2	0–2	1–1	3–1	0–0	0–0	—	4–0	0–0	1–0
Sevilla	3–2	3–3	0–2	2–0	3–0	3–0	3–4	1–0	4–0	2–4	3–0	1–3	0–1	—	1–0	3–1
Valencia	2–0	4–2	1–2	3–0	1–1	3–0	5–1	0–0	1–2	2–0	2–0	1–1	2–0	1–0	—	3–3
Zaragoza	2–0	2–1	2–1	2–0	1–0	1–1	5–0	2–1	2–0	1–2	2–2	1–2	1–0	4–2	6–1	—

Source: BDFútbol
Legend: Blue = home team win; Yellow = draw; Red = away team win.

== Relegation play-offs ==
Team 1	Agg.	Team 2	1st leg	2nd leg
Granada	6–1	Sabadell	5–0	1–1
Levante	2–3	Las Palmas	1–2	1–1

== Pichichi Trophy ==
Rank	Player	Club	Goals
1	(Spain) Alfredo Di Stéfano	Real Madrid	23
2	(Hungary) Ferenc Puskás	Real Madrid	21
3	(Brazil) Evaristo de Macedo	Barcelona	20
4	(Spain) Justo Tejada	Barcelona	19
5	(Brazil) Vavá	Atlético Madrid	16
6	(Spain) Antoniet	Sevilla FC	15
