= Inter-Cities Fairs Cup =

European annual club football tournament (1955–1971)

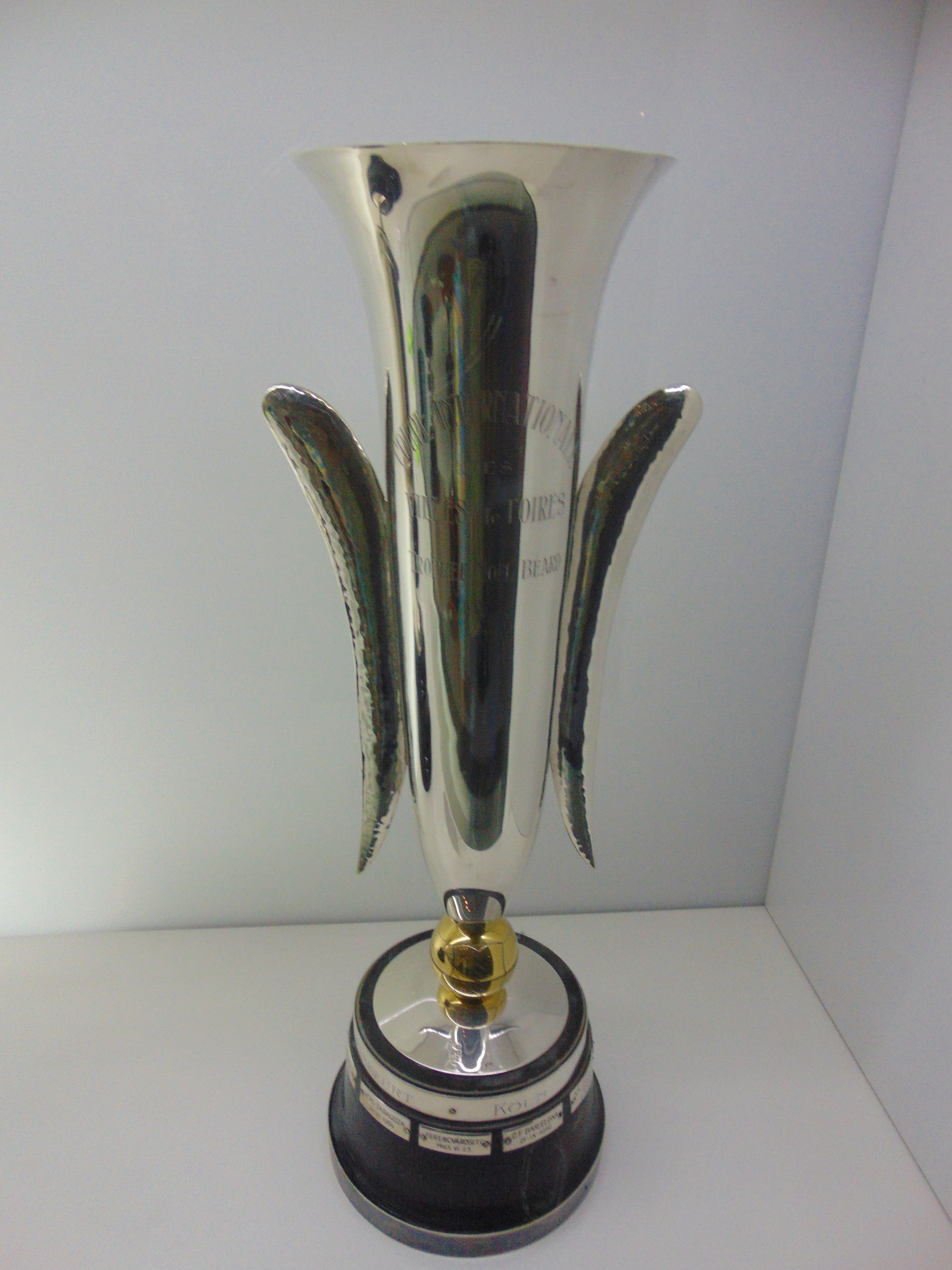
- Fairs Cup Trophy (Barcelona Museum). It bears the French name of the tournament, Coupe Internationale des Villes de Foires ("International Fairs Cities Cup").
- Organiser(s): Fairs Cup Committee
- Founded: 1955; 71 years ago
- Abolished: 1971; 55 years ago
- Region: Europe
- Teams: 12 (first edition); 64 (last edition)
- Related competitions: UEFA Cup (successor)
- Last champions: (England) Leeds United (2nd title)
- Most championships: (Spain) Barcelona (3 titles)

The Inter-Cities Fairs Cup, most commonly referred to as the Fairs Cup and sometimes as the European Fairs Cup or Fairs Cities' Cup, was a European football competition played between 1955 and 1971. The Fairs Cup was the idea of FIFA vice-president and executive committee member Ernst Thommen, Italian Football Federation president and FIFA executive committee member Ottorino Barassi and English Football Association general secretary, Stanley Rous. As the name suggests, the competition was set up to promote international trade fairs.

UEFA refers to the Inter-Cities Fairs Cup as the forerunner to the UEFA Cup, although they don't include it in their official resume. FIFA also considers the Inter-Cities Fairs Cup as a predecessor tournament to the UEFA Cup, even counting it together with the tournament that succeeded it; La Liga, in turn, simply calls it the Europa League.

Games were regularly held between teams from cities holding trade fairs and it was from these games that the competition evolved. Initially, the competition was only open to cities that hosted trade fairs, and where the cities' clubs finished in their national league had no relevance. Early competitions also featured a "one city, one team" rule, with some teams selected from multiple clubs. Due to the one city one club rule, in the first running of the competition, London entered a team that consisted of mixed players from various London clubs.

After 1964, teams qualified based on league position. The winning team received the Noel Beard Trophy (Trophée Noel Beard), named for the cutler who designed it.

The competition was organised by the Fairs Cup Committee which was led by some FIFA executives until 1971, when it was superseded by the UEFA-organised UEFA Cup. According to UEFA general secretary Hans Bangerter, "The competition was very successful but the time came when the UEFA Executive Committee thought that such a major competition should be governed and organised by UEFA itself, which could ensure that standard rules were followed and could deal with refereeing and disciplinary matters."

== History ==
=== Spanish era ===
The first competition was to be held over two seasons to avoid clashes with national leagues fixtures. Because it was also intended to coincide with trade fairs, it ran over into a third year. It commenced in 1955 and finished in 1958. Cities that entered teams included Barcelona, Basel, Birmingham, Copenhagen, Frankfurt, Vienna, Cologne, Lausanne, Leipzig, London, Milan, and Zagreb. The first competition included a group stage and also featured some city representative teams instead of clubs. The eventual finalists were the city of Barcelona, dubbed Barcelona XI, and a London XI. While the latter side consisted of players from 11 clubs, the former was effectively FC Barcelona. After a 2–2 draw at Stamford Bridge, Barcelona emerged triumphant after winning the return 6–0. A second tournament took place between 1958 and 1960. This time, the group stage format was abandoned in favour of a knockout tournament. Barcelona retained the cup, beating Birmingham City 4–1 in the final.

The third tournament was held over the course of the 1960–61 season and all subsequent tournaments were completed over one season. The season also saw the holders, Barcelona, compete in both the Fairs Cup and European Cup. During the early days of European competition, these tournaments were effectively rivals and there was little or no co-ordination between the administrators running them. The European Cup quickly established itself as the premier club competition, largely because it had the advantage of featuring national league champions and was completed in a single season from the very start. The efforts of Barcelona ended in failure in both competitions. In the Fairs Cup quarter-finals, they lost 7–6 on aggregate to Hibernian, while in the European Cup, they were beaten in the final by Benfica. Roma took three games to beat Hibernian in the semi-finals before they progressed to the final. Birmingham City reached their second final in two years but once again they were defeated. After a 2–2 draw at home, they lost 2–0 to Roma in the return.

The 1961–62 season saw the rules amended to allow three teams from each country to enter. The "one city, one team" rule was abandoned and two teams represented each of Edinburgh, Milan, and Barcelona (respectively Hibernian and Heart of Midlothian, Internazionale and A.C. Milan, and FC Barcelona and RCD Espanyol). This increase in teams resulted in Spanish teams continuing to dominate the competition. FC Barcelona were now regularly joined by Valencia CF and Zaragoza. These three clubs won the competition six times between them from 1958 to 1966. The Fairs Cup saw three all-Spanish finals in 1962, 1964, and 1966. The 1962 final saw Valencia CF beat FC Barcelona 7–3 on aggregate and in 1963 they retained the title after beating Dinamo Zagreb with a 4–1 aggregate score. They reached their third final in 1964 but lost 2–1 to Zaragoza in a single game at the Camp Nou.

The 1965 tournament saw a record entry of 48 teams, testimony to the growing status of the Fairs Cup. It also produced only the second final not to feature a Spanish team. Ferencvárosi TC of Hungary beat Juventus in another single-game final. The 1966 competition attracted attention for all the wrong reasons. Chelsea were pelted with rubbish at Roma and Leeds United fought a bruising encounter with Valencia CF which ended with three dismissals. Leeds also had Johnny Giles sent off in the semi-final against Zaragoza. The final saw FC Barcelona beat Zaragoza 4–3 on aggregate.

=== English era ===
The 1967 tournament saw the emergence of English clubs with Leeds United reaching the final. Although they lost to Dinamo Zagreb, they returned the following season and defeated Ferencvárosi TC to become the first English club to win the competition. The subsequent victories of Newcastle United and Arsenal and a second win for Leeds United saw English clubs winning the last four Fairs Cup tournaments. The last final saw Leeds United declared winners on away goals after drawing with Juventus 3–3 on aggregate.

=== UEFA Cup ===
In the 1971–72 season the competition was abolished and replaced by the UEFA Cup after UEFA revised the entry regulations and concluded that the "one city, one team" rule related with the Fairs Cup must be abolished, which had had a particularly bad effect on English entrants for 1969–70, when Liverpool (2nd), Arsenal (4th), Southampton (7th), and Newcastle United (9th-also holders) got the places, at the expense of Everton (3rd), Chelsea (5th), Tottenham Hotspur (6th), and West Ham United (8th). The Football League upheld the geographic rule until 1975, when UEFA pressured the League to drop it or face sanctions. Everton that year, having come 4th, would have been excluded from the competition due to Liverpool's 2nd-place finish.

== Finals ==
Keys

- aet: after extra time
- Aggregate score result

Ed.	Season	Champion	Runner-up	Score	Venue	City	Attend.
1	1955–58	(Spain) Barcelona XI (Note: FC Barcelona participated in this first edition of the tournament representing the city of Barcelona, under the name "Barcelona XI", and using, not the colours of the club, but the colours of the city.)	(England) London XI	2–2	Stamford Bridge	London	45,466
1	1955–58	(Spain) Barcelona XI	(England) London XI	6–0	Camp Nou	Barcelona	70,000
1	1955–58	(Spain) Barcelona XI	(England) London XI	8–2			
2	1958–60	(Spain) Barcelona	(England) Birmingham City	0–0	St Andrew's	Birmingham	40,524
2	1958–60	(Spain) Barcelona	(England) Birmingham City	4–1	Camp Nou	Barcelona	70,000
2	1958–60	(Spain) Barcelona	(England) Birmingham City	4–1			
3	1960–61	(Italy) Roma	(England) Birmingham City	2–2	St Andrew's	Birmingham	21,000
3	1960–61	(Italy) Roma	(England) Birmingham City	2–0	Stadio Olimpico	Rome	60,000
3	1960–61	(Italy) Roma	(England) Birmingham City	4–2			
4	1961–62	(Spain) Valencia	(Spain) Barcelona	6–2	Mestalla Stadium	Valencia	65,000
4	1961–62	(Spain) Valencia	(Spain) Barcelona	1–1	Camp Nou	Barcelona	60,000
4	1961–62	(Spain) Valencia	(Spain) Barcelona	7–3			
5	1962–63	(Spain) Valencia	(Socialist Federal Republic of Yugoslavia) Dinamo Zagreb	2–1	Stadion Maksimir	Zagreb	40,000
5	1962–63	(Spain) Valencia	(Socialist Federal Republic of Yugoslavia) Dinamo Zagreb	2–0	Mestalla Stadium	Valencia	55,000
5	1962–63	(Spain) Valencia	(Socialist Federal Republic of Yugoslavia) Dinamo Zagreb	4–1			
6	1963–64	(Spain) Zaragoza	(Spain) Valencia	2–1	Camp Nou	Barcelona	50,000
7	1964–65	(Hungary) Ferencváros	(Italy) Juventus	1–0	Stadio Comunale	Turin	40,000
8	1965–66	(Spain) Barcelona	(Spain) Zaragoza	0–1	Camp Nou	Barcelona	50,000
8	1965–66	(Spain) Barcelona	(Spain) Zaragoza	4–2 (a.e.t.)	La Romareda	Zaragoza	33,000
8	1965–66	(Spain) Barcelona	(Spain) Zaragoza	4–3			
9	1966–67	(Socialist Federal Republic of Yugoslavia) Dinamo Zagreb	(England) Leeds United	2–0	Stadion Maksimir	Zagreb	32,000
9	1966–67	(Socialist Federal Republic of Yugoslavia) Dinamo Zagreb	(England) Leeds United	0–0	Elland Road	Leeds	35,604
9	1966–67	(Socialist Federal Republic of Yugoslavia) Dinamo Zagreb	(England) Leeds United	2–0			
10	1967–68	(England) Leeds United	(Hungary) Ferencváros	1–0	Elland Road	Leeds	25,268
10	1967–68	(England) Leeds United	(Hungary) Ferencváros	0–0	Népstadion	Budapest	76,000
10	1967–68	(England) Leeds United	(Hungary) Ferencváros	1–0			
11	1968–69	(England) Newcastle United	(Hungary) Újpest	3–0	St James' Park	Newcastle	60,000
11	1968–69	(England) Newcastle United	(Hungary) Újpest	3–2	Megyeri út	Budapest	37,000
11	1968–69	(England) Newcastle United	(Hungary) Újpest	6–2			
12	1969–70	(England) Arsenal	(Belgium) Anderlecht	1–3	Constant Vanden Stock	Anderlecht	37,000
12	1969–70	(England) Arsenal	(Belgium) Anderlecht	3–0	Highbury	London	51,612
12	1969–70	(England) Arsenal	(Belgium) Anderlecht	4–3			
13	1970–71	(England) Leeds United	(Italy) Juventus	2–2	Stadio Comunale	Turin	58,555
13	1970–71	(England) Leeds United	(Italy) Juventus	1–1	Elland Road	Leeds	42,483
13	1970–71	(England) Leeds United	(Italy) Juventus	3–3	Leeds United won on away goals.		

== Trophy play-off match ==
After the 1970–71 tournament, the last of the Fairs Cup, the competition was abolished and replaced with the UEFA Cup.

The Fairs Cup trophy had not been won by any club permanently, so a play-off match was organised to decide who would gain permanent possession of the original competition trophy. Before the match, then FIFA President Sir Stanley Rous presented silver insignia to the members of the 1958 title-winning side, FC Barcelona.

The one-off match was played on 22 September 1971, between the first ever Fairs Cup winners, Barcelona, and the last winners, Leeds United. Barcelona won this play-off 2–1.

Year	Champion	Score	Runner-up	Venue	City	Attend.
1971	(Spain) Barcelona	2–1	(England) Leeds United	Camp Nou	Barcelona	45,000

== Performances ==
=== By club ===
Club	Winners	Runners-up	Winning years	Runner-up years
(Spain) Barcelona	3	1	1958, 1960, 1966	1962
(Spain) Valencia	2	1	1962, 1963	1964
(England) Leeds United	2	1	1968, 1971	1967
(Spain) Zaragoza	1	1	1964	1966
(Hungary) Ferencváros	1	1	1965	1968
(Socialist Federal Republic of Yugoslavia) Dinamo Zagreb	1	1	1967	1963
(Italy) Roma	1	0	1961	
(England) Newcastle United	1	0	1969	
(England) Arsenal	1	0	1970	
(England) Birmingham City	0	2		1960, 1961
(Italy) Juventus	0	2		1965, 1971
(England) London XI	0	1		1958
(Hungary) Újpest	0	1		1969
(Belgium) Anderlecht	0	1		1970

=== By nation ===
Nation	Winners	Runners-up	Total
Spain	6	3	9
England	4	4	8
Italy	1	2	3
Hungary	1	2	3
Yugoslavia	1	1	2
Belgium	0	1	1

=== All-time top scorers ===
Rank	Player	Goals	Club(s)
1	(Brazil) Waldo	31	(Spain) Valencia
2	(Scotland) Peter Lorimer	20	(England) Leeds United
3	(Hungary) Flórián Albert	19	(Hungary) Ferencváros
3	(Hungary) Ferenc Bene	19	(Hungary) Újpest
3	(Spain) José Antonio Zaldúa	19	(Spain) Barcelona
6	(Argentina) Pedro Manfredini	18	(Italy) Roma
7	(Brazil) Evaristo	17	(Spain) Barcelona
8	(Spain) Vicente Guillot	16	(Spain) Valencia
9	(Spain) Marcelino	15	(Spain) Zaragoza
10	(Uruguay) Héctor Núñez	14	(Spain) Valencia

=== Top scorers by season ===
Season	Player(s)	Goals	Club(s)
1955–58	(Brazil) Evaristo	4	(Spain) Barcelona
1955–58	(Spain) Justo Tejada	4	(Spain) Barcelona
1955–58	(England) Peter Murphy	4	(England) Birmingham City
1955–58	(England) Cliff Holton	4	(England) London XI
1955–58	(Switzerland) Norbert Eschmann	4	(Switzerland) Lausanne-Sport
1958–60	(Socialist Federal Republic of Yugoslavia) Bora Kostić	6	(Socialist Federal Republic of Yugoslavia) Belgrade XI
1960–61	(Argentina) Pedro Manfredini	12	(Italy) Roma
1961–62	(Brazil) Waldo	9	(Spain) Valencia
1962–63	(Italy) Francisco Lojacono	6	(Italy) Roma
1962–63	(Argentina) Pedro Manfredini	6	(Italy) Roma
1962–63	(Brazil) Waldo	6	(Spain) Valencia
1963–64	(Brazil) Waldo	6	(Spain) Valencia
1964–65	(England) Bobby Charlton	8	(England) Manchester United
1964–65	(Scotland) Denis Law	8	(England) Manchester United
1965–66	(Spain) José Antonio Zaldúa	8	(Spain) Barcelona
1966–67	(Hungary) Flórián Albert	8	(Hungary) Ferencváros
1967–68	(Scotland) Peter Lorimer	8	(England) Leeds United
1968–69	(Hungary) Antal Dunai	10	(Hungary) Újpest
1969–70	(Belgium) Paul Van Himst	10	(Belgium) Anderlecht
1970–71	(Italy) Pietro Anastasi	10	(Italy) Juventus

Source: rsssf.com

== Bibliography ==
- Vieli, André (2014). UEFA: 60 years at the heart of football (PDF). Nyon: Union des Associations Européennes de Football. p. 45. doi:10.22005/bcu.175315. Archived (PDF) from the original on 3 August 2021.
