= 1949–50 Birmingham City F.C. season =

Birmingham City F.C.
1949–50 season
- Chairman: Harry Morris Jr
- Manager: Bob Brocklebank
- Ground: St Andrew's
- Football League First Division: 22nd
- FA Cup: Third round (eliminated by Swansea Town)
- Top goalscorer: League: Jimmy Dailey (9); All: Jimmy Dailey (9)
- Highest home attendance: 46,945 vs West Bromwich Albion, 24 August 1950
- Lowest home attendance: 20,168 vs Fulham, 19 November 1950
- Average home league attendance: 34,511
Home colours

The 1949–50 Football League season was Birmingham City Football Club's 47th in the Football League and their 28th in the First Division. They were bottom of the 22-team division by the end of August, a position which they retained for all but three weeks of the season, so were relegated to the Second Division for 1950–51. They entered the 1949–50 FA Cup at the third round proper and lost in that round to Swansea Town.

Twenty-nine players made at least one appearance in nationally organised competition, and there were nine different goalscorers. Goalkeeper Gil Merrick was ever-present in the 43-game season, and Jimmy Dailey was leading goalscorer with only nine goals, all scored in the league.

== Football League First Division ==
| Date | League position | Opponents | Venue | Result | Score F–A | Scorers | Attendance |
|---|---|---|---|---|---|---|---|
| 20 August 1949 | 17th | Chelsea | H | L | 0–3 | | 45,068 |
| 24 August 1949 | 13th | West Bromwich Albion | H | W | 2–0 | Dailey 2 | 46,945 |
| 27 August 1949 | 20th | Stoke City | A | L | 1–3 | Capel | 28,119 |
| 31 August 1949 | 22nd | West Bromwich Albion | A | L | 0–3 | | 50,365 |
| 3 September 1949 | 22nd | Burnley | H | L | 0–1 | | 36,341 |
| 10 September 1949 | 22nd | Sunderland | A | D | 1–1 | Dailey | 48,552 |
| 14 September 1949 | 22nd | Wolverhampton Wanderers | H | D | 1–1 | Dailey | 46,433 |
| 17 September 1949 | 22nd | Liverpool | H | L | 2–3 | Brennan, Dailey | 37,859 |
| 24 September 1949 | 22nd | Arsenal | A | L | 2–4 | Berry 2 | 50,850 |
| 1 October 1949 | 22nd | Bolton Wanderers | H | D | 0–0 | | 33,142 |
| 8 October 1949 | 22nd | Portsmouth | H | L | 0–3 | | 37,944 |
| 15 October 1949 | 22nd | Huddersfield Town | A | L | 0–1 | | 22,872 |
| 22 October 1949 | 22nd | Everton | H | D | 0–0 | | 32,209 |
| 29 October 1949 | 22nd | Middlesbrough | A | L | 0–1 | | 33,214 |
| 5 November 1949 | 22nd | Blackpool | H | L | 0–2 | | 34,045 |
| 12 November 1949 | 22nd | Newcastle United | A | L | 1–3 | Slater | 30,113 |
| 19 November 1949 | 22nd | Fulham | H | D | 1–1 | Brennan | 20,168 |
| 26 November 1949 | 22nd | Manchester City | A | L | 0–4 | | 30,617 |
| 3 December 1949 | 22nd | Charlton Athletic | H | W | 2–0 | Stewart, Berry | 28,489 |
| 10 December 1949 | 22nd | Aston Villa | A | D | 1–1 | Brennan | 45,008 |
| 17 December 1949 | 22nd | Chelsea | A | L | 0–3 | | 28,672 |
| 24 December 1949 | 22nd | Stoke City | H | W | 1–0 | Higgins | 28,728 |
| 26 December 1949 | 22nd | Derby County | H | D | 2–2 | Capel, Stewart | 45,477 |
| 27 December 1949 | 22nd | Derby County | A | L | 1–4 | Brennan | 36,459 |
| 31 December 1949 | 22nd | Burnley | A | D | 1–1 | Dailey | 25,473 |
| 14 January 1950 | 22nd | Sunderland | H | L | 1–2 | Dailey | 32,095 |
| 21 January 1950 | 22nd | Liverpool | A | L | 0–2 | | 37,668 |
| 4 February 1950 | 22nd | Arsenal | H | W | 2–1 | Dailey, Brennan | 34,031 |
| 18 February 1950 | 22nd | Bolton Wanderers | A | L | 0–1 | | 30,383 |
| 25 February 1950 | 22nd | Portsmouth | A | L | 0–2 | | 28,051 |
| 4 March 1950 | 22nd | Huddersfield Town | H | W | 2–1 | Dailey, Brennan | 26,230 |
| 11 March 1950 | 22nd | Fulham | A | D | 0–0 | | 24,975 |
| 18 March 1950 | 22nd | Manchester City | H | W | 1–0 | Brennan | 29,967 |
| 25 March 1950 | 21st | Blackpool | A | D | 1–1 | Stewart | 20,733 |
| 1 April 1950 | 21st | Newcastle United | H | L | 0–1 | | 37,249 |
| 7 April 1950 | 21st | Manchester United | A | W | 2–0 | Stewart, Berry | 48,991 |
| 8 April 1950 | 21st | Everton | A | D | 0–0 | | 46,828 |
| 10 April 1950 | 21st | Manchester United | H | D | 0–0 | | 35,868 |
| 15 April 1950 | 22nd | Middlesbrough | H | D | 0–0 | | 31,579 |
| 22 April 1950 | 22nd | Charlton Athletic | A | L | 0–2 | | 42,424 |
| 29 April 1950 | 22nd | Aston Villa | H | D | 2–2 | Trigg 2 | 24,866 |
| 6 May 1950 | 22nd | Wolverhampton Wanderers | A | L | 1–6 | Trigg | 42,935 |

=== League table (part) ===
Final First Division table (part)
| Pos | Club | Pld | W | D | L | F | A | GA | Pts |
|---|---|---|---|---|---|---|---|---|---|
| 18th | Everton | 42 | 10 | 14 | 18 | 42 | 66 | 0.66 | 34 |
| 19th | Stoke City | 42 | 11 | 12 | 19 | 47 | 75 | 0.64 | 34 |
| 20th | Charlton Athletic | 42 | 13 | 6 | 23 | 53 | 65 | 0.81 | 32 |
| 21st | Manchester City | 42 | 8 | 13 | 21 | 36 | 68 | 0.53 | 29 |
| 22nd | Birmingham City | 42 | 7 | 14 | 21 | 31 | 67 | 0.46 | 28 |
| Key | Pos = League position; Pld = Matches played; W = Matches won; D = Matches drawn; L = Matches lost; F = Goals for; A = Goals against; GA = Goal average; Pts = Points | | | | | | | | |
| Source | | | | | | | | | |

== FA Cup ==
| Round | Date | Opponents | Venue | Result | Score F–A | Scorers | Attendance |
|---|---|---|---|---|---|---|---|
| Third round | 7 January 1950 | Swansea Town | A | L | 0–3 | | 18,990 |

== Appearances and goals ==
Players marked † left the club during the playing season.
Key to positions: GK – Goalkeeper; FB – Full back; HB – Half back; FW – Forward

Players' appearances and goals by competition
| Pos. | Nat. | Name | League | | FA Cup | | Total | |
| Pos. | Nat. | Name | Apps | Goals | Apps | Goals | Apps | Goals |
|---|---|---|---|---|---|---|---|---|
| GK | ENG | Gil Merrick | 42 | 0 | 1 | 0 | 43 | 0 |
| FB | ENG | Jack Badham | 28 | 0 | 1 | 0 | 29 | 0 |
| FB | ENG | Tony Blake | 2 | 0 | 0 | 0 | 2 | 0 |
| FB | ENG | Ken Green | 29 | 0 | 1 | 0 | 30 | 0 |
| FB | ENG | Dennis Jennings | 25 | 0 | 1 | 0 | 26 | 0 |
| HB | ENG | Arthur Atkins | 20 | 0 | 0 | 0 | 20 | 0 |
| HB | ENG | Len Boyd | 27 | 0 | 0 | 0 | 27 | 0 |
| HB | ENG | Derek Carr | 3 | 0 | 1 | 0 | 4 | 0 |
| HB | ENG | Don Dorman | 16 | 0 | 1 | 0 | 17 | 0 |
| HB | ENG | Ted Duckhouse | 15 | 0 | 0 | 0 | 15 | 0 |
| HB | NIR | Ray Ferris | 25 | 0 | 0 | 0 | 25 | 0 |
| HB | ENG | Fred Harris | 12 | 0 | 0 | 0 | 12 | 0 |
| HB | ENG | Martin McDonnell † | 10 | 0 | 0 | 0 | 10 | 0 |
| FW | ENG | Johnny Berry | 39 | 4 | 1 | 0 | 40 | 4 |
| FW | NIR | Bobby Brennan | 39 | 7 | 1 | 0 | 40 | 7 |
| FW | ENG | Tommy Capel † | 8 | 2 | 0 | 0 | 8 | 2 |
| FW | SCO | Jimmy Dailey | 23 | 9 | 1 | 0 | 24 | 9 |
| FW | WAL | Hugh Evans | 9 | 0 | 1 | 0 | 10 | 0 |
| FW | ZAF | Willie Havenga | 1 | 0 | 0 | 0 | 1 | 0 |
| FW | IRL | Jim Higgins | 8 | 1 | 0 | 0 | 8 | 1 |
| FW | ENG | Johnny Jordan | 15 | 0 | 0 | 0 | 15 | 0 |
| FW | SCO | Bobby Laing | 1 | 0 | 0 | 0 | 1 | 0 |
| FW | SCO | Frank McKee | 8 | 0 | 0 | 0 | 8 | 0 |
| FW | IRL | Eddie O'Hara | 2 | 0 | 0 | 0 | 2 | 0 |
| FW | ENG | Harold Roberts | 7 | 0 | 1 | 0 | 8 | 0 |
| FW | ENG | Fred Slater | 2 | 1 | 0 | 0 | 2 | 1 |
| FW | SCO | Jackie Stewart | 31 | 4 | 0 | 0 | 1 | 4 |
| FW | ENG | Cyril Trigg | 12 | 3 | 0 | 0 | 12 | 3 |
| FW | ENG | Roy Warhurst | 3 | 0 | 0 | 0 | 3 | 0 |

== See also ==
- Birmingham City F.C. seasons
