= 1950–51 Birmingham City F.C. season =

Birmingham City F.C.
1950–51 season
- Chairman: Harry Morris Jr
- Manager: Bob Brocklebank
- Ground: St Andrew's
- Football League Second Division: 4th
- FA Cup: Semi-final (eliminated by Blackpool)
- Top goalscorer: League: Cyril Trigg (17); All: Cyril Trigg (19)
- Highest home attendance: 50,764 vs Manchester United, FA Cup sixth round, 24 February 1951
- Lowest home attendance: 12,593 vs Southampton, 28 February 1951
- Average home league attendance: 25,333
Home colours

The 1950–51 Football League season was Birmingham City Football Club's 48th in the Football League and their 20th in the Second Division, having been relegated from the First Division in 1949–50. They finished in 4th position in the 22-team division. They entered the 1950–51 FA Cup at the third round proper and reached the semi-final, in which they lost to Blackpool after a replay.

Twenty-two players made at least one appearance in nationally organised competitive football during the season, and there were thirteen different goalscorers. Goalkeeper Gil Merrick, full-back Arthur Atkins and winger Johnny Berry were ever-present in the 48-game season, and Cyril Trigg was the leading goalscorer with 19 goals, of which 17 came in league matches.

As part of the Festival of Britain, friendly matches were arranged at the end of this season between British clubs and teams from other parts of the British Isles and from continental Europe. Birmingham played in four such matches, against teams from Scotland, Ireland and Yugoslavia.

== Football League Second Division ==
Note that not all teams completed their playing season on the same day. Birmingham were in third position after their last game of the season, on 28 April, but by the time the last game was played, on 5 May, they had been overtaken by Cardiff City and finished fourth, three points behind the promotion places.

| Date | League position | Opponents | Venue | Result | Score F–A | Scorers | Attendance |
|---|---|---|---|---|---|---|---|
| 19 August 1950 | 1st | Swansea Town | A | W | 1–0 | Boyd | 25,012 |
| 23 August 1950 | 1st | Leicester City | H | W | 2–0 | Trigg, Smith | 28,343 |
| 26 August 1950 | 4th | Grimsby Town | H | D | 1–1 | Powell | 33,017 |
| 28 August 1950 | 1st | Leicester City | A | W | 3–1 | Trigg, Smith, Stewart | 31,291 |
| 2 September 1950 | 1st | Notts County | A | W | 1–0 | Smith | 34,648 |
| 6 September 1950 | 1st | Coventry City | H | D | 1–1 | Higgins | 24,719 |
| 9 September 1950 | 1st | Preston North End | H | W | 1–0 | Smith | 32,633 |
| 11 September 1950 | 2nd | Coventry City | A | L | 1–3 | Berry | 30,448 |
| 16 September 1950 | 5th | Bury | A | L | 1–4 | Dorman | 16,809 |
| 23 September 1950 | 5th | Queens Park Rangers | H | D | 1–1 | Heath og | 26,583 |
| 30 September 1950 | 4th | Chesterfield | A | D | 1–1 | Trigg | 12,330 |
| 7 October 1950 | 4th | Southampton | A | W | 2–0 | Smith, Green | 25,499 |
| 14 October 1950 | 3rd | Barnsley | H | W | 2–0 | Smith, Boyd | 26,617 |
| 21 October 1950 | 4th | Brentford | A | L | 1–2 | Trigg | 19,273 |
| 28 October 1950 | 3rd | Blackburn Rovers | H | W | 3–2 | Trigg, Smith, Stewart | 24,552 |
| 4 November 1950 | 4th | Hull City | A | L | 2–3 | Trigg 2 | 32,038 |
| 11 November 1950 | 5th | Doncaster Rovers | H | L | 0–2 | | 26,779 |
| 18 November 1950 | 5th | Sheffield United | A | L | 2–3 | Smith, Stewart | 23,879 |
| 25 November 1950 | 5th | Luton Town | H | W | 3–0 | Higgins 2, Smith | 18,606 |
| 2 December 1950 | 7th | Leeds United | A | L | 0–3 | | 23,355 |
| 9 December 1950 | 6th | West Ham United | H | W | 3–1 | Higgins, Stewart, Smith | 18,180 |
| 16 December 1950 | 4th | Swansea Town | H | W | 5–0 | Trigg 3, Stewart, Berry | 15,649 |
| 23 December 1950 | 4th | Grimsby Town | A | D | 1–1 | Smith | 13,141 |
| 25 December 1950 | 6th | Manchester City | A | L | 1–3 | Trigg | 40,173 |
| 26 December 1950 | 4th | Manchester City | H | W | 1–0 | Trigg | 32,092 |
| 30 December 1950 | 5th | Notts County | H | L | 1–4 | Stewart | 33,770 |
| 13 January 1951 | 7th | Preston North End | A | L | 0–1 | | 30,662 |
| 20 January 1951 | 7th | Bury | H | D | 3–3 | Trigg 2, Stewart | 25,653 |
| 3 February 1951 | 9th | Queens Park Rangers | A | L | 0–2 | | 12,295 |
| 17 February 1951 | 7th | Chesterfield | H | W | 2–1 | Trigg, Higgins | 33,768 |
| 28 February 1951 | 7th | Southampton | H | W | 2–1 | Trigg, Stewart | 12,593 |
| 3 March 1951 | 5th | Barnsley | A | W | 2–0 | Dailey, Stewart | 15,450 |
| 17 March 1951 | 5th | Blackburn Rovers | A | W | 3–2 | Dailey 2, Higgins | 28,116 |
| 23 March 1951 | 5th | Cardiff City | H | D | 0–0 | | 15,054 |
| 24 March 1951 | 4th | Hull City | H | W | 2–1 | Dailey, Boyd | 27,512 |
| 26 March 1951 | 5th | Cardiff City | A | L | 1–2 | Rowley | 36,992 |
| 31 March 1951 | 5th | Doncaster Rovers | A | W | 1–0 | Trigg | 16,091 |
| 7 April 1951 | 3rd | Sheffield United | H | W | 3–0 | Higgins, Rowley, Warhurst | 21,974 |
| 14 April 1951 | 4th | Luton Town | A | D | 1–1 | Warhurst | 16,324 |
| 21 April 1951 | 4th | Leeds United | H | L | 0–1 | | 23,809 |
| 25 April 1951 | 4th | Brentford | H | D | 1–1 | Smith | 13,643 |
| 28 April 1951 | 3rd | West Ham United | A | W | 2–1 | Rowley, Ferris | 12,396 |

=== League table (part) ===
Final Second Division table (part)
| Pos | Club | Pld | W | D | L | F | A | GA | Pts |
|---|---|---|---|---|---|---|---|---|---|
| 2nd | Manchester City | 42 | 19 | 14 | 9 | 89 | 61 | 1.46 | 52 |
| 3rd | Cardiff City | 42 | 17 | 16 | 9 | 53 | 45 | 1.18 | 50 |
| 4th | Birmingham City | 42 | 20 | 9 | 13 | 64 | 53 | 1.21 | 49 |
| 5th | Leeds United | 42 | 20 | 8 | 14 | 63 | 55 | 1.15 | 48 |
| 6th | Blackburn Rovers | 42 | 19 | 8 | 15 | 65 | 66 | 0.98 | 46 |
| Key | Pos = League position; Pld = Matches played; W = Matches won; D = Matches drawn; L = Matches lost; F = Goals for; A = Goals against; GA = Goal average; Pts = Points | | | | | | | | |
| Source | | | | | | | | | |

== FA Cup ==
Birmingham beat Manchester City, Bristol City, and First Division teams Derby County and Manchester United, without needing a replay and while conceding only one goal, to reach the semi-final, in which they faced another First Division team, Blackpool. The Times suggested that the fixture, "as always when Matthews plays, will present the problem of how to smother the greatest player in the history of English football", warning that "to smother Matthews—should they even succeed—is not to smother Blackpool." Supporters queued all night for tickets; the 20,000 allocation sold out within two hours. In addition to several special trains, the supporters' club chartered 60 coaches to travel to Maine Road, Manchester, where touts were offering tickets for sale at four times face value.

Blackpool were the class team, but "Birmingham, with their fiery, quick tackling, their spirit and the snapping up of stray chances, have swept class aside before now." Though failing to sweep Blackpool aside, they did stop them scoring, combatting the attacking threat by switching the pacy Jack Badham to the left to man-mark Matthews and using the other defenders, among whom Arthur Atkins stood out, to cut out his crosses. With two minutes left, Jackie Stewart's "terrific left-foot shot struck a post, then passed out, with thousands of horrified Blackpool supporters on the verge of doing likewise."

In the replay, at Goodison Park in front of a 70,000 crowd, "the greatest mystery of all was why the Blackpool inside forwards did not run up a total of five or six goals in the opening hour—to put it conservatively", with Matthews in "his finest form". They scored twice, but within a minute of the second, Bill Smith pulled one back after Johnny Berry's corner rebounded from a post. In the remainder of the match, Birmingham rallied, with shots from all parts; "Blackpool weathered the storm they had brought upon themselves, but how gallantly had Birmingham died."

| Round | Date | Opponents | Venue | Result | Score F–A | Scorers | Attendance |
|---|---|---|---|---|---|---|---|
| Third round | 6 January 1951 | Manchester City | H | W | 2–0 | Stewart, Higgins | 30,057 |
| Fourth round | 27 January 1951 | Derby County | A | W | 3–1 | Stewart, Trigg, Smith | 37,384 |
| Fifth round | 10 February 1951 | Bristol City | H | W | 2–0 | Stewart, Trigg | 47,831 |
| Sixth round | 24 February 1951 | Manchester United | H | W | 1–0 | Higgins | 50,764 |
| Semi-final | 10 March 1951 | Blackpool | Maine Road, Manchester | D | 0–0 | | 71,890 |
| Semi-final replay | 14 March 1951 | Blackpool | Goodison Park, Liverpool | L | 1–2 | Smith | 70,114 |

== Festival of Britain ==
As part of the Festival of Britain, friendly matches were arranged at the end of this season between British clubs and against teams from continental Europe. Birmingham played in four such matches, against teams from Scotland, Ireland and Yugoslavia.

| Date | Opponents | Venue | Result | Score F–A | Scorers | Attendance |
|---|---|---|---|---|---|---|
| 7 May 1951 | Airdrieonians | H | L | 3–5 | Berry 2, Kelly og | 7,985 |
| 12 May 1951 | Dinamo (Yugoslavia) | H | L | 0–2 | | 12,058 |
| 18 May 1951 | Home Farm (Dublin) | A | W | 2–1 | Stewart, Berry | 3,000 |
| 20 May 1951 | Cork Athletic | A | W | 5–2 | Trigg 2, Higgins, Stewart, Dailey | 2,750 |

== Appearances and goals ==
Players marked † left the club during the playing season.
Key to positions: GK – Goalkeeper; FB – Full back; HB – Half back; FW – Forward

Players' appearances and goals by competition
| Pos. | Nat. | Name | League | | FA Cup | | Total | |
| Pos. | Nat. | Name | Apps | Goals | Apps | Goals | Apps | Goals |
|---|---|---|---|---|---|---|---|---|
| GK | ENG | Gil Merrick | 42 | 0 | 6 | 0 | 48 | 0 |
| FB | ENG | Jack Badham | 35 | 0 | 5 | 0 | 40 | 0 |
| FB | ENG | Ken Green | 39 | 1 | 4 | 0 | 43 | 1 |
| FB | ENG | Jeff Hall | 1 | 0 | 0 | 0 | 1 | 0 |
| FB | SCO | Roy Martin | 10 | 0 | 3 | 0 | 13 | 0 |
| HB | ENG | Arthur Atkins | 42 | 0 | 6 | 0 | 48 | 0 |
| HB | ENG | Len Boyd | 36 | 3 | 6 | 0 | 42 | 3 |
| HB | ENG | Don Dorman | 21 | 1 | 1 | 0 | 22 | 1 |
| HB | NIR | Ray Ferris | 20 | 1 | 6 | 0 | 26 | 1 |
| FW | ZAF | Hymie Kloner † | 1 | 0 | 0 | 0 | 1 | 0 |
| FW | SCO | Frank McKee | 3 | 0 | 0 | 0 | 3 | 0 |
| FW | ENG | Johnny Berry | 42 | 2 | 6 | 0 | 48 | 2 |
| FW | SCO | Jimmy Dailey | 6 | 4 | 0 | 0 | 6 | 4 |
| FW | IRL | Jim Higgins | 28 | 7 | 6 | 2 | 23 | 9 |
| FW | IRL | Eddie O'Hara | 4 | 0 | 0 | 0 | 4 | 0 |
| FW | WAL | Aubrey Powell | 15 | 1 | 0 | 0 | 15 | 1 |
| FW | ENG | Harold Roberts | 10 | 0 | 0 | 0 | 10 | 0 |
| FW | ENG | Ken Rowley | 8 | 3 | 0 | 0 | 8 | 3 |
| FW | ENG | Bill Smith | 35 | 12 | 5 | 2 | 40 | 14 |
| FW | SCO | Jackie Stewart | 25 | 9 | 6 | 3 | 31 | 12 |
| FW | ENG | Cyril Trigg | 30 | 17 | 6 | 2 | 36 | 19 |
| FW | ENG | Roy Warhurst | 9 | 2 | 0 | 0 | 9 | 2 |

== See also ==
- Birmingham City F.C. seasons
