= 1954–55 Birmingham City F.C. season =

Birmingham City F.C.
1954–55 season
- Chairman: Harry Morris Jr
- Manager: Bob Brocklebank until October 1954; Arthur Turner thereafter
- Ground: St Andrew's
- Football League Second Division: 1st
- FA Cup: Sixth round (eliminated by Manchester City)
- Top goalscorer: League: Peter Murphy (20); All: Peter Murphy (20)
- Highest home attendance: 57,960 vs Manchester City, FA Cup 6th round, 20 April 1955
- Lowest home attendance: 6,441 vs Doncaster Rovers, 16 March 1955
- Average home league attendance: 20,973
Home colours

The 1954–55 Football League season was Birmingham City Football Club's 52nd in the Football League and their 24th in the Second Division. They finished top of the 22-team division on goal average, thus winning the Second Division title for the fourth time and gaining promotion to the First Division for 1955–56. They entered the 1954–55 FA Cup at the third round proper and lost to Manchester City in the sixth round (quarter-final).

Bob Brocklebank and chief scout Walter Taylor laid the foundations for the club's successes of the 1950s, introducing future England internationals Trevor Smith and Jeff Hall to the side, and bringing in the likes of Peter Murphy, Eddy Brown, Roy Warhurst and Alex Govan. Arthur Turner took over from Brocklebank as manager in November 1954 with the club mid-table in the Second Division, having gained only one point away from home. By the end of the season they had scored 92 goals, inflicted Liverpool's record defeat, by nine goals to one, which was also Birmingham's widest margin of victory in a league match since the 19th century, and, needing five points from the last three games, all away from home, to be sure of promotion, confirmed themselves as champions with a 5–1 win in the last game of the season away at Doncaster Rovers.

Twenty-five players made at least one appearance in nationally organised first-team competition, and there were eleven different goalscorers. Half-back Len Boyd played in 43 of the 46 first-team matches over the season, and Peter Murphy was leading goalscorer with 20 goals, all scored in league competition. All five first-choice forwards – Gordon Astall, Noel Kinsey, Brown, Murphy and Govan – reached double figures.

== Football League Second Division ==
Date	League position	Opponents	Venue	Result	Score F–A	Scorers	Attendance
21 August 1954	17th	Stoke City	A	L	1–2	Warhurst	27,820
25 August 1954	7th	Bristol Rovers	H	W	2–1	Kinsey, Rowley	25,890
28 August 1954	3rd	Rotherham United	H	W	3–1	Govan 2, Warhurst	27,260
30 August 1954	6th	Bristol Rovers	A	D	1–1	Warhurst	26,218
4 September 1954	11th	Luton Town	A	L	0–1		16,347
8 September 1954	8th	Ipswich Town	H	W	4–0	Kinsey, Warmington, Astall	21,238
11 September 1954	7th	Hull City	H	D	0–0		23,846
15 September 1954	6th	Ipswich Town	A	W	2–1	Warmington, Murphy	16,746
18 September 1954	6th	Lincoln City	A	D	1–1	Kinsey	14,581
25 September 1954	10th	Bury	H	L	1–3	Lane	21,242
2 October 1954	11th	Leeds United	A	L	0–1		21,200
9 October 1954	12th	Fulham	A	L	1–2	Astall	30,293
16 October 1954	12th	Swansea Town	H	W	2–0	Murphy 2	19,998
30 October 1954	14th	Derby County	H	D	1–1	Brown	20,568
6 November 1954	13th	West Ham United	A	D	2–2	Murphy 2	25,366
13 November 1954	11th	Blackburn Rovers	H	W	3–1	Brown, Astall, Govan	23,829
20 November 1954	12th	Plymouth Argyle	A	L	0–1		19,204
27 November 1954	10th	Port Vale	H	W	7–2	Brown, Murphy 3, Kinsey 2, Govan	16,352
4 December 1954	14th	Notts County	A	L	2–3	Murphy, Govan	13,477
11 December 1954	13th	Liverpool	H	W	9–1	Brown 3, Lane, Murphy 2, Astall 2, Govan	17,067
18 December 1954	11th	Stoke City	H	W	2–0	Brown, Govan	22,427
25 December 1954	12th	Nottingham Forest	H	L	0–1		33,007
27 December 1954	10th	Nottingham Forest	A	W	2–0	Murphy, Burkitt og	25,875
1 January 1955	8th	Rotherham United	A	W	2–0	Kinsey, Govan	17,166
5 February 1955	10th	Lincoln City	H	D	3–3	Murphy 2, Kinsey	20,313
12 February 1955	9th	Bury	A	W	1–0	Brown	12,547
2 March 1955	7th	Leeds United	H	W	2–0	Lane, Govan	10,774
5 March 1955	6th	Swansea Town	A	W	3–0	Lane, Kinsey, Boyd	22,565
16 March 1955	5th	Doncaster Rovers	H	W	4–1	Kinsey, Murphy, Astall, Warhurst	6,441
19 March 1955	7th	Derby County	A	D	0–0		19,489
26 March 1955	7th	West Ham United	H	L	1–2	Brown	9,132
30 March 1955	5th	Fulham	H	W	3–2	Lane, Astall 2	9,686
2 April 1955	6th	Blackburn Rovers	A	D	3–3	Lane, Murphy, Kinsey	27,673
8 April 1955	5th	Middlesbrough	A	W	5–2	Lane, Brown 2, Govan 2	32,519
9 April 1955	4th	Plymouth Argyle	H	W	3–1	Kinsey, Lane, Govan	25,078
11 April 1955	4th	Middlesbrough	H	W	3–0	Kinsey, Murphy, Govan	23,657
16 April 1955	5th	Port Vale	A	L	0–2		24,036
20 April 1955	3rd	Luton Town	H	W	2–1	Murphy 2	34,612
23 April 1955	5th	Notts County	H	D	1–1	Brown	28,018
25 April 1955	3rd	Hull City	A	W	3–0	Bradbury, Govan	12,848
30 April 1955	3rd	Liverpool	A	D	2–2	Brown, Astall	38,060
4 May 1955	1st	Doncaster Rovers	A	W	5–1	Brown, Murphy, Astall 2, Govan	21,305

=== League table (part) ===
Final Second Division table (part)
Pos	Club	Pld	W	D	L	F	A	GA	Pts
1st	Birmingham City	42	22	10	10	92	49	1.96	54
2nd	Luton Town	42	23	8	11	88	53	1.66	54
3rd	Rotherham United	42	25	4	13	94	64	1.47	54
4th	Leeds United	42	23	7	12	70	57	1.32	53
5th	Stoke City	42	21	10	11	69	46	1.50	52
Key	Pos = League position; Pld = Matches played; W = Matches won; D = Matches drawn; L = Matches lost; F = Goals for; A = Goals against; GA = Goal average; Pts = Points								
Source									

== FA Cup ==
Round	Date	Opponents	Venue	Result	Score F–A	Scorers	Attendance
Third round	8 January 1955	Hull City	A	W	2–0	Kinsey, Brown	25,920
Fourth round	29 January 1955	Bolton Wanderers	H	W	2–1	Govan, Wheeler og	56,852
Fifth round	19 February 1955	Doncaster Rovers	H	W	2–1	Brown 2	57,800
Sixth round	12 March 1955	Manchester City	H	L	0–1		57,960

== Appearances and goals ==
Players marked † left the club during the playing season.
Key to positions: GK – Goalkeeper; FB – Full back; HB – Half back; FW – Forward

Players' appearances and goals by competition
Pos.	Nat.	Name	League		FA Cup		Total	
Pos.	Nat.	Name	Apps	Goals	Apps	Goals	Apps	Goals
GK	ENG	Gil Merrick	27	0	4	0	31	0
GK	ENG	Johnny Schofield	15	0	0	0	15	0
FB	ENG	George Allen	13	0	0	0	13	0
FB	ENG	Jack Badham	11	0	0	0	11	0
FB	ENG	Ken Green	29	0	4	0	33	0
FB	ENG	Jeff Hall	32	0	4	0	36	0
FB	SCO	Roy Martin	1	0	0	0	1	0
HB	ENG	Len Boyd	39	1	4	0	43	1
HB	ENG	John James	0	0	1	0	1	0
HB	ENG	Johnny Newman	17	0	0	0	17	0
HB	ENG	Trevor Smith	24	0	4	0	28	0
HB	ENG	Roy Warhurst	34	4	3	0	37	4
HB	ENG	Johnny Watts	10	0	0	0	10	0
FW	ENG	Gordon Astall	33	11	4	0	37	11
FW	ENG	Bill Bradbury	2	2	0	0	2	2
FW	ENG	Eddy Brown	28	14	4	3	32	17
FW	ENG	Geoff Cox	4	0	0	0	4	0
FW	SCO	Alex Govan	37	15	4	1	41	16
FW	ENG	Dennis Hill	2	0	0	0	2	0
FW	WAL	Noel Kinsey	35	13	4	1	39	14
FW	ENG	Jackie Lane	22	8	0	0	22	8
FW	ENG	Peter Murphy	37	20	4	0	41	20
FW	ENG	Ken Rowley †	4	1	0	0	4	1
FW	SCO	Jackie Stewart †	1	0	0	0	1	0
FW	ENG	Peter Warmington	5	2	0	0	5	2

== See also ==
- Birmingham City F.C. seasons
