= 1951–52 Birmingham City F.C. season =

Birmingham City F.C.
1951–52 season
- Chairman: Harry Morris Jr
- Manager: Bob Brocklebank
- Ground: St Andrew's
- Football League Second Division: 3rd
- FA Cup: Fourth round (eliminated by Leyton Orient)
- Top goalscorer: League: Tommy Briggs (18); All: Tommy Briggs (19)
- Highest home attendance: 49,527 vs Leyton Orient, FA Cup 4th round, 2 February 1952
- Lowest home attendance: 13,894 vs Sheffield Wednesday, 12 September 1951
- Average home league attendance: 24,481
Home colours

The 1951–52 Football League season was Birmingham City Football Club's 49th in the Football League and their 21st in the Second Division. They finished in third position in the 22-team division, missing out on promotion to Cardiff City on goal average. They entered the 1951–52 FA Cup at the third round proper and lost to Leyton Orient in the fourth.

Twenty-three players made at least one appearance in nationally organised first-team competition, and there were fourteen different goalscorers. Goalkeeper Gil Merrick played in 43 of the 44 games over the season. Of outfield players, full-back Ken Green played in 41. Tommy Briggs was top scorer with 19 goals, of which 18 came in the league.

== Football League Second Division ==
Note that not all teams completed their playing season on the same day. Birmingham had been in the promotion positions since 22 March and were in second position after their last game of the season, on 26 April, but by the time the last game was played, on 3 May, Cardiff City had beaten Leeds United in their last game of the season to finish level on points with Birmingham with a better goal average.

Date	League position	Opponents	Venue	Result	Score F–A	Scorers	Attendance
18 August 1951	6th	Bury	H	W	2–1	Trigg, Higgins	23,861
22 August 1951	4th	Leeds United	H	D	1–1	Ferris	17,801
25 August 1951	15th	Leicester City	A	L	0–4		24,465
29 August 1951	12th	Leeds United	A	D	1–1	Purdon	15,098
1 September 1951	18th	Nottingham Forest	H	L	0–2		23,192
3 September 1951	16th	Sheffield Wednesday	A	D	1–1	Higgins	32,506
8 September 1951	19th	Brentford	A	L	0–1		25,029
12 September 1951	19th	Sheffield Wednesday	H	D	0–0		13,894
15 September 1951	20th	Doncaster Rovers	H	D	2–2	Badham, Dorman	16,220
22 September 1951	15th	Everton	A	W	3–1	Tommy Briggs, Purdon, Wardle	37,138
29 September 1951	15th	Southampton	H	D	1–1	Briggs	25,786
6 October 1951	13th	Swansea Town	H	D	1–1	Higgins	28,060
13 October 1951	13th	Coventry City	A	D	1–1	Rowley	23,580
20 October 1951	10th	West Ham United	H	W	2–1	Stewart, Briggs	20,295
27 October 1951	16th	Sheffield United	A	L	2–4	Rowley, Stewart	31,190
3 November 1951	13th	Barnsley	H	W	2–1	Briggs, Stewart	19,186
10 November 1951	10th	Hull City	A	W	1–0	Briggs	27,482
17 November 1951	11th	Blackburn Rovers	H	L	0–1		22,337
24 November 1951	10th	Queens Park Rangers	A	W	2–0	Briggs, Smith	14,945
1 December 1951	9th	Notts County	H	W	2–0	Smith 2	26,554
8 December 1951	7th	Luton Town	A	W	4–2	Purdon, Smith, Stewart, Warhurst	15,937
15 December 1951	9th	Bury	A	L	0–3		12,347
22 December 1951	8th	Leicester City	H	W	2–0	Briggs, Wardle	22,230
25 December 1951	5th	Rotherham United	H	W	4–0	Smith 3, Purdon	27,531
26 December 1951	3rd	Rotherham United	A	W	2–1	Briggs, Badham	22,371
29 December 1951	2nd	Nottingham Forest	A	W	1–0	Briggs	34,316
5 January 1952	3rd	Brentford	H	L	1–2	Wardle	28,368
19 January 1952	1st	Doncaster Rovers	A	W	5–0	Murphy 3, Briggs, Stewart	20,282
26 January 1952	2nd	Everton	H	L	1–2	Stewart	32,980
9 February 1952	4th	Southampton	A	L	0–2		18,688
16 February 1952	5th	Swansea Town	A	L	0–4		24,230
1 March 1952	5th	Coventry City	H	W	3–1	Briggs, Stewart, Murphy	33,007
8 March 1952	3rd	West Ham United	A	W	1–0	Briggs	24,011
15 March 1952	4th	Sheffield United	H	W	3–0	Trigg, Murphy 2	28,092
22 March 1952	1st	Barnsley	A	W	2–1	Murphy, Stewart	14,377
29 March 1952	1st	Hull City	H	D	2–2	Smith, Briggs	14,660
5 April 1952	2nd	Blackburn Rovers	A	W	4–1	Smith, Briggs 2, Dailey	19,151
11 April 1952	2nd	Cardiff City	H	W	3–2	Briggs, Green, Sherwood og	32,941
12 April 1952	1st	Queens Park Rangers	H	W	1–0	Trigg	28,286
14 April 1952	2nd	Cardiff City	A	L	1–3	Briggs	25,470
19 April 1952	2nd	Notts County	A	L	0–5		24,360
26 April 1952	2nd	Luton Town	H	W	3–1	Briggs, Purdon, Stewart	28,816

=== League table (part) ===
Final Second Division table (part)
Pos	Club	Pld	W	D	L	F	A	GA	Pts
1st	Sheffield Wednesday	42	21	11	10	100	66	1.51	53
2nd	Cardiff City	42	20	11	11	72	54	1.33	51
3rd	Birmingham City	42	21	9	12	67	56	1.20	51
4th	Nottingham Forest	42	18	13	11	77	62	1.24	49
5th	Leicester City	42	19	9	14	78	64	1.22	47
Key	Pos = League position; Pld = Matches played; W = Matches won; D = Matches drawn; L = Matches lost; F = Goals for; A = Goals against; GA = Goal average; Pts = Points								
Source									

== FA Cup ==
Round	Date	Opponents	Venue	Result	Score F–A	Scorers	Attendance (Note: Matthews (2010) gives the attendances for the two FA Cup matches the other way round. However, contemporary newspapers confirm attendances of approximately 26,000 for the Fulham match and "nearly 50,000" for Leyton Orient.)
Third round	12 January 1952	Fulham	A	W	1–0	Tommy Briggs	25,806
Fourth round	2 February 1952	Leyton Orient	H	L	0–1		49,527

== Appearances and goals ==
Players marked † left the club during the playing season.
Key to positions: GK – Goalkeeper; FB – Full back; HB – Half back; FW – Forward

Players' appearances and goals by competition
Pos.	Nat.	Name	League		FA Cup		Total	
Pos.	Nat.	Name	Apps	Goals	Apps	Goals	Apps	Goals
GK	ENG	Gil Merrick	41	0	2	0	43	0
GK	ENG	Bill Robertson	1	0	0	0	1	0
FB	ENG	Jack Badham	39	2	2	0	41	2
FB	ENG	Ken Green	33	1	2	0	35	1
FB	ENG	Jeff Hall	6	0	0	0	6	0
FB	SCO	Roy Martin	19	0	2	0	21	0
HB	ENG	Arthur Atkins	31	0	2	0	33	0
HB	ENG	Len Boyd	37	0	0	0	37	0
HB	NIR	Ray Ferris	14	1	0	0	14	1
HB	ENG	Johnny Newman	1	0	0	0	1	0
HB	ENG	Roy Warhurst	36	1	2	0	38	1
HB	ENG	Johnny Watts	1	0	0	0	1	0
FW	ENG	Johnny Berry †	4	0	0	0	4	0
FW	ENG	Tommy Briggs	33	18	2	1	35	19
FW	SCO	Jimmy Dailey	5	1	0	0	5	1
FW	ENG	Don Dorman †	2	1	0	0	2	1
FW	IRL	Jim Higgins	10	3	0	0	10	3
FW	ENG	Peter Murphy	15	7	1	0	16	7
FW	ZAF	Ted Purdon	19	5	0	0	19	5
FW	ENG	Ken Rowley	12	2	0	0	12	2
FW	ENG	Bill Smith	19	9	2	0	21	9
FW	SCO	Jackie Stewart	37	9	2	0	39	9
FW	ENG	Cyril Trigg	12	3	1	0	13	3
FW	ENG	Billy Wardle	35	3	2	0	37	3

== See also ==
- Birmingham City F.C. seasons
