= History of Birmingham City F.C. (1875–1965) =

History of an English football club

Small Heath F.C. pictured in 1893 with the Football League Second Division trophy

Birmingham City Football Club, an English association football club based in Birmingham, was founded as Small Heath Alliance in September 1875, and from 1877 played home games at Muntz Street. It adopted professionalism in 1885, and three years later, as Small Heath F.C., became a limited company with a board of directors, the first football club so to do. The team played in the Football Alliance from the 1889–90 season, and in 1892, along with the other Alliance teams, were invited to join the newly formed Second Division of the Football League. Although they finished as champions, they failed to win promotion via the test match system; the following season promotion to the First Division was secured after a second-place finish and test match victory over Darwen. The club adopted the name Birmingham Football Club in 1905, and the following year moved into a new home, St Andrew's Ground. Matters on the field failed to live up to their surroundings. Birmingham were relegated in 1908, obliged to apply for re-election two years later, and remained in the Second Division until after the First World War.

Under the captaincy of Frank Womack, who went on to set club appearance records, Birmingham won their second Division Two title in 1920–21. The 19-year-old Joe Bradford made his debut in 1920; he was to score a club record 267 goals in 445 games and win 12 caps for England. In 1931, manager Leslie Knighton led the club to their first FA Cup Final; they lost 2–1 to Second Division club West Bromwich Albion. Though Birmingham remained in the top flight for 18 seasons, they struggled in the league, placing too much reliance on England goalkeeper Harry Hibbs to make up for the lack of goals, Bradford excepted, at the other end. They were finally relegated in 1938–39, the last full season before the Football League was suspended for the duration of the Second World War.

The name Birmingham City F.C. was adopted in 1943. Under Harry Storer, appointed manager in 1945, the team won the Football League South wartime league and reached the semi-final of the first post-war FA Cup. Two years later they won their third Second Division title, conceding only 24 goals in the 42-game season. Storer's successor, Bob Brocklebank, though unable to stave off relegation in 1950, brought in players who made a major contribution to the club's successes of the next decade. After taking over halfway through the 1954–55 season, Arthur Turner led the team to another Second Division title followed by what remains their highest league finish, of sixth place in the First Division, in 1955–56. They also reached the FA Cup final, losing 3–1 to Manchester City in the game best remembered for City's goalkeeper Bert Trautmann playing the last 20 minutes with a broken bone in his neck. The following season the club lost in the FA Cup semi-final for the third time since the war, this time beaten 2–0 by Manchester United's "Busby Babes".

Birmingham became the first English club side to take part in European competition when they played their first fixture in the inaugural Inter-Cities Fairs Cup competition in May 1956; they lost to Barcelona after a replay in the semi-final. They were also the first to reach a European final, losing to Barcelona in the 1960 Fairs Cup final, and also lost to Roma in 1961. As a player, Gil Merrick had beaten Womack's appearance record and been England's regular goalkeeper; as manager, his team saved their best form for cup competitions. Opponents in the 1963 League Cup final, local rivals Aston Villa, were pre-match favourites, but Birmingham raised their game and won 3–1 on aggregate to lift their first major trophy. By 1965, Merrick had been asked to resign, and after ten years in the top flight, Birmingham were back in the Second Division.

== 1875–92: The early years ==
In 1875, when members of the cricket team based at Holy Trinity Church, Bordesley, on the east side of Birmingham, decided they wanted something to do in the winter months, they formed a football team. Playing under the name of Small Heath Alliance, their early games took place on a piece of waste ground off Arthur Street. As interest grew, they moved to an enclosed field in the Sparkbrook area where admission could be charged. In 1877, they decamped again, this time paying £5 a year to the family of a team member to rent a field adjacent to Muntz Street, in the Small Heath district, which became their home for the next 29 years.

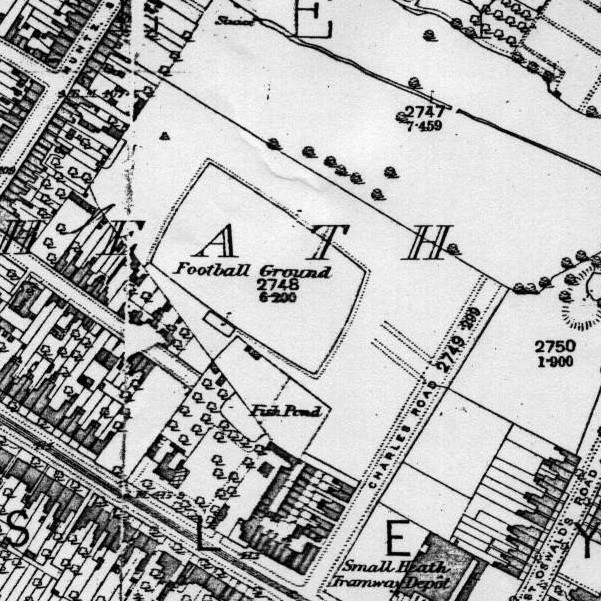
Muntz Street and surroundings in 1890

For the first thirteen years of their existence, there was no league football, so friendly matches were arranged on an ad hoc basis, supplemented by cup competitions organised at local and national level. During the 1880s, they played between 20 and 30 matches each season. They played Aston Villa, the team that would become their main local rivals, for the first time in 1879; Small Heath won by "a goal and a disputed goal to nil". They first entered the Birmingham Senior Cup in 1878–79, made their debut in the national cup competition, the FA Cup, in 1881–82 – Billy Slater scored their first goal in nationally organised football as Small Heath beat Derby Town 4–1 – and won their first trophy, the Walsall Cup, the following season. In 1885–86, Small Heath reached the semi-final of the FA Cup, in which they faced West Bromwich Albion in front of 10,000 spectators at Aston Lower Grounds. According to the Sheffield & Rotherham Independent, Small Heath, who were by no means one of the foremost teams in the Birmingham area, had had a fortunate draw in the competition, whereas their opponents, fellow members of the Birmingham Football Association, were among the strongest in the country. Albion won easily, by four goals to nil, and the game was ended early after the losing supporters invaded the pitch and pelted the Albion goalkeeper with snowballs.

As soon as payment of players over and above their actual out-of-pocket expenses was permitted by the Football Association for the first time, in 1885, the Small Heath club turned professional. The players did not receive a salary, but instead shared half the gate money. Three years later, at the suggestion of Walter Hart, the president of the Birmingham FA who had once been the club's honorary secretary, it became the first football club to structure itself as a limited company with a board of directors, under the name of The Small Heath Football Club Limited. The original company listed its objects as "to acquire a Football Club to play the game of Association Football and the doing all such other things as are incidental or conducive to the attainment of the above", set its nominal capital at £500, to be divided into ten-shilling shares, and its memorandum of association listed seven initial subscribers who between them took up 35 of the 1000 shares. These included Hart, who became the first chairman of its board, Alfred Jones, honorary secretary, and William Starling.

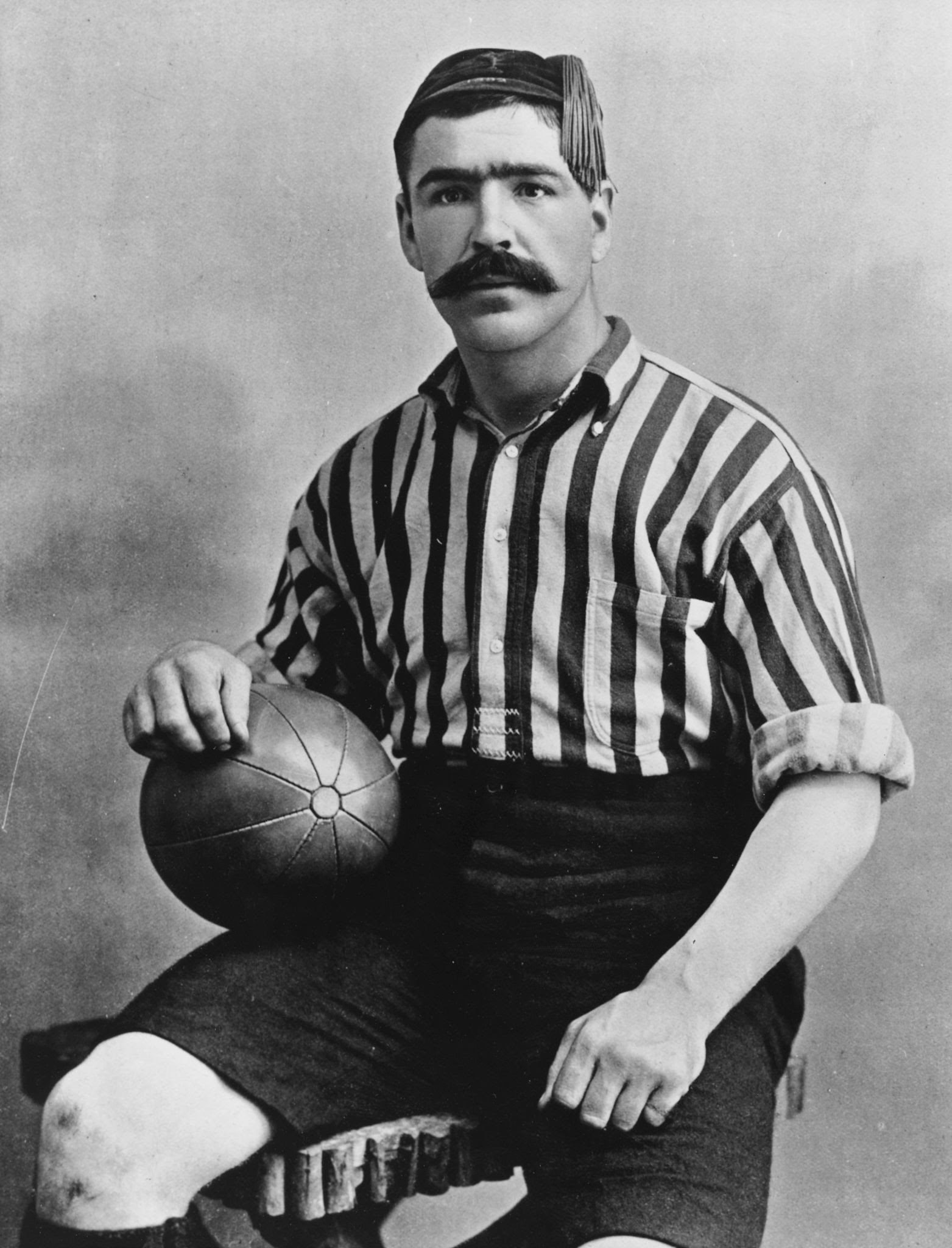
Caesar Jenkyns, captain in the 1890s

Small Heath were not among the select twelve clubs invited to join the Football League, which was to begin in 1888. Instead, they joined the Football Combination, a second league formed to provide organised football for such excluded clubs. This was not a success; poor organisation caused it to fold in April 1889 with many fixtures still outstanding. For 1889–90, Small Heath were accepted into the Football Alliance, a new second league whose committee adopted the more successful aspects of the Football League's organisation, including limiting team numbers to a manageable twelve, and arranging and publishing the fixture list before the season began. After two tenth-place finishes, and elimination from the 1890–91 FA Cup for fielding an ineligible player, they finished third in 1891–92, helped by Fred Wheldon's 21 goals from the 22 matches and Caesar Jenkyns' captaincy and physical centre-half play. Jenkyns became the first man to play a senior international match while a Small Heath player when selected for Wales for the 1892–93 Home Internationals. They also progressed through four qualifying rounds and one round proper to reach the last 16 of the FA Cup. Drawn first, and therefore having choice of venue, Small Heath accepted Sheffield Wednesday's offer of £200 to forfeit home advantage and play the match at Wednesday's Olive Grove ground; they lost.

== 1892–1905: Small Heath in the Football League ==
The Football League decided to expand its membership for the 1892–93 season by forming a Second Division. Although Small Heath's application for admission to the enlarged First Division failed, they were one of eight Football Alliance teams accepted into the Second. The directors appointed Alfred Jones as the club's first paid secretary, and William Starling was elected to the Football League Management Committee as one of two representatives of the Second Division. During the season, the team scored 90 goals at an average of 4 goals per game, beat Walsall Town Swifts 12–0 to set a club record League victory which, as of 2015, still stands, remained undefeated on their own ground, and won the last nine matches of the season to take the inaugural Second Division title. Goalkeeper Chris Charsley, a policeman who played as an amateur and went on to serve as chief constable of Coventry, became the first Small Heath player to be capped by England. Promotion to the First Division was not automatic, even for the champions, but depended on the results of test matches between the top three Second Division and bottom three First Division teams. Small Heath lost to 16th-placed First Division team Newton Heath (the future Manchester United) after a replay, so were not promoted, although the teams placed second and third were. Their success at the second attempt, as 1893–94 runners-up and victors over Darwen in the test match, was met with relief as well as celebration. The club had been in serious financial difficulty during the season, during which it added a loss of £222 to an existing deficit of some £350; the Birmingham Daily Post believed that "defeat would in all probability have meant the disbanding of the club", ambitions of promotion having sustained the committee's efforts throughout the season to raise enough funds to keep going.

The Muntz Street end of the Coventry Road ground

Ahead of their first season in the top division, and in anticipation of increased attendances, the club began work on a grandstand and relaid the pitch. Over the next few years, they purchased the remaining eleven years of the lease on the Coventry Road ground, and bought the grandstand from Aston Villa's Wellington Road ground to use as a terrace cover, providing more covered standing accommodation. Despite the misgivings of the Daily Post that the squad was too small, the team finished 12th of 16. They opened the 1895–96 campaign with six defeats, spent most of it in the bottom two places, conceded more goals than any other team in the division for the second consecutive season, and scored fewer than all but bottom club West Bromwich Albion. The directors were criticised for failing to improve the team and for their selection policy: making too many changes to the team from one game to the next, and playing men when they were unfit. A draw from the final match of the season, at home to Sunderland, would have secured their First Division status for another year, but they lost, finished 15th of the 16 teams, and were relegated. Following the relegation, Fred Wheldon, who had scored 116 goals from 175 matches in league and FA Cup, left for League champions Aston Villa for a fee of £350, which was reported to be a national record.

Small Heath were involved in two incidents during First Division matches that had lasting ramifications. After one of Everton's goals in a 4–4 draw in November 1894 was awarded despite having gone well wide, the referee believing it had passed through a hole in the net – William McGregor, former president of the League, suggested that it was the worst decision he had seen since goal-nets were introduced, and the scorer agreed that it was no goal – the League issued an instruction to referees to examine the nets before each match in the future. A year later, after their visit to Everton was abandoned after 37 minutes because of bad weather and the state of the pitch, a spectator took the host club to court claiming the return of his admission money. The case was decided in favour of the club, the judge ruling that the paying spectator is not entitled to a full 90 minutes' football, but only to that portion which can reasonably be completed within the rules of the game.

Walter Abbott, record-holder for goals in a season

Five seasons in the Second Division followed. Small Heath started 1896–97 badly but finished frustratingly well, in fourth position. After coming sixth in 1898, they were only two points off the promotion positions with four matches of the 1898–99 season to play; they lost three, drew one, and finished eighth. Walter Abbott set club records that still stand, of 34 league goals in a season and 42 in all competitions. In 1899–1900, Small Heath were never out of the top four in the division but rarely in the top two, and finished third. Both income and expenditure had doubled over the two First Division seasons. The local press criticised the "penny wise and pound foolish" approach to the signing of players after relegation, and the 1898–99 accounts illustrated an over-reliance on gate receipts: Woolwich Arsenal took £360 less on the gate, but their profit exceeded Small Heath's by nearly £3,000. After an £875 loss the following season, the directors made it clear they could not continue funding a loss-making enterprise, and suggested that a reduction in players' wages was the only course of action.

Two defeats at the end of the 1900–01 season deprived Small Heath of a second divisional title, but not of promotion as runners-up. They also reached the quarter-final of the FA Cup, losing to Aston Villa after a replay. The board's decision to reject Villa's offer of "a big transfer fee and a benefit match in addition" for the services of centre-forward Bob McRoberts was vindicated when he top-scored with 17 goals. Average attendances rose from 5,500 to 13,000 for 1901–02, but finishing the season with a six-match unbeaten run was not enough to escape relegation. A fifth change of division in eleven seasons – they reached the top two places by mid-November 1902 and remained there for the rest of the campaign – gained Small Heath the reputation of a yo-yo club. This time, a late run proved enough to keep them in the division, in contrast to 1904–05 when they reached second place in mid-February, one point behind Everton, but lost six of the last ten games to finish seventh.

== 1905–15: New name and new home ==
With William Adams as president and former player Harry Morris on the board, the club adopted a more enterprising approach. An extraordinary general meeting in March 1905 heard a proposal that, Small Heath being the only major football club in the city (Note: Aston Villa F.C. was based in the municipal borough of Aston Manor, which was not absorbed into the county borough of Birmingham until 1911.) since Birmingham St George's had folded in 1892, the club should be renamed Birmingham City F.C. The shareholders were not in favour, though they were prepared to go as far as plain Birmingham Football Club. That name was approved by the Football Association, after consulting the Birmingham F.A., and by the League, and was formally adopted ahead of the 1905–06 season. It was still a step too far for some; one reporter referred to "the Small Heath club now masquerading as Birmingham", and the Manchester Courier reported their assuming "the more pretentious name of Birmingham".

The inadequacies of the Coventry Road ground, which was by then surrounded by tightly packed housing, were highlighted by events surrounding the February 1905 match with Aston Villa. The official attendance was given as 28,000, though with the gates closed before kick-off, thousands scaled walls or forced entrances in order to gain admission, and the actual attendance was estimated at anything up to 35,000. The Birmingham Daily Mail commented that had space been available, another ten or fifteen thousand spectators might well have attended, as "hundreds of people found the doors closed against them, and probably there were thousands who would not go to the ground in view of the inevitable crush." The landlords had raised the rent, but would neither sell the freehold of the ground nor allow its expansion, and the directors estimated that remaining at Coventry Road was losing the club as much as £2,000 a year in revenue. Morris identified the site of a disused brickworks, three-quarters of a mile (1 km) nearer the city centre, as suitable for a new ground, the directors signed a 21-year lease, and construction began in January 1906. On 26 December of that year, after volunteers spent all morning clearing the snow, 32,000 spectators witnessed the official opening of the 75,000-capacity St Andrew's Ground and a goalless draw with Middlesbrough.

The Football Association used the ground for a semi-final of that season's FA Cup, but Birmingham's play failed to live up to the new surroundings. They were relegated in 1907–08, prompting the resignation of Alf Jones, who had been secretary-manager since 1892. The second of Alex Watson's three seasons in charge ended with Birmingham bottom of the Second Division and having to apply for re-election to the league. (Note: Until 1987, clubs finishing each season in the bottom positions of the Football League were obliged to apply for re-election to the league, in competition with applicants from non-League football. Full member clubs of the Football League (the top two divisions) were eligible to vote, together with delegates representing the associate member clubs (lower divisions).) After Hart's address, in which he stressed the club's age and longstanding league membership and assured his audience that inexperienced directors to whom the team's present position could be attributed had retired in favour of men of experience, the meeting voted Birmingham back into the league as top of the poll. Responsibility for team affairs passed to former player Bob McRoberts, who in 1911 became the club's first dedicated team manager. Birmingham remained in the second tier for the five seasons before League football was suspended because of the First World War.

== 1915–39: Birmingham in the First Division ==
Frank Richards had taken over as secretary in 1911, and also acted as Birmingham's team manager for the various wartime competitions. When the Football League resumed after the war, he retained the post, and it was under his management that they returned to the First Division, in which they would remain for eighteen seasons. Birmingham placed third in 1919–20, and in 1920–21, driven by Frank Womack's captaincy and the creative skills of Scottish international Johnny Crosbie, they reached the last day of the 1920–21 season needing to beat Port Vale away to be sure of maintaining their position ahead of Cardiff City and thus clinch the division title for the second time. They did so. A 19-year-old called Joe Bradford scored on his competitive debut on Christmas Day 1920 at West Ham United; he went on to set goalscoring records for the club of 267 goals, 249 in the league, was their leading scorer for twelve consecutive seasons from 1922 to 1933, and scored seven times in twelve appearances for England. Off the field, the club bought the freehold of St Andrew's in 1921 for around £7,000.

Birmingham finished 18th out of 22 in the first season back at the top level, but did not take part in the 1921–22 FA Cup. The club failed to submit the entry form in time to be granted exemption from qualifying, and the Football Association refused to bend the rules in their favour. Although that decision did not preclude their entering the competition in the qualifying rounds, the directors chose not to do so. In 1922–23, the team set an unwanted record sequence of eight league defeats, since equalled but as of 2015 not beaten. Off the field, the club made a £13,000 saving on wages and general expenses to end the season with a profit of £3,000.

This had been Richards' last season as secretary-manager. He was succeeded by Billy Beer, who had played 250 matches for the club in the 1900s. He led the team to three mid-table finishes before, in early 1927, a boardroom dispute over transfer policy came to a head. Writing in the Sports Argus, the pseudonymous "Argus Junior" described one faction as "anxious to secure talent at almost any price" and the other "desirous with 'going slow' as its motto", and believed that "the former are now in the ascendancy and that they mean business". Three directors resigned, followed a few days later by Beer, who had reportedly found it impossible to work with some members of the board. Over the next few months, further departures included secretary Sam Richards, former player Billy Harvey, who had acted as team manager, and the long-serving Womack, who made his Birmingham debut in 1908 and set club appearance records of 491 league games, a record which as of 2015 still stands, and 515 games in senior competition, since overtaken by Gil Merrick. The Argus suggested a better course of action and "the clear duty of the present board [would be] to resign and test the feelings of the shareholders".

Instead, it appointed former Arsenal manager Leslie Knighton as secretary-manager in June 1928. He was able to stabilise the team and in 1930–31, led them to their first FA Cup Final. Between semi-final and final Birmingham lost six of their nine league matches, and The Times reminded its readers that "sickness and injury had played havoc with their men for weeks past. They had no regular practice together for the great match." Opponents West Bromwich Albion were heading for promotion from the Second Division, youthful and full of confidence. Bradford had played only once since the semi-final and declared himself fit on the morning of the match. Birmingham had a goal disallowed early on, then fell behind; the clearly unfit Bradford was able to equalise, but W. G. Richardson went upfield straight from the kickoff and scored his side's winner. Knighton's team finished in the top half of the division in 1932, and he signed a contract extension, but when Chelsea made him an offer he could not refuse, he left, to be replaced by George Liddell, recently retired from playing.

Birmingham remained in the top flight for 18 seasons in all, but most of them were spent in the bottom half of the table. Consistency of selection played a part in the 1920s; six – Womack, Bradford, Crosbie, Dan Tremelling, Percy Barton and Liddell – of the as of 2010 fifteen men with more than 300 league appearances for the club played most of their matches in that decade. Much reliance was placed on Tremelling and then on England goalkeeper Harry Hibbs to make up for the lack of goals, Bradford excepted, at the other end. Under Liddell's management, the makeup of the side never settled. He used 70 players over his six seasons in charge (in contrast to the 55 used in the first six First Division seasons in the 1920s), and after narrowly avoiding relegation three times in 1934, 1935 and 1938, Birmingham were finally relegated in 1938–39, the last full season before the Second World War. The club's record attendance of 67,341 was set that season, in the fifth round of the FA Cup against Everton.

== 1939–65: Birmingham City and post-war success ==
When war was declared in September 1939, the government banned public gatherings until safety implications could be assessed. Most football grounds reopened soon afterwards, even those in built-up or strategically significant areas, but Birmingham's Chief Constable ordered the continued closure of St Andrew's because of its proximity to likely air-raid targets such as the BSA munitions factories. The matter was raised in Parliament, but the Home Secretary felt unable to intervene in what was perceived as a local issue, and the Chief Constable did not bow to public pressure until March 1940. The ground suffered 20 direct hits from Luftwaffe bombing, bringing down the roof of the Kop terrace, and fires damaged the railway end stand, scoreboard and clock, and destroyed the main stand, including board room, gymnasium, treatment room and offices. The club's current name of Birmingham City F.C. was adopted in 1943. When nationally organised football resumed in 1945, Harry Storer was appointed manager. In his first season the club won the Football League South title, ahead of Aston Villa on goal average – the 1945–46 Football League North and South included teams from the pre-war First and Second Divisions, and were an interim step between the highly regionalised and mixed-ability wartime leagues and the Football League itself, which restarted in 1946–47 – and reached the semi-final of the first post-war FA Cup. Two years later they won their third Second Division title, conceding only 24 goals in the 42-game season.

Bob Brocklebank succeeded Storer as manager in 1950. Though unable to prevent them being relegated, he and chief scout Walter Taylor laid the foundations for the club's successes of the 1950s. Brocklebank was responsible for introducing future England internationals Trevor Smith and Jeff Hall to the side, and for bringing in several mainstays of Birmingham's teams through the 1950s. Arthur Turner took over as manager in November 1954 with the club mid-table in the Second Division. By the end of the season they had scored 92 goals, with all five first-choice forwards reaching double figures, beaten Liverpool 9–1, a result which remains that club's record defeat, and were confirmed champions with a 5–1 win in the last game of the season away to Doncaster Rovers.

Birmingham's sixth position in their first season back in the First Division remains their highest league finish. They also reached their second FA Cup Final, but lost 3–1 to Manchester City in a game best remembered for City's goalkeeper, Bert Trautmann, playing the last 20 minutes with a broken bone in his neck. City won using the Revie Plan, in which their centre-forward Don Revie played in a deep position, disrupting the Birmingham defence accustomed to the era's conventional playing positions. Goalkeeper Gil Merrick attributed to the defeat to a half-time failure to discuss how to stop Revie, and outside left Alex Govan blamed the absence of the "utterly ruthless" Roy Warhurst through injury and a poor choice of replacement. It was during this FA Cup campaign, in which all Birmingham's games had been away from home, that Harry Lauder's "Keep right on to the end of the road" was adopted as the fans' anthem. The following season the club lost in the FA Cup semi-final for the third time since the war, beaten 2–0 by Manchester United's "Busby Babes".

For the inaugural edition of the Inter-Cities Fairs Cup, a football tournament set up in 1955 to promote international trade fairs, invitations were extended to host cities rather than to clubs. Aston Villa rejected the opportunity to supply players for a combined team to represent the city of Birmingham, so Birmingham City became the first English club side to play in European competition when they played their first match on 15 May 1956. They were also the first English club side to reach a European final, the 1960 Fairs Cup Final, in which they lost to Barcelona 4–1 on aggregate. (Note: The London XI, including players from several London clubs, were the first English team to play in European competition when they played their first match in the inaugural Fairs Cup in 1955, and the first English team to reach a final, in the same campaign.) They reached and lost in the 1961 final as well, to Roma 4–2 on aggregate.

In February 1958, three days after Birmingham lost 8–0 at Preston North End, former Bristol City manager Pat Beasley joined the club. He was expected to be Turner's assistant, but chairman Harry Morris Jr. announced his appointment as joint manager, that Turner had recommended him, and that secretary Walter Adams was also to have input into team matters. At the time, Turner was quoted as being happy with the arrangement, but was later reported to have only found out about it from the press and to have needed persuading not to resign. The experiment did not work. Turner and the board found themselves at odds over aspects of managerial policy, the players unsure as to who was in charge. With the team lying 21st after a 6–0 defeat against West Bromwich Albion, Turner quit in September 1958. Beasley was named acting manager, and would have to submit his team selections to the board for discussion, though not for alteration: Morris insisted that "The manager and not the directors will pick the team as long as I am chairman." He led the team to a 9th-place finish.

Towards the end of the season, two weeks after playing in a match at Portsmouth, Birmingham full-back Jeff Hall died of polio. The realisation that a young, fit, England footballer could die of a preventable disease sparked a massive rise in demand for vaccination, and a memorial fund launched in his name by the club and local newspapers endowed a research fellowship in the University of Birmingham's Department of Medicine.

Gil Merrick joined the club in 1939 and kept goal during and after the war through the 1940s and much of the 1950s. He won 23 caps for England, and set a club record of 551 appearances in all senior competitions, as well as coaching the reserves. After Birmingham finished 19th in 1959–60, having been in or just above the relegation places throughout the season, Merrick was appointed first-team manager. He was unable to improve the team's league performance, but did lead them to the first major trophy in the club's history. Entry to the new League Cup competition, introduced in 1960–61, was optional; several top-flight clubs chose not to enter, but Birmingham did so from the first year. In 1962–63, while avoiding relegation only by winning two of their last three matches, they showed their best form in reaching the League Cup final, which was played over two legs on the grounds of the competing clubs. Opponents Aston Villa were pre-match favourites, having beaten Birmingham 4–0 in their most recent league meeting. But in the home leg Birmingham "served up a treat of attacking football ... controlling the game with such assurance that their supporters must have wondered why the team had performed so badly in the First Division", and came out comfortable 3–1 winners, with two goals from Ken Leek and one from Jimmy Bloomfield. Under the captaincy of Trevor Smith, a solid defensive performance in a goalless draw saw Birmingham lift the trophy at the home of their local rivals. After the fourth consecutive bottom-six finish – they won the last two matches of 1963–64 to escape relegation – the board felt a "complete reorganisation" of the club was necessary, and asked Merrick to resign. He complied, but thought he had been ill-treated, and had nothing more to do with the club for more than thirty years. In 1964–65, Birmingham finished seven points away from safety and returned to the Second Division.

== Bibliography ==
- Inglis, Simon (1988). League Football and the men who made it. London: CollinsWillow. ISBN 978-0-00-218242-3.
- Lewis, Peter, ed. (2000). Keeping right on since 1875. The Official History of Birmingham City Football Club. Lytham: Arrow. ISBN 1-900722-12-7.
- Matthews, Tony (1995). Birmingham City: A Complete Record. Derby: Breedon Books. ISBN 978-1-85983-010-9.
- Matthews, Tony (2010). Birmingham City: The Complete Record. Derby: Derby Books. ISBN 978-1-85983-853-2.
- Matthews, Tony (2000). The Encyclopedia of Birmingham City Football Club 1875–2000. Cradley Heath: Britespot. ISBN 978-0-9539288-0-4.
