= 1955–56 Birmingham City F.C. season =

Birmingham City F.C.
1955–56 season
- Chairman: Harry Morris Jr
- Manager: Arthur Turner
- Ground: St Andrew's
- Football League First Division: 6th
- FA Cup: Runners-up (eliminated by Manchester City)
- Inter-Cities Fairs Cup: Group stage
- Top goalscorer: League: Eddy Brown (21); All: Eddy Brown (29)
- Highest home attendance: 48,000 vs Preston North End, 3 September 1955
- Lowest home attendance: 23,800 vs Sheffield United, 24 December 1955
- Average home league attendance: 32,207
Home colours

The 1955–56 Football League season was Birmingham City Football Club's 53rd in the Football League and their 29th in the First Division, having been promoted as Second Division champions in 1954–55. They finished in a club-record sixth position in the 22-team division. They entered the 1955–56 FA Cup in the third round proper and reached the Final for only the second time, despite being drawn to play away from home in each round, the first time this had occurred. They lost 3–1 to Manchester City in a match remembered for City's goalkeeper Bert Trautmann playing the last 25 minutes with a broken neck.

Birmingham City became the first English club side to take part in European competition when they played their first group game in the 1955–58 Inter-Cities Fairs Cup on 16 May 1956, a goalless draw away at Inter Milan. The competition lasted over three English seasons with the final not played until 1958. Invitations to enter the Fairs Cup, a tournament set up to promote industrial trade fairs, were extended to the city hosting the trade fair rather than to clubs. Some cities entered a select team including players from more than one club, but Aston Villa, the other major club based in the city of Birmingham, rejected the opportunity to field a combined team.

Twenty-four players made at least one appearance in nationally or internationally organised first-team competition, and there were thirteen different goalscorers. Goalkeeper Gil Merrick and forwards Eddy Brown and Peter Murphy played in 46 of the 50 first-team matches over the season, and Brown finished as leading goalscorer with 29 goals in all competitions, of which 21 were scored in the league.

== Football League First Division ==
Note that not all teams completed their playing season on the same day. Birmingham were in fourth position after their last game of the season, on 21 April, but by the time the last game was played, on 2 May, they were sixth, having been overtaken by Manchester City and Arsenal.

Date	League position	Opponents	Venue	Result	Score F–A	Scorers	Attendance
20 August 1955	8th	Manchester United	H	D	2–2	Kinsey, Astall	37,612
24 August 1955	7th	Newcastle United	A	D	2–2	Murphy, Astall	34,473
27 August 1955	4th	Sheffield United	A	W	3–0	Brown, Kinsey, Murphy	23,299
31 August 1955	2nd	Newcastle United	H	W	3–1	Brown, Murphy, Warhurst	38,369
3 September 1955	8th	Preston North End	H	L	0–3		47,014
5 September 1955	5th	Aston Villa	A	D	0–0		56,935
10 September 1955	10th	Burnley	A	L	2–3	Kinsey, Astall	22,808
17 September 1955	12th	Luton Town	H	D	0–0		31,013
21 September 1955	10th	Aston Villa	H	D	2–2	Brown, Astall	32,642
24 September 1955	13th	Charlton Athletic	A	L	0–2		21,912
1 October 1955	10th	Tottenham Hotspur	H	W	3–0	Brown, Murphy, Clarke og	31,320
8 October 1955	12th	Sunderland	H	L	1–2	Hudgell og	37,946
15 October 1955	10th	Portsmouth	A	W	5–0	Brown 3, Kinsey, Govan	28,952
22 October 1955	7th	Manchester City	H	W	4–3	Lane, Murphy, Govan, Boyd	28,398
29 October 1955	10th	Wolverhampton Wanderers	A	L	0–1		47,006
5 November 1955	8th	Chelsea	H	W	3–0	Astall 2, Boyd	30,499
12 November 1955	11th	Blackpool	A	L	0–2		21,967
19 November 1955	8th	Huddersfield Town	H	W	5–0	Brown 2, Murphy, Astall, Warhurst	24,841
26 November 1955	10th	Cardiff City	A	L	1–2	Brown	23,638
3 December 1955	7th	Arsenal	H	W	4–0	Kinsey 2, Brown, Astall	35,765
10 December 1955	9th	Bolton Wanderers	A	L	0–6		15,793
17 December 1955	10th	Manchester United	A	L	1–2	Brown	27,936
24 December 1955	13th	Sheffield United	H	L	0–2		23,822
26 December 1955	13th	Everton	H	W	6–2	Brown 2, Kinsey 3, Govan	25,541
27 December 1955	15th	Everton	A	L	1–5	Astall	42,236
31 December 1955	14th	Preston North End	A	D	1–1	Astall	25,834
14 January 1956	16th	Burnley	H	L	1–2	Kinsey	27,388
21 January 1956	16th	Luton Town	A	W	1–0	Brown	18,970
4 February 1956	14th	Charlton Athletic	H	W	4–0	Brown 3, Kinsey	24,447
11 February 1956	11th	Tottenham Hotspur	A	W	1–0	Astall	26,141
25 February 1956	9th	Portsmouth	H	W	3–2	Kinsey 2, Brown	31,955
7 March 1956	8th	Huddersfield Town	A	W	3–2	Brown	9,224
10 March 1956	8th	Wolverhampton Wanderers	H	D	0–0		45,161
21 March 1956	6th	Chelsea	A	W	2–1	Kinsey, Govan	12,637
24 March 1956	7th	Blackpool	H	L	1–2	Murphy	47,933
31 March 1956	10th	Manchester City	A	D	1–1	Murphy	44,777
2 April 1956	8th	West Bromwich Albion	H	W	2–0	Brown, Murphy	38,891
3 April 1956	4th	West Bromwich Albion	A	W	2–0	Murphy 2	35,858
7 April 1956	3rd	Cardiff City	H	W	2–1	Brown, Baker og	37,154
14 April 1956	6th	Arsenal	A	L	0–1		31,775
18 April 1956	7th	Sunderland	A	L	0–1		14,824
21 April 1956	4th	Bolton Wanderers	H	W	5–2	Kinsey, Warmington, Astall, Wheeler 2 ogs	29,640

=== League table (part) ===
Final First Division table (part)
Pos	Club	Pld	W	D	L	F	A	GA	Pts
4th	Manchester City	42	18	10	14	82	69	1.19	46
5th	Arsenal	42	18	10	14	60	61	0.98	46
6th	Birmingham City	42	18	9	15	75	57	1.32	45
7th	Burnley	42	18	8	16	64	54	1.19	44
8th	Bolton Wanderers	42	18	7	17	71	58	1.22	43
Key	Pos = League position; Pld = Matches played; W = Matches won; D = Matches drawn; L = Matches lost; F = Goals for; A = Goals against; GA = Goal average; Pts = Points								
Source									

== FA Cup ==
Round	Date	Opponents	Venue	Result	Score F–A	Scorers	Attendance
Third round	7 January 1956	Torquay United	A	W	7–1	Astall, Brown 3, Kinsey, Murphy 2	18,730
Fourth round	28 January 1956	Leyton Orient	A	W	4–0	Brown 2, Murphy, Finney	24,727
Fifth round	18 February 1956	West Bromwich Albion	A	W	1–0	Murphy	57,213
Sixth round	3 March 1956	Arsenal	A	W	3–1	Astall, Murphy, Brown	67,872
Semi-final	17 March 1956	Sunderland	Hillsborough, Sheffield	W	3–0	Kinsey, Astall, Brown	65,107
Final	5 May 1956	Manchester City	Wembley, London	L	1–3	Kinsey	98,982

== Inter-Cities Fairs Cup ==
Round	Date	Opponents	Venue	Result	Score F–A	Scorers	Attendance
Group B	15 May 1956	Internazionale	A	D	0–0		8,000
Group B	24 May 1956	Zagreb XI	A	W	1–0	Brown	12,000

== Appearances and goals ==
Players marked † left the club during the playing season.
Key to positions: GK – Goalkeeper; FB – Full back; HB – Half back; FW – Forward

Players' appearances and goals by competition
Pos.	Nat.	Name	League		FA Cup		Fairs Cup		Total	
Pos.	Nat.	Name	Apps	Goals	Apps	Goals	Apps	Goals	Apps	Goals
GK	ENG	Gil Merrick	38	0	6	0	2	0	46	0
GK	ENG	Johnny Schofield	4	0	0	0	0	0	4	0
FB	ENG	George Allen	2	0	0	0	1	0	3	0
FB	ENG	Jack Badham	16	0	1	0	2	0	19	0
FB	ENG	Ken Green	28	0	6	0	1	0	35	0
FB	ENG	Jeff Hall	38	0	6	0	0	0	44	0
FB	SCO	Roy Martin †	2	0	0	0	0	0	2	0
HB	ENG	Len Boyd	32	3	6	0	1	0	39	3
HB	ENG	Bert Linnecor	6	0	0	0	0	0	6	0
HB	ENG	Johnny Newman	14	0	1	0	2	0	17	0
HB	ENG	Trevor Smith	30	0	6	0	0	0	36	0
HB	ENG	Roy Warhurst	30	2	4	0	1	0	35	2
HB	ENG	Peter Warmington	2	1	0	0	1	0	3	1
HB	ENG	Johnny Watts	10	0	0	0	1	0	11	0
FW	ENG	Gordon Astall	39	12	6	3	0	0	45	15
FW	ENG	Bill Bradbury †	1	0	0	0	0	0	1	0
FW	ENG	Eddy Brown	38	21	6	7	2	1	46	29
FW	ENG	Geoff Cox	3	0	0	0	2	0	5	0
FW	ENG	Bill Finney	10	0	2	1	1	0	13	1
FW	SCO	Alex Govan	36	4	3	0	1	0	40	4
FW	ENG	Dennis Hill †	1	0	0	0	0	0	1	0
FW	WAL	Noel Kinsey	34	15	6	3	2	0	42	18
FW	ENG	Jackie Lane	10	1	1	0	1	0	12	1
FW	ENG	Peter Murphy	38	11	6	5	2	0	46	16

== See also ==
- Birmingham City F.C. seasons
