= Len Boyd =

English professional footballer (1923–2008)

- Boyd as a Birmingham City player

Personal information
- Full name: Leonard Arthur Miller Boyd
- Date of birth: 11 November 1923
- Place of birth: Plaistow, Essex, England
- Date of death: 14 February 2008 (aged 84)
- Place of death: Melton Mowbray, Leicestershire, England
- Position: Wing half

Youth career
- –: Ilford

Senior career*
Years	Team	Apps	(Gls)
–	Royal Navy		
1945–1949	Plymouth Argyle	78	(5)
1949–1956	Birmingham City	255	(14)
1959	Hinckley Athletic		
Total		333	(19)

International career
1952	England B	1	(0)
- * Club domestic league appearances and goals

Leonard Arthur Miller Boyd (11 November 1923 − 14 February 2008) was an English professional footballer who played 333 matches in the Football League in the 1940s and 1950s. After serving in the Royal Navy during the Second World War, Boyd signed for Second Division club Plymouth Argyle, where he spent two seasons playing as an inside forward. When he began playing as a wing half, a position to which he was better suited, he attracted attention, and soon secured a transfer to the First Division with Birmingham City for what was for Plymouth a record fee.

Though his club was soon relegated, Boyd established himself in the first team and was appointed captain. He was chosen to represent England at "B" international level. An industrious, dynamic player, described by his goalkeeper Gil Merrick as "a good player and a bloody good captain", Boyd led the team to the championship of the Second Division in the 1954–55 season and to the FA Cup Final and sixth place in the league, still, as of 2018, Birmingham's record league placing, the following year. He played only once more for Birmingham, forced to retire by the back injury which had disrupted his final season with the club.

== Playing career ==
=== Early career ===
Boyd was born in Plaistow, Essex. He played for the West Ham Schools team alongside Ken Green, who was later to be a Birmingham teammate, and as a youth played for Ilford. The outbreak of the Second World War when Boyd was 15 delayed his entry into football as a career. He joined the Royal Navy, and while serving in Malta was spotted playing for a Navy team by a Plymouth Argyle supporter, who recommended him to the club. After a trial, Boyd signed professional forms in December 1945.

He made his debut on 12 October 1946, taking over at centre-half from Alf Miller for a Second Division match away at Leicester City which Plymouth lost 4–1. In his first season, Boyd played 16 league matches, mainly in the inside left position, and scored four of his five Plymouth goals. He played regularly on the right side of the forward line in the following season, but failed to score, and was regarded as "a promising but not exceptional inside-forward". When manager Jack Tresadern switched him to right half for the 1948–49 season, it became clear he was better suited to that position. After three consecutive seasons helping the Devon club avoid relegation from the Second Division, Boyd was sold to First Division club Birmingham City in January 1949 for a fee of £17,500, the first five-figure fee ever received by Plymouth for a player.

=== Birmingham City ===
He went straight into the first team as replacement for Frank Mitchell who had joined Chelsea earlier that month, and made his debut in a goalless draw away at Preston North End. In the 1949–50 season, his first full season with Birmingham, he established himself in the first team but was unable to prevent his new team's relegation to the Second Division. When Fred Harris retired at the end of that season, manager Bob Brocklebank appointed Boyd as his successor as club captain, a post which he retained for the remainder of his Birmingham career.

Under Boyd's captaincy Birmingham reached the semifinals of the 1950–51 FA Cup, when they were defeated by the powerful Blackpool side of Stanley Matthews and Stan Mortensen only after a replay. They twice came close to winning promotion, missing out by three points in the 1950–51 season and then on goal average the following year. Boyd's performances were rewarded with selection for England B against Netherlands B, a match played in front of a crowd of 60,000 at the Olympic Stadium in Amsterdam, but this, and a selection as reserve for a Football League representative team in 1954, was as close as he came to full international honours.

Manager Brocklebank significantly strengthened Birmingham's playing staff, but although the club nearly reached another semifinal in the 1952–53 FA Cup, losing in the sixth round to Tottenham Hotspur after two replays, their league results failed to improve. In late 1954, Arthur Turner was appointed manager, and his ability to instil a positive approach in the players transformed a team stagnating in mid-table into one needing to win the last match of the season, away at Doncaster Rovers, in order to be promoted as champions on goal average. Boyd led the team to a 5–1 win, later recalling:

The ground was packed and alive with supporters wearing the colours of Birmingham City. We knew we would win – and so too did those fans – and our performance that day was quite brilliant.

The same squad of players carried their promotion form into the 1955–56 season in the First Division, achieving the club's highest league finish of sixth place, and reaching the FA Cup final. They became attractive to the media; after the FA Cup semifinal victory, Boyd signed an exclusive contract committing himself and his teammates to appearing only on BBC programmes in the weeks leading up to the final.

Fellow wing half Roy Warhurst injured a thigh in the sixth round at Arsenal and played no further part in the season. Boyd himself had for some time been suffering from a debilitating back problem, and relied on injections to keep him playing; he missed five of the last seven matches of the season, but was passed fit on the Wednesday before the match. In the event, Boyd played, in Warhurst's position at left-half, and the 22-year-old Johnny Newman came in on the right. With Warhurst missing and Boyd out of position and not fully match-fit, Birmingham's strength and balance was disrupted, leaving them particularly vulnerable to Manchester City's unconventional style of play, known as the "Revie Plan". At half-time, a row erupted between the manager and some of the players, Boyd included, about their fitness; in the second half, whether due to physical and mental exhaustion or the effects of the row, Birmingham were soundly beaten.

On their return to Birmingham, the team received a civic welcome; Boyd told the thousands outside the Council House that the team felt they had let the supporters down. Though the crowd roared "No!", recriminations followed. Speaking fifty years later, goalkeeper Gil Merrick refused to attribute blame for the loss to Boyd's lack of fitness:

The reason why we lost, in my opinion, was nothing to do with Boydy who some claimed was unfit. Why we didn't perform in the second half was mainly because nothing was said in the dressing room at half time about stopping the damage caused by Don Revie. He was a good player and ran the game but at half time we should have talked about stopping him. Tackles should have been talked about, but they weren't. It was a lack of tackles that caused us to fold in the second half, and that's all I'm going to say. Don't put all the onus on Len Boyd. Len was a good player and a bloody good captain.

Boyd played only one more match for the club, two weeks after the Cup Final. Not risked in their first match in the Inter-Cities Fairs Cup, against Internazionale on a hard pitch in the San Siro, he played in their next, a 1–0 win against a Zagreb Select XI in Yugoslavia. Following a favourable specialist's report during the close season, Boyd took part in pre-season training, but his back still troubled him. On 17 August 1956, the day before Birmingham were to open their 1956–57 League campaign, Boyd's contract with the club was terminated at his own request.

== Style of play ==
Boyd was a tall man with a long stride. He was hard-working, combining industry with composure and skill on the ball. His dynamism was regularly mentioned; The Times' match report of the 1953 FA Cup sixth round replay against Tottenham Hotspur, a 2–2 draw in which Boyd scored the equalising goal and had his name taken, attributed Birmingham's second-half comeback to their captain's performance:

And behind it all there was the constant driving force of Boyd, their captain, at right-half. Boyd, in fact, one would say, was the final hero of a desperate day. Up in attack and back in defence he played a magnificent game to inspire and keep his colleagues going.

Against Arsenal in the 1956 cup run he was "a champion who covered every inch of Highbury's mud, a dynamo and a man of steel", and, later the same season, The Times' correspondent wondered rhetorically "was there ever such a human dynamo at wing-half?"

Birmingham based their success of the 1950s on "their acutely drilled and disciplined defence – founded upon the authority of their half-backs Boyd, Smith and Warhurst", though these three did much more than protect their defenders.

... the towering young Smith, centre-half in the England Intermediate (Under 23) XI, is flanked by two men, Boyd and Warhurst, who keep the ball flowing forward quickly all the time. There are no superfluous frills about them. Their accent is on a quick release along the lines of longitude. They are the real driving force.

They acquired a fearsome reputation: Boyd himself once played four matches carrying an injury which turned out to be a hairline fracture of his leg. Teammate Alex Govan, preferring to describe Boyd as "hard, very hard" rather than a "dirty player", recalled:

I used to think 'thank God I'm playing in front of them and not against them'! Birmingham probably had the hardest defenders in the First Division in those days, with Len, Trevor Smith, Roy Warhurst, Jeff Hall and Ken Green – no one liked the idea of playing against them.

== Life outside football ==
Boyd was married to Dolly, and had two children. He enjoyed oil painting as a hobby. According to Govan, "Len was a typical cockney really. He was hard on the pitch but soft off the field, he wouldn't do anybody a bad turn."

Boyd suffered from a fear of flying, which had on occasion caused difficulties in his football career. Chosen by the Birmingham County Football Association for a representative match in Hamburg in 1953, the players were already at the airport when he requested to be omitted from the team. While his teammates flew to Birmingham's Fairs Cup match in Milan, Boyd travelled across the English Channel by boat and then across France and into Italy by train.

When Boyd retired from professional football, the Birmingham City directors "had stated their readiness to help him in any venture he decided to take up". He chose to enter the licensed trade, and kept a public house in Birmingham. Having once said that "if I can't play in first-class football, I don't want to play any football at all", after two and a half years out of the game he changed his mind. In early 1959 he attempted a comeback with Leicestershire club Hinckley Athletic, but found himself unable to play a full match. He remained involved with football for a few more years, acting as coach and scout for Redditch of the West Midlands (Regional) League between 1960 and 1965. Settling in Melton Mowbray, Leicestershire, he went on to become one of the town's first traffic wardens. In later life he moved into a care home in Melton, where he died in February 2008 at the age of 84.

== Career statistics ==
Appearances and goals by club, season and competition
Club	Season	League			FA Cup		Fairs Cup		Total	
Club	Season	Division	Apps	Goals	Apps	Goals	Apps	Goals	Apps	Goals
Plymouth Argyle	1946–47	Second Division	16	4	0	0	—		16	4
Plymouth Argyle	1947–48	Second Division	37	0	1	0	—		38	0
Plymouth Argyle	1948–49	Second Division	25	1	1	0	—		26	1
Plymouth Argyle	Total		78	5	2	0	—		80	5
Birmingham City	1948–49	First Division	9	1	0	0	—		9	1
Birmingham City	1949–50	First Division	27	0	0	0	—		27	0
Birmingham City	1950–51	Second Division	36	3	6	0	—		42	3
Birmingham City	1951–52	Second Division	37	0	0	0	—		37	0
Birmingham City	1952–53	Second Division	40	4	7	1	—		47	5
Birmingham City	1953–54	Second Division	35	2	2	0	—		37	2
Birmingham City	1954–55	Second Division	39	1	4	0	—		43	1
Birmingham City	1955–56	First Division	32	3	6	0	1	0	39	3
Birmingham City	Total		255	14	25	1	1	0	281	15
Career total			333	19	27	1	1	0	361	20

== Honours ==
Birmingham City

- Football League Second Division: 1954–55
- FA Cup runner-up: 1955–56
