= Fred Slater =

English footballer (1925–2002)

Personal information
- Full name: Frederick Benjamin Slater
- Date of birth: 25 September 1925
- Place of birth: Burton upon Trent, England
- Date of death: September 2002 (aged 76–77)
- Place of death: Isle of Wight, England
- Position: Centre forward

Senior career*
Years	Team	Apps	(Gls)
–	Burton Albion		
1947–1951	Birmingham City	5	(1)
1951–1952	York City	13	(3)
1952–1955	Corby Town		
1955–1957	Nuneaton Borough		
1957–1959	Hinckley Athletic		
- * Club domestic league appearances and goals

Frederick Benjamin Slater (25 September 1925 – September 2002) was an English professional footballer who played in the Football League for Birmingham City and York City, primarily as a centre forward. He also played in non-league football for Burton Albion, Corby Town, Nuneaton Borough and Hinckley Athletic.

== Life and career ==
Slater was born in 1925 in Burton upon Trent, Staffordshire. He played football while in the Army as well as for home-town club Burton Albion, and had a reputation as a "rough and tumble striker", by the time Birmingham City signed him on professional forms on 13 November 1947. He was prolific in reserve-team football, scored in first-team friendlies in Scotland and Switzerland, and made his senior debut on 13 November 1948 – a year to the day after signing – standing in for Cyril Trigg. Ten minutes into the match, at home to Huddersfield Town in the First Division, he injured a leg in a tackle. He played on, in increasing discomfort, went to hospital after the match, and X-rays revealed a broken bone, just above the ankle. He said afterwards, "I thought it was a bit painful, but had not realised it was as bad as that." He missed only four months of the season, but by the time he was fit again, Jimmy Dailey had taken over at centre forward. It was the first instance of what the Sports Argus dubbed "an unhappy knack of bumping into trouble". Over the next 18 months, he injured himself tripping on the stairs, twisted his ankle when he trod on a brick, and what he thought was "just a cold" had turned into pneumonia that left him hospitalised for weeks. He played just five first-team games for Birmingham, and was transfer-listed at the end of the 1950–51 season.

In June 1951, Slater signed for York City of the Third Division North. After York's opening-day opponents, Lincoln City, took the lead after 14 minutes, Slater equalised a minute later, but Lincoln regained and kept the lead. He failed to score in the next five matches and lost his place. Brought back into the side to face Darlington at the end of September, Slater scored both goals in a 2–1 win, but those goals were his last for the first team. He made 14 appearances in league and FA Cup, and was placed on the transfer list.

There were no takers from the Football League, and he moved into non-league football with Corby Town, newly admitted to the Midland League. He helped them finish as runners-up in his first season, scored 38 goals in his second, but lost form at the start of his third. In December 1954, Corby turned down Peterborough United's offer of a player swap with the ageing and equally out of form Doug Taft. Slater then missed six weeks with a rib injury, but his form returned along with his fitness, and according to the Peterborough Citizen & Advertiser, "there has been a perceptible improvement on the part of Corby since Fred Slater returned and started to score goals again"

He signed for Nuneaton Borough for the 1955–56 season, and finished it with 50 goals in all competitions as his team won the Birmingham League–Birmingham Senior Cup double. He set a club record of 8 goals in a single match, an 11–1 league defeat of Bilston. The season summary on the club's heritage website records that without Slater, Nuneaton would not have won the title:

Slater is one of those chaps who never win matches before they start; who never holds inquests afterwards. But when he got on the field he hustled and bustled for the whole 90 minutes with one thing uppermost in his mind – goals. Nobody would describe Fred as a stylist. Nor is he a clever ball player. But he has most of the other attributes; he is big, strong, has an uncanny sense of positional play, is a powerful shot and is particularly dangerous with his head.

Although he top-scored again in 1956–57 with 23 goals, his form was poor compared with that of the previous season, and he was released. He spent the next two seasons with Hinckley Athletic, another Birmingham League club. By December 1958, the Leicester Evening Mail was suggesting that some of those ageing professionals who had been out of the senior team, including Slater, might be allowed to leave. A couple of weeks later, he returned to the first team and scored twice, "to show he is far from finished." He left the professional game at the end of the season, but played on for a few years for his works team, Dunlop, in the Birmingham Works League.

Slater died in September 2002 on the Isle of Wight.

== Career statistics ==
Appearances and goals by club, season and competition
Club	Season	League			FA Cup		Total	
Club	Season	Division	Apps	Goals	Apps	Goals	Apps	Goals
Birmingham City	1948–49	First Division	3	0	0	0	3	0
Birmingham City	1949–50	First Division	2	1	0	0	2	1
Birmingham City	1950–51	First Division	0	0	0	0	0	0
Birmingham City	Total		5	1	0	0	5	1
York City	1951–52	Third Division North	13	3	1	0	14	3
Career total			18	4	1	0	19	4

== Honours ==
Nuneaton Borough

- Birmingham & District League Division 1: 1955–56
- Birmingham Senior Cup: 1955–56

== Sources ==
- Matthews, Tony (1995). Birmingham City: A Complete Record. Derby: Breedon Books. ISBN 978-1-85983-010-9.
- "Nuneaton Borough 1945–1958 – Part 2" (PDF). From Town to Town: Nuneaton's Footballing Heritage. Nuneaton Town Supporters Co-operative. 2016. Archived from the original (PDF) on 16 April 2021.
