= Arthur Turner (footballer, born 1909) =

English footballer and manager

Personal information
- Full name: Arthur Owen Turner
- Date of birth: 1 April 1909
- Place of birth: Chesterton, Staffordshire, England
- Date of death: 12 January 1994 (aged 84)
- Place of death: Sheffield, England
- Height: 5 ft 10 in (1.78 m)
- Position: Centre-half

Youth career
- Downing Tileries
- Woolstanton PSA
- 1929–1930: West Bromwich Albion

Senior career*
Years	Team	Apps	(Gls)
1930–1939	Stoke City	290	(17)
1939–1948	Birmingham City	39	(0)
1948	Southport	28	(0)
Total		357	(17)

Managerial career
- 1948: Southport (player-manager)
- 1948–1951: Crewe Alexandra
- 1951–1953: Stoke City (assistant manager)
- 1954–1958: Birmingham City
- 1959–1969: Headington United / Oxford United
- * Club domestic league appearances and goals

Arthur Owen Turner (1 April 1909 – 12 January 1994) was an English professional association football player and manager. He played as a centre-half for Stoke City, Birmingham City and Southport. Turner was player-manager of Southport, managed Crewe Alexandra and was assistant at Stoke before joining Birmingham City as manager. He won the Second Division championship in 1954–55, led them the following season to the 1956 FA Cup Final and their highest ever top flight finish, and became the first man to manage an English club side in European competition when he took the club to the semi-final of the Inter-Cities Fairs Cup in 1958. Turner went on to manage the transformation of Southern League club Headington United into Oxford United of the Second Division of the Football League.

== Playing career ==
Arthur Turner was born in Chesterton, Staffordshire. Following a spell as an amateur with West Bromwich Albion, he signed professional forms for local club Stoke City of the Second Division in 1930. He was a strong defensive half-back, good in the air and on the ground, reliable and influential. He won a Second Division championship medal with Stoke in the 1932–33 season; the club history described him as one of "the real bedrocks" of the promotion side. He was appointed captain of Stoke, in a side that included Stanley Matthews, and in all competitions played over 300 games for the club. In 1939 he was sold to Birmingham for a fee of £6,000.

His contribution in his first few months at Birmingham was not enough to prevent their relegation from the First Division, and the suspension of league football later that year for the duration of the Second World War seriously disrupted his career. He was 30 when war was declared. During the war Turner played nearly 200 games for Birmingham, captaining them to the championship of the wartime Football League South and to the semifinal of the first post-war FA Cup.

== Managerial career ==
In 1948, Turner joined Southport of the Third Division North as player-manager; he played his last game in October 1948 at the age of 39. He was appointed manager of Crewe Alexandra in October 1948 and stayed there for three years, returning to Stoke City as assistant manager in December 1951 under first Bob McGrory and then Frank Taylor.

=== Birmingham City ===
In November 1954 Turner replaced Bob Brocklebank as manager of former club Birmingham City. Brocklebank had assembled an excellent group of players – including Jeff Hall, Len Boyd, Roy Warhurst, Eddy Brown, Peter Murphy, Alex Govan – but they were not performing to their ability; Turner made them do so. When he joined, the club lay 12th in the Second Division, with one away win to their name; in the rest of the season, they lost only once more away from home. They scored 92 league goals, their best goal return since the 19th century, with all five first choice forwards reaching double figures, inflicted a club record 9–1 defeat on Liverpool, and confirmed themselves as champions with a 5–1 win away at Doncaster Rovers.

Birmingham City's official history rated 1955–56 as the club's best season to date. Turner led the team he inherited to their highest league finish, sixth place in the First Division, only four points off runners-up spot. They reached the 1956 FA Cup Final, losing to Manchester City 3–1 in the game best remembered for City goalkeeper Bert Trautmann playing the last 20 minutes with a broken bone in his neck. The following year he led them to the FA Cup semifinal, only to lose to Manchester United's "Busby Babes". Also in 1956, Turner became the first manager to take an English club side into European competition when Birmingham City represented the city of Birmingham in the inaugural Inter-Cities Fairs Cup. They reached the semifinal, going out to eventual winners Barcelona in a replay on a neutral ground after the original tie had finished 4–4 on aggregate.

His record in the transfer market was sound. He brought in England under-23 international Dick Neal to replace Len Boyd, bought wingers Harry Hooper and future England player Mike Hellawell, and gave first professional contracts to youngsters Malcolm Beard and Colin Withers.

In January 1958, Pat Beasley joined the club; Beasley had believed he was coming as Turner's assistant, but chairman Harry Morris announced to the press that he was to be appointed joint manager. Turner, who found about this arrangement not from the club but from the press, threatened to resign; he was persuaded to stay "for the time being", but finally left in September 1958.

=== Oxford United ===
Oxford United's club website pinpoints the appointment of Turner as manager of the then Southern League side Headington United as a turning point in the club's history. He joined on New Year's Day 1959. Not long afterwards, First Division club Leeds United approached him to take over as their manager; though favourite to take the job, the Headington directors matched Leeds' salary offer, and Turner chose to stay.

There was no automatic promotion into the Football League in those days; clubs had to be elected, and the likelihood of election depended largely on how the chairmen of other league clubs perceived them. That year, Turner persuaded the directors to change the name of the club to Oxford United, to increase public awareness of the club and to broaden its appeal. He employed more professional players and brought in young players from top clubs. The likes of Graham Atkinson, Cyril Beavon and Maurice Kyle all joined from junior teams of bigger clubs, and each went on to play over 300 games for Oxford United. Turner's key signing, the 20-year-old Ron Atkinson, joined from Aston Villa, was soon appointed captain, and went on to play 560 first team games for the club. The combination of Turner's management and Atkinson's captaincy brought two Southern League titles in two years, and when Accrington Stanley went bankrupt in 1962, Oxford United took their place in the Fourth Division of the Football League.

Two years later Turner's team eliminated Blackburn Rovers, who at the time lay second in the First Division, in the fifth round of the FA Cup. They thus became the first Fourth Division side to reach the sixth round. In 1964–65, he led them to promotion from the Fourth Division, and three years later to the championship of the Third. By this time the young players who had been the mainstay of Oxford's rise through the divisions were ageing or retired. Turner had no money to strengthen the side for its Second Division campaign and struggled with what he had. In April 1969, he became General Manager of the club, leaving the running of the team to Ron Saunders, and in February 1972 he was dismissed when the club admitted they were unable to afford to keep him in post.

Turner remained active in football into the 1980s. He was employed as a scout for Rotherham United and Sheffield Wednesday. He died in Sheffield on 12 January 1994 at the age of 84.

== Career statistics ==
Club	Season	League			FA Cup		Total	
Club	Season	Division	Apps	Goals	Apps	Goals	Apps	Goals
Stoke City	1930–31	Second Division	7	0	0	0	7	0
Stoke City	1931–32	Second Division	35	0	5	0	40	0
Stoke City	1932–33	Second Division	42	5	2	0	44	5
Stoke City	1933–34	First Division	40	1	4	0	44	1
Stoke City	1934–35	First Division	39	4	1	0	40	4
Stoke City	1935–36	First Division	42	4	5	0	47	4
Stoke City	1936–37	First Division	42	3	2	0	44	3
Stoke City	1937–38	First Division	32	0	3	0	35	0
Stoke City	1938–39	First Division	11	0	0	0	11	0
Stoke City	Total		290	17	22	0	312	17
Birmingham	1938–39	First Division	12	0	0	0	12	0
Birmingham City	1945–46	War League	—		10	0	10	0
Birmingham City	1946–47	Second Division	27	0	4	0	31	0
Birmingham City	Total		39	0	14	0	53	0
Southport	1947–48	Third Division North	17	0	0	0	17	0
Southport	1948–49	Third Division North	11	0	0	0	11	0
Southport	Total		28	0	0	0	28	0
Career total			357	17	36	0	393	17

== Honours ==
=== As player ===
- with Stoke City
  - Football League Second Division champions 1933.
- with Birmingham City
  - Football League South champions 1946.

=== As manager ===
- with Birmingham City
  - Football League Second Division champions 1955.
  - FA Cup runners up 1956.
  - Inter-Cities Fairs Cup semi-final 1958.
- with Headington United / Oxford United
  - Southern League runners up 1960.
  - Southern League champions 1961.
  - Southern League champions and election to the Football League 1962.
  - FA Cup quarter-final (first Fourth Division club to reach this round) 1964.
  - Fourth Division promotion 1965.
  - Third Division champions 1968.
