= Roy Martin =

Roy Martin may refer to:

- Roy Martin (footballer) (1929–2024), Scottish footballer
- Roy Martin (politician) (1921–2002), American politician
- Roy Martin (sprinter) (born 1966), American sprinter
- Roy Peter Martin (1931–2014), English author
