= Linnecor =

Linnecor is a surname. Notable people with the surname include:

- Bert Linnecor (1933–2012), English footballer
- Keith Linnecor
