= Hymie Kloner =

Lithuanian-born South African soccer player

Personal information
- Date of birth: 23 May 1929
- Place of birth: Lithuania
- Date of death: July 2010 (aged 81)
- Place of death: South Africa
- Position: Right half

Senior career*
| Years | Team | Apps | (Gls) |
| – | Marist Brothers (Transvaal) | | |
| 1950 | Birmingham City | 1 | (0) |
| – | Rangers FC | | |

International career
| 1950 | South Africa | 4 | (0) |
- * Club domestic league appearances and goals

Hymie Kloner (23 May 1929 – July 2010) was a South African professional footballer who won four caps for his national team and who played in the Football League for Birmingham City. He played as a right half.

Kloner was born in Lithuania, the son of Jewish parents. The family emigrated to South Africa when Kloner was a boy. Though his parents were not keen on his playing football, the principal of the Jewish Government School encouraged him, and he eventually played for the Marist Brothers club. In June and July 1950, the 21-year-old Kloner played four matches for the South Africa national football team against a touring Australia team. In October 1950 Kloner represented South Africa at the 1950 Maccabiah Games.

Later that year he came to England as a triallist. He was taken on by Birmingham City, and played once in the Football League, on 2 December 1950, standing in for Len Boyd in the Second Division game away to Leeds United which Leeds won 3–0. Kloner returned to South Africa that same month, and continued his football career domestically with Rangers FC. He played representative football for Southern Transvaal, and in 1954 played against a touring Israeli team.^{[A]}

In later life Kloner took up bowls. He died in July 2010.

== Notes ==
A. The Jewish Report, while confirming Kloner's appearance for the Southern Transvaal side against the touring Israelis, also suggests that he played for the South African national team in the 1 May 1954 test match, though the RSSSF would disagree.
