= Tommy Capel =

English footballer

Personal information
- Full name: Thomas Arthur Capel
- Date of birth: 27 June 1922
- Place of birth: Chorlton-on-Medlock, Manchester, England
- Date of death: 5 October 2009 (aged 87)
- Place of death: Nottingham, England
- Position: Inside left

Senior career*
Years	Team	Apps	(Gls)
- Droylsden
1941–1947	Manchester City	9	(2)
1947–1949	Chesterfield	62	(27)
1949	Birmingham City	8	(2)
1949–1954	Nottingham Forest	154	(69)
1954–1955	Coventry City	36	(19)
1955–1956	Halifax Town	7	(1)
1956–19??	Heanor Town		
- * Club domestic league appearances and goals

Thomas Arthur Capel (27 June 1922 – 5 October 2009) was an English professional footballer who scored 120 goals from 276 appearances in the Football League playing for Manchester City, Chesterfield, Birmingham City, Nottingham Forest, Coventry City and Halifax Town. He played as an inside left.

== Career ==
Capel played football for a works team, Gosling's, in Manchester, and for Droylsden, before joining Manchester City in 1941, He made his competitive debut on 4 January 1947 in a 1–0 win in the Football League Second Division away at Chesterfield. Bob Brocklebank signed him for Chesterfield in October 1947. He scored on his league debut for the club, finished his first season as the club's leading scorer with 16 despite joining well after the start of the season, and in something under two seasons scored a total of 27 league goals from 62 appearances. In the 1949 close season Brocklebank signed him for a second time, taking him to First Division club Birmingham City for a fee of £10,000.

Capel, described as a "powerful, bustling player", failed to settle at Birmingham, and moved to Nottingham Forest a few months later. He and Wally Ardron formed "a lethal striking partnership" which contributed to Forest, under the management of Billy Walker, winning the Third Division South title in the 1950–51 season. Capel spent four-and-a-half seasons at Forest, and scored 72 goals from 162 appearances in all competitions.

In the 1954 close season, Capel joined Coventry City, for whom he scored 19 goals from 34 league matches in the Third Division South, and finished off his league career with a few months at Third Division North club Halifax Town, thus completing the set of playing in all four divisions of the Football League.

Capel spent the 1956–57 season with non-league side Heanor Town. They won the Central Alliance North title, scoring 158 goals in the 30 games available, and finished the season with a flourish. Capel had scored four in a match for Nottingham Forest against Gillingham in 1950: he went one better in Heanor's last game of the season against Sutton Town, "scoring all five goals including one from the penalty spot with his unfavoured right foot".

== Personal life ==
Capel was born in Chorlton-on-Medlock, Manchester. He served in the Royal Marines during the Second World War, alongside fellow footballers Eddie Quigley and Ken Oliver. His younger brother Freddie also became a professional footballer. The pair were on Chesterfield's books at the same time, but played together only once, for the reserve team.

He died in October 2009, aged 87.
