= Peter Warmington =

English footballer

Personal information
- Full name: Peter John Warmington
- Date of birth: 8 April 1934 (age 92)
- Place of birth: Wythall, England
- Position: Inside forward

Youth career
- 1949–1952: Birmingham City

Senior career*
Years	Team	Apps	(Gls)
1952–1957	Birmingham City	8	(3)
1957–19??	Bromsgrove Rovers		
–	Redditch United		
–	Droitwich Town		
- * Club domestic league appearances and goals

Peter John Warmington (born 8 April 1934) is an English former professional footballer who played in the Football League for Birmingham City.

Warmington was born in Wythall, Worcestershire. When he left school in 1949, he joined Birmingham City as a junior, and turned professional three years later. Described as a "talented goalscorer" but injury-prone, he scored on his debut in the Second Division on 8 September 1954 in a 4–0 win at home to Ipswich Town. He scored again two games later, but soon lost his place, and when the club signed the prolific Eddy Brown a few weeks later Warmington was reduced to covering for the inside trio of Noel Kinsey, Brown and Peter Murphy. He played occasionally at half-back, as he did in Birmingham's first match in the inaugural staging of the Inter-Cities Fairs Cup, a goalless draw against Internazionale in Milan in May 1956 when Len Boyd and Roy Warhurst were injured. After playing only nine first-team games in his Birmingham career, Warmington dropped into non-league football in his native Worcestershire with Bromsgrove Rovers, Redditch United and Droitwich Town.
