= Derek Carr (footballer) =

English footballer (1927–2004)

Personal information
- Full name: Derek Henry Carr
- Date of birth: 1 September 1927
- Place of birth: Blidworth, England
- Date of death: 6 July 2004 (aged 76)
- Place of death: Birmingham, England
- Position: Utility player

Senior career*
Years	Team	Apps	(Gls)
- Lockheed Leamington
1947–1950	Birmingham City	3	(0)
1950–195?	Rugby Town		
- Evesham United
- Boldmere St. Michaels
- * Club domestic league appearances and goals

Derek Henry Carr (1 September 1927 – 6 July 2004) was an English footballer who played in the Football League for Birmingham City. Carr, a utility player, joined Birmingham City from Lockheed Leamington in December 1947, and made his debut in the First Division on 22 October 1949 in a goalless draw away at Everton. He played twice more in the 1949–50 season, and also worked in the offices at St Andrew's, before moving into non-league football with Rugby Town, Evesham United, and Boldmere St. Michaels.

Carr was born in Blidworth, near Mansfield, Nottinghamshire, and died in Birmingham.
