= Eddie O'Hara (footballer, born 1927) =

Irish footballer

Personal information
- Full name: Edward Patrick O'Hara
- Date of birth: 22 February 1927
- Place of birth: Dalkey, Ireland
- Date of death: 8 March 1987 (aged 60)
- Position: Outside left

Senior career*
Years	Team	Apps	(Gls)
194?–1949	Dundalk		
1949–1951	Birmingham City	6	(0)
1951–19??	Hereford United		
–	Sligo Rovers		
–	Drumcondra		
–	Lockheed Leamington		
–	Hereford United		
- * Club domestic league appearances and goals

Edward Patrick O'Hara (22 February 1927 – 8 March 1987) was an Irish professional footballer who played in the English Football League for Birmingham City.

O'Hara was born in Dalkey, which was then in County Dublin. An outside left, he played for Dundalk in the League of Ireland alongside Jim Higgins, before the pair joined Birmingham City in 1949. Both players went straight into the starting eleven, making their First Division debuts on 19 November 1949 in a 1–1 draw at home to Fulham. There was strong competition for places on the wing, from Johnny Berry, Harold Roberts and Jackie Stewart among others. O'Hara played only once more that season, and four times in the Second Division in 1951, before moving on to non-league club Hereford United. He then returned to Ireland to play for Sligo Rovers and Drumcondra before coming back to England with Lockheed Leamington and a second spell with Hereford United.

O'Hara died in 1987 at the age of 60.
