= Bert Linnecor =

English footballer (1933-2012)

Personal information
- Full name: Albert Roy Linnecor
- Date of birth: 30 November 1933
- Place of birth: Birmingham, England
- Date of death: 25 November 2012 (aged 78)
- Place of death: Lincoln, England
- Positions: Wing half; inside forward

Youth career
- –: Brookhill Juniors

Senior career*
Years	Team	Apps	(Gls)
1950–1957	Birmingham City	17	(0)
1957–1964	Lincoln City	264	(52)
1964–1967	Boston		
1967–1969	Grantham Town	71	(10)
1969–1970	Worksop Town		
1970–1973	Bourne Town		

Managerial career
- 1974–19xx: Ruston Sports
- * Club domestic league appearances and goals

Albert Roy Linnecor (30 November 1933 – 25 November 2012) was an English professional footballer who made 281 appearances in the Football League playing for Birmingham City and Lincoln City. He played as a wing half or inside forward.

== Career ==
Linnecor was born in the Nechells district of Birmingham. He attended Lea Village School and played representative schools football for Saltley Boys. When he left school he worked for the Hercules Cycle and Motor Company, assembling bicycles, and played for his works team on Saturday mornings and for Brookhill Juniors on Sundays. A Birmingham City supporter, he signed for the club in 1950, initially as an amateur. After completing his national service in the Royal Army Service Corps, he turned professional in May 1952.

He had to wait nearly four years for his first-team debut, which came on 7 March 1956, deputising for the injured Roy Warhurst in a First Division game at Huddersfield Town which finished 1–1. One of several players tried in the half-back line in the run-up to the 1956 FA Cup Final, Linnecor was not selected for that game. He played 11 times in the following season, and in April 1957 was sold to Lincoln City as a makeweight in the £15,000 deal which took Dick Neal in the opposite direction.

After narrowly avoiding relegation from the Second Division in 1957, Linnecor remained at Lincoln for the rest of his Football League career, a further seven full seasons, during which he scored 55 goals from 287 appearances in all competitions. He is remembered for the hat-trick he scored against Liverpool at Anfield in 1960 to give Lincoln a 3–1 victory and inflict on Liverpool their first home league defeat of the year. In the 1964 close season, Linnecor left Lincoln, by then in the Fourth Division, and moved into non-league football with Boston, newly formed and playing in the Lincolnshire League.

He then played for Grantham Town, where he scored 11 goals from 88 appearances, helping the club reach the second round of the 1968–69 FA Cup, where they were defeated only in the last few minutes of the match by that season's League Cup winners Swindon Town, and to victory in the Midland League Cup. After that he played for Worksop Town and Bourne Town, whom he assisted to successive United Counties League titles, and coached junior players at Lincoln City.

After leaving full-time football, Linnecor worked as a salesman before becoming a storeman at Ruston's. He managed Ruston Sports football team for a number of years, and was a vice-president of the club. On retirement, Linnecor and his wife, Beryl, settled in the Lincoln area. Linnecor died on 25 November 2012.
