= Tony Blake (English footballer) =

English footballer

Personal information
- Full name: Antony John Blake
- Date of birth: 26 February 1927
- Place of birth: Cofton Hackett, England
- Date of death: 31 October 2014 (aged 87)
- Place of death: Worcester, England
- Position: Full back

Senior career*
Years	Team	Apps	(Gls)
- Rubery & Rednal British Legion
1948–1952	Birmingham City	2	(0)
1952–1953	Gillingham	10	(1)
- * Club domestic league appearances and goals

Antony John Blake (26 February 1927 – 31 October 2014) was an English professional footballer who played in the Football League for Birmingham City and Gillingham.

Blake was born in Cofton Hackett, Worcestershire. He played football for Rubery & Rednal British Legion as a centre forward before joining Birmingham City in October 1948. While in Birmingham's junior teams, Blake was converted to play at full back, and it was as a left back that he made his first-team debut on 18 February 1950, deputising for Dennis Jennings in the First Division match away at Bolton Wanderers, a game which Birmingham lost 1–0. Blake played once more that season, but then returned to the reserves, and in the 1952 close season moved on to Gillingham.

Due to injuries to other players, he made his Gillingham debut in his former position as a striker against Crystal Palace on 3 September 1952, and marked the occasion with a goal. He made nine further appearances for the club during the 1952–53 season in his more usual defensive role, but then sustained a serious knee injury. An operation in the spring of 1953 proved unsuccessful and he was forced into retirement. He returned to the Midlands where he took a job at an engineering firm.

Blake died in Worcester in 2014 at the age of 87.
