= Jeff Hall (footballer) =

English footballer (1929–1959)

Personal information
- Full name: Jeffrey James Hall
- Date of birth: 7 September 1929
- Place of birth: Scunthorpe, Lincolnshire, England
- Date of death: 4 April 1959 (aged 29)
- Place of death: Birmingham, Warwickshire, England
- Position: Right back

Youth career
- Bradford Park Avenue

Senior career*
Years	Team	Apps	(Gls)
- REME
1950–1959	Birmingham City	227	(1)

International career
1955	England B	1	(0)
1955–1957	England	17	(0)
- * Club domestic league appearances and goals

Jeffrey James Hall (7 September 1929 – 4 April 1959) was an English footballer who played as a right back for Birmingham City and England.

It was the death of Hall – a young, fit, international footballer – from polio which helped to kick-start widespread public acceptance in Britain of the need for vaccination. Though the disease was generally feared and the Salk vaccine was available, takeup had been slow. In the weeks following Hall's death, and after his widow, Dawn, spoke on television about her loss, demand for immunisation rocketed. Emergency vaccination clinics had to be set up and supplies of the vaccine flown in from the United States to cope with demand.

== Biography ==
Hall was born in Scunthorpe, Lincolnshire, and brought up in Wilsden, West Riding of Yorkshire. He had an older sister, Joan. After leaving school in 1945 he played for various junior clubs in the area before joining his local Football League club, Bradford Park Avenue, then in the Second Division, where he remained an amateur and never made a first-team appearance. It was while playing at right half for the Royal Electrical and Mechanical Engineers during his National Service that he was spotted by Birmingham City chief scout Walter Taylor, whose other successes included Gil Merrick, Trevor Smith and Ken Green. Hall signed on professional forms in May 1950.

He was converted to full back while playing for Birmingham City's reserve team, and made his first-team debut in that position in January 1951, though did not become a regular for the first team until 1953. He was part of the Birmingham City side that won the Second Division Championship in the 1954–55 Football League season. In 1955–56, he was part of the team that reached the club's highest ever finishing position, sixth in the First Division, and the Cup Final, losing 3–1 to Manchester City. He also played in Birmingham's Inter-Cities Fairs Cup campaign.

Also that season, he won his first representative honours, a cap for England B against West Germany B, soon followed by his first full cap for England, in a 5–1 victory in a friendly away to Denmark. He played every minute of this and England's next 16 international matches, until losing his place to West Bromwich Albion's Don Howe in October 1957. He finished on the losing side only once for England, and formed a fine understanding with regular defensive partner Roger Byrne of Manchester United.

Hall's last match for Birmingham City was away to Portsmouth on 21 March 1959. He became ill two days later and was admitted to hospital where he was diagnosed with polio. Over the next twelve days, his condition deteriorated; he became paralysed and lost his speech before dying on 4 April, aged 29. A clock and scoreboard were erected in his memory in Birmingham City's ground, St Andrew's, later that year; they did not survive the ground redevelopments of the mid-1990s. In his home town of Keighley, a trophy was presented in his honour to the newly formed Sunday League in the early 1960s for their cup competition which was still competed for until the league went into abeyance in 2010.

Birmingham City commissioned a second memorial clock to commemorate the 50th anniversary of Hall's death. Centrally sited above the main stand at St Andrew's, it was unveiled in September 2008 by Hall's teammates Alex Govan and Gil Merrick. However, adverse reaction to the clock's size and position provoked the club into ordering a larger replacement.

== Style of play ==
In Hall's obituary in the Birmingham Post, he is remembered as "one of [Birmingham City's] most skilful and popular players … who harnessed a keen intelligence to natural footballing ability to make a mark of considerable distinction on the game", adding that "his style of play, which tried to ensure any defensive move was turned smoothly and quickly to attack, and his demeanour on and off the field were classic examples to young devotees of the game". Meanwhile, The Daily Telegraph remarked that Hall "met the physical challenge on the field without flinching and with a fair tackle. Few defenders ever mastered the handicap of lack of height so competently". In 1956, The Sunday Times paid tribute to a Birmingham City defence termed "superb" and opined "clearly if [Gil] Merrick is an emperor among goalkeepers, then Hall and [Ken] Green, Birmingham's backs … are very worthy paladins".

== Career statistics ==
Appearances and goals by club, season and competition
Club	Season	League			FA Cup		Fairs Cup		Total	
Club	Season	Division	Apps	Goals	Apps	Goals	Apps	Goals	Apps	Goals
Birmingham City	1950–51	Second Division	1	0	0	0	—		1	0
Birmingham City	1951–52	Second Division	6	0	0	0	—		6	0
Birmingham City	1952–53	Second Division	16	0	7	0	—		23	0
Birmingham City	1953–54	Second Division	32	1	2	0	—		34	1
Birmingham City	1954–55	Second Division	32	0	4	0	—		36	0
Birmingham City	1955–56	First Division	38	0	6	0	0	0	44	0
Birmingham City	1956–57	First Division	36	0	7	0	1	0	44	0
Birmingham City	1957–58	First Division	37	0	1	0	2	0	40	0
Birmingham City	1958–59	First Division	29	0	6	0	2	0	37	0
Career total			227	1	33	0	5	0	265	1

== Honours ==
Birmingham City

- Football League Second Division: 1954–55
- FA Cup runner-up: 1955–56
