= Roy Martin (footballer) =

Scottish footballer (1929–2024)

Personal information
- Full name: Robert Martin
- Date of birth: 16 May 1929
- Place of birth: Glengarnock, Scotland
- Date of death: January 2024 (aged 94)
- Position: Full back

Youth career
- –: Kilwinning Rangers

Senior career*
Years	Team	Apps	(Gls)
1950–1956	Birmingham City	69	(0)
1956–1960	Derby County	81	(0)
1961–1963	Burton Albion		
1963–19??	Long Eaton United		
- * Club domestic league appearances and goals

Robert Martin (16 May 1929 – January 2024), generally known as Roy Martin, was a Scottish professional footballer who played as a full back. He made 150 appearances in the English Football League playing for Birmingham City and Derby County.

Born in Glengarnock, Ayrshire, Martin began his football career with local club Kilwinning Rangers. He came to England and signed professional forms for First Division Birmingham City in March 1950. By the time he made his first-team debut some nine months later, standing in for the injured Ken Green, the club had been relegated to the Second Division. In six years with the club he made 74 appearances in all competitions but was never first choice at full back, playing only as cover for Green, Jack Badham, and later, the England international Jeff Hall. In March 1956 he joined Derby County, and the following season helped them to win the championship of the Third Division (North).

Martin died in January 2024, at the age of 94.

== Sources ==
- Matthews, Tony (1995). Birmingham City: A Complete Record. Derby: Breedon Books. p. 110. ISBN 978-1-85983-010-9.
- "Roy Martin". Post War English & Scottish Football League A–Z Player's Database. Neil Brown.
