= Ken Green (footballer, born 1924) =

English footballer

Personal information
- Full name: Kenneth Green
- Date of birth: 27 April 1924
- Place of birth: Plaistow, London, England
- Date of death: 7 June 2001 (aged 77)
- Place of death: Sutton Coldfield, England
- Position: Full back

Youth career
- 1940–194?: Millwall

Senior career*
Years	Team	Apps	(Gls)
1943–1959	Birmingham City	401	(3)

International career
1954	England B	2	(0)
- * Club domestic league appearances and goals

Kenneth Green (27 April 1924 – 7 June 2001) was an English footballer who played as a full back. He played for Birmingham City from 1943 to 1959, making 443 appearances in all competitions and scoring 3 goals, and played in the 1956 FA Cup final which Birmingham lost to Manchester City 3–1. He earned two England B caps in 1954, and was subsequently named in the full England squad which travelled to Switzerland for the 1954 FIFA World Cup. However, he never made a senior appearance for England. Green died in Sutton Coldfield in 2001 at the age of 77.

== Career statistics ==
Appearances and goals by club, season and competition
Club	Season	League			FA Cup		Fairs Cup		Total	
Club	Season	Division	Apps	Goals	Apps	Goals	Apps	Goals	Apps	Goals
Birmingham City	1947–48	Second Division	35	0	1	0	—		36	0
Birmingham City	1948–49	First Division	41	0	3	0	—		44	0
Birmingham City	1949–50	First Division	29	0	1	0	—		30	0
Birmingham City	1950–51	Second Division	39	1	4	0	—		43	1
Birmingham City	1951–52	Second Division	33	1	2	0	—		35	1
Birmingham City	1952–53	Second Division	42	0	7	0	—		49	0
Birmingham City	1953–54	Second Division	39	0	2	0	—		41	0
Birmingham City	1954–55	Second Division	29	0	4	0	—		33	0
Birmingham City	1955–56	First Division	28	0	6	0	1	0	35	0
Birmingham City	1956–57	First Division	40	0	5	0	2	0	47	0
Birmingham City	1957–58	First Division	31	1	0	0	0	0	31	1
Birmingham City	1958–59	First Division	15	0	0	0	1	0	16	0
Career total			401	3	35	0	4	0	440	3

== Honours ==
Birmingham City

- Football League Second Division: 1947–48, 1954–55
- FA Cup runner-up: 1955–56

== Sources ==
- Matthews, Tony (1995). Birmingham City: A Complete Record. Derby: Breedon Books. ISBN 978-1-85983-010-9.
- Matthews, Tony (2010). Birmingham City: The Complete Record. Derby: Derby Books. ISBN 978-1-85983-853-2.
