= Jimmy Dailey =

Scottish footballer (1927–2002)

Personal information
- Full name: James Dailey
- Date of birth: 8 September 1927
- Place of birth: Glenboig, Scotland
- Date of death: January 2002 (aged 74)
- Place of death: Weymouth, England
- Position: Centre forward

Youth career
- 1943–1945: Wolverhampton Wanderers

Senior career*
Years	Team	Apps	(Gls)
1945–1946	Third Lanark		
1946–1949	Sheffield Wednesday	37	(24)
1949–1952	Birmingham City	41	(14)
1952–1953	Exeter City	45	(13)
1953–1957	Workington	176	(74)
1957–1959	Rochdale	53	(25)
1959–1961	Weymouth	53	(41)
1961–19??	Bath City		
- Poole Town
- Bridport

Managerial career
- Portland United
- Dorchester Town
- * Club domestic league appearances and goals

James Dailey (8 September 1927 – January 2002) was a Scottish professional footballer who played as a centre forward.

== Biography ==
Dailey was born in Glenboig, Lanarkshire. He began his football career during the Second World War as an amateur with Wolverhampton Wanderers. After the war he returned home and signed for Third Lanark. When he arrived at Sheffield Wednesday from Scotland as an 18-year-old, the team were struggling. He scored seven goals in his first eight games to start their recovery. At the start of the following season he scored ten in seven weeks, including all five in a 5–2 defeat of Barnsley, but the club preferred Eddie Quigley and Clarrie Jordan.

Dailey moved to Birmingham City for a not inconsiderable fee of £10,000 in February 1949. The next season, 1949–50, he was top scorer with nine goals in 23 games for a poor side which finished at the bottom of the table, but after that he rarely played.

After leaving Birmingham he went on to score freely in the lower divisions, notably with 74 goals in 176 League games for Workington, including a club all-time record 26 in 1956–57. At Rochdale he scored a goal every other game, which contributed to the club being placed in the Third Division on goal average when the Football League was reorganised in 1958.

Dailey later played non-League football in the south-west of England and managed Portland United and Dorchester Town. After leaving football he ran a sports shop in Weymouth. He retired to Spain but returned in 2001 due to ill health, and died in Weymouth in January 2002, at the age of 74.

== Honours ==
- with Birmingham City
  - Club's top scorer (9) 1950
- with Workington
  - Club's top scorer (26) 1957
- with Weymouth
  - Club's top scorer (31) 1959

== Notes and references ==
- Matthews, Tony (1995). Birmingham City: A Complete Record. Breedon Books. ISBN 1-85983-010-2.
- "Neil Brown's statistics site".
