= Jack Badham =

English footballer

Personal information
- Full name: John Badham
- Date of birth: 31 January 1919
- Place of birth: Birmingham, England
- Date of death: 1 January 1992 (aged 72)
- Place of death: Birmingham, England
- Positions: Full back; left half

Youth career
- 1934–19??: Birmingham

Senior career*
Years	Team	Apps	(Gls)
1946–1957	Birmingham City	175	(4)
1957–19??	Stourbridge		
1960–1962	Moorlands Athletic		

Managerial career
- 1962–19??: Moor Green
- * Club domestic league appearances and goals

John "Jack" Badham (31 January 1919 – 1 January 1992) was an English professional footballer who played as a full back or left half. He played 175 games in the Football League for Birmingham City in the top two divisions.

== Biography ==
Badham was born in Birmingham and he died in Birmingham aged 72.

=== Career ===
He began his football career as an amateur with Birmingham (later renamed Birmingham City) in 1934 but his career was seriously disrupted by the Second World War. He turned professional in 1946 after his Army service. He helped the club win the Second Division championship in 1947–48 and 1954–55. He played in the semifinal of the 1955–56 FA Cup in place of the injured Roy Warhurst, but Johnny Newman was preferred for the final. He was an adaptable, two-footed player, whose position of choice was full-back but who was used in a variety of positions by the club. He had a spell at Stourbridge before returning to Birmingham on the coaching staff, later becoming manager of Moor Green.

==== Honours ====
Birmingham City

- Football League Second Division champions: 1947–48, 1954–55
