= Jim Higgins (footballer) =

Irish footballer (born 1926)

James T. Higgins (born 3 February 1926) is an Irish former professional footballer who played as a centre forward. He was born in Dublin and played with Home Farm, and then for Dundalk in the League of Ireland, before transferring to Birmingham City in England in 1949. In a four-year spell at Birmingham he played 50 league games and scored 12 goals before returning to play with Dundalk again in 1953.

Higgins played just once for the Republic of Ireland national football team, appearing in a 1–0 friendly defeat to Argentina in Dalymount Park on 13 May 1951.
