= Roy Warhurst =

English footballer

Personal information
- Full name: Roy Warhurst
- Date of birth: 18 September 1926
- Place of birth: Sheffield, England
- Date of death: 7 January 2014 (aged 87)
- Place of death: Birmingham, England
- Position: Wing half

Youth career
- 1942-1943: Atlas & Norfolk Works
- 1943–1944: Huddersfield Town
- 1944: Sheffield United

Senior career*
Years	Team	Apps	(Gls)
1944–1950	Sheffield United	17	(2)
1950–1957	Birmingham City	213	(10)
1957–1959	Manchester City	40	(2)
1959–1960	Crewe Alexandra	51	(1)
1960–1961	Oldham Athletic	8	(0)
1961–1964	Banbury Spencer		
Total		329	(15)
- * Club domestic league appearances and goals

Roy Warhurst (18 September 1926 – 7 January 2014) was an English footballer who made more than 300 appearances in the Football League playing for Sheffield United, Birmingham City, Manchester City, Crewe Alexandra and Oldham Athletic. He played as a wing half.

Warhurst was born in Handsworth, Sheffield. He began his football career during the Second World War as a youth with Atlas & Norfolk Works before signing as an amateur with Huddersfield Town and Sheffield United, and turned professional with the latter in September 1944. His early career was as a winger, but after he joined Birmingham City for an £8,000 fee in 1950, he was converted to wing half. His forceful style contributed much to the club's Second Division title in the 1954–55 season and to their performances in the First Division and the FA Cup the following season. Warhurst injured a thigh in the sixth-round FA Cup match, and missed the rest of the season, and his absence was considered a significant factor in Birmingham's losing the 1956 Cup Final: teammate Alex Govan was convinced that "if Roy Warhurst had been fit then there would only have been one winner".

He succeeded Len Boyd as Birmingham captain at the end of that season, and 12 months later signed for Manchester City for a £10,000 fee. He spent 18 months at City before moving on to Crewe Alexandra and then to Oldham Athletic, where he was appointed captain. A spell in non-league football with Banbury Spencer preceded his retirement from the game in 1964.

Warhurst went on to become a scrap metal dealer. He was married to Jean and had three children. He died in January 2014 at the age of 87.

== Career statistics ==
Appearances and goals by club, season and competition
Club	Season	League			FA Cup		Other		Total	
Club	Season	Division	Apps	Goals	Apps	Goals	Apps	Goals	Apps	Goals
Sheffield United	1946–47	First Division	2	0	0	0	—		2	0
Sheffield United	1947–48	First Division	0	0	0	0	—		0	0
Sheffield United	1948–49	First Division	6	1	2	1	—		8	2
Sheffield United	1949–50	Second Division	9	1	2	0	—		11	1
Sheffield United	Total		17	2	4	1	—		21	3
Birmingham City	1949–50	First Division	3	0	—		—		3	0
Birmingham City	1950–51	Second Division	9	2	0	0	—		9	2
Birmingham City	1951–52	Second Division	36	1	2	0	—		38	1
Birmingham City	1952–53	Second Division	31	1	6	0	—		37	1
Birmingham City	1953–54	Second Division	37	0	1	0	—		38	0
Birmingham City	1954–55	Second Division	34	4	3	0	—		37	4
Birmingham City	1955–56	First Division	30	2	4	0	1 (Note: Appearance(s) in Inter-Cities Fairs Cup)	0	35	2
Birmingham City	1956–57	First Division	33	0	7	0	2	0	42	0
Birmingham City	Total		213	10	23	0	3	0	239	10
Manchester City	1957–58	First Division	37	2	1	0	—		38	2
Manchester City	1958–59	First Division	3	0	0	0	—		3	0
Manchester City	Total		40	2	1	0	—		41	2
Crewe Alexandra	1958–59	Fourth Division	9	0	—		—		9	0
Crewe Alexandra	1959–60	Fourth Division	42	1	4	0	—		46	1
Crewe Alexandra	Total		51	1	4	0	—		55	1
Oldham Athletic	1960–61	Second Division	8	0	0	0	0	0	8	0
Career total			329	15	32	1	3	0	364	16

== Honours ==
Birmingham City

- Football League Second Division: 1954–55
- FA Cup runner-up: 1955–56

== Sources ==
- Crisp, Marco (1998). Crewe Alexandra Match by Match. Nottingham: Tony Brown. ISBN 978-1-899468-81-2.
- Dykes, Garth (1988). Oldham Athletic: A Complete Record 1899–1988. Derby: Breedon Books. ISBN 978-0-907969-36-5.
- Goble, Ray; Ward, Andrew (1993). Manchester City A Complete Record. Derby: Breedon Books. ISBN 978-1-873626-41-2.
- Matthews, Tony (2010). Birmingham City: The Complete Record. Derby: Derby Books. ISBN 978-1-85983-853-2.
