= Johnny Newman (footballer) =

English football player and manager (1933–2025)

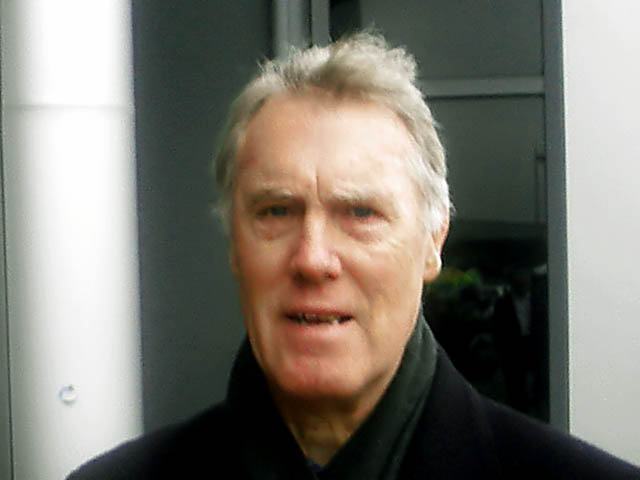

Personal information
- Full name: John Henry George Newman
- Date of birth: 13 December 1933
- Place of birth: Hereford, Herefordshire, England
- Date of death: November 2025 (aged 91)
- Position: Central defender

Senior career*
Years	Team	Apps	(Gls)
1951–1957	Birmingham City	60	(0)
1957–1960	Leicester City	61	(2)
1960–1967	Plymouth Argyle	298	(9)
1967–1972	Exeter City	92	(1)
Total		511	(12)

Managerial career
- 1969–1976: Exeter City
- 1976–1979: Grimsby Town
- 1982: Derby County
- 1983–1987: Hereford United
- * Club domestic league appearances and goals

John Henry George Newman (13 December 1933 – 25 November 2025) was an English football player and manager.

== Career ==
Born in Hereford, Herefordshire, Newman played as a central defender, beginning his career with Birmingham City in 1951 where he won the Second Division and was on the losing side in the 1956 FA Cup final. He moved on to Leicester City and then to Plymouth Argyle, for whom he made over 300 appearances between 1960 and 1967.

In 1966, Newman played for the Football League representative team which beat the Irish Football League 12–0 at Home Park; the Football League team contained seven of the 1966 World Cup-winning team. He then moved on to Devon rivals Exeter City, where he was made player-manager in 1969, continuing in the manager's role after he retired from playing in 1972. He moved on to Grimsby Town, gaining promotion to the Third Division, and had a largely unsuccessful eleven months in charge at Derby County, before returning to his home town to manage Hereford United. His coaching career included a spell as assistant manager to Bobby Saxton at York City.

Newman was the last surviving player from the Birmingham City squad that played in the 1956 FA Cup final.

== Death ==
Newman died in November 2025, at the age of 91.

== Managerial statistics ==
As of 25 April 2015

Team	From	To	Record				
Team	From	To	G	W	D	L	Win %
Exeter City	1 April 1969	21 December 1976	377	138	98	141	36.60
Grimsby Town	21 December 1976	11 July 1979	137	60	30	47	43.80
Derby County	25 January 1982	7 November 1982	38	6	13	19	15.79
Hereford United	1 March 1983	2 October 1987	231	83	58	90	35.93
Total			783	287	199	297	36.65

== Honours ==
Birmingham City

- FA Cup runner-up: 1955–56
