= Gil Merrick =

English footballer

Personal information
- Full name: Gilbert Harold Merrick
- Date of birth: 26 January 1922
- Place of birth: Sparkhill, Birmingham, England
- Date of death: 3 February 2010 (aged 88)
- Place of death: Birmingham, England
- Position: Goalkeeper

Youth career
- 1938–1939: Birmingham

Senior career*
Years	Team	Apps	(Gls)
1939–1960	Birmingham City	485	(0)

International career
1951–1954	England	23	(0)

Managerial career
- 1960–1964: Birmingham City
- 1967–1970: Bromsgrove Rovers
- 1970–1973: Atherstone Town
- * Club domestic league appearances and goals

Gilbert Harold Merrick (26 January 1922 – 3 February 2010) was an English footballer and football manager. Considered one of the best goalkeepers in the UK during the mid-1950s, Merrick was one in a long line of great Birmingham City keepers which included the likes of Johnny Schofield and Harry Hibbs. Merrick spent his entire career at Birmingham City, playing more than 700 times between 1939 and 1960. He made 170 appearances during the Second World War and 485 in the Football League following the end of the war. He won 23 caps for the England national team, and played in the 1954 World Cup. After retirement as a player, he managed the club for four years.

Birmingham City renamed the Railway Stand at their St Andrew's stadium the Gil Merrick Stand for the start of the 2009–10 season.

== Domestic career ==
Merrick was born in Sparkhill, Birmingham. He signed professional terms with Birmingham in August 1939, and remained with the team until his retirement as a player in 1960. At first, Merrick was third-choice goalkeeper behind boyhood hero Harry Hibbs and Jack Wheeler. This meant that Merrick had to wait until 20 May 1940 to make his debut in the Birmingham first team, then playing in the Midland Regional League because of the Second World War. With the retirement of Hibbs, Merrick gained the chance to play more competitive football, and by the end of the war he had amassed 170 appearances for the "Blues", including an FA Cup semi-final against Derby County, which Derby won 4–0 after a replay.

When the Football League resumed in 1946, Merrick found himself playing regularly for the recently renamed Birmingham City. In 1948, Merrick helped the club win the Second Division Two, missing only six games along the way. He played regularly for the Blues until the end of the 1954–55 season, when another Blues prodigy, Johnny Schofield replaced him in goal because of injury. During this time, Merrick achieved 126 league games in a row, from 15 April 1949 to 5 April 1952. He also played in every FA Cup game during this time, another nine games, including an FA Cup semi-final appearance against Blackpool, which the Blues lost 2–1.

By the 1955–56 season, Merrick had once again firmly established himself in the Birmingham City goal, as the Blues produced their best ever season, finishing sixth in the First Division and reaching the 1956 FA Cup Final, which they lost to Manchester City. Merrick was also the keeper when Birmingham reached the FA Cup semi-final the following year, only to be knocked out by Manchester United.

Merrick also played in the 1955–58 Inter-Cities Fairs Cup, in which Birmingham were knocked out at the semi-final stage by Barcelona, losing 2–1 in a replay at the St. Jakob Stadium in Basel. He also played some part in the 1958–60 tournament, but had lost his place in the Birmingham team to Schofield when Birmingham lost to Barcelona in the final.

After only playing one game in the 1959–60 season, Merrick retired to become manager of the team he had served loyally for more than 20 years.

== International career ==
Merrick was capped 23 times by England. He made his debut against Ireland on 14 November 1951 at Wembley in the 1952 British Home Championship. He was first-choice goalkeeper for England in the 1954 World Cup, his last international appearance coming against Uruguay on 26 June 1954, as England were eliminated at the quarter-final stage. All of Merrick's caps were gained when Birmingham City were a Second Division club. He is perhaps best known for being the last line of defence against the Hungary side of Ferenc Puskás and Nándor Hidegkuti, the "Magnificent Magyars" who beat England 6–3 at Wembley in 1953 and 7–1 at the Nepstadion in 1954.

The following is a complete list of Merrick's England appearances.

England score given first.

Cap	Date	Opponents	Score	Competition	Venue
1	14 November 1951	Ireland	2–0	1952 Home Championship	Villa Park, Birmingham
2	28 November 1951	Austria	2–2	Friendly	Wembley, London
3	5 April 1952	Scotland	2–1	1952 Home Championship	Hampden Park, Glasgow
4	18 May 1952	Italy	1–1	Friendly	Comunale, Florence
5	25 May 1952	Austria	3–2	Friendly	Prater, Vienna
6	28 May 1952	Switzerland	3–0	Friendly	Hardturm, Zurich
7	4 October 1952	Ireland	2–2	1953 Home Championship	Windsor Park, Belfast
8	12 November 1952	Wales	5–2	1953 Home Championship	Wembley, London
9	26 November 1952	Belgium	5–0	Friendly	Wembley, London
10	18 April 1953	Scotland	2–2	1953 Home Championship	Wembley, London
11	17 May 1953	Argentina	0–0	Friendly	Monumental, Buenos Aires
12	24 May 1953	Chile	2–1	Friendly	Nacional, Santiago
13	31 May 1953	Uruguay	1–2	Friendly	Centenario, Montevideo
14	10 October 1953	Wales	4–1	1954 Home Championship	Ninian Park, Cardiff
15	21 October 1953	FIFA XI	4–4	Friendly	Wembley, London
16	11 November 1953	Ireland	3–1	1954 Home Championship	Goodison Park, Liverpool
17	25 November 1953	Hungary	3–6	Friendly	Wembley, London
18	3 April 1954	Scotland	4–2	1954 Home Championship	Hampden Park, Glasgow
19	16 May 1954	Yugoslavia	0–1	Friendly	JNA, Belgrade
20	23 May 1954	Hungary	1–7	Friendly	Nepstadion, Budapest
21	17 June 1954	Belgium	4–4	1954 World Cup	St Jakob, Basel
22	20 June 1954	Switzerland	2–0	1954 World Cup	Wankdorf, Bern
23	26 June 1954	Uruguay	2–4	1954 World Cup	St Jakob, Basel

== Managerial career ==
After his retirement, Merrick took over from Pat Beasley as manager of Birmingham City in May 1960. Merrick's first competitive game in charge was a 2–2 draw away at Bolton Wanderers on 20 August 1960, and his first home game was against Sheffield Wednesday where his side drew 1–1. His side would go on to finish 19th in Division One. The Blues had another good run in the Inter-Cities Fairs Cup, reaching the final where they lost to Roma. The 1960-61 tournament did produce a win for Birmingham at the San Siro against Internazionale in the semi-final; they were the only English team to achieve this for around 40 years.

Although Merrick spent well in the transfer market, bringing in such players as Jimmy Harris and Welshman Ken Leek, Blues failed to make much impact on the First Division, and finished 17th in the 1961–62 season. Blues once again entered the Inter-Cities Fairs Cup, but went out in the second round to Espanyol.

By far the best achievement in Merrick's reign at the club came in the 1962–63 season, when he successfully led the Blues to the League Cup title, beating Aston Villa in the final thanks to goals from Ken Leek (2) and Jimmy Bloomfield. Birmingham finished 20th in the First Division. At the end of the 1963–64 season, in which Birmingham City again failed to make much impact in the league and finished 20th, the club requested Merrick's resignation.

Merrick had two more spells in management, with non-league Bromsgrove Rovers and Atherstone Town.

Team	From	To	Record				
Team	From	To	G	W	L	D	Win %
Birmingham City	May 1960	June 1964	202	64	46	92	31.7
Bromsgrove Rovers	1967	Unknown	–	–	–	–	–
Atherstone Town	1970	Unknown	–	–	–	–	–

== Honours ==
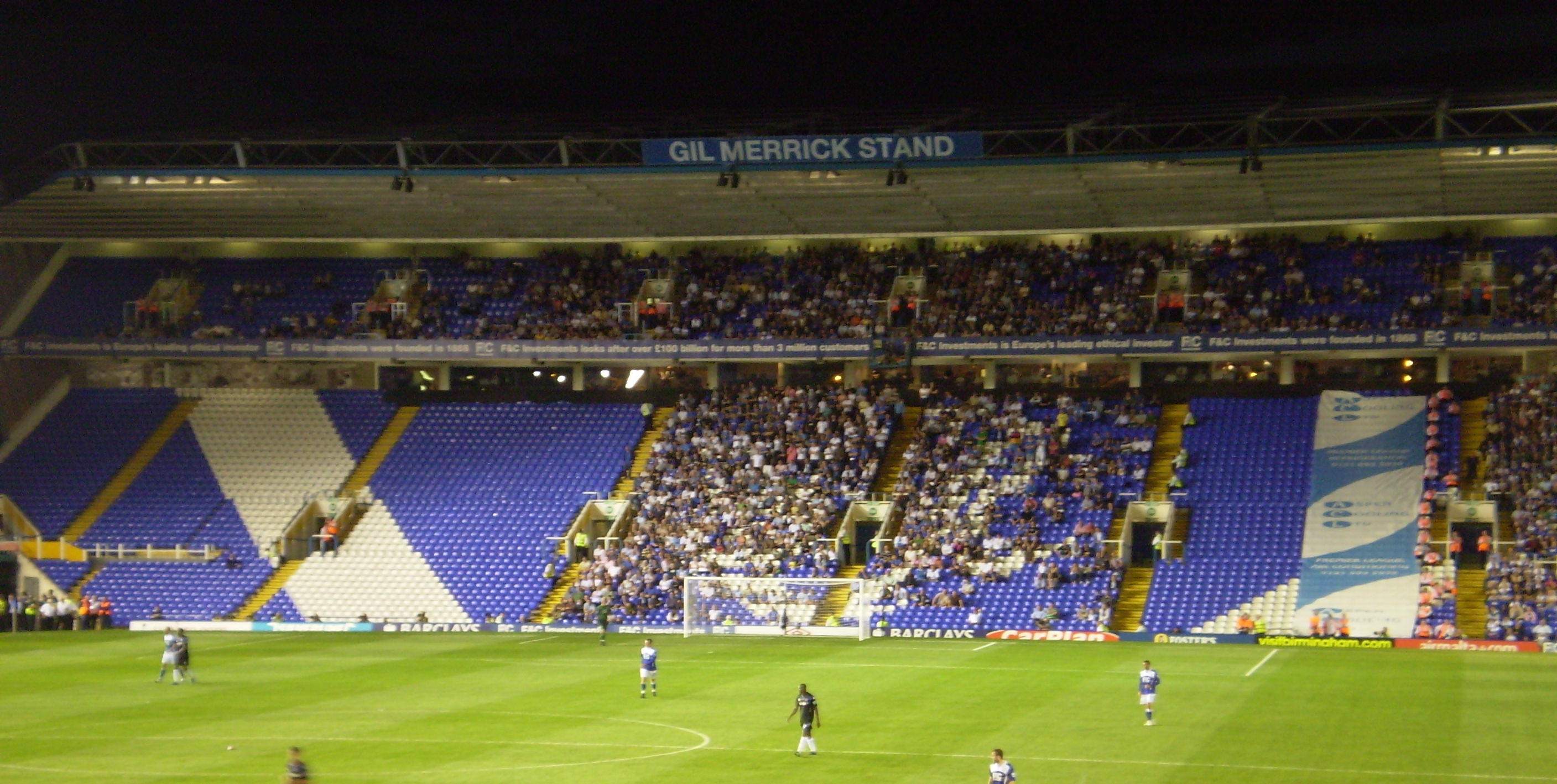
The Gil Merrick Stand, St Andrew's, August 2009

=== As a player ===
Birmingham City

- Football League South war league: 1945–46
- Football League Second Division: 1947–48, 1954–55
- FA Cup runner-up: 1955–56

=== As a manager ===
Birmingham City

- Football League Cup: 1962–63
- Inter-Cities Fairs Cup runner-up: 1960–61

Personal

- In April 2009, Birmingham City F.C. announced their intention of renaming one of the stands at their St Andrew's stadium in Merrick's honour. From the 2009–10 season, the Railway Stand would be known as the Gil Merrick Stand.
- In August 2009, Merrick was chosen by public vote as Birmingham City's representative on the Birmingham Walk of Stars.
- In October 2009, Merrick was the first inductee to the Birmingham City F.C. Hall of Fame.
