= Bob Brocklebank =

English footballer (1908–1981)

Personal information
- Date of birth: 23 May 1908
- Place of birth: Finchley, London, England
- Date of death: September 1981 (aged 73)
- Place of death: Brixham, England
- Height: 6 ft 0 in (1.83 m)
- Position: Inside right

Senior career*
Years	Team	Apps	(Gls)
192?–1929	Finchley		
1929–1936	Aston Villa	19	(2)
1936–1939	Burnley	121	(33)

Managerial career
- 1945–1949: Chesterfield
- 1949–1954: Birmingham City
- 1955–1961: Hull City
- 1961–1964: Bradford City
- * Club domestic league appearances and goals

Bob Brocklebank (23 May 1908 – September 1981) was an English football player and manager. He played for Aston Villa and Burnley, for whom he was top scorer in the 1937–38 season, before becoming a manager. He took charge of Chesterfield, Birmingham City, Hull City and Bradford City.

== Playing career ==
Brocklebank was born in Finchley, England as one of eight brothers. He started his football career as an amateur with his hometown team Finchley, in the London League. In May 1929 he signed for Aston Villa. His chances were limited at Villa Park, and he signed for Burnley during the 1935–36 season where he developed into an inside right earning the nickname The Toff because of his gentlemanly approach to life and football.

Brocklebank made 121 League appearances for Burnley, scoring 33 goals. During the 1937–38 he was the club's top goalscorer with 14 goals. He continued to play at Burnley throughout the Second World War.

== Managerial career ==
Brocklebank became Chesterfield manager in September 1945. He established the club in Division Two before he joined Birmingham City in February 1949. The club was relegated in 1949–50 to Division Two. Brocklebank began to rebuild the side but resigned in 1954 just six months before they were promoted back to the top flight.

He worked as a scout for West Bromwich Albion from October 1954 to March 1955 until he was appointed manager at Hull City. He again suffered relegation in his first full season as Hull finished bottom of Division Two in 1955–56. He took Hull back up three years later from the newly formed Division Three. Hull were relegated the following season. Brocklebank resigned in May 1961 because he was frustrated at being unable to guide them straight back up.

Instead he joined Bradford City to take over from Peter Jackson as manager. His reign at Valley Parade was topsy-turvy. He guided the club to fifth-place finishes in 1961–62 and 1963–64 but City had had to apply for re-election in the season between the promotion pushes. The club's directors extended Brocklebank's contract in July 1964 for another two years, but three months later, disillusioned by a poor start, Brocklebank resigned.

== Death ==
He retired to Brixham where he died in September 1981, aged 73.
