= 1948–49 Birmingham City F.C. season =

Birmingham City F.C.
1948–49 season
- Chairman: Harry Morris Jr
- Manager: Harry Storer until November 1948; Walter Taylor caretaker manager Bob Brocklebank from January 1949
- Ground: St Andrew's
- Football League First Division: 17th
- FA Cup: Third round (eliminated by Leicester City)
- Top goalscorer: League: Jackie Stewart (11); All: Jackie Stewart (11)
- Highest home attendance: 52,129 vs Derby County, 30 October 1948
- Lowest home attendance: 20,730 vs Bolton Wanderers, 5 March 1949
- Average home league attendance: 38,453
Home colours

The 1948–49 Football League season was Birmingham City Football Club's 46th in the Football League and their 27th in the First Division, having been promoted as Second Division champions in 1947–48. They finished in 17th position in the 22-team division, having both scored fewer and conceded fewer goals than any other team in the division. They entered the 1948–49 FA Cup at the third round proper and lost to Leicester City in that round after two replays.

In November 1948, Harry Storer resigned as team manager. The club's chief scout, Walter Taylor, was appointed as assistant team manager shortly afterwards and acted as caretaker manager until Bob Brocklebank's appointment in January 1949.

Thirty-one players made at least one appearance in nationally organised competition, and there were twelve different goalscorers. Full-back Ken Green missed only one game of the 45-game season, and Jackie Stewart was leading goalscorer with eleven goals, all scored in the league.

== Football League First Division ==
Date	League position	Opponents	Venue	Result	Score F–A	Scorers	Attendance
22 August 1948	7th	Wolverhampton Wanderers	A	D	2–2	Bodle, Trigg	54,361
25 August 1948	10th	Middlesbrough	H	D	0–0		37,864
28 August 1948	5th	Chelsea	H	W	1–0	Stewart	48,264
1 September 1948	6th	Middlesbrough	A	D	1–1	Garrett	34,016
4 September 1948	4th	Everton	A	W	5–0	Trigg 2, Stewart 2, Garrett	49,199
8 September 1948	6th	Manchester City	A	L	0–1		29,956
11 September 1948	3rd	Preston North End	H	W	1–0	Garrett	43,499
15 September 1948	3rd	Manchester City	H	W	4–1	Stewart 4	35,593
18 September 1948	3rd	Burnley	A	D	2–2	Trigg, Bodle	34,081
25 September 1948	3rd	Stoke City	H	W	2–1	Harris, Dougall	48,896
2 October 1948	3rd	Charlton Athletic	A	D	1–1	Garrett	56,294
9 October 1948	3rd	Bolton Wanderers	A	D	0–0		45,494
16 October 1948	4th	Liverpool	H	L	0–1		42,331
23 October 1948	7th	Blackpool	A	L	0–1		25,126
30 October 1948	9th	Derby County	H	L	0–1		52,129
6 November 1948	12th	Arsenal	A	L	0–2		61,571
13 November 1948	9th	Huddersfield Town	H	W	1–0	Hepplewhite og	35,207
20 November 1948	12th	Manchester United	A	L	0–3		48,325
27 November 1948	14th	Sheffield United	H	L	1–2	Hall	32,857
4 December 1948	14th	Aston Villa	A	W	3–0	Stewart 2, Bodle	62,424
11 December 1948	12th	Sunderland	H	D	0–0		28,249
18 December 1948	12th	Wolverhampton Wanderers	H	L	0–1		39,657
25 December 1948	2nd	Newcastle United	H	W	2–0	Trigg, Roberts	42,111
27 December 1948	12th	Newcastle United	A	L	0–1		49,457
1 January 1949	14th	Chelsea	A	L	0–2		28,850
22 January 1949	15th	Preston North End	A	D	0–0		31,894
5 February 1949	14th	Burnley	H	D	0–0		34,003
12 February 1949	14th	Everton	H	D	0–0		35,098
19 February 1949	15th	Stoke City	A	L	1–2	Harris	25,975
26 February 1949	13th	Charlton Athletic	H	W	1–0	Stewart	35,502
5 March 1949	11th	Bolton Wanderers	H	D	0–0		20,730
12 March 1949	13th	Liverpool	A	L	0–1		43,753
19 March 1949	12th	Manchester United	H	W	1–0	Boyd	46,819
26 March 1949	14th	Sheffield United	A	L	0–4		25,761
2 April 1949	13th	Arsenal	H	D	1–1	Jordan	38,868
9 April 1949	14th	Huddersfield Town	A	D	0–0		18,856
15 April 1949	14th	Portsmouth	A	L	1–3	Dorman	38,456
16 April 1949	15th	Blackpool	H	D	1–1	Jordan	34,726
18 April 1949	11th	Portsmouth	H	W	3–0	Badham, Stewart, Hindmarsh og	29,983
23 April 1949	16th	Derby County	A	L	0–1		25,548
30 April 1949	16th	Aston Villa	H	L	0–1		45,120
7 May 1949	17th	Sunderland	A	D	1–1	Roberts	28,007

=== League table (part) ===
Final First Division table (part)
Pos	Club	Pld	W	D	L	F	A	GA	Pts
15th	Burnley	42	12	14	16	43	50	0.86	38
16th	Blackpool	42	11	16	15	54	67	0.81	38
17th	Birmingham City	42	11	15	16	36	38	0.95	37
18th	Everton	42	13	11	18	41	63	0.65	37
19th	Middlesbrough	42	11	12	19	46	57	0.81	34
Key	Pos = League position; Pld = Matches played; W = Matches won; D = Matches drawn; L = Matches lost; F = Goals for; A = Goals against; GA = Goal average; Pts = Points								
Source									

== FA Cup ==
Round	Date	Opponents	Venue	Result	Score F–A	Scorers	Attendance
Third round	8 January 1949	Leicester City	H	D	1–1	Roberts	41,292
Third round replay	15 January 1949	Leicester City	A	D	1–1 aet	Bodle	35,367
Third round 2nd replay	17 January 1949	Leicester City	H	L	1–2	Dorman	31,609

== Appearances and goals ==
Players marked † left the club during the playing season.
Key to positions: GK – Goalkeeper; FB – Full back; HB – Half back; FW – Forward

Players' appearances and goals by competition
Pos.	Nat.	Name	League		FA Cup		Total	
Pos.	Nat.	Name	Apps	Goals	Apps	Goals	Apps	Goals
GK	ENG	Gil Merrick	41	0	2	0	43	0
GK	ENG	Bill Robertson	1	0	1	0	2	0
FB	ENG	Ken Green	41	0	3	0	44	0
FB	ENG	Dennis Jennings	30	0	0	0	30	0
FB	ENG	Wally Quinton †	0	0	1	0	1	0
FB	ENG	Jack Southam	0	0	2	0	2	0
HB	ENG	Jack Badham	18	1	1	0	19	1
HB	ENG	Len Boyd	9	1	0	0	9	1
HB	ENG	Ted Duckhouse	39	0	3	0	42	0
HB	NIR	Ray Ferris	11	0	0	0	11	0
HB	ENG	Fred Harris	36	2	3	0	39	2
HB	ENG	Martin McDonnell	9	0	0	0	9	0
HB	SCO	Frank McKee	11	0	2	0	13	0
HB	ENG	Frank Mitchell †	11	0	0	0	11	0
FW	ENG	Johnny Berry	16	0	3	0	19	0
FW	ENG	Harold Bodle †	18	3	2	1	20	4
FW	SCO	Jimmy Dailey	7	0	0	0	7	0
FW	ENG	Don Dorman	10	1	2	1	12	2
FW	SCO	Neil Dougall †	24	1	1	0	25	5
FW	WAL	George Edwards †	8	0	0	0	8	0
FW	WAL	Hugh Evans	2	0	2	0	4	0
FW	SCO	Archie Garrett †	11	4	0	0	11	4
FW	ENG	Jackie Goodwin †	1	0	0	0	1	0
FW	ENG	Fred Hall	2	1	0	0	2	1
FW	ENG	John Hughes	3	0	0	0	3	0
FW	ENG	Johnny Jordan	9	2	0	0	9	2
FW	SCO	Bobby Laing	14	0	0	0	14	0
FW	ENG	Harold Roberts	17	2	3	1	20	3
FW	ENG	Fred Slater	3	0	0	0	3	0
FW	SCO	Jackie Stewart	37	11	0	0	37	11
FW	ENG	Cyril Trigg	23	5	2	0	25	5

== See also ==
- Birmingham City F.C. seasons
