= 1947–48 Birmingham City F.C. season =

Birmingham City F.C.
1947–48 season
- Chairman: Harry Morris Jr
- Manager: Harry Storer
- Ground: St Andrew's
- Football League Second Division: 1st (promoted)
- FA Cup: Third round (eliminated by Notts County)
- Top goalscorer: League: Harold Bodle (14); All: Harold Bodle (14)
- Highest home attendance: 53,327 vs Notts County, FA Cup 3rd round, 10 January 1948
- Lowest home attendance: 29,020 vs Bradford Park Avenue, 22 November 1947
- Average home league attendance: 38,365
Home colours

The 1947–48 Football League season was Birmingham City Football Club's 45th in the Football League and their 19th in the Second Division. They reached first place in the 22-team division after the match played on 6 December and retained that position for the remainder of the season, winning the Second Division title for the third time and gaining promotion to the First Division for 1948–49, from which they had been relegated at the end of the last completed pre-war season. They entered the 1947–48 FA Cup at the third round proper and lost to Notts County in that round.

Twenty-four players made at least one appearance in nationally organised competition, and there were twelve different goalscorers. Forward Frank Mitchell missed only one of the 43 games over the season, and Harold Bodle was leading scorer with 14 goals, all of which came in the league.

== Football League Second Division ==
Date	League position	Opponents	Venue	Result	Score F–A	Scorers	Attendance
23 August 1947	14th	Barnsley	H	L	2–3	Bodle, Mitchell pen	37,917
25 August 1947	11th	Coventry City	A	W	1–0	Aveyard	30,558
30 August 1947	7th	Plymouth Argyle	A	W	3–0	Dougall, Bodle, Aveyard	24,178
3 September 1947	7th	Coventry City	H	D	1–1	Bodle	36,545
6 September 1947	3rd	Luton Town	H	W	2–1	Bodle, Aveyard	40,032
10 September 1947	5th	Newcastle United	H	D	0–0		35,368
13 September 1947	3rd	Brentford	A	W	2–1	Trigg, Edwards	25,523
17 September 1947	5th	Newcastle United	A	L	0–1		51,704
20 September 1947	4th	Leicester City	H	W	1–0	Dougall	36,495
27 September 1947	3rd	Leeds United	A	W	1–0	Trigg	37,135
4 October 1947	2nd	Fulham	H	W	3–1	Bodle 2, Trigg	39,758
11 October 1947	2nd	Chesterfield	H	D	0–0		37,918
18 October 1947	2nd	West Ham United	A	D	0–0		32,228
25 October 1947	2nd	Bury	H	W	2–0	Bodle, Dougall	34,806
1 November 1947	3rd	Southampton	A	L	0–2		27,243
8 November 1947	2nd	Doncaster Rovers	H	W	3–0	Goodwin 2, Bodle	31,052
15 November 1947	2nd	Nottingham Forest	A	W	2–0	McIntosh, Goodwin	33,364
22 November 1947	2nd	Bradford Park Avenue	H	W	4–3	Ottewell, Goodwin, Mitchell pen	29,020
29 November 1947	2nd	Cardiff City	A	L	0–2		39,646
6 December 1947	1st	Sheffield Wednesday	H	W	1–0	Westlake og	31,217
13 December 1947	1st	Tottenham Hotspur	A	W	2–1	Garrett, Dougall	52,730
20 December 1947	1st	Barnsley	A	W	1–0	Bodle	18,880
25 December 1947	1st	Millwall	A	D	0–0		25,794
27 December 1947	1st	Millwall	H	W	1–0	Goodwin	45,985
3 January 1948	1st	Plymouth Argyle	H	D	1–1	Goodwin	35,480
17 January 1948	1st	Luton Town	A	W	1–0	Bodle	19,697
31 January 1948	1st	Brentford	H	D	0–0		37,542
14 February 1948	1st	Leeds United	H	W	5–1	Laing 2, Stewart 2, Dorman	39,955
21 February 1948	1st	Fulham	A	D	1–1	Bodle	13,164
28 February 1948	1st	Chesterfield	A	W	3–0	Stewart, Dougall, Bodle	15,844
6 March 1948	1st	West Ham United	H	L	0–1		43,709
13 March 1948	1st	Bury	A	D	1–1	Edwards	23,420
20 March 1948	1st	Southampton	H	D	0–0		39,730
27 March 1948	1st	Doncaster Rovers	A	D	0–0		25,370
29 March 1948	1st	West Bromwich Albion	H	W	4–0	Stewart 2, Bodle, Trigg	47,074
30 March 1948	1st	West Bromwich Albion	A	D	1–1	Bodle	51,945
3 April 1948	1st	Nottingham Forest	H	W	2–1	Stewart, Mitchell pen	38,227
10 April 1948	1st	Bradford Park Avenue	A	W	2–1	Mitchell pen, Stewart	16,782
17 April 1948	1st	Cardiff City	H	W	2–0	Trigg, Bodle	52,276
19 April 1948	1st	Leicester City	A	D	0–0		31,937
24 April 1948	1st	Sheffield Wednesday	A	D	0–0		25,789
1 May 1948	1st	Tottenham Hotspur	H	D	0–0		35,569

=== League table (part) ===
Final Second Division table (part)
Pos	Club	Pld	W	D	L	F	A	GA	Pts
1st	Birmingham City	42	22	15	5	55	24	2.29	59
2nd	Newcastle United	42	24	8	10	72	41	1.76	56
3rd	Southampton	42	21	10	11	71	53	1.34	52
4th	Sheffield Wednesday	42	20	11	11	66	53	1.25	51
5th	Cardiff City	42	18	11	13	61	58	1.05	47
Key	Pos = League position; Pld = Matches played; W = Matches won; D = Matches drawn; L = Matches lost; F = Goals for; A = Goals against; GA = Goal average; Pts = Points								
Source									

== FA Cup ==
Round	Date	Opponents	Venue	Result	Score F–A	Scorers	Attendance
Third round	10 January 1948	Notts County	H	L	0–2		53,327

== Appearances and goals ==
Players marked † left the club during the playing season.
Key to positions: GK – Goalkeeper; FB – Full back; HB – Half back; FW – Forward

Players' appearances and goals by competition
Pos.	Nat.	Name	League		FA Cup		Total	
Pos.	Nat.	Name	Apps	Goals	Apps	Goals	Apps	Goals
GK	ENG	Gil Merrick	36	0	0	0	36	0
GK	ENG	Jack Wheeler	6	0	1	0	7	0
FB	ENG	Ken Green	35	0	1	0	36	0
FB	ENG	Dennis Jennings	29	0	1	0	30	0
FB	ENG	Wally Quinton	8	0	0	0	8	0
FB	ENG	Jack Southam	1	0	0	0	1	0
HB	ENG	Jack Badham	2	0	1	0	3	0
HB	ENG	Don Dorman	8	1	0	0	8	1
HB	ENG	Ted Duckhouse	36	0	1	0	37	0
HB	ENG	Fred Harris	40	0	1	0	41	0
HB	ENG	Martin McDonnell	13	0	0	0	13	0
HB	ENG	Frank Mitchell	41	4	1	0	42	4
FW	ENG	Walter Aveyard	7	3	0	0	7	3
FW	ENG	Johnny Berry	3	0	0	0	3	0
FW	ENG	Harold Bodle	39	14	0	0	39	14
FW	SCO	Neil Dougall	34	5	1	0	35	5
FW	WAL	George Edwards	37	2	1	0	38	2
FW	SCO	Archie Garrett	8	1	0	0	8	1
FW	ENG	Jackie Goodwin	16	6	1	0	17	6
FW	ENG	John Hughes	3	0	0	0	3	0
FW	SCO	Bobby Laing	4	2	0	0	4	2
FW	SCO	Alex McIntosh †	9	1	0	0	9	1
FW	ENG	Sid Ottewell †	5	2	0	0	5	2
FW	SCO	Jackie Stewart	17	7	0	0	17	7
FW	ENG	Cyril Trigg	25	6	1	0	26	6

== See also ==
- Birmingham City F.C. seasons
