= 1946–47 Birmingham City F.C. season =

Birmingham City F.C.
1946–47 season
- Chairman: Harry Morris Jr
- Manager: Harry Storer
- Ground: St Andrew's
- Football League Second Division: 3rd
- FA Cup: Sixth round (eliminated by Liverpool)
- Top goalscorer: League: Cyril Trigg (17); All: Cyril Trigg (19)
- Highest home attendance: 56,056 vs Manchester City, FA Cup 5th round, 8 February 1947
- Lowest home attendance: 23,083 vs Bradford Park Avenue, 3 May 1947
- Average home league attendance: 33,666
Home colours

The 1946–47 Football League season – the first Football League season after the end of the Second World War – was Birmingham City Football Club's 44th in the Football League and their 18th in the Second Division, to which they were relegated at the end of the last completed season before the war. They finished in third position in the 22-team division, three points adrift of the promotion places. They entered the 1946–47 FA Cup at the third round proper and lost to Liverpool in the sixth (quarter-final).

Twenty-five players made at least one appearance in nationally organised competition, and there were fourteen different goalscorers. Goalkeeper Gil Merrick missed only one of the 45 matches over the season, and Cyril Trigg was leading scorer with 19 goals, of which 17 came in the league.

== Football League Second Division ==
Note that not all teams completed their playing season on the same day. Birmingham were in second place after their last game of the season, on 26 May, but by the time the last game was played, on 14 June, Burnley had drawn one and won one of their two outstanding fixtures to overtake them by three points.

Date	League position	Opponents	Venue	Result	Score F–A	Scorers	Attendance
31 August 1946	5th	Tottenham Hotspur	A	W	2–1	Jones, Mulraney	51,256
4 September 1946	1st	Leicester City	H	W	4–0	Jones 2, Mulraney, Dougall	29,329
7 September 1946	4th	Burnley	H	L	0–2		42,309
12 September 1946	8th	Leicester City	A	L	1–2	Mulraney	20,952
14 September 1946	12th	Barnsley	A	L	1–3	Mulraney	28,219
18 September 1946	15th	West Bromwich Albion	A	L	0–3		30,186
21 September 1946	15th	Newport County	H	D	1–1	Bodle	28,832
25 September 1946	12th	West Bromwich Albion	H	W	1–0	Dearson	50,535
28 September 1946	14th	Southampton	A	L	0–1		24,921
5 October 1946	10th	Nottingham Forest	H	W	4–0	Bodle, Trigg, Edwards 2	35,093
12 October 1946	9th	Coventry City	A	D	0–0		29,379
19 October 1946	9th	Chesterfield	A	W	1–0	Jones	18,748
26 October 1946	9th	Millwall	H	W	4–0	Bodle, Trigg 2, Dougall	23,243
2 November 1946	9th	Bradford Park Avenue	A	L	0–2		21,638
9 November 1946	8th	Manchester City	H	W	3–1	Dougall, Mulraney, Trigg	37,747
16 November 1946	6th	West Ham United	A	W	4–0	Bodle, Edwards 2, Trigg	24,719
23 November 1946	6th	Sheffield Wednesday	H	W	3–1	Trigg 2, Dougall	32,425
30 November 1946	2nd	Fulham	A	W	1–0	Trigg	20,790
7 December 1946	2nd	Bury	H	W	3–0	Duckhouse, Dougall, Edwards	30,340
14 December 1946	2nd	Luton Town	A	W	3–1	Trigg 3	21,760
21 December 1946	2nd	Plymouth Argyle	H	W	6–1	Bodle 3, Mulraney 2, Edwards	26,734
25 December 1946	1st	Swansea Town	H	W	3–1	Dougall, Bodle, Feeney og	31,309
26 December 1946	1st	Swansea Town	A	L	0–1		20,003
28 December 1946	1st	Tottenham Hotspur	H	W	1–0	Mulraney	44,171
4 January 1947	3rd	Burnley	A	L	0–1		36,281
18 January 1947	4th	Barnsley	H	L	1–2	Duckhouse	41,409
1 February 1947	4th	Southampton	H	W	3–1	Trigg 2, Mulraney	32,878
15 February 1947	3rd	Coventry City	H	W	2–0	Trigg 2	43,551
22 February 1947	3rd	Chesterfield	H	D	0–0		26,139
15 March 1947	3rd	Manchester City	A	L	0–1		55,655
22 March 1947	3rd	West Ham United	H	W	3–0	McIntosh, Mitchell pen, Trigg	29,937
29 March 1947	3rd	Sheffield Wednesday	A	L	0–1		27,431
4 April 1947	3rd	Newcastle United	A	D	2–2	McIntosh, Bodle	57,259
5 April 1947	3rd	Fulham	H	W	2–1	Hall, Goodwin	28,194
7 April 1947	3rd	Newcastle United	H	W	2–0	Bodle, Trigg	42,409
12 April 1947	3rd	Bury	A	L	0–2		18,882
19 April 1947	3rd	Luton Town	H	W	1–0	Goodwin	27,316
26 April 1947	3rd	Plymouth Argyle	A	W	2–0	Edwards, Bodle	23,338
3 May 1947	3rd	Bradford Park Avenue	H	W	4–0	Dougall, Bodle 2, Mitchell pen	23,083
10 May 1947	3rd	Nottingham Forest	A	D	1–1	Harris	16,049
17 May 1947	2nd	Millwall	A	W	2–0	McIntosh, Dougall	24,084
26 May 1947	2nd	Newport County	A	W	3–0	Bodle 2, Dougall	12,028

=== League table (part) ===
Final Second Division table (part)
Pos	Club	Pld	W	D	L	F	A	GA	Pts
1st	Manchester City	42	26	10	6	78	35	2.23	62
2nd	Burnley	42	22	14	6	65	29	2.24	58
3rd	Birmingham City	42	25	5	12	74	33	2.24	55
4th	Chesterfield	42	18	14	10	58	44	1.32	50
5th	Newcastle United	42	19	10	13	95	63	1.53	48
Key	Pos = League position; Pld = Matches played; W = Matches won; D = Matches drawn; L = Matches lost; F = Goals for; A = Goals against; GA = Goal average; Pts = Points								
Source									

== FA Cup ==
Round	Date	Opponents	Venue	Result	Score F–A	Scorers	Attendance
Third round	11 January 1947	Fulham	A	W	2–1	Jones, Dorman	22,398
Fourth round	25 January 1947	Portsmouth	H	W	1–0	Harris	50,155
Fifth round	8 February 1947	Manchester City	H	W	5–0	Bodle, Trigg 2, Mitchell pen, Mulraney	56,056
Sixth round	1 March 1947	Liverpool	A	L	1–4	Mitchell pen	51,911

== Appearances and goals ==
Players marked † left the club during the playing season.
Key to positions: GK – Goalkeeper; FB – Full back; HB – Half back; FW – Forward

Players' appearances and goals by competition
Pos.	Nat.	Name	League		FA Cup		Total	
Pos.	Nat.	Name	Apps	Goals	Apps	Goals	Apps	Goals
GK	ENG	Gil Merrick	41	0	4	0	45	0
GK	ENG	Jack Wheeler	1	0	0	0	1	0
FB	WAL	Don Dearson †	25	1	2	0	28	1
FB	WAL	Billy Hughes	28	0	0	0	28	0
FB	ENG	Dennis Jennings	18	0	4	0	22	0
HB	ENG	Ray Devey	1	0	0	0	1	0
HB	ENG	Ted Duckhouse	25	2	4	0	29	2
HB	ENG	Fred Harris	29	1	4	1	33	2
HB	ENG	Frank Mitchell	41	2	2	2	43	4
HB	ENG	Syd Owen	5	0	0	0	5	0
HB	ENG	Ray Shaw	5	0	0	0	5	0
HB	ENG	Arthur Turner	27	0	4	0	31	0
FW	ENG	Harold Bodle	36	15	3	1	39	16
FW	ENG	Don Dorman	2	0	1	1	3	1
FW	SCO	Neil Dougall	35	9	3	0	38	9
FW	WAL	George Edwards	39	7	4	0	43	7
FW	ENG	Ken Faulkner	2	0	0	0	2	0
FW	ENG	Jackie Goodwin	15	2	0	0	15	2
FW	ENG	Fred Hall	3	1	0	0	3	1
FW	WAL	Wilson Jones	9	4	1	1	10	5
FW	SCO	Alex McIntosh	14	3	0	0	14	3
FW	ENG	Dave Massart	3	0	0	0	3	0
FW	SCO	Jock Mulraney	27	9	4	1	31	10
FW	ENG	Doug Pimbley	2	0	0	0	2	0
FW	ENG	Cyril Trigg	29	17	4	2	33	19

== See also ==
- Birmingham City F.C. seasons
