= 1945–46 Birmingham City F.C. season =

Birmingham City F.C.
1945–46 season
- Chairman: Harry Morris Jr
- Manager: Harry Storer
- Ground: St Andrew's
- Football League South: 1st
- FA Cup: Semi-final (eliminated by Derby County)
- Top goalscorer: League: Charlie Wilson Jones (20); All: Charlie Wilson Jones (25)
- Highest home attendance: FA Cup: 49,858 vs Bradford Park Avenue, 9 March 1946
- Lowest home attendance: FA Cup: 25,054 vs Watford, 29 March 1946
Home colours

The 1945–46 season was Birmingham City Football Club's first season played under that name in nationally-organised football. The club had been called Birmingham F.C. since 1905, and the City suffix was added in 1943. Although the Football League did not resume until the 1946–47 season, the FA Cup restarted in 1945. Birmingham reached the semi-final, in which they lost to Derby County after extra time in a replay, played at Maine Road, Manchester, in front of 80,407 spectators. In league competition, Birmingham were champions of the first and only edition of the Football League South, taking the title on goal average from local rivals Aston Villa.

Twenty-four players made at least one Football League South appearance, though only twelve appeared regularly, the remaining twelve making just 36 appearances between them. Full-back Dennis Jennings missed only one of the 42 matches over the season. Charlie Wilson Jones was the leading scorer with 20 goals in league competition. In the FA Cup, the same eleven players were selected for all the ties, apart from Sid King replacing Gil Merrick in goal for two of the ten matches.

== Football League South ==
The Football League North and South were set up as a precursor to the resumption of the Football League proper the following season. They included those teams playing in the First and Second Divisions in the 1939–40 Football League season abandoned when war broke out, divided on a regional basis. Because registration rules had not been strictly observed during the war, and with many players still away on military service, teams were permitted to field guest players.

On the last day of the season, Aston Villa had already completed their fixtures. Both Birmingham and Charlton Athletic were two points behind them with a game to play and a superior goal average. In the event, Birmingham won 3–0 away at Luton Town to finish level on points with Aston Villa with a better goal average. Charlton were 1–0 ahead of Wolverhampton Wanderers when they heard that Birmingham had scored twice, so they needed another goal to overhaul them on goal average. They went on an all-out attack, but Wanderers' Dicky Dorsett broke away to score, thus confirming Charlton in third place. According to the Birmingham Evening Despatch's "Argus Junior",

The best tribute that can be paid to Birmingham City F.C., League South champions and F.A. Cup semi-finalists, is that twelve players were mainly responsible for taking the club through to this much envied football distinction. ... But the fighting quality and team sprit, which had already carried them so far, gradually reasserted itself, and a grandstand finish, with as exciting a football race as has ever taken place, found City on top, worthy winners of the championship because of their consistency."

Date	Opponents	Venue	Result	Score F–A	Scorers
25 August 1945	West Ham United	H	L	0–1	
1 September 1945	West Ham United	A	L	2–3	Massart, Edwards
3 September 1945	Luton Town	H	W	3–2	Dougall, Bodle
8 September 1945	West Bromwich Albion	H	W	4–0	Edwards, Mulraney, Duckhouse, Jones
15 September 1945	West Bromwich Albion	A	D	0–0	
17 September 1945	Coventry City	A	W	3–2	Bodle, Duckhouse, Mulraney
22 September 1945	Swansea Town	A	W	4–2	Mulraney, Dougall, Massart 2
29 September 1945	Swansea Town	H	W	5–0	Bodle 2, Duckhouse, Jones, Mulraney
6 October 1945	Tottenham Hotspur	H	W	8–0	Duckhouse, Massart 2, Dougall, Bodle, Edwards, Mulraney 2
13 October 1945	Tottenham Hotspur	A	W	1–0	Mulraney
20 October 1945	Brentford	A	L	1–2	White
27 October 1945	Brentford	H	W	1–0	Massart
3 November 1945	Chelsea	H	W	5–2	Bodle 2, Jones, Turner pen, Edwards
10 November 1945	Chelsea	A	W	3–2	Jones 2, Turner pen
17 November 1945	Millwall	A	L	1–5	Jones
24 November 1945	Millwall	H	W	4–0	Bodle, Jones, Edwards 2
1 December 1945	Southampton	A	D	1–1	Duckhouse
8 December 1945	Southampton	H	W	4–0	Bodle 2, Duckhouse, Edwards
15 December 1945	Derby County	A	W	2–0	Edwards, Jones
22 December 1945	Derby County	H	W	1–0	Bodle
25 December 1945	Leicester City	H	W	6–2	Jones 2, Dougall, Bodle, Edwards, Mulraney
26 December 1945	Leicester City	A	W	1–0	Mulraney
29 December 1945	Coventry City	H	W	2–0	Edwards, Dougall
12 January 1946	Aston Villa	A	D	2–2	Dearson, Dougall
19 January 1946	Aston Villa	H	W	3–1	Jones 2, Mulraney
2 February 1946	Arsenal	A	W	3–0	Jones, Edwards 2
16 February 1946	Charlton Athletic	H	W	1–0	Jones
23 February 1946	Fulham	H	W	2–0	Laing, White
13 March 1946	Arsenal	H	L	0–1	
16 March 1946	Plymouth Argyle	H	L	0–1	
30 March 1946	Portsmouth	A	W	4–3	Mulraney, Jones, Dougall, Bodle
1 April 1946	Plymouth Argyle	A	W	3–2	Jones 3
6 April 1946	Nottingham Forest	A	L	0–1	
10 April 1946	Portsmouth	H	W	1–0	Jones
13 April 1946	Nottingham Forest	H	W	3–1	Bodle, Jones, Harris
15 April 1946	Fulham	A	L	2–3	Dougall 2
19 April 1946	Newport County	H	W	3–2	Mulraney, Massart 2
20 April 1946	Wolverhampton Wanderers	A	D	3–3	Bodle, Edwards, Harris
22 April 1946	Newport County	A	W	1–0	Massart
27 April 1946	Wolverhampton Wanderers	H	L	0–1	
29 April 1946	Charlton Athletic	A	D	0–0	
4 May 1946	Luton Town	A	W	3–0	Bodle, Mitchell pen, Mulraney

=== League table (part) ===
Pos	Team	Pld	W	D	L	GF	GA	GR	Pts
1	Birmingham City	42	28	5	9	96	45	2.133	61
2	Aston Villa	42	25	11	6	106	58	1.828	61
3	Charlton Athletic	42	25	10	7	92	45	2.044	60
4	Derby County	42	22	8	12	104	62	1.677	52
5	West Bromwich Albion	42	22	8	12	104	69	1.507	52

Source: rsssf.com and War Hammers II

== FA Cup ==
From the first round proper to the sixth round of the 1945–46 FA Cup, the first edition of the competition to be completed since war broke out, matches were played over two legs. Birmingham defeated Portsmouth, Watford, Sunderland and Bradford Park Avenue to reach the semi-final, in which they drew with Derby County at Hillsborough, Sheffield, in front of 65,000 spectators. In a match that "did not produce a great deal of high-class play [but] was very keenly contested", Raich Carter opened the scoring from Derby's first attack, Jock Mulraney "hit the angle of bar and post with a glorious shot from twenty yards", and the same player equalised early in the second half "after one of the best movements of the game".

The replay, at Maine Road, Manchester, attracted huge interest. The second half of the match was scheduled for live radio broadcast, and the gates were closed on safety grounds about an hour before kickoff, with thousands locked out. "Several thousands" of the official attendance of 80,407 "were allowed to sit on the ground almost up to the touch line". The match went goalless to the last half-minute of normal time, when Harold Bodle was unmarked 20 yards (18 m) from goal. Derby goalkeeper Vic Woodley stayed on his line, and "Bodle took the ball to within eight yards of goal but hit the ball so near to Woodley that he was able to beat the ball away." Six minutes into extra time, defender Ted Duckhouse arrived just too late to stop Peter Doherty scoring Derby's first goal and sustained a broken leg in the collision with his opponent. No substitutes were allowed, and Birmingham went on to lose 4–0.

Round	Opponents	Date	Venue	Result	Score F–A	Scorers	Attendance
Third round	Portsmouth	5 January 1946	H	W	1–0	Flewin og	33,845
Third round	Portsmouth	9 January 1946	A	D	0–0		23,716
Third round	Portsmouth	aggregate		W	1–0		
Fourth round	Watford	26 January 1946	H	W	5–0	Mulraney 3, Jones, Bodle	25,054
Fourth round	Watford	30 January 1946	A	D	1–1	Jones	6,126
Fourth round	Watford	aggregate		W	6–1		
Fifth round	Sunderland	9 February 1946	A	L	0–1		44,820
Fifth round	Sunderland	13 February 1946	H	W	3–1	Jones 2, Mulraney	39,880
Fifth round	Sunderland	aggregate		W	3–2		
Sixth round	Bradford Park Avenue	2 March 1946	A	D	2–2	Dougall, Jones	19,732
Sixth round	Bradford Park Avenue	9 March 1946	H	W	6–0	Dougall 2, Bodle 2, Mulraney 2	49,858
Sixth round	Bradford Park Avenue	aggregate		W	8–2		
Semi-final	Derby County	23 March 1946	Hillsborough, Sheffield	D	1–1	Mulraney	65,013
Semi-final replay	Derby County	27 March 1946	Maine Road, Manchester	L	0–4 aet		80,407

== Appearances and goals ==
- Players marked * were guests, not registered Birmingham City players.

Players having played at least one first-team match
Pos.	Nat.	Name	League		FA Cup		Total	
Pos.	Nat.	Name	Apps	Goals	Apps	Goals	Apps	Goals
GK	ENG	Ted Ditchburn *	1	0	0	0	1	0
GK	ENG	Sid King	2	0	2	0	4	0
GK	ENG	Gil Merrick	39	0	8	0	47	0
FB	ENG	Ted Duckhouse	26	6	10	0	36	6
FB	WAL	Billy Hughes	4	0	0	0	4	0
FB	—	N. Jenks	2	0	0	0	2	0
FB	ENG	Dennis Jennings	41	0	10	0	51	0
FB	ENG	Ray Shaw	2	0	0	0	2	0
FB	ENG	Sid Stanton	1	0	0	0	1	0
HB	ENG	Don Dearson	34	1	0	0	34	1
HB	ENG	Fred Harris	39	2	10	0	49	2
HB	ENG	Frank Mitchell	26	1	10	0	36	1
HB	ENG	Syd Owen	5	0	0	0	5	0
HB	ENG	Arthur Turner	40	2	10	0	50	2
FW	ENG	Harold Bodle	40	16	10	3	50	19
FW	SCO	Neil Dougall	38	10	10	3	48	13
FW	WAL	George Edwards	38	13	10	0	48	13
FW	WAL	Charlie Wilson Jones	27	20	10	5	37	25
FW	SCO	Bobby Laing	2	1	0	0	2	1
FW	—	I. McPherson *	1	0	0	0	1	0
FW	ENG	Dave Massart	11	9	0	0	11	9
FW	SCO	Jock Mulraney	38	13	10	7	48	20
FW	ENG	Cyril Trigg	1	0	0	0	1	0
FW	ENG	Frank White *	4	2	0	0	4	2

== See also ==
- Birmingham City F.C. seasons
