= 1983–84 in English football =

Football in England
- Season: 1983–84

Men's football
- First Division: Liverpool
- Second Division: Chelsea
- Third Division: Oxford United
- Fourth Division: York City
- Alliance Premier League: Maidstone United
- FA Cup: Everton
- Associate Members' Cup: AFC Bournemouth
- League Cup: Liverpool
- Charity Shield: Manchester United

The 1983–84 season was the 104th season of competitive football in England.

== Diary of the season ==
6 June 1983: Resurgent Portsmouth, newly promoted to the Second Division after winning last season's Third Division title, prepare for their latest challenge by paying a club record £180,000 for Coventry City's 21-year-old striker Mark Hateley.

1 July 1983: Joe Fagan, 62, is appointed as the new manager of Liverpool on a two-year contract following Bob Paisley's retirement after nine years in charge.

1 August 1983: Gerry Francis, former England midfielder, is appointed player-manager of Exeter City.

4 August 1983: Chelsea, who narrowly avoided relegation to the Third Division last season, pay Reading £175,000 for 21-year-old striker Kerry Dixon.

20 August 1983: Bryan Robson scores both of Manchester United's goals in the FA Charity Shield as they beat Liverpool 2–0.

27 August 1983: The Football League season commences. Notts County are top of the First Division with a 4–0 away win over East Midlands rivals Leicester City. A seven-goal thriller at Villa Park sees Aston Villa beat local rivals West Bromwich Albion 4–3. Liverpool begin their quest for a third successive league title with a 1–1 away draw against newly promoted Wolves. Chelsea record the biggest win in the Second Division with a 5–0 triumph over Derby County at Stamford Bridge.

31 August 1983: Notts County, West Ham United, Aston Villa and Arsenal all win their first two matches of the First Division season to lead the table at the end of August. Leicester City, Birmingham City and West Bromwich Albion lose their first two matches of the season.

3 September 1983: West Ham are the only First Division side with a 100% record after three games after beating London rivals Tottenham Hotspur 2–0 at White Hart Lane.

6 September 1983: West Ham extend their 100% start to the season to four games and remain top with a 3–1 home win over Leicester City. Manchester United beat Arsenal 3–2 at Highbury. Ipswich are second in the table with three wins from their opening four games after a 3–0 home win over Everton.

10 September 1983: West Ham make it five wins in a row with a 5–2 home win over Coventry City, with David Swindlehurst scoring a hat-trick. Ipswich keep up their challenge with a 5–0 home win over Stoke City, as do third-placed Manchester United with a 2–0 home win over Luton Town. Leicester City are still looking for their first point of the season after a 3–0 home defeat at home to Tottenham Hotspur.

17 September 1983: West Ham's perfect start to the season ends with a 1–0 defeat at West Bromwich Albion, although they are still top of the First Division. Southampton go second with a 3–0 home win over Manchester United. Manchester City's bid for an immediate return to the First Division is boosted by a 6–0 home win over Blackburn Rovers, lifting them to second place in the Second Division. Swansea City are facing a battle avoid a second successive relegation after collecting one point from their first five games.

21 September 1983: England lose 1–0 to Denmark in their European Championship qualifier at Wembley, making qualification for the Finals unlikely.

23 September 1983: Newcastle United boost their Second Division promotion push by signing Peter Beardsley, who was rejected by Manchester United last previous season, in a £150,000 deal from Vancouver Whitecaps.

24 September 1983: West Ham return to their winning ways and maintain their lead of the First Division by beating Notts County 3–0 at Upton Park. Manchester United keep up the pressure by beating Liverpool 1–0 at Old Trafford. Southampton's title challenge is hit with a 1–0 defeat away to Aston Villa, who go sixth in the table. Wolves, with no wins from their first seven games, lose 4–0 at home to QPR. Leicester City finally pick up a league point at the seventh attempt with a 2–2 draw at home to Stoke City.

27 September 1983: Manchester United progress to the second round of the European Cup Winners' Cup by eliminating Czech side Dukla Prague on away goals.

28 September 1983: All four English entrants in the UEFA Cup – Watford, Nottingham Forest, Tottenham Hotspur and Aston Villa – progress to the second round. Tottenham recorded a 14–0 aggregate victory over Irish side Drogheda United, while Watford came from 3–1 down against West German side Kaiserlautern in the first leg to win the second leg 3–0 at Vicarage Road.

30 September 1983: With six wins from seven matches, West Ham United are top of the First Division at the end of September, with Manchester United, Southampton, Liverpool and Ipswich Town completing the top five. Leicester City's terrible start to the season sees them prop up the top flight with only a single point from their opening seven games. Wolverhampton Wanderers (winless) and Stoke City (one win) complete the bottom three. Sheffield Wednesday head the race for promotion from the Second Division, followed closely behind by recently relegated Manchester City and a Huddersfield Town side who only won promotion from the Fourth Division four seasons ago. Middlesbrough, Charlton Athletic and Chelsea have also made a good start to the Second Division campaign.

1 October 1983: First Division leaders West Ham lose 3–1 to Stoke City at the Victoria Ground. Southampton cut their lead of the table to a single point with a 1–0 win over Wolves at The Dell. Ipswich keep up the pressure by beating Coventry City 2–1 at Highfield Road. Manchester United miss the chance to draw level on points with the leaders when Norwich City hold them to a 3–3 draw in the thrilling match at Carrow Road. Leicester's shambolic start to the season continues with a 2–1 away defeat to Birmingham City. In the Second Division, leaders Sheffield Wednesday beat Blackburn Rovers 4–2 at Hillsborough. Struggling Derby County lose 4–1 at home to Carlisle United. Newcastle United boost their promotion push with a 4–2 home win over Portsmouth. Brighton give their hopes of an instant return to the First Division a major boost by beating Charlton Athletic 7–0 at the Goldstone Ground. Fallen giants Leeds United lose 5–1 at Shrewsbury.

2 October 1983: In the first fully televised Football League match for 23 years, Tottenham beat Nottingham Forest 2–1 at White Hart Lane.

8 October 1983: Despite the lack of First Division today, all 22 Second Division clubs are in action. Craven Cottage is the scene of an eight-goal thriller in which Chelsea boost their promotion push with a 5–3 away win over West London rivals Fulham.

12 October 1983: England keep their faint hopes of European Championship qualification alive by beating Hungary 3–0 in Budapest in their penultimate qualifying game, but Denmark remain top of the group.

15 October 1983: First Division action returns with Manchester United beating West Bromwich Albion 3–0 at Old Trafford to go top of the First Division, with West Ham's lead of the table being ended by a 3–1 home defeat to Liverpool. Wolves are still without a victory nine games into the season after losing 3–2 at home to Tottenham.

16 October 1983: Nottingham Forest beat neighbours Notts County 3–1 at the City Ground in the only First Division action of the day.

20 October 1983: Coventry City sign 21-year-old full-back Stuart Pearce from Alliance Premier League side Wealdstone.

22 October 1983: Manchester United remain top of the First Division with a 1–0 win over Sunderland at Roker Park. A mid-table clash at Highbury sees Arsenal beat Nottingham Forest 4–1. Leicester City claim their second point of the season with a 2–2 draw at Ipswich, but are still winless after 10 league games.

23 October 1983: The only league action of the day sees Wolves draw 1–1 at home to local rivals Aston Villa in a First Division, making it three points after 10 games, but still no league victories.

26 October 1983: Giant-killings in the second round of the Football League Cup, as third-tier clubs Oxford United and Wimbledon knock out Newcastle United and Nottingham Forest. Elsewhere in round two, Leeds United overcome a 1–0 deficit from the first leg to beat the Football League's basement club Chester City 4–2 on aggregate and Lincoln City win on the night at home to Tottenham Hotspur but lose out on aggregate. There is no such joy for Bury, who lose 10–0 to West Ham at Upton Park (12–1 on aggregate) with teenage striker Tony Cottee scoring four goals.

30 October 1983: Manchester United maintain their lead of the First Division with a 3–0 home win over Wolves, who are still winless after 11 games. Leicester City record their first league win of the season with a 2–0 home win over Everton. Tony Woodcock scores five goals in Arsenal's 6–2 away win over Aston Villa. Ian Rush scores five in Liverpool's 6–0 home win over Luton Town. QPR go third with a 3–0 away win over Norwich City. The Abbey Stadium is the scene of a goal glut in the Second Division as Brighton beat Cambridge United 4–3. Chelsea boost their promotion hopes and deal a blow to the visiting side's by defeating Charlton Athletic 3–2 at Stamford Bridge. Peter Beardsley scores a hat-trick in Newcastle's 5–0 home win over Manchester City.

31 October 1983: October draws to a close with Manchester United top of the First Division. Liverpool continue their push for a third successive league title as they stand second, while newly promoted Queens Park Rangers occupy third place, level on points with West Ham United, Southampton and Tottenham Hotspur. Wolverhampton Wanderers, still without a win after 11 games, remain bottom of the table. Leicester City and Notts County complete the bottom three. Sheffield Wednesday are still top of the Second Division, joined in the top three by Newcastle United and Manchester City. Chelsea, Huddersfield Town and Grimsby Town are pushing them hard for promotion.

1 November 1983: Watford sign 20-year-old striker Mo Johnston from Partick Thistle for £200,000.

2 November 1983: Liverpool progress to the quarter-finals of the European Cup at the expense of Spanish champions Atletico Bilbao. Manchester United reach the quarter-finals of the European Cup Winners' Cup with a 4–1 aggregate win over Bulgarian side Spartak Varna. Tottenham eliminate Dutch side Feyenoord 6–2 on aggregate in the second round of the UEFA Cup. Watford eliminate Levski Sofia from the competition and Nottingham Forest oust PSV Eindhoven, but Aston Villa are edged out 4–3 on aggregate by Spartak Moscow.

5 November 1983 – Wolves are bottom of the First Division and still winless after 12 games following a 5–0 defeat at Nottingham Forest. Peter Withe scores twice as Aston Villa inflict a 2–1 defeat on Manchester United at Old Trafford, meaning that Liverpool can return to the top of the table if they win their game tomorrow. Arsenal's erratic form continues as they lose 2–1 at home to Sunderland. There is no shortage of action in the race to reach the First Division. Second Division leaders Sheffield Wednesday maintain a four-point lead at the top of the table by beating Yorkshire rivals Barnsley 2–0 at Hillsborough. Newcastle United win 3–2 at home to Fulham. Manchester City remain in the top three by beating Shrewsbury Town 3–1 at Gay Meadow. Chelsea's promotion push takes a dent when they are held to a 1–1 draw by struggling Oldham at Boundary Park, but they are just three points outside the top three with a game in hand.

6 November 1983 – Liverpool go top of the First Division with a 3–0 win over Everton in the Merseyside derby at Anfield.

10 November 1983 – Everton sign striker Andy Gray from Wolves for £250,000.

12 November 1983 – Liverpool remain top of the First Division despite being held to a 2–2 draw at Tottenham. West Ham keep up the pressure with a 3–0 away win over Wolves, who are still winless after 13 games. Manchester United miss the chance to return to the top of the table when they are held to a 1–1 draw at Leicester. Southampton climb from eighth to fourth with a 1–0 home win over West Bromwich Albion. Arsenal suffer another setback when they lose 1–0 at Ipswich. Brighton's hopes of an instant return to the First Division appear to be fading fast after a 4–0 defeat to Manchester City at Maine Road leaves them 16th in the Second Division. Chelsea close the gap between themselves and the top three with a 4–0 home win over Newcastle United.

16 November 1983: England fail to qualify for the European Championships despite a 4–0 away win over Luxembourg in their final qualifying game, as Denmark win 2–0 in Greece to top the group.

19 November 1983: The first round of the FA Cup sees non-league sides Whitby Town and Telford United both overcome Football League opposition. In the First Division, Everton manager Howard Kendall is under mounting pressure after a 2–1 defeat at Arsenal leaves his side 17th in the table. Tottenham continue their surge up the table with a 4–2 win over Luton Town at Kenilworth Road. Liverpool remain top with a 1–0 home win over Stoke City. West Ham are still just a point behind the leaders with a 1–0 win over Sunderland at Roker Park. Frank Stapleton scores a hat-trick in Manchester United's 4–1 home win over Watford, which boosts their goal difference and keeps them level with West Ham and a single point behind Liverpool. Wolves are still winless 14 games into the season and claim their fourth point with a goalless draw at home to fifth-placed Coventry City. A 4–1 home win for Arsenal against Leicester takes some of the pressure off under-fire manager Terry Neill. In the Second Division, Newcastle drop out of the top three with a 4–2 defeat at leaders Sheffield Wednesday, allowing Chelsea to climb into the promotion places despite being held to a 2–2 draw at home by their London rivals Crystal Palace. Manchester City remain in the top three despite losing 2–0 to Carlisle United at Brunton Park.

21 November 1983: Worcester City become the third non-league team this season to knock Football League opposition out of the FA Cup when they beat Aldershot 2–1.

22 November 1983: FA Cup first round replays fail to produce any giant-killing feats but a non-league clash between London rivals Enfield and Wealdstone ends in a 2–2 draw and forces a second replay. There are also replays for four League Cup fourth round ties. Two of these matches go to a second replay – including Liverpool's clash with Fulham at Anfield, which ends in a 1–1 draw. The only league action of the day sees Chelsea go second in the table with a 3–1 win over Swansea City at the Vetch Field. Swansea are now bottom of the Second Division with just one win from their first 15 games and are currently seven points adrift of safety, a mere 18 months after finishing sixth in the First Division.

23 November 1983: Watford further boost their ranks with the £150,000 signing of 19-year-old defender David Bardsley from Blackpool. Maidstone United from the Alliance Premier League knock Third Division Exeter City out of the FA Cup in a first round replay.

26 November 1983: Kenny Dalglish scores his 100th competitive goal for Liverpool in a 1-1 league draw against Ipswich Town. Elsewhere, QPR fail to hold on to their lead at fellow Londoners Spurs, who win 3–2 thanks to Mark Falco's double and Steve Archibald's 15th of the season. Notts County boost their bid to keep clear of the relegation zone with a 5–2 win over Aston Villa. Leicester City are just two points adrift of safety after a 3–0 home win over Arsenal. Watford, runners-up in the league last season, are still in the bottom three after a 2–1 home defeat to local rivals Luton Town, who shoot up from 10th to fifth in the table. Wolves finally win a league game at the 15th attempt when they overcome local rivals West Bromwich Albion 3–1 at The Hawthorns. The highest-scoring game of the day sees Burnley boost their hopes of a quick return to the Second Division when they beat bottom-of-the-table Port Vale 7–0 at Turf Moor.

27 November 1983: Liverpool remain top of the First Division after their nearest rivals West Ham United and Manchester United draw 1–1 at Upton Park. A decisive result for either side would have seen the winner of the game going top of the league.

29 November 1983: Liverpool finally beat Fulham at the third attempt by triumphing 1–0 in front of nearly 21,000 fans at Craven Cottage in their League Cup third round second replay. The fourth round tie between Arsenal and Walsall at Highbury produces a shock result when the Third Division visitors win 2–1. The surprise result has echoes of Walsall's shock win over Arsenal back in January 1933, when they beat the Gunners 2–0 at Fellows Park.

30 November 1983: Liverpool's bid for a third successive league title is now looking stronger, as they finish November as First Division leaders with a one-point lead over West Ham United and Manchester United. Tottenham Hotspur occupy fourth place, while Luton Town are fifth. Wolverhampton Wanderers, with just one win, are still bottom of the table, with Watford (the previous season's runners-up) and Stoke City completing the bottom three. Sheffield Wednesday are still top of the Second Division, while Newcastle United remain in the top three, with Chelsea overtaking Manchester City to move into third. In the League Cup, Oxford United hold Manchester United to a 1–1 draw at the Manor Ground in a fourth round tie. United give a first team debut to 20-year-old Welsh striker Mark Hughes. Norwich City beat their East Anglian rivals Ipswich Town 1–0 at Portman Road. There is another local derby in the competition at The Hawthorns, where Aston Villa beat West Bromwich Albion 2–1. In the only league action of the day, Leicester City climb out of the bottom three with a 2–1 home win over Southampton.

1 December 1983: Newcastle United further boost their promotion bid with the £150,000 acquisition of QPR defender Glenn Roeder, while Terry Neill makes a last-ditch attempt to reverse Arsenal's dismal league form by signing 21-year-old Manchester City defender Tommy Caton for £500,000.

3 December 1983: The pressure mounts further on Arsenal manager Terry Neill after a 1–0 defeat at home to West Bromwich Albion leaves his side 15th in the First Division. Leaders Liverpool are now four points ahead at the top of the table after a 1–0 win over Birmingham City, as Manchester United lose 1–0 at home to Everton and West Ham United are beaten 1–0 by Aston Villa at Villa Park. Coventry City keep up the pressure on the leading pack with a 4–2 away win over Luton Town. Watford climb out of the bottom three with a 5–0 away win over Wolves.

4 December 1983: Nottingham Forest beat their East Midlands rivals Leicester City 3–2 in a First Division clash at the City Ground, lifting the hosts up from 11th place to sixth.

6 December 1983: Everton boost their chances of ending their 14-year wait for a major trophy by beating West Ham United 2–0 in a League Cup fourth round replay at Goodison Park. In the Second Division, Chelsea boost their promotion push and increase Swansea's relegation worries with a 6–1 win at Stamford Bridge.

7 December 1983: Watford's UEFA Cup quest ends in a 7-2 aggregate defeat to Sparta Prague in the third round. Nottingham Forest progress to the quarter-finals with a 2–1 win over Celtic at Parkhead, after the first leg at the City Ground ended in a goalless draw. On the domestic scene, Oxford United take Manchester United to a second replay in the League Cup third round after a 1–1 draw at Old Trafford.

10 December 1983: Coventry City achieve one of the most surprising results of the season by defeating league champions Liverpool 4–0 at Highfield Road. Striker Terry Gibson scores a hat-trick. The defeat cuts Liverpool's lead at the top of the First Division to a single point following victories for both West Ham United and Manchester United. Coventry are now fourth and just three points off the top of the table. QPR climb from ninth to fifth with a 2–1 away win over West Bromwich Albion. Notts County stay clear of the relegation zone after another rout, this time beating Sunderland 6–1 at Meadow Lane. Luton Town remain in touch with the leading pack by winning 4–2 at Stoke City. Wolves are now nine points adrift of safety after losing 6–1 to Leicester City at Filbert Street. Arsenal are just five points clear of the relegation zone after losing 3–1 at West Ham. In the Second Division, Newcastle United beat Huddersfield Town 5–2 on Tyneside to return to the top three at the expense of Manchester City, who lose 2–1 at home to leaders Sheffield Wednesday.

14 December 1983: Telford United beat Football League opposition in the FA Cup for the second time this season, beating Northampton Town 3–2 at home.

16 December 1983: Terry Neill is sacked after more than seven years as manager of Arsenal, who occupy 16th place in the First Division. Manchester United go top of the league with a 4–2 home win over Tottenham.

17 December 1983: Liverpool return to the top of the First Division with a 5–0 home win over Notts County. Aston Villa keep up the pressure on the leading pack with a 4–0 home win over Ipswich Town. Caretaker manager Don Howe begins his spell in charge of Arsenal with a 3–1 home win over Watford. Coventry City miss the chance to close the gap on the leaders with a goalless draw at Norwich. QPR go fourth with a 2–0 home win over Everton.

18 December 1983: Luton Town are sixth in the First Division and just five points behind the leaders after beating West Bromwich Albion 2–0 at Kenilworth Road.

19 December 1983: Arsenal sell misfit striker Lee Chapman to Sunderland for £200,000. Manchester United bow out of the League Cup after losing their second third round replay 2–1 to Oxford United at the Manor Ground.

20 December 1983: Liverpool's bid for a fourth successive League Cup triumph continues when they draw 1–1 with Birmingham City in the fourth round.

22 December 1983: Liverpool beat Birmingham City 3–0 in the League Cup fourth round replay at Anfield.

24 December 1983: Griffin Park is the scene of the last league action before Christmas, with struggling Brentford losing 4–3 at home to a Wimbledon side pushing for a second successive promotion.

26 December 1983: Boxing Day drama in the First Division sees Liverpool extend their lead to three points with a 2–1 away win over West Bromwich Albion, while Manchester United are held to a 1–1 draw at Coventry. Luton Town go third with a 3–0 away win over Notts County. Wolves are now 10 points adrift of safety and have still only won one of their first 19 games, going down 3–1 at Ipswich. Arsenal's recovery continues as they triumph 4–2 over Tottenham in the North London derby at White Hart Lane.

27 December 1983: Wolves gain their first home win of the season with a 3–0 victory against Everton, while Manchester United throw away a two-goal lead to draw 3–3 with struggling Notts County in a bad-tempered match featuring nine yellow cards for the East Midlanders.

28 December 1983: Nottingham Forest are five points off the top of the First Division after beating Coventry City 3–0 at the City Ground.

31 December 1983: The year draws to a close with Liverpool still top of the First Division by a three-point margin over Manchester United, having beaten Nottingham Forest 1–0 at the City Ground, while Ron Atkinson's men keep up the pressure with a 1–0 home win over Stoke City. West Ham United go third with a 4–1 home win over Tottenham at Upton Park. Wolves make it back-to-back victories and are now just five points adrift of safety after a 2–0 home win over Norwich City. Chelsea go top of the Second Division with a 1–0 home win over Brighton.

2 January 1984: Liverpool and Manchester United draw 1–1 at Anfield to keep the gap at the top three points wide. West Ham miss the chance to cut the gap between themselves and the top two after being held to a 2–2 draw at Notts County. Nottingham Forest close in on the top three with a 3–2 away win over Luton Town. Tottenham's erratic league form continues with a 3–2 home defeat to Watford. Sheffield Wednesday regain their lead of the Second Division with a 3–0 home win over Oldham Athletic. Manchester City are held to a 1–1 draw at home to Leeds United and surrender their top-three place to Newcastle United, who beat Barnsley 1–0 at home.

6 January 1984: The FA Cup third round ties begin with a 4–0 win for Liverpool at home to Newcastle United.

7 January 1984: AFC Bournemouth pull off one of the biggest FA Cup upsets of all time with a 2–0 win over holders Manchester United in the third round. Arsenal, Leicester City and QPR lose to Second Division opponents (Middlesbrough, Crystal Palace and Huddersfield Town respectively), while Manchester City are beaten 2–1 by Fourth Division Blackpool. Telford make it three giant-killing ties in a row by beating Rochdale 4–1 at Spotland.

14 January 1984: Leicester City continue their climb towards safety with a 5–2 away win over local rivals Notts County. Leaders Liverpool suffer a shock 1–0 home defeat at home to Wolves, with Steve Mardenborough scoring the only goal of the game and giving Wolves a major boost in their bid for survival, making it three wins from their last four league games.

17 January 1984: QPR beat Stoke City 6–0 at Loftus Road to put themselves fourth in the First Division and six points behind leaders Liverpool.

20 January 1984: Ian Rush scores a hat-trick in Liverpool's 3–1 away win over Aston Villa in the First Division, increasing their lead at the top to five points, although their nearest challengers Manchester United can cut the gap to two points if they win at the weekend.

21 January 1984: Manchester United cut Liverpool's lead of the First Division to two points by beating Southampton 3–2 at Old Trafford. West Ham keep up their title challenge with a 2–0 home win over West Bromwich Albion, as do Nottingham Forest with a 3–0 home win over Norwich City.

23 January 1984: Nottingham Forest are now just three points off the top of the First Division after beating Southampton 1–0 at The Dell.

24 January 1984: Everton reach the League Cup semi-finals with a 4–1 win over Oxford United in their quarter-final replay clash at Goodison Park.

25 January 1984: Liverpool reach the League Cup semi-finals with a 3–0 win over Sheffield Wednesday in their quarter-final replay clash at Anfield.

28 January 1984: Stoke City boost their survival hopes by beating Arsenal 1–0 in their First Division clash at the Victoria Ground.

29 January 1984: Brighton & Hove Albion knock Liverpool out of the FA Cup for the second season running.

31 January 1984: AFC Bournemouth's FA Cup run ends with in a 2–0 defeat to Middlesbrough in the fourth round at Ayresome Park. Everton are held to a goalless draw by Gillingham in their fourth round tie at Priestfield.

1 February 1984: Telford United's FA Cup ends in a 3–2 defeat to Derby County in their fourth round clash at the Baseball Ground. Tottenham's hopes of winning the FA Cup for a record eighth time are ended by a 2–1 defeat to Norwich City at Carrow Road. In the First Division, Liverpool sustain their lead of the league with a 3–0 win over Watford at Anfield.

3 February 1984: Media mogul Robert Maxwell, who already owns Third Division promotion challengers Oxford United, is reported to be on the verge of taking over Manchester United in a deal worth up to £10million.

4 February 1984: Leaders Liverpool are held to a goalless draw by Sunderland in the First Division at Roker Park. Manchester United fail to close the gap at the top when Norwich hold them to a goalless draw at Old Trafford, although third-placed West Ham take advantage of the top two's failure to win by beating Stoke City 3–0 at Upton Park. Nottingham Forest's title hopes are hit by a 2–2 draw at home to Tottenham. Fifth-placed QPR keep up the pressure on the leading pack by beating Arsenal 2–0 at Highbury. The top four sides in the Second Division are all in action today. Sheffield Wednesday are held to a goalless draw by Blackburn Rovers at Ewood Park, allowing Chelsea to extend their lead at the top of the table with a 3–1 home win over Huddersfield Town. Manchester City are held to a 1–1 draw by Grimsby Town at Blundell Park, allowing fourth-placed Newcastle United to draw level on points by beating Portsmouth 4–1 at Fratton Park. Grimsby are now fifth and looking like serious contenders for promotion to the First Division, in which they last played just after the Second World War.

6 February 1984: Gillingham's hopes of ousting Everton from the FA Cup are ended when the Merseysiders win the FA Cup fourth replay 3–0.

7 February 1984: Walsall hold Liverpool to a 2–2 draw in the League Cup semi-final first leg at Anfield. In the First Division, their lead of the First Division stands at four points after Manchester United are held to a 2–2 draw at Birmingham City. Third-placed West Ham United also drop points, being held to a 1–1 draw by QPR at Loftus Road.

8 February 1984: Midweek drama in the First Division sees Nottingham Forest win 5–0 away to West Bromwich Albion to go second in the league and three points behind Liverpool. Tottenham beat Sunderland 3–0 at White Hart Lane.

11 February 1984: Liverpool remain top of the First Division with a 2–1 home win over Arsenal. Nottingham Forest keep up the pressure with a 1–0 away win over QPR, as do West Ham with a 2–1 away win over Coventry City. Tottenham continue to close in on the top five with a 3–2 home win over Leicester City. Watford's revival continues as they climb up to 11th with a 5–3 away win over Notts County.

12 February 1984: Bryan Robson and Norman Whiteside score twice and Frank Stapleton is also on the scoresheet as Manchester United beat Luton Town 5–0 at Kenilworth Road. The result means that United are now four points off the top of the table, and also deals a major blow to Luton's hopes of qualifying for the UEFA Cup just two seasons after being promoted.

14 February 1984: Liverpool reach the final of the Football League Cup for the fourth year in a row after a 4-2 aggregate victory over Third Division Walsall. In the First Division, QPR remain firmly in the top five with a 2–0 home win over Norwich City.

15 February 1984: Everton beat Aston Villa 2–0 in the League Cup semi-final first leg.

17 February 1984: Southampton beat Blackburn Rovers 1–0 in the FA Cup fifth round at Ewood Park.

18 February 1984: First Division West Bromwich Albion suffer a shock FA Cup exit at the hands of Third Division strugglers Plymouth Argyle, who win 1–0 in the fifth round match at The Hawthorns. West Ham's double hopes are ended when they lose 3–0 to Birmingham City at St Andrew's. Everton's cup adventures continue on both fronts as they beat Shrewsbury Town 3–0. Notts County beat Middlesbrough 1–0 at Meadow Lane. Sheffield Wednesday triumph 3–0 away to Oxford United. Watford beat Brighton 3–1 at Vicarage Road. In the First Division, Arsenal draw 1–1 with Aston Villa at Highbury and Stoke City win 3–2 at Coventry City. The top three of Liverpool, Manchester United and Nottingham Forest are all held to draws away from home.

21 February 1984: West Ham's title hopes are hit by a 4–2 home defeat to Watford.

22 February 1984: Despite losing 1–0 to Aston Villa in the semi-final second leg, Everton are through to the League Cup final, securing them their first cup final for seven years and the first all-Merseyside final in any of the domestic or European cup competitions.

25 February 1984: Wolves are now 13 points adrift of safety after losing 4–0 to local rivals Aston Villa in the First Division at Villa Park. Liverpool maintain a four-point lead at the top of the table, with Manchester United's 2–1 home win over Sunderland keeping up the pressure on the leaders. Nottingham Forest's title hopes take another blow they lose 1–0 at home to Arsenal. West Ham are now nine points behind the leaders after going down 1–0 at Norwich. An eight-goal thriller at Vicarage Road sees Watford and Everton draw 4-4.

28 February 1984: Birmingham City go seven points clear of the relegation zone with a 2–1 home win over local rivals West Bromwich Albion.

29 February 1984: England's first international game since their failure to qualify for the European Championship Finals ends in a 2–0 defeat to France in the Parc des Princes. On the club scene, Liverpool continue to top the First Division, with a four-point lead over Manchester United. Nottingham Forest, West Ham United and Southampton complete the top five. Wolverhampton Wanderers remain bottom of the table, 13 points adrift of safety with 14 games to go. Notts County are 11 points adrift of safety, and Stoke City complete the bottom three, just behind West Bromwich Albion, Leicester City and Ipswich Town. Sheffield Wednesday and Chelsea are level at the top of the Second Division, while Grimsby Town have crept into the top three at the expense of Manchester City.

3 March 1984: The Merseyside derby at Goodison Park ends in a 1–1 draw, allowing Manchester United to cut Liverpool's lead to two points by beating Aston Villa 3–0 at Villa Park. Nottingham Forest's title hopes are fading fast after their fall to another defeat, this time losing 1–0 at Wolves, who grab three points to boost their survival hopes. West Ham win 3–0 at Ipswich, and Southampton boost their hopes of making a late run to the title by beating Norwich City 2–1 at The Dell.

7 March 1984: European action resumes with four English clubs still in the three cups. Liverpool beat Portuguese champions SL Benfica 1–0 in the European Cup quarter-final first leg at Anfield, but Manchester United lose 2–0 to FC Barcelona in the European Cup Winners' Cup quarter-finals. Nottingham Forest beat Austrian side Sturm Graz 1–0 at the City Ground in the UEFA Cup quarter-final first leg, while Tottenham gain a 2–0 advantage over another Austrian side, Austria Vienna, in their quarter-final first leg. On the First Division scene, Sunderland move closer to safety with a 1–0 home win over QPR.

10 March 1984: Watford reach the FA Cup semi-finals for the first time in 14 years with a 3–1 away win over Birmingham City in the quarter-final tie at St Andrew's. Everton's hopes of a domestic cup double are kept alive as a 2–1 away win over Notts County takes them through. One of Home Park's largest-ever crowds of more than 34,000 sees Plymouth Argyle keep their FA Cup dream alive, with a goalless draw with Derby County forcing a replay at the Baseball Ground. First Division action includes victories for leaders Liverpool and second-placed Manchester United.

11 March 1984: Sheffield Wednesday and Southampton draw 0–0 in the FA Cup quarter-final at Hillsborough in front of more than 43,000 fans.

13 March 1984: Midweek action in the First Division includes a six-goal thriller at Highfield Road, where local rivals Coventry City and Aston Villa draw 3-3. Luton Town climb three places to eighth with a 2–1 win over Ipswich Town, who are now on the brink of the relegation zone just two seasons after finishing as runners-up. Notts County keep their survival hopes alive with a 1–0 away win over Norwich City. Nottingham Forest remain in touch with the top two with a 1–0 home win over Everton.

14 March 1984: FA Cup surprise package Plymouth Argyle book a semi-final place by beating Derby County 1–0 in the quarter-final replay at the Baseball Ground, four days after the first match ended in a goalless draw at Home Park.

16 March 1984: The First Division title race takes something of a surprise turn when Southampton beat Liverpool 2–0 at The Dell, putting themselves eight points the leaders with two games in hand, and giving Manchester United the chance to go top of the table if they win this weekend.

17 March 1984: Manchester United go top of the First Division with a 4–0 home win over Arsenal. Nottingham Forest's title challenge is fading as they go down 1–0 at Aston Villa, as is West Ham's following a 4–1 defeat to Leicester City at Filbert Street. Ipswich Town drop in the relegation zone after a 1–0 defeat at Everton, with Stoke City's 2–1 home win over Birmingham City lifting them out of the bottom three.

20 March 1984: Southampton become the fourth team to reach the FA Cup semi-finals, beating Sheffield Wednesday 5–1 in a quarter-final replay at The Dell.

21 March 1984: Oxford United, heading for promotion glory under Jim Smith in the Third Division, sign high-scoring Newport County striker John Aldridge for £78,000. Liverpool go through to the European Cup semi-finals with a 5–1 aggregate win over SL Benfica. Bryan Robson is instrumental with two goals as Manchester United overturn a 2–0 deficit against Barcelona to win the second leg of their European Cup quarter-final tie 3–0 and secure their first European semi-final appearance for 15 years. Tottenham Hotspur and Nottingham Forest both go through to the semi-finals of the UEFA Cup.

24 March 1984: Southampton's title hopes are hit by a 4–0 defeat at QPR. Wolves fall closer towards relegation with a 4–1 defeat at Arsenal. Their local rivals West Bromwich Albion move closer to survival with a 3–0 home win over Stoke City in a relegation crunch game at The Hawthorns.

25 March 1984: Liverpool and Everton draw 0–0 in the first all-Merseyside Football League Cup final. The match will be replayed at a neutral venue on 28 March.

28 March 1984: Liverpool win an unprecedented fourth successive Football League Cup by beating Everton 1–0 in the replay at Maine Road with captain Graeme Souness scoring the only goal of the game.

31 March 1984: Liverpool return to the top of the First Division with a 2–0 away win over Watford, as Manchester United lose 2–0 at West Bromwich Albion. Arsenal's revival continues as they climb up to eighth place with a 4–1 away win over Coventry City.

2 April 1984: Tottenham manager Keith Burkinshaw announces that he will resign as manager at the end of the season after nearly eight years in charge.

4 April 1984: Peter Taylor resigns as manager of Second Division strugglers Derby County, and is replaced on a caretaker basis by veteran player Roy McFarland.

7 April 1984: The gap at the top of the First Division remains at two points as Liverpool defeat West Ham 6–0 at Anfield and Manchester United beat Birmingham City 1–0 at Old Trafford. Watford's improved form is interrupted by a 6–1 defeat at Norwich. Nottingham Forest beat West Bromwich Albion 3–1 at the City Ground but are still nine points off the top of the table with eight games left to play. Wolves move closer towards relegation with a 1–0 defeat at home to Notts County, whose own survival hopes are boosted. The Second Division's top three clubs Chelsea, Sheffield Wednesday and Newcastle United are level on 69 points at the top of the table, seven points ahead of fourth-placed Manchester City, with the Owls having two games in hand over their direct rivals.

8 April 1984: Wolves sack manager Graham Hawkins after just under two years in charge.

9 April 1984: Thriving Arsenal's hopes of breaking into the top five are dented when they are held to a 0–0 draw by Everton at Goodison Park.

11 April 1984: Liverpool beat Dinamo Bucharest 1–0 in the European Cup semi-final first leg at Anfield. Manchester United draw 1–1 at home to Juventus in their first semi-final clash in the European Cup Winners' Cup. Tottenham's hopes of reaching the UEFA Cup final are dented by a 2–1 defeat to Hajduk Split in Yugoslavia, but Nottingham Forest go 2–0 up in the first leg of their semi-final clash at home to Anderlecht.

14 April 1984: Everton defeat Southampton 1–0 at Highbury in the FA Cup semi-finals to reach their first final for 16 years, while Watford reach the FA Cup final for the first time ever with a 1–0 win over giantkilling Plymouth Argyle at Villa Park. Liverpool lose 2–0 at Stoke City in the First Division, but Manchester United fail to take advantage and go down 1–0 at Notts County, allowing Joe Fagan's men to stay on top. Nottingham Forest fail to take advantage of the top two's defeat, and are only able to manage a 2–2 draw away to an Ipswich Town side who are still in the bottom three. Down in the Second Division, Cambridge United become the first team to be relegated this season, having won just two out of 36 games, while Swansea City are now almost certain to suffer a second successive relegation.

17 April 1984: Manchester United squander another chance to go top of the First Division, being held to a goalless draw at Watford. Nottingham Forest's title bid is fading fast as they go down 2–1 at Coventry City. Southampton beat Everton 3–1 at The Dell. West Ham keep up their bid for a UEFA Cup place with a 3–1 home win over Luton Town.

18 April 1984: The gap at the top of the First Division now stands at two points after Liverpool draw a thrilling game at Filbert Street 3–3 with Leicester City. Tottenham Hotspur remain in the hunt for another top-five finish by beating Aston Villa 2–1.

21 April 1984: Liverpool beat West Bromwich Albion 3–0 at Anfield in the First Division but Manchester United keep up the pressure on them with a 4–1 home win over Coventry City. Nottingham Forest's title challenge is practically over despite a 5–1 home win over Birmingham City. Southampton remain in with an outside chance of winning the title by beating West Ham 2–0 at The Dell. Wolves lose 3–0 at home to Ipswich Town, a result which boosts the Suffolk club's survival chances but leaves the hosts needing to win all six of their remaining games to have any chance of surviving even on goal difference.

23 April 1984: Wolves go down to the Second Division just one season after winning promotion, their relegation confirmed when they lose 2–0 to Everton at Goodison Park. Their local rivals West Bromwich Albion take another step closer to survival by beating Sunderland 3–1 at The Hawthorns. Ipswich Town climb out of the bottom three by beating East Anglian rivals Norwich City 2–0 at Portman Road. In the Second Division, Manchester City's promotion hopes are left looking slim after they lose 3–2 at home to Huddersfield Town, meaning that Sheffield Wednesday only need one point from their final six games to secure their return to the First Division after 14 years away. Newcastle United's title hopes are also given a huge boost with a 5–1 home win over Carlisle United.

25 April 1984: Liverpool reach their fourth European Cup final in eight seasons with a 3–1 aggregate win over Dinamo Bucharest in the semi-finals. Manchester United's hopes of European glory are ended when they lose their Cup Winners' Cup semi-final second leg 2–1 to Juventus in Turin. Nottingham Forest suffer a spectacular 3–0 defeat to Anderlecht in their UEFA Cup semi-final second leg tie in Belgium, after winning the first leg 2–0, ending their hopes of an all-English UEFA Cup final clash with Tottenham, who overcome Hajduk Split on away goals. Sheffield Wednesday's promotion celebrations are delayed by a 2–0 defeat to Middlesbrough at Ayresome Park.

28 April 1984: Southampton claim the biggest win of the First Division season with an 8–2 defeat of Coventry City, with Steve Moran and Danny Wallace both scoring hat-tricks, keeping the Saints in contention for the title. Liverpool are held to a 2–2 draw at home to Ipswich Town, but Manchester United miss the chance to draw level on points with the leaders after West Ham hold them to a goalless draw at Old Trafford. QPR's faint hopes of winning the title are kept alive with a 2–1 home win over Tottenham. Sheffield Wednesday's promotion is confirmed by a 1–0 home win over Crystal Palace, and are joined in the First Division next season by Chelsea, who go up in style by beating Leeds United 5–0 at home with top scorer Kerry Dixon scoring a hat-trick, although the Second Division title has yet to be decided. Newcastle United only need four points from their final three games to be sure of promotion.

1 May 1984: Notts County keep their survival hopes alive with a 4–0 home win over Wolves.

2 May 1984: Manchester City's hopes of an immediate return to the First Division are ended by a 2–0 home defeat to Chelsea.

5 May 1984: The First Division title race continues as Liverpool are held to a goalless draw at Birmingham City, while Manchester United draw 1–1 with Everton at Goodison Park. QPR keep up their title push with a 3–0 away win over Notts County, in which Clive Allen scores a hat-trick, leaving the home side needing to win their final three games to stand any chance of survival. Derby County are on the brink of going down to the Third Division a mere nine years after being First Division champions, after a 4–0 away defeat to Newcastle United, who now need just a point from their final two games to be sure of ending their six-year absence from the First Division.

7 May 1984: Liverpool are now just two points away from being league champions for the third successive season, having beaten Coventry City 5–0 at Anfield while Manchester United lose 2–1 at home to Ipswich Town. Notts County's relegation is confirmed when they fail to break the deadlock against Sunderland in a goalless draw at Roker Park. Nottingham Forest's 5–1 home win over Watford books them a second successive UEFA Cup campaign. Newcastle United secure their return to the First Division with a 2–2 draw against Huddersfield Town at Leeds Road. Oldham Athletic's 2–1 home win over Grimsby Town confirms Derby County's relegation to the Third Division

9 May 1984: Tottenham Hotspur draw 1–1 with Anderlecht in the first leg of the UEFA Cup Final in Brussels.

10 May 1984: Ray Wilkins accepts an offer to join AC Milan from Manchester United in a £1.5 million deal at the end of the season.

12 May 1984: Liverpool's third successive league title (and 15th overall) is confirmed when they draw 0–0 at Notts County and their last remaining rivals Manchester United are held to a 1–1 draw at Tottenham, and outsiders Southampton are held to a goalless draw at Birmingham, who are relegated after Coventry City and Stoke City both win their final games of the season. Chelsea seal the Second Division title on goal difference ahead of Sheffield Wednesday.

14 May 1984: Alan Mullery departs Crystal Palace, ostensibly "by mutual consent" though Palace players suspect the sack. Meanwhile, veteran player Archie Gemmill is one of eight released by Derby County, who will spend their centenary season in the Third Division.

16 May 1984: Nottingham Forest beat Manchester United 2–0 to leapfrog their opponents in second place in the First Division on goal difference.

17 May 1984: In the last match of the First Division season, Southampton beat Notts County 3–1 to finish in second place – the highest finish in their history – while Nottingham Forest, Manchester United and QPR complete the top five and qualify for the UEFA Cup.

19 May 1984: Everton win their first major trophy in 14 years by defeating Watford 2–0 in the FA Cup final with goals from Graeme Sharp and Andy Gray. This gives them entry to next season's European Cup Winners' Cup.

21 May 1984: PFA Young Player of the Year Paul Walsh joins Liverpool from Luton Town for £700,000 as manager Joe Fagan lines him up as a potential long-term successor to the 33-year-old Kenny Dalglish.

23 May 1984: Tottenham Hotspur draw 1–1 with Anderlecht in the UEFA Cup final second leg at White Hart Lane, and win 4–3 on penalties to lift the trophy.

25 May 1984: Everton pay Sunderland £425,000 for 22-year-old midfielder Paul Bracewell.

30 May 1984: Liverpool lift the European Cup, beating A.S. Roma 4–2 on penalties after a 1–1 draw in Rome. They become the first English team to win three major competitions in the same season.

31 May 1984: Keith Burkinshaw is succeeded as Tottenham manager by his assistant Peter Shreeves.

10 June 1984: John Barnes scores a spectacular goal for England in their 2–0 away win over Brazil in a friendly. After Luther Blissett and Mark Chamberlain 18 months previously, he becomes only the third black player to score for the full England team.

12 June 1984: Liverpool midfielder Graeme Souness departs for Italian club Sampdoria in a £650,000 deal.

22 June 1984: Coventry City sign 26-year-old goalkeeper Steve Ogrizovic from Shrewsbury Town for £72,000.

28 June 1984: AC Milan sign Portsmouth striker Mark Hateley for £915,000.

== National team ==
The England national football team had failed to qualify for Euro 84 but the FA kept faith in manager Bobby Robson. England also performed badly at the 1984 British Home Championship, coming joint second with Wales behind Northern Ireland but only scoring two goals in the process. However, a tour to South America during June instigated to replace the European Championship for the England team was more successful, with a notable victory over Brazil in the Maracanã Stadium.

=== American tour ===
10 June 1984

Brazil	0–2	England
		John Barnes, Mark Hateley

Maracanã Stadium, Rio de Janeiro

13 June 1984

Uruguay	2–0	England
Luis Acosta (P), Wilmar Cabrera

Centenario Stadium, Montevideo

17 June 1984

Chile	0–0	England

Estadio Nacional de Chile, Santiago

== European football ==
Liverpool won the European Cup beating Roma on penalties, to complete a unique treble of trophies. Keith Burkinshaw resigned after seven years as Tottenham manager, and went out on a high after his side won the UEFA Cup where they beat Anderlecht also on penalties.

== FA Cup ==
Everton overcame Watford 2–0 at Wembley to win the FA Cup, with goals from Graeme Sharp and Andy Gray. The biggest shock of the season came in the third round, when AFC Bournemouth beat holders Manchester United 2–0.

== League Cup ==
Liverpool won their fourth successive League Cup, with a 1–0 win over neighbours Everton in a replay.

== Football League ==
=== First Division ===
Liverpool became only the third English team to win three successive First Division titles and the first to win three major trophies in the season, as they won their fourth European Cup in eight seasons and their fourth Football League Cup in succession. But they were not without their contenders in the title race, which was not won until the beginning of May. Southampton enjoyed their best league season ever, finishing runners-up and reaching the semi-finals of the FA Cup (being unlikely contenders for the double until the final weeks of the season), while Nottingham Forest finished third, also taking in a run to the semi-finals of the UEFA Cup. Manchester United led the league more than once during the season but their form collapsed in the run-in and they finished fourth, the brightest moment of the season coming when they overhauled a two-goal deficit in the quarter-finals of the European Cup Winners' Cup to overcome a Barcelona side containing world superstar Diego Maradona. The top five was completed by newly promoted QPR, whose manager Terry Venables then accepted an offer to manage Barcelona.

After a dismal start to the season which saw many fans calling for the dismissal of manager Howard Kendall, Everton's fortunes took a dramatic upturn following the arrival of striker Andy Gray, which saw any fears of relegation swiftly forgotten as they climbed up the table and eventually finished seventh, and then ended their 14-year trophy drought by winning the FA Cup. Everton also reached the final of the Football League Cup, but were beaten in a replay by their Merseyside neighbours.

Tottenham Hotspur manager Keith Burkinshaw stepped down at the end of the campaign after eight years in charge, but went out on a high by winning the UEFA Cup. Watford climbed to a secure mid table finish after the arrival of high scoring striker Mo Johnston lifted them clear of the relegation zone, and they also reached their first ever FA Cup final, but lost to Everton.

Wolverhampton Wanderers suffered a swift return to the Second Division with just six wins all season, and were joined in the drop zone by Notts County and local rivals Birmingham City. Coventry City climbed clear of the drop zone after a turnaround in the final few games which had followed a dramatic slump down the table, while Luton Town's survival was ensured by an excellent first half of the season before a post-Christmas slump.

Pos	Team	Pld	W	D	L	GF	GA	GD	Pts	Qualification or relegation
1	Liverpool (C)	42	22	14	6	73	32	+41	80	Qualification for the European Cup first round
2	Southampton	42	22	11	9	66	38	+28	77	Qualification for the UEFA Cup first round
3	Nottingham Forest	42	22	8	12	76	45	+31	74	Qualification for the UEFA Cup first round
4	Manchester United	42	20	14	8	71	41	+30	74	Qualification for the UEFA Cup first round
5	Queens Park Rangers	42	22	7	13	67	37	+30	73	Qualification for the UEFA Cup first round
6	Arsenal	42	18	9	15	74	60	+14	63	
7	Everton	42	16	14	12	44	42	+2	62	Qualification for the European Cup Winners' Cup first round (Note: Everton qualified for the European Cup Winners' Cup as the 1983–84 FA Cup winners.)
8	Tottenham Hotspur	42	17	10	15	64	65	−1	61	Qualification for the UEFA Cup first round (Note: Tottenham Hotspur qualified for the UEFA Cup as the 1983–84 UEFA Cup winners.)
9	West Ham United	42	17	9	16	60	55	+5	60	
10	Aston Villa	42	17	9	16	59	61	−2	60	
11	Watford	42	16	9	17	68	77	−9	57	
12	Ipswich Town	42	15	8	19	55	57	−2	53	
13	Sunderland	42	13	13	16	42	53	−11	52	
14	Norwich City	42	12	15	15	48	49	−1	51	
15	Leicester City	42	13	12	17	65	68	−3	51	
16	Luton Town	42	14	9	19	53	66	−13	51	
17	West Bromwich Albion	42	14	9	19	48	62	−14	51	
18	Stoke City	42	13	11	18	44	63	−19	50	
19	Coventry City	42	13	11	18	57	77	−20	50	
20	Birmingham City (R)	42	12	12	18	39	50	−11	48	Relegation to the Second Division
21	Notts County (R)	42	10	11	21	50	72	−22	41	Relegation to the Second Division
22	Wolverhampton Wanderers (R)	42	6	11	25	27	80	−53	29	Relegation to the Second Division

Source: World Football
Rules for classification: 1) Points; 2) Goal difference; 3) Goals scored
(C) Champions; (R) Relegated

=== Second Division ===
A year after narrowly avoiding relegation, Chelsea thrived in the Second Division and won the title on goal difference, thanks largely to the prolific scoring of new striker Kerry Dixon. Sheffield Wednesday finished runners-up to end their 14-year exile from the First Division. The final promotion place went to Newcastle United, whose former England striker Kevin Keegan retired after achieving the objective of promotion that had been his clear target when signing for the Tynesiders two years earlier.

Although the top three all secured promotion before the final game of the campaign, there had been no shortage of competition in the promotion race for much of the season, from the likes of Manchester City, Grimsby Town and Carlisle United.

Dave Bassett agreed to take charge of Crystal Palace at the end of the season, but changed his mind three days later – without signing the contract – and returned to Wimbledon. Palace installed former Manchester United winger Steve Coppell, 29, as their new manager.

Cambridge United's six-year stay in the Second Division ended after a terrible season where they secured just four wins. Swansea City fared little better, going down for the second season running – a mere two years after finishing sixth in the First Division – as financial problems mounted. The last relegation place went to Derby County, First Division champions just nine years previously. Derby's Peter Taylor, who almost guided the club to the semi-finals in the FA Cup that season, resigned as manager and was succeeded by Arthur Cox, who had just taken Newcastle into the First Division.

Pos	Team	Pld	W	D	L	GF	GA	GD	Pts	Relegation
1	Chelsea (C, P)	42	25	13	4	90	40	+50	88	Promotion to the First Division
2	Sheffield Wednesday (P)	42	26	10	6	72	34	+38	88	Promotion to the First Division
3	Newcastle United (P)	42	24	8	10	85	53	+32	80	Promotion to the First Division
4	Manchester City	42	20	10	12	66	48	+18	70	
5	Grimsby Town	42	19	13	10	60	47	+13	70	
6	Blackburn Rovers	42	17	16	9	57	46	+11	67	
7	Carlisle United	42	16	16	10	48	41	+7	64	
8	Shrewsbury Town	42	17	10	15	49	53	−4	61	
9	Brighton & Hove Albion	42	17	9	16	69	60	+9	60	
10	Leeds United	42	16	12	14	55	56	−1	60	
11	Fulham	42	15	12	15	60	53	+7	57	
12	Huddersfield Town	42	14	15	13	56	49	+7	57	
13	Charlton Athletic	42	16	9	17	53	64	−11	57	
14	Barnsley	42	15	7	20	57	53	+4	52	
15	Cardiff City	42	15	6	21	53	66	−13	51	
16	Portsmouth	42	14	7	21	73	64	+9	49	
17	Middlesbrough	42	12	13	17	41	47	−6	49	
18	Crystal Palace	42	12	11	19	42	52	−10	47	
19	Oldham Athletic	42	13	8	21	47	73	−26	47	
20	Derby County (R)	42	11	9	22	36	72	−36	42	Relegation to the Third Division
21	Swansea City (R)	42	7	8	27	36	85	−49	29	Relegation to the Third Division
22	Cambridge United (R)	42	4	12	26	28	77	−49	24	Relegation to the Third Division

Rules for classification: 1) Points; 2) Goal difference; 3) Goals scored
(C) Champions; (P) Promoted; (R) Relegated

Administration entrance and exit without arrangements = Swansea City

=== Third Division ===
Jim Smith, who had guided Birmingham City into the First Division four years earlier, made use of Robert Maxwell's funds to strengthen Oxford United and this policy paid off at the second attempt as he led them to the Third Division title by a wide margin. Also going up were Wimbledon and Sheffield United, while Hull City failed to follow Wimbledon to a second successive promotion only on goals scored. Walsall, who enjoyed an impressive run to the Football League Cup semi-finals which included knocking out Arsenal and costing Gunners manager Terry Neill his job after seven years, finished sixth in the league. Millwall, who had achieved a remarkable escape from relegation a year earlier under new manager George Graham, progressed to ninth place in the Third Division.

Narrowly avoiding the Third Division drop zone were Plymouth Argyle, who compensated for their dismal league form by reaching the FA Cup semi finals for the first time in their history.

Exeter City, Port Vale, Southend United and Scunthorpe United ended the season relegated to the Fourth Division. New owner Anton Johnson made an instrumental move to reverse Southend's decline by appointed England's World Cup winning captain Bobby Moore as manager.

Pos	Team	Pld	W	D	L	GF	GA	GD	Pts	Promotion or relegation
1	Oxford United (C, P)	46	28	11	7	91	50	+41	95	Promotion to the Second Division
2	Wimbledon (P)	46	26	9	11	97	76	+21	87	Promotion to the Second Division
3	Sheffield United (P)	46	24	11	11	86	53	+33	83	Promotion to the Second Division
4	Hull City	46	23	14	9	71	38	+33	83	
5	Bristol Rovers	46	22	13	11	68	54	+14	79	
6	Walsall	46	22	9	15	68	61	+7	75	
7	Bradford City	46	20	11	15	73	65	+8	71	
8	Gillingham	46	20	10	16	74	69	+5	70	
9	Millwall	46	18	13	15	71	65	+6	67	
10	Bolton Wanderers	46	18	10	18	56	60	−4	64	
11	Orient	46	18	9	19	71	81	−10	63	
12	Burnley	46	16	14	16	76	61	+15	62	
13	Newport County	46	16	14	16	58	75	−17	62	
14	Lincoln City	46	17	10	19	59	62	−3	61	
15	Wigan Athletic	46	16	13	17	46	56	−10	61	
16	Preston North End	46	15	11	20	66	66	0	56	
17	Bournemouth	46	16	7	23	63	73	−10	55	
18	Rotherham United	46	15	9	22	57	64	−7	54	
19	Plymouth Argyle	46	13	12	21	56	62	−6	51	
20	Brentford	46	11	16	19	69	79	−10	49	
21	Scunthorpe United (R)	46	9	19	18	54	73	−19	46	Relegation to the Fourth Division
22	Southend United (R)	46	10	14	22	55	76	−21	44	Relegation to the Fourth Division
23	Port Vale (R)	46	11	10	25	51	83	−32	43	Relegation to the Fourth Division
24	Exeter City (R)	46	6	15	25	50	84	−34	33	Relegation to the Fourth Division

(C) Champions; (P) Promoted; (R) Relegated

=== Fourth Division ===
York City became the first English league team to amass 100 league points in a season, and in doing so clinched the Fourth Division title and a place in the Third Division. Leeds United legend Billy Bremner took Doncaster Rovers to promotion as runners-up, while Reading climbed out of the league's basement division in third place. The final promotion place went to a Bristol City side on the comeback trail after their recent catastrophic hat-trick of relegations and near brush with closure. Aldershot just missed out on promotion, as did a Blackpool side who had been under threat of closure and loss of league status a year earlier.

Chester propped up the league, and had to apply for re-election along with Hartlepool United, Halifax Town and Rochdale. All four clubs retained their league status.

Pos	Team	Pld	W	D	L	GF	GA	GD	Pts	Promotion or qualification
1	York City (C, P)	46	31	8	7	96	39	+57	101	Promotion to the Third Division
2	Doncaster Rovers (P)	46	24	13	9	82	54	+28	85	Promotion to the Third Division
3	Reading (P)	46	22	16	8	84	56	+28	82	Promotion to the Third Division
4	Bristol City (P)	46	24	10	12	70	44	+26	82	Promotion to the Third Division
5	Aldershot	46	22	9	15	76	69	+7	75	
6	Blackpool	46	21	9	16	70	52	+18	72	
7	Peterborough United	46	18	14	14	72	48	+24	68	
8	Colchester United	46	17	16	13	69	53	+16	67	
9	Torquay United	46	18	13	15	59	64	−5	67	
10	Tranmere Rovers	46	17	15	14	53	53	0	66	
11	Hereford United	46	16	15	15	54	53	+1	63	
12	Stockport County	46	17	11	18	60	64	−4	62	
13	Chesterfield	46	15	15	16	59	61	−2	60	
14	Darlington	46	17	8	21	49	50	−1	59	
15	Bury	46	15	14	17	61	64	−3	59	
16	Crewe Alexandra	46	16	11	19	56	67	−11	59	
17	Swindon Town	46	15	13	18	58	56	+2	58	
18	Northampton Town	46	13	14	19	53	78	−25	53	
19	Mansfield Town	46	13	13	20	66	70	−4	52	
20	Wrexham	46	11	15	20	59	74	−15	48	Qualification for the European Cup Winners' Cup first round (Note: Wrexham lost the Welsh Cup final to Shrewsbury Town, but since Shrewsbury are an English side, Wrexham went on to represent Wales in the European Cup Winners' Cup.)
21	Halifax Town	46	12	12	22	55	89	−34	48	Re-elected
22	Rochdale	46	11	13	22	52	80	−28	46	Re-elected
23	Hartlepool United	46	10	10	26	47	85	−38	40	Re-elected
24	Chester City	46	7	13	26	45	82	−37	34	Re-elected

(C) Champions; (P) Promoted

=== Top goalscorers ===
First Division

- Ian Rush (Liverpool) – 32 goals

Second Division

- Kerry Dixon (Chelsea) – 28 goals

Third Division

- Keith Edwards (Sheffield United) – 33 goals

Fourth Division

- Trevor Senior (Reading) – 36 goals

== Non-league football ==
The divisional champions of the major non-League competitions were:

Competition	Winners
Alliance Premier League	Maidstone United
Isthmian League	Harrow Borough
Northern Premier League	Barrow
Southern League	Dartford
FA Trophy	Northwich Victoria
FA Vase	Stansted

== Star players ==
- Luton Town's promising young striker Paul Walsh was voted PFA Young Player of the Year, and would soon join Liverpool to team up with Ian Rush – who had been voted both PFA Players' Player of the Year and FWA Footballer of the Year.
- Also hitting the headlines were Watford winger John Barnes, Manchester United midfielder Bryan Robson and Everton midfielder Peter Reid.
- Retiring striker Kevin Keegan ended his playing career on a high as he helped Newcastle United gain promotion to the First Division.

== Star managers ==
- Joe Fagan became the first manager to lead an English club to three major trophies in the same season as he ended his first season as Liverpool manager as league champions, League Cup winners and European Cup winners.
- Howard Kendall won his first major trophy as Everton manager in shape of the FA Cup.
- Keith Burkinshaw resigned from Tottenham at the end of the season but ended his time at the club on a high note by winning the UEFA Cup.
- Lawrie McMenemy guided Southampton to their highest-ever league finish – runners-up in the First Division.
- John Neal guided Chelsea to the Second Division championship with a new-look side, having helped the club narrowly avoid relegation to the Third Division a year earlier.
- Howard Wilkinson brought First Division football back to Sheffield Wednesday just a few seasons after they had narrowly avoided relegation to the Fourth Division.
- Arthur Cox helped Newcastle United return to the First Division before suddenly quitting and moving to fallen giants Derby County in hope of reversing their sharp decline.
- Jim Smith took Oxford United to title glory in the Third Division.
- Dennis Smith took York City to the Fourth Division championship.
- Dave Bassett took Wimbledon into the Second Division in only their seventh season as a Football League club.

== Famous debutants ==
29 August 1983: Mark Bowen, 19-year-old defender, makes his debut for Tottenham Hotspur in 1–1 draw with Coventry City at White Hart Lane.

12 October 1983: Stuart Pearce, 21-year-old defender, makes his debut for Coventry City in 2–1 win over Queen's Park Rangers at Highfield Road after signing from non-league Wealdstone.

5 November 1983: Tony Adams, 17-year-old defender, makes his debut for Arsenal in a 2–1 home defeat against Sunderland, a month after his 17th birthday.

13 January 1984: Graeme Hogg, 19-year-old defender, makes his debut for Manchester United in 1–1 draw with Queen's Park Rangers at Loftus Road.

16 May 1984: Clayton Blackmore, 19-year-old winger/defender, makes his debut for Manchester United in 2–0 defeat by Nottingham Forest at the City Ground.

== Deaths ==
- 31 October 1983: George Smith, 68, played 125 league games at centre-half for Charlton Athletic, Brentford, QPR and Ipswich Town between 1938 and 1950. He was capped once for England and after retirement had spells as manager of four different non-league clubs before serving in the Football League in charge of Crystal Palace and finally a nine-year spell at Portsmouth which ended in 1970. He died at Bodmin, Cornwall.
- 5 December 1983: Les Talbot, 73, played for Blackburn Rovers and Cardiff City in the 1930s and finished his playing career in 1947 at Walsall. He then moved to the Netherlands where he managed seven clubs between 1949 and 1972, and stayed there until his death.
- 10 February 1984: Tommy Briggs, 60, scored 256 Football League goals in a 12-year career which began in 1946 and took him from Grimsby Town to Coventry City, and then to Birmingham City and Blackburn Rovers before he completed his playing career back at Grimsby.
- 4 April 1984: Frank Mitchell, 61, who was born in Australia but spent his whole playing career in England, made 361 Football League appearances between 1946 and 1958 for Birmingham City, Chelsea and Watford.
- 23 April 1984: Harry Hibbs, 77, kept goal for England 25 times between 1924 and 1939 and also played 358 times for Birmingham City in the Football League. He later managed Walsall for seven years.
- 13 June 1984: Ken Armstrong, 60, wing-half from Chelsea 1955 league title winning team, died in New Zealand, where he had coached the national side for two spells between 1958 and 1980.
- 18 June 1984: Arthur Chandler, 88, was Leicester City's all-time leading goalscorer, finding the net 259 times in the league and 273 in all competitions between 1923 and 1935. He also scored a further 16 league goals for his first club QPR and six for his last club Notts County.
