= Peter Dougall =

Scottish footballer

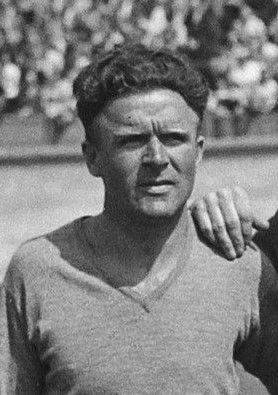
- Dougall in 1947

Personal information
- Date of birth: 21 March 1909
- Place of birth: Denny, Scotland
- Date of death: 12 June 1974 (aged 65)
- Place of death: Denny, Scotland
- Position: Inside left

Youth career
- Dunipace

Senior career*
Years	Team	Apps	(Gls)
1926–1929	Burnley	6	(2)
1929	Clyde	12	(2)
1929–1932	Southampton	29	(5)
1932–1933	Sète		
1933–1937	Arsenal	21	(4)
1937–1938	Everton	11	(2)
1938–1940	Bury	16	(2)

Managerial career
- 1946–1948: AFC Amsterdam
- 1948–????: DHC Delft
- * Club domestic league appearances and goals

Peter Dougall (21 March 1909 – 12 June 1974) was a Scottish footballer who played at inside left for various clubs in the 1920s and 1930s. He later managed in the Netherlands.

== Football career ==
Dougall was born in Denny, Stirlingshire and played for Dunipace as a youth before moving to England to join Burnley of the Football League First Division in October 1926, aged 17 (his brother Billy had joined the Clarets around six months earlier). He broke into the first team in the following season when he replaced the well-established inside left Joe Devine for six matches, scoring twice. With Devine the first-choice for the No. 10 shirt, Dougall spent most of his time at Turf Moor in the reserves, and in February 1929 he returned to Scotland to join Clyde.

In September 1929, Dougall was signed by Southampton, with his transfer fee being met by the Saints Supporters Club. Described in the local press as "in the Alex James class", Dougall was able to combine skill with the ability to "beat a man on a sixpence", although he did have a tendency to over-elaborate. He made his debut for the Saints on 19 October 1929, when he replaced Herbert Coates in a 4–0 defeat at Stoke City. Coates returned for the next match and Dougall's appearances were initially limited until March, when he had a run of seven games. In 1930–31, Dougall was again used as cover for Coates or Laurie Cumming, before taking over from Cumming in February 1931 for the remainder of the season.

For the 1931–32 season, Arthur Wilson was new manager George Kay's preference at inside-left and Dougall only made three further appearances for Southampton, before he was transfer-listed at a fee of £500.

After spending a season in the south of France with Sète, Dougall returned to the English First Division when he joined Arsenal in September 1933. He made his first-team debut in February 1934. Dougall was never a regular at Highbury, making only 23 appearances in four years – he made only five and eight league appearances respectively in the title-winning campaigns of 1933–34 and 1934–35 and it is unclear if he would have been given a medal, and did not play in the 1936 FA Cup final nor in any of the three FA Charity Shield matches arising from these successes. His role was mainly to fill in for Alex James with whom he had been compared so favourably four years earlier (although Bob John, Cliff Bastin and Bobby Davidson also took James's place at various times) and he then missed all of the 1936–37 season, which brought another championship for the Gunners, due to injury.

A transfer to Everton followed in August 1937. Dougall made 11 appearances for the Toffees, before dropping down to the Second Division to join Bury in June 1938. His professional career was then effectively ended by the Second World War, during the early part of which he guested for Manchester United.

His elder brother Billy (a teammate at Burnley), younger brother Jimmy and nephew Neil were all footballers. Jimmy and Neil were both selected for Scotland, each gaining one full cap and appearing in wartime matches.
