= Billy Dougall =

Scottish footballer and manager

Personal information
- Full name: William Dougall
- Date of birth: 25 October 1895
- Place of birth: Denny, Scotland
- Date of death: 15 November 1966 (aged 71)
- Place of death: Burnley, England
- Position: Left half

Senior career*
Years	Team	Apps	(Gls)
–1921	Denny Hibernian		
1921–1926	Falkirk	195	(17)
1926–1929	Burnley	60	(1)

International career
1923	Scottish League XI	1	(0)

Managerial career
- 1957–1958: Burnley
- * Club domestic league appearances and goals

William Dougall (25 October 1895 – 15 November 1966) was a Scottish association football player and manager. He played as a left half. He spent the majority of his playing career with Falkirk and Burnley. A qualified physiotherapist, Dougall later coached at a number of clubs and was appointed manager of Burnley in 1957. However, he held the position for only seven months before he was forced to retire through ill health.

== Playing career ==
Dougall was born in Denny, Stirlingshire in 1895. In his teens he worked as a miner and was signed by local Junior club Denny Hibernian. He played for the club until 1921 when he transferred to senior club Falkirk. He spent five years with Falkirk, being selected for the Scottish Football League XI in 1923, before his performances earned him a £3,000 transfer to Football League First Division side Burnley. He made his debut for the Clarets on 27 February 1926 in the 1–1 draw with Everton and went on to play 60 league matches for the Turf Moor club over the next three seasons. His career was abruptly ended when he seriously injured his knee cartilage in the game against Leicester City on 25 December 1928. He failed to recover from the injury and retired from professional football in early 1929.

== After playing ==
After studying physiotherapy, Dougall was appointed as a coach at Football League Third Division South outfit Thames before moving to Charlton Athletic to become the assistant manager. In 1932 he returned to Burnley as the reserve team coach and went on to succeed Charlie Bates as first team coach two years later. Following the resignation of manager Tom Bromilow in 1935, Dougall was part of a selection committee that managed Burnley for four seasons until football in England was suspended due to the outbreak of the Second World War. In 1938, Dougall was appointed official schools coach by the Lancashire County Football Association. He continued to coach at Burnley and was described by club chairman Bob Lord as a "jewel", stating that Dougall and reserve team manager Ray Bennion were "the finest servants a football club could have".

At the age of 61, Dougall was offered to take over the manager's post from Alan Brown in July 1957. His first game in charge of Burnley was the 0–0 draw away at Portsmouth on 24 August 1957. He got his first win three days later as his side defeated local Lancashire rivals Preston North End 2–0 at Turf Moor. Soon after, he suffered ill health and control of the first team was passed to Ray Bennion while Dougall underwent hospital treatment. He was forced to relinquish his position as manager in January 1958 on medical advice, and was immediately appointed as Burnley's physiotherapist. He held the post for seven years before announcing his retirement at the end of the 1964–65 season.

== Personal life ==
Dougall lived in England for three years following his move to Burnley, but returned to Scotland in 1929 to study physiotherapy in Glasgow. He moved to London the following year and lived in England for the rest of his life. He died in his home in Burnley on 15 November 1966.

His brothers Peter (14 years younger and a teammate at Burnley) and Jimmy (18 years younger) and his son Neil were also footballers; Jimmy too played for Falkirk though mainly for Preston North End; Neil was developed at Burnley while his father was on the staff, but played league football with Birmingham City and Plymouth Argyle. Both were selected for Scotland, each gaining one full cap and appearing in wartime matches.
