= Hugh Evans (footballer) =

Welsh footballer

Personal information
- Full name: Gwilym Hugh Evans
- Date of birth: 12 December 1919
- Place of birth: Ynysybwl, Wales
- Date of death: 3 February 2010 (aged 90)
- Place of death: Wickford, Essex, England
- Position: Inside forward

Senior career*
| Years | Team | Apps | (Gls) |
- Redditch Town
| 1947–1950 | Birmingham City | 11 | (0) |
| 1950–1951 | Bournemouth & Boscombe Athletic | 22 | (8) |
| 1951–1952 | Walsall | 36 | (12) |
| 1952–1954 | Watford | 7 | (2) |
| 1954–19?? | Bedford Town | | |
| – | Hitchin Town | | |
- * Club domestic league appearances and goals

Gwilym Hugh Evans (12 December 1919 – 3 February 2010) was a Welsh professional footballer who scored 22 goals in 76 appearances in the Football League playing for Birmingham City, Bournemouth & Boscombe Athletic, Walsall and Watford.

Evans was born in Ynysybwl, now in Rhondda Cynon Taff, Wales, and brought up in Luton, Bedfordshire, England. He was noticed by Birmingham City while he was serving in the Army, and signed for the club in December 1947. An inside forward, Evans made his debut in the First Division on 22 January 1949, deputising for Jackie Stewart in a goalless draw at Preston North End. His hard work did not make up for insufficient ability to play at the top level, and he joined Bournemouth & Boscombe Athletic of the Third Division South in 1950. He scored 8 goals in 22 league games for Bournemouth, and a year later moved to Walsall, where his 12 goals in 36 league games made him their joint leading scorer in the 1951–52 season. For the following season he signed for his third Division Three South club, Watford, then finished off his career playing non-league football for Bedford Town and Hitchin Town. After retiring from the game he became a grocer in Luton.
