= Jimmy Dougal =

Scottish footballer

Personal information
- Full name: James Dougal
- Date of birth: 3 October 1913
- Place of birth: Denny, Scotland
- Date of death: 17 October 1999 (aged 86)
- Place of death: Walton-on-Thames, England
- Height: 5 ft 8 in (1.73 m)
- Position: Inside forward

Senior career*
Years	Team	Apps	(Gls)
- Kilsyth Rangers
1932–1933	Falkirk	38	(15)
1933–1946	Preston North End	171	(51)
1946–1948	Carlisle United	70	(15)
1948–1949	Halifax Town	22	(2)
- Chorley
Total		301	(83)

International career
1939	Scotland	1	(1)
1940	Scotland (wartime)	1	(1)
- * Club domestic league appearances and goals

James Dougal (3 October 1913 – 17 October 1999) was a Scottish footballer who played as an inside forward for Kilsyth Rangers, Falkirk, Preston North End, Carlisle United, Halifax Town and Chorley, either side of World War II.

He featured on the losing side (playing at outside right) in the 1937 FA Cup Final with Preston – where there was a large contingent of Scottish players in the period – but did not take part the following year when the Lilywhites claimed the trophy due to injury. He was the club's top goalscorer in the 1938–39 season, and won the Football League War Cup in 1941.

He represented Scotland once, scoring his side's goal in a 2–1 defeat to England in April 1939. He also scored in an unofficial wartime International, also against England, in May 1940.

His brothers Billy (18 years older) and Peter and nephew Neil were also footballers, the latter playing for Scotland six years after Jimmy.

== Honours ==
Preston North End

- FA Cup runner-up: 1936–37

== See also ==
- List of Scottish football families
- List of Scotland national football team captains
- List of Scotland wartime international footballers
