= Sid Stanton =

English footballer

Personal information
- Full name: Sidney Horley Stanton
- Date of birth: 16 June 1923
- Place of birth: Dudley, England
- Date of death: 20 February 2005 (aged 81)
- Place of death: Dudley, England
- Positions: Defender; wing half

Senior career*
Years	Team	Apps	(Gls)
–	Birmingham City	0	(0)
194?–1949	Northampton Town	7	(0)
1949–1951	Headington United	48	(1)
- * Club domestic league appearances and goals

Sidney Horley Stanton (16 June 1923 – 20 February 2005) was an English professional footballer who played in the Football League for Northampton Town. He played as a defender or wing half.

Stanton was born in Dudley, which was then part of Worcestershire, in 1923. He began his football career with Birmingham City, and played in the various wartime competitions during the Second World War, but made no first-team appearances once competitive football resumed after the war. He moved on to Northampton Town, where he made seven appearances in the Third Division South between 1947 and 1949. In 1949 he joined Headington United, newly admitted to the Southern League, where he spent two seasons, making 51 appearances in all first-team competitions. Stanton died in 2005.
