= Wally Quinton =

English footballer

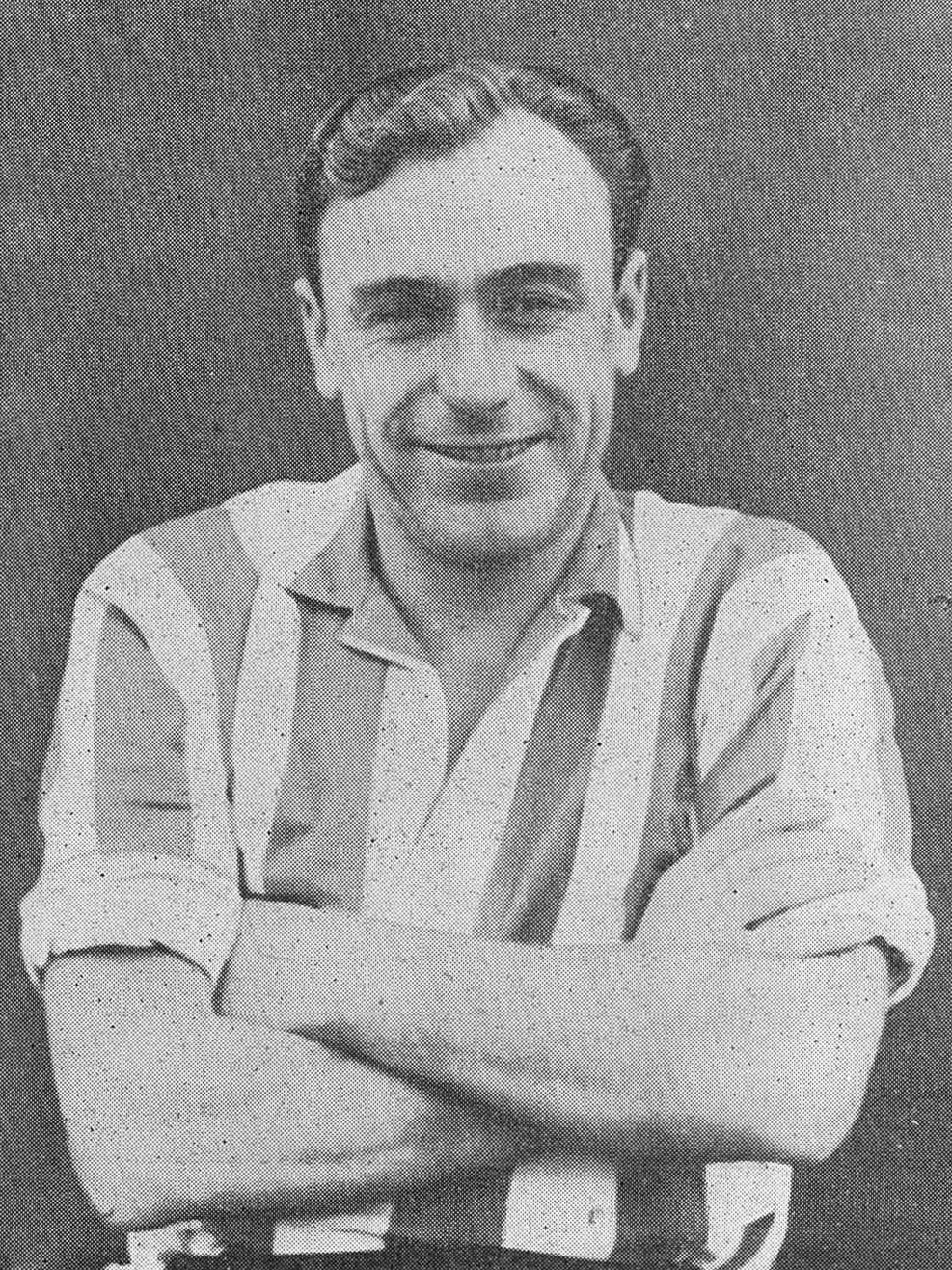
- Quinton while with Brentford in 1949

Personal information
- Full name: Walter Quinton
- Date of birth: 13 December 1917
- Place of birth: North Anston, England
- Date of death: 8 March 1996 (aged 78)
- Place of death: Sheffield, England
- Position: Full back

Senior career*
Years	Team	Apps	(Gls)
1934–1937	Dinnington Athletic		
1937–1939	Rotherham United	32	(0)
1939–1949	Birmingham City	8	(0)
1949–1952	Brentford	42	(0)
1952–19??	Shrewsbury Town	3	(0)
- Snowdown Colliery Welfare
- * Club domestic league appearances and goals

Walter Quinton (13 December 1917 – 8 March 1996) was an English professional footballer who made 85 appearances in the Football League playing for Rotherham United, Birmingham City, Brentford and Shrewsbury Town.

== Career ==
Quinton was born in Anston, which was then in the West Riding of Yorkshire. He played local football for Dinnington Athletic before joining Rotherham United of the Football League Third Division North in July 1938. Described as "an accomplished right back", Quinton made his debut on 8 October 1938 and played in every game but one for the rest of the 1938–39 season.

In the 1939 close season, he signed for Birmingham, newly relegated to the Second Division, but the suspension of competitive football for the duration of the Second World War prevented him proving himself at the higher level. A short, stocky defender, he played more than 100 games for Birmingham in the wartime leagues, but his only appearances in the Football League came as a run of eight games early in the 1947–48 season; Ken Green took over the right-back position as soon as he was demobbed.

Together with Jackie Goodwin, Quinton joined Brentford in a £7000 deal in April 1949. He had one season in the first team before dropping to the reserves, then, after a trial with Southend United in August 1952, he finished off his league career with a few games for Shrewsbury Town. He later played for Snowdown Colliery Welfare of the Kent League.

After retiring from play, Quinton moved back to Birmingham, where he worked for electrical goods manufacturers Bulpitt & Sons. Quinton died at Sheffield in 1996, aged 78.
