= Jimmy Briscoe =

English footballer

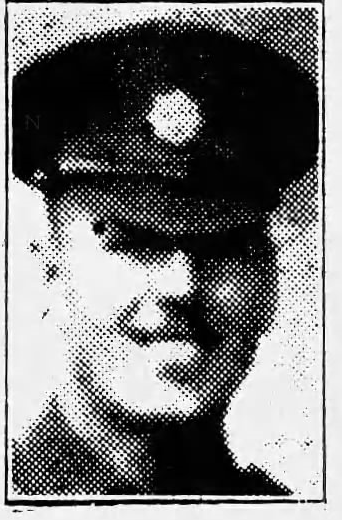
- Briscoe in the 1940s

Personal information
- Full name: James Briscoe
- Date of birth: 25 January 1914
- Place of birth: Skelmersdale, England
- Date of death: 10 June 1944 (aged 30)
- Place of death: Montefiascone, Fascist Italy
- Height: 5 ft 10 in (1.78 m)
- Position: Full back

Senior career*
Years	Team	Apps	(Gls)
1933	Skelmersdale Shoe Company		
1934	Skelmersdale United		
1936–1938	Southport	3	(0)
1938	Skelmersdale United		
- * Club domestic league appearances and goals

James Briscoe (25 January 1914 – 10 June 1944) was an English professional footballer who played as a full back in the Football League for Southport.

== Personal life ==
Briscoe served as a guardsman in the Coldstream Guards during the Second World War and was killed in Italy while serving with the 2nd Battalion, Coldstream Guards, part of the 6th Armoured Division, on 10 June 1944. He is buried at Bolsena War Cemetery.

== Career statistics ==
Appearances and goals by club, season and competition
Club	Season	League			FA Cup		Total	
Club	Season	Division	Apps	Goals	Apps	Goals	Apps	Goals
Southport	1937	Liverpool Senior Cup	1	0	0	0	1	0
Southport	1937–38	Third Division North	2	0	0	0	2	0
Career total			3	0	0	0	3	0
