= Doug Pimbley =

English footballer

Personal information
- Full name: Douglas William Pimbley
- Date of birth: 19 June 1917
- Place of birth: Birmingham, England
- Date of death: 1988 (aged 70–71)
- Position: Forward

Senior career*
Years	Team	Apps	(Gls)
–	Stourbridge		
–	Leicester City	0	(0)
1946–1948	Birmingham City	2	(0)
1948–1950	Notts County	23	(1)
1950–19??	Hereford United		
- * Club domestic league appearances and goals

Douglas William Pimbley (19 June 1917 – 1988) was an English professional footballer who played in the Football League for Birmingham City and Notts County. He played as a forward.

Pimbley was born in the Kings Norton district of Birmingham. He had played for Stourbridge, was on Leicester City's books as an amateur, and served abroad in the Army for four and a half years, before joining Birmingham City in July 1946. A physically powerful player, he appeared only twice for Birmingham's first team. His debut came on 7 April 1947, deputising for George Edwards at outside left in a 2–0 home win against Newcastle United in the Second Division. He moved on to Notts County, for whom he played 23 league games, one of which was County's all-time record league win, 11–1 against Newport County in January 1949; Pimbley, playing at inside left, was involved in several of the goals but failed to get on the scoresheet himself.
