= Huntingdonshire Football Association =

- Huntingdonshire FA logo
- Purpose: Football association
- Location: Huntingdon
- Coordinates: 52.331483°N 0.187758°E
- Secretary: Mark Frost
- Website: http://www.huntsfa.com/

The Huntingdonshire Football Association, also simply known as the Huntingdonshire FA, is the governing body of football in Huntingdonshire.
