= Fred Hall (footballer, born 1924) =

English footballer (1924–2006)

Personal information
- Full name: Frederick Hall
- Date of birth: 24 November 1924
- Place of birth: Worksop, England
- Date of death: April 2006 (aged 81)
- Position: Centre forward

Senior career*
Years	Team	Apps	(Gls)
- Whitwell OB
1947–1949	Birmingham City	5	(2)
1949–19??	Bedford Town		
19??–1963	Eynesbury Rovers		

Managerial career
- Eynesbury Rovers
- Huntingdonshire FA XI
- * Club domestic league appearances and goals

Frederick Hall (24 November 1924 – April 2006) was an English professional footballer who played in the Football League for Birmingham City. In later life he was President of the Huntingdonshire Football Association.

Hall was born in Worksop, Nottinghamshire. He was working as a coal miner when he signed for Birmingham City in March 1947. A centre forward, Hall scored on his debut in the Second Division on 5 April 1947 in a 2–1 home win against Fulham, and kept his place for the next two games. Not selected again until November 1949, when he also scored, he went on to play for Southern League club Bedford Town and Eynesbury Rovers of the Eastern Counties League.

Hall later managed Eynesbury as well as Huntingdonshire County representative sides. He became a member of the Huntingdonshire Football Association, and was appointed its president in 1991. He died in 2006 after a long illness at the age of 81.
