= Bobby Laing =

Scottish footballer (1925–1985)

Personal information
- Full name: Robert Smith Laing
- Date of birth: 1 February 1925
- Place of birth: Glasgow, Scotland
- Date of death: September 1985 (aged 60)
- Place of death: Birmingham, England
- Height: 5 ft 4 in (1.63 m)
- Position: Outside left

Senior career*
Years	Team	Apps	(Gls)
–	Falkirk	0	(0)
1946–1950	Birmingham City	19	(2)
1950–1952	Watford	60	(8)
1952–195?	Kettering Town		
1955–1956	Worcester City		(8)
–	Halesowen Town		
–	Brierley Hill Alliance		
–	Brush Sports		
- * Club domestic league appearances and goals

Robert Smith Laing (1 February 1925 – September 1985) was a Scottish professional footballer who made 79 appearances in the Football League playing for Birmingham City and Watford.

== Career ==
Laing was born in Glasgow. He had been on the books of Falkirk, but while stationed at Hednesford, Staffordshire, during the Second World War, he appeared for Birmingham City in the wartime Football League South. He made his debut in the Second Division on 14 February 1948, deputising for George Edwards in a home game against Leeds United which Birmingham won 5–1; Laing scored twice, his first goal coming inside the first five minutes. He played more frequently during the 1948–49 season in the First Division, competing with Harold Roberts for the outside left spot after Edwards moved to Cardiff City, but at the start of the next season the club switched Johnny Berry to the left wing, and Laing returned to the reserves.

In June 1950, he joined Watford of the Third Division South, where he had two years of regular first-team football. He then moved into non-league football with Kettering Town of the Southern League, where he scored 10 goals from 42 appearances, and later played for Worcester City, Halesowen Town, Brierley Hill Alliance and Brush Sports. He retired from the game in 1957.

Laing died in Birmingham in 1985, at the age of 60.
