= Harold Roberts (footballer) =

English footballer (1920–2007)

Personal information
- Full name: Harold Roberts
- Date of birth: 12 January 1920
- Place of birth: Liverpool, England
- Date of death: 11 February 2007 (aged 87)
- Place of death: Chesterfield, England
- Height: 5 ft 9 in (1.75 m)
- Position: Outside left

Youth career
- Everton

Senior career*
Years	Team	Apps	(Gls)
193?–1939	Harrowby		
1939–1948	Chesterfield	92	(9)
1948–1951	Birmingham City	34	(2)
1951–1953	Shrewsbury Town	70	(16)
1953–195?	Scunthorpe United	17	(1)
1955–1956	Matlock Town		
1956–1957	Gresley Rovers		
1957–19??	Burton Albion		
- * Club domestic league appearances and goals

Harold Roberts (12 January 1920 – 11 February 2007), also known as Harry Roberts, was an English professional footballer who made 213 appearances in the Football League playing for Chesterfield, Birmingham City, Shrewsbury Town and Scunthorpe United. He played as an outside left.

== Career ==
Roberts was born in Liverpool. As a 16-year-old he spent a season with Everton, and then played for Harrowby. He joined Chesterfield in September 1939, just before the Football League was suspended for the duration of the Second World War. During the war, Roberts served with No. 2 Commando. He was wounded in the legs and captured during Operation Chariot, the raid on the French port of Saint-Nazaire in 1942, and owed the possibility of a football career to the repair work carried out by a German surgeon. Roberts spent 3 1/2 years in a prisoner-of-war camp in Bremen. On his return, he lodged with Chesterfield coach and former England international Joe Spence, whose individual work with Roberts played a major role in his recovery.

He scored on his first-team debut, in the 1945–46 FA Cup at home to York City, and made his Football League debut on 31 August 1946, in the Second Division in a 1–1 draw at home to Bradford Park Avenue. Described as "an outside-left of great distinction, ... skilful, intelligent and, above all, fast, with an excellent pin-point cross", Roberts made 92 league appearances for the club in 2 1/2 years. In November 1948 he moved on to Birmingham City, recently promoted to the First Division, for a fee of £10,600, at the time a record fee received by the Chesterfield club. During his time at Birmingham he suffered a number of injuries which restricted his appearances to 38 in a 2 1/2-year stay. At the end of the 1950–51 season, Roberts joined Shrewsbury Town of the Third Division South, where he played regularly for two seasons before finishing his league career with infrequent outings for Scunthorpe United over a further two seasons.

Roberts then played non-league football for Matlock Town, Gresley Rovers, for whom he scored 6 goals from 38 games, and Burton Albion, and helped with the coaching of Matlock Town's reserve team as they won the Central Alliance Division Two title and League Cup in the 1959–60 season. During the 1960s Roberts spent eight years as a youth worker at Staveley Chantry youth club, where he established a football team. He then returned to Chesterfield F.C., initially as an assistant youth coach, and remained at the club until 1983, when he was one of several staff dismissed by a new board of directors. He later acted as a scout for Sheffield United and Rotherham United.

Roberts was married to Dorothy and had two sons, one of whom, Peter, also played league football for Chesterfield. Harold Roberts died in hospital in Chesterfield in 2007 at the age of 87.
