= Dave Massart =

English footballer (1919-1993)

Personal information
- Full name: David Louis Massart
- Date of birth: 2 November 1919
- Place of birth: Birmingham, England
- Date of death: December 1993 (age 74)
- Place of death: Weymouth, England
- Position: Centre forward

Senior career*
Years	Team	Apps	(Gls)
193?–1938	Bells Athletic		
1938–1947	Birmingham City	3	(0)
1947–1948	Walsall	27	(23)
1948–1951	Bury	85	(45)
1951	Chesterfield	11	(5)
1951–1956	Weymouth	156	(114)
Total		282	(187)
- * Club domestic league appearances and goals

David Louis Massart (2 November 1919 – 1993) was an English professional footballer who scored 73 goals in 126 appearances in the Football League playing for Birmingham City, Walsall, Bury and Chesterfield. He played as a centre forward.

== Career ==
Massart was born in the Yardley district of Birmingham. He joined hometown club Birmingham as an amateur in 1938, and turned professional in February 1939, but had not played for the first team when the outbreak of the Second World War put a stop to the Football League. He played intermittently in the later years of wartime competition, contributing 9 goals from 11 games as Birmingham won the Football League South in the 1945–46 season, and finally made his debut in the Second Division on 7 September 1946 in a 2–0 home defeat to Burnley. Described as "a real old-fashioned number nine", Massart scored freely for the reserves but was unable to establish himself in the first team.

In the 1947 close season, Massart joined up with former Birmingham clubmate Harry Hibbs, then manager of Third Division South club Walsall. He made a spectacular start to his Walsall career, scoring a hat-trick in each of the first three home games. He finished up with 23 goals from 27 league games, which made him Walsall's leading scorer for 1947–48, despite moving back to the Second Division with Bury in March 1948, well before the end of the season.

Bury paid £2,000 for Massart's services. He repaid their investment by scoring 45 goals in 85 league games for the club, becoming their leading scorer for two consecutive seasons. After three years he moved to his last Football League club; Chesterfield paid £6,000 for his services in February 1951 in the hope that his goalscoring might save them from relegation from the Second Division. Five goals from 11 games was too little too late, and Massart moved into non-League football with Weymouth before the 1951–52 season.

He continued in prolific vein at Weymouth. In five seasons he scored 114 goals in 156 games in the Southern League, one of only three Weymouth players to achieve 100 career goals in that competition, and he twice scored hat-tricks in consecutive matches. In his final season, the club organised a benefit match for him against a Football Association Guest XI; 7,000 spectators turned up, far in excess of the usual home attendance.

Massart retired from the game in 1956. He remained in Weymouth, Dorset, where he ran a post office and then a hotel. He died in the town in December 1993 at the age of 74.
