= Jock Mulraney =

Scottish footballer

Personal information
- Full name: Ambrose Aloysius Mulraney
- Date of birth: 18 May 1916
- Place of birth: Wishaw, Scotland
- Date of death: 8 December 2001 (aged 85)
- Place of death: Kinver, England
- Height: 5 ft 7 in (1.70 m)
- Position: Outside right

Youth career
- Wishaw White Rose
- Carluke Rovers

Senior career*
Years	Team	Apps	(Gls)
1933–1935	Celtic	0	(0)
1935–1936	Dartford		
1936–1945	Ipswich Town	60	(18)
1945–1947	Birmingham City	27	(8)
1947–1948	Shrewsbury Town		
1948	Kidderminster Harriers		(0)
1948–1949	Aston Villa	12	(2)
1949–1952	Cradley Heath		

Managerial career
- 1949–1952: Cradley Heath (player-manager)
- 1952–1953: Brierley Hill Alliance
- * Club domestic league appearances and goals

Ambrose Aloysius "Jock" Mulraney (18 May 1916 – 8 December 2001) was a Scottish professional footballer, who played as an outside right. He played for Ipswich Town in their first season in the Football League, for Birmingham City in wartime football and in the Football League Second Division, and for Aston Villa in the top flight.

== Biography ==
Mulraney was born in Wishaw, North Lanarkshire. He was a small man of slight build, with considerable pace and trickery, whose preferred position was outside right, but he was also capable of playing on the left wing. He began his football career with junior clubs Wishaw White Rose and Carluke Rovers, and had a trial for Scotland schoolboys, before joining Celtic in 1933. Unable to break into the first team at Celtic, he had trials at a variety of clubs both within Scotland and outside it before moving to England to join Southern League Dartford in 1935.

A year later he moved to Ipswich Town, then also in the Southern League, and helped them win the 1936–37 championship. The following season Ipswich finished third in the Southern League and successfully applied for election to the Football League, where they were placed in the Third Division South. Mulraney was only able to play one full league season for Ipswich before the Second World War intervened. He scored their first ever away goal in the Football League, the only goal of the game at Walsall in August 1938, and their first ever Football League hat-trick, in the 4–0 win over Bristol City on 8 April 1939.

Mulraney served in the Royal Air Force during the war as a PT Instructor, reaching the rank of Flight Sergeant. His military service did not prevent him playing in the wartime football competitions, in which he made guest appearances for no fewer than twelve clubs. From the 1943–44 season onwards he was able to play regularly for Birmingham City, for whom he scored 41 goals in 118 appearances in wartime football. On demobilisation from the RAF in October 1945, he joined the club permanently for a fee of £3,750. That season he contributed to the club winning the championship of the Football League South and scored seven goals in their run to the semi-final of the first post-war FA Cup.

In July 1947 he joined Shrewsbury Town, with whom he won a Midland League championship medal, and a year later joined Southern League Kidderminster Harriers. Two months later, in September 1948, he signed for First Division Aston Villa, where he ended his Football League career. He then tried his hand at management with Cradley Heath in the Birmingham & District League, where he had three years as player-manager, and in 1952 with Birmingham & District League champions Brierley Hill Alliance.

Mulraney suffered a heart attack in 1968 from which he recovered. He settled in Kinver, Staffordshire, where he died in December 2001.

== Honours ==
- with Ipswich Town
  - Southern League champions 1937.
  - Election to the Football League 1938.
- with Birmingham City
  - Football League South champions 1946.
- with Shrewsbury Town
  - Midland League champions 1948.
