= Jackie Stewart (footballer, born 1921) =

Scottish footballer

Personal information
- Full name: John Gebbie Stewart
- Date of birth: 4 September 1921
- Place of birth: Lochgelly, Scotland
- Date of death: 17 May 1990 (aged 68)
- Place of death: Kirkcaldy, Scotland
- Height: 5 ft 5 in (1.65 m)
- Position: Outside right

Youth career
- Lochgelly Welfare
- Donibristle YC

Senior career*
| Years | Team | Apps | (Gls) |
| 1939–1948 | Raith Rovers | 44 | (21) |
| 1948–1955 | Birmingham City | 203 | (52) |
| 1955 | Raith Rovers | 6 | (0) |
| Total | | 253 | (73) |
- * Club domestic league appearances and goals

John Gebbie Stewart (4 September 1921 – 17 May 1990) was a Scottish professional footballer who played as an outside right for Raith Rovers and Birmingham City.

A former miner born in Lochgelly, Fife, Stewart started his professional career at Raith Rovers, and moved to Birmingham City in January 1948. He had pace and a direct style, and in his first full season at the club, 1948–49, finished as leading goalscorer with 11 league goals for the newly promoted side struggling in the top flight. Injury disrupted his last couple of seasons at Birmingham, and he returned to Raith in 1955 having made 218 appearances in all competitions with 55 goals. He was appointed trainer at Raith and remained in football until 1963.

== Honours ==
=== As a player ===
Birmingham City

- Football League Second Division: 1947–48

=== As an individual ===
- Raith Rovers Hall of Fame
