= John Hughes (footballer, born 1921) =

English footballer

Personal information
- Full name: John Norman Hughes
- Date of birth: 10 July 1921
- Place of birth: Tamworth, England
- Date of death: 31 August 2003 (aged 82)
- Place of death: Lichfield, England
- Position: Outside forward

Senior career*
| Years | Team | Apps | (Gls) |
| –1947 | Tamworth Castle | | |
| 1947–1949 | Birmingham City | 6 | (0) |
| 1949–1952 | Tamworth | | |
| 1952–195? | Atherstone Town | | |
- * Club domestic league appearances and goals

John Norman Hughes (10 July 1921 – 31 August 2003) was an English professional footballer who played in the Football League for Birmingham City.

Born in Tamworth, Staffordshire, Hughes made his name in non-league football during the Second World War. A versatile player, he joined Birmingham City in June 1947, and made his debut on 6 September 1947 in a 2–1 home win against Luton Town in the Second Division. He played twice more that season at outside right, and a further three times at outside left in the 1948–49 First Division season, but then returned to the non-league game with Tamworth and then with Atherstone Town. In 1955 he was appointed assistant manager of Tamworth.
