= Don Dorman =

English footballer (1922–1997)

Personal information
- Full name: Donald Dorman
- Date of birth: 18 September 1922
- Place of birth: Hall Green, Birmingham, England
- Date of death: 12 January 1997 (aged 74)
- Place of death: Worcester, England
- Positions: Inside forward; wing half

Youth career
- Shirley Juniors

Senior career*
Years	Team	Apps	(Gls)
1946–1951	Birmingham City	59	(4)
1951–1954	Coventry City	90	(29)
1954–1957	Walsall	116	(34)
Total		265	(67)

Managerial career
- 1970: Birmingham City (caretaker)
- * Club domestic league appearances and goals

Donald Dorman (18 September 1922 – 12 January 1997) was an English professional footballer who played as an inside forward or wing half. He made 265 appearances in the Football League playing for Birmingham City, Coventry City and Walsall in the years following the Second World War. He later became a scout.

== Life and career ==
Born in Hall Green, Birmingham, Dorman served as a paratrooper in the 1st Airborne Division during the Second World War. He was wounded and captured at Arnhem and made a prisoner of war. After the war he signed a professional contract with Birmingham City in 1946. He remained at the club for five years, and then joined Coventry City in an exchange deal for Tommy Briggs. At Coventry Dorman scored at a rate of a goal every three games. In 1954 he signed for Walsall, and was their leading scorer in 1956–57, the final season of his playing career.

Dorman then rejoined Birmingham as a scout, and became chief scout when Walter Taylor died. He was responsible for bringing to the club a number of young players who went on to very successful careers, including Kenny Burns, Trevor Francis, Bob and Dave Latchford, Malcolm Page and Garry Pendrey. He and coach Bill Shorthouse acted as caretaker managers at the end of the 1969–70 season while the club sought a replacement after Stan Cullis retired. Dorman left Birmingham when Ron Saunders arrived as manager and took up the post of chief scout at Aston Villa. He died in Worcester in 1997 aged 74.
