= Neil Dougall =

Scottish footballer

Personal information
- Full name: Cornelius Dougall
- Date of birth: 7 November 1921
- Place of birth: Falkirk, Scotland
- Date of death: 1 December 2009 (aged 88)
- Place of death: Plymouth, England
- Height: 5 ft 10 in (1.78 m)
- Positions: Inside right; wing half

Youth career
- 1936–1940: Burnley

Senior career*
Years	Team	Apps	(Gls)
1940–1945	Burnley	0	(0)
1945–1949	Birmingham City	93	(15)
1949–1959	Plymouth Argyle	275	(26)
Total		368	(41)

International career
1946	Scotland (wartime)	1	(0)
1946	Scotland (unofficial)	1	(0)
1946	Scotland	1	(0)

Managerial career
- 1961: Plymouth Argyle
- * Club domestic league appearances and goals

Cornelius Dougall (7 November 1921 – 1 December 2009) was a Scottish professional footballer who played as an inside right or wing half. He played more than 350 games in the Football League for Birmingham City and Plymouth Argyle, and won one cap for Scotland in 1946.

== Life and career ==
Dougall was born in Falkirk, Scotland. He began his football career as a schoolboy inside right at Burnley in 1936. He turned professional in 1940. After the Second World War he moved to Birmingham City for a fee of £2,750. He helped the club win that season's Football League South war league championship and the Second Division title two years later. While a Birmingham player, he won one full cap for Scotland, against Wales in October 1946. Earlier that year he also represented his country in a Victory international against England and in the Burnden Park disaster fundraising match, in which he played opposite his clubmate Frank Mitchell.

He transferred to Plymouth Argyle in March 1949 for a fee of £13,000, was converted to wing half, and spent the remainder of his playing career at the club, making nearly 300 appearances in all competitions, before he retired in March 1959. With Plymouth he won a Third Division South championship medal in 1952 and a Third Division championship medal in 1959. He was awarded a testimonial match against Burnley, the club where he started his career and where his father Billy had been both player and manager (his uncles Peter and Jimmy also played in the 1930s, mainly for Southampton and Preston North End). Neil also qualified as a coach and became player-coach to Plymouth's reserve team, succeeded Jack Rowley as team manager for an eight-month spell, and performed various coaching roles at the club until 1969.

After retiring from football he ran a fitness club in Plymouth from which he retired in 1986. He had Alzheimer's disease and died in Plymouth on 1 December 2009 after a long illness.

== Honours ==
Birmingham City

- Football League South (wartime league): 1945–46
- Football League Second Division: 1947–48

Plymouth Argyle

- Football League Third Division South: 1951–52
- Football League Third Division: 1958–59
