= Cyril Trigg =

English footballer

Personal information
- Date of birth: 8 April 1917
- Place of birth: Measham, England
- Date of death: 9 April 1993 (aged 76)
- Place of death: Birmingham, England
- Height: 5 ft 10 1/2 in (1.79 m)
- Positions: Full back; centre forward

Youth career
- Binley Welfare
- Bedworth Town
- 1935: Birmingham

Senior career*
Years	Team	Apps	(Gls)
1935–1954	Birmingham City	268	(67)
1954–1957	Stourbridge		
- * Club domestic league appearances and goals

Cyril Trigg (8 April 1917 – 9 April 1993) was an English professional footballer who made 268 appearances in the Football League playing for Birmingham, which was renamed Birmingham City in 1943.

Trigg was born in Measham, Leicestershire. He spent the whole of his League career – nineteen years – with Birmingham City, for whom he made 291 appearances and scored 72 goals in all competitions. The Second World War started when he was 22 years old, so his career was severely disrupted by the conflict, in which he served in the Royal Air Force in India and Burma. He also appeared as a guest player for West Ham United during the war. He was twice Birmingham's leading scorer, firstly in the 1946–47 season, despite playing a third of his matches at right back, and again in 1950–51, by which time he was exclusively a centre forward.

He moved to Stourbridge in 1954 as player-coach, and retired in 1957. He died in Birmingham aged 76.

== Honours ==
Birmingham City

- Football League Second Division: 1947–48

== Sources ==
- Matthews, Tony (1995). Birmingham City: A Complete Record. Derby: Breedon Books. ISBN 978-1-85983-010-9.
