= Harold Bodle =

English footballer (1920–2005)

Personal information
- Date of birth: 4 October 1920
- Place of birth: Woodlands, Doncaster, England
- Date of death: 1 January 2005 (aged 84)
- Place of death: Bournemouth, England
- Height: 5 ft 10 in (1.78 m)
- Positions: Inside left; wing half

Youth career
- Silverwood Colliery
- Ridgehill Athletic

Senior career*
Years	Team	Apps	(Gls)
1938	Rotherham United	9	(0)
1938–1949	Birmingham City	94	(32)
1949–1952	Bury	119	(40)
1952	Betteshanger Colliery Welfare		
1952–1953	Stockport County	29	(6)
1953–1957	Accrington Stanley	94	(13)

Managerial career
- 1952: Betteshanger Colliery Welfare (player-manager)
- 1959–1960: Accrington Stanley
- 1974–1976: Burton Albion
- * Club domestic league appearances and goals

Harold Bodle (4 October 1920 – 1 January 2005) was an English footballer who played as an inside left or wing half. He played for Birmingham City in the top flight and for several clubs in the North of England in the lower divisions of the Football League. He was particularly noted for juggling the ball, a skill he claimed to have perfected as a child by repeatedly kicking a small ball against the sideboard at home.

== Biography ==
Bodle was born in Woodlands, near Doncaster. He played for Doncaster schoolboys before starting work at Silverwood Colliery where he played for the works team. He also played for Ridgehill Athletic and had trials at Doncaster Rovers and Bradford Park Avenue before signing professional forms for Third Division North side Rotherham United in May 1938. His Rotherham career was brief; after nine games in the Football League and just past his 18th birthday Bodle was transferred to First Division club Birmingham for a fee of £2,000. His reaction to the move was quoted thus:

"It was a total surprise when [Rotherham] manager Reg Freeman pulled me aside at the training ground to tell me of The Blues' interest. I was so excited that when I went back to the training session I lost concentration and went sliding off onto the gravel edge. When I met up with Blues officials later that day I had both my hands bandaged and found it hard to sign the contract!"

Bodle played one first-team game for his new club before the outbreak of the Second World War put an end to League football. He made occasional appearances for the club in wartime competition, as well as guesting for Rotherham and Doncaster, for whom he scored 27 goals. He returned to Birmingham to play a full season (and score 16 goals) in the 1945–46 regional competition Football League South, which Birmingham won, and contributed three goals in their run to the FA Cup semifinal. By this time he was a fixture in the side. He scored 16 goals in all competitions in the first post-war League season – only Cyril Trigg got more for Birmingham – and 14 the following year, which made him the club's leading scorer and helped them to promotion back to the top flight. Once in the First Division Bodle's goals stopped coming, and in March 1949 the club accepted an offer for his services of £9,500 from Second Division Bury.

He spent just over three seasons at Bury, in that time playing well over 100 games and scoring 40 League goals, and finished the 1951–52 season as the club's top scorer with 19 goals. When his contract expired at the end of that season, he decided to leave Bury to take up the post of player-manager, coach and trainer at Betteshanger Colliery Welfare of the Kent League. Because he had moved into non-league football, Bury were not entitled to a transfer fee. When a few weeks later Bodle signed for Stockport County for a fee of £7,000, Bury claimed compensation as they still retained his Football League registration. Payment of £1,750 allowed the move to proceed.

Bodle left Stockport at the end of the season, and on 13 August 1953 signed for Accrington Stanley of the Third Division North. By this time he had moved back into midfield to play as a wing half, but even so he scored three goals in his first two games for the club. He captained the side for two years, leading them to runners-up spot in the division in his second season. The Accrington Observer remembers him as "a popular captain with an inspiring personality and an astute tactician". He stayed at the club a further two years, playing less frequently as injury, ill-health and the influx of Scottish players brought in by manager Walter Galbraith took their toll, retiring as a player in May 1957.

Galbraith resigned as Stanley manager in 1958, and Bodle was considered for the job, but the experienced George Eastham was preferred. His tenure was brief, and in June 1959 Bodle was appointed manager. The club had no money, the team had become accustomed to losing, and the spectators stopped coming. The season ended in relegation with a Third Division record number of 123 goals conceded. The directors chose to dismiss Bodle and appoint captain Jimmy Harrower as player-manager in his place, purportedly because the club were unable to afford a non-playing manager. In 1974, after 14 years of running a grocery shop, Bodle returned to football management with Burton Albion. He took them to the semi-final of the FA Trophy in 1975 and resigned in February 1976.

Bodle went on to run a sub-post-office in Derbyshire before retiring to Bournemouth, where he died at the age of 84.

== Honours ==
Birmingham City

- Football League South: 1946
- Second Division: 1948
- Club's top scorer: 1948

Bury

- Club's top scorer: 1952

Accrington Stanley

- Third Division North runners-up: 1955
