= Frank Mitchell (sportsman, born 1922) =

Australian soccer player and cricketer

- Born: Frank Rollason Mitchell; 3 June 1922; Goulburn, New South Wales, Australia
- Died: 2 April 1984 (aged 61); Lapworth, England
Association football career
- Position: Wing half
Youth career
- 1941–1943: Coventry City
Senior career*
Years	Team	Apps	(Gls)
1943–1949	Birmingham City	93	(6)
1949–1952	Chelsea	75	(1)
1952–1958	Watford	193	(0)
- * Club domestic league appearances and goals
- Cricket career

Cricket information
- Batting: Right-handed
- Bowling: Right arm medium/off-break
- Role: Bowler

Domestic team information
- Years: Team
- 1946–1948: Warwickshire

Career statistics
Competition	FC
Matches	17
Runs scored	224
Batting average	8.29
100s/50s	0/0
Top score	43
Balls bowled	1,996
Wickets	22
Bowling average	38.90
5 wickets in innings	0
10 wickets in match	0
Best bowling	4/69
Catches/stumpings	7/0
- Source: ESPNcricinfo, 1 June 2021

Frank Rollason Mitchell (3 June 1922 – 4 April 1984) was an Australian professional soccer player and cricketer. He played over 350 games in the Football League, including 86 in the First Division. He also played county cricket for Warwickshire.

== Cricket career ==
Mitchell was born in Goulburn, New South Wales, Australia, and moved to England when a teenager. His main sport was cricket, and he joined the Warwickshire ground staff at 15.

Mitchell played 17 first-class matches for Warwickshire between 1946 and 1948, taking 22 wickets at an average of 38.9 with his right-arm medium-pace or off-break bowling, making 229 runs at an average of 8.29 and taking seven catches. He played for and became groundsman and secretary of Knowle and Dorridge Cricket Club.

== Football career ==
He began his football career as an amateur with Coventry City, and made guest appearances during the Second World War with several clubs, including Birmingham, who were sufficiently impressed to sign him on professional forms in 1943. He had a calm temperament and became the club's regular penalty-taker. In 1946 he played for an England XI against a Scotland XI in an unofficial friendly international to raise money for the victims of the Burnden Park disaster.

After 106 games for Birmingham he moved to Chelsea in January 1949. He made 85 appearances for Chelsea before in 1952 moving to Watford where he finished his career, playing nearly 200 league games for the club before he retired in 1958.

== Death ==
He died at Lapworth, Warwickshire, aged 61.

== Honours ==
- Birmingham City
  - Football League South (wartime league) champions 1946.
  - Football League Second Division champions 1948.

== Parents ==
Frank Rewi Mitchell (died 1930 - Tamworth, Australia)
Annetta Rollason (died 1972 - Coventry, UK)

== Siblings ==
William (Bill) Mitchell
Elizabeth (Betty) Mitchell
