= 1956–57 Birmingham City F.C. season =

Birmingham City F.C.
1956–57 season
- Chairman: Harry Morris Jr
- Manager: Arthur Turner
- Ground: St Andrew's
- Football League First Division: 12th
- FA Cup: Semi-final (eliminated by Manchester United)
- Inter-Cities Fairs Cup: Semi-final
- Top goalscorer: League: Alex Govan (24); All: Alex Govan (30)
- Highest home attendance: 57,827 vs Nottingham Forest, FA Cup sixth round, 2 March 1957
- Lowest home attendance: 23,747 vs Manchester City, 27 April 1957
- Average home league attendance: 32,444
Home colours

The 1956–57 Football League season was Birmingham City Football Club's 54th in the Football League and their 30th in the First Division. They finished in 12th position in the 22-team division. They entered the 1956–57 FA Cup at the third round proper and lost in the semi-final to Manchester United. In the inaugural edition of the Inter-Cities Fairs Cup, Birmingham finished top of their group so progressed to the semi-final.

Twenty-four players made at least one appearance in nationally organised first-team competition, and there were thirteen different goalscorers. Goalkeeper Gil Merrick played in 49 of the 51 first-team matches over the season, and Alex Govan finished as leading goalscorer with 30 goals in all competitions, of which 24 were scored in the league.

== Football League First Division ==
Date	League position	Opponents	Venue	Result	Score F–A	Scorers	Attendance
18 August 1956	12th	Manchester United	A	D	2–2	Govan, Jones og	32,958
22 August 1956	6th	Portsmouth	H	W	3–1	Astall, Govan 2	33,307
25 August 1956	3rd	Arsenal	H	W	4–2	Brown, Murphy 2, Govan	37,197
29 August 1956	2nd	Portsmouth	A	W	4–3	Govan 3, Astall	25,686
1 September 1956	6th	Burnley	A	L	0–2		25,531
5 September 1956	2nd	Newcastle United	H	W	6–1	Kinsey, Murphy 2, Govan 3	32,506
8 September 1956	2nd	Preston North End	H	W	3–0	Govan 3	44,458
15 September 1956	3rd	Chelsea	A	L	0–1		40,530
22 September 1956	4th	Cardiff City	H	W	2–1	Kinsey, Govan	39,931
29 September 1956	6th	Wolverhampton Wanderers	A	L	0–3		44,191
6 October 1956	6th	Bolton Wanderers	H	D	0–0		29,614
13 October 1956	6th	Leeds United	A	D	1–1	Larkin	34,460
20 October 1956	6th	Luton Town	H	W	3–0	Brown 2, Orritt	31,783
27 October 1956	7th	Aston Villa	A	L	1–3	Astall	54,927
3 November 1956	6th	Blackpool	H	D	2–2	Astall, Govan	35,597
10 November 1956	9th	Manchester City	A	L	1–3	Kinsey	21,005
17 November 1956	6th	Charlton Athletic	H	W	4–2	Brown, Kinsey, Astall, Murphy	27,564
24 November 1956	5th	Sunderland	A	W	1–0	Orritt	33,807
1 December 1956	4th	Tottenham Hotspur	H	D	0–0		38,035
8 December 1956	7th	Everton	A	L	0–2		29,579
15 December 1956	5th	Manchester United	H	W	3–1	Brown 2, Orritt	36,146
22 December 1956	8th	Arsenal	A	L	0–4		28,644
25 December 1956	6th	Sheffield Wednesday	H	W	4–0	Brown, Murphy, Astall, Govan	24,380
29 December 1956	5th	Burnley	H	W	2–0	Brown, Govan	31,733
1 January 1957	6th	Newcastle United	A	L	2–3	Brown, Govan	29,383
12 January 1957	9th	Preston North End	A	L	0–1		19,430
19 January 1957	9th	Chelsea	H	L	0–1		30,157
2 February 1957	8th	Cardiff City	A	W	2–1	Brown, Astall	16,854
9 February 1957	8th	Wolverhampton Wanderers	H	D	2–2	Astall, Govan	45,915
20 February 1957	9th	Bolton Wanderers	A	L	1–3	Astall	11,284
9 March 1957	10th	Everton	H	L	1–3	Brown	23,881
16 March 1957	12th	Blackpool	A	L	1–3	Brown	17,610
30 March 1957	13th	Charlton Athletic	A	L	0–1		17,839
3 April 1957	13th	Luton Town	A	D	0–0		12,881
6 April 1957	13th	Sunderland	H	L	1–2	Brown	24,548
10 April 1957	13th	Aston Villa	H	L	1–2	Murphy	29,853
13 April 1957	14th	Tottenham Hotspur	A	L	1–5	Astall	33,512
20 April 1957	15th	Leeds United	H	W	6–2	Brown 2, Govan 3, Astall	30,642
22 April 1957	14th	West Bromwich Albion	A	D	0–0		18,755
23 April 1957	13th	West Bromwich Albion	H	W	2–0	Kinsey, Govan	30,332
27 April 1957	12th	Manchester City	H	D	3–3	Brown, Govan, Phoenix og	23,747
29 April 1957	12th	Sheffield Wednesday	A	L	0–3		13,845

=== League table (part) ===
Final First Division table (part)
Pos	Club	Pld	W	D	L	F	A	GA	Pts
10th	Aston Villa	42	14	15	13	55	45	1.18	43
11th	West Bromwich Albion	42	14	14	14	59	61	0.97	42
12th	Birmingham City	42	15	9	18	69	69	1.00	39
13th	Chelsea	42	13	13	16	73	73	1.00	39
14th	Sheffield Wednesday	42	16	6	20	82	88	0.93	38
Key	Pos = League position; Pld = Matches played; W = Matches won; D = Matches drawn; L = Matches lost; F = Goals for; A = Goals against; GA = Goal average; Pts = Points								
Source									

== FA Cup ==
Round	Date	Opponents	Venue	Result	Score F–A	Scorers	Attendance
Third round	5 January 1957	Carlisle United	A	D	3–3	Murphy 2, Astall	27,445
Third round replay	9 January 1957	Carlisle United	H	W	4–0	Brown 2, Kinsey, Astall	56,458
Fourth round	26 January 1957	Southend United	A	W	6–1	Murphy, Govan 3, Cox, Lawler og	28,964
Fifth round	16 February 1957	Millwall	A	W	4–1	Kinsey 2, Govan, Brown	41,986
Sixth round	2 March 1957	Nottingham Forest	H	D	0–0		57,827
Sixth round replay	6 March 1957	Nottingham Forest	A	W	1–0	Murphy	36,486
Semi-final	23 March 1957	Manchester United	Hillsborough, Sheffield	L	0–2		65,107

== Inter-Cities Fairs Cup ==
The last two group matches of the inaugural season of the Inter-Cities Fairs Cup were completed during this season, as a result of which Birmingham qualified for the semi-finals, in which they were to play Barcelona the following season.

Round	Date	Opponents	Venue	Result	Score F–A	Scorers	Attendance
Group B	3 December 1956	Zagreb XI	H	W	3–0	Orritt, Brown, Murphy	40,144
Group B	17 April 1957	Inter Milan	H	W	2–1	Govan 2	34,461

== Appearances and goals ==
Numbers in parentheses denote appearances made or goals scored as a substitute.
Players marked † left the club during the playing season.
Key to positions: GK – Goalkeeper; FB – Full back; HB – Half back; FW – Forward

Players' appearances and goals by competition
Pos.	Nat.	Name	League		FA Cup		Fairs Cup		Total	
Pos.	Nat.	Name	Apps	Goals	Apps	Goals	Apps	Goals	Apps	Goals
GK	ENG	Gil Merrick	40	0	7	0	2	0	49	0
GK	ENG	Johnny Schofield	2	0	0	0	0	0	2	0
FB	ENG	George Allen	8	0	2	0	1	0	11	0
FB	ENG	Jack Badham	1	0	0	0	0	0	1	0
FB	ENG	Brian Farmer	3	0	0	0	1	0	4	0
FB	ENG	Ken Green	40	0	5	0	2	0	47	0
FB	ENG	Jeff Hall	36	0	7	0	1	0	44	0
HB	ENG	Bunny Larkin	7	1	0	0	0	0	8	1
HB	ENG	Bert Linnecor †	11	0	1	0	0	0	12	1
HB	ENG	Dick Neal	2	0	0	0	0	0	2	0
HB	ENG	Johnny Newman	8	0	1	0	0	0	9	0
HB	ENG	Graham Sissons	1	0	0	0	0	0	1	0
HB	ENG	Trevor Smith	37	0	7	0	1	0	45	0
HB	ENG	Roy Warhurst	33	0	7	0	2	0	42	0
HB	ENG	Johnny Watts	27	0	5	0	2	0	34	0
FW	ENG	Gordon Astall	40	11	6	2	1	0	47	13
FW	ENG	Eddy Brown	38	16	7	3	2	1	47	20
FW	ENG	Geoff Cox	4	0	1	1	0 (1)	0	5 (1)	1
FW	ENG	Bill Finney	4	0	0	0	0	0	4	0
FW	SCO	Alex Govan	35	24	7	4	2	2	44	30
FW	ENG	Dennis Harper	1	0	0	0	0	0	1	0
FW	WAL	Noel Kinsey	28	5	7	3	1 (1) (Note: Matthews source omits Kinsey's substitute appearance at home to Zagreb.)	0	36 (1)	8
FW	ENG	Peter Murphy	35	7	6	4	2	1	43	12
FW	ENG	Keith Neale	2	0	0	0	0	0	2	0
FW	WAL	Bryan Orritt	18	3	1	0	1	1	20	4
FW	ENG	Peter Warmington	1	0	0	0	0	0	1	0

== See also ==
- Birmingham City F.C. seasons
