= Alex Govan =

Scottish footballer

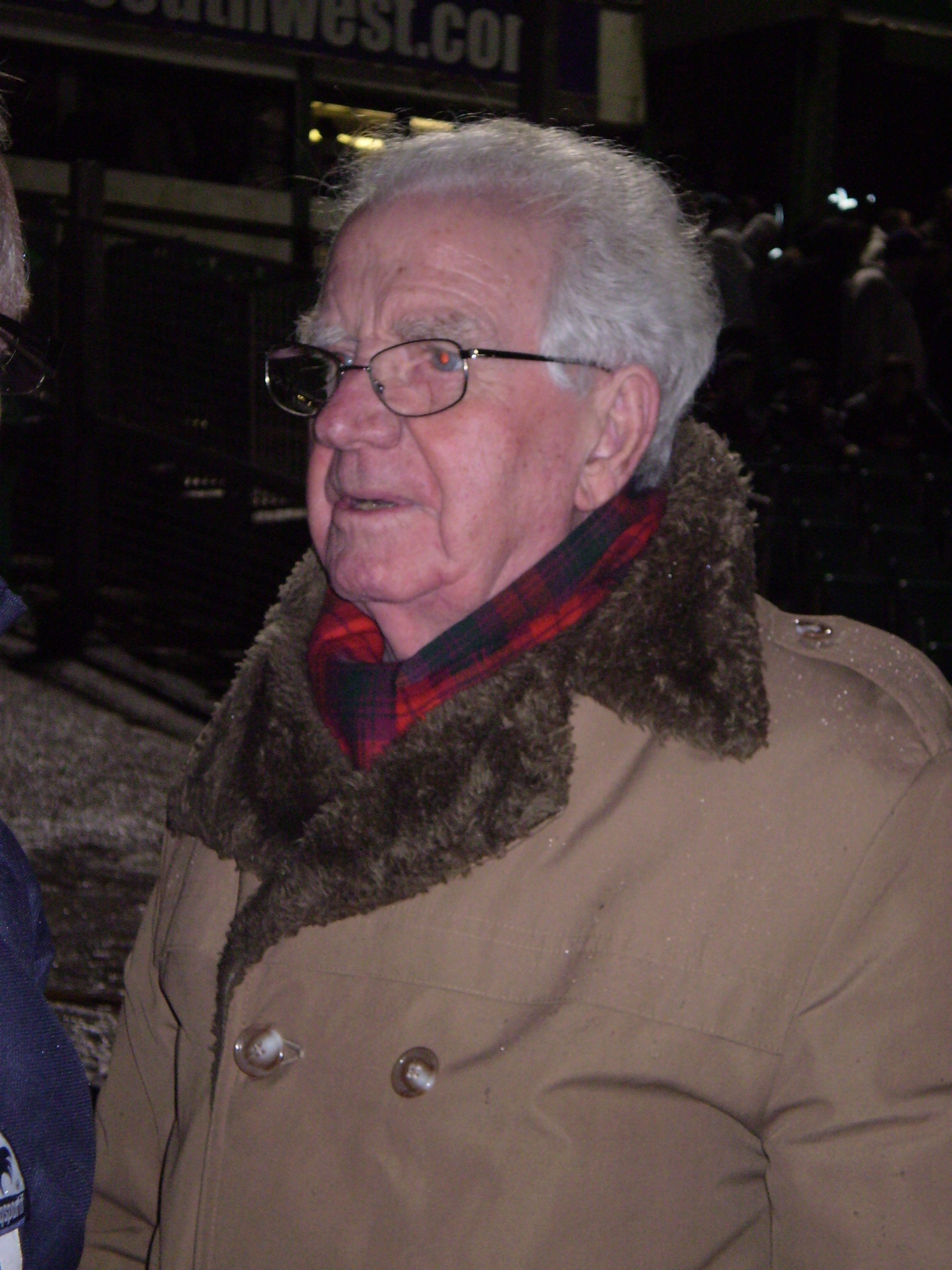
- Govan in December 2008

Personal information
- Full name: Alexander Govan
- Date of birth: 16 June 1929
- Place of birth: Glasgow, Scotland
- Date of death: 10 June 2016 (aged 86)
- Place of death: Plymouth, England
- Position: Outside left

Youth career
- Bridgeton Boys Club
- 1944–1946: Plymouth Argyle

Senior career*
Years	Team	Apps	(Gls)
1946–1953	Plymouth Argyle	110	(28)
1953–1958	Birmingham City	166	(53)
1958	Portsmouth	11	(2)
1958–1960	Plymouth Argyle	32	(8)
Total		319	(91)

Managerial career
- 1972–1973: Truro City
- * Club domestic league appearances and goals

Alexander Govan (16 June 1929 – 10 June 2016) was a Scottish professional footballer who played at outside left. Most of his career was spent with Plymouth Argyle (in two spells) and with Birmingham City during their most successful period in the 1950s, and he also had a short spell with Portsmouth. He is credited with being responsible for Birmingham's fans adopting Harry Lauder's song "Keep right on to the end of the road" as their anthem.

== Life and career ==
Govan was born in Glasgow. He played football for Bridgeton Boys Club, was capped for Scotland at schoolboy level, and played one youth international match for his country, against Wales youth team in 1945. He was recommended to Plymouth Argyle manager Jack Tresadern by Alec Hardie, head of the club's Scottish scouting network, who thought he would go on to represent Scotland at senior level. After a successful trial, he was eventually persuaded to make the long trip south, and he signed for Argyle at the end of August 1946. Govan admits there was an incentive apart from the football:

One of the directors was a builder and he took me on as an apprentice chippie – not officially, but on the books to keep me out of National Service! When I got to 18 I was eventually called up by the RAF but I would often go back to Plymouth at the weekends to play for the reserves.

He scored 30 goals in 117 appearances for Plymouth, and was part of the team that won the Third Division South championship in the 1951–52 season.

When Birmingham City showed an interest in signing Govan, he was reluctant to move away from the Plymouth area, as his wife was a local girl, but when manager Bob Brocklebank promised them a house, the deal went ahead. Govan signed for Birmingham in June 1953 for a fee of £6,500. He scored on his debut and finished that season with eight goals. With the addition of the prolific Eddy Brown to regular top scorer Peter Murphy, a former league-winner with Tottenham Hotspur, combined with the creativity of Govan, fellow Plymouth winger Gordon Astall and Welsh international Noel Kinsey who had all joined the club the previous year, the Birmingham forward line outclassed any other in the 1954–55 Second Division. All five reached double figures as the club won the Second Division title.

Though unable to score at such a rate in the top flight, the club still achieved its highest ever league finish of sixth place. They also reached the 1956 FA Cup Final, and it was during that season's FA Cup campaign that Govan was responsible for Harry Lauder's song "Keep Right On To The End of the Road" being adopted (and adapted) as the anthem of the Birmingham City fans. There is no definitive explanation of how this happened. One version has him heard singing it on the coach on the way to the quarter-final against Arsenal;

Govan was the man who first sang the Blues anthem Keep Right on to the End of the Road on the way to Birmingham's 1956 FA Cup quarter-final against Arsenal. The song spread quickly among the players – and then to the fans.

another has him revealing in a radio interview that it was his favourite song.

In the build-up to the 1956 FA Cup semi-final with Sunderland I was interviewed by the press and happened to let slip that my favourite song was Harry Lauder's old music hall number 'Keep Right on to the End of the Road'. I thought no more about it, but when the third goal went in at Hillsborough the Blues fans all started singing it. It was the proudest moment of my life.

Either way, by the time the football correspondent of the Times came to write his Cup Final preview, the song was well enough established for him to describe how

the Birmingham clans swept their side along to Wembley – the first side ever to reach a final without once playing at home – on the wings of the song Keep right on to the end of the road.

The strengths of Govan's game were hard work, pace on the wing and exceptional goalscoring ability. In April 1956, his ability was recognised by the national selectors when he received his only call-up to the full Scotland squad for a match against Austria. Unfortunately for him the international match was due to be played only three days before the Cup Final, so Birmingham refused to release him. The following season, he was Birmingham's leading scorer with 30 goals in all competitions. This was a remarkable tally, especially for a winger, and included no fewer than five hat-tricks:

I scored five hat-tricks that year, including three in ten days – I couldn't believe it myself! The sad thing is that in those days you didn't get to keep the match ball as it was dubbined up and used again the next week!

He also took a productive part in Birmingham's first foray into European competition in the 1955–58 Inter-Cities Fairs Cup, scoring both goals to beat Inter Milan 2–1 and thereby top the qualifying group.

By 1958 his pace was beginning to flag. Winger Harry Hooper came in from Wolverhampton Wanderers for a £20,000 fee. In March 1958 Govan was transferred to Portsmouth but failed to settle; six months later he returned to his first club Plymouth Argyle. He contributed to the club winning the Third Division championship that season before retiring the following year, and settling in Plymouth.

In 2012, Govan was one of seven former players elected to Birmingham City's Hall of Fame.

Govan died at his Plymouth home on 10 June 2016 at the age of 86.

== Career statistics ==
Appearances and goals by club, season and competition
Club	Season	League			FA Cup		Other		Total	
Club	Season	Division	Apps	Goals	Apps	Goals	Apps	Goals	Apps	Goals
Plymouth Argyle	1946–47	Second Division	2	0	0	0	—		2	0
Plymouth Argyle	1947–48	Second Division	2	0	0	0	—		2	0
Plymouth Argyle	1948–49	Second Division	2	0	0	0	—		2	0
Plymouth Argyle	1949–50	Second Division	1	0	0	0	—		1	0
Plymouth Argyle	1950–51	Third Division South	35	9	3	1	—		38	10
Plymouth Argyle	1951–52	Third Division South	35	9	1	0	—		36	9
Plymouth Argyle	1952–53	Third Division South	33	10	3	2	—		36	12
Plymouth Argyle	Total		110	28	7	3	—		117	31
Birmingham City	1953–54	Second Division	38	8	2	0	—		40	8
Birmingham City	1954–55	Second Division	37	15	4	1	—		41	16
Birmingham City	1955–56	First Division	36	4	3	0	1 (Note: Appearances in Inter-Cities Fairs Cup)	0	40	4
Birmingham City	1956–57	First Division	35	24	7	4	2	2	44	30
Birmingham City	1957–58	First Division	20	2	0	0	2	0	22	2
Birmingham City	Total		166	53	16	5	5	2	187	60
Portsmouth	1957–58	First Division	9	2	—		—		9	2
Portsmouth	1958–59	First Division	2	0	—		—		2	0
Portsmouth	Total		11	2	—		—		11	2
Plymouth Argyle	1959–60	Third Division	20	6	1	0	—		21	6
Plymouth Argyle	1960–61	Second Division	12	2	0	0	—		12	2
Plymouth Argyle	Total		32	8	1	0	—		33	8
Career total			319	91	24	8	5	2	348	101

== Honours ==
Plymouth Argyle

- Football League Third Division South: 1951–52
- Football League Third Division: 1958–59

Birmingham City

- Football League Second Division: 1954–55
- FA Cup runner-up: 1955–56

Individual

- Birmingham City Top Goalscorer: 1956–57

== Sources ==
- Lewis, Peter, ed. (2000). Keeping right on since 1875 The Official History of Birmingham City Football Club. Lytham: Arrow. ISBN 1-900722-12-7.
- Matthews, Tony (1995). Birmingham City: A Complete Record. Derby: Breedon Books. ISBN 1-85983-010-2.
- Matthews, Tony (2000). The Encyclopedia of Birmingham City Football Club 1875–2000. Cradley Heath: Britespot. ISBN 0-9539288-0-2.
- Matthews, Tony (2010). Birmingham City: The Complete Record. Derby: Derby Books. ISBN 978-1-85983-853-2.
