= Keith Neale =

English footballer

Personal information
- Full name: Keith Ian Neale
- Date of birth: 19 January 1935 (age 91)
- Place of birth: Birmingham, England
- Position: Inside forward

Senior career*
Years	Team	Apps	(Gls)
- Metropolitan
1953–1957	Birmingham City	5	(1)
1957–1959	Lincoln City	8	(1)
1959–1960	Kettering Town		
1960–196?	Boston United		
1963–19??	Gainsborough Trinity		
- * Club domestic league appearances and goals

Keith Ian Neale (born 19 January 1935) is an English former professional footballer who played in the Football League for Birmingham City and Lincoln City. He played as an inside forward.

== Career ==
Neale was born in the Yardley district of Birmingham. He played in the Birmingham Works League for the Metropolitan works team before joining Birmingham City, initially as an amateur, in August 1953. He remained in the junior teams for some time before making his debut in the League Division on 10 April 1957, deputising for Gordon Astall at outside right in the local derby at home to Aston Villa, a game which Birmingham lost 2–1. He played once more that season and three times in 1957–58, standing in variously for Eddy Brown and Noel Kinsey, but the strength of Birmingham's forward line in the mid-1950s was such that Neale was only ever considered as a reserve.

In November 1957 he joined Second Division club Lincoln City, but played only nine games in all competitions before dropping down into non-league football at the end of the 1958–59 season. He spent the next season with Kettering Town of the Southern League, scoring 18 goals from 32 games, and also played for Boston United and Gainsborough Trinity.
