= Brian Hopkins =

Brian Hopkins may refer to:

- Brian Hopkins (footballer) (1933–2024), English footballer
- Brian Hopkins (cricketer) (born 1941), New Zealand cricketer
- Brian A. Hopkins (born 1960), American horror writer
- Brian K. Hopkins (born 1961), Democratic alderman of Chicago

== See also ==
- Bryan Hopkin (1914–2009), Welsh economist
