= 1957–58 Birmingham City F.C. season =

Birmingham City F.C.
1957–58 season
- Chairman: Harry Morris Jr
- Manager: Arthur Turner until February 1958; Turner and Pat Beasley (joint appointment) thereafter
- Ground: St Andrew's
- Football League First Division: 13th
- FA Cup: Third round (eliminated by York City)
- Inter-Cities Fairs Cup: Semi-final (eliminated by Barcelona)
- Top goalscorer: League: Peter Murphy (20); All: Peter Murphy (23)
- Highest home attendance: 50,780 vs Aston Villa, 24 August 1957
- Lowest home attendance: 15,937 vs Sheffield Wednesday, 12 March 1958
- Average home league attendance: 29,553
Home colours

The 1957–58 Football League season was Birmingham City Football Club's 55th in the Football League and their 31st in the First Division. They finished in 13th position in the 22-team division. They entered the 1957–58 FA Cup at the third round proper and lost in that round to York City. In the inaugural edition of the Inter-Cities Fairs Cup, Birmingham lost in the semi-final in a play-off, having drawn on aggregate score with Barcelona.

In February 1958, Pat Beasley joined the club. Beasley had believed he was coming as assistant to manager Arthur Turner, but chairman Harry Morris announced to the press that he was to be appointed joint manager. Turner, who found about this arrangement not from the club but from the press, threatened to resign. He was persuaded to stay "for the time being", but finally left early in the 1958–59 season.

Twenty-four players made at least one appearance in nationally or internationally organised first-team competition, and there were twelve different goalscorers. Half back Dick Neal played in 44 of the 46 first-team matches over the season, and Peter Murphy finished as leading goalscorer with 23 goals in all competitions, of which 20 were scored in the league.

== Football League First Division ==
Date	League position	Opponents	Venue	Result	Score F–A	Scorers	Attendance
24 August 1957	6th	Aston Villa	H	W	3–1	Brown, Kinsey, Murphy	50,780
28 August 1957	5th	Nottingham Forest	A	D	1–1	Brown	29,705
31 August 1957	11th	Chelsea	A	L	1–5	Brown	43,806
4 September 1957	15th	Nottingham Forest	H	L	0–2		26,852
7 September 1957	18th	Newcastle United	H	L	1–4	Hellawell	29,784
11 September 1957	19th	Tottenham Hotspur	H	D	0–0		26,485
14 September 1957	21st	Burnley	A	L	1–3	Neal	20,522
18 September 1957	22nd	Tottenham Hotspur	A	L	1–7	Brown	35,292
21 September 1957	20th	Preston North End	H	W	3–1	Neale, Murphy, Govan pen	24,894
28 September 1957	21st	Sheffield Wednesday	A	L	3–5	Orritt 2, Murphy	20,129
1 October 1957	21st	West Bromwich Albion	A	D	0–0		39,738
5 October 1957	15th	Manchester City	H	W	4–0	Murphy 3, Brown	28,059
12 October 1957	17th	Wolverhampton Wanderers	H	L	1–5	Astall	43,005
19 October 1957	15th	Arsenal	A	W	3–1	Orritt, Neal 2	39,031
26 October 1957	14th	Bolton Wanderers	H	W	5–1	Brown 2, Orritt, Murphy, Watts	26,225
2 November 1957	15th	Luton Town	A	L	0–3		17,316
9 November 1957	16th	Sunderland	H	L	2–3	Murphy, Govan	25,315
16 November 1957	15th	Everton	A	W	2–0	Murphy 2	34,875
23 November 1957	15th	Blackpool	H	D	0–0		32,178
30 November 1957	15th	Leeds United	A	D	1–1	Orritt	21,358
7 December 1957	15th	Manchester United	H	D	3–3	Kinsey, Murphy, Astall	35,191
14 December 1957	15th	Leicester City	A	D	2–2	Kinsey, Astall	28,680
21 December 1957	15th	Aston Villa	A	W	2–0	Brown, Kinsey	41,118
26 December 1957	15th	West Bromwich Albion	H	L	3–5	Brown, Hooper pen, Neal	48,396
28 December 1957	15th	Chelsea	H	D	3–3	Brown, Murphy 2	37,436
11 January 1958	15th	Newcastle United	A	W	2–1	Brown, Kinsey	34,825
18 January 1958	15th	Burnley	H	L	2–3	Murphy, Hooper	22,281
1 February 1958	15th	Preston North End	A	L	0–8		21,511
22 February 1958	17th	Wolverhampton Wanderers	A	L	1–5	Murphy	36,941
1 March 1958	15th	Arsenal	H	W	4–1	Brown 2, Murphy, Hooper	26,834
5 March 1958	15th	Manchester City	A	D	1–1	Murphy	30,655
8 March 1958	16th	Bolton Wanderers	A	L	0–1		18,309
12 March 1958	15th	Sheffield Wednesday	H	W	1–0	Orritt	15,937
15 March 1958	15th	Luton Town	H	D	1–1	Orritt	25,225
22 March 1958	15th	Blackpool	A	L	2–4	Astall, Hooper pen	11,549
29 March 1958	15th	Everton	H	W	2–1	Hooper 2	21,628
4 April 1958	15th	Portsmouth	A	L	2–3	Murphy, Hooper	33,075
5 April 1958	14th	Sunderland	A	W	6–1	Murphy, Astall, Brown, Hooper, Orritt 2	34,194
7 April 1958	12th	Portsmouth	H	W	4–1	Brown, Orritt, Murphy, Hooper	23,380
12 April 1958	13th	Leeds United	H	D	1–1	Orritt	23,112
19 April 1958	12th	Manchester United	A	W	2–0	Hooper, Green	39,215
26 April 1958	13th	Leicester City	H	L	0–1		27,607

=== League table (part) ===
Final First Division table (part)
Pos	Club	Pld	W	D	L	F	A	GA	Pts
11th	Chelsea	42	15	12	15	82	79	1.05	42
12th	Arsenal	42	16	7	19	73	85	0.86	39
13th	Birmingham City	42	14	11	17	76	89	0.85	39
14th	Aston Villa	42	16	7	19	73	86	0.85	39
15th	Bolton Wanderers	42	14	10	18	65	87	0.75	38
Key	Pos = League position; Pld = Matches played; W = Matches won; D = Matches drawn; L = Matches lost; F = Goals for; A = Goals against; GA = Goal average; Pts = Points								
Source									

== FA Cup ==
Round	Date	Opponents	Venue	Result	Score F–A	Scorers	Attendance
Third round	8 January 1958	York City	A	L	0–3		19,750

== Inter-Cities Fairs Cup ==
The group stage of the inaugural edition of the Inter-Cities Fairs Cup was completed during the 1956–57 playing season. The score at half time in the first leg of the semi-final, at St Andrew's, was 3–3, and Peter Murphy scored the winner after an hour. In the away leg, in the recently opened Camp Nou, El Mundo Deportivo expected a comfortable victory for the hosts, but the result was rather less clear-cut. The only goal of the game was scored after 82 minutes by Kubala, who saw Gil Merrick off his line and neatly lobbed him. With no away goals rule, the game went into 30 minutes of extra time, which remained goalless, so a replay was to be played on a neutral ground. Controversy arose when Birmingham were prevented from substituting the injured Bunny Larkin, contrary to what they believed had been agreed before the match; Barcelona manager Domènec Balmanya claimed the agreement allowed for two substitutes, but outfield players could only be replaced in the first half. Asked what he thought of Barcelona, Birmingham trainer Dave Fairhurst said he thought they played better in the first leg, where they concentrated on playing; here, they spent too much time complaining. Balmanya's opinion of Birmingham had not changed since the first leg: he saw them as a physical team with crude technique, too concerned with the opponent to think much about the ball.

El Mundo Deportivo was more complimentary about Birmingham's style of play in the replay. While they had come to Barcelona to avoid losing, and nearly succeeded, they went to St. Jakob-Park, in Basel, Switzerland, to win, and to be worthy of the victory. It also suggested that the playing surface – rough, and covered with long wet grass – was better suited to an open, long-ball game than to precise passing and close marking. Barcelona scored first through Evaristo, Murphy equalised early in the second half, then with seven minutes left, Suárez picked up the ball in midfield and passed to Kubala who drew Merrick out of his goal and gave him no chance with his shot.

Round	Date	Opponents	Venue	Result	Score F–A	Scorers	Attendance
Semi-final 1st leg	23 October 1957	Barcelona	H	W	4–3	Murphy 2, Brown, Orritt	30,791
Semi-final 2nd leg	13 November 1957	Barcelona	A	L	0–1 aet		60,000
Semi-final playoff	26 November 1957	Barcelona	St. Jakob-Park, Basel	L	1–2	Murphy	20,000

== Appearances and goals ==
Players marked † left the club during the playing season.
Key to positions: GK – Goalkeeper; FB – Full back; HB – Half back; FW – Forward

Players' appearances and goals by competition
Pos.	Nat.	Name	League		FA Cup		Fairs Cup		Total	
Pos.	Nat.	Name	Apps	Goals	Apps	Goals	Apps	Goals	Apps	Goals
GK	ENG	Gil Merrick	28	0	1	0	3	0	32	0
GK	ENG	Johnny Schofield	14	0	0	0	0	0	14	0
FB	ENG	George Allen	4	0	0	0	2	0	6	0
FB	ENG	Brian Farmer	13	0	1	0	2	0	16	0
FB	ENG	Ken Green	31	1	0	0	0	0	31	1
FB	ENG	Jeff Hall	37	0	1	0	2	0	40	0
HB	ENG	Bunny Larkin	22	0	0	0	2	0	24	0
HB	ENG	Joe Mullett	3	0	0	0	0	0	3	0
HB	ENG	Dick Neal	40	4	1	0	3	0	44	4
HB	ENG	Johnny Newman †	6	0	0	0	0	0	6	0
HB	ENG	Graham Sissons	2	0	0	0	0	0	2	0
HB	ENG	Trevor Smith	37	0	1	0	3	0	41	0
HB	ENG	Johnny Watts	22	1	1	0	2	0	25	1
FW	ENG	Gordon Astall	37	5	1	0	3	0	41	5
FW	ENG	Eddy Brown	37	15	1	0	3	1	41	16
FW	SCO	Alex Govan †	20	2	0	0	2	0	22	2
FW	ENG	Mike Hellawell	1	1	0	0	0	0	1	1
FW	ENG	Harry Hooper	22	10	1	0	0	0	23	10
FW	ENG	David Jones	5	0	0	0	0	0	5	0
FW	ENG	Bud Houghton	2	0	0	0	0	0	2	0
FW	WAL	Noel Kinsey †	15	5	1	0	1	0	17	5
FW	ENG	Peter Murphy	36	20	1	0	3	3	40	23
FW	ENG	Keith Neale †	3	1	0	0	0	0	3	1
FW	WAL	Bryan Orritt	25	11	0	0	2	1	27	12

== See also ==
- Birmingham City F.C. seasons
