= Jimmy Adams (footballer) =

English footballer

Personal information
- Full name: James Arthur Adams
- Date of birth: 2 August 1937
- Place of birth: Stoke-on-Trent, England
- Date of death: 30 December 2005 (aged 68)
- Place of death: Stoke-on-Trent, England
- Position: Full-back

Youth career
- Wolverhampton Wanderers

Senior career*
Years	Team	Apps	(Gls)
1956–1960	Port Vale	1	(0)
1960–1961	Crewe Alexandra	0	(0)
1961–1963	Macclesfield Town	46	(0)
Total		47	(0)
- * Club domestic league appearances and goals

James Arthur Adams (2 August 1937 – 30 December 2005) was an English footballer who played at full-back for Port Vale, Crewe Alexandra and Macclesfield Town from 1956 to 1963.

== Career ==
Adams spent his youth with Wolverhampton Wanderers, before he returned to his hometown of Stoke-on-Trent to sign for Freddie Steele's Port Vale in May 1956. There he was converted from a wing-half position to play at full-back. His only appearance for the club came in a Third Division South clash at Brentford's Griffin Park on 26 April 1958, Vale losing 4–1. He was released from Vale Park by manager Norman Low in May 1960 and later joined Crewe Alexandra. He did not feature in a senior game for the "Railwaymen", and in February 1961 joined Macclesfield Town in the Cheshire County League. He actually made his first-team debut for the "Silkmen" against Crewe Alexandra Reserves in a Cheshire Senior Cup match on 4 February. He made 46 league and 12 cup appearances, before a re-occurrence of an old knee injury forced his retirement in October 1963. During his time at Macclesfield, he was employed as a draughtsman at ROF Radway Green at Radway Green.

== Career statistics ==
Appearances and goals by club, season and competition
Club	Season	League			FA Cup		Total	
Club	Season	Division	Apps	Goals	Apps	Goals	Apps	Goals
Port Vale	1957–58	Third Division South	1	0	0	0	1	0
Macclesfield Town	1961–63	Cheshire County League						
Macclesfield Town total			46	0	12	0	58	0
Career total			47	0	12	0	59	0
