= Bert Carberry =

Scottish footballer (born 1931)

Personal information
- Full name: Robert Carberry
- Date of birth: 16 January 1931
- Place of birth: Glasgow, Scotland
- Position: Half-back

Youth career
- Avondale

Senior career*
Years	Team	Apps	(Gls)
1953–1955	Norwich City	5	(0)
1955–1956	Bedford Town		
1956–1957	Gillingham	1	(0)
1957–1958	Port Vale	29	(0)
1958–1959	Exeter City	0	(0)
1959–?	Burton Albion		
Total		35+	(0+)
- * Club domestic league appearances and goals

Robert Carberry (born 16 January 1931) was a Scottish footballer who played as a half-back in the Football League for Norwich City, Gillingham, and Port Vale between 1953 and 1958.

== Career ==
Carberry played for Avondale before joining Norwich City in 1953, who were then managed by Norman Low. He made five Third Division South appearances in 1953–54 and 1954–55 before departing Carrow Road. He spent the 1955–56 season in the Southern League with Bedford Town, playing 16 matches. He signed with Archie Clark's Gillingham, and featured once in the Third Division South in the 1956–57 season, on the opening day against Watford at Priestfield. He joined league rivals Port Vale in July 1957, in a move that reunited him with Norman Low, and his debut came at centre-half in a 1–0 away triumph at Aldershot on 24 August. He enjoyed regular football from that game until he lost his place in February 1958. He transferred to Exeter City in August 1958, having made 32 league and cup appearances for the "Valiants" in 1957–58. He did not play in the Fourth Division for the "Grecians". He was given a free transfer in May 1959. He then moved back to the Southern League with Burton Albion.

== Career statistics ==
Appearances and goals by club, season and competition
Club	Season	League			FA Cup		Total	
Club	Season	Division	Apps	Goals	Apps	Goals	Apps	Goals
Norwich City	1953–54	Third Division South	4	0	0	0	4	0
Norwich City	1954–55	Third Division South	1	0	0	0	1	0
Norwich City	Total		5	0	0	0	5	0
Gillingham	1956–57	Third Division South	1	0	0	0	1	0
Port Vale	1957–58	Third Division South	29	0	3	0	32	0
Exeter City	1958–59	Fourth Division	0	0	0	0	0	0
