= Fred Hough =

English footballer

Personal information
- Full name: Frederick Alan Hough
- Date of birth: 23 December 1935 (age 90)
- Place of birth: Stoke-on-Trent, England
- Position: Right winger

Senior career*
Years	Team	Apps	(Gls)
1955–1958	Port Vale	4	(0)
Total		4	(0)
- * Club domestic league appearances and goals

Frederick Alan Hough (born 23 December 1935) is an English former footballer who played on the right-wing for Port Vale in the 1950s.

== Career ==
Hough joined Port Vale in June 1955 and made his debut at Vale Park in a 1–0 loss to Coventry City on Boxing Day of 1957. He played three further Third Division South games that season before "Valiants" manager Norman Low handed him a free transfer in May 1958.

== Career statistics ==
Appearances and goals by club, season and competition
Club	Season	League			FA Cup		Total	
Club	Season	Division	Apps	Goals	Apps	Goals	Apps	Goals
Port Vale	1957–58	Third Division South	4	0	0	0	4	0
