= Dennis Harper (footballer) =

English footballer

Personal information
- Full name: Dennis Harper
- Date of birth: 12 October 1936 (age 90)
- Place of birth: Wednesbury, England
- Height: 5 ft 10 1/2 in (1.79 m)
- Position: Inside forward

Senior career*
Years	Team	Apps	(Gls)
	Aston Villa	0	(0)
- Darlaston
1955–1959	Birmingham City	1	(0)
1959–1961	Romford		
1961	Burton Albion		
1961–1962	Nuneaton Borough	7	(3)
1962	Stafford Rangers		
1962–196?	Brierley Hill Alliance		
- * Club domestic league appearances and goals

Dennis Harper (born 12 October 1936) is an English former professional footballer who played in the Football League for Birmingham City. Primarily an inside forward, Harper also played non-league football for clubs including Darlaston, Romford, Burton Albion, Nuneaton Borough, Stafford Rangers and Brierley Hill Alliance.

== Life and career ==
Harper was born in Wednesbury, Staffordshire. He signed amateur forms with Aston Villa in February 1954, and also played football for Darlaston. Harper signed amateur forms with Birmingham City at the start of the 1955–56 season, and turned professional the following August despite still having six months left of his National Service commitments with the RAF.

He was brought into the travelling party on 20 February as cover in case Bolton Wanderers' pitch proved too firm for Peter Murphy's troublesome knee; it was, Harper made his First Division debut, and Birmingham lost 3–1. He was transfer-listed at the end of the next season, but re-signed in June after joint manager Arthur Turner gave him another chance, believing that "the frail-looking Harper could make the grade if he put a bit more snap in his game." He made no more senior appearances, and was again transfer-listed at the end of the 1958–59 season. Despite interest from Fourth Division club Torquay United and Arthur Turner's new employers, Headington United of the Southern League, Harper signed for Romford, in their first season as a professional club.

He helped Romford win the Southern League Division One title, and scored seven goals from 50 appearances before leaving the club in the middle of the next season to join Burton Albion. He moved on again in the close season to Nuneaton Borough, managed by his former Birmingham team-mate Jack Badham, and played regularly at the start of the season, but was transfer-listed in December. He did not leave, and made three more appearances in March 1962, before being given a free transfer at the end of the campaign. He joined Stafford Rangers, but found the travelling to training too onerous, and switched to Brierley Hill Alliance in September 1962.

== Sources ==
- Matthews, Tony (1995). Birmingham City: A Complete Record. Derby: Breedon Books. ISBN 978-1-85983-010-9.
