= Keep Right On to the End of the Road =

"Keep Right On To The End Of The Road"

Song
- Language: English
- Published: 1924
- Songwriter: Harry Lauder

"Keep Right On To The End Of The Road" is a popular song written by Harry Lauder in 1924.

== History ==
Lauder wrote the song in a railway carriage in April 1924, returning home to prepare for a tour of England. He débuted the song at the Victoria Palace Theatre in London, on 28 April, to an enthusiastic reception; one gentleman in the audience rose to declare it a "sermon on the stage" and Lauder was prevailed upon to sing it a second time.

Lauder wrote the song in honour of his son, killed in the First World War, and it was originally published under the name "The End Of The Road". Lauder first recorded it on 26 October 1925 at a studio in Hayes, Middlesex, accompanied by the George W. Byng orchestra, and it was released on the His Master's Voice label (catalogue number D1085), sharing the shellac with "The Road to the Isles", the following April. John Peel chose it as a representative for 1925 in his "Peelennium" retrospective.

The song was such a success that by 1926 he was using it to close his set. It was also played at his funeral, as the pallbearers brought the coffin from his Strathaven home, Lauder Ha' to Hamilton, where the service took place.

== Association with Birmingham City F.C. ==
The song is the official club song of Birmingham City F.C., adopted during the club's run to the 1955–56 FA Cup final. On a coach to Highbury for the quarter-final tie at Arsenal in March 1956, the players sang songs to ease the tension, and manager Arthur Turner asked Scottish winger Alex Govan for his choice; he started singing "Keep Right On", and the players were still singing on arrival at the ground, with the coach surrounded by Blues fans. The players were also heard singing the song in the dressing-room after the 3–1 win in celebration.

The fans took to the song quickly, singing it at the semi-final win over Sunderland later that month, and Lauder's recording was played before a home game with Blackpool a week later, with songsheets available for spectators. The song has been a constant at the club's matches ever since, albeit with lyrics slightly altered to suit the club. The song got to no. 157 in the UK singles charts, and no. 23 in the Independent Singles Charts, the week before Blues won the EFL Cup in 2011. The club resumed playing the recording in 2024 after a takeover in 2023 pre match.
