= Eddy Brown =

English footballer (1926–2012)

Personal information
- Full name: Edwin Brown
- Date of birth: 28 February 1926
- Place of birth: Preston, England
- Date of death: 12 July 2012 (aged 86)
- Place of death: Preston, England
- Height: 5 ft 9 in (1.75 m)
- Position: Centre forward

Senior career*
| Years | Team | Apps | (Gls) |
| 1948–1950 | Preston North End | 36 | (16) |
| 1950–1952 | Southampton | 57 | (32) |
| 1952–1954 | Coventry City | 85 | (50) |
| 1954–1959 | Birmingham City | 158 | (74) |
| 1959–1961 | Leyton Orient | 63 | (28) |
| 1961–1964 | Scarborough | 89 | (47) |
| Total | | 488 | (247) |

Managerial career
- 1961–1964: Scarborough
- * Club domestic league appearances and goals

Edwin Brown (28 February 1926 – 12 July 2012) was an English footballer who played as a centre forward. He played professionally for a number of clubs, but the peak of his career was spent with Birmingham City during their most successful period in the 1950s. Over a professional career of nearly 400 appearances in the Football League, he scored at a rate of one goal every two games. He was a pioneer of the goal celebration.

== Early life ==
Brown was born in Jutland Street, Preston, Lancashire and attended St Ignatius primary school in the town. He was a religious boy, and at the age of twelve began to attend the De La Salle Catholic college on Guernsey with a view to taking Holy Orders. He studied at the college for eight years, during which time the boys were evacuated to the mainland when the Germans invaded, a disruption which did not prevent Brown achieving four A levels (in English, French, Latin and History) and laying the foundations for his lifelong love of Shakespeare.

== Football career ==
=== Preston North End ===
However, after the war he returned to Preston and in August 1948 was persuaded to defer his calling to make use of his gift for football instead. He presented himself at Deepdale and said "I am a centre forward." Preston took him at his word and he scored a hat-trick on his debut for the "A" team which secured him a professional contract.

He joined Preston at a time when Bill Shankly was nearing the end of his Preston playing career; Brown believes his success in the game owed much to the lessons learned from Shankly in that first year:

He said football was all about the soul, enjoying your life, but always keep striving for that bit extra. He could be crude, rude and outspoken, but it would be football for breakfast, dinner and tea. He was an astonishing and genuine man and football was his obsession. Bill was a preacher, but he always preached with a smile on his face. If I hadn't started at Preston and not met Bill Shankly, who was so kind to me, I don't think I'd have made a living out of football.

=== Southampton ===
In 1950 Preston paid Second Division Southampton £10,000 plus the services of Brown to bring goalscorer Charlie Wayman, whose family had been unable to settle in the south, back nearer home in the north of England.

When Brown joined Southampton, he found it difficult to replace Wayman who had become a cult-hero with The Dell crowds. After his retirement, Brown admitted that "strolling around (Southampton) soon after his transfer, he wondered what he had done as everywhere he turned there were reminders of just how popular Wayman had become."

Nonetheless, Brown was able to overcome this difficult start and, helped by his pace and deadly right foot, he came close to emulating his predecessor's scoring achievements. In the 1950–51 season he scored 20 goals in 36 league games, but Southampton's defence leaked too many goals and they finished in mid-table. The following season started in similar vein, and Brown maintained his scoring ratio with 12 goals in 21 games, until injury meant his season – and his Saints career – came to an end in January 1952.

Brown had failed to settle at Southampton, despite scoring 34 goals in 59 starts while at the club, and in March 1952, having lost his place to Walter Judd, he was granted a transfer to Coventry City of the Third Division (South), where he continued to score goals at an impressive rate.

=== Birmingham City ===
In October 1954, following a run of five games without a win, Coventry sold him to Birmingham City of the Second Division for £9,000, a decision which provoked the resignation of Coventry's manager Jack Fairbrother.

Brown's career at Birmingham coincided with probably the best period in the club's history. He arrived in mid-October 1954, and in that first part-season scored 14 goals in 28 League games, including a hat-trick in a 9–1 demolition of Liverpool which remains their record defeat. His goals helped Birmingham to the 1954–55 Second Division championship.

The following season, 1955–56, they achieved their highest ever finishing position, sixth in the First Division; Brown, playing alongside Peter "Spud" Murphy and Welsh international Noel Kinsey and with Alex Govan and England international Gordon Astall on the wings, finished top scorer with 21 League goals. He scored another seven in the run which took the club to their second ever FA Cup Final, only to lose 3–1 to a Manchester City side inspired by Don Revie. This was the match best remembered for Manchester City's goalkeeper Bert Trautmann breaking a bone in his neck and still finishing the game.

In 1956–57 Brown scored 20 goals in all competitions and played in the semi-final of the FA Cup, losing to Manchester United's Busby Babes. He was also a pioneer of European competition, as part of the Birmingham side which reached the semi-final of the Inter-Cities Fairs Cup 1955–58, where he scored two goals in the 4–3 home leg win over Barcelona before Birmingham eventually lost out in a replay. His last full season at Birmingham, 1957–58, produced another 15 League goals.

=== Later career ===
He moved on to Second Division Leyton Orient in December 1958, where despite arriving halfway through the season he still finished joint leading scorer.

In 1961–62, Brown moved to Scarborough, then in the Northern Counties League, as player-manager; aged 36, he again was his club's top scorer. The next season, he led the club to the championship of the re-formed North Eastern League, the North Eastern League Cup, and the first round proper of the FA Cup, where they only lost by the odd goal in a replay against Crewe Alexandra. The following season, still as player-manager, he led them to runners-up spot in the Midland League.

=== Style and personality ===
The strengths of Brown's game were his pace and movement and a good right-foot finish, in his own words:

I knocked in 237 league and cup goals during 16 years in the game. I didn't pass the ball, I had no left foot at all, so out of those 237 about 234 went in with the right foot! I was no good in the air because at 5' 9" I wasn't big enough – centre-halves in those days were about 6' 9"!

He describes himself as "eccentric". He was noted for his goal celebrations, many years before they became commonplace; his trademark celebration was to shake hands with the corner flag, though he was also known to cuddle a policeman behind the goal or to remove a press photographer's hat and throw it into the crowd. The Times' report of a match in which he scored a hat-trick described him thus:

But out of it all there stood one very real personality – Brown. He underlined Birmingham's authority. The world seems to be his friend. His enthusiasm is infectious and embraces all, from the policeman on the perimeter to the referee and enemy in the middle. He enjoyed himself as much as a shiny faced youth tobogganing down some slope on a tin tray.

He was fond of quoting Shakespeare, whether at press conferences or in the dressing room, and while at Birmingham wrote (without a ghostwriter) a weekly column in the local paper, the Birmingham Mail. After a reunion of the 1956 Cup Final squad, Brown was described as "the star of the show ... who could surely have made it as a stand-up comedian as well as a superb footballer".

== Later life ==
After leaving professional football, Brown returned home to Preston and worked in the family carpet firm as a sales representative. While a Birmingham player, he had worked as a part-time teacher of games and French at a private school in nearby Wolverhampton. His ambition was to become a teacher once his playing days were over. He went on to teach games at Preston Catholic College; one of his pupils was Mark Lawrenson, future Irish international footballer and European Cup-winner with Liverpool. When it became obligatory for teachers to be qualified, Brown enrolled at Durham University at the age of 54 where he acquired his teaching certificate, armed with which he taught French until his retirement.

In his spare time he became passionately involved with a local amateur football club, Broughton Amateurs, where he was appointed first team manager in the 1978–79 season. Two years later he managed the club to a "double" of the Lancashire Amateur League Premier Division, which they won for the first time, and the Lancashire FA Amateur Cup, the first time Broughton had even reached the final. His humour, extrovert nature and managerial ability came out in his pre-Cup Final team talk:

Eddie Brown would address the squad and, as only he can, would relax, motivate and inspire us. This evening he surpassed even himself with his own performance. As in his own style he went through the team player-by-player in such an entertaining manner we forgot there was a match to play, but his brilliant style was such that, although, humorous, the point always hit home.

His influence extended throughout the club, from acting as "front man" for club functions to looking after the pitches. At the age of 70 he was running the club's third team, and, as of January 2009, was still "helping out" on the committee.

Brown was married, with four children and several grandchildren. He spent the last months of his life in a Preston nursing home and died, aged 86, on 12 July 2012.

== Honours ==
=== As a player ===
Birmingham City

- Football League Second Division: 1954–55
- FA Cup runner-up: 1955–56

=== As a player-manager ===
Scarborough

- North Eastern League: 1962–63
- North Eastern League Cup: 1962–63
- Midland League runner-up: 1963–64

=== As a manager ===
Broughton Amateurs

- Lancashire Amateur League Premier Division: 1980–81, 1982–83
- Lancashire Football Association Cup: 1980–81
- Lancashire Amateur League Cup: 1984–85
