= 1957–58 Port Vale F.C. season =

Port Vale F.C.
1957–58 season
- Chairman: Fred Burgess
- Manager: Norman Low
- Stadium: Vale Park
- Football League Third Division South: 15th (42 points)
- FA Cup: Second Round (eliminated by Hull City)
- Top goalscorer: League: Stan Steele (21); All: Stan Steele (22)
- Highest home attendance: 17,286 vs. Coventry City, 26 December 1957
- Lowest home attendance: 5,149 vs. Brentford, 24 March 1958
- Average home league attendance: 10,457
- Biggest win: 5–0 and 6–1
- Biggest defeat: 0–3 and 1–4
Home colours

The 1957–58 season was Port Vale's 46th season of football in the English Football League and their first full season (eighth overall) back in the Third Division South following their relegation from the Second Division. An unusual season, the regional split was to be abolished at the season's end, meaning the bottom two clubs of the Second Division and the clubs placed 2nd to 12th in the Third Division North and the Third Division South would be the founder members of the Third Division. It also meant that the bottom twelve clubs of the Third Division North and the Third Division South would be the founder members of the Fourth Division. In effect, the team's performance in this season could see them placed in either the second, third or fourth tier the following season.

Under manager Norman Low, the side started brightly, winning four of their first six fixtures and notably doing the league double over Southampton — including a 4–0 victory at Vale Park. The attacking policy soon paid off as Stan Steele, Jack Wilkinson, and Harry Poole all reached double figures in goals by mid-season. Despite this promising form, a poor run after Christmas — highlighted by eight defeats in their final 12 matches — dragged them to a 15th‑place finish, and they were placed in the newly formed Fourth Division for the 1958–59 campaign.

In the FA Cup, Vale progressed past Shrewsbury Town in the first round courtesy of Wilkinson's brace, but exited in the Second Round, losing 4–3 away to Hull City in the replay. Financially, average attendance dipped to 10,457, resulting in reduced gate receipts (~£33,800), though tight budgeting and transfer sales allowed the club to register a modest profit of £145. Highlights off the pitch included the arrival of key signings such as goalkeeper Keith Jones and forward Jack Wilkinson, although a mid‑season acquisition of Noel Kinsey failed to arrest the late slump. Steele ended the campaign as Vale's top scorer with 22 goals — his efforts emblematic of a squad in transition and a season of high hopes ultimately unfulfilled.

== Overview ==
=== Third Division South ===
The pre-season saw manager Norman Low sign several young new players to replace those released at the end of the previous season, saying his team would 'fight like hell to get back into the Second Division'. Four of these signings were: impressive forward Jack Wilkinson (Sheffield United); Welsh international goalkeeper Keith Jones (signed from Aston Villa for £3,500); defender Bert Carberry (Gillingham); and Alan Martin – who returned to the club as a part-time professional.

The season opened with a 1–0 win over Aldershot at the Recreation Ground. This started a sequence of just four defeats in 17 games, which included doing the double over Southampton (a 3–0 win at The Dell followed by a 4–0 win at Vale Park). This was achieved with Low's attacking policy, a stark contrast to 'the Steele Curtain' defence. However, their five clean sheets in their first eight games also illustrated their defensive strength. In September, right-half Selwyn Whalley turned part-time, dividing his duties between playing football and teaching at Hanley High School. Winger Alan Bennett was also transferred to Crewe Alexandra. By November, Vale were third in the league, and Low signed Bert Carberry and Jack Wilkinson. On 2 November, Vale recorded a 4–0 home win over Crystal Palace. Despite their attacking nature, Vale had by this time conceded fewer goals than any other side in the Football League. Following this top-scorer Stan Steele went off the boil, as the Vale lost their form in the Christmas period, losing 1–0 twice to Coventry City in two days. Though before this, a 6–1 victory was recorded over Aldershot to put the club into fourth position.

In January, Ken Griffiths was sold to Mansfield Town for a four-figure fee, having mostly languished in the reserves. By February, Vale were in seventh position, only four points off the top spot (with three games in hand) despite their loss of form. Four straight defeats dragged them down towards the bottom half of the table. They bought former Wales international Noel Kinsey from Birmingham City for £5,000 in an attempt to bolster their form. He helped the club achieve a 5–0 win over Watford during a blizzard on 8 March, scoring two goals. Though as injuries developed, the club's form again declined, and the team lost eight of their final twelve games. They laboured to a 2–1 win over Torquay United on 5 April, which was their only victory in the final ten games. Two points from their final six games doomed them to the fourth tier. On 12 April, Keith Jones allowed a free-kick to go into the net after he mistakenly thought it was an indirect free kick, and Norwich City went on to win the game by three goals. Vale lost 3–2 at home to Bournemouth & Boscombe Athletic the following week after Kinsey missed a penalty. A 4–1 defeat at Brentford confirmed Vale's lower-half finish with a game to spare.

They finished in 15th position with 42 points from 46 games. Five points away from the top half of the table, their 'remarkable decline' continued with a second relegation in two years. Their 58 goals conceded were a respectable total, as was their 67 goals scored. Stan Steele, Jack Wilkinson, and Harry Poole all proved themselves consistent goal scorers, scoring 22, 19, and 16 goals respectively.

=== Finances ===
On the financial side, a decline in average attendance by around 3,500 left the club with an average gate of 10,457. Gate receipts were down to £33,800. However, a small staff helped to make a profit of £145 despite player wages rising to £24,158. Five players were released in the summer, most notably Bert Carberry (Exeter City) and Bill Cleary (King's Lynn). Low also sold Colin Askey to Walsall for 'a fairly substantial fee' and Basil Hayward to Portsmouth for 'a fair fee'.

=== FA Cup ===
In the FA Cup, Vale narrowly defeated Shrewsbury Town with two goals from Wilkinson. Third Division North Hull City knocked the Vale out in the second round, however, winning the replay 4–3 at Boothferry Park.

== Results ==
=== Football League Third Division South ===
==== League table ====
| Pos | Team | Pld | W | D | L | GF | GA | GAv | Pts | Promotion or relegation |
|---|---|---|---|---|---|---|---|---|---|---|
| 13 | Northampton Town (R) | 46 | 19 | 6 | 21 | 87 | 79 | 1.101 | 44 | Relegation to the Fourth Division |
| 14 | Crystal Palace (R) | 46 | 15 | 13 | 18 | 70 | 72 | 0.972 | 43 | Relegation to the Fourth Division |
| 15 | Port Vale (R) | 46 | 16 | 10 | 20 | 67 | 58 | 1.155 | 42 | Relegation to the Fourth Division |
| 16 | Watford (R) | 46 | 13 | 16 | 17 | 59 | 77 | 0.766 | 42 | Relegation to the Fourth Division |
| 17 | Shrewsbury Town (R) | 46 | 15 | 10 | 21 | 49 | 71 | 0.690 | 40 | Relegation to the Fourth Division |

(R) Relegated

==== Results by matchday ====
| Round | 1 | 2 | 3 | 4 | 5 | 6 | 7 | 8 | 9 | 10 | 11 | 12 | 13 | 14 | 15 | 16 | 17 | 18 | 19 | 20 | 21 | 22 | 23 | 24 | 25 | 26 | 27 | 28 | 29 | 30 | 31 | 32 | 33 | 34 | 35 | 36 | 37 | 38 | 39 | 40 | 41 | 42 | 43 | 44 | 45 | 46 |
|---|---|---|---|---|---|---|---|---|---|---|---|---|---|---|---|---|---|---|---|---|---|---|---|---|---|---|---|---|---|---|---|---|---|---|---|---|---|---|---|---|---|---|---|---|---|---|
| Ground | A | A | H | H | A | A | H | H | A | H | H | A | A | H | A | H | A | A | A | H | H | H | A | H | A | A | H | A | H | A | H | H | A | H | A | H | H | A | A | H | H | A | H | H | A | A |
| Result | W | L | W | D | L | W | W | W | L | W | D | D | L | W | W | W | D | L | L | D | W | W | L | L | D | D | D | W | W | L | L | L | L | W | L | W | L | L | L | W | D | L | L | D | L | L |
| Position | 1 | 12 | 5 | 5 | 10 | 6 | 3 | 2 | 4 | 2 | 2 | 3 | 7 | 6 | 4 | 3 | 5 | 5 | 6 | 6 | 5 | 4 | 5 | 9 | 7 | 7 | 9 | 7 | 7 | 8 | 10 | 11 | 11 | 11 | 12 | 13 | 13 | 13 | 13 | 13 | 13 | 13 | 15 | 14 | 15 | 15 |
| Points | 2 | 2 | 4 | 5 | 5 | 7 | 9 | 11 | 11 | 13 | 14 | 15 | 15 | 17 | 19 | 21 | 22 | 22 | 22 | 23 | 25 | 27 | 27 | 27 | 28 | 29 | 30 | 32 | 34 | 34 | 34 | 34 | 34 | 36 | 36 | 38 | 38 | 38 | 38 | 40 | 41 | 41 | 41 | 42 | 42 | 42 |

Source: Statto
A = Away; H = Home; W = Win; D = Draw; L = Loss

==== Matches ====
| 24 August 1957 1 | Aldershot | 0–1 | Port Vale | Aldershot |
| | | Report | Steele | Stadium: Recreation Ground; Attendance: 6,802 |

| 26 August 1957 2 | Shrewsbury Town | 1–0 | Port Vale | Shrewsbury |
| | | Report | | Stadium: Gay Meadow; Attendance: 9,869 |

| 31 August 1957 3 | Port Vale | 3–1 | Swindon Town | Burslem |
| | Steele 12', 18'; Wilkinson 38' | Report | Richards 70' | Stadium: Vale Park; Attendance: 16,503; Referee: J.H. Clough |

| 2 September 1957 4 | Port Vale | 0–0 | Shrewsbury Town | Burslem |
| | | Report | | Stadium: Vale Park; Attendance: 15,538 |

| 7 September 1957 5 | Millwall | 2–1 | Port Vale | New Cross, Lewisham |
| | | Report | Poole | Stadium: The Den; Attendance: 17,429 |

| 11 September 1957 6 | Southampton | 0–3 | Port Vale | Southampton |
| | | Report | Steele; Poole; Askey | Stadium: The Dell; Attendance: 18,887 |

| 14 September 1957 7 | Port Vale | 2–0 | Gillingham | Burslem |
| | Poole | Report | | Stadium: Vale Park; Attendance: 14,717 |

| 16 September 1957 8 | Port Vale | 4–0 | Southampton | Burslem |
| | Steele; Wilkinson | Report | | Stadium: Vale Park; Attendance: 11,021 |

| 21 September 1957 9 | Exeter City | 1–0 | Port Vale | Exeter |
| | Robinson | Report | | Stadium: St James Park; Attendance: 9,397 |

| 28 September 1957 10 | Port Vale | 2–1 | Queens Park Rangers | Burslem |
| | Steele; Hayward | Report | Locke | Stadium: Vale Park; Attendance: 12,816 |

| 30 September 1957 11 | Port Vale | 2–2 | Newport County | Burslem |
| | Poole | Report | Terry; Harris | Stadium: Vale Park; Attendance: 8,669 |

| 5 October 1957 12 | Southend United | 1–1 | Port Vale | Southend-on-Sea |
| | | Report | Steele | Stadium: Roots Hall; Attendance: 11,943 |

| 12 October 1957 13 | Reading | 3–0 | Port Vale | Reading, Berkshire |
| | | Report | | Stadium: Elm Park; Attendance: 11,501 |

| 19 October 1957 14 | Port Vale | 3–0 | Northampton Town | Burslem |
| | Steele; Wilkinson | Report | | Stadium: Vale Park; Attendance: 12,443; Referee: Les Hamer |

| 26 October 1957 15 | Watford | 0–2 | Port Vale | Watford |
| | | Report | Wilkinson; Askey | Stadium: Vicarage Road; Attendance: 9,513 |

| 2 November 1957 16 | Port Vale | 4–0 | Crystal Palace | Burslem |
| | Wilkinson; Poole; Askey | Report | | Stadium: Vale Park; Attendance: 13,602 |

| 9 November 1957 17 | Torquay United | 1–1 | Port Vale | Torquay |
| | | Report | Poole | Stadium: Plainmoor; Attendance: 7,620 |

| 11 November 1957 18 | Newport County | 2–1 | Port Vale | Newport, Wales |
| | McSeveney; Rodger | Report | Poole | Stadium: Somerton Park; Attendance: 8,480 |

| 23 November 1957 19 | Colchester United | 2–1 | Port Vale | Colchester |
| | Plant 5'; Williams 45' | Report | Askey 79' | Stadium: Layer Road; Attendance: 9,106; Referee: C. Woan |

| 30 November 1957 20 | Port Vale | 2–2 | Norwich City | Burslem |
| | Steele; Poole | Report | | Stadium: Vale Park; Attendance: 13,816 |

| 14 December 1957 21 | Port Vale | 2–1 | Walsall | Burslem |
| | Wilkinson; Poole | Report | | Stadium: Vale Park; Attendance: 8,827 |

| 21 December 1957 22 | Port Vale | 6–1 | Aldershot | Burslem |
| | Wilkinson; Poole; Cunliffe | Report | | Stadium: Vale Park; Attendance: 8,273 |

| 25 December 1957 23 | Coventry City | 1–0 | Port Vale | Coventry |
| | Straw | Report | | Stadium: Highfield Road; Attendance: 13,713 |

| 26 December 1957 24 | Port Vale | 0–1 | Coventry City | Burslem |
| | | Report | Smith | Stadium: Vale Park; Attendance: 17,286 |

| 28 December 1957 25 | Swindon Town | 0–0 | Port Vale | Swindon |
| | | Report | | Stadium: County Ground; Attendance: 15,000; Referee: G.W. Pullin |

| 4 January 1958 26 | Brighton & Hove Albion | 0–0 | Port Vale | Hove |
| | | Report | | Stadium: Goldstone Ground; Attendance: 13,312 |

| 11 January 1958 27 | Port Vale | 1–1 | Millwall | Burslem |
| | Steele | Report | | Stadium: Vale Park; Attendance: 9,002 |

| 18 January 1958 28 | Gillingham | 0–2 | Port Vale | Gillingham, Kent |
| | | Report | Wilkinson; Steele | Stadium: Priestfield Stadium; Attendance: 7,407 |

| 1 February 1958 29 | Port Vale | 3–2 | Exeter City | Burslem |
| | Wilkinson; Cunliffe | Report | Calland | Stadium: Vale Park; Attendance: 9,300 |

| 8 February 1958 30 | Queens Park Rangers | 2–1 | Port Vale | Shepherd's Bush, West London |
| | Cameron; Longbottom | Report | Askey | Stadium: Loftus Road; Attendance: 7,594 |

| 15 February 1958 31 | Port Vale | 1–3 | Southend United | Burslem |
| | Wilkinson | Report | | Stadium: Vale Park; Attendance: 7,642 |

| 22 February 1958 32 | Port Vale | 1–2 | Reading | Burslem |
| | Steele | Report | | Stadium: Vale Park; Attendance: 5,940 |

| 1 March 1958 33 | Northampton Town | 3–2 | Port Vale | Northampton |
| | B.Hawkings; O'Neil | Report | Steele | Stadium: County Cricket Ground; Attendance: 8,711 |

| 8 March 1958 34 | Port Vale | 5–0 | Watford | Burslem |
| | Kinsey; Wilkinson; Steele; Whalley | Report | | Stadium: Vale Park; Attendance: 8,515 |

| 15 March 1958 35 | Crystal Palace | 1–0 | Port Vale | Selhurst, Croydon |
| | | Report | | Stadium: Selhurst Park; Attendance: 13,577 |

| 22 March 1958 36 | Port Vale | 2–0 | Colchester United | Burslem |
| | Steele; Wilkinson | Report | | Stadium: Vale Park; Attendance: 7,151 |

| 24 March 1958 37 | Port Vale | 0–1 | Brentford | Burslem |
| | | Report | Towers | Stadium: Vale Park; Attendance: 5,149 |

| 29 March 1958 38 | Walsall | 3–0 | Port Vale | Walsall |
| | | Report | | Stadium: Fellows Park; Attendance: 8,613 |

| 4 April 1958 39 | Plymouth Argyle | 1–0 | Port Vale | Plymouth |
| | Kearns | Report | | Stadium: Home Park; Attendance: 22,458 |

| 5 April 1958 40 | Port Vale | 2–1 | Torquay United | Burslem |
| | Sproson; Wilkinson | Report | | Stadium: Vale Park; Attendance: 7,504 |

| 7 April 1958 41 | Port Vale | 0–0 | Plymouth Argyle | Burslem |
| | | Report | | Stadium: Vale Park; Attendance: 11,059 |

| 12 April 1958 42 | Norwich City | 3–0 | Port Vale | Norwich |
| | | Report | | Stadium: Carrow Road; Attendance: 17,843 |

| 19 April 1958 43 | Port Vale | 2–3 | Bournemouth & Boscombe Athletic | Burslem |
| | Steele; Cunliffe | Report | | Stadium: Vale Park; Attendance: 8,481 |

| 23 April 1958 44 | Port Vale | 2–2 | Brighton & Hove Albion | Burslem |
| | Poole; Askey | Report | | Stadium: Vale Park; Attendance: 7,256 |

| 26 April 1958 45 | Brentford | 4–1 | Port Vale | Brentford, West London |
| | Towers; Rainford | Report | Steele | Stadium: Griffin Park; Attendance: 11,923 |

| 30 April 1958 46 | Bournemouth & Boscombe Athletic | 3–1 | Port Vale | Bournemouth |
| | | Report | Wilkinson | Stadium: Dean Court; Attendance: 10,683 |

=== FA Cup ===
| 16 November 1957 R1 | Port Vale | 2–1 | Shrewsbury Town | Burslem |
| | Wilkinson | Report | | Stadium: Vale Park; Attendance: 17,660 |

| 7 December 1957 R2 | Port Vale | 2–2 | Hull City | Burslem |
| 14:15 GMT | Poole; Askey | Report | Davidson 72'; Bradbury 80' | Stadium: Vale Park; Attendance: 14,338 |

| 9 December 1957 Replay | Hull City | 4–3 (a.e.t.) | Port Vale | Kingston upon Hull |
| 19:15 GMT | 34' (og.); Bulless 36'; Bradbury 85', 109' | Report | Poole; Steele; Sproson | Stadium: Boothferry Park; Attendance: 17,403 |

== Squad statistics ==
=== Appearances and goals ===
Key to positions: GK – Goalkeeper; FB – Full back; HB – Half back; FW – Forward

| No. | Pos | Nat | Player | Total | | Third Division South | | FA Cup | |
| No. | Pos | Nat | Player | Apps | Goals | Apps | Goals | Apps | Goals |
|---|---|---|---|---|---|---|---|---|---|
| | GK | (Wales) WAL | Keith Jones | 46 | 0 | 43 | 0 | 3 | 0 |
| | GK | (England) ENG | John Poole | 3 | 0 | 3 | 0 | 0 | 0 |
| | FB | (England) ENG | Jimmy Adams | 1 | 0 | 1 | 0 | 0 | 0 |
| | FB | (England) ENG | Fred Donaldson | 27 | 0 | 27 | 0 | 0 | 0 |
| | FB | (England) ENG | David Raine | 34 | 0 | 31 | 0 | 3 | 0 |
| | FB | (England) ENG | Selwyn Whalley | 13 | 1 | 13 | 1 | 0 | 0 |
| | HB | (Scotland) SCO | Bert Carberry | 32 | 0 | 29 | 0 | 3 | 0 |
| | HB | (England) ENG | Bill Cleary | 10 | 0 | 8 | 0 | 2 | 0 |
| | HB | (England) ENG | Albert Leake | 34 | 0 | 32 | 0 | 2 | 0 |
| | HB | (England) ENG | Alan Martin | 3 | 0 | 3 | 0 | 0 | 0 |
| | HB | (England) ENG | Terry Miles | 6 | 0 | 6 | 0 | 0 | 0 |
| | HB | (England) ENG | Roy Sproson | 40 | 2 | 37 | 1 | 3 | 1 |
| | FW | (England) ENG | Colin Askey | 37 | 7 | 35 | 6 | 2 | 1 |
| | FW | (England) ENG | John Cunliffe | 45 | 4 | 42 | 4 | 3 | 0 |
| | FW | (England) ENG | Basil Hayward | 45 | 1 | 42 | 1 | 3 | 0 |
| | FW | (England) ENG | Fred Hough | 4 | 0 | 4 | 0 | 0 | 0 |
| | FW | (Wales) WAL | Noel Kinsey | 14 | 2 | 14 | 2 | 0 | 0 |
| | FW | (Scotland) SCO | Jimmy McLean | 3 | 0 | 3 | 0 | 0 | 0 |
| | FW | (England) ENG | Harry Poole | 44 | 16 | 41 | 14 | 3 | 2 |
| | FW | (England) ENG | Stan Steele | 49 | 22 | 46 | 21 | 3 | 1 |
| | FW | (England) ENG | Jack Wilkinson | 44 | 19 | 41 | 17 | 3 | 2 |
Players who featured but departed the club during the season:
| | GK | (England) ENG | Leslie Wood | 0 | 0 | 0 | 0 | 0 | 0 |
| | FW | (England) ENG | Brian Hopkins | 2 | 0 | 2 | 0 | 0 | 0 |
| | FW | (England) ENG | Alan Bennett | 0 | 0 | 0 | 0 | 0 | 0 |
| | FW | (England) ENG | Ken Griffiths | 3 | 0 | 3 | 0 | 0 | 0 |

=== Top scorers ===
| Place | Position | Nation | Name | Third Division South | FA Cup | Total |
|---|---|---|---|---|---|---|
| 1 | FW | England | Stan Steele | 21 | 1 | 22 |
| 2 | FW | England | Jack Wilkinson | 17 | 2 | 19 |
| 3 | FW | England | Harry Poole | 14 | 2 | 16 |
| 4 | FW | England | Colin Askey | 6 | 1 | 7 |
| 5 | FW | England | John Cunliffe | 4 | 0 | 4 |
| 6 | HB | England | Roy Sproson | 1 | 1 | 2 |
| – | FW | Wales | Noel Kinsey | 2 | 0 | 2 |
| 8 | FB | England | Selwyn Whalley | 1 | 0 | 1 |
| – | FW | England | Basil Hayward | 1 | 0 | 1 |
| – | – | – | Own goals | 0 | 0 | 0 |
| | | | TOTALS | 67 | 7 | 74 |

== Transfers ==
=== Transfers in ===
| Date from | Position | Nationality | Name | From | Fee | Ref. |
|---|---|---|---|---|---|---|
| June 1957 | FW | ENG | Jack Wilkinson | Sheffield United | Free transfer | |
| July 1957 | HB | SCO | Bert Carberry | Gillingham | Free transfer | |
| July 1957 | GK | WAL | Keith Jones | Aston Villa | £3,500 | |
| July 1957 | HB | ENG | Alan Martin | Bangor City | Non-contract | |
| November 1957 | HB | ENG | Bill Cleary | Wisbech Town | Free transfer | |
| February 1958 | FW | WAL | Noel Kinsey | Birmingham City | £5,000 | |
| March 1958 | FW | SCO | Jimmy McLean | Alva Rangers | Free transfer | |

=== Transfers out ===
| Date from | Position | Nationality | Name | To | Fee | Ref. |
|---|---|---|---|---|---|---|
| September 1957 | FW | ENG | Alan Bennett | Crewe Alexandra | Free transfer | |
| January 1958 | FW | ENG | Ken Griffiths | Mansfield Town | 'four-figure fee' | |
| January 1958 | GK | ENG | Leslie Wood | Southport | Free transfer | |
| March 1958 | FW | ENG | Brian Hopkins | Burton Albion | Free transfer | |
| May 1958 | FW | ENG | Basil Hayward | Portsmouth | 'fair' | |
| May 1958 | FW | ENG | Fred Hough | | Released | |
| July 1958 | FW | ENG | Colin Askey | Walsall | 'fairly substantial' | |
| July 1958 | HB | ENG | Bill Cleary | Boston United | Free transfer | |
| August 1957 | HB | SCO | Bert Carberry | Exeter City | Free transfer | |
