= Jimmy McLean =

Scottish footballer

Personal information
- Full name: James McLean
- Date of birth: 3 April 1934
- Place of birth: Stirling, Scotland
- Date of death: 27 August 1995 (aged 61)
- Place of death: Dunfermline, Scotland
- Position: Inside right

Youth career
- Alva Rangers

Senior career*
Years	Team	Apps	(Gls)
1958–1960	Port Vale	3	(0)
1960	→ Southport (loan)	0	(0)
- Wellington Town
1961	Witton Albion		
- * Club domestic league appearances and goals

James McLean (3 April 1934 – 27 August 1995) was a Scottish footballer who played at inside-right for Port Vale, Southport, Wellington Town, and Witton Albion.

== Career ==
Mclean played for Alva Rangers before joining Port Vale in March 1958. He played three Third Division South games under Norman Low in the 1957–58 season. He did not play another game for the club, and a two-month loan spell with Fourth Division side Southport in January 1960 could not revitalize his career. After being released from his contract at Vale Park at the end of the 1959–60 season, he moved on to Wellington Town of the Southern League, and then Cheshire County League club Witton Albion. He made his Witton debut on 21 January 1961 and ended the 1960–61 season with nine goals in 18 games. Upon his retirement from the game, he became a keen Port Vale supporter.

== Career statistics ==
Appearances and goals by club, season and competition
Club	Season	League			FA Cup		Total	
Club	Season	Division	Apps	Goals	Apps	Goals	Apps	Goals
Port Vale	1957–58	Third Division South	3	0	0	0	3	0
Port Vale	1958–59	Fourth Division	0	0	0	0	0	0
Port Vale	1959–60	Third Division	0	0	0	0	0	0
Port Vale	Total		3	0	0	0	3	0
Southport (loan)	1959–60	Fourth Division	0	0	0	0	0	0
Witton Albion	1960–61	Cheshire County League					18	9
