= Bill Cleary (footballer, born 1931) =

Footballer (1931–1991)

Personal information
- Full name: William Cleary
- Date of birth: 20 April 1931
- Place of birth: England
- Date of death: 12 March 1991 (aged 59)
- Position: Half-back

Youth career
- South Bank East End
- Sunderland

Senior career*
Years	Team	Apps	(Gls)
1953–1956	Norwich City	18	(0)
- Wisbech Town
1957–1958	Port Vale	8	(0)
	Boston United	0	(0)
- Wisbech Town
- King's Lynn
Total		26+	(0+)

Managerial career
- Wisbech Town
- * Club domestic league appearances and goals

William Cleary (20 April 1931 – 12 March 1991) was an English footballer who played at half-back for Sunderland, Norwich City, Wisbech Town, Port Vale, Boston United, and King's Lynn.

== Career ==
Cleary played for South Bank East End and Sunderland (without making a first-team appearance) before joining Norman Low's Norwich City in 1953. He played 18 Third Division South games for the "Canaries", as the Carrow Road club posted mid-table finishes in 1953–54, 1954–55, and 1955–56. He then played non-League football for Wisbech Town. He was signed again by Norman Low, now manager of Port Vale, in November 1957. He played eight Third Division South and two FA Cup games in the 1957–58 season. Still, he failed to nail down a regular slot at Vale Park. He was transferred to Southern League side Boston United in July 1958. He moved on to King's Lynn, before returning to old club Wisbech Town. He became a coach, manager, and finally a director at the club.

== Career statistics ==
Appearances and goals by club, season and competition
Club	Season	League			FA Cup		Total	
Club	Season	Division	Apps	Goals	Apps	Goals	Apps	Goals
Norwich City	1953–54	Third Division South	4	0	1	0	5	0
Norwich City	1954–55	Third Division South	9	0	2	0	11	0
Norwich City	1955–56	Third Division South	5	0	0	0	5	0
Norwich City	Total		18	0	3	0	21	0
Port Vale	1957–58	Third Division South	8	0	2	0	10	0
Boston United	1958–59	Southern League North-West	0	0	0	0	0	0
