= The End of the Road (1936 film) =

1936 Harry Lauder film directed by Alex Bryce

- Harry Lauder in the film
- Directed by: Alex Bryce
- Written by: Edward Dryhurst
- Produced by: John Findlay
- Starring: Harry Lauder; Ruth Haven; Ethel Glendinning; Bruce Seton
- Cinematography: Jack Parker
- Production company: Twentieth Century Fox
- Distributed by: Twentieth Century Fox
- Release date: December 1936
- Running time: 72 minutes
- Country: United Kingdom
- Language: English

The End of the Road is a 1936 British musical comedy drama film directed by Alex Bryce and starring Harry Lauder, Bruce Seton, Ruth Haven and Ethel Glendinning." It was written by Edward Dryhurst and made at Wembley Studios by the British subsidiary of the Hollywood company Twentieth Century Fox.

== Preservation status ==
The British Film Institute National Archive holds a collection of stills but no film or video materials.

== Plot ==
After she marries a drunken wastrel, the daughter of the manager at a Scottish concert party is thrown out by him.

== Cast ==
- Harry Lauder as John MacGregor
- Ruth Haven as Sheila MacGregor
- Ethel Glendinning as Jean MacGregor
- Bruce Seton as Donald Carson
- Margaret Moffatt as Maggie
- Campbell Gullan as David
- Vera Lennox as Flo
- Johnnie Schofield as Jock
- Tully Comber as Alan Cameron

== Reception ==
The Monthly Film Bulletin wrote: "The plot serves naturally to introduce a number of Harry Lauder's characteristic songs, but it is far from being merely a 'vehicle' for them. Apart from one or two weaknesses in casting, the supporting cast act well. The photography is good, though the quality of the outdoor shots is a little harsh in comparison with those taken in the studio. The settings are pleasingly simple and help to give that air of genuineness which pervades the picture."

The Daily Film Renter wrote: "This Wembley production weaves an unsophisticated story arcund the personality of Harry Lauder, and exploits a successful formula in which naive comedy, moments of pathos, and human appeal all have their place, the whole being admirably keyed together by a series of Sir Harry Lauder's inimitable compositions, put over with a verve and gusto, surprising in a man of his age."

Picturegoer wrote: "The appeal of this picture lies in the appearance of the famous Scottish musical comedian; it is; in fact, a one-man show. He sings several old favourites and gets a good deal out of his presentation of the character of John MacGregor, the last of a long line of strolling players. ... Exteriors are good, but the rest of the production is very modestly staged. Ruth Haven, Ethel Glendinning, and Bruce Seton give the star the necessary support."

Picture Show wrote: "The star sings with gusto and gives a breezy performance. He is competently supported, and the film is competently set and photographed."
