= Harry Lauder =

Scottish entertainer (1870–1950)

Sir Harry Lauder
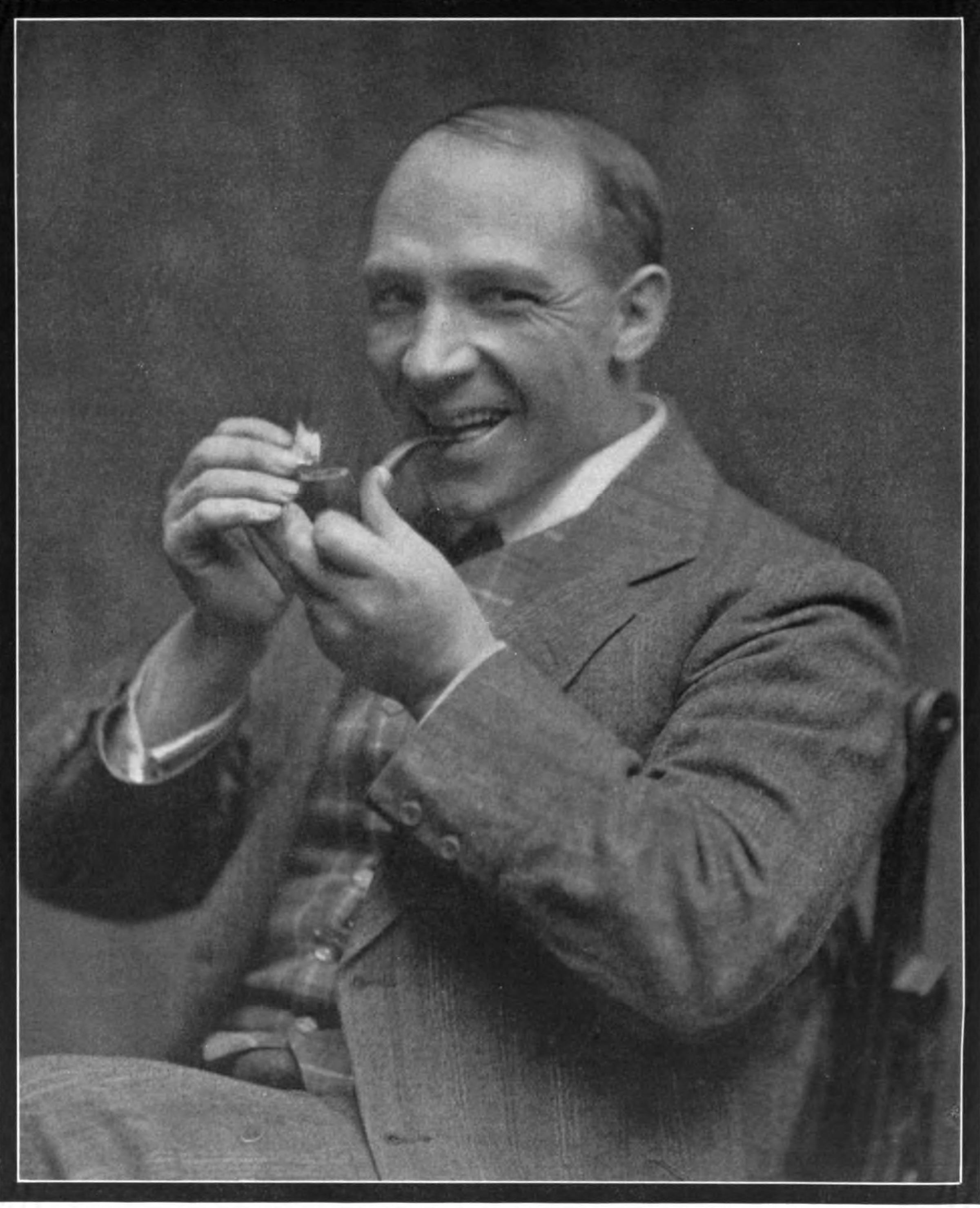
- Lauder in 1909

Background information
- Born: Harry Lauder; 4 August 1870; Portobello, Edinburgh, Scotland
- Died: 26 February 1950 (aged 79) Strathaven, Lanarkshire, Scotland
- Occupations: Singer, actor, comedian
- Years active: 1894–1935
- Spouse: Ann Vallance (m. 1891; died 1927)

Sir Harry Lauder (/ˈlɔːdər/; 4 August 1870 – 26 February 1950) was a Scottish singer, comedian and actor. Popular in both music hall and vaudeville theatre traditions; he achieved international success.

He was described by Sir Winston Churchill as "Scotland's greatest ever ambassador", who "by his inspiring songs and valiant life, rendered measureless service to the Scottish race and to the British Empire". He became a familiar worldwide figure deploying his kilt and cromach (walking stick) as icons of Scottishness to huge acclaim, especially in America. Among his most popular songs were "Roamin' in the Gloamin'", "A Wee Deoch-an-Doris", "The End of the Road" and, a particularly big hit for him, "I Love a Lassie".

Lauder's understanding of life, its pathos and joys, earned him his popularity. Beniamino Gigli commended his singing voice and clarity. Lauder usually performed in full Highland regalia—kilt, sporran, tam o' shanter, and twisted walking stick, and sang Scottish-themed songs. By 1911 Lauder had become the highest-paid performer in the world, and was the first artist from both Britain and Scotland to sell a million records; by 1928 he had sold double that. He raised vast amounts of money for the war effort during the First World War, for which he was knighted by George V in 1919. He went into semi-retirement in the mid-1930s, but briefly emerged to entertain troops in the Second World War. By the late 1940s he was suffering from long periods of ill-health; he died in his native Scotland in 1950.

== Early life ==
Lauder was born on 4 August 1870 in his maternal grandfather's house in Portobello, Edinburgh, Scotland, the eldest of seven children. By the time of the 1871 census he and his parents were living at 1 Newbigging Veitchs Cottages, Inveresk. His father, John Lauder, was the grandson of George Lauder of Inverleith Mains & the St Bernard's Well estate, Edinburgh. He claimed in his autobiography that his family were descendants of the feudal barons the Lauders of the Bass; and his mother, Isabella Urquhart MacLeod née McLennan, was born in Arbroath to a family from the Black Isle. John and Isabella married on 26 August 1870. Lauder's father moved to Newbold, Derbyshire, in early 1882 to take up a job designing porcelain, but died on 20 April from pneumonia. Isabella, left with little more than John's life insurance proceeds of £15, moved with the children to be with her family in Arbroath. To finance his education beyond age 11, Harry worked part-time at a flax mill. He made his first public appearance, singing, at a variety concert at Oddfellows' Hall in Arbroath when he was 13 years old, winning first prize for the night (a watch).

In 1884 the family went to Hamilton, Lanarkshire, to live with Isabella's brother, Alexander, who found Harry employment at Eddlewood Colliery at ten shillings per week; he kept this job for a decade.

== Career ==
=== Miner ===
On 8 January 1910, the Glasgow Evening Times reported that Lauder had told the New York World that, during his mining career:

I was entombed once for 6 long hours. It seemed like 6 years. There were no visible means of getting out either – we had just to wait. I was once right next to a cave-in when my fire boss was buried alive. As we were working and chatting a big stone twice as big as a trunk came tumbling down on my mate from overhead, doubling him like a jack-knife. It squeezed his face right down on the floor. God knows I wasn't strong enough to lift that rock alone, but by superhuman efforts I did. This gave him a chance to breathe and then I shouted. Some men 70 yards away heard me and came and got him out alive. A chap who worked beside me was killed along with 71 others at Udston, and all they could identify him with was his pin leg. I wasn't there that day.

— Harry Lauder

Lauder said he was "proud to be old coal-miner" and in 1911, became an outspoken advocate, "pleading the cause of the poor pit ponies" to Winston Churchill, when introduced to him at the House of Commons and later reported to the Tamworth Herald that he "could talk for hours about my wee four-footed friends of the mine. But I think I convinced that the time has now arrived when something should be done by the law of the land to improve the lot and working conditions of the patient, equine slaves who assist so materially in carrying on the great mining industry of this country."

=== Performer ===
Lauder often sang to the miners in Hamilton, who encouraged him to perform in local music halls. While singing in nearby Larkhall, he received 5 shillings—the first time he was paid for singing. He received further engagements including a weekly "go-as-you please" night held by Mrs. Christina Baylis at her Scotia Music Hall/Metropole Theatre in Glasgow. She advised him to gain experience by touring music halls around the country with a concert party, which he did. The tour allowed him to quit the coal mines and become a professional singer. Lauder concentrated his repertoire on comedic routines and songs of Scotland and Ireland.

By 1894, Lauder had turned professional and performed local characterisations at small, Scottish and northern English music halls but had ceased the repertoire by 1900. In March of that year, Lauder travelled to London and reduced the heavy dialect of his act which according to a biographer, Dave Russell, "handicapped Scottish performers in the metropolis". He was an immediate success at the Charing Cross Music Hall and the London Pavilion, venues at which the theatrical paper The Era reported that he had generated "great furore" among his audiences with three of his self-composed songs.

=== 1900–1914 ===
Pre–WW1 toy bus with Lauder advert

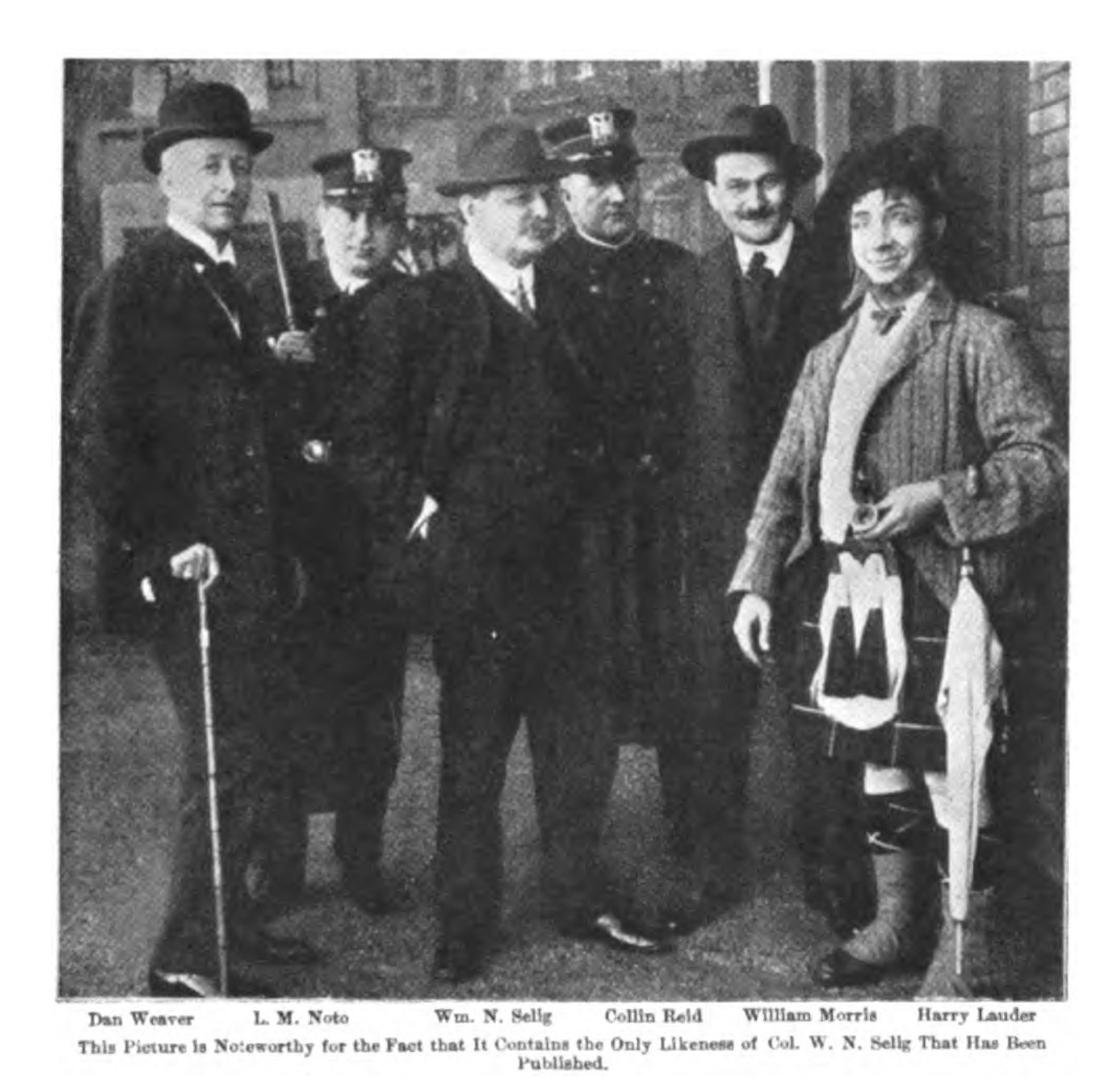
Henry Lauder [at right] Selig Studios

In 1905 Lauder's success in leading the Howard & Wyndham pantomime at the Theatre Royal, Glasgow, for which he wrote I Love a Lassie, made him a national star, and he obtained contracts with Sir Edward Moss and others. Lauder then made a switch from music hall to variety theatre and undertook a tour of America in 1907. The following year, he performed a private show before Edward VII at Sandringham, and in 1911, he again toured the United States where he commanded $1,000 a night.

In 1912, he was top of the bill at Britain's first ever Royal Command Performance, in front of King George V, organised by Alfred Butt. Lauder undertook world tours extensively during his forty-year career, including 22 trips to the United States—for which he had his own railway train, the Harry Lauder Special, and made several trips to Australia, where his brother John had emigrated.

Lauder was, at one time, the highest-paid performer in the world, making the equivalent of £12,700 a night plus expenses. He was paid £1125 for an engagement at the Glasgow Pavilion Theatre in 1913 and was later considered by the press to earn one of the highest weekly salaries by a theatrical performer during the prewar period. In January 1914 he embarked on a tour that included the United States, Australia, New Zealand and Canada.

=== First World War ===
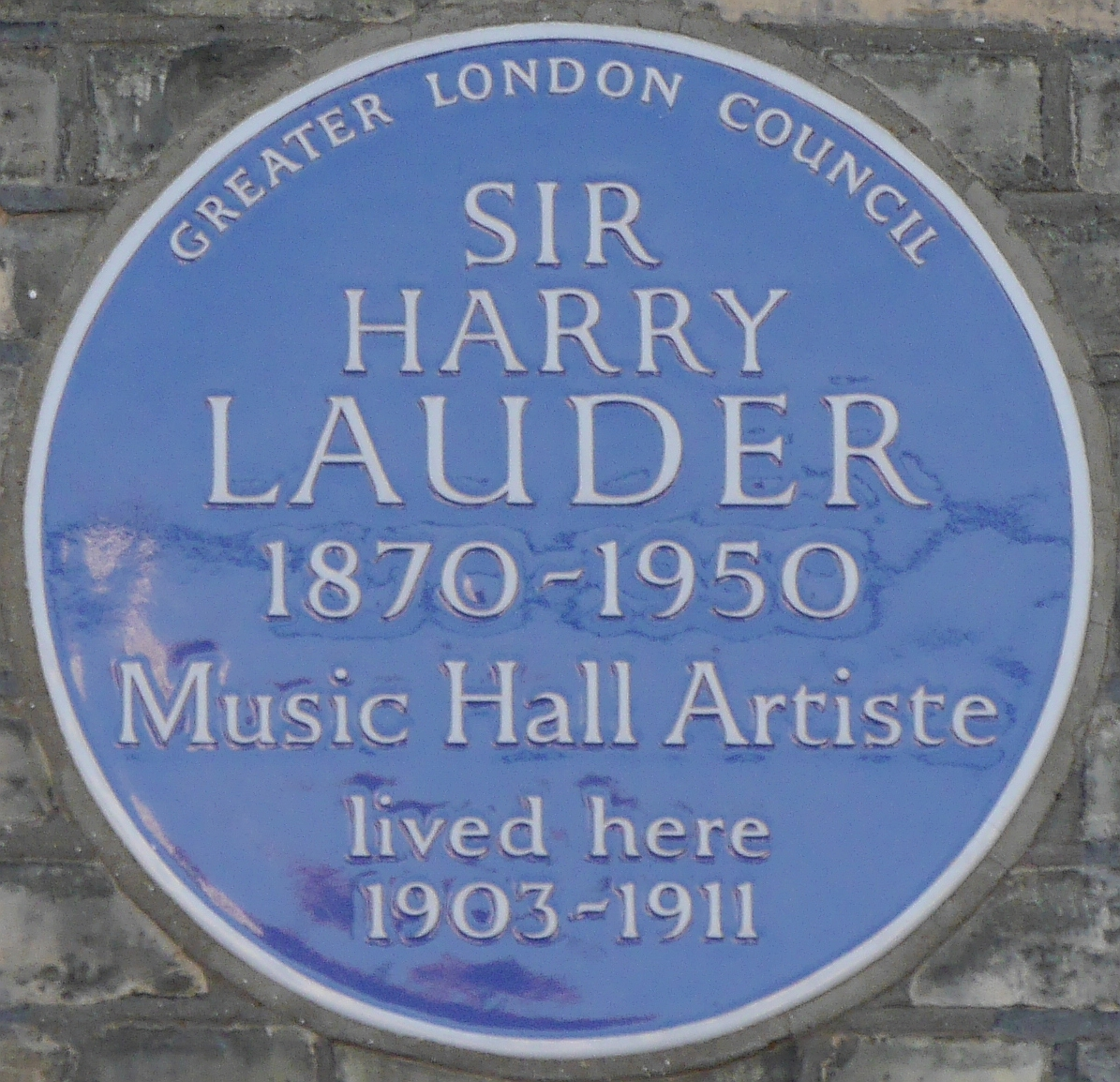
46 Longley Road, Tooting, London blue plaque

The First World War broke out while Lauder was visiting Australia. During the war Lauder promoted recruitment into the services and starred in many concerts for troops at home and abroad. Campaigning for the war effort in 1915, he then wrote "I know that I am voicing the sentiment of thousands and thousands of people when I say that we must retaliate in every possible way regardless of cost. If these German savages want savagery, let them have it".

Following the December 1916 death of his son on the Western Front; Lauder led successful charity fundraising efforts, organised a recruitment tour of music halls and entertained troops in France with a piano. He travelled to Canada in 1917 on a fundraising exercise for the war, where, on 17 November he was guest-of-honour and speaker at the Rotary Club of Toronto Luncheon, when he raised nearly three-quarters of a million dollars' worth of bonds for Canada's Victory Loan. Through his efforts in organising concerts and fundraising appeals he established the charity, the Harry Lauder Million Pound Fund, for maimed Scottish soldiers and sailors, to help servicemen return to health and civilian life; and he was knighted in May 1919 for Empire service during the War.

=== Postwar years ===
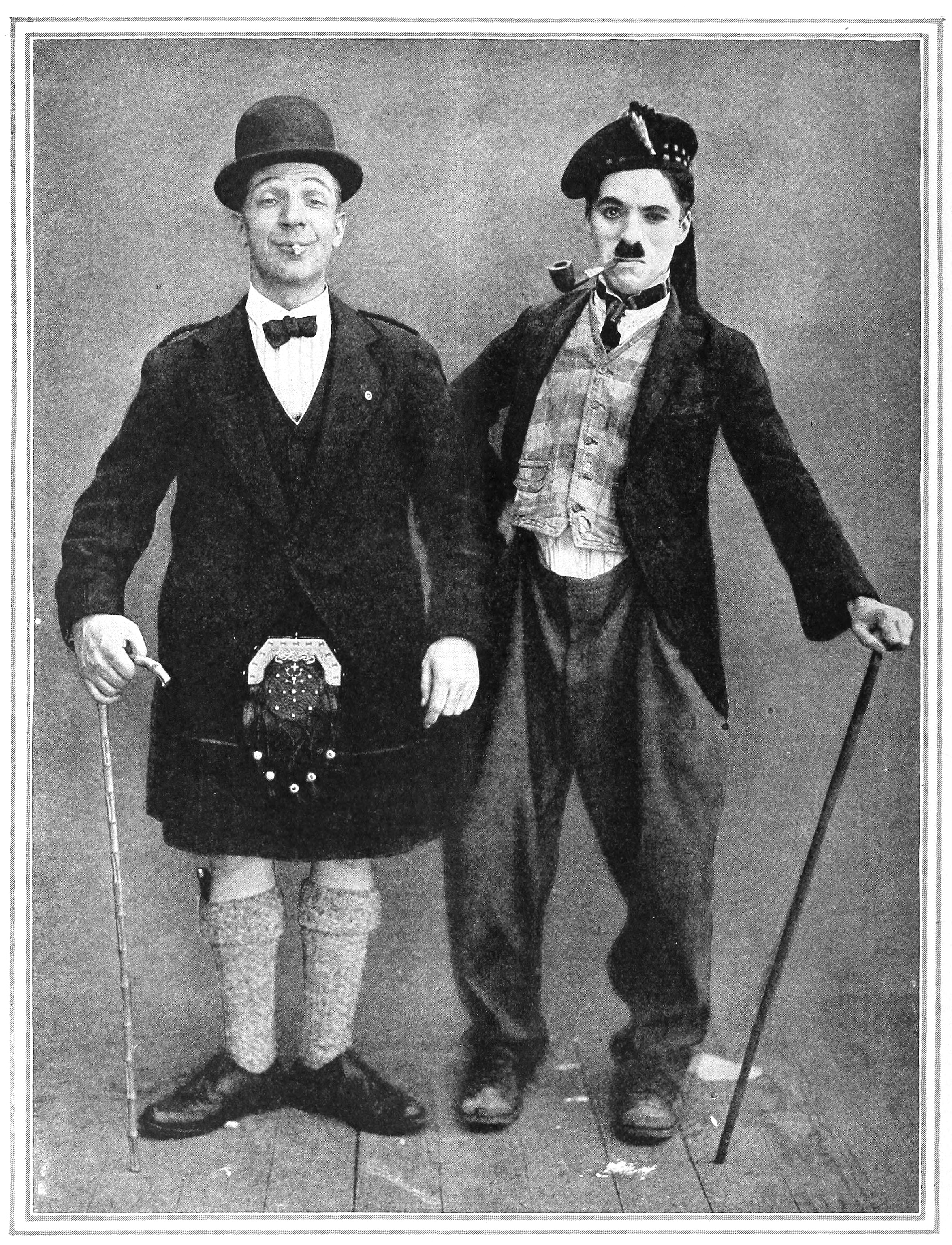
Lauder with Charlie Chaplin, 1918

After the First World War, Lauder continued to tour variety theatre circuits. In January 1918, he famously visited Charlie Chaplin, and the two leading comedy icons of their time acted in a short film together.

His final tour was in North America in 1932. He made plans for a new house at Strathaven, to be built over the site and ruin of an old manor, called Lauder Ha'. He was semi-retired in the mid-1930s, until his final retirement was announced in 1935. He briefly emerged from retirement to entertain troops during the Second World War and make Wireless broadcasts with the BBC Scottish Symphony Orchestra.

=== Australia ===
Possibly Lauder's strongest connections were with Australia. Both Lauder, his wife and son, brother Matt and his wife, were all in Australia when World War I broke out. Their brother John had already emigrated, about 1906, to Kurri Kurri (and, later, Newcastle), New South Wales, and Matt's eldest son John would also emigrate there in 1920. Lauder wrote that "every time I return to Australia I am filled with genuine enthusiasm.....it is one of the very greatest countries in the world."

Lauder was next in Australia (with his wife and her mother) in 1919, arriving at Sydney on 1 March on board the Oceanic Steamship Company's liner S.S. Ventura, from San Francisco, and he was in situ at the Hotel Australia when he was formally notified that he was to be knighted upon his return to Britain. His next visit was in 1923 when his brother John was on hand in Sydney, with their nephew John (Matt's son), to welcome Lauder, his wife and her brother Tom Vallance, after a four-year absence from Australia. He visited and stayed with his brother John in Newcastle on several occasions, two well-known visits being in 1925, when he gave several performances at Newcastle's Victoria Theatre for three weeks commencing on 8 August, and again in 1929 arriving in Newcastle for a brief visit on 25 July. Lauder departed Sydney for the USA on board the liner SS Ventura on Saturday 27 July 1929, a ship he was familiar with. In 1934–5, his brother John spent 10 months with him in Scotland.

=== South Africa ===
Sir Harry Lauder's 1925 reception in South Africa has never been equalled in that country. En route to Australia, he and his wife arrived in Cape Town at Easter. Over twenty thousand people had lined the streets for hours beforehand and it was reported that every policeman in the city plus mounted police were required to keep order. All traffic came to a standstill. He played for two weeks at the Opera House to packed audiences every night, figures "which staggered the management". He moved on to Johannesburg where his reception was equally amazing, described by a reporter who said "never, as long as I live, shall I forget it!"

== Works ==

Lauder wrote most of his own songs, favourites of which were Roamin' In The Gloamin', I Love a Lassie, A Wee Deoch-an-Doris, and Keep Right On to the End of the Road, which is used by Birmingham City Football Club as their club anthem since 1956. He starred in three British films: Huntingtower (1927), Auld Lang Syne (1929) and The End of the Road (1936). He also appeared in a test film for the Photokinema sound-on-disc process in 1921. This film is part of the UCLA Film and Television Archive collection; however, the disc is missing. In 1914, Lauder appeared in 14 Selig Polyscope experimental short sound films. In 1907, he appeared in a short film singing "I Love a Lassie" for British Gaumont. The British Film Institute has several reels of what appears to be an unreleased film All for the Sake of Mary (c. 1920) co-starring Effie Vallance and Harry Vallance.

He wrote a number of books, which ran into several editions, including Harry Lauder at Home and on Tour (1912), A Minstrel in France (1918), Between You and Me (1919), Roamin' in the Gloamin' (1928 autobiography), My Best Scotch Stories (1929), Wee Drappies (1931) and Ticklin' Talks (circa 1932).

== Recordings ==
Lauder made his first recordings, resulting in nine selections, for the Gramophone & Typewriter company early in 1902. He continued to record for Gramophone until the middle of 1905, most recordings appearing on the Gramophone label, but others on Zonophone. He then recorded fourteen selections for Pathé Records June 1906. Two months later he was back at the Gramophone Company, and performed for them in several sessions through 1908. That year he made several two and four-minute cylinders for Edison Records. The next year he recorded for the Victor Talking Machine Company in Camden, New Jersey. He continued to make some cylinders for Edison, but was primarily associated with Gramophone Company/His Master's Voice and their American affiliate, Victor.

In 1910, Victor introduced a mid-priced purple-label series, the first twelve issues of which were by Lauder. In 1927, Victor began issuing Lauder recordings on their premium Red Seal label, making him the only comedic performer to appear on the label primarily associated with classical music and operatic celebrities. Lauder is one of three artists whose records were issued on Victor's black, purple, blue and Red Seal labels (the others being Lucy Isabelle Marsh and Reinald Werrenrath). Lauder's final recordings were made in 1940, but his last recordings were issued as current material when RCA Victor introduced the 45 rpm record in 1949.

== Portraits ==
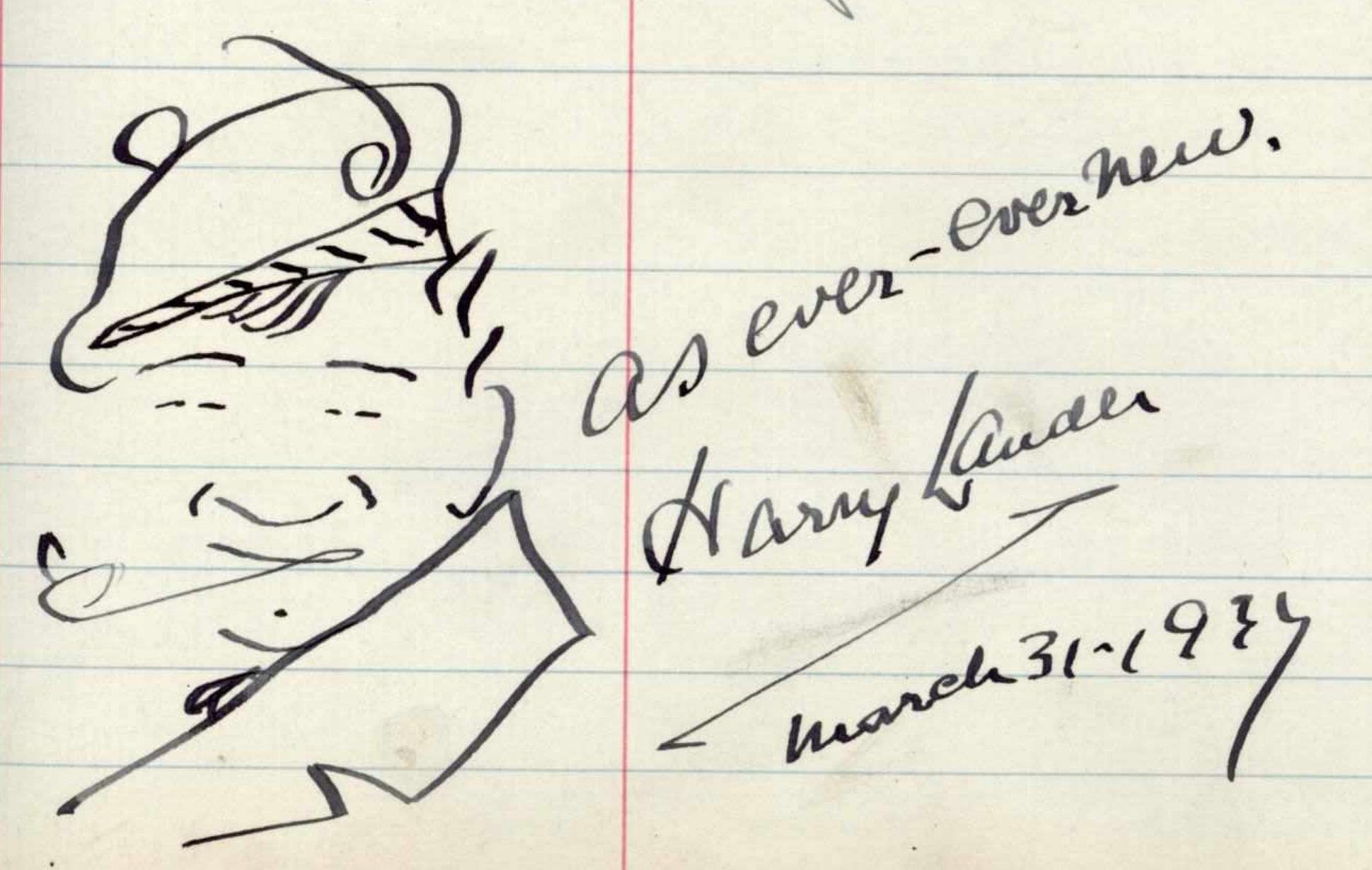
Self portrait and signature of Harry Lauder, 1937

Lauder is credited with giving the then 21-year-old portrait artist Cowan Dobson his opening into society by commissioning him, in 1915, to paint his portrait. This was considered to be so outstanding that another commission came the following year, to paint his son Captain John Lauder, and again another commission in 1921 to paint Lauder's wife, the latter portrait being after the style of John Singer Sargent. These three portraits remain with the family. The same year, Scottish artist James McBey painted another portrait of Lauder, today in the Glasgow Museums.

In the tradition of the magazine Vanity Fair, there appeared numerous caricatures of Lauder. One is by Al Frueh (1880–1968) in 1911 and published in 1913 in the New York World magazine, another by Henry Mayo Bateman, now in London's National Gallery, and one of 1926 by Alick P.F.Ritchie, for Players Cigarettes, today in the London National Portrait Gallery (ref:NPG D2675).

== Personal life ==
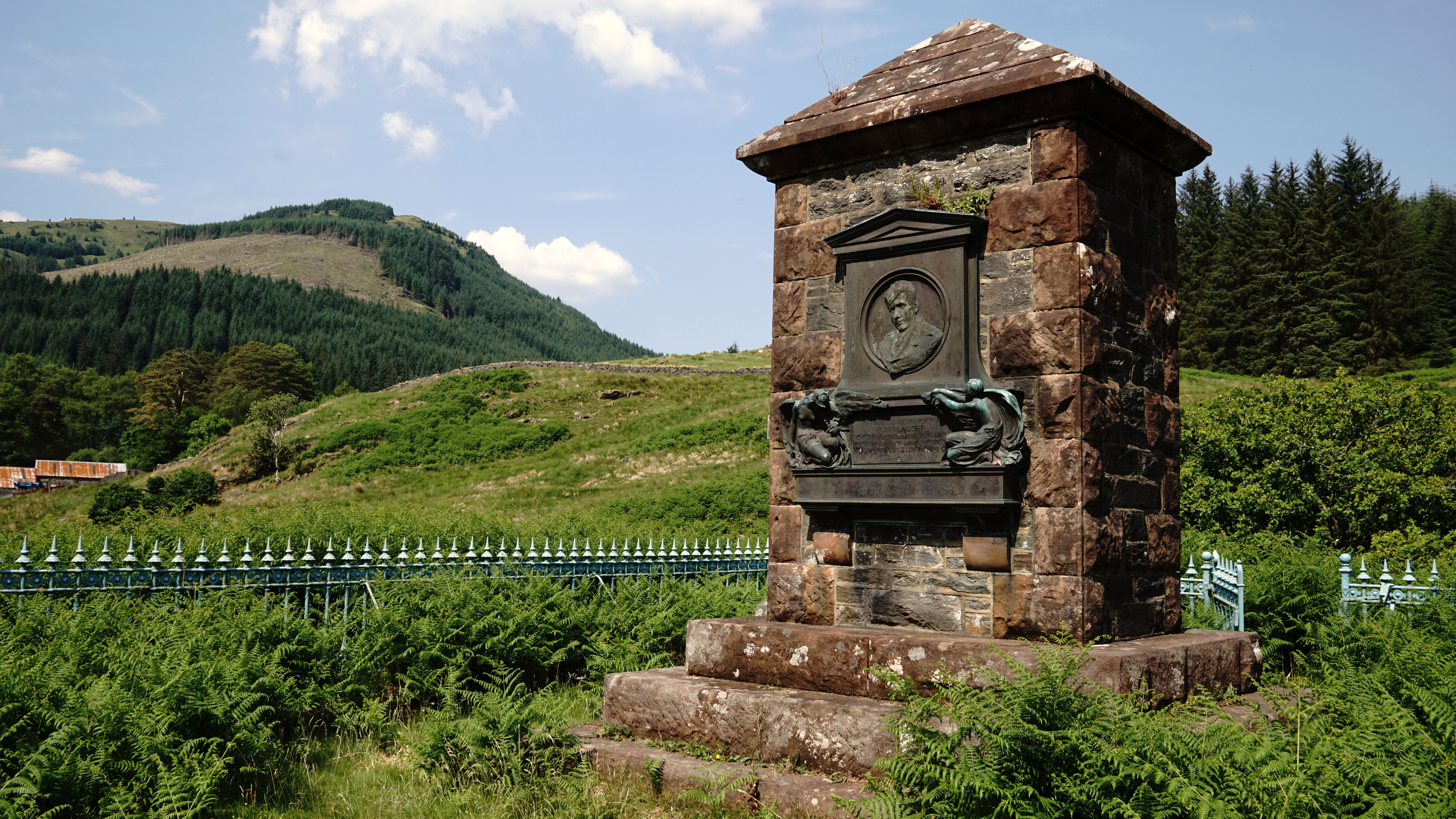
Argyll and Bute – Lauder Memorial, Invernoaden – 20230616152724

On 19 June 1891 Lauder married Ann, daughter of James Vallance, a colliery manager in Hamilton; their only son, Captain John Currie Lauder, was educated at the City of London School followed by a degree from Jesus College, Cambridge. John became a captain in the 8th Argyll and Sutherland Highlanders, and was killed in action on 28 December 1916 at Pozières. Encouraged by Ann, Lauder returned to the stage three days after learning of John's death. He wrote the song "The End of the Road" (published as a collaboration with the American William Dillon, 1924) in the wake of John's death, and built a monument for him in the private Lauder cemetery in Glenbranter. (John Lauder was buried in the war cemetery at Ovillers, France).

Lauder was a devout Christian and with the exception of engagements in the United States never performed on Sundays.

Lady Lauder died on 31 July 1927, at 54, a week after surgery. She was buried next to her son's memorial in the private Lauder cemetery on the 14,000 acre Glenbranter estate in Argyll, where her parents would later join her. Lauder's niece, Margaret (1900–1966), subsequently became his secretary and companion until his death.

Lauder bought the Glenbranter Estate on the Cowal peninsula in Argyll on the 13 October 1916, then sold it to the Forestry Commission in 1921. The estate later became part of the Argyll Forest Park established in 1935. The Invernoaden Estate house, in Glenbranter was demolished in 1956.

== Freemasonry ==
He was initiated a Freemason on 28 January 1897 in Lodge Dramatic, No. 571, (Glasgow, Scotland) and remained an active Freemason for the rest of his life.

== Death ==
Lauder Hall aka Lauder Ha' 1967

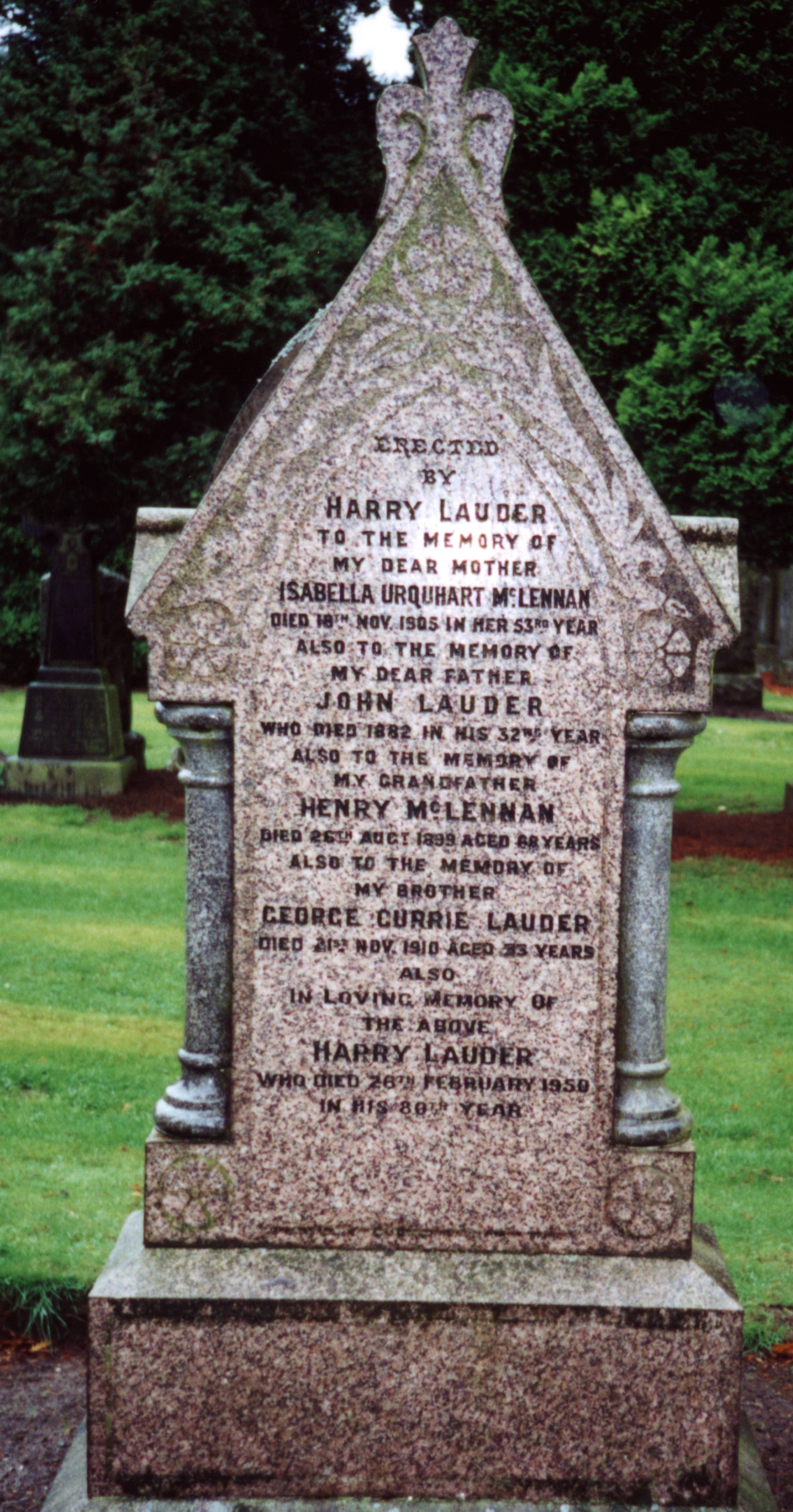
Sir Harry Lauder's Grave, Bent Cemetery, Hamilton, South Lanarkshire

He spent his last years at Lauder Ha (or Hall), his Strathaven home, where he died on 26 February 1950, aged 79. His funeral was held at Cadzow Church in Hamilton on 2 March. It was widely reported, notably by Pathé newsreels. One of the chief mourners was the Duke of Hamilton, a close family friend, who led the funeral procession through Hamilton, and read The Lesson. Wreaths were sent from Queen Elizabeth and Sir Winston Churchill. Lauder was interred with his brother George and their mother in the family plot at Bent Cemetery in Hamilton.

In 1932 he had placed the land at Strathaven where Lauder Hall would stand, and its park, in the name of his niece and secretary, Margaret Lauder to avoid high death duties should he die, as he wanted it preserved as the family seat and a museum to himself. This proved to be a wise move as although he left moveable estate of £358,971, the death duties on this amounted to £207,581. After personal bequests to family totalling £27,000 the residue went to Margaret Lauder.

== In literature and popular culture ==
Lauder's first command performance before Edward VII is satirised by Neil Munro in his Erchie Macpherson story "Harry and the King", first published in the Glasgow Evening News of 14 September 1908.

== Posthumous ==
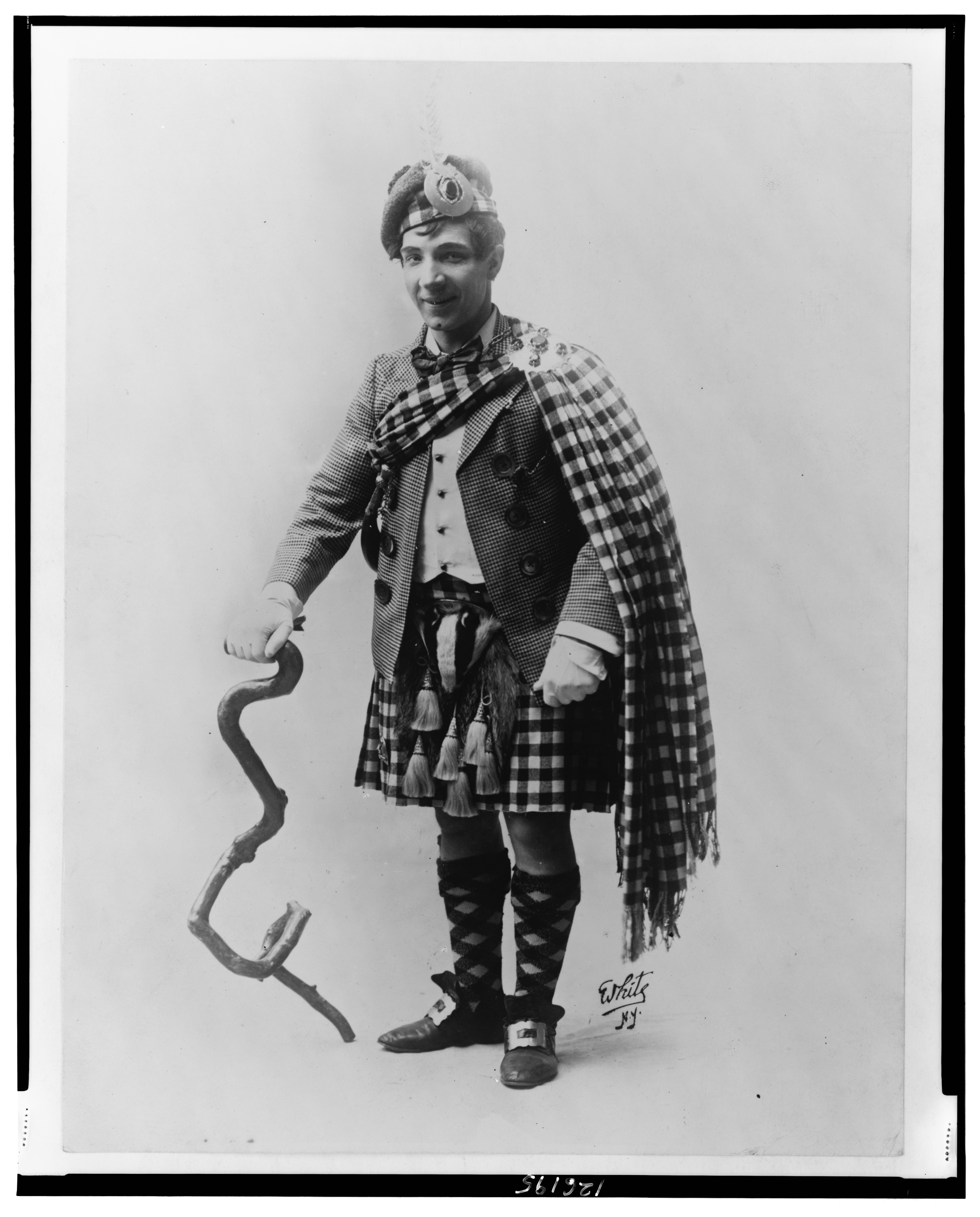
Harry Lauder with his crooked walking stick (full-length portrait, New York, 1906)

In the 1941 film "Babes on Broadway", Mickey Rooney, imitating Lauder, sings "She Is Ma Daisy." In the 1942 film Random Harvest, Greer Garson plays a member of a travelling troupe. She sings "She Is Ma Daisy" and tells jokes doing an impression of Lauder. Websites carry much of his material and the Harry Lauder Collection, amassed by entertainer Jimmy Logan, was bought for the nation and donated to the University of Glasgow. When the A199 Portobello bypass opened, it was named the Sir Harry Lauder Road.

On 28 July 1987, the Lord Provost of Edinburgh hosted a luncheon at the Edinburgh City Chambers to commemorate the 60th Anniversary of Lauder receiving the Freedom of the City attended by his great-nephew Gregory Lauder-Frost. On 4 August 2001 Lauder-Frost opened the Sir Harry Lauder Memorial Garden at Portobello Town Hall. BBC2 Scotland broadcast a documentary, Something About Harry, on 30 November 2005. On 29 September 2007, Lauder-Frost rededicated the Burslem Golf Course & Club at Stoke-on-Trent, which had been formally opened exactly a century before by Harry Lauder.

In the 1990s, samples of recordings of Lauder were used on two tracks recorded by the Scottish folk/dance music artist Martyn Bennett.

The Corkscrew hazel ornamental cultivar of common hazel (Corylus avellana 'Contorta') is sometimes known as Harry Lauder's Walking Stick, in reference to the crooked walking stick Lauder often carried.

== Selected filmography ==
- Huntingtower (1927)
- Auld Lang Syne (1929)
- The End of the Road (1936)
