= Brian Hopkins (footballer) =

English footballer (1933–2024)

Personal information
- Full name: Brian John Hopkins
- Date of birth: 15 March 1933
- Place of birth: Derby, England
- Date of death: 3 January 2024 (aged 90)
- Place of death: Hampshire, England
- Position: Right winger

Youth career
- Keele University

Senior career*
Years	Team	Apps	(Gls)
1957–1958	Port Vale	2	(0)
1958–?	Burton Albion		
- * Club domestic league appearances and goals

Brian John Hopkins (15 March 1933 – 3 January 2024) was an English footballer who played for Port Vale and Burton Albion in the 1950s.

== Career ==
Hopkins played for Keele University before joining Third Division South side Port Vale as an amateur in August 1957. He made his debut at Vale Park in a 6–1 win over Aldershot on 21 December and got his second game in a 1–0 defeat to Coventry City at Highfield Road four days later (Christmas Day). However, he never played for Norman Low's "Valiants" again in the 1957–58 season, and was transferred to Burton Albion of the Birmingham & District League in March 1958.

== Personal life and death ==
Brian John Hopkins was born in Derby, England on 15 March 1933. His younger brother, Colin J. Hopkins (born 1939), was also an amateur football player for Burton Albion. Brian Hopkins died in Hampshire on 3 January 2024, aged 90.

== Career statistics ==
Appearances and goals by club, season and competition
Club	Season	League			FA Cup		Total	
Club	Season	Division	Apps	Goals	Apps	Goals	Apps	Goals
Port Vale	1957–58	Third Division South	2	0	0	0	2	0
