= Gordon Astall =

English footballer (1927–2020)

Personal information
- Full name: Gordon Astall
- Date of birth: 22 September 1927
- Place of birth: Horwich, England
- Date of death: 21 October 2020 (aged 93)
- Place of death: Ipplepen, England
- Height: 5 ft 9 in (1.75 m)
- Position: Outside right

Youth career
- Royal Marines
- Southampton
- Bolton Wanderers (trial)

Senior career*
| Years | Team | Apps | (Gls) |
| 1947–1953 | Plymouth Argyle | 188 | (42) |
| 1953–1961 | Birmingham City | 235 | (60) |
| 1961–1963 | Torquay United | 33 | (10) |
| Total | | 456 | (112) |

International career
| 1952 | England B | 1 | (0) |
| 1956 | England | 2 | (1) |
- * Club domestic league appearances and goals

Gordon Astall (22 September 1927 – 21 October 2020) was an English professional footballer. He played as an outside right, and represented the Football League, the England B team and the full England side. At club level he made 456 appearances in the Football League and scored 112 goals.

== Life and career ==
Astall was born in Horwich, near Bolton, in Lancashire. He was playing amateur football for Southampton when he signed professional with Plymouth Argyle in November 1947. He had previously been an unsuccessful triallist at his local side Bolton Wanderers. His league debut came in February 1948 at home to Luton Town, and he soon became a regular in the Home Park side, helping Plymouth win the Third Division South title in 1952. Due to his speed down the wing the crowd christened him Flash Astall. That same year he was selected for the England B team. In October 1953 he was signed by Second Division rivals Birmingham City for a fee of £14,000, following his Plymouth wing colleague Alex Govan to St Andrew's. He had made 194 appearances for Plymouth and scored 43 goals.

As a goalscoring outside right, Astall replaced the Scot Jackie Stewart in the Birmingham side and quickly became an important member of a team that won the Second Division title in 1955 and reached the 1956 FA Cup final, losing 3–1 at Wembley to Manchester City. Full international recognition followed and he scored on his debut for England against Finland on 20 May 1956. He played again six days later in a 3–1 victory against West Germany, but this proved to be his final international appearance. He also took part in Birmingham's Inter-Cities Fairs Cup campaigns, playing in the 1960 final which the team lost 4–1 on aggregate to Barcelona. At the end of the 1960–61 season, after 271 appearances for Birmingham in which he scored 67 goals, he moved to Torquay United on a free transfer.

Astall made his Gulls debut on 19 August 1961, featuring in a 2–1 defeat at home to Crystal Palace, and went on to score 10 goals in 27 league games in a season that saw Torquay relegated back to the Fourth Division thanks to a 4–2 final-day defeat away to Barnsley, Astall scoring one of Torquay's goals. He played only six times the following season before retiring from the professional game.

Astall settled in the Torbay area, working in insurance and coaching local club Upton Vale. In May 2000, the Torquay Herald Express reported that he was living in retirement in the town and was a keen golfer.

In later life, Astall was diagnosed with dementia. He died at a care home at Ipplepen, Devon, on 21 October 2020 at the age of 93. He was at the time the oldest living England international.

== Career statistics ==
Appearances and goals by club, season and competition
| Club | Season | League | | | FA Cup | | League Cup | | Other | | Total | |
| Club | Season | Division | Apps | Goals | Apps | Goals | Apps | Goals | Apps | Goals | Apps | Goals |
|---|---|---|---|---|---|---|---|---|---|---|---|---|
| Plymouth Argyle | 1947–48 | Second Division | 14 | 1 | 0 | 0 | — | | — | | 14 | 1 |
| Plymouth Argyle | 1948–49 | Second Division | 36 | 5 | 1 | 0 | — | | — | | 37 | 5 |
| Plymouth Argyle | 1949–50 | Second Division | 11 | 0 | 0 | 0 | — | | — | | 11 | 0 |
| Plymouth Argyle | 1950–51 | Third Division South | 30 | 7 | 1 | 0 | — | | — | | 31 | 7 |
| Plymouth Argyle | 1951–52 | Third Division South | 45 | 18 | 1 | 0 | — | | — | | 46 | 18 |
| Plymouth Argyle | 1952–53 | Third Division South | 39 | 10 | 3 | 1 | — | | — | | 42 | 11 |
| Plymouth Argyle | 1953–54 | Third Division South | 13 | 1 | — | | — | | — | | 13 | 1 |
| Plymouth Argyle | Total | | 188 | 42 | 6 | 1 | — | | — | | 194 | 43 |
| Birmingham City | 1953–54 | Second Division | 24 | 6 | 2 | 0 | — | | — | | 26 | 6 |
| Birmingham City | 1954–55 | Second Division | 33 | 11 | 4 | 0 | — | | — | | 37 | 11 |
| Birmingham City | 1955–56 | First Division | 39 | 12 | 6 | 3 | — | | 0 | 0 | 45 | 15 |
| Birmingham City | 1956–57 | First Division | 40 | 11 | 6 | 2 | — | | 1 (Note: Appearance(s) in Inter-Cities Fairs Cup) | 0 | 47 | 13 |
| Birmingham City | 1957–58 | First Division | 37 | 5 | 1 | 0 | — | | 3 | 0 | 41 | 5 |
| Birmingham City | 1957–58 | First Division | 26 | 8 | 5 | 1 | — | | 1 | 0 | 32 | 9 |
| Birmingham City | 1957–58 | First Division | 19 | 4 | 1 | 0 | — | | 2 | 0 | 22 | 4 |
| Birmingham City | 1957–58 | First Division | 17 | 3 | 2 | 0 | 1 | 0 | 1 | 1 | 21 | 4 |
| Birmingham City | Total | | 235 | 60 | 27 | 6 | 1 | 0 | 8 | 1 | 271 | 67 |
| Torquay United | 1961–62 | Third Division | 27 | 10 | 0 | 0 | 1 | 0 | — | | 28 | 10 |
| Torquay United | 1962–63 | Fourth Division | 6 | 0 | 0 | 0 | 0 | 0 | — | | 6 | 0 |
| Torquay United | Total | | 33 | 10 | 0 | 0 | 1 | 0 | — | | 33 | 10 |
| Career total | | | 456 | 112 | 33 | 87 | 2 | 9 | 8 | 1 | 498 | 120 |

== Honours ==
Plymouth Argyle

- Football League Third Division South: 1951–52

Birmingham City

- Football League Second Division: 1954–55
- FA Cup runner-up: 1955–56
- Inter-Cities Fairs Cup runner-up: 1958–60

== Sources ==
- Matthews, Tony (1995). Birmingham City: A Complete Record. Derby: Breedon Books. ISBN 1-85983-010-2.
- Matthews, Tony (2010). Birmingham City: The Complete Record. Derby: Derby Books. ISBN 978-1-85983-853-2.
