= Peter Murphy (footballer, born 1922) =

English footballer

Personal information
- Full name: Peter Murphy
- Date of birth: 7 March 1922
- Place of birth: West Hartlepool, England
- Date of death: 7 April 1975 (aged 53)
- Place of death: Coventry, England
- Position: Inside left

Youth career
- Coventry City
- Birmingham

Senior career*
Years	Team	Apps	(Gls)
1946–1950	Coventry City	115	(37)
1950–1952	Tottenham Hotspur	38	(14)
1952–1960	Birmingham City	244	(106)
Total		397	(157)
- * Club domestic league appearances and goals

Peter Murphy (7 March 1922 – 7 April 1975), often referred to as Spud Murphy, was an English footballer who played as an inside left. He played professionally for three clubs, Coventry City, Tottenham Hotspur and Birmingham City. He is possibly best remembered for the incident in the 1956 FA Cup final when Manchester City's goalkeeper Bert Trautmann broke a bone in his neck when diving at Murphy's feet.

== Life and career ==
Murphy was born in West Hartlepool, County Durham, and moved to Coventry, Warwickshire, with his family when he was four years old. He was with both Coventry City and Birmingham as an amateur footballer before his career was interrupted by the Second World War. He turned professional with Coventry City in May 1946 at the age of 24, making over 100 appearances and scoring at a rate of a goal every three games.

Manager Arthur Rowe took him to Tottenham Hotspur in June 1950 for a fee of £18,500. Murphy scored on his debut in a 4–1 victory over Bolton Wanderers at Burnden Park in August 1950. He played as an inside forward, deputising for the injured Les Bennett in the "push and run" side that won the League championship in 1950–51. On Bennett's return to fitness, Murphy found himself being played out of position on the left wing, so when Birmingham City bid £20,000 for him in January 1952 he was willing enough to drop down a division to return to the Midlands.

When Tommy Briggs left Birmingham later that year, Murphy took up a more attacking role in the team. He was an energetic player with a powerful left-foot shot who was willing to shoot from any distance, and was Birmingham's leading scorer three times, in the 1952–53, 1954–55 and 1957–58 seasons. He retired from playing in 1959 to coach Birmingham's youth team, but was called out of retirement for the last seven games of the season and scored four goals which contributed to the club avoiding relegation to the Second Division.

Murphy scored five goals in Birmingham's run to the 1956 FA Cup final, in which they lost 3–1 to the Don Revie-inspired Manchester City. This match is best remembered for the incident where Manchester City goalkeeper Bert Trautmann was injured when he dived at Murphy's feet to collect the ball, but played on in considerable pain for the last 15 minutes of the match without realising he had broken one of the vertebrae in his neck. The following season Murphy scored another four goals in Birmingham's FA Cup run, which ended this time in semifinal defeat to Manchester United's Busby Babes.

He was also a pioneer of European competition. He played in Birmingham's first match in the 1955–58 Inter-Cities Fairs Cup, when they became the first English club side to participate in Europe, and finished that campaign as the competition's joint leading scorer. He also played in the second leg of the 1960 Inter-Cities Fairs Cup final, which was the first appearance by an English club side in a European final. Birmingham lost 4–1 to Barcelona.

Over his professional career he scored 158 goals in nearly 400 League appearances. For Birmingham his record was 127 goals in 277 games in all competitions, which ranks him third as of 2024, behind Joe Bradford and Trevor Francis, in their all-time scoring charts.

Murphy died in Coventry in 1975 at the age of 53.

== Career statistics ==
Appearances and goals by club, season and competition
Club	Season	League			FA Cup		Other		Total	
Club	Season	Division	Apps	Goals	Apps	Goals	Apps	Goals	Apps	Goals
Coventry City	1946–47	Second Division	11	2	1	0	—		12	2
Coventry City	1947–48	Second Division	29	7	2	0	—		31	7
Coventry City	1948–49	Second Division	36	13	1	0	—		37	13
Coventry City	1949–50	Second Division	39	15	1	0	—		40	15
Coventry City	Total		115	37	5	0	—		120	37
Tottenham Hotspur	1950–51	First Division	25	9	0	0	—		25	9
Tottenham Hotspur	1951–52	First Division	13	5	—		1 (Note: Appearance in FA Charity Shield)	1	14	6
Tottenham Hotspur	Total		38	14	0	0	1	1	39	15
Birmingham City	1951–52	Second Division	15	7	1	0	—		16	7
Birmingham City	1952–53	Second Division	34	20	4	6	—		38	26
Birmingham City	1953–54	Second Division	32	13	2	1	—		34	14
Birmingham City	1954–55	Second Division	37	20	4	0	—		41	20
Birmingham City	1955–56	First Division	38	11	6	5	2 (Note: Appearance(s) in Inter-Cities Fairs Cup)	0	46	16
Birmingham City	1956–57	First Division	35	7	6	4	2	1	43	12
Birmingham City	1957–58	First Division	36	20	1	0	3	3	40	23
Birmingham City	1958–59	First Division	10	4	0	0	1	0	11	4
Birmingham City	1959–60	First Division	7	4	0	0	1	0	8	4
Birmingham City	Total		244	106	24	16	9	4	277	126
Career total			397	157	29	16	10	5	436	178

== Honours ==
Tottenham Hotspur

- Football League First Division: 1950–51

Birmingham City

- Football League Second Division: 1954–55
- FA Cup runner-up: 1955–56
- Inter-Cities Fairs Cup runner-up: 1958–60
