= Noel Kinsey =

Welsh footballer

Personal information
- Full name: Noel Kinsey
- Date of birth: 24 December 1925
- Place of birth: Treorchy, Glamorgan, Wales
- Date of death: 20 May 2017 (aged 91)
- Position: Inside right

Youth career
- Treorchy Amateurs
- Cardiff City

Senior career*
Years	Team	Apps	(Gls)
1947–1953	Norwich City	223	(57)
1953–1958	Birmingham City	149	(48)
1958–1961	Port Vale	72	(6)
Total		444	(111)

International career
1951–1955	Wales	7	(0)
- * Club domestic league appearances and goals

Noel Kinsey (24 December 1925 – 20 May 2017) was a Welsh international footballer who played as an inside right. He won seven international caps and scored 111 goals in 444 league games in a 14-year career in the Football League.

He began his career with Norwich City in 1947, helping the "Canaries" to second place in the Third Division South in 1950–51. He transferred to Birmingham City in 1953, helping the club to the Second Division title in 1954–55. He scored in the 1956 FA Cup final, which ended in a 3–1 defeat to Manchester City. In February 1958, he was signed to Port Vale for a £5,000 fee and helped the "Valiants" to the Fourth Division title in 1958–59. He became a player-coach at Vale Park in May 1960 before departing in April 1962. He later played for non-League sides King's Lynn and Lowestoft Town and worked at Norwich Union Insurance. He entered the Norwich City F.C. Hall of Fame in 2003.

== Club career ==
=== Norwich City ===
Kinsey started his career with Treorchy Amateurs and Cardiff City, before joining Norwich City in 1947. Duggie Lochhead's "Canaries" had to apply for re-election in 1947–48 after finishing second-from-bottom of the Third Division South. They rose to tenth in 1948–49, and then he finished as the club's top scorer in 1949–50 with 17 goals, as the club posted an eleventh-place finish. They reached second place in 1950–51 under new manager Norman Low, but only champions Nottingham Forest were promoted, who finished six points ahead of Norwich. They dropped to third in 1951–52, five points behind champions Plymouth Argyle. They then finished fourth in 1952–53, four points behind champions Bristol Rovers. He scored 57 goals in 223 league appearances at Carrow Road.

=== Birmingham City ===
In 1953, the Welsh international signed with Bob Brocklebank's Birmingham City. The "Blues" finished seventh in the Second Division in 1953–54, before winning the Second Division title in an extremely tight 1954–55 campaign under Arthur Turner's stewardship, finishing above third place Rotherham United on goal average. Kinsey scored 17 goals in 40 games of the club's historic 1955–56 campaign, including a hat-trick against Everton on Boxing Day at St Andrew's. They went on to finish sixth in the First Division, the best finish in the club's history, and also reached the 1956 FA Cup final at Wembley. He scored a 15th-minute equaliser but Manchester City went on to win 3–1 despite goalkeeper Bert Trautmann suffering a serious neck injury, leaving Kinsey with a runners-up medal. Birmingham finished 12th in 1956–57 and 13th in 1957–58. Kinsey scored 55 goals in 173 league and cup competitions for Birmingham City.

=== Port Vale ===
In February 1958, he was signed to Port Vale for a £5,000 fee, in a move that reunited him with former manager Norman Low. He scored twice past Watford in a 5–0 win at Vale Park on 8 March, to finish 1957–58 with two goals in 14 appearances in the last ever season of Third Division South football. He scored three goals in 37 games in 1958–59, as the "Valiants" won the inaugural Fourth Division championship. However, he lost his place in September 1959, and scored once in 19 Third Division games in 1959–60. In May 1960, he signed a player-coach contract, and played just six games in 1960–61. His contract was cancelled by mutual agreement in April 1962, at which point he moved on to King's Lynn of the Southern Football League. He later became the player-coach to Lowestoft Town in the Eastern Counties League.

== International career ==
Kinsey won seven caps for Wales between 1951 and 1955. He featured in qualifying for the 1954 FIFA World Cup, playing in the 2–1 defeat to Northern Ireland at the Racecourse Ground on 31 March 1954.

== Post-retirement and legacy ==
Kinsey ran a pub, before working at Norwich Union Insurance.

He was inducted into the 2003 inaugural Norwich City F.C. Hall of Fame.

Kinsey died at the age of 91 in May 2017.

== Career statistics ==
=== Club statistics ===
Appearances and goals by club, season and competition
Club	Season	League			FA Cup		Other		Total	
Club	Season	Division	Apps	Goals	Apps	Goals	Apps	Goals	Apps	Goals
Norwich City	1947–48	Third Division South	36	1	3	2	—		39	3
Norwich City	1948–49	Third Division South	22	11	2	1	—		24	12
Norwich City	1949–50	Third Division South	37	14	5	3	—		42	17
Norwich City	1950–51	Third Division South	46	13	5	1	—		51	14
Norwich City	1951–52	Third Division South	44	11	3	1	—		47	12
Norwich City	1952–53	Third Division South	38	7	2	0	—		40	7
Norwich City	Total		223	57	20	8	0	0	243	65
Birmingham City	1953–54	Second Division	37	10	2	0	—		39	10
Birmingham City	1954–55	Second Division	35	13	4	1	—		39	14
Birmingham City	1955–56	First Division	34	14	6	3	2 (Note: Appearance(s) in Inter-Cities Fairs Cup)	0	42	17
Birmingham City	1956–57	First Division	28	6	7	3	2	0	37	9
Birmingham City	1957–58	First Division	15	5	1	0	1	0	17	5
Birmingham City	Total		149	48	20	7	5	0	174	55
Port Vale	1957–58	Third Division	14	2	0	0	—		14	2
Port Vale	1958–59	Fourth Division	36	3	1	0	—		37	3
Port Vale	1959–60	Third Division	19	1	1	0	—		20	1
Port Vale	1960–61	Third Division	3	0	0	0	3 (Note: Appearances in League Cup)	1	6	1
Port Vale	1961–62	Third Division	0	0	0	0	0	1	0	0
Port Vale	Total		72	6	2	0	3	1	77	7
Career total			444	111	42	15	8	1	494	127

=== International statistics ===
Wales national team
Year	Apps	Goals
1951	4	0
1952	0	0
1953	0	0
1954	1	0
1955	2	0
Total	7	0

== Honours ==
Birmingham City

- Football League Second Division: 1954–55
- FA Cup runner-up: 1955–56

Port Vale

- Football League Fourth Division: 1958–59

Individual

- Norwich City F.C. Hall of Fame: 2003 inductee
