= 1952–53 Birmingham City F.C. season =

Birmingham City F.C.
1952–53 season
- Chairman: Harry Morris Jr
- Manager: Bob Brocklebank
- Ground: St Andrew's
- Football League Second Division: 6th
- FA Cup: Sixth round
- Top goalscorer: League: Peter Murphy (20); All: Peter Murphy (26)
- Highest home attendance: 52,348 vs Tottenham Hotspur, FA Cup 6th round, 28 February 1953
- Lowest home attendance: 7,119 vs Swansea Town, 11 March 1953
- Average home league attendance: 19,795
Home colours

The 1952–53 Football League season was Birmingham City Football Club's 50th in the Football League and their 22nd in the Second Division. They finished in sixth position in the 22-team division. They entered the 1952–53 FA Cup at the third round proper and lost to Tottenham Hotspur in the sixth round (quarter-final) after two replays.

Twenty-seven players made at least one appearance in nationally organised first-team competition, and there were fifteen different goalscorers. Full-back Ken Green was ever-present through the 49-game season, and Peter Murphy was top scorer with 26 goals, of which 20 came in the league.

== Football League Second Division ==
Date	League position	Opponents	Venue	Result	Score F–A	Scorers	Attendance
23 August 1952	10th	Rotherham United	A	D	1–1	Purdon	15,208
27 August 1952	7th	Luton Town	A	W	1–0	Briggs	20,231
30 August 1952	13th	Fulham	H	L	1–4	Briggs	29,577
3 September 1952	14th	Luton Town	H	D	2–2	Briggs, Murphy	17,478
6 September 1952	9th	West Ham United	A	W	2–1	Higgins, Murphy	23,903
10 September 1952	4th	Leeds United	A	W	1–0	Rowley	14,133
13 September 1952	3rd	Leicester City	H	W	3–1	Briggs, Murphy, Rowley	29,480
17 September 1952	3rd	Leeds United	H	D	2–2	Rowley 2	18,301
20 September 1952	5th	Notts County	A	L	0–2		24,538
27 September 1952	4th	Southampton	H	W	2–0	Rowley 2	21,818
4 October 1952	7th	Bury	A	L	0–3		16,096
11 October 1952	7th	Swansea Town	A	D	1–1	Purdon	21,074
18 October 1952	9th	Huddersfield Town	H	L	0–2		27,484
25 October 1952	7th	Sheffield United	A	D	2–2	Murphy, Wardle	28,345
1 November 1952	8th	Barnsley	H	W	3–1	Murphy, Rowley pen, Stewart	19,927
8 November 1952	8th	Lincoln City	A	D	1–1	Trigg	16,293
15 November 1952	8th	Hull City	H	W	4–3	Trigg pen, Murphy, Stewart, Cox	17,529
22 November 1952	6th	Blackburn Rovers	A	W	2–1	Murphy 2	18,533
29 November 1952	7th	Nottingham Forest	H	L	0–5		17,794
6 December 1952	8th	Everton	A	D	1–1	Murphy	23,858
13 December 1952	5th	Brentford	H	W	3–1	Trigg, Murphy 2	9,963
20 December 1952	4th	Rotherham United	H	W	4–0	Trigg pen, Purdon, Murphy, Wardle	11,978
25 December 1952	3rd	Plymouth Argyle	H	W	4–0	Purdon, Murphy 2, Stewart	31,660
27 December 1952	4th	Plymouth Argyle	A	L	1–2	Trigg pen	25,266
3 January 1953	5th	Fulham	A	L	1–3	Purdon	21,508
17 January 1953	5th	West Ham United	H	W	2–0	Trigg, Purdon	21,733
24 January 1953	5th	Leicester City	A	W	4–3	Murphy 3, Trigg	27,478
7 February 1953	4th	Notts County	H	W	3–2	Trigg 2 (2 pens), Murphy	24,522
21 February 1953	5th	Bury	H	L	0–2		26,051
7 March 1953	7th	Huddersfield Town	A	D	1–1	Ferris	28,636
11 March 1953	7th	Swansea Town	H	L	1–4	Purdon	7,119
14 March 1953	9th	Sheffield United	H	L	1–2	Cox	22,355
21 March 1953	6th	Barnsley	A	W	3–1	Badham, James 2	7,465
28 March 1953	8th	Lincoln City	H	D	2–2	Trigg pen, Stewart	13,429
3 April 1953	8th	Doncaster Rovers	A	L	0–1		18,056
4 April 1953	8th	Hull City	A	L	0–2		23,483
6 April 1953	7th	Doncaster Rovers	H	W	2–1	Lane, Boyd	12,065
11 April 1953	9th	Blackburn Rovers	H	L	1–2	Cox	18,347
15 April 1953	9th	Southampton	A	D	1–1	Warhurst	18,387
18 April 1953	8th	Nottingham Forest	A	W	2–0	Lane, Boyd	16,353
25 April 1953	6th	Everton	H	W	4–2	Boyd 2, Murphy, Stewart	17,083
1 May 1953	6th	Brentford	A	W	2–1	Lane, Murphy	8,565

=== League table (part) ===
Final Second Division table (part)
Pos	Club	Pld	W	D	L	F	A	GA	Pts
4th	Plymouth Argyle	42	20	9	13	65	60	1.08	49
5th	Leicester City	42	18	12	12	89	74	1.20	48
6th	Birmingham City	42	19	10	13	71	66	1.08	48
7th	Nottingham Forest	42	18	8	16	77	67	1.15	44
8th	Fulham	42	17	10	15	81	71	1.14	44
Key	Pos = League position; Pld = Matches played; W = Matches won; D = Matches drawn; L = Matches lost; F = Goals for; A = Goals against; GA = Goal average; Pts = Points								
Source									

== FA Cup ==
Round	Date	Opponents	Venue	Result	Score F–A	Scorers	Attendance
Third round	14 January 1953	Oldham Athletic	A	W	3–1	Murphy 3	26,580
Fourth round	31 January 1953	Sheffield United	A	D	1–1	Purdon	43,104
Fourth round replay	4 February 1953	Sheffield United	H	W	3–1	Murphy 2, Wardle	29,554
Fifth round	14 February 1953	Chelsea	A	W	4–0	Purdon 2, Trigg, Murphy	45,872
Sixth round	28 February 1953	Tottenham Hotspur	H	D	1–1	Wardle	52,348
Sixth round replay	4 March 1953	Tottenham Hotspur	A	D	2–2 aet	Ferris, Boyd	59,543
Sixth round 2nd replay	9 March 1953	Tottenham Hotspur	Molineux, Wolverhampton	L	0–1		50,801

== Appearances and goals ==
Players marked † left the club during the playing season.
Key to positions: GK – Goalkeeper; FB – Full back; HB – Half back; FW – Forward

Players' appearances and goals by competition
Pos.	Nat.	Name	League		FA Cup		Total	
Pos.	Nat.	Name	Apps	Goals	Apps	Goals	Apps	Goals
GK	ENG	Gil Merrick	35	0	7	0	42	0
GK	ENG	Johnny Schofield	7	0	0	0	7	0
FB	ENG	Ken Green	42	0	7	0	49	0
FB	ENG	Jeff Hall	16	0	7	0	23	0
FB	SCO	Roy Martin	24	0	0	0	24	0
HB	ENG	Arthur Atkins	3	0	0	0	3	0
HB	ENG	Jack Badham	18	1	2	0	20	1
HB	ENG	Keith Bannister	14	0	5	0	19	0
HB	ENG	Len Boyd	40	4	7	1	47	5
HB	NIR	Ray Ferris	23	1	7	1	30	2
HB	ENG	Johnny Newman	7	0	0	0	7	0
HB	ENG	Roy Warhurst	31	1	6	0	37	1
HB	ENG	Johnny Watts	3	0	0	0	3	0
FW	ENG	Tommy Briggs †	17	4	0	0	17	4
FW	ENG	Jimmy Cochrane	2	0	0	0	2	0
FW	ENG	Geoff Cox	23	3	0	0	23	3
FW	IRL	Jim Higgins	4	1	0	0	4	1
FW	ENG	John James	3	2	1	0	4	2
FW	ENG	Jackie Lane	6	3	0	0	6	3
FW	ENG	John Metcalfe	2	0	0	0	2	0
FW	ENG	Peter Murphy	34	20	4	6	38	26
FW	ZAF	Ted Purdon	22	7	6	3	28	10
FW	ENG	Ken Rowley	8	7	0	0	8	7
FW	ENG	Bill Smith †	1	0	0	0	1	0
FW	SCO	Jackie Stewart	33	5	7	0	40	5
FW	ENG	Cyril Trigg	19	10	5	1	24	11
FW	ENG	Billy Wardle	25	2	6	2	31	4

== See also ==
- Birmingham City F.C. seasons
