= 1953–54 Birmingham City F.C. season =

Birmingham City F.C.
1953–54 season
- Chairman: Harry Morris Jr
- Manager: Bob Brocklebank
- Ground: St Andrew's
- Football League Second Division: 7th
- FA Cup: Fourth round (eliminated by Ipswich Town)
- Top goalscorer: League: Ted Purdon (15); All: Ted Purdon (15)
- Highest home attendance: 30,973 vs Leicester City, 5 September 1953
- Lowest home attendance: 14,625 vs Nottingham Forest, 19 April 1954
- Average home league attendance: 22,353
Home colours

The 1953–54 Football League season was Birmingham City Football Club's 51st in the Football League and their 23rd in the Second Division. They finished in seventh position in the 22-team division. They entered the 1953–54 FA Cup at the third round proper and lost to Ipswich Town in the fourth.

Twenty-eight players made at least one appearance in nationally organised first-team competition, and there were eleven different goalscorers. Full-back Ken Green played in 41 of the 44 first-team matches over the season, and Ted Purdon was leading goalscorer with 15 goals, all scored in league competition.

== Football League Second Division ==
Note that not all teams completed their playing season on the same day. Birmingham were in sixth position after their last game of the season, on 24 April, but by the time the last game was played, five days later, they were seventh, having been overtaken by Rotherham United.

Date	League position	Opponents	Venue	Result	Score F–A	Scorers	Attendance
19 August 1953	1st	Hull City	H	W	2–0	Murphy, Govan	23,846
22 August 1953	1st	Swansea Town	H	W	6–0	Purdon 2, Murphy 3, Kinsey	26,817
24 August 1953	1st	Plymouth Argyle	A	D	2–2	Kinsey, Govan	21,019
29 August 1953	3rd	Rotherham United	A	L	0–1		12,670
2 September 1953	3rd	Plymouth Argyle	H	W	3–0	Purdon, Kinsey, Stewart	21,440
5 September 1953	6th	Leicester City	H	L	1–2	Stewart	30,973
9 September 1953	2nd	Luton Town	H	W	5–1	Murphy, Purdon 2	18,881
12 September 1953	8th	Stoke City	A	L	2–3	Purdon, Hall	22,958
16 September 1953	11th	Luton Town	A	L	0–2		12,231
19 September 1953	11th	Fulham	H	D	2–2	Purdon 2	21,138
26 September 1953	8th	West Ham United	A	W	2–1	Purdon, Kinsey	36,091
3 October 1953	10th	Leeds United	H	D	3–3	Kinsey, Murphy, Govan	26,434
10 October 1953	6th	Lincoln City	H	W	1–0	Stewart	21,948
17 October 1953	6th	Bristol Rovers	A	D	1–1	Purdon	33,634
24 October 1953	6th	Brentford	H	W	5–1	Purdon, Kinsey, Murphy, Govan, Bragg og	23,582
31 October 1953	6th	Derby County	A	W	4–2	Purdon, Stewart, Murphy, Astall	18,278
7 November 1953	5th	Blackburn Rovers	H	D	0–0		24,604
14 November 1953	5th	Doncaster Rovers	A	L	1–3	Kinsey	16,586
21 November 1953	5th	Bury	H	D	0–0		20,723
28 November 1953	4th	Oldham Athletic	A	W	3–2	Kinsey, Astall, Govan	18,264
5 December 1953	4th	Everton	H	W	5–1	Trigg, Murphy, Astall 2, Clinton og	23,557
12 December 1953	5th	Hull City	A	L	0–3		19,752
19 December 1953	4th	Swansea Town	A	W	3–1	Rowley 2, Purdon	12,493
25 December 1953	4th	Notts County	H	W	3–0	Rowley 2, Govan	30,489
26 December 1953	4th	Notts County	A	L	1–2	Astall	20,986
2 January 1954	6th	Rotherham United	H	L	2–3	Purdon 2	16,768
16 January 1954	4th	Leicester City	A	W	4–3	Murphy, Rowley, Govan 2	34,704
23 January 1954	2nd	Stoke City	H	W	1–0	Kinsey	26,206
6 February 1954	6th	Fulham	A	L	2–5	Trigg 2	20,540
13 February 1954	5th	West Ham United	H	W	2–0	Cochrane, Astall	22,716
20 February 1954	5th	Leeds United	A	D	1–1	Rowley	22,803
27 February 1954	4th	Lincoln City	A	W	1–0	Lane	13,924
6 March 1954	5th	Bristol Rovers	H	D	1–1	Boyd	25,331
13 March 1954	5th	Brentford	A	L	0–2		12,584
20 March 1954	5th	Derby County	H	W	3–0	Trigg 2, Stewart	18,219
27 March 1954	5th	Bury	A	D	1–1	Stewart	11,293
3 April 1954	5th	Oldham Athletic	H	W	2–1	Murphy, Boyd	15,848
10 April 1954	5th	Blackburn Rovers	A	L	0–3		31,995
16 April 1954	5th	Nottingham Forest	A	D	1–1	Kinsey	25,285
17 April 1954	5th	Doncaster Rovers	H	L	0–1		15,266
19 April 1954	5th	Nottingham Forest	H	D	2–2	Lane, Stewart	14,625
24 April 1954	6th	Everton	A	L	0–1		62,865

=== League table (part) ===
Final Second Division table (part)
Pos	Club	Pld	W	D	L	F	A	GA	Pts
5th	Rotherham United	42	21	7	14	80	67	1.19	49
6th	Luton Town	42	18	12	12	64	59	1.08	48
7th	Birmingham City	42	18	11	13	78	58	1.34	47
8th	Fulham	42	17	10	15	98	85	1.15	44
9th	Bristol Rovers	42	14	16	12	64	58	1.10	44
Key	Pos = League position; Pld = Matches played; W = Matches won; D = Matches drawn; L = Matches lost; F = Goals for; A = Goals against; GA = Goal average; Pts = Points								
Source									

== FA Cup ==
Round	Date	Opponents	Venue	Result	Score F–A	Scorers	Attendance
Third round	9 January 1954	Wolverhampton Wanderers	A	W	2–1	Rowley 16', Murphy 68'	36,784
Fourth round	30 January 1954	Ipswich Town	A	L	0–1		25,088

== Appearances and goals ==
Players marked † left the club during the playing season.
Key to positions: GK – Goalkeeper; FB – Full back; HB – Half back; FW – Forward

Players' appearances and goals by competition
Pos.	Nat.	Name	League		FA Cup		Total	
Pos.	Nat.	Name	Apps	Goals	Apps	Goals	Apps	Goals
GK	ENG	Gil Merrick	38	0	2	0	40	0
GK	ENG	Johnny Schofield	4	0	0	0	4	0
FB	ENG	George Allen	1	0	0	0	1	0
FB	ENG	Ken Green	39	0	2	0	41	0
FB	ENG	Jeff Hall	32	1	2	0	34	1
FB	SCO	Roy Martin	13	0	0	0	13	0
HB	ENG	Jack Badham	7	0	0	0	7	0
HB	ENG	Keith Bannister	8	0	0	0	8	0
HB	ENG	Len Boyd	35	2	2	0	37	2
HB	ENG	Johnny Newman	7	0	1	0	8	0
HB	ENG	Trevor Smith	24	0	1	0	25	0
HB	ENG	Roy Warhurst	37	0	1	0	38	0
HB	ENG	Johnny Watts	7	0	0	0	7	0
FW	ENG	Gordon Astall	24	6	2	0	26	6
FW	ENG	Arthur Atkins	1	0	0	0	1	0
FW	ENG	Jimmy Cochrane	1	1	0	0	1	1
FW	ENG	Geoff Cox	1	0	0	0	1	0
FW	SCO	Alex Govan	38	8	2	0	40	8
FW	ENG	Dennis Hill	1	0	0	0	1	0
FW	ENG	John James	2	0	0	0	2	0
FW	WAL	Noel Kinsey	37	10	2	0	39	10
FW	ENG	Jackie Lane	8	2	1	0	9	2
FW	ENG	Peter Murphy	32	13	2	1	34	14
FW	ZAF	Ted Purdon †	23	15	0	0	23	15
FW	ENG	Ken Rowley	8	6	2	1	10	7
FW	ENG	Barry Squires	1	0	0	0	1	0
FW	SCO	Jackie Stewart	22	7	0	0	29	7
FW	ENG	Cyril Trigg	11	5	0	0	11	5

== See also ==
- Birmingham City F.C. seasons
