= 1959–60 Birmingham City F.C. season =

Birmingham City F.C.
1959–60 season
- Chairman: Harry Morris Jr
- Manager: Pat Beasley until May 1960; Gil Merrick thereafter
- Ground: St Andrew's
- Football League First Division: 19th
- FA Cup: Third round (eliminated by Watford)
- Inter-Cities Fairs Cup: Runners-up (eliminated by Barcelona)
- Top goalscorer: League: Johnny Gordon (16); All: Johnny Gordon (19)
- Highest home attendance: 41,260 vs Wolverhampton Wanderers, 22 August 1959
- Lowest home attendance: 14,152 vs Union Saint-Gilloise, Fairs Cup semi-final, 11 November 1959
- Average home league attendance: 26,880
Home colours

The 1959–60 Football League season was Birmingham City Football Club's 57th in the Football League and their 33rd in the First Division. They finished in 19th position in the 22-team division. They lost their opening third-round 1959–60 FA Cup-tie to Watford. In the 1958–60 Inter-Cities Fairs Cup, Birmingham reached the final, in which they lost 4–1 on aggregate to Barcelona.

Twenty-two players made at least one appearance in senior first-team competition, and there were fifteen different goalscorers. Half backs Trevor Smith and Johnny Watts played in 46 of the 47 first-team matches over the season, and Johnny Gordon finished as leading goalscorer with 19 goals in all competitions, of which 16 were scored in the league.

Pat Beasley resigned as manager at the end of May 1960, to be replaced by club appearance record-holder Gil Merrick following his retirement as a player.

== Football League First Division ==
Date	League position	Opponents	Venue	Result	Score F–A	Scorers	Attendance
22 August 1959	19th	Wolverhampton Wanderers	H	L	0–1		41,248
26 August 1959	10th	Newcastle United	H	W	4–3	Stubbs, Gordon, Orritt, Hooper pen	26,986
29 August 1959	12th	Tottenham Hotspur	A	D	0–0		45,243
2 September 1959	16th	Newcastle United	A	L	0–1		35,395
5 September 1959	16th	Manchester United	H	D	1–1	Watts	38,242
9 September 1959	16th	Chelsea	H	D	1–1	Larkin	28,132
12 September 1959	19th	Preston North End	A	L	2–3	Stubbs, Neal	18,934
16 September 1959	21st	Chelsea	A	L	2–4	Hooper pen, Scott og	31,651
19 September 1959	22nd	Leicester City	H	L	3–4	Hooper 2 (1 pen), Smith	24,950
26 September 1959	22nd	Burnley	A	L	1–3	Orritt	23,848
3 October 1959	21st	Leeds United	H	W	2–0	Barrett, Taylor	25,301
10 October 1959	21st	Sheffield Wednesday	H	D	0–0		21,769
17 October 1959	18th	Nottingham Forest	A	W	2–0	Stubbs, Gordon	24,904
24 October 1959	19th	Fulham	H	L	2–4	Gordon 2	26,691
31 October 1959	21st	Arsenal	A	L	0–3		34,430
7 November 1959	21st	Luton Town	H	D	1–1	Barrett	19,007
14 November 1959	21st	Everton	A	L	0–4		19,172
21 November 1959	19th	Blackpool	H	W	2–1	Larkin, Hooper	24,783
28 November 1959	19th	Blackburn Rovers	A	L	1–2	Barrett	20,549
5 December 1959	19th	Manchester City	H	W	4–2	Gordon 2, Barrett, Hooper	18,661
12 December 1959	20th	Bolton Wanderers	A	L	1–4	Hooper	16,074
19 December 1959	21st	Wolverhampton Wanderers	A	L	0–2		22,363
26 December 1959	20th	West Ham United	H	W	2–0	Astall, Hooper	29,745
28 December 1959	21st	West Ham United	A	L	1–3	Astall	26,154
2 January 1960	21st	Tottenham Hotspur	H	L	0–1		27,558
16 January 1960	21st	Manchester United	A	L	1–2	Larkin	47,606
23 January 1960	21st	Preston North End	H	W	2–1	Larkin, Neal	24,160
6 February 1960	21st	Leicester City	A	W	3–1	Weston, Hume, Hooper	25,896
27 February 1960	21st	Manchester City	A	L	0–3		23,479
5 March 1960	20th	Nottingham Forest	H	W	4–1	Gordon 2, Neal, Hooper	24,821
9 March 1960	20th	Leeds United	A	D	3–3	Neal, Hooper, McConnell og	8,557
12 March 1960	20th	Fulham	A	D	2–2	Gordon, Hooper	25,208
19 March 1960	21st	Bolton Wanderers	H	L	2–5	Weston, Gordon	24,183
26 March 1960	21st	Luton Town	A	D	1–1	Weston	13,620
2 April 1960	20th	Everton	H	D	2–2	Gordon, Astall	24,872
9 April 1960	20th	Blackpool	A	W	1–0	Gordon	13,595
16 April 1960	20th	Arsenal	H	W	3–0	Murphy 2, Gordon	27,201
18 April 1960	20th	West Bromwich Albion	H	L	1–7	Gordon	28,685
19 April 1960	20th	West Bromwich Albion	A	D	1–1	Gordon	37,894
23 April 1960	20th	Sheffield Wednesday	A	W	4–2	Murphy 2, Astall, Hooper	25,310
27 April 1960	20th	Burnley	H	L	0–1		37,032
30 April 1960	19th	Blackburn Rovers	H	W	1–0	Gordon	24,476

=== League table (part) ===
Final First Division table (part)
Pos	Club	Pld	W	D	L	F	A	GA	Pts
17th	Blackburn Rovers	42	16	5	21	60	70	0.86	37
18th	Chelsea	42	14	9	19	76	91	0.83	37
19th	Birmingham City	42	13	10	19	63	80	0.79	36
20th	Nottingham Forest	42	13	9	20	50	74	0.68	35
21st	Leeds United	42	12	10	20	63	80	0.71	34
Key	Pos = League position; Pld = Matches played; W = Matches won; D = Matches drawn; L = Matches lost; F = Goals for; A = Goals against; GA = Goal average; Pts = Points								
Source									

== FA Cup ==
Round	Date	Opponents	Venue	Result	Score F–A	Scorers	Attendance
Third round	9 January 1960	Watford	A	L	1–2	Hooper	31,548

== Inter-Cities Fairs Cup ==
The early rounds of the 1958–60 Inter-Cities Fairs Cup were completed during Birmingham's 1958–59 season, leaving the semi-finals and final to be played this season. In the semi-final, Birmingham beat Belgian club Union Saint-Gilloise 4–2 in each leg to reach the final, in which they played Barcelona, who had eliminated them at the semi-final stage in the previous edition of the competition.

The first leg of the final was played in "bitter, slanting rain" on a St Andrew's pitch that "almost from one goal to the other down the centre, was a series of little lakes". Birmingham played a "fast, open game" more suited to the conditions, while Barcelona's technical superiority was blunted both by the mud and by the "hard-tackling, grafting, bustling Birmingham defence, in which Smith and Neal in particular stood out like rocks long before the end". In the second half, Barcelona tired; El Mundo Deportivo noted that they had played a league match in Seville only 48 hours earlier and the players were not machines. The home side had three good chances: Ramallets dived at Hooper's feet, Weston ran the ball out of play when under no pressure, and a "sliding tackle from nowhere by Gensana turned away what looked like a certain goal", again for Weston.

The Times' correspondent's fears that Birmingham had missed their opportunity – "here was a setting that favoured Birmingham's particular style, and they did not win" – were realised in the second leg. In a one-sided match in front of a crowd of 75,000, Barcelona were two goals up after six minutes, and doubled their tally before Murphy broke down the left and sent a long pass towards Hooper, whose mobility helped him beat Ramallets to the ball and score with a header.

Round	Date	Opponents	Venue	Result	Score F–A	Scorers	Attendance
Semi-final 1st leg	7 October 1959	Union Saint-Gilloise	A	W	4–2	Hooper, Gordon, Barrett, Orritt	20,000
Semi-final 2nd leg	11 November 1959	Union Saint-Gilloise	H	W	4–2	Gordon 2, Larkin, Hooper	14,152
Final 1st leg	29 March 1960	Barcelona	H	D	0–0		40,524
Final 2nd leg	4 May 1960	Barcelona	A	L	1–4	Hooper	75,000

== Appearances and goals ==
Key to positions: GK – Goalkeeper; FB – Full back; HB – Half back; FW – Forward

Players' appearances and goals by competition
Pos.	Nat.	Name	League		FA Cup		Fairs Cup		Total	
Pos.	Nat.	Name	Apps	Goals	Apps	Goals	Apps	Goals	Apps	Goals
GK	ENG	Gil Merrick	2	0	0	0	1	0	3	0
GK	ENG	Johnny Schofield	40	0	1	0	3	0	44	0
FB	ENG	George Allen	36	0	1	0	3	0	40	0
FB	ENG	Brian Farmer	40	0	1	0	4	0	45	0
FB	ENG	Graham Sissons	8	0	0	0	1	0	9	0
FB	ENG	Pat Wright	1	0	0	0	0	0	1	0
HB	ENG	Dick Neal	39	3	1	0	3	0	43	3
HB	ENG	Trevor Smith	41	1	1	0	4	0	46	1
HB	ENG	Johnny Watts	41	1	1	0	4	0	46	1
FW	ENG	Gordon Astall	19	4	1	0	2	0	22	4
FW	ENG	Jim Barrett	10	4	1	0	2	1	13	5
FW	ENG	Johnny Gordon	39	16	0	0	4	3	43	19
FW	ENG	Mike Hellawell	11	0	0	0	1	0	12	0
FW	ENG	Harry Hooper	39	13	1	1	4	3	44	17
FW	SCO	Billy Hume	8	2	0	0	0	0	8	2
FW	ENG	Bunny Larkin	19	4	1	0	1	1	21	5
FW	ENG	Peter Murphy	7	4	0	0	1	0	8	4
FW	WAL	Bryan Orritt	16	2	0	0	2	1	18	3
FW	ENG	Billy Rudd	4	0	0	0	0	0	4	0
FW	ENG	Robin Stubbs	18	3	1	0	0	0	19	3
FW	ENG	Brian Taylor	8	1	0	0	2	0	10	1
FW	ENG	Don Weston	16	3	0	0	2	0	18	3

== See also ==
- Birmingham City F.C. seasons
