= 1958–59 Birmingham City F.C. season =

Birmingham City F.C.
1958–59 season
- Chairman: Harry Morris Jr
- Manager: Arthur Turner / Pat Beasley; (joint appointment) until September 1958; Pat Beasley thereafter
- Ground: St Andrew's
- Football League First Division: 9th
- FA Cup: Fifth round (eliminated by Nottingham Forest)
- Inter-Cities Fairs Cup: Semi-final
- Top goalscorer: League: Bunny Larkin (18); All: Bunny Larkin (23)
- Highest home attendance: 55,300 vs Nottingham Forest, FA Cup 5th round, 14 February 1959
- Lowest home attendance: 17,241 vs Blackpool, 13 December 1958
- Average home league attendance: 26,893
Home colours

The 1958–59 Football League season was Birmingham City Football Club's 56th in the Football League and their 32nd in the First Division. After spending the first half of the season towards the bottom of the division, they finished in 9th position in the 22-team division. They entered the 1958–59 FA Cup at the third round proper and lost to Nottingham Forest in the fifth round after two replays. In the Inter-Cities Fairs Cup, Birmingham progressed through two rounds to reach the semi-final, which was not played until the 1959–60 season.

Towards the end of the season, Birmingham and England full-back Jeff Hall contracted polio and died, only 14 days after the last match in which he played. The death of a young, fit, international footballer helped to kick-start widespread public acceptance in Britain of the need for vaccination. Though the disease was generally feared and the Salk vaccine was available, takeup had been slow. In the weeks following Hall's death, and after his widow spoke on television about her loss, demand for immunisation rocketed. Emergency vaccination clinics had to be set up and supplies of vaccine flown in from the United States to cope with the demand.

In January 1958, Pat Beasley joined the club. Beasley had believed he was coming as assistant to manager Arthur Turner, but chairman Harry Morris announced to the press that he was to be appointed joint manager. Turner, who found about this arrangement not from the club but from the press, threatened to resign. He was persuaded to stay "for the time being", but finally left in September 1958, and Beasley took over as manager. Twenty-four players made at least one appearance in nationally organised first-team competition, and there were thirteen different goalscorers. Half backs Dick Neal and Johnny Watts played in 49 and 48 of the 52 first-team matches over the season, and Bunny Larkin finished as leading goalscorer with 23 goals in all competitions, of which 18 were scored in the league.

== Football League First Division ==
Date	League position	Opponents	Venue	Result	Score F–A	Scorers	Attendance
23 August 1958	10th	Aston Villa	A	D	1–1	Murphy	55,198
27 August 1958	11th	West Bromwich Albion	A	D	2–2	Brown, Houghton	46,468
30 August 1958	14th	Luton Town	H	L	0–1		31,943
3 September 1958	21st	West Bromwich Albion	H	L	0–6		35,983
6 September 1958	21st	Bolton Wanderers	A	L	0–2		24,707
10 September 1958	21st	Leeds United	H	D	0–0		25,228
13 September 1958	19th	Burnley	H	W	2–1	Brown, Murphy	23,926
17 September 1958	16th	Leeds United	A	W	4–1	Brown 4	24,068
20 September 1958	18th	Preston North End	A	L	0–3		24,257
27 September 1958	14th	Leicester City	H	W	4–2	Gordon, Murphy, Hooper, Astall	33,323
4 October 1958	18th	Everton	A	L	1–3	Murphy	39,408
11 October 1958	17th	West Ham United	A	W	2–1	Hooper, Neal	29,139
18 October 1958	17th	Nottingham Forest	H	L	0–3		31,610
25 October 1958	19th	Wolverhampton Wanderers	A	L	1–3	Astall	36,156
1 November 1958	20th	Portsmouth	H	W	2–2	Brown, Taylor	23,723
8 November 1958	19th	Blackburn Rovers	A	L	2–3	Brown, Larkin	28,806
15 November 1958	19th	Newcastle United	H	W	1–0	Larkin	28,752
22 November 1958	17th	Tottenham Hotspur	A	W	4–0	Larkin 2, Hooper, Taylor	28,708
29 November 1958	19th	Manchester United	H	L	0–4		28,658
6 December 1958	20th	Chelsea	A	L	0–1		27,773
13 December 1958	18th	Blackpool	H	W	4–2	Jackson, Gordon, Larkin, Astall	17,241
20 December 1958	15th	Aston Villa	H	W	4–1	Jackson 2, Astall, Neal	31,857
26 December 1958	15th	Manchester City	H	W	6–1	Jackson 2, Gordon, Larkin, Taylor	34,290
27 December 1958	16th	Manchester City	A	L	1–4	Jackson	29,276
3 January 1959	13th	Luton Town	A	W	1–0	Neal	15,538
31 January 1959	12th	Burnley	A	W	1–0	Gordon	22,101
7 February 1959	11th	Preston North End	H	W	5–1	Orritt, Gordon, Larkin, Taylor	21,233
21 February 1959	10th	Everton	H	W	2–1	Larkin, Hooper	22,660
28 February 1959	8th	West Ham United	H	W	3–0	Larkin, Neal	19,910
7 March 1959	8th	Nottingham Forest	A	W	7–1	Stubbs 2, Gordon, Astall 2, Hooper, Watts	18,977
14 March 1959	8th	Wolverhampton Wanderers	H	L	0–3		37,725
18 March 1959	6th	Leicester City	A	W	4–2	Stubbs 3, Gordon	15,413
21 March 1959	6th	Portsmouth	A	D	1–1	Larkin	18,170
8 April 1959	10th	Bolton Wanderers	H	L	1–3	Stubbs	24,608
11 April 1959	10th	Tottenham Hotspur	H	W	5–1	Stubbs, Gordon, Larkin, Hooper pen, Baker og	20,557
14 April 1959	9th	Arsenal	H	W	4–1	Stubbs, Larkin 2, Astall	25,792
18 April 1959	10th	Manchester United	A	L	0–1		43,006
20 April 1959	10th	Blackpool	A	L	0–2		12,260
22 April 1959	10th	Blackburn Rovers	H	W	3–0	Larkin 2, Taylor	22,958
25 April 1959	9th	Chelsea	H	W	4–1	Gordon 2, Hooper, Taylor	19,580
29 April 1959	9th	Newcastle United	A	D	1–1	Hooper	19,776
4 May 1959	9th	Arsenal	A	L	1–2	Stubbs	25,953

=== League table (part) ===
Final First Division table (part)
Pos	Club	Pld	W	D	L	F	A	GA	Pts
7th	Burnley	42	19	10	13	81	70	1.16	48
8th	Blackpool	42	18	11	13	66	49	1.35	47
9th	Birmingham City	42	20	6	16	84	68	1.24	46
10th	Blackburn Rovers	42	17	10	15	76	70	1.09	44
11th	Newcastle United	42	17	7	18	80	80	1.00	41
Key	Pos = League position; Pld = Matches played; W = Matches won; D = Matches drawn; L = Matches lost; F = Goals for; A = Goals against; GA = Goal average; Pts = Points								
Source									

== FA Cup ==
Round	Date	Opponents	Venue	Result	Score F–A	Scorers	Attendance
Third round	25 January 1959	Middlesbrough	A	W	1–0	Harris og	36,587
Fourth round	28 January 1959	Fulham	H	D	1–1	Jackson	42,677
Fourth round replay	4 February 1959	Fulham	A	W	3–2	Hooper 2, Larkin	27,521
Fifth round	14 February 1959	Nottingham Forest	H	D	1–1	Astall	55,300
Fifth round replay	18 February 1959	Nottingham Forest	A	D	1–1	Gordon	39,431
Fifth round 2nd replay	23 February 1959	Nottingham Forest	Filbert Street, Leicester	L	0–5		34,458

== Inter-Cities Fairs Cup ==
Round	Date	Opponents	Venue	Result	Score F–A	Scorers	Attendance
First round 1st leg	14 October 1958	Cologne XI	A	D	2–2	Neal, Hooper	12,000
First round 2nd leg	11 November 1958	Cologne	H	W	2–0	Larkin, Taylor	20,266
Second round 1st leg	6 May 1959	Zagreb XI	H	W	1–0	Larkin	21,411
Second round 2nd leg	24 May 1959	Zagreb XI	A	D	3–3	Larkin 2, Hooper	50,000

== Appearances and goals ==
Players marked † left the club during the playing season.
Key to positions: GK – Goalkeeper; FB – Full back; HB – Half back; FW – Forward

Players' appearances and goals by competition
Pos.	Nat.	Name	League		FA Cup		Fairs Cup		Total	
Pos.	Nat.	Name	Apps	Goals	Apps	Goals	Apps	Goals	Apps	Goals
GK	ENG	Gil Merrick	34	0	6	0	2	0	42	0
GK	ENG	Johnny Schofield	8	0	0	0	2	0	10	0
FB	ENG	George Allen	27	0	6	0	3	0	36	0
FB	ENG	Brian Farmer	13	0	0	0	2	0	15	0
FB	ENG	Ken Green	15	0	0	0	1	0	16	0
FB	ENG	Jeff Hall	29	0	6	0	2	0	37	0
HB	SCO	Billy Hume	2	0	0	0	0	0	2	0
HB	ENG	Dick Neal	39	4	6	0	4	1	49	5
HB	ENG	Graham Sissons	16	0	0	0	2	0	18	0
HB	ENG	Trevor Smith	27	0	6	0	2	0	35	0
HB	ENG	Johnny Watts	38	1	6	0	4	0	48	1
FW	ENG	Gordon Astall	26	8	5	1	1	0	32	9
FW	ENG	Eddy Brown †	17	8	0	0	2	0	19	8
FW	ENG	Johnny Gordon	33	10	6	1	4	0	43	11
FW	ENG	Mike Hellawell	1	0	0	0	0	0	1	0
FW	ENG	Harry Hooper	34	8	4	2	4	2	42	12
FW	ENG	Bud Houghton †	2	1	0	0	0	0	2	1
FW	SCO	Alex Jackson †	6	6	4	1	0	0	10	7
FW	ENG	David Jones	4	0	0	0	0	0	4	0
FW	ENG	Bunny Larkin	31	18	6	1	3	4	40	23
FW	ENG	Peter Murphy	10	4	0	0	1	0	11	4
FW	WAL	Bryan Orritt	12	1	3	0	1	0	16	1
FW	ENG	Robin Stubbs	12	9	0	0	2	0	14	9
FW	ENG	Brian Taylor	26	5	2	0	2	1	30	6

== See also ==
- Birmingham City F.C. seasons
