= 1966–67 Port Vale F.C. season =

Port Vale's 1966-67 season: Mid-table finish

Port Vale F.C.
1966–67 season
- Chairman: Fred Pinfold
- Manager: Jackie Mudie
- Stadium: Vale Park
- Football League Fourth Division: 13th (43 points)
- FA Cup: Second Round (eliminated by Barnsley)
- League Cup: First Round (eliminated by Walsall)
- Player of the Year: Roy Sproson
- Top goalscorer: League: Mick Cullerton (12); All: Mick Cullerton (12)
- Highest home attendance: 12,784 vs. Barnsley, 16 January 1967
- Lowest home attendance: 2,554 vs. York City, 24 April 1967
- Average home league attendance: 5,114
- Biggest win: 5–0 vs. Rochdale, 28 March 1967
- Biggest defeat: 1–4 vs. Southend United, 14 October 1966
Home colours

The 1966–67 season was Port Vale's 55th season of football in the English Football League, and their second-successive season (third overall) in the Fourth Division. Led by player‑manager Jackie Mudie and chaired by Fred Pinfold, the club delivered a mid‑table finish — ending 13th with 43 points—and failed once again to challenge for promotion.

After a summer marred by a serious car crash involving general manager Stanley Matthews during a proposed transfer signing, the squad was reshaped with young additions such as Ian Lawson, Mick Mahon, Jimmy Goodfellow and Billy McCartney — while the team notably adopted a new all‑white kit at Matthews's suggestion. Early-season momentum lifted Vale into the promotion conversation, but the sale of a key forward precipitated a dip in form that saw inconsistency plague their campaign. Despite a resurgent late run, including a 5–0 thrashing of Rochdale and the debut of precocious 15‑year‑old Stuart Chapman, the club remained mid-table.

Off the field, defender Roy Sproson was honoured as the club’s first-ever Player of the Year, while Mick Cullerton emerged as top goalscorer, netting 12 times in both league and all competitions. Attendance figures showed a high of 12,784 against Barnsley on 16 January 1967, a low of 2,554 versus York City on 24 April 1967, and an average league gate of 5,114. Cup runs offered only modest respite: Vale were knocked out in the Second Round of the FA Cup, losing to Barnsley, and exited the League Cup in the First Round, falling to Walsall. At season's end, Jackie Mudie resigned as player‑manager, bringing the curtain down on his stewardship.

Overall, the 1966–67 season was a continuation of stasis in the Fourth Division — characterised by modest league performance, limited cup success, squad stability under Mudie, and the first formal recognition of Roy Sproson's excellence.

== Overview ==
=== Fourth Division ===
The pre-season saw general manager Stanley Matthews injured in a car accident with a National Coal Board lorry on 29 July. Jackie Mudie was also in the car but remained relatively unharmed. As Matthews recovered, in came four new forwards, the most significant of which was Crystal Palace's 27-year-old Ian Lawson. Lawson cost £1,000 with an additional £1,000 signing on fee. Other new faces included winger Mick Mahon (Loughborough United); inside-forward Jimmy Goodfellow (Bishop Auckland); and Billy McCartney (Rangers). There was a kit change to an all-white strip, upon the suggestion of Stanley Matthews.

The season opened with a 2–1 home win over Southport using an optimistic 4–2–4 formation. Following Roy Sproson's winning goal there was a pitch invasion – by then a disturbingly common occurrence. Six games without a loss followed, leaving the club in fourth position. Goals were still rare, however, and so Lawson was dropped from the first XI, despite the departure of in-form forward John Rowland to Mansfield Town for £6,500. Financial difficulties made the atmosphere around Burslem quite gloomy, not helped by the news that former Valiant John Nicholson had been killed in a car crash. Vale's form suffered, though the defence remained quite strong after Clint Boulton was shifted to right-half. Young Scot Mick Cullerton was a ray of sunshine for the club in front of goal. A 4–1 defeat at Southend United on 14 October, with the hosts four goals ahead after 36 minutes, was part of a sequence of seven games without a victory. Only 3,502 came to Vale Park on 5 November to witness a 1–0 victory over Luton Town.

Good form in the Christmas period continued into an unbeaten January in the league, as the club climbed to within five points of the promotion places with a 3–1 win at Chester on 28 January. In came Wales international centre-forward Mel Charles from Porthmadog. for a £1,250 fee. A 1–0 defeat at Gresty Road to Crewe Alexandra in front of an unruly crowd marked the first of a crucial seven-game sequence against the promotion hopefuls. The match was marred by fan disorder and several fans ended up hospitalised. A win over Barrow and a draw at Stockport County was succeeded by five straight defeats, killing Vale's promotion hopes dead. They reversed the decline by doing the double over Rochdale within two days, including a 5–0 victory witnessed by 3,004 fans at Vale Park in "one of the most thrilling exhibitions of attacking football the ground had ever seen". In April, popular player John Ritchie was sold to Preston North End for £17,500. Mel Charles was sidelined with a knee injury and Vale limped to the season's end without a win in their final five games. On 3 May, Stuart Chapman made his debut at the age of 15 in a 2–2 draw with Lincoln City. Five days later, manager Jackie Mudie tendered his resignation as player-manager, citing 'personal reasons'.

They finished in 13th place with 43 points, marking a slight improvement on the previous campaign. Mick Cullerton's twelve goals in all competitions were enough to make him the top-scorer. In the club's first ever Player of the Year ceremony, veteran defender Roy Sproson was bestowed with the honour. Meanwhile, the club's youth team performed brilliantly, reaching the quarter-finals of the FA Youth Cup, where they were eliminated 3–0 by Scunthorpe United.

=== Finances ===
On the financial side, there was a loss of £7,925 despite a transfer credit of £20,425 and a donation of £19,381 from the Sportsmen's Association and the Development Pool. Gate receipts were just £30,298, whilst the club's overdraft stood at £82,373. Nine players were released at the end of the season, most notably: Mel Charles (Oswestry Town); Ian Lawson and Brian Taylor (Barnsley); and untested reserve Ray Kennedy – who would take a break from football before returning to the game to play for Liverpool and England. Roddy Georgeson was also released at his own request to work in a bank, though he soon turned out for Dundee before beginning a long career in Scottish football.

=== Cup competitions ===
In the FA Cup, a 4–3–3 formation was used to defeat Bradford City 2–1 at Valley Parade with a 40 yards (37 m) 'goal of a lifetime' from John Ritchie. Vale drew Barnsley in the second round, and earned a replay with a "sparkling" 1–1 draw at Oakwell. The replay attracted 12,784 supporters, but "Tykes" ran out 3–1 winners.

In the League Cup, Third Division side Walsall knocked out the Vale at the first stage with a 3–1 win.

== Results ==
=== Football League Fourth Division ===
==== League table ====
Pos	Team	Pld	W	D	L	GF	GA	GAv	Pts
11	Bradford City	46	19	10	17	74	62	1.194	48
12	Halifax Town	46	15	14	17	59	68	0.868	44
13	Port Vale	46	14	15	17	55	58	0.948	43
14	Exeter City	46	14	15	17	50	60	0.833	43
15	Chesterfield	46	17	8	21	60	63	0.952	42

Source: rsssf.com

==== Results by matchday ====
Round	1	2	3	4	5	6	7	8	9	10	11	12	13	14	15	16	17	18	19	20	21	22	23	24	25	26	27	28	29	30	31	32	33	34	35	36	37	38	39	40	41	42	43	44	45	46
Ground	H	A	H	H	A	A	H	A	A	H	A	H	H	A	H	A	H	H	A	A	A	H	H	H	A	A	H	A	A	H	H	A	H	A	H	A	H	A	A	H	H	A	H	H	A	A
Result	D	D	D	W	D	W	D	L	D	D	L	L	L	W	W	L	W	L	L	D	W	D	D	W	W	L	W	D	L	L	L	L	L	W	W	D	W	L	D	L	W	D	D	D	L	L
Position	4	4	7	4	6	5	4	9	9	10	9	13	15	14	13	13	14	14	17	16	15	15	15	13	12	12	11	11	12	13	14	17	17	15	14	13	13	13	12	13	12	12	12	12	12	13
Points	1	2	3	5	6	8	9	9	10	11	11	11	11	13	15	15	17	17	17	18	20	21	22	24	26	26	28	29	29	29	29	29	29	31	33	35	37	37	38	38	40	41	42	43	43	43

Source: Statto
A = Away; H = Home; W = Win; D = Draw; L = Loss

==== Matches ====
20 August 1966 1	Port Vale	2–1	Southport	Burslem
	Rowland; Sproson	Report		Stadium: Vale Park; Attendance: 8,143

27 August 1966 2	Notts County	0–0	Port Vale	Nottingham
		Report		Stadium: Meadow Lane; Attendance: 5,648

3 September 1966 3	Port Vale	1–1	Chester	Burslem
	Georgeson	Report		Stadium: Vale Park; Attendance: 6,853

5 September 1966 4	Port Vale	3–2	Bradford City	Burslem
	Mahon; Rowland; Hill	Report		Stadium: Vale Park; Attendance: 6,258

10 September 1966 5	Bradford (Park Avenue)	1–1	Port Vale	Bradford
		Report	Rowland	Stadium: Park Avenue; Attendance: 5,246

17 September 1966 6	Exeter City	0–1	Port Vale	Exeter
		Report	Miles	Stadium: St James Park; Attendance: 4,789

24 September 1966 7	Port Vale	1–1	Crewe Alexandra	Burslem
	Hill	Report		Stadium: Vale Park; Attendance: 11,325

28 September 1966 8	Bradford City	2–0	Port Vale	Bradford
		Report		Stadium: Valley Parade; Attendance: 3,928

1 October 1966 9	Barrow	2–2	Port Vale	Barrow-in-Furness
		Report	Goodfellow; Hill	Stadium: Holker Street; Attendance: 3,354

8 October 1966 10	Port Vale	1–1	Tranmere Rovers	Burslem
	Sproson	Report		Stadium: Vale Park; Attendance: 6,684

14 October 1966 11	Southend United	4–1	Port Vale	Southend-on-Sea
		Report	Ritchie	Stadium: Roots Hall; Attendance: 12,609

17 October 1966 12	Port Vale	2–3	Chesterfield	Burslem
15:15 BST	Georgeson; Mahon	Report		Stadium: Vale Park; Attendance: 5,649

22 October 1966 13	Port Vale	0–2	Wrexham	Burslem
		Report	Kinsey 8'; Lloyd 80'	Stadium: Vale Park; Attendance: 7,753; Referee: J.H. Yates; Assistant referees: A.H. Swadkins, T.E. Lockett

29 October 1966 14	Aldershot	0–1	Port Vale	Aldershot
		Report	McCartney	Stadium: Recreation Ground; Attendance: 5,047

5 November 1966 15	Port Vale	1–0	Luton Town	Burslem
	Mahon	Report		Stadium: Vale Park; Attendance: 3,502

12 November 1966 16	Barnsley	1–0	Port Vale	Barnsley
		Report		Stadium: Oakwell; Attendance: 4,823

19 November 1966 17	Port Vale	2–0	Newport County	Burslem
	Miles; Hill	Report		Stadium: Vale Park; Attendance: 3,883

3 December 1966 18	Port Vale	0–1	Halifax Town	Burslem
		Report		Stadium: Vale Park; Attendance: 4,002

10 December 1966 19	Hartlepools United	2–1	Port Vale	Hartlepool
	Wright 1'; Phythian 30'	Report	Hill 65'	Stadium: Victoria Park; Attendance: 5,342; Referee: Dr DW Brady

17 December 1966 20	Southport	0–0	Port Vale	Southport
		Report		Stadium: Haig Avenue; Attendance: 3,975

27 December 1966 21	Lincoln City	0–1	Port Vale	Lincoln
		Report	Cullerton	Stadium: Sincil Bank; Attendance: 5,268

31 December 1966 22	Port Vale	0–0	Notts County	Burslem
		Report		Stadium: Vale Park; Attendance: 5,359

14 January 1967 23	Port Vale	0–0	Bradford (Park Avenue)	Burslem
		Report		Stadium: Vale Park; Attendance: 4,798

21 January 1967 24	Port Vale	2–0	Exeter City	Burslem
	Cullerton (pen.); Mahon	Report		Stadium: Vale Park; Attendance: 3,450

28 January 1967 25	Chester	1–3	Port Vale	Chester
		Report	Mahon; Cullerton	Stadium: Sealand Road; Attendance: 5,586

3 February 1967 26	Crewe Alexandra	1–0	Port Vale	Crewe
		Report		Stadium: Gresty Road; Attendance: 10,414

11 February 1967 27	Port Vale	2–1	Barrow	Burslem
	Boulton; Mahon	Report		Stadium: Vale Park; Attendance: 6,267

17 February 1967 28	Stockport County	1–1	Port Vale	Stockport
19:30 GMT	Shawcross	Report	Miles	Stadium: Edgeley Park; Attendance: 9,756; Referee: David Laing

24 February 1967 29	Tranmere Rovers	2–1	Port Vale	Prenton
		Report	Cullerton	Stadium: Prenton Park; Attendance: 8,047

4 March 1967 30	Port Vale	1–3	Southend United	Burslem
	Goodfellow	Report		Stadium: Vale Park; Attendance: 4,695

11 March 1967 31	Port Vale	0–2	Stockport County	Burslem
		Report	Allchurch 66'; Harley 77'	Stadium: Vale Park; Attendance: 6,363; Referee: Dennis Brady

18 March 1967 32	Wrexham	2–1	Port Vale	Wrexham
15:15 GMT	McMillan 47'; Oldfield 90'	Report	Georgeson	Stadium: Racecourse Ground; Attendance: 7,176; Referee: J. Mitchell; Assistant referees: C.M. Smith, S. Read

25 March 1967 33	Port Vale	1–3	Brentford	Burslem
	Ritchie	Report	Richardson; Lawther; Curley	Stadium: Vale Park; Attendance: 3,434

27 March 1967 34	Rochdale	1–2	Port Vale	Rochdale
	Taylor	Report	Richardson (og.); Goodfellow	Stadium: Spotland Stadium; Attendance: 2,254

28 March 1967 35	Port Vale	5–0	Rochdale	Burslem
	Georgeson; Poole; Cullerton; Goodfellow; Wilson	Report		Stadium: Vale Park; Attendance: 3,004

1 April 1967 36	Luton Town	1–1	Port Vale	Luton
		Report	Wilson	Stadium: Kenilworth Road; Attendance: 5,410

8 April 1967 37	Port Vale	3–1	Barnsley	Burslem
	Cullerton; Hill	Report		Stadium: Vale Park; Attendance: 3,209

10 April 1967 38	York City	3–1	Port Vale	York
		Report	Goodfellow	Stadium: Bootham Crescent; Attendance: 3,834

17 April 1967 39	Newport County	1–1	Port Vale	Newport, Wales
	Smith	Report	Cullerton	Stadium: Somerton Park; Attendance: 1,914

22 April 1967 40	Port Vale	0–2	Aldershot	Burslem
		Report		Stadium: Vale Park; Attendance: 3,265

24 April 1967 41	Port Vale	4–1	York City	Burslem
	Cullerton; Georgeson; Goodfellow	Report		Stadium: Vale Park; Attendance: 2,554

29 April 1967 42	Halifax Town	2–2	Port Vale	Halifax, West Yorkshire
		Report	Taylor; Goodfellow	Stadium: The Shay; Attendance: 3,562

3 May 1967 43	Port Vale	2–2	Lincoln City	Burslem
	Cullerton	Report		Stadium: Vale Park; Attendance: 3,085

6 May 1967 44	Port Vale	0–0	Hartlepools United	Burslem
		Report		Stadium: Vale Park; Attendance: 3,178; Referee: WM Holian

8 May 1967 45	Chesterfield	2–1	Port Vale	Chesterfield, Derbyshire
		Report	Boulton	Stadium: Saltergate; Attendance: 2,605

13 May 1967 46	Brentford	2–0	Port Vale	Brentford, West London
	James (og.); Wilson	Report		Stadium: Griffin Park; Attendance: 3,592

=== FA Cup ===
26 November 1966 R1	Bradford City	1–2	Port Vale	Bradford
		Report	Ritchie; Lawson	Stadium: Valley Parade; Attendance: 5,712

7 January 1967 R2	Barnsley	1–1	Port Vale	Barnsley
		Report	Hill	Stadium: Oakwell; Attendance: 13,343

16 January 1967 Replay	Port Vale	1–3	Barnsley	Burslem
	Boulton	Report		Stadium: Vale Park; Attendance: 12,784

=== League Cup ===
23 August 1966 R1	Port Vale	1–3	Walsall	Burslem
	Rowland	Report		Stadium: Vale Park; Attendance: 9,181

== Squad statistics ==
=== Appearances and goals ===
Key to positions: GK – Goalkeeper; DF – Defender; MF – Midfielder; FW – Forward

No.	Pos	Nat	Player	Total		Fourth Division		FA Cup		League Cup	
No.	Pos	Nat	Player	Apps	Goals	Apps	Goals	Apps	Goals	Apps	Goals
	GK	(Scotland) SCO	Billy McNulty	1	0	1	0	0	0	0	0
	GK	(England) ENG	Stuart Sharratt	49	0	45	0	3	0	1	0
	DF	(England) ENG	Terry Alcock	45	0	41	0	3	0	1	0
	DF	(England) ENG	Clint Boulton	39	3	35	2	3	1	1	0
	DF	(Scotland) SCO	Gordon Logan	7	0	7	0	0	0	0	0
	DF	(England) ENG	Roy Sproson	34	2	31	2	2	0	1	0
	DF	(Scotland) SCO	Ron Wilson	36	2	33	2	3	0	0	0
	MF	(England) ENG	Stuart Chapman	1	0	1	0	0	0	0	0
	MF	(Wales) WAL	Mel Charles	7	0	7	0	0	0	0	0
	MF	(Scotland) SCO	Alex Donald	24	0	23	0	1	0	0	0
	MF	(England) ENG	Malcolm Gibbon	1	0	1	0	0	0	0	0
	MF	(England) ENG	Jimmy Goodfellow	28	7	26	7	1	0	1	0
	MF	(Northern Ireland) NIR	Jimmy Hill	39	7	36	6	3	1	0	0
	MF	(England) ENG	Mick Mahon	28	7	26	7	1	0	1	0
	MF	(England) ENG	Terry Miles	45	3	42	3	3	0	0	0
	FW	(Scotland) SCO	Mick Cullerton	31	12	28	12	3	0	0	0
	FW	(Egypt) EGY	Roddy Georgeson	22	5	22	5	0	0	0	0
	FW	(England) ENG	John James	8	0	7	0	0	0	1	0
	FW	(England) ENG	Ian Lawson	10	1	8	0	1	1	1	0
	FW	(England) ENG	Mel Lintern	1	0	1	0	0	0	0	0
	FW	(Scotland) SCO	Billy McCartney	16	1	15	1	1	0	0	0
	FW	(Scotland) SCO	Jackie Mudie	7	0	5	0	2	0	0	0
	FW	(England) ENG	Harry Poole	34	1	32	1	1	0	1	0
	FW	(England) ENG	Brian Taylor	11	1	10	1	1	0	0	0
Players who featured but departed the club during the season:
	DF	(England) ENG	John Ritchie	32	3	28	2	3	1	1	0
	FW	(England) ENG	Alan Johnson	0	0	0	0	0	0	0	0
	FW	(England) ENG	John Rowland	8	4	7	3	0	0	1	1

=== Top scorers ===
Place	Position	Nation	Name	Fourth Division	FA Cup	League Cup	Total
1	FW	Scotland	Mick Cullerton	12	0	0	12
2	MF	England	Mick Mahon	7	0	0	7
–	MF	England	Jimmy Goodfellow	7	0	0	7
–	MF	Northern Ireland	Jimmy Hill	6	1	0	7
5	FW	Egypt	Roddy Georgeson	5	0	0	5
6	FW	England	John Rowland	3	0	1	4
7	MF	England	Terry Miles	3	0	0	3
–	DF	England	John Ritchie	2	1	0	3
–	DF	England	Clint Boulton	2	1	0	3
10	DF	Scotland	Ron Wilson	2	0	0	2
–	DF	England	Roy Sproson	2	0	0	2
12	FW	Scotland	Billy McCartney	1	0	0	1
–	FW	England	Harry Poole	1	0	0	1
–	FW	England	Brian Taylor	1	0	0	1
–	FW	England	Ian Lawson	0	1	0	1
–	–	–	Own goals	1	0	0	1
			TOTALS	55	4	1	60

== Transfers ==
=== Transfers in ===
Date from	Position	Nationality	Name	From	Fee	Ref.
1966	MF	ENG	Jimmy Goodfellow	Bishop Auckland	Free transfer	
June 1966	FW	SCO	Billy McCartney	Rangers	Free transfer	
August 1966	FW	ENG	Ian Lawson	Crystal Palace	£1,000	
December 1966	MF	WAL	Mel Charles	(Wales) Porthmadog.	£1,250	

=== Transfers out ===
Date from	Position	Nationality	Name	To	Fee	Ref.
September 1966	FW	ENG	John Rowland	Mansfield Town	£6,500	
November 1966	MF	ENG	Alan Johnson	Stafford Rangers	Free transfer	
April 1967	DF	ENG	John Ritchie	Preston North End	£17,500	
May 1967	MF	WAL	Mel Charles	(Wales) Oswestry Town	Free transfer	
May 1967	FW	ENG	Ian Lawson	Barnsley	Free transfer	
May 1967	FW	SCO	Billy McCartney	(Wales) Oswestry Town	Free transfer	
May 1967	FW	SCO	Jackie Mudie	(Wales) Oswestry Town	Retired	
May 1967	GK	IRL	Jimmy O'Neill	(Republic of Ireland) Cork Celtic	Free transfer	
May 1967	MF	ENG	Brian Taylor	Barnsley	Free transfer	
July 1967	MF	EGY	Roddy Georgeson	(Scotland) Dundee	Released	
August 1967	DF	ENG	Terry Alcock	Blackpool	£30,000	

=== Loans out ===
Date from	Position	Nationality	Name	To	Date to	Ref.
December 1966	GK	IRL	Jimmy O'Neill	(Republic of Ireland) Cork Celtic	May 1967	
