= John Lane =

John Lane may refer to:

== American politicians ==
- John W. Lane (1835–1888), Texas politician
- John C. Lane (1872–1958), mayor of Honolulu

== Canadian politicians ==
- Gary Lane (politician) (John Gary Lane, born 1942), judge and politician in Saskatchewan, Canada
- John Gordon Lane (1916–2001), member of the Legislative Assembly of Ontario
- John Lane (Ontario politician) (1818–1890), Irish-born member of the Legislative Assembly of Ontario

== English politicians ==
- John Lane of Bentley (1609–1667), officer in the Royalist army and a member of parliament for Lichfield, 1661–1667

== Others ==
- John Lane (clothier) (died 1528), of Cullompton, Devon
- John Lane (metallurgist) (1678–1741), English metallurgist
- John Lane (poet) (fl. 1600–1630), English poet
- John Bryant Lane (1788–1868), English painter
- John Quincy Lane (1831–1903), American army officer and general after the American Civil War
- John Lane (publisher) (1854–1925), British publisher
- Paddy Lane (cricketer) (1886–1937), Australian cricketer, born John Lane
- Jackie Lane (footballer) (John George Lane, 1931–2023), English footballer
- Jack Lane (John William Lane, 1898–1984), English footballer
- J. Michael Lane (1936–2020), American epidemiologist
- John A. Lane (born 1955), American writer and historian of printing
- John Francis Lane (1928–2018), English journalist, critic and actor

== See also ==
- John Lane Bell (born 1945), British professor of philosophy in Canada
- Jackie Lane (disambiguation)
