= Geoffrey Lloyd =

Geoffrey Lloyd may refer to:

- Geoffrey Lloyd, Baron Geoffrey-Lloyd (1902–1984), British Conservative politician and life peer
- Geoffrey D. Lloyd (died 1986), Welsh journalist
- G. E. R. Lloyd (born 1933), historian of science at the University of Cambridge
- Geoff Lloyd (born 1973), British radio presenter
- Geoff Lloyd (footballer) (born 1942), Welsh footballer
- Geoff Lloyd, former bassist of the now defunct Canadian rock group Matthew Good Band
- Sammy Lloyd (Geoffrey Lloyd), rugby league footballer of the 1960s and 1970s

== See also ==
- Jeff Lloyd (1914–1997), speedway rider
