= Brian Taylor (footballer, born 1937) =

English footballer (1937–2015)

Personal information
- Full name: Brian Joseph Taylor
- Date of birth: 24 March 1937
- Place of birth: Walsall, England
- Date of death: 10 June 2015 (aged 78)
- Place of death: Menorca, Spain
- Position: Winger

Youth career
- 1952–1954: Walsall

Senior career*
Years	Team	Apps	(Gls)
1954–1958	Walsall	77	(17)
1958–1961	Birmingham City	54	(7)
1961–1963	Rotherham United	42	(5)
1963–1965	Shrewsbury Town	73	(8)
1965–1967	Port Vale	46	(2)
1967–1968	Barnsley	24	(2)
1968–1970	Kidderminster Harriers		
1970–197?	Bromsgrove Rovers		
- Welshpool Town
- Oswestry Town
- Darlaston
Total		316+	(41+)
- * Club domestic league appearances and goals

Brian Joseph Taylor (24 March 1937 – 10 June 2015) was an English footballer who played as a winger. In a career over 16 years, he made 316 league appearances in the Football League.

He turned professional with Walsall in September 1954 before winning a £10,000 move to Birmingham City in June 1958. He played in the top flight, as well as in Europe, for the "Blues" before he was struck down with a broken leg. He moved down a division to join Rotherham United in October 1961 before dropping down another division to play for Shrewsbury Town two years later. His descent to the basement division was complete when he was signed by Port Vale for £3,000 in July 1965. He transferred to Barnsley in May 1967 and helped the club to win promotion out of the Fourth Division in 1967–68. He later played non-League football with Kidderminster Harriers, Bromsgrove Rovers, Welshpool Town, Oswestry Town and Darlaston.

== Career ==
Taylor started his career as an amateur with Walsall and turned professional in September 1954. He made more than 70 appearances for the "Saddlers" in the Third Division South. (Note: The Neil Brown and Barry Hugman sources show 77 league games and 17 goals for Walsall, while Walsall F.C.'s official website shows 75 games and 19 goals.) Frank Buckley failed to keep Walsall out of the re-election zone in the 1954–55 season, and the Fellows Park club continued to struggle in the lower half of the table in 1955–56 and 1956–57 under the stewardship of John Love. Despite the introduction of a new boss Bill Moore, a 20th-place finish in 1957–58 left the club to become founder members of the Fourth Division.

He moved to First Division club Birmingham City in June 1958 in exchange for £10,000 and the inside-forward Jimmy Cochrane. Manager Arthur Turner described him as a "wonderful prospect". He scored six goals from 30 appearances in the 1958–59 season. Each of the six was the last goal of its match: his first top-flight goal, "tearing through straight from the second-half kick-off", helped earn his club a draw at Portsmouth, the other five all came in comfortable wins. Having come into the first-team early in the 1959–60 season when Gordon Astall was injured in the home defeat of Newcastle United, Taylor suffered double vision in the reverse fixture a week later and was out for a month. He was selected regularly during October by manager Pat Beasley until a broken leg, sustained in the Inter-Cities Fairs Cup semi-final win over Union Saint-Gilloise in mid-November, kept him out for a year. Though he returned to the first team, the injury had robbed him of much of his pace. He scored on his return against Manchester United, and made 24 appearances during the remainder of the season, sharing the outside-left position with Billy Rudd: Taylor was preferred on a heavy pitch.

After the removal of the maximum wage in 1961, Taylor was unable to agree terms for the coming season, so Birmingham circulated other clubs inviting offers for him. By mid-September, it became clear that the remaining few contract "rebels", Taylor included, would get no help from the League in settling their disputes with their clubs, and the Professional Footballers' Association advised them to submit transfer requests. Taylor played four first-team matches during September, then signed for Rotherham United on 13 October for a £10,000 fee.

Rotherham were competing in the Second Division under the stewardship of Tom Johnston. Taylor quickly became an established member of the team at Millmoor with his "good crossing ability", making a total of 26 appearances in the 1961–62 season. In the following season he was in and out of the team under new boss Danny Williams. Still, he managed another 20 appearances for the "Millers".

He moved to Shrewsbury Town for the 1963–64 season. Arthur Rowley's "Shrews" posted 11th and 16th-place finishes in the Third Division in 1963–64 and 1964–65. Taylor played 73 league games in his two seasons at the Gay Meadow.

Taylor was sold to Jackie Mudie's Port Vale for £3,000 in July 1965. He scored three goals in 42 appearances in the 1965–66 campaign, but made just 11 appearances at Vale Park in the 1966–67 season. He was given a free transfer to Fourth Division rivals Barnsley in May 1967.

Taylor played 24 games and helped Johnny Steele's "Tykes" to win promotion with a second-place finish in 1967–68, five points behind champions Luton Town. Despite this success, he left Oakwell and entered non-League football with Kidderminster Harriers (West Midlands (Regional) League), Bromsgrove Rovers, Welshpool Town, Oswestry Town and Darlaston.

== Later life ==
Taylor died suddenly on holiday in Menorca on 10 June 2015. His wife Joan had predeceased him, and one son survived him. His funeral took place at Shrewsbury Crematorium on 3 July 2015.

== Career statistics ==
Appearances and goals by club, season and competition
Club	Season	League			FA Cup		Other		Total	
Club	Season	Division	Apps	Goals	Apps	Goals	Apps	Goals	Apps	Goals
Walsall	1954–55	Third Division South	1	0	0	0	—		1	0
Walsall	1955–56	Third Division South	1	0	0	0	—		1	0
Walsall	1956–57	Third Division South	30	8	1	0	—		31	8
Walsall	1957–58	Third Division South	45	9	1	0	—		46	9
Walsall	Total		77	17	2	0	0	0	79	17
Birmingham City	1958–59	First Division	26	5	2	0	2	1	30	6
Birmingham City	1959–60	First Division	8	1	0	0	2	0	10	1
Birmingham City	1960–61	First Division	17	1	3	0	4	0	24	1
Birmingham City	1961–62	First Division	3	0	0	0	1	0	4	0
Birmingham City	Total		54	7	5	0	9	1	68	8
Rotherham United	1961–62	Second Division	25	4	0	0	1	0	26	4
Rotherham United	1962–63	Second Division	17	1	0	0	3	2	20	3
Rotherham United	Total		42	5	0	0	4	2	46	7
Shrewsbury Town	1963–64	Third Division	34	4	0	0	2	0	36	4
Shrewsbury Town	1964–65	Third Division	39	4	6	0	2	0	47	4
Shrewsbury Town	Total		73	8	6	0	4	0	83	8
Port Vale	1965–66	Fourth Division	36	1	4	1	2	1	42	3
Port Vale	1966–67	Fourth Division	10	1	1	0	0	0	11	1
Port Vale	Total		46	2	5	1	2	1	53	4
Barnsley	1967–68	Fourth Division	24	2	1	0	1	1	26	3
Career total			316	41	19	1	20	5	355	47

== Honours ==
Barnsley

- Football League Fourth Division second-place promotion: 1967–68
