= Peter McConnell (disambiguation) =

Peter McConnell (born 1960), is an American video game composer and musician

Peter McConnell may also refer to:

- Peter McConnell (footballer) (1937–2019), English professional footballer
- Peter McConnell (umpire) (1944–2025), Australian Test cricket match umpire
