= Jackie Lane =

Jackie Lane may refer to:

- Jackie Lane (actress) (1941–2021), British actress
- Jackie Lane (footballer) (1931–2023), English footballer
- Jocelyn Lane (born 1937), model, actress and designer also known as Jackie Lane

== See also ==
- John Lane (disambiguation)
