= Lintern =

Lintern is a surname. Notable people with the surname include:

- Mel Lintern (born 1950), English footballer
- Richard Lintern (born 1962), English actor
