= Ian Lawson (footballer, born 1939) =

English footballer (1939–2024)

Personal information
- Full name: Frederick Ian Allison Lawson
- Date of birth: 24 March 1939
- Place of birth: Ouston, County Durham, England
- Date of death: 9 February 2024 (aged 84)
- Height: 5 ft 11 in (1.80 m)
- Position: Forward

Youth career
- ?–1956: Burnley

Senior career*
Years	Team	Apps	(Gls)
1956–1962	Burnley	23	(7)
1962–1965	Leeds United	44	(17)
1965–1966	Crystal Palace	17	(6)
1966–1967	Port Vale	8	(0)
1967–1968	Barnsley	0	(0)
Total		92	(30)
- * Club domestic league appearances and goals

Frederick Ian Allison Lawson (24 March 1939 – February 2024) was an English professional footballer who played as a forward for Burnley, Leeds United, Crystal Palace and Port Vale in the 1950s and 1960s. He scored 34 goals in 99 league games in a 12-year career in the English Football League. He won the First Division title with Burnley in 1959–60, and won the Second Division title with Leeds United in 1963–64.

== Career ==
=== Burnley ===
Lawson started his career as an amateur at Burnley after being scouted in a local School's cup final, along with James Robson. He scored four goals on his debut in a 7–0 FA Cup victory over Chesterfield. He followed this up with a hat-trick against New Brighton in the following round. Despite some good times, including a purple patch in the "Clarets" 1956–57 FA Cup run, Lawson found it hard to break into the highly successful first-team. During this period Burnley were competing at the top of the First Division and were crowned champions of the English Football League in 1959–60 under the stewardship of Harry Potts. After spending six seasons at Turf Moor, during which he made only 23 appearances, the 23-year-old was sold to Leeds United for £20,000 in March 1962.

=== Leeds United ===
Lawson joined Leeds as they battled to avoid relegation to the Third Division and went straight into Don Revie's first team, where he scored once in eleven games. He made a bigger impact during the 1963–64 Second Division promotion season when he scored eleven goals in 24 matches. Still, his place in the first team was taken by Alan Peacock, who joined Leeds in February 1964, and Lawson made only three further appearances at Elland Road before joining Crystal Palace in June 1966 for a fee of £9,000.

=== Later career ===
Dick Graham's Palace team finished 11th in the Second Division in 1965–66, and Lawson scored six goals in 17 league games at Selhurst Park. He was signed by Port Vale manager Jackie Mudie in August 1966 for a £1,000 fee. He went straight into the first-team, making his debut at Vale Park in a 2–1 win over Southport on 20 August. However, he lost his place the following month and was limited to one goal in ten league and cup games in the 1966–67 season. He was given a free transfer to Fourth Division rivals Barnsley in May 1967. He never made a first-team appearance for Johnny Steele's "Tykes" before announcing his retirement from professional football after leaving Oakwell.

== Personal life and death ==
Lawson married Maureen and had a daughter, Sharon, and a son, Michael. Ian Lawson died in February 2024 at the age of 84.

== Career statistics ==
Appearances and goals by club, season and competition
Club	Season	League			FA Cup		Other		Total	
Club	Season	Division	Apps	Goals	Apps	Goals	Apps	Goals	Apps	Goals
Burnley	1956–57	First Division	7	2	4	8	0	0	11	10
Burnley	1957–58	First Division	0	0	0	0	0	0	0	0
Burnley	1958–59	First Division	0	0	0	0	0	0	0	0
Burnley	1959–60	First Division	8	3	1	0	0	0	9	3
Burnley	1960–61	First Division	8	2	0	0	2	0	10	2
Burnley	Total		23	7	5	8	2	0	30	15
Leeds United	1961–62	Second Division	11	1	0	0	0	0	11	1
Leeds United	1962–63	Second Division	6	5	0	0	2	0	8	5
Leeds United	1963–64	Second Division	24	11	3	1	2	3	29	15
Leeds United	1964–65	First Division	3	0	0	0	0	0	3	0
Leeds United	Total		44	17	3	1	4	3	51	21
Crystal Palace	1965–66	Second Division	17	6	0	0	0	0	17	6
Port Vale	1966–67	Fourth Division	8	0	1	1	1	0	10	1
Barnsley	1967–68	Fourth Division	0	0	0	0	0	0	0	0
Career total			92	30	9	10	7	3	108	43

== Honours ==
Burnley

- Football League First Division: 1959–60

Leeds United

- Football League Second Division: 1963–64
