= John Metcalfe (footballer) =

English footballer

Personal information
- Full name: John Metcalfe
- Date of birth: 2 June 1935
- Place of birth: Birmingham, England
- Date of death: February 1996 (aged 60)
- Place of death: Birmingham, England
- Position: Outside left

Youth career
- 1951–1952: Birmingham City

Senior career*
Years	Team	Apps	(Gls)
1952–1957	Birmingham City	2	(0)
1957–1958	York City	3	(2)
1958–1959	Walsall	2	(0)
- * Club domestic league appearances and goals

John Metcalfe (2 June 1935 – February 1996) was an English professional footballer who played in the Football League for Birmingham City, York City and Walsall.

Metcalfe was born in the Acocks Green district of Birmingham. He joined Birmingham City as an amateur in June 1951 and turned professional the following year. He made his debut in the Second Division on 3 January 1953, aged 17 years 6 months, deputising for Billy Wardle in a game away at Fulham which Birmingham lost 3–1. He played once more that season, again standing in for Wardle, but despite remaining with the club until the end of the 1956–57 season, that was the last time he appeared for the first-team.

Metcalfe went on to spend a season with York City in the Third Division North, for whom he scored his first goal in the Football League, and a further season at Walsall in the newly formed Fourth Division, before retiring in May 1959.
