= Billy McCartney =

Scottish footballer

Personal information
- Full name: William Raymond McCartney
- Date of birth: 1 August 1947 (age 79)
- Place of birth: Newcraighall, Scotland
- Position: Centre-forward

Youth career
- Rangers

Senior career*
Years	Team	Apps	(Gls)
1966–1967	Port Vale	15	(1)
- Oswestry Town
Total		15+	(1+)
- * Club domestic league appearances and goals

William Raymond McCartney (born 1 August 1947) is a Scottish former footballer who played for Port Vale and Durban City F.C..

== Career ==
McCartney played youth football for Rangers before becoming one of numerous Scotsmen to sign with English side Port Vale in June 1966, then managed by Jackie Mudie. He played 15 Fourth Division matches during the 1966–67 season, scoring once against Aldershot at the Recreation Ground on 29 October; he also appeared once in the FA Cup. He was released in May 1967, and moved on to Welsh side Oswestry Town.

== Career statistics ==
Appearances and goals by club, season and competition
Club	Season	League			FA Cup		League Cup		Total	
Club	Season	Division	Apps	Goals	Apps	Goals	Apps	Goals	Apps	Goals
Port Vale	1966–67	Fourth Division	15	1	1	0	0	0	16	1
