= Billy McNulty =

Scottish footballer

Personal information
- Full name: William George McNulty
- Date of birth: 9 February 1949 (age 77)
- Place of birth: Edinburgh, Scotland
- Position: Goalkeeper

Youth career
- Port Vale

Senior career*
Years	Team	Apps	(Gls)
1966–1968	Port Vale	1	(0)
1968–1969	Chesterfield	6	(0)
1969–1970	Berwick Rangers	1	(0)
Total		8	(0)
- * Club domestic league appearances and goals

William George McNulty (born 9 February 1949) is a Scottish former football goalkeeper. He played a total of eight league games between 1966 and 1970, one each for Port Vale and Berwick Rangers, and six for Chesterfield.

== Career ==
McNulty graduated through the juniors to sign professional forms with Port Vale in April 1966. Manager Jackie Mudie handed him his Fourth Division debut in a 2–0 defeat by Aldershot at Vale Park on 22 April 1967. He did not feature again for the "Valiants" and was given a free transfer to Chesterfield in May 1968. He played six Fourth Division games for the "Spireites" in 1968–69 before manager Jimmy McGuigan allowed him to leave Saltergate. He played one Scottish Second Division game for Harry Melrose's Berwick Rangers in 1969–70, before leaving Shielfield Park and retiring from professional football.

== Career statistics ==
Appearances and goals by club, season and competition
Club	Season	League			FA Cup		League Cup		Total	
Club	Season	Division	Apps	Goals	Apps	Goals	Apps	Goals	Apps	Goals
Port Vale	1966–67	Fourth Division	1	0	0	0	0	0	1	0
Chesterfield	1968–69	Fourth Division	6	0	0	0	0	0	6	0
