= Paddy Lane (cricketer) =

Australian cricketer

Personal information
- Full name: John Bayley Lane
- Born: 7 January 1886; Sydney, Australia
- Died: 30 August 1937 (aged 51); Sydney, Australia
- Source: ESPNcricinfo, 4 January 2017

Paddy Lane (7 January 1886 – 30 August 1937) was an Australian cricketer. He played three first-class matches for New South Wales between 1907/08 and 1912/13.

== See also ==
- List of New South Wales representative cricketers
