= Alex Jackson (footballer, born 1935) =

Scottish footballer (born 1935)

Personal information
- Full name: Alexander James Jackson
- Date of birth: 28 November 1935 (age 90)
- Place of birth: Glasgow, Scotland
- Position: Centre forward

Senior career*
Years	Team	Apps	(Gls)
195?–1958	Shettleston		
1958–1960	Birmingham City	6	(6)
1960–1964	Plymouth Argyle	67	(23)
1964–1970	Weymouth		(41)
- * Club domestic league appearances and goals

Alexander James Jackson (born 28 November 1935) is a Scottish former professional footballer who played in the Football League for Birmingham City and Plymouth Argyle. He played primarily as a centre forward, but Plymouth also used him as an inside forward.

== Career ==
Jackson was born in Glasgow where he grew up with Sisters Jean and Shirley, and brother Jim. He joined Birmingham City from junior club Shettleston for a fee of £2,000 in April 1958. He made his debut in the First Division on 15 November 1958, deputising for Eddy Brown in a home game against Newcastle United which Birmingham won 1–0. Jackson had a run of five games at centre forward a few weeks later, but despite scoring six goals in those five games, his first-team football was restricted to the FA Cup thereafter, and new arrival Robin Stubbs stepped into the league side.

In March 1960, having played no first-team football for a year, Jackson joined Plymouth Argyle. In four seasons, he scored 27 goals from 75 appearances in all competitions, though he suffered a broken leg in 1963, after which his form deteriorated. He moved into non-league football with Weymouth in 1964, stayed at the club for six seasons, scored 61 goals in all competitions, and was awarded a share of two benefit matches.
