= Jackie Lane (footballer) =

English footballer (1931–2023)

Personal information
- Full name: John George Lane
- Date of birth: 10 November 1931
- Place of birth: Birmingham, England
- Date of death: 22 March 2023 (aged 91)
- Position: Forward

Youth career
- Selly Park Blacks

Senior career*
Years	Team	Apps	(Gls)
–1949	Boldmere St. Michaels		
1949–1956	Birmingham City	46	(14)
1956–1959	Notts County	57	(19)
1959–1960	Hinckley Athletic		
1960–1961	Kidderminster Harriers		
1961	Evesham United		
1961–1962	Belper Town		
- * Club domestic league appearances and goals

John George Lane (10 November 1931 – 22 March 2023) was an English professional footballer who played as a forward. He made 103 appearances in the Football League for Birmingham City and Notts County. Lane also played in the Southern League for Hinckley Athletic, in the Birmingham & District League for Boldmere St. Michaels, Kidderminster Harriers and Evesham United, and in the Midland League for Belper Town.

== Life and career ==
=== Early life and career ===
John George Lane was born on 10 November 1931 in Selly Oak, Birmingham. He played youth football for Selly Park Blacks, and later joined Boldmere St. Michaels, from where the 17-year-old signed professional forms with Birmingham City in September 1949. While doing his National Service in the Army, he was successful in athletics and was runner-up in the Western Command heavyweight boxing championship.

=== Birmingham City ===
Lane was demobbed in early 1953, and made his first-team debut for Birmingham on 6 April at home to Doncaster Rovers in the Second Division. A "big six-footer" who played in contact lenses", he showed strength, an "ability to hit the heavy ball with surprising power", and a "tremendously long throw-in". His volley tied the scores, Birmingham won 2–1, and the following day's Birmingham Gazette headline-writers suggested he might be the solution to the club's problems at centre forward. He kept his place for the remaining five games of the season and scored twice more, but Ted Purdon began the following season at centre forward, scored 15 goals from 23 matches, and it was only after Purdon's transfer to Sunderland in January 1954 that Lane returned to the side. He scored twice from eight league matches, half at centre forward and half at his preferred position of inside forward, in 1953–54, and appeared more regularly the following season.

When Birmingham faced Liverpool on 11 December 1954, Lane opened the scoring after just 48 seconds, somewhat fortunately, as his shot deflected off a defender's foot leaving the goalkeeper stranded. By half-time, the score was 4–1, and the eventual 9–1 win remains, as of October 2021, Liverpool's record defeat in senior competition. He contributed six goals in the last couple of months of the season as Birmingham – in ninth place at the beginning of March and 11 points behind the leaders, albeit with games in hand – went on to win the 1954–55 Second Division title, ahead of Luton Town and Brentford on goal average.

Although primarily used as cover for any of the forward positions in the following season, Lane played in ten First Division matches and scored once, in a 4–3 win against Manchester City. He also played in Birmingham's second match in the inaugural edition of the Inter-Cities Fairs Cup, a 1–0 win away to the Zagreb XI. He and Bill Finney set up the goal for Eddy Brown after eight minutes, but Lane was substituted after half an hour because he "had found himself on the receiving end of some rough challenges from the home side and was starting to retaliate." That was the last of his 49 appearances for Birmingham City. The Sports Argus summed him up as "one of those who never let the side down. But being everybody's deputy has its drawbacks in that it never gets you very far."

=== Notts County ===
On 2 July 1956, Lane signed for Second Division club Notts County, who were "crying out for a centre forward to convert the work of Ron Wylie". In the first three months of the season he scored seven goals from 16 matches, but by January 1957 he had lost not only the centre-forward position but his place in the side entirely. Towards the end of February, the Football Post was lamenting how Lane, for whom County had paid a substantial fee, "has the physique and shooting power and was expected to inspire a snappier mood, but unfortunately he has yet to strike his true form."

Recalled in late October, Lane's form improved under the coaching of manager and former England international forward Tommy Lawton and "his own enthusiasm for his work", and he finally established himself in the side. His 11 league goals from 26 matches made him the club's top scorer for the season, but the team finished 23rd in the table and were relegated to the Third Division. Early in the 1958–59 season, Notts County accepted his transfer request. He remained with the club, but his season was interrupted by injuries, and when fit, he played little first-team football.

=== Non-league football ===
Lane was transfer-listed at the end of the season at a fee of £4,000, and in the absence of interest from Football League clubs, signed for Hinckley Athletic, newly elected to the Southern League. He scored four goals in the club's first ever fixture at that level, an 8–1 win at home to fellow newcomers Ashford Town, and was a regular in the side, but was listed for transfer at the end of the campaign. After scoring "plenty of goals" for Kidderminster Harriers during the 1960–61 season, Lane moved on to another Birmingham & District League club, Evesham United, in June 1961, but he was released in late September to cut costs and signed for Belper Town of the Midland League.

=== Death ===
Lane died on 22 March 2023, at the age of 91.

== Career statistics ==
Appearances and goals by club, season and competition
Club	Season	League			FA Cup		Other		Total	
Club	Season	Division	Apps	Goals	Apps	Goals	Apps	Goals	Apps	Goals
Birmingham City	1952–53	Second Division	6	3	0	0	—		6	3
Birmingham City	1953–54	Second Division	8	2	1	0	—		9	2
Birmingham City	1954–55	Second Division	22	8	0	0	—		22	8
Birmingham City	1955–56	First Division	10	1	1	0	1 (Note: Appearance in Inter-Cities Fairs Cup)	0	12	1
Birmingham City	Total		46	14	2	0	1	0	49	14
Notts County	1956–57	Second Division	21	7	1	0	—		22	7
Notts County	1957–58	Second Division	26	11	1	0	—		27	11
Notts County	1958–59	Third Division	10	1	1	0	—		11	1
Notts County	Total		57	19	3	0	—		60	19
Career total			103	33	5	0	1	0	109	33

== Honours ==
Birmingham City

- Football League Second Division: 1954–55

== Sources ==
- Matthews, Tony (1995). Birmingham City: A Complete Record. Derby: Breedon Books. ISBN 978-1-85983-010-9.
- Shaw, Dennis (2014). A Game of Three Halves. Paragon. p. 32. ISBN 978-1-78222-341-2.
