= Mel Lintern =

British footballer

Personal information
- Full name: Melvin Lintern
- Date of birth: 17 May 1950 (age 76)
- Place of birth: Seaton Delaval, England
- Position: Inside forward

Youth career
- Port Vale

Senior career*
Years	Team	Apps	(Gls)
1967–1968	Port Vale	1	(0)
	Carlisle United	0	(0)
- Stafford Rangers
- Hanley Town
- * Club domestic league appearances and goals

Melvin Lintern (born 17 May 1950) is an English former footballer who played one game at inside-forward for Port Vale in May 1967. After a non-playing spell with Carlisle United, he later played non-League football for Stafford Rangers and Hanley Town.

== Career ==
Lintern graduated through Port Vale juniors to make a substitute appearance for the first-team in a 2–0 defeat by Brentford at Griffin Park on 13 May 1967, the last day of the Fourth Division campaign. He signed professional forms at Vale Park under Stanley Matthews in March 1968, but was given a free transfer two months later. Lintern later had spells with Carlisle United (without appearing for the first-team), Stafford Rangers (Northern Premier League) and Hanley Town.

== Career statistics ==
Appearances and goals by club, season and competition
Club	Season	League			FA Cup		League Cup		Total	
Club	Season	Division	Apps	Goals	Apps	Goals	Apps	Goals	Apps	Goals
Port Vale	1966–67	Fourth Division	1	0	0	0	0	0	1	0
