= Billy Hume =

Scottish footballer (1935–1990)

Personal information
- Full name: William Sanderson Hume
- Date of birth: 18 December 1935
- Place of birth: Armadale, Scotland
- Date of death: 15 August 1990 (aged 54)
- Place of death: Livingston, Scotland
- Positions: Wing half; inside forward

Senior career*
Years	Team	Apps	(Gls)
- Seafield United
195x–1955	Whitburn		
1955–1958	Dunfermline Athletic	9	(2)
1958–1960	Birmingham City	10	(2)
1960–1961	St Mirren	8	(3)
1961	Berwick Rangers	5	(1)
1962	Bangor	8	(6)
1962–1964	Glentoran		(5)
	Alloa Athletic	0	(0)
- Armadale Thistle
- Bathgate Thistle
- * Club domestic league appearances and goals

William Sanderson Hume (18 December 1935 – 15 August 1990) was a Scottish professional footballer who played in the Scottish Football League for Dunfermline Athletic, St Mirren and Berwick Rangers, in the Football League, for Birmingham City, and in the Irish Football League and the Inter-Cities Fairs Cup for Glentoran. He played as a wing half or inside forward.

== Career ==
Hume was born in Armadale, West Lothian. He played for nearby Seafield United and Whitburn before joining Dunfermline Athletic in 1955, for whom he made his Scottish League debut during the 1956–57 season. He played four Division One games, scoring once, and the next season played five Division Two games, again scoring once, and one game in the Scottish League Cup.

Despite interest from Rangers, Hume then came to England and signed for Birmingham City of the Football League First Division in February 1958, making his first-team debut in a friendly against Valencia. Unable to dislodge Dick Neal from the left-half position, Hume had to wait for his Football League debut until 18 March 1959, deputising for Neal in an away game against Leicester City which Birmingham won 4–2. He played eight league games in the 1959–60 season, succeeding Bunny Larkin at inside left, but scored only twice, and returned to Scotland in 1960.

Hume made a few appearances for St Mirren and for Berwick Rangers before trying his luck in Ireland, first with Bangor and then Glentoran. He scored for Glentoran in a Gold Cup final to earn himself a winners' medal, and represented the club in their first modern foray into European competition, the Inter-Cities Fairs Cup of 1962–63. Drawn to play Real Zaragoza, Glentoran lost the first leg 2–0, but took the lead in the away leg as Hume "swept [the ball] inside for Matt Doherty to volley it into the roof of the net", only to lose 6–2.

Returning to Scotland once more, Hume was briefly on the books of Alloa Athletic before becoming a player-coach in junior football, firstly for three years at Armadale Thistle and then at Bathgate Thistle.

Hume died in hospital in Livingston, West Lothian, in August 1990 at the age of 54.
