= Geoff Cox (footballer) =

English footballer

Personal information
- Full name: Geoffrey Cox
- Date of birth: 30 November 1934
- Place of birth: Nuneaton, England
- Date of death: 3 November 2014 (aged 79)
- Positions: Winger; inside forward

Youth career
- 1950–1951: Birmingham City

Senior career*
Years	Team	Apps	(Gls)
1951–1957	Birmingham City	35	(3)
1957–1967	Torquay United	261	(62)
1967–19??	Bridgwater Town		
–	Welton Rovers		
- * Club domestic league appearances and goals

Geoffrey Cox (30 November 1934 – 3 November 2014) was an English professional footballer who scored 65 goals in 296 appearances in the Football League playing for Birmingham City and Torquay United.

== Life and career ==
Cox was born in the Stockingford district of Nuneaton, Warwickshire. He began his football career as a youngster with Birmingham City in 1950, and turned professional at the end of the following year. A winger, Cox made his debut in the Football League Second Division on 27 August 1952 in a 1–0 win at Luton Town, and played in more than half of the games in the 1952–53 season. He was then called up for National Service; by the time he returned, Gordon Astall and Alex Govan were established on the wings. He remained with Birmingham as cover, and played in their early matches in the inaugural staging of the Inter-Cities Fairs Cup, including in their first match in European competition, a goalless draw against Internazionale in Milan in May 1956 while Astall was away on England international duty.

In December 1957, Cox moved to Torquay United, then playing in the Third Division South. In a ten-year career, he scored 62 goals in 261 league games and twice contributed to Torquay's promotion from the Fourth Division back to the Third. The club awarded him a benefit match against West Ham United at the end of the 1967–68 season. After leaving Torquay he wound down his football career with Bridgwater Town and Welton Rovers of the Western League.

Cox went on to work as an estate agent. He and wife Madge had two sons: Maurice, a former professional footballer who played for Torquay United and Huddersfield Town, and Michael. He died on 3 November 2014.
