= John Love (footballer) =

Scottish footballer and manager

Personal information
- Full name: John Thomson Love
- Date of birth: 18 March 1924
- Place of birth: Edinburgh, Scotland
- Date of death: 14 June 2007 (aged 83)
- Place of death: Glenfarg. Scotland
- Position: Inside forward

Senior career*
Years	Team	Apps	(Gls)
1947–1948	Leith Athletic	19	(5)
1948–1949	Albion Rovers	28	(11)
1949–1952	Nottingham Forest	59	(21)
1952–1954	Llanelli		
1954–1956	Walsall	40	(10)
Total		146	(47)

Managerial career
- 1952–1954: Llanelli (player-manager)
- 1955–1957: Walsall
- 1957–1960: Wrexham
- * Club domestic league appearances and goals

John Thomson Love DFC (18 March 1924 – 14 June 2007) was a Scottish football player and manager. He scored 47 goals in 146 league games in the Scottish and English leagues, playing for Leith Athletic, Albion Rovers, Nottingham Forest, and Walsall. He later managed Llanelli, Walsall, and Wrexham. He was awarded the Distinguished Flying Cross for his service during World War II.

== Football career ==
Love, "a hard inside forward with a strong shot", won a Distinguished Flying Cross after being wounded by shrapnel whilst serving in the Royal Air Force in 1944.

He started his career at Leith Athletic, and scored five goals in nineteen games during the 1947–48 Second Division, after which Leigh were relegated. He moved on to Albion Rovers of the First Division, and scored eleven goals in 28 league games in 1948–49.

He won a move to Nottingham Forest in February 1949, just as the club suffered relegation at the end of 1948–49. He scored 21 goals in 62 league and cup games for Forest, helping the club win promotion into the Second Division as champions of the Third Division South in 1950–51. The club missed out on a second successive promotion in 1951–52 by just two points, after which Love moved on to Welsh side Llanelli, where he was appointed player-manager.

Love joined Walsall in March 1955, as the club floundered at the foot of the Third Division South table; he scored twice in sixteen games. Having successfully applied for re-election, Walsall chose Love to replace the legendary Frank Buckley in September 1955. Love picked himself for 24 league games, and scored eight goals, in 1955–56, as his side finished twentieth. He then retired as a player, due to injury, and then managed the "Saddlers" to a fifteenth-place finish in 1956–57.

Love took up the management reins at Third Division North Wrexham for the 1957–58 campaign. The "Red Dragons" finished twelfth, and lifted the Welsh Cup after victory over Chester City in a replay at the Racecourse Ground. His side founded the newly formed Third Division in 1958–59, and ended the season in eighteenth place. He stepped down at the end of the campaign. He returned to Edinburgh and took up a post with a furniture company and went on to become sales director.

== Honours ==
- Distinguished Flying Cross medal: 1944

with Nottingham Forest

- Football League Third Division South champion: 1950–51

with Wrexham

- Welsh Cup winner: 1958
