= Bunny Larkin =

English footballer (1936–2025)

Personal information
- Full name: Bernard Patrick Larkin
- Date of birth: 11 January 1936
- Place of birth: Birmingham, England
- Date of death: August 2025 (aged 89)
- Place of death: Norwich, England
- Positions: Inside forward; wing half

Youth career
- Lea Hall YC
- Rockwood Albion
- 1952–1954: Birmingham City

Senior career*
Years	Team	Apps	(Gls)
1954–1960	Birmingham City	79	(23)
1960–1961	Norwich City	41	(12)
1961–1962	Doncaster Rovers	25	(12)
1962–1964	Watford	49	(3)
1964–1966	Lincoln City	27	(3)
1966–1968	Wisbech Town		
1968–1969	Nuneaton Borough		
1969	King's Lynn		
- Stevenage Athletic
- * Club domestic league appearances and goals

Bernard Patrick "Bunny" Larkin (11 January 1936 – 9 August 2025) was an English professional footballer who played at inside forward or wing half. He played in the First Division of the Football League and in European competition for Birmingham City, and in the Football League for Norwich City, Doncaster Rovers, Watford and Lincoln City.

== Career ==
Larkin was born in Digbeth, Birmingham. He joined local club Birmingham City as a 16-year-old wing half, signing professional forms at 18. He made his debut at inside left in October 1956, when he was nearly 21; the club had a big squad in those days, and it was not unusual for a player to be well into his twenties before getting into the first team on a regular basis.

"When I joined the club the staff was bigger than is normal nowadays. We even had pros playing for the fifth team and by the time you reached the 'A' team there were some very good players indeed."

He scored on debut, but still only played another six games that season. He played more frequently the following season, filling in at right-half for Johnny Watts. He took part in both legs of the semi-final of the 1955–58 Inter-Cities Fairs Cup against Barcelona, though he missed the replay. His career changed in November 1958, when he was selected at inside left in place of the ageing Peter Murphy. Between then and the end of the season he scored 23 goals in all competitions, including four goals in the early rounds of the 1958–60 Fairs Cup, which made him the club's top scorer for the 1958–59 season. He attributed his goalscoring success to being two-footed:

"I'd always scored goals wherever I'd played. I had the advantage of being able to use both feet to shoot. That meant that you didn't have to change your position when the ball came to you. There don't seem to be many players around nowadays that can do that."

He contributed another goal in the Fairs Cup semi-final, but by the time the final against Barcelona came round, he had lost form and left the club, transferred to Norwich City for a fee of £10,000. An incident in which he overslept and missed the flight to a European away game did not help his cause.

He spent two seasons at Norwich, then went on to Doncaster Rovers, Watford, Lincoln City and to non-league clubs including Wisbech Town, Nuneaton Borough, King's Lynn and Stevenage Athletic. He had the distinction of being the first Lincoln City player ever to be substituted in the Football League. After retiring from football he settled in the Norwich area and became a salesman for a bakery firm.

== Death ==
Larkin died on 9 August 2025, at the age of 89.
