= Dennis Hill =

English footballer (1929–2020)

Personal information
- Date of birth: 16 August 1929
- Place of birth: Willenhall, England
- Date of death: July 2020 (aged 90)
- Place of death: Wolverhampton, England
- Height: 5 ft 9 in (1.75 m)
- Position: Outside left

Senior career*
Years	Team	Apps	(Gls)
- Darlaston
1951–1957	Birmingham City	4	(0)
1957–1959	Burton Albion		
1959–196?	Matlock Town		
- * Club domestic league appearances and goals

Dennis Hill (16 August 1929 – July 2020) was an English professional footballer who played in the Football League for Birmingham City.

== Life and career ==
Hill was born in Willenhall, Staffordshire. He joined Birmingham City in June 1951, and made his debut in the Second Division on 13 February 1954, deputising for regular outside left Alex Govan in a home game against West Ham United which Birmingham won 2–0. Hill played only three more games over the next three years, as Govan's goalscoring ability kept him out of first-team consideration, and in February 1957 he decided to pursue a career as a draughtsman while playing part-time football, first with Burton Albion and then with Matlock Town. He scored seven goals from 38 appearances for Matlock in the 1959–60 season, when the team won the championship of the Central Alliance Division North and reached the first round proper of the FA Cup for the first time in the club's history.

Hill died in Wolverhampton in July 2020 at the age of 90.
