= Terry Oldfield (footballer) =

English footballer

Personal information
- Full name: Terence James Oldfield
- Date of birth: 1 April 1939 (age 87)
- Place of birth: Bristol, England
- Height: 5 ft 10 in (1.78 m)
- Positions: Centre forward; wing half

Youth career
- –: Bristol Boys
- –: Bristol City
- –1958: Clifton St. Vincents

Senior career*
Years	Team	Apps	(Gls)
1958–1966	Bristol Rovers	132	(11)
1966–1967	Wrexham	40	(6)
Total		172	(17)

Managerial career
- Clifton St. Vincents
- * Club domestic league appearances and goals

Terence James Oldfield (born 1 April 1939) is a former professional footballer, who played as a centre forward and wing half in The Football League for Bristol Rovers and Wrexham between 1958 and 1967.

Oldfield began playing football in his home town of Bristol, first for Bristol Boys, and then briefly as an amateur for Bristol City and Clifton St. Vincents. He signed with Bristol Rovers as an amateur in February 1958 and turned professional with them in 1960. He made 132 League appearances and scored eleven goals with The Pirates, before joining Welsh club Wrexham and being appointed their captain in 1966. He was to last only a single year with The Robins though, as a knee injury forced him to retire from playing in 1967, aged 28.

After his retirement from playing, he worked as the trainer of Bradford Park Avenue, a scout for Bristol Rovers, and a manager of his former non-League side Clifton St. Vincents. In addition, he also worked as an estate agent and auctioneer in Keynsham and ran the Red Lion pub in Odd Down. He also played cricket for Brislington Cricket Club, and golf for Saltford golf club.
