= Keith Bannister (footballer, born 1930) =

English footballer (1930–2016)

Personal information
- Date of birth: 13 November 1930
- Place of birth: Sheffield, England
- Date of death: August 2016 (aged 85)
- Place of death: Gloucestershire, England
- Position: Wing half

Youth career
- 1948–1950: Sheffield United

Senior career*
Years	Team	Apps	(Gls)
1948–1950	Sheffield United	0	(0)
1950–1954	Birmingham City	22	(0)
1954–1955	King's Lynn		
1955	Wrexham	14	(0)
1955–1956	Chesterfield	21	(1)
1956–1957	Norwich City	7	(0)
1957–1958	Peterborough United	1	(0)
1958–195?	King's Lynn		
195?–1959	Worksop Town		
1959–196?	Matlock Town		
- * Club domestic league appearances and goals

Keith Bannister (13 November 1930 – August 2016) was an English professional footballer who made 64 appearances in the Football League representing Birmingham City, Wrexham, Chesterfield and Norwich City. He played as a wing half.

== Life and career ==
Bannister was born in Sheffield. He was capped at youth level by England, played as a junior with Sheffield United and turned professional in 1948, but never played for the club in the Football League. He joined Birmingham City in August 1950, but National Service obligations delayed his debut until 29 November 1952, when he deputised for club captain Len Boyd in a home game against Nottingham Forest which Birmingham lost 5–0. He had a run of games in the second half of the season replacing the injured Roy Warhurst, and a few more at the start of the 1953–54 season, but was unable to dislodge either player from the starting eleven.

In August 1954 Bannister left for King's Lynn of the Midland League. After one season he returned to the Football League with Wrexham, six months later moved to Chesterfield, and after a further six months signed for Norwich City, but he was unable to establish himself as a first-team player. In the 1957 close season he dropped back into non-League football with Peterborough United, for whom he played one Midland League and one FA Cup match, and went on to play for King's Lynn, Worksop Town, and Matlock Town. In the 1959–60 season, Bannister, by now playing as a centre-half, captained Matlock through four rounds of qualifying to reach the first round proper of the FA Cup for the first time in the club's history, and contributed to their championship of the Central Alliance League, Division One North.

Bannister died in Gloucestershire in August 2016 at the age of 85.
