= Johnny Gordon =

English footballer (1931–2001)

Personal information
- Full name: John Duncan Sinclair Gordon
- Date of birth: 11 September 1931
- Place of birth: Portsmouth, England
- Date of death: 26 May 2001 (aged 69)
- Place of death: Portsmouth, England
- Position: Inside forward

Youth career
- 1947–1949: Portsmouth

Senior career*
Years	Team	Apps	(Gls)
1949–1958	Portsmouth	209	(69)
1958–1961	Birmingham City	96	(32)
1961–1967	Portsmouth	234	(37)
1967–19??	Chelmsford City		
- * Club domestic league appearances and goals

John Duncan Sinclair Gordon (11 September 1931 – 26 May 2001) was an English professional footballer who played for Portsmouth and Birmingham City in the First Division as an inside forward.

He made a total of 489 appearances for home-town club Portsmouth, placing him fourth in their all-time appearances list. During his three seasons at Birmingham City he was the club's top scorer in 1959–60, became their all-time top goalscorer in European competition, and played in the 1960 Inter-Cities Fairs Cup Final against Barcelona. On his return to Portsmouth he helped them win the Third Division championship in 1961–62.

== Honours ==
- Portsmouth
  - Club's top League scorer 1957
  - Third Division champions 1962
- Birmingham City
  - Inter-Cities Fairs Cup runners-up 1960
  - Club's top scorer 1960
  - Club's all-time European top scorer
