= Geoff Lloyd (footballer) =

Welsh footballer

Personal information
- Full name: Robert Geoffrey Lloyd
- Date of birth: 18 August 1942 (age 84)
- Place of birth: Wrexham, Wales
- Place of death: Wrexham Maelor Hospital, Wrexham
- Position: Forward

Senior career*
Years	Team	Apps	(Gls)
- Llangollen
- Colwyn Bay
1966–1967	Wrexham	14	(5)
1967–1968	Bradford Park Avenue	32	(10)
- Rhyl
- * Club domestic league appearances and goals

Robert Geoffrey Lloyd (born 18 August 1942) is a Welsh former professional footballer who played as a forward. He made appearances in the English football league with Wrexham and Bradford Park Avenue.
