= John James (footballer, born 1934) =

English footballer

Personal information
- Full name: John Edward James
- Date of birth: 19 February 1934 (age 92)
- Place of birth: Birmingham, England
- Position: Inside forward

Youth career
- 1949–19??: Brighton & Hove Albion
- 19??–1950: Paget Rangers
- 1950–1951: Birmingham City

Senior career*
Years	Team	Apps	(Gls)
1951–1955	Birmingham City	5	(2)
1955–1961	Torquay United	125	(11)
–	Minehead		
- * Club domestic league appearances and goals

John Edward James (born 19 February 1934) is an English former professional footballer who made 130 appearances in the Football League playing for Birmingham City and Torquay United. He played as an inside forward.

James was born in Harborne, Birmingham. As a youngster he was on the books of Brighton & Hove Albion, but he was working in a brass foundry when Birmingham City signed him in as a junior in June 1950. He turned professional the following year, and made his first-team debut on 4 March 1953, replacing the injured Peter Murphy in a sixth-round FA Cup replay against Tottenham Hotspur which finished as a 2–2 draw. He played in the next three league games, scoring twice in the last of these to secure a 3–1 win against Barnsley, but managed only two first-team games in the next season and one the season after, and moved on to Torquay United at the end of the 1954–55 season. James spent six seasons with Torquay, and scored 11 goals from 125 league appearances.
