= Ted Purdon =

South African soccer player

Personal information
- Full name: Edward John Purdon
- Date of birth: 1 March 1930
- Place of birth: Johannesburg, South Africa
- Date of death: 29 April 2007 (aged 77)
- Place of death: Toronto, Ontario, Canada
- Height: 6 ft 0 in (1.83 m)
- Positions: Inside forward; centre forward

Senior career*
Years	Team	Apps	(Gls)
1948–1950	Marist Brothers		
1950–1954	Birmingham City	64	(27)
1954–1957	Sunderland	90	(39)
1957–1958	Workington	33	(9)
1958–1959	Barrow	37	(11)
1959–1960	Bath City	6	(3)
1960	Bristol Rovers	4	(0)
1960–1961	Wellington Town		
1961	Toronto White Eagles		
1961—1963	New York Ukrainians		
1963	Toronto City		
1963	Toronto Inter-Roma		
1964	Toronto City		
1964–1965	New York Ukrainians		
1965	Toronto City		
1968–1970	Toronto Ukraina		
- * Club domestic league appearances and goals

Edward John Purdon (1 March 1930 – 29 April 2007) was a South African professional footballer who played as a forward. He played for Birmingham City in the Second Division of the Football League and for Sunderland in the First Division.

== Biography ==
Purdon was born in Johannesburg, South Africa. He came to England on tour with his South African club in 1950 at the age of 20, was watched by representatives of several clubs, and signed for Birmingham City. During his three seasons at the club he scored 30 goals in 70 games in all competitions and was the club's top scorer in 1953–54, despite playing only 23 games before his mid-season transfer to Sunderland. He was also a good cricketer, and was named once as twelfth man for Warwickshire. He moved to Sunderland, then known as the "Bank of England club" because of their high transfer spending, for a fee of £15,000.

Purdon made a spectacular start to his Sunderland career, scoring twice on debut against Cardiff City and following that up with a hat-trick (association football) against Arsenal at Highbury in his second game. The first goal of the three, scored after only ten seconds, was believed to be the fastest goal in Sunderland's history. Playing alongside the likes of Len Shackleton and Billy Bingham, he scored 42 goals in 96 games for the club over a three-year career. Purdon was a big man whose "physique allied to a total lack of fear made him a handful for any centre-half"; West Bromwich Albion goalkeeper Norman Heath was in collision with him during a game and received spinal injuries so severe that he never played again.

He and his team-mates were punished by the Football Association for receiving illegal payments from the club. By the time this matter was investigated, Purdon had left Sunderland for Workington of the Third Division North. He played his part in the club coming close to knocking Manchester United's Busby Babes out of the 1957–58 FA Cup. Workington took an early lead and Purdon came close to adding a second before Dennis Viollet's second-half hat-trick settled the matter.

In March 1958 he moved to nearby Barrow, also in the Third Division North, where he also spent a year. He was part of the Barrow team which conceded ten goals in a league match at Hartlepools United. In August 1959 he dropped into non-league football, helping Bath City win the Southern League championship. This success prompted a move back into the Second Division at Bristol Rovers, but he only made four first-team appearances for the club. He emigrated to Canada in 1961, where he played for Toronto City and other Canadian clubs in the Eastern Canada Professional Soccer League, and also helped New York Ukrainians to win the 1965 National Challenge Cup. In 1968, he returned to the National Soccer League to play with Toronto Ukraina. He re-signed with Toronto Ukraina for the 1969 season, and 1970 season. He later coached in Canada.

Purdon was a founder member and honorary president of Sunderland's North American supporters' club. In company with fellow supporters he had just watched on television Sunderland beating Burnley in the game which almost clinched the club's 2007 promotion to the Premier League when he suffered a stroke. He died in a Toronto hospital two days later at the age of 77.

== Honours ==
- with Birmingham City
  - Club's top scorer 1954.
- with Bath City
  - Southern League champions 1960.
- with New York Ukrainians
  - National Challenge Cup winners 1965.
