= Ken Rowley =

English footballer (1926–1995)

Personal information
- Full name: Kenneth Francis Rowley
- Date of birth: 29 August 1926
- Place of birth: Pelsall, England
- Date of death: 1995 (aged 68–69)
- Position: Inside forward

Senior career*
Years	Team	Apps	(Gls)
1947–1951	Wolverhampton Wanderers	1	(0)
1951–1954	Birmingham City	40	(19)
1954–1995	Coventry City	3	(0)
1957–19??	Bromsgrove Rovers		
- * Club domestic league appearances and goals

Kenneth Francis Rowley (29 August 1926 – 1995) was an English footballer who played as an inside forward. He made 44 appearances in the Football League playing for Wolverhampton Wanderers, Birmingham City and Coventry City.

== Playing career ==
Rowley was born in Pelsall, which was then in Staffordshire, in 1926. He turned professional with Wolverhampton Wanderers in 1947, but in five years played only one league match for them. He joined Birmingham City in January 1951. He had an excellent strike rate for the club, scoring 12 goals in 28 games in the Second Division, before suffering an injury so severe that medical opinion was that he would never play again. He made a comeback a year later, in December 1953, and scored a further 7 goals in 12 games before moving on to Coventry City in November 1954. At the end of the 1954–55 season injury forced his retirement at the age of 28. Two years later he attempted a comeback in non-league football with Bromsgrove Rovers. He died in 1995.
