= Billy Wardle =

English footballer

Personal information
- Full name: William Wardle
- Date of birth: 20 January 1918
- Place of birth: Hetton-le-Hole, England
- Date of death: January 1989 (aged about 81)
- Position: Outside left

Youth career
- –: Fatfield Juniors
- –: Houghton Colliery Welfare

Senior career*
Years	Team	Apps	(Gls)
1936–1937	Southport	14	(0)
1937–1939	Manchester City	6	(0)
1939–1948	Grimsby Town	73	(11)
1948–1951	Blackpool	60	(1)
1951–1953	Birmingham City	60	(5)
1953–1955	Barnsley	28	(1)
1955–1957	Skegness Town		
- * Club domestic league appearances and goals

William Wardle (20 January 1918 – January 1989) was an English professional footballer born in Hetton-le-Hole, County Durham, who played as an outside left. He made 239 appearances in the Football League playing for Southport, Manchester City, Grimsby Town, Blackpool, Birmingham City and Barnsley.
