= Jimmy Cochrane (footballer, born 1935) =

English footballer

Personal information
- Full name: James Cochrane
- Date of birth: 26 October 1935 (age 91)
- Place of birth: Kingswinford, England
- Position: Inside right

Youth career
- Brierley Hill Schools
- 1951–1952: Birmingham City

Senior career*
Years	Team	Apps	(Gls)
1952–1958	Birmingham City	3	(1)
1958–1959	Walsall	6	(1)
1959	Wellington Town		
1959–19??	Stourbridge		
- * Club domestic league appearances and goals

James Cochrane (born 26 October 1935) is an English former professional footballer who played in the Football League for Birmingham City and Walsall.

Cochrane was born in Kingswinford, which was then in Staffordshire, and attended Brierley Hill Secondary School. He made his name in schools football, as inside right and playmaker in the Brierley Hill, Sedgley & District Schools team that reached the final of the English Schools' Football Association Trophy in 1951. Cochrane, together with his schools' team captain and future England international Trevor Smith, joined Birmingham City in the summer of 1951, and signed professional forms when he turned 17.

He made his first-team debut on 7 March 1953, aged 17 years 4 months, in the Second Division match at Huddersfield Town which finished 1–1, and kept his place for the next game. On his next appearance, a year later, standing in for Wales international Noel Kinsey, Cochrane scored the opening goal in a 2–0 win home win against West Ham United. His progress was interrupted by his National Service commitment; after two years spent as a cook, he returned to the club overweight and unfit, and never played for the first team again.

In June 1958 Cochrane joined Fourth Division club Walsall as part of Brian Taylor's transfer to Birmingham. He scored once in six league games before dropping into non-league football at the end of the 1958–59 season with Wellington Town and then Stourbridge. He was still only 23.
