= Arthur Atkins (footballer) =

English footballer (1925–1988)

Personal information
- Full name: Arthur Walter Atkins
- Date of birth: 21 February 1925
- Place of birth: Tokyo, Japan
- Date of death: 7 January 1988 (aged 62)
- Place of death: Sutton Coldfield, England
- Position: Centre half

Youth career
- –: Paget Rangers

Senior career*
Years	Team	Apps	(Gls)
1948–1954	Birmingham City	97	(0)
1954–1956	Shrewsbury Town	16	(0)
- * Club domestic league appearances and goals

Arthur Walter Atkins (21 February 1925 – 7 January 1988) was an English professional footballer who played as a centre half. Born in Tokyo, his parents having business in Japan, he was educated in Erdington, Birmingham, where he was spotted by Second Division club Birmingham City. He played more than 100 games for the club in all competitions, and played a big part in the club reaching the 1950–51 FA Cup semifinal. He later played for Shrewsbury Town. He died at Good Hope Hospital in Sutton Coldfield, Warwickshire aged 62.
