= Peter McConnell (footballer) =

English footballer (1937–2019)

Personal information
- Full name: Peter McConnell
- Date of birth: 3 March 1937
- Place of birth: Reddish, England
- Date of death: 28 July 2019 (aged 82)
- Position: Wing-half

Senior career*
| Years | Team | Apps | (Gls) |
| 1958–1962 | Leeds United | 48 | (4) |
| 1962–1969 | Carlisle United | | |
| 1969–1971 | Bradford City | 79 | (0) |
- * Club domestic league appearances and goals

Peter McConnell (3 March 1937 – 28 July 2019) was an English professional footballer who played as an attacking wing-half for Leeds United, Carlisle United and Bradford City.

== Playing career ==
McConnell was born in Reddish, Cheshire, England. He began his footballing career as a teenager at Leeds United. He made his first team debut during the 1958–59 season in a declining side that was to be relegated to the Second Division at the end of the 1959–60 season. He did not become a regular in the side until the 1961–62 when Leeds were fighting relegation to the Third Division. He was released by manager Don Revie the following season and joined Carlisle United where he made 273 appearances, scoring 27 goals, and won a Third Division Championship medal, in seven seasons. He joined Bradford City in 1969 for who he made a further 79 appearances in two seasons.

=== Playing statistics ===
| Club | League | FA Cup | League Cup | Total |
| | Apps (goals) | Apps (goals) | Apps (goals) | Apps (goals) |
| Leeds United | 48 (4) | 2 (0) | 3 (1) | 53 (5) |
| Carlisle United | | | | 273 (27) |
| Bradford City | 79 (0) | | | 89 (0) |
