= Johnny Watts (English footballer) =

English footballer

Personal information
- Full name: John William Watts
- Date of birth: 13 April 1931
- Place of birth: Birmingham, England
- Date of death: March 2006 (aged 74)
- Place of death: Brownhills, England
- Position: Right half

Youth career
- 1948–1951: Birmingham City

Senior career*
Years	Team	Apps	(Gls)
1951–1964	Birmingham City	206	(3)
1964–1968	Nuneaton Borough		
1968–1969	Bromsgrove Rovers		
- * Club domestic league appearances and goals

John William Watts (13 April 1931 – March 2006) was an English footballer who made more than 200 appearances in the Football League for Birmingham City playing as a right half.

Watts was born in the Vauxhall district of Birmingham. He joined Birmingham City as a junior in 1948 and turned professional in 1951 after completing his National Service. In a twelve-year professional career with the club he played 248 games in all competitions, scoring three times. In 1964 he joined Nuneaton Borough of the Southern League where he was to spend four years. He played briefly for West Midlands (Regional) League club Bromsgrove Rovers before retiring in 1969.

Watts died in a retirement home in Brownhills, West Midlands, in March 2006.

== Honours ==
Birmingham City

- Football League Second Division: 1954–55
- Inter-Cities Fairs Cup finalist: 1958–60

Nuneaton Borough

- Southern League runner-up: 1966–67
