= 1958–59 Wolverhampton Wanderers F.C. season =

English football club season

Wolverhampton Wanderers
1958–59 season
- Chairman: James Baker
- Manager: Stan Cullis
- First Division: 1st
- FA Cup: 4th round
- FA Charity Shield: Runners-up
- European Cup: 1st round
- Top goalscorer: League: Jimmy Murray (21); All: Peter Broadbent (22)
- Highest home attendance: 55,621 (vs Bolton Wanderers, 24 January 1959)
- Lowest home attendance: 26,790 (vs Leeds United, 14 February 1959)
- Average home league attendance: 38,441 (league), 39,512 (all competitions)
Home colours

The 1958–59 season was the 60th season of competitive league football in the history of English football club Wolverhampton Wanderers. They played in the First Division, then the highest level of English football, for a 22nd consecutive year.

The season was a major success as the club won the League championship for a third and final time, successfully defending their title they already held. For a second consecutive season they scored over 100 league goals. They also participated in European competition for the first time in their history.

Wolves achieved the double over local rivals Aston Villa, part of a run of seven between 1957 and 1960.

== Results ==
=== Football League ===
A total of 22 teams competed in the First Division in the 1958–59 season. Each team would play every other team twice, once at their stadium, and once at the opposition's. Two points were awarded to teams for each win, one point per draw, and none for defeats.

| 23 August 1958 1 | Wolverhampton Wanderers | 5–1 | Nottingham Forest | Wolverhampton |
| 15:00 BST | Mason; Broadbent; Deeley | | | Stadium: Molineux; Attendance: 52,659 |

| 25 August 1958 2 | West Ham United | 2–0 | Wolverhampton Wanderers | London |
| 19:00 BST | Smith; Dick | | | Stadium: Upton Park; Attendance: 34,487 |

| 30 August 1958 3 | Chelsea | 6–2 | Wolverhampton Wanderers | London |
| 15:00 BST | Greaves; Block | | Mason; Slater (pen.)' | Stadium: Stamford Bridge; Attendance: 62,118 |

| 3 September 1958 4 | Wolverhampton Wanderers | 1–1 | West Ham United | Wolverhampton |
| 19:00 BST | Broadbent | | Grice | Stadium: Molineux; Attendance: 52,317 |

| 6 September 1958 5 | Wolverhampton Wanderers | 2–0 | Blackpool | Wolverhampton |
| 15:00 BST | Broadbent; Henderson | | | Stadium: Molineux; Attendance: 46,219 |

| 8 September 1958 6 | Aston Villa | 1–3 | Wolverhampton Wanderers | Birmingham |
| 19:15 BST | Hitchens | | Booth; Broadbent; Murray | Stadium: Villa Park; Attendance: 43,138 |

| 13 September 1958 7 | Blackburn Rovers | 1–2 | Wolverhampton Wanderers | Blackburn |
| 15:00 BST | Goal | | Horne; Woods (o.g.)' | Stadium: Ewood Park; Attendance: 43,192 |

| 17 September 1958 8 | Wolverhampton Wanderers | 4–0 | Aston Villa | Wolverhampton |
| 19:00 BST | Henderson; Murray | | | Stadium: Molineux; Attendance: 41,845 |

| 20 September 1958 9 | Wolverhampton Wanderers | 1–3 | Newcastle United | Wolverhampton |
| 15:00 BST | Broadbent | | White Bottom | Stadium: Molineux; Attendance: 39,130 |

| 27 September 1958 10 | Tottenham Hotspur | 2–1 | Wolverhampton Wanderers | London |
| 15:00 BST | Clayton; Smith | | Clamp (pen.)' | Stadium: White Hart Lane; Attendance: 48,563 |

| 4 October 1958 11 | Wolverhampton Wanderers | 4–0 | Manchester United | Wolverhampton |
| 19:00 BST | Murray; Mason; Mullen | | | Stadium: Molineux; Attendance: 36,840 |

| 11 October 1958 12 | Wolverhampton Wanderers | 2–0 | Manchester City | Wolverhampton |
| 15:00 GMT | Broadbent; Deeley | | | Stadium: Molineux; Attendance: 33,769 |

| 18 October 1958 13 | Arsenal | 1–1 | Wolverhampton Wanderers | London |
| 15:00 GMT | Biggs | | Showell | Stadium: Highbury; Attendance: 49,199 |

| 25 October 1958 14 | Wolverhampton Wanderers | 3–1 | Birmingham City | Wolverhampton |
| 15:00 GMT | Mullen; Showell | | Goal | Stadium: Molineux; Attendance: 36,156 |

| 1 November 1958 15 | West Bromwich Albion | 2–1 | Wolverhampton Wanderers | West Bromwich |
| 15:00 GMT | Goal | | Deeley | Stadium: The Hawthorns; Attendance: 55,498 |

| 8 November 1958 16 | Wolverhampton Wanderers | 2–0 | Preston North End | Wolverhampton |
| 15:00 GMT | Mason | | | Stadium: Molineux; Attendance: 35,593 |

| 15 November 1958 17 | Burnley | 0–2 | Wolverhampton Wanderers | Burnley |
| 15:00 GMT | | | Deeley; Jackson | Stadium: Turf Moor; Attendance: 23,067 |

| 22 November 1958 18 | Wolverhampton Wanderers | 1–2 | Bolton Wanderers | Wolverhampton |
| 15:00 GMT | Deeley | | Goal | Stadium: Molineux; Attendance: 33,489 |

| 29 November 1958 19 | Luton Town | 0–1 | Wolverhampton Wanderers | Luton |
| 14:15 GMT | | | Mullen | Stadium: Kenilworth Road; Attendance: 20,648 |

| 6 December 1958 20 | Wolverhampton Wanderers | 1–0 | Everton | Wolverhampton |
| 15:00 GMT | Broadbent | | | Stadium: Molineux; Attendance: 27,074 |

| 13 December 1958 21 | Leicester City | 1–0 | Wolverhampton Wanderers | Leicester |
| 15:00 GMT | Goal | | | Stadium: Filbert Street; Attendance: 25,964 |

| 20 December 1958 22 | Nottingham Forest | 1–3 | Wolverhampton Wanderers | Nottingham |
| 14:15 GMT | Goal | | Broadbent; Horne; Mason | Stadium: City Ground; Attendance: 28,079 |

| 26 December 1958 23 | Portsmouth | 3–5 | Wolverhampton Wanderers | Portsmouth |
| 15:00 GMT | Goal | | Broadbent; Booth; Deeley | Stadium: Fratton Park; Attendance: 28,022 |

| 27 December 1958 24 | Wolverhampton Wanderers | 7–0 | Portsmouth | Wolverhampton |
| 15:00 GMT | Booth; Deeley; Horne | | | Stadium: Molineux; Attendance: 41,347 |

| 3 January 1959 25 | Wolverhampton Wanderers | 1–2 | Chelsea | Wolverhampton |
| 15:00 GMT | Deeley | | Tindall; Gibbs | Stadium: Molineux; Attendance: 36,093 |

| 31 January 1959 26 | Wolverhampton Wanderers | 5–0 | Blackburn Rovers | Wolverhampton |
| 15:00 GMT | Mason; Deeley; Lill; Murray | | | Stadium: Molineux; Attendance: 30,743 |

| 7 February 1959 27 | Newcastle United | 3–4 | Wolverhampton Wanderers | Newcastle upon Tyne |
| 15:00 GMT | Goal | | Lill; Mason; Murray | Stadium: St James' Park; Attendance: 42,377 |

| 14 February 1959 28 | Wolverhampton Wanderers | 6–2 | Leeds United | Wolverhampton |
| 15:00 GMT | Broadbent; Deeley; Murray | | Overfield; Shackleton | Stadium: Molineux; Attendance: 26,790 |

| 21 February 1959 29 | Manchester United | 2–1 | Wolverhampton Wanderers | Manchester |
| 15:00 GMT | Viollet; Charlton | | Mason | Stadium: Old Trafford; Attendance: 62,794 |

| 28 February 1959 30 | Manchester City | 1–4 | Wolverhampton Wanderers | Manchester |
| 15:00 GMT | Hayes | | Murray; Lill; Branaghan (o.g.)' | Stadium: Maine Road; Attendance: 42,776 |

| 2 March 1959 31 | Wolverhampton Wanderers | 1–1 | Tottenham Hotspur | Wolverhampton |
| 19:15 GMT | Lill | | Harmer | Stadium: Molineux; Attendance: 30,437 |

| 7 March 1959 32 | Wolverhampton Wanderers | 6–1 | Arsenal | Wolverhampton |
| 15:00 GMT | Broadbent; Deeley; Lill; Murray | | Haverty | Stadium: Molineux; Attendance: 40,480 |

| 14 March 1959 33 | Birmingham City | 0–3 | Wolverhampton Wanderers | Birmingham |
| 15:00 GMT | | | Murray; Broadbent | Stadium: St Andrew's; Attendance: 37,725 |

| 21 March 1959 34 | Wolverhampton Wanderers | 5–2 | West Bromwich Albion | Wolverhampton |
| 15:00 GMT | Lill; Deeley; Mason | | Goal | Stadium: Molineux; Attendance: 44,420 |

| 28 March 1959 35 | Preston North End | 1–2 | Wolverhampton Wanderers | Preston |
| 15:00 GMT | Goal | | Lill | Stadium: Deepdale; Attendance: 22,465 |

| 31 March 1959 36 | Leeds United | 1–3 | Wolverhampton Wanderers | Leeds |
| 15:00 GMT | Crowe | | Broadbent; Clamp; Murray | Stadium: Elland Road; Attendance: 35,819 |

| 4 April 1959 37 | Wolverhampton Wanderers | 3–3 | Burnley | Wolverhampton |
| 15:00 GMT | Broadbent; Clamp; Murray | | Goal | Stadium: Molineux; Attendance: 39,810 |

| 11 April 1959 38 | Bolton Wanderers | 2–2 | Wolverhampton Wanderers | Bolton |
| 15:00 GMT | Goal | | Booth; Murray | Stadium: Burnden Park; Attendance: 26,019 |

| 13 April 1959 39 | Blackpool | 0–1 | Wolverhampton Wanderers | Blackpool |
| 19:30 BST | | | Murray | Stadium: Bloomfield Road; Attendance: 22,328 |

| 18 April 1959 40 | Wolverhampton Wanderers | 5–0 | Luton Town | Wolverhampton |
| 15:00 BST | Broadbent; Booth; Clamp; Murray | | | Stadium: Molineux; Attendance: 40,981 |

| 22 April 1959 41 | Wolverhampton Wanderers | 3–0 | Leicester City | Wolverhampton |
| 19:15 BST | Deeley; Lill; Murray | | | Stadium: Molineux; Attendance: 41,220 |

| 25 April 1959 42 | Everton | 0–1 | Wolverhampton Wanderers | Liverpool |
| 15:15 BST | | | Murray | Stadium: Goodison Park; Attendance: 29,414 |

Final table

| Pos | Team | Pld | W | D | L | F | A | GA | Pts |
|---|---|---|---|---|---|---|---|---|---|
| 1 | Wolverhampton Wanderers | 42 | 28 | 5 | 9 | 110 | 49 | 2.245 | 61 |
| 2 | Manchester United | 42 | 24 | 7 | 11 | 103 | 66 | 1.561 | 55 |
| 3 | Arsenal | 42 | 21 | 8 | 13 | 88 | 68 | 1.294 | 50 |

Results by round

| Round | 1 | 2 | 3 | 4 | 5 | 6 | 7 | 8 | 9 | 10 | 11 | 12 | 13 | 14 | 15 | 16 | 17 | 18 | 19 | 20 | 21 | 22 | 23 | 24 | 25 | 26 | 27 | 28 | 29 | 30 | 31 | 32 | 33 | 34 | 35 | 36 | 37 | 38 | 39 | 40 | 41 | 42 |
|---|---|---|---|---|---|---|---|---|---|---|---|---|---|---|---|---|---|---|---|---|---|---|---|---|---|---|---|---|---|---|---|---|---|---|---|---|---|---|---|---|---|---|
| Result | W | L | L | D | W | W | W | W | L | L | W | W | D | W | L | W | W | L | W | W | L | W | W | W | L | W | W | W | L | W | D | W | W | W | W | W | D | D | W | W | W | W |
| Position | 3 | 8 | 13 | 13 | 11 | 9 | 4 | 2 | 7 | 9 | 5 | 4 | 3 | 2 | 5 | 3 | 2 | 3 | 3 | 2 | 4 | 2 | 1 | 1 | 1 | 2 | 1 | 1 | 1 | 2 | 1 | 1 | 1 | 1 | 1 | 1 | 1 | 1 | 1 | 1 | 1 | 1 |

W = Win; D = Draw; L = Loss

=== FA Cup ===
As a First Division team, Wolves entered the competition at the third round stage. The draw for this round was made on 8 December 1958.

| 10 January 1959 R3 | Barrow | 2–4 | Wolverhampton Wanderers | Barrow-in-Furness |
| 14:15 GMT | | | Deeley; Booth; Lill | Stadium: Holker Street; Attendance: 16,340 |

| 24 January 1959 R4 | Wolverhampton Wanderers | 1–2 | Bolton Wanderers | Wolverhampton |
| 15:00 GMT | Hennin o.g.' | | Parry pen.' Lofthouse | Stadium: Molineux; Attendance: 55,621 |

=== FA Charity Shield ===
| 6 October 1958 | Bolton Wanderers | 4–1 | Wolverhampton Wanderers | Bolton |
| 19:00 GMT | Hill 42'; Bannister 44'; Lofthouse 60', 70' | | Durandt 90' | Stadium: Burnden Park; Attendance: 36,029; Referee: Arthur Holland |

=== European Cup ===
In Wolves' first-ever competitive European tie they were drawn against West German champions Schalke 04 in the second round of the European Cup, having received a bye in the first round. Their appearance in the competition made them only the third English side at that time to ever play in a European competition.

| 12 November 1958 R2.1 | Wolverhampton Wanderers (England) | 2–2 | (Germany) Schalke 04 | Wolverhampton |
| 19:15 GMT | Broadbent 52', 65' | | Siebert 25'; Koslowski 88' | Stadium: Molineux; Attendance: 45,767; Referee: Albert Alsteen |

| 18 November 1958 R2.2 | Schalke 04 (Germany) | 2–1 (4–3 agg.) | (England) Wolverhampton Wanderers | Gelsenkirchen |
| | Kördell 12'; Siebert 35' | | Jackson 48' | Stadium: Glückauf-Kampfbahn; Attendance: 43,000; Referee: Gérard Versyp |

== Players ==
| Pos. | Nationality | Player | Football League | FA Cup | FA Charity Shield | European Cup | Total | Goal |
|---|---|---|---|---|---|---|---|---|
| GK | Scotland | Malcolm Finlayson | 39 | 2 | 1 | 0 | 42 | 0 |
| GK | England | Geoff Sidebottom | 3 | 0 | 0 | 1 | 4 | 0 |
| DF | England | Colin Booth | 13 | 2 | 0 | 0 | 15 | 8 |
| DF | England | Eddie Clamp | 26 | 0 | 1 | 1 | 28 | 3 |
| DF | England | Gerry Harris | 40 | 2 | 1 | 2 | 45 | 1 |
| DF | Wales | Gwyn Jones | 4 | 0 | 0 | 0 | 4 | 0 |
| DF | Ireland | Phil Kelly | 1 | 0 | 0 | 0 | 1 | 0 |
| DF | England | George Showell | 8 | 0 | 0 | 0 | 8 | 2 |
| DF | England | Bill Slater | 27 | 2 | 0 | 1 | 30 | 1 |
| DF | Union of South Africa | Eddie Stuart | 38 | 2 | 1 | 2 | 43 | 0 |
| DF | England | Billy Wright (Captain) | 39 | 2 | 1 | 2 | 44 | 0 |
| MF | England | Peter Broadbent | 40 | 2 | 0 | 2 | 44 | 22 |
| MF | England | Norman Deeley | 38 | 2 | 0 | 2 | 42 | 19 |
| MF | Union of South Africa | Cliff Durandt | 1 | 0 | 1 | 0 | 2 | 1 |
| MF | England | Ron Flowers | 31 | 2 | 1 | 2 | 36 | 0 |
| MF | Union of South Africa | Des Horne | 8 | 1 | 1 | 0 | 10 | 3 |
| MF | England | Mickey Lill | 18 | 1 | 0 | 0 | 19 | 13 |
| MF | England | Gerry Mannion | 0 | 0 | 1 | 0 | 1 | 0 |
| FW | Scotland | Jackie Henderson | 8 | 0 | 0 | 0 | 8 | 3 |
| FW | England | Alan Jackson | 2 | 0 | 0 | 2 | 4 | 2 |
| FW | England | Bobby Mason | 34 | 2 | 1 | 2 | 39 | 13 |
| FW | England | Jimmy Mullen | 16 | 0 | 0 | 2 | 18 | 4 |
| FW | England | Jimmy Murray | 28 | 0 | 1 | 0 | 29 | 21 |

=== Top scorer ===
| P. | Nationality | Player | Position | Football League | FA Cup | FA Charity Shield | European Cup | Total |
|---|---|---|---|---|---|---|---|---|
| 1 | England | Peter Broadbent | Inside forward | 20 | 0 | 0 | 2 | 22 |
| 2 | England | Jimmy Murray | Forward | 21 | 0 | 0 | 0 | 21 |
| 3 | England | Norman Deeley | Winger | 17 | 2 | 0 | 0 | 19 |
| 4 | England | Bobby Mason | Inside right | 13 | 0 | 0 | 0 | 13 |
| 4 | England | Mickey Lill | Winger | 12 | 1 | 0 | 0 | 13 |

=== Most appearances ===
| P. | Nationality | Player | Position | Football League | FA Cup | FA Charity Shield | European Cup | Total |
|---|---|---|---|---|---|---|---|---|
| 1 | England | Gerry Harris | Left back | 40 | 2 | 1 | 2 | 45 |
| 2 | England | Peter Broadbent | Inside forward | 40 | 2 | 0 | 2 | 44 |
| 2 | England | Billy Wright | Centre back | 39 | 2 | 1 | 2 | 44 |
| 4 | Scotland | Malcolm Finlayson | Goalkeeper | 39 | 2 | 1 | 1 | 43 |
| 4 | Union of South Africa | Eddie Stuart | Full back | 38 | 2 | 1 | 2 | 43 |

== Transfers ==
=== In ===
None

=== Out ===
| Date | Player | From |
|---|---|---|
| October 1958 | (Scotland) Jackie Henderson | Arsenal |
