= 1957–58 Wolverhampton Wanderers F.C. season =

English football club season

Wolverhampton Wanderers
1957–58 season
- Chairman: Jimmy Baker Jr
- Manager: Stan Cullis
- First Division: 1st (2nd title)
- FA Cup: Quarter-Final
- Top goalscorer: League: Jimmy Murray (29); All: Jimmy Murray (32)
- Highest home attendance: 55,778 (vs Darlington, 15 February 1958)
- Lowest home attendance: 26,033 (vs Aston Villa, 16 September 1957)
- Average home league attendance: 37,307 (league only)
Home colours

The 1957–58 season was the 59th season of competitive league football in the history of English football club Wolverhampton Wanderers. They played in the First Division, then the highest level of English football, for a 21st consecutive year.

The club won the League championship for a second time, four years after their first title, scoring over 100 goals in the process.

Wolves achieved the double over local rivals Aston Villa, part of a run of seven between 1957 and 1960.

== Results ==
=== Football League ===
A total of 22 teams competed in the First Division in the 1957–58 season. Each team would play every other team twice, once at their stadium, and once at the opposition's. Two points were awarded to teams for each win, one point per draw, and none for defeats.

24 August 1957 1	Everton	1–0	Wolverhampton Wanderers	Liverpool
15:15 BST	Harris			Stadium: Goodison Park; Attendance: 58,229

28 August 1957 2	Wolverhampton Wanderers	6–1	Bolton Wanderers	Wolverhampton
18:15 BST	Deeley; Murray; Booth; Broadbent		Lofthouse	Stadium: Molineux; Attendance: 30,790

31 August 1957 3	Wolverhampton Wanderers	5–0	Sunderland	Wolverhampton
15:00 BST	Murray; Booth; Deeley; Mullen			Stadium: Molineux; Attendance: 38,645

4 September 1957 4	Bolton Wanderers	1–1	Wolverhampton Wanderers	Bolton
18:30 BST			Deeley	Stadium: Burnden Park; Attendance: 22,938

7 September 1957 5	Luton Town	3–1	Wolverhampton Wanderers	Luton
15:00 BST			Wilshaw	Stadium: Kenilworth Road; Attendance: 21,998

14 September 1957 6	Wolverhampton Wanderers	3–1	Blackpool	Wolverhampton
15:00 BST	Broadbent; Mullen; Murray			Stadium: Molineux; Attendance: 38,496

16 September 1957 7	Wolverhampton Wanderers	2–1	Aston Villa	Wolverhampton
17:30 BST	Deeley; Murray			Stadium: Molineux; Attendance: 26,033

21 September 1957 8	Leicester City	2–3	Wolverhampton Wanderers	Leicester
15:00 BST			Murray; Clamp (pen.)'	Stadium: Filbert Street; Attendance: 35,388

23 September 1957 9	Aston Villa	2–3	Wolverhampton Wanderers	Birmingham
17:15 BST			Broadbent; Deeley; Murray	Stadium: Villa Park; Attendance: 21,336

28 September 1957 10	Wolverhampton Wanderers	3–1	Manchester United	Wolverhampton
15:00 BST	Deeley; Wilshaw		Doherty	Stadium: Molineux; Attendance: 48,825

2 October 1957 11	Wolverhampton Wanderers	4–0	Tottenham Hotspur	Wolverhampton
19:00 BST	Broadbent; Flowers; Murray			Stadium: Molineux; Attendance: 36,024

5 October 1957 12	Leeds United	1–1	Wolverhampton Wanderers	Leeds
15:00 BST	Baird		Deeley	Stadium: Elland Road; Attendance: 28,635

12 October 1957 13	Birmingham City	1–5	Wolverhampton Wanderers	Birmingham
15:00 GMT			Clamp (pen.)' (pen.)' Deeley; Murray; Wilshaw	Stadium: St Andrew's; Attendance: 43,005

19 October 1957 14	Wolverhampton Wanderers	2–1	Chelsea	Wolverhampton
15:00 GMT	Deeley; Wilshaw		Nicholas	Stadium: Molineux; Attendance: 37,524

26 October 1957 15	Newcastle United	1–1	Wolverhampton Wanderers	Newcastle upon Tyne
14:45 GMT			Deeley	Stadium: St James' Park; Attendance: 44,361

2 November 1957 16	Wolverhampton Wanderers	2–0	Nottingham Forest	Wolverhampton
15:00 GMT	Broadbent; Deeley			Stadium: Molineux; Attendance: 47,858

9 November 1957 17	Portsmouth	1–1	Wolverhampton Wanderers	Portsmouth
15:00 GMT			Clamp	Stadium: Fratton Park; Attendance: 38,320

16 November 1957 18	Wolverhampton Wanderers	1–1	West Bromwich Albion	Wolverhampton
15:00 GMT	Clamp (pen.)'		Kevan	Stadium: Molineux; Attendance: 55,418

23 November 1957 19	Manchester City	3–4	Wolverhampton Wanderers	Manchester
15:00 GMT	Barnes; McAdams		Murray; Broadbent; Mason	Stadium: Maine Road; Attendance: 45,121

30 November 1957 20	Wolverhampton Wanderers	2–1	Burnley	Wolverhampton
15:00 GMT	Broadbent; Murray			Stadium: Molineux; Attendance: 32,888

7 December 1957 21	Preston North End	1–2	Wolverhampton Wanderers	Preston
15:00 GMT			Lill; Murray	Stadium: Deepdale; Attendance: 22,741

14 December 1957 22	Wolverhampton Wanderers	4–3	Sheffield Wednesday	Wolverhampton
15:00 GMT	Broadbent; Mason; Murray; Clamp (pen.)'		Finney; Shiner; Wilkinson	Stadium: Molineux; Attendance: 28,082

21 December 1957 23	Wolverhampton Wanderers	2–0	Everton	Wolverhampton
15:00 GMT	Clamp; Mullen			Stadium: Molineux; Attendance: 29,447

26 December 1957 24	Tottenham Hotspur	1–0	Wolverhampton Wanderers	London
14:15 GMT	Smith			Stadium: White Hart Lane; Attendance: 58,393

28 December 1957 25	Sunderland	0–2	Wolverhampton Wanderers	Sunderland
14:45 GMT			Broadbent; Murray	Stadium: Roker Park; Attendance: 46,479

11 January 1958 26	Wolverhampton Wanderers	1–1	Luton Town	Wolverhampton
15:00 GMT	Mason			Stadium: Molineux; Attendance: 30,805

18 January 1958 27	Blackpool	3–2	Wolverhampton Wanderers	Blackpool
14:45 GMT			Deeley; Murray	Stadium: Bloomfield Road; Attendance: 17,983

1 February 1958 28	Wolverhampton Wanderers	5–1	Leicester City	Wolverhampton
15:00 GMT	Murray; Broadbent; Deeley; Mason		Walsh	Stadium: Molineux; Attendance: 36,400

19 February 1958 29	Wolverhampton Wanderers	3–2	Leeds United	Wolverhampton
19:00 GMT	Broadbent; Deeley; Mason		Peyton; Forrest	Stadium: Molineux; Attendance: 35,527

22 February 1958 30	Wolverhampton Wanderers	5–1	Birmingham City	Wolverhampton
15:00 GMT	Murray; Deeley			Stadium: Molineux; Attendance: 36,941

8 March 1958 31	Wolverhampton Wanderers	3–1	Newcastle United	Wolverhampton
15:00 GMT	Broadbent; Deeley; Mason		White	Stadium: Molineux; Attendance: 34,058

11 March 1958 32	Chelsea	1–2	Wolverhampton Wanderers	London
19:30 GMT	Greaves		Deeley; Showell	Stadium: Stamford Bridge; Attendance: 46,835

15 March 1958 33	Nottingham Forest	1–4	Wolverhampton Wanderers	Nottingham
15:00 GMT	Baily		Broadbent; Murray	Stadium: City Ground; Attendance: 40,407

22 March 1958 34	Wolverhampton Wanderers	3–3	Manchester City	Wolverhampton
15:00 GMT	Deeley; Mullen; Ewing (o.g.)'		Barlow (o.g.)'	Stadium: Molineux; Attendance: 34,932

29 March 1958 35	West Bromwich Albion	0–3	Wolverhampton Wanderers	West Bromwich
15:00 GMT			Murray; Mason	Stadium: The Hawthorns; Attendance: 56,904

5 April 1958 36	Wolverhampton Wanderers	1–0	Portsmouth	Wolverhampton
15:00 GMT	Clamp (pen.)'			Stadium: Molineux; Attendance: 31,259

7 April 1958 37	Arsenal	0–2	Wolverhampton Wanderers	London
15:00 GMT			Broadbent; Murray	Stadium: Highbury; Attendance: 51,318

8 April 1958 38	Wolverhampton Wanderers	1–2	Arsenal	Wolverhampton
15:00 GMT	Broadbent		Groves; Wills	Stadium: Molineux; Attendance: 47,501

12 April 1958 39	Burnley	1–1	Wolverhampton Wanderers	Burnley
15:00 GMT			Clamp (pen.)'	Stadium: Turf Moor; Attendance: 28,539

19 April 1958 40	Wolverhampton Wanderers	2–0	Preston North End	Wolverhampton
15:00 BST	Deeley; Milne (o.g.)'			Stadium: Molineux; Attendance: 46,001

21 April 1958 41	Manchester United	0–4	Wolverhampton Wanderers	Manchester
19:00 BST			Broadbent; Clamp; Deeley; Flowers	Stadium: Old Trafford; Attendance: 33,267

26 April 1958 42	Sheffield Wednesday	2–1	Wolverhampton Wanderers	Sheffield
15:00 BST	Shiner; Wilkinson		Flowers	Stadium: Hillsborough; Attendance: 25,254

Final table

Pos	Team	Pld	W	D	L	F	A	GA	Pts
1	Wolverhampton Wanderers	42	28	8	6	103	47	2.191	64
2	Preston North End	42	26	7	9	100	51	1.961	59
3	Tottenham Hotspur	42	21	9	12	93	77	1.208	51

Results by round

Round	1	2	3	4	5	6	7	8	9	10	11	12	13	14	15	16	17	18	19	20	21	22	23	24	25	26	27	28	29	30	31	32	33	34	35	36	37	38	39	40	41	42
Result	L	W	W	D	L	W	W	W	W	W	W	D	W	W	D	W	D	D	W	W	W	W	W	L	W	D	L	W	W	W	W	W	W	D	W	W	W	L	D	W	W	L
Position	18	9	4	5	8	10	5	5	3	2	1	1	1	1	1	1	1	1	1	1	1	1	1	1	1	1	1	1	1	1	1	1	1	1	1	1	1	1	1	1	1	1

W = Win; D = Draw; L = Loss

=== FA Cup ===
4 January 1958 R3	Lincoln City	0–1	Wolverhampton Wanderers	Lincoln
14:15 GMT			Mullen	Stadium: Sincil Bank; Attendance: 21,741

25 January 1958 R4	Wolverhampton Wanderers	5–1	Portsmouth	Wolverhampton
15:00 GMT	Broadbent; Mason; Mullen; Rutter o.g.'		Crawford	Stadium: Molineux; Attendance: 43,522

15 February 1958 R5	Wolverhampton Wanderers	6–1	Darlington	Wolverhampton
15:00 GMT	Murray; Broadbent; Mason		Bell	Stadium: Molineux; Attendance: 55,778

1 March 1958 QF	Bolton Wanderers	2–1	Wolverhampton Wanderers	Bolton
15:00 GMT	Stevens; Parry		Mason	Stadium: Burnden Park; Attendance: 56,306; Referee: A. Holland (Barnsley)

== Players Used ==
Pos.	Nationality	Player	Football League	FA Cup	Total	Goal
1	Scotland	Malcolm Finlayson	28	4	32	0
2	South Africa	Eddie Stuart	40	4	44	0
3	England	Gerry Harris	39	4	43	0
4	England	Eddie Clamp	41	4	45	10
5	England	Billy Wright (Captain)	38	4	42	0
6	England	Ron Flowers	28	1	29	3
7	England	Norman Deeley	41	4	45	23
8	England	Colin Booth	13	0	13	2
9	England	Jimmy Murray	41	4	45	32
10	England	Peter Broadbent	40	4	44	21
11	England	Jimmy Mullen	38	4	42	6
12	[[|]]	[[ ]]			0
13	[[|]]	[[ ]]			0
14	[[|]]	[[ ]]			0
15	[[|]]	[[ ]]			0
16	[[|]]	[[ ]]			0
17	[[|]]	[[ ]]			0
18	[[|]]	[[ ]]			0
19	[[|]]	[[ ]]			0
20	[[|]]	[[ ]]			0
21	[[|]]	[[ ]]			0

Eddie Clamp 41 4 45 Norman Deeley 41 4 45 Jimmy Murray 41 4 45 Peter Broadbent 40 4 44 Eddie Stuart 40 4 44 Gerry Harris 39 4 43 Jimmy Mullen 38 4 42 Billy Wright 38 4 42 Malcolm Finlayson 28 4 32 Ron Flowers 28 1 29 Bobby Mason 20 4 24 Bill Slater 14 3 17 Colin Booth 13 0 13 Dennis Wilshaw 12 0 12 George Showell 7 0 7 Noel Dwyer 5 0 5 Ron Howells 2 0 2 Alan Jackson 2 0 2 Gwyn Jones 2 0 2 Jackie Henderson 1 0 1 Micky Lill 1 0 1

=== Top scorer ===
P.	Nationality	Player	Position	Football League	FA Cup	Total
1	England	Jimmy Murray		29	3	32
2	England	Norman Deeley		23	0	23
3	England	Peter Broadbent		17	4	21
4	England	Eddie Clamp		10	0	10
5	England	Bobby Mason		7	3	10

=== Most appearances ===
P.	Nationality	Player	Position	Football League	FA Cup	Total
1	England	Eddie Clamp		41	4	45
2	England	Norman Deeley		41	4	45
3	England	Jimmy Murray		41	4	45
4	England	Peter Broadbent		40	4	44
5	South Africa	Eddie Stuart		40	4	44

== Transfers ==
=== In ===
Date	Player	From
March 1958	(Scotland) Jackie Henderson	Portsmouth

=== Out ===
Date	Player	To
December 1957	(England) Dennis Wilshaw	Stoke City
