= List of Wolverhampton Wanderers F.C. records and statistics =

Wolverhampton Wanderers Football Club is an English football club based in Wolverhampton. The club was founded as St Luke's in 1877, soon becoming Wolverhampton Wanderers, before being a founder member of the Football League in 1888. Since that time, the club has played in all four professional divisions of the English football pyramid, and been champions of all these levels. They have also been involved in European football, having been one of the first English clubs to enter the European Cup, as well as reaching the final of the first staging of the UEFA Cup.

This list encompasses all honours won by Wolverhampton Wanderers and records set by the club, their managers and their players. The player records section includes details of the club's leading goalscorers and those who have made most appearances in first-team competitions, as well as transfer fee records paid and received by the club. A list of streaks recording all elements of the game (wins, losses, clean sheets, etc.) is also presented.

== Honours ==
In the all-time top flight league table since the league's inception in 1888, Wolves sit in the top fifteen, in terms of all-time English first level league position.

Alternatively, they sit in the top four, behind only Manchester United, Liverpool and Arsenal in terms of all-time league position from points gained at any level of English professional football.

Cumulatively, they are the joint 11th most successful club in domestic English football history, tied with Nottingham Forest. One place behind Blackburn Rovers, with nine major trophy wins, not including super cups. Alternatively they are joint 10th with Nottingham Forest, in competitive honours with 13 trophy wins, behind Newcastle United.(see here).

Uniquely, they are the only club to have won titles in five different Football League divisions, and, in 1988, became the first team to have been champions of all four professional leagues in English football; although this feat has since been matched by Burnley (in 1992) and Preston (in 1996). They remain the only club to have won all the main domestic cup competitions (FA Cup, League Cup and EFL Trophy) currently contested in English football.

=== League ===
First Division/Premier League

- Champions: 1953–54, 1957–58, 1958–59
- Runners-up: 1937–38, 1938–39, 1949–50, 1954–55, 1959–60

Second Division/Championship

- Champions: 1931–32, 1976–77, 2008–09, 2017–18
- Runners-up: 1966–67, 1982–83
- Play-off winners: 2003

Third Division/League One

- Champions: 1923–24 (North), 1988–89, 2013–14

Fourth Division

- Champions: 1987–88

=== Cup ===
UEFA Cup

- Runners-up: 1972

FA Cup

- Winners: 1893, 1908, 1949, 1960
- Runners-up: 1889, 1896, 1921, 1939

EFL Cup

- Winners: 1974, 1980

FA Charity Shield

- Winners: 1949*, 1954*, 1959, 1960* (* joint holders)
- Runners-up: 1958

EFL Trophy

- Winners: 1988

Texaco Cup

- Winners: 1971

=== Minor honours ===
Premier League Asia Trophy

- Winners: 2019

Uhrencup

- Winners: 2018

Football League War Cup

- Winners: 1942

FA Youth Cup

- Winners: 1958
- Runners-up: 1953, 1954, 1962, 1976

United Soccer Association

- Champions 1967 – playing as Los Angeles Wolves

NASL International Cup

- Winners 1969 – playing as Kansas City Spurs

Premier League 2 Division 2

- Winners 2018-19

The Central League

- Winners 1931–32, 1950–51, 1951–52, 1952–53, 1957–58, 1958–59

Birmingham Senior Cup

- Winners 1891–92, 1892–93, 1893–94, 1899–1900, 1901–02, 1923–24, 1986–87
- Runners-up 1888–89, 1896–97, 1897–98, 1903–04, 1906–07, 1908–09, 1912–13, 1998–99, 2003–04, 2016–17

Birmingham Football Combination

- Winners 1934–35

Birmingham & District League

- Winners 1892–93, 1897–98, 1898–99, 1900–01, 1953–54, 1957–58, 1958–59

Worcestershire Football Combination

- Winners 1957–58

Staffordshire Senior Cup

- Winners 1887–88, 1893–94, 1966–67
- Runners Up 1884–85

Shropshire Senior Cup

- Winners 2001

Walsall Senior Cup

- Runners Up 1885–86

Wrekin Cup

- Winners 1884 (First ever trophy)

Daily Express National Five-a-Sides

- Winners 1975, 1976

Gothia Cup

- Winners 2009

== Players ==
=== Appearances ===
Most appearances

Note: Competitive first-team games only; substitute appearances are included in total.

Rank	Player	Years	League	FA Cup	League Cup	Other^{[C]}	Total
1	(England) Derek Parkin	1968–1982	501	46	35	27	609
2	(England) Kenny Hibbitt	1968–1984	466	47	36	25	574
3	(England) Steve Bull	1986–1999	474	20	33	34	561
4	(England) Billy Wright	1939–1959	490	48	0	3	541
5	(England) Ron Flowers	1952–1967	467	31	0	14	512
6	(England) John McAlle	1967–1981	406	44	27	31	508
7	(England) Peter Broadbent	1951–1965	452	31	0	14	497
8	(England) Geoff Palmer	1971–1984	416	38	33	8	495
9	(England) Jimmy Mullen	1937–1960	445	38	0	3	486
9	(England) John Richards	1969–1983	385	44	33	24	486

- Most League appearances: 501 – Derek Parkin (1968–1982)
- Most FA Cup appearances: 48 – Harry Wood (1885–1898) and Billy Wright (1939–1959)
- Most League Cup appearances: 36 – Kenny Hibbitt (1968–1984)
- Most European appearances: 18 – Derek Dougan (1967–1975)
- Most consecutive appearances: 171 – Phil Parkes (127 league), September 1970 to September 1973
- Youngest player: Jimmy Mullen, 16 years 43 days (vs Leeds United, 18 February 1939)
- Oldest player: Archie Goodall, 41 years 116 days (vs Everton, Division 1; 2 December 1905)

=== Goalscorers ===
Highest goalscorers

Note: Goals scored in competitive first-team games only

Rank	Player	Years	League	FA Cup	League Cup	Europe	Other^{[C]}	Total
1	(England) Steve Bull	1986–1999	250	7	18	0	31	306
2	(England) John Richards	1969–1983	144	24	18	4	4	194
3	(England) Billy Hartill	1928–1935	162	8	0	0	0	170
4	(England) Johnny Hancocks	1946–1957	157	8	0	0	2	167
5	(England) Jimmy Murray	1955–1963	155	7	0	2	2	166
6	(England) Peter Broadbent	1951–1965	127	10	0	7	1	145
7	(England) Harry Wood	1887–1898	110	16	0	0	0	126
8	(England) Dennis Westcott	1937–1948	105	19	0	0	0	124
9	(Northern Ireland) Derek Dougan	1967–1975	95	4	7	12	5	123
10	(England) Roy Swinbourne	1945–1957	107	5	0	0	2	114

- Most goals in a season in all competitions: 52 – Steve Bull (1987–88, Division 4)
- Most League goals in a season: 38 – Dennis Westcott (1946–47, Division 1)
- Most top flight goals scored: 158 – Johnny Hancocks (1946–57)
- Most Premier League goals scored: 36 – Raúl Jiménez (as of 3 November 2021)
- Most goals in European competition: 12 – Derek Dougan (1967–75)
- Most hat-tricks scored: 18 – Steve Bull (1986–99)
- Most goals scored in a match: 5
  - Joe Butcher vs Accrington, 19 November 1892 (Division 1)
  - Tom Phillipson vs Bradford City, 25 December 1926 (Division 2)
  - Billy Hartill vs Notts County, 12 October 1929 (Division 2)
  - Billy Hartill vs Aston Villa, 3 September 1934 (Division 1)
- Fastest recorded goal: 15 seconds – John Richards vs Burnley, 15 November 1975

=== Internationals ===
- First international: Charlie Mason for England vs Ireland, 17 March 1884
- Most international caps received whilst signed to Wolves: Billy Wright – 105 for England (1939–59)
- Most international goals scored whilst signed to Wolves: 10 – Ron Flowers and Dennis Wilshaw (both England)
- Most World Cup Finals appearances whilst signed to Wolves: 10 – Billy Wright (England, 1950–58)

=== Award winners ===
Football Writers' Footballer of the Year

- (England) Billy Wright – 1952
- (England) Bill Slater – 1960

=== Transfers ===
==== Record paid ====
No.	Name	Fee	Paid to	Date	Ref.
1	(Brazil) Matheus Cunha	£44,000,000	(Spain) Atlético Madrid	1 September 2023	
2	(Portugal) Matheus Nunes	£38,000,000	(Portugal) Sporting CP	17 August 2022	
3	(Portugal) Fábio Silva	£35,000,000	(Portugal) Porto	5 September 2020	
4	(Mexico) Raúl Jiménez	£32,000,000	(Portugal) Benfica	1 July 2019	
5	(Portugal) Gonçalo Guedes	£27,500,000	(Spain) Valencia	8 August 2022	

Progression of record fee paid

Date	Player	Bought from	Fee
September 1963	(England) Ray Crawford	Ipswich Town	£55,000
February 1968	(England) Derek Parkin	Huddersfield Town	£80,000
July 1972	(England) Steve Kindon	Burnley	£100,000
September 1977	(England) Paul Bradshaw	Blackburn Rovers	£150,000
September 1979	(Scotland) Andy Gray	Aston Villa	£1,500,000
March 1995	(England) Dean Richards	Bradford City	£1,850,000
September 1999	(Nigeria) Ade Akinbiyi	Bristol City	£3,500,000
June 2009	(Republic of Ireland) Kevin Doyle	Reading	£6,500,000
June 2010	(Scotland) Steven Fletcher	Burnley	£6,500,000
August 2016	(Portugal) Ivan Cavaleiro	(France) Monaco	£7,000,000
January 2017	(Angola) Hélder Costa	(Portugal) Benfica	£13,000,000
July 2017	(Portugal) Rúben Neves	(Portugal) Porto	£15,800,000
August 2018	(Spain) Adama Traoré	Middlesbrough	£18,000,000
July 2019	(Mexico) Raúl Jiménez	(Portugal) Benfica	£32,000,000
September 2020	(Portugal) Fábio Silva	(Portugal) Porto	£35,000,000
August 2022	(Portugal) Matheus Nunes	(Portugal) Sporting CP	£38,000,000
August 2022	(Brazil) Matheus Cunha	(Spain) Atlético Madrid	£44,000,000

==== Record received ====
No.	Name	Fee	Paid by	Date	Ref.
1	(Portugal) Pedro Neto	£54,000,000	(England) Chelsea	11 August 2024	
2	(Portugal) Matheus Nunes	£53,000,000	(England) Manchester City	1 September 2023	
3	(Portugal) Rúben Neves	£47,000,000	(Saudi Arabia) Al-Hilal	1 July 2023	
4	(Portugal) Diogo Jota	£41,000,000	(England) Liverpool	19 September 2020	
5	(England) Max Kilman	£40,000,000	(England) West Ham United	6 July 2024	

Progression of record fee received

Date	Player	Sold to	Fee
November 1961	(England) Eddie Clamp	Arsenal	£45,000
September 1967	(England) Ernie Hunt	Everton	£81,000
March 1974	(Scotland) Jim McCalliog	Manchester United	£81,000
March 1975	(England) Peter Eastoe	Swindon Town	£88,000
November 1977	(England) Alan Sunderland	Arsenal	£248,000
September 1979	(England) Steve Daley	Manchester City	£1,440,000
July 1997	(England) Neil Emblen	Crystal Palace	£2,250,000
August 1999	(Republic of Ireland) Robbie Keane	Coventry City	£8,100,000
August 2012	(England) Matt Jarvis	West Ham United	£10,750,000
August 2012	(Scotland) Steven Fletcher	Sunderland	£14,000,000
July 2020	(Portugal) Hélder Costa	Leeds United	£15,600,000
September 2020	(Portugal) Diogo Jota	Liverpool	£41,000,000
July 2023	(Portugal) Rúben Neves	(Saudi Arabia) Al-Hilal	£47,000,000
September 2023	(Portugal) Matheus Nunes	Manchester City	£53,000,000

== Managers ==
- Longest-serving manager: Jack Addenbrooke – 36 years, 10 months
- Shortest-serving manager: Bill McGarry (second spell) – 61 days
- Youngest manager when appointed: Jack Addenbrooke – 20 years old
- Oldest manager when appointed: Bill McGarry (second spell) – 58 years old

== Team records ==
=== Matches ===
Firsts

- First known match: St Luke's 0–8 Stafford Road, 13 January 1877
- First FA Cup match: Wolves 4–1 Long Eaton Rangers, 1st round, 27 October 1883
- First Football League match: Wolves 1–1 Aston Villa, 8 September 1888
- First match at Molineux: Wolves 1–0 Aston Villa, friendly, 2 September 1889
- First European match: Wolves 2–2 Schalke, European Cup 2nd round 1st leg, 12 November 1958
- First League Cup match: Wolves 2–1 Mansfield Town, 2nd round, 13 September 1966

Record wins

- Record win: 14–0 vs Crosswell's Brewery, FA Cup 2nd round, 13 November 1886
- Record League win: 10–1 vs Leicester City, Division 1, 15 April 1938
- Record FA Cup win: 14–0 vs Crosswell's Brewery, FA Cup 2nd round, 13 November 1886
- Record League Cup win: 6–1 vs Shrewsbury Town, 2nd round 1st leg, 24 September 1991
- Record European win: 5–0 vs Austria Vienna, European Cup Winners' Cup quarter-final 2nd leg, 30 November 1960
- Record home win (league): 10–1 vs Leicester City, Division 1, 15 April 1938
- Record home win (cup): 14–0 vs Crosswell's Brewery, FA Cup 2nd round, 13 November 1886
- Record away win (league): 9–1 vs Cardiff City, Division 1, 3 September 1955
- Record away win (cup): 5–0 vs Grimsby Town, FA Cup semi-final, 25 March 1939 (neutral venue)

Record defeats

- Record defeat: 1–10 vs Newton Heath, Division 1, 15 October 1892
- Record League defeat: 1–10 vs Newton Heath, Division 1, 15 October 1892
- Record FA Cup defeat: 0–6 vs Rotherham United, 1st round, 16 November 1985
- Record League Cup defeat: 0–6 vs Chelsea, 3rd round, 25 September 2012
- Record European defeat: 0–4 vs Barcelona, European Cup 2nd round first leg, 10 February 1960
- Record home defeat (league): 0–8 vs West Bromwich Albion, Division 1, 27 December 1897
- Record home defeat (cup): 3–6 vs Derby County, FA Cup 3rd round, 14 January 1933
- Record away defeat (league): 1–10 vs Newton Heath, Division 1, 15 October 1892
- Record away defeat (cup): 0–6 vs Rotherham United, FA Cup 1st round, 16 November 1985; and vs Chelsea, League Cup 3rd round, 25 September 2012

Streaks

Note: Applies to League games only

- Longest run of consecutive full seasons playing in Tier 1 of English football: 26 (1932 – 1965) [n.b. 1939–40 season was abandoned due to outbreak of World War II and there was no full league football between 1940 and 1946 due to the conflict]
- Longest run of consecutive full seasons playing in Tier 2 of English football: 14 (1989 – 2003)
- Longest unbeaten run: 21 games (January – August 2005)
- Longest unbeaten run in home games: 27 games (March 1923 – September 1924)
- Longest unbeaten run in away games: 11 games (September 1953 – January 1954)
- Longest winning run: 9 games (January – March 2014)
- Longest winning run in home games: 14 games (March – December 1953)
- Longest winning run in away games: 5 games (during 1938, 1962, 1980, 2001, 2013)
- Longest winless run: 19 games (December 1984 – April 1985)
- Longest winless run in home games: 13 games (November 1984 – May 1985)
- Longest winless run in away games: 32 games (March 1922 – October 1923)
- Longest scoring run: 41 games (December 1958 – December 1959)
- Longest scoreless run: 7 games (February – March 1985)
- Longest run of clean sheets: 8 games (August – October 1982)
- Longest run without a clean sheet: 30 games (September 2011 – April 2012)

=== Goals ===
- Most league goals scored in a season: 115 (Division 2; 1931–32)
- Fewest league goals scored in a season: 27 (Division 1; 1983–84)
- Most league goals conceded in a season: 99 (Division 1; 1905–06)
- Fewest league goals conceded in a season: 27 (Division 3; 1923–24)
- Most goals scored in a game (league): 10 (vs Leicester City, Division 1, 15 April 1938)
- Most goals scored in a game (cup): 14 (vs Crosswell's Brewery, FA Cup 2nd round, 13 November 1886)

=== Points ===
- Most points in a season:
  - Two points for a win: 64 (Division 1, 1957–58)
  - Three points for a win: 103 (League One, 2013–14)
- Fewest points in a season:
  - Two points for a win: 21 (Division 1, 1895–96)
  - Three points for a win: 20 (Premier League, 2025-26)

=== Attendances ===
- Highest home attendance: 61,315 vs Liverpool, FA Cup 4th Round, 11 February 1939
- Highest league attendance: 58,661 vs West Bromwich Albion, Division 1, 15 October 1949
- Highest average league attendance: 45,346 (1949–50 season)

== Miscellaneous feats ==
- Wolves were awarded, and scored from, the Football League's first ever penalty kick on 14 September 1891.
- Wolves were the first (and as of 2014 only) English league team to pass the 100-goal mark for four seasons in succession, in the 1957–58, 1958–59, 1959–60 and 1960–61 seasons.
- In 2005 Wolves became the first team to have scored 7,000 league goals and currently trail only Manchester United and Liverpool in terms of total league goals (as of the end of the 2016–17 season).
