= 1959–60 Wolverhampton Wanderers F.C. season =

English football club season

Wolverhampton Wanderers
1959–60 season
- Manager: Stan Cullis
- First Division: 2nd
- FA Cup: Winners
- FA Charity Shield: Winners
- European Cup: Quarter-Finals
- Top goalscorer: League: Jimmy Murray (29); All: Jimmy Murray (34)
- Highest home attendance: 56,283 (vs Tottenham Hotspur, 23 April 1960)
- Lowest home attendance: 21,546 (vs Leeds United, 14 November 1959)
- Average home league attendance: 36,201 (league), 38,350 (all competitions)
Home colours

The 1959–60 season was the 61st season of competitive league football in the history of English football club Wolverhampton Wanderers. They played in the First Division, then the highest level of English football.

The club were narrowly denied a third consecutive league title after Burnley finished one point ahead of them. They did however win both the FA Cup (for a fourth and final time) as well as the FA Charity Shield and also reach the quarter-final stage of the European Cup.

== Results ==
=== Football League First Division ===
Final table

Pos	Club	Pld	W	D	L	F	A	GA	Pts
1	Burnley	42	24	7	11	85	61	1.393	55
2	Wolverhampton Wanderers	42	24	6	12	106	67	1.582	54
3	Tottenham Hotspur	42	21	11	10	86	50	1.720	53

Pld = Matches played; W = Matches won; D = Matches drawn; L = Matches lost; F = Goals for; A = Goals against; GA = Goal average; Pts = Points

=== First Division ===
Date	Opponent	Venue	Result	Attendance	Scorers
22 August 1959	Birmingham City	St Andrews	W 1–0	41,260	
26 August 1959	Sheffield Wednesday	Molineux	W 3–1	37,397	
29 August 1959	Arsenal	Molineux	D 3-3	45,885	
2 September 1959	Sheffield Wednesday	Hillsborough	D 2-2	45,145	
5 September 1959	Manchester City	Maine Road	W 6–4	43,650	
9 September 1959	Fulham	Craven Cottage	L 1–3	32,447	
12 September 1959	Blackburn Rovers	Molineux	W 3–1	39,001	
16 September 1959	Fulham	Molineux	W 9–0	41,692	
19 September 1959	Blackpool	Bloomfield Road	L 1–3	35,303	
26 September 1959	Everton	Molineux	W 2–0	35,230	
3 October 1959	Luton Town	Kenilworth Road	W 5–1	22,908	
10 October 1959	Tottenham Hotspur	White Hart Lane	L 1–5	59,344	
17 October 1959	Manchester United	Molineux	W 3–2	45,451	
24 October 1959	Preston North End	Deepdale	L 3–4	22,612	
31 October 1959	Newcastle United	Molineux	W 2–0	33,999	
7 November 1959	Burnley	Turf Moor	L 1–4	27,793	
14 November 1959	Leeds United	Molineux	W 4–2	21,546	
21 November 1959	West Ham United	Boleyn Ground	L 2–3	38,000	
28 November 1959	Chelsea	Molineux	W 3–1	32,894	
5 December 1959	West Bromwich Albion	The Hawthorns	W 1–0	48,759	
12 December 1959	Leicester City	Molineux	L 0–3	25,370	
19 December 1959	Birmingham City	Molineux	W 2–0	22,363	
26 December 1959	Bolton Wanderers	Burnden Park	L 1–2	36,039	
28 December 1959	Bolton Wanderers	Molineux	L 0–1	28,424	
2 January 1960	Arsenal	Highbury	D 2-2	47,854	
16 January 1960	Manchester City	Molineux	W 4–2	27,864	
23 January 1960	Blackburn Rovers	Ewood Park	W 1–0	30,200	
6 February 1960	Blackpool	Molineux	D 1-1	36,347	
13 February 1960	Everton	Goodison Park	W 2–0	51,135	
23 February 1960	Luton Town	Molineux	W 3–2	30,059	
27 February 1960	West Bromwich Albion	Molineux	W 3–1	49,791	
5 March 1960	Manchester United	Old Trafford	W 2–0	60,560	
16 March 1960	Preston North End	Molineux	D 3-3	28,760	
19 March 1960	Leicester City	Filbert Street	L 1–2	25,660	
30 March 1960	Burnley	Molineux	W 6–1	33,953	
2 April 1960	Leeds United	Elland Road	W 3–0	29,492	
11 April 1960	West Ham United	Molineux	W 5–0	48,086	
16 April 1960	Newcastle United	St James Park	L 0–1	47,409	
18 April 1960	Nottingham Forest	Molineux	W 3–1	39,834	
19 April 1960	Nottingham Forest	City Ground	D 0-0	42,185	
23 April 1960	Tottenham Hotspur	Molineux	L 1–3	56,283	
30 April 1960	Chelsea	Stamford Bridge	W 5–1	61,597	

=== FA Cup ===
9 January 1960 R3	Newcastle United	2–2	Wolverhampton Wanderers	Newcastle upon Tyne
				Stadium: St James' Park; Attendance: 62,443

13 January 1960 R3 rep.	Wolverhampton Wanderers	4–2	Newcastle United	Wolverhampton
				Stadium: Molineux; Attendance: 39,082

30 January 1960 R4	Wolverhampton Wanderers	2–1	Charlton Athletic	Wolverhampton
				Stadium: Molineux; Attendance: 37,026

20 February 1960 R5	Luton Town	1–4	Wolverhampton Wanderers	Luton
				Stadium: Kenilworth Road; Attendance: 25,714

12 March 1960 QF	Leicester City	1–2	Wolverhampton Wanderers	Leicester
				Stadium: Filbert Street; Attendance: 40,907

26 March 1960 SF	Aston Villa	0–1	Wolverhampton Wanderers	West Bromwich
				Stadium: The Hawthorns; Attendance: 55,596

7 May 1960 Final	Blackburn Rovers	0–3	Wolverhampton Wanderers	London
15:00 BST			McGrath 41' (o.g.); Deeley 67', 88'	Stadium: Wembley Stadium; Attendance: 98,776

=== FA Charity Shield ===
15 August 1958	Wolverhampton Wanderers	3–1	Nottingham Forest	Wolverhampton
	Broadbent; Lill; Murray		Wilson	Stadium: Molineux; Attendance: 32,329

=== European Cup ===
20 September 1959 Prel.1	Vorwärts Berlin (East Germany)	2–1	(England) Wolverhampton Wanderers	East Berlin, East Germany
	Nöldner 24'; Kohle 29'		Broadbent 15'	Stadium: Walter Ulbricht Stadium; Attendance: 65,000

7 October 1959 Prel.2	Wolverhampton Wanderers (England)	2–0 (3–2 agg.)	(East Germany) Vorwärts Berlin	Wolverhampton
	Mason 60'; Broadbent 75'			Stadium: Molineux; Attendance: 55,747

11 November 1959 Rdof16.1	Red Star Belgrade (Socialist Federal Republic of Yugoslavia)	1–1	(England) Wolverhampton Wanderers	Belgrade, Yugoslavia
	Kostić 37'		Deeley 29'	Stadium: Partizan Stadium; Attendance: 62,000

24 November 1959 Rdof16.2	Wolverhampton Wanderers (England)	3–0 (4–1 agg.)	(Socialist Federal Republic of Yugoslavia) Red Star Belgrade	Wolverhampton
	Murray 8'; Mason 85', 89'			Stadium: Molineux; Attendance: 55,519

10 February 1960 QF.1	Barcelona (Spain)	4–0	(England) Wolverhampton Wanderers	Barcelona, Spain
	Villaverde 8', 80'; Kubala 16'; Evaristo 65'			Stadium: Nou Camp; Attendance: 80,000

2 March 1960 QF.2	Wolverhampton Wanderers (England)	2–5 (2–9 agg.)	(Spain) Barcelona	Wolverhampton
	Murray 35'; Mason 78'		Martínez 29'; Kocsis 44', 49', 74'; Villaverde 85'	Stadium: Molineux; Attendance: 55,535

== Players Used ==
Pos.	Nationality	Player	Football League	FA Cup	FA Charity Shield	European Cup	Total	Goal
1	Scotland	Malcolm Finlayson					0
2	South Africa	Eddie Stuart					0
3	Wales	Gwyn Jones					0
4	England	Eddie Clamp					0
5	England	George Showell					0
6	England	Ron Flowers					0
7	England	Mickey Lill					0
8	England	Bobby Mason					0
9	England	Jimmy Murray					0
10	England	Peter Broadbent					0
11	England	Norman Deeley					0
12	[[|]]	[[ ]]					0
13	[[|]]	[[ ]]					0
14	[[|]]	[[ ]]					0
15	[[|]]	[[ ]]					0
16	[[|]]	[[ ]]					0
17	[[|]]	[[ ]]					0
18	[[|]]	[[ ]]					0
19	[[|]]	[[ ]]					0
20	[[|]]	[[ ]]					0
21	[[|]]	[[ ]]					0
22	[[|]]	[[ ]]					0

=== Top scorer ===
P.	Nationality	Player	Position	Football League	FA Cup	FA Charity Shield	European Cup	Total
1	[[|]]
2	[[|]]
3	[[|]]
4	[[|]]
5	[[|]]

=== Most appearances ===
P.	Nationality	Player	Position	Football League	FA Cup	FA Charity Shield	European Cup	Total
1	[[|]]
2	[[|]]
3	[[|]]
4	[[|]]
5	[[|]]
