= 1958 FA Charity Shield =

- Event: FA Charity Shield
Bolton Wanderers	Wolverhampton Wanderers
4	1
- Date: 6 October 1958
- Venue: Burnden Park, Bolton
- Referee: Arthur Holland (Barnsley)
- Attendance: 36,029

The 1958 FA Charity Shield was the 36th FA Charity Shield, a football match between the winners of the previous season's First Division and FA Cup titles. This year's match was contested by league champions Wolverhampton Wanderers and FA Cup winners Bolton Wanderers.

The match was staged at Bolton's home ground, Burnden Park. The hosts won the game 4–1, giving them their only Shield win.

== Match details ==
6 October 1958
19:00 GMT

Bolton Wanderers	4–1	Wolverhampton Wanderers
Hill 42'; Bannister 44'; Lofthouse 60', 70'		Durandt 90'

Burnden Park, Bolton
Attendance: 36,029
Referee: Arthur Holland (Barnsley)

Bolton Wanderers	Wolverhampton Wanderers

1	(England) Joe Dean
2	(England) Roy Hartle
3	(England) Gordon Edwards
4	(England) Derek Hennin
5	(England) John Higgins
6	(Wales) Malcolm Edwards
7	(England) Neville Bannister
8	(England) Dennis Stevens
9	(England) Nat Lofthouse (c)
10	(England) Fred Hill
11	(England) Doug Holden
Manager:
(England) Bill Ridding

1	(Scotland) Malcolm Finlayson
2	(Union of South Africa) Eddie Stuart
3	(England) Gerry Harris
4	(England) Ron Flowers
5	(England) Billy Wright (c)
6	(England) Eddie Clamp
7	(England) Gerry Mannion
8	(Union of South Africa) Cliff Durandt
9	(England) Jimmy Murray
10	(England) Bobby Mason
11	(Union of South Africa) Des Horne
Manager:
(England) Stan Cullis
