= Eddie Stuart =

South African soccer player (1931-2014)

Personal information
- Full name: Edward Albert Stuart
- Date of birth: 12 May 1931
- Place of birth: Middelburg, Eastern Cape, South Africa
- Date of death: 4 November 2014 (aged 83)
- Place of death: Wrexham, Wales
- Position: Right full-back

Senior career*
Years	Team	Apps	(Gls)
1950	Rangers Johannesburg		
1951–1962	Wolverhampton Wanderers	287	(5)
1962–1964	Stoke City	63	(2)
1964–1966	Tranmere Rovers	83	(2)
1966–1968	Stockport County	77	(1)
1968–1970	Worcester City	?	(0)
Total		510	(10)

Managerial career
- 1969–1971: Worcester City (player-manager)
- * Club domestic league appearances and goals

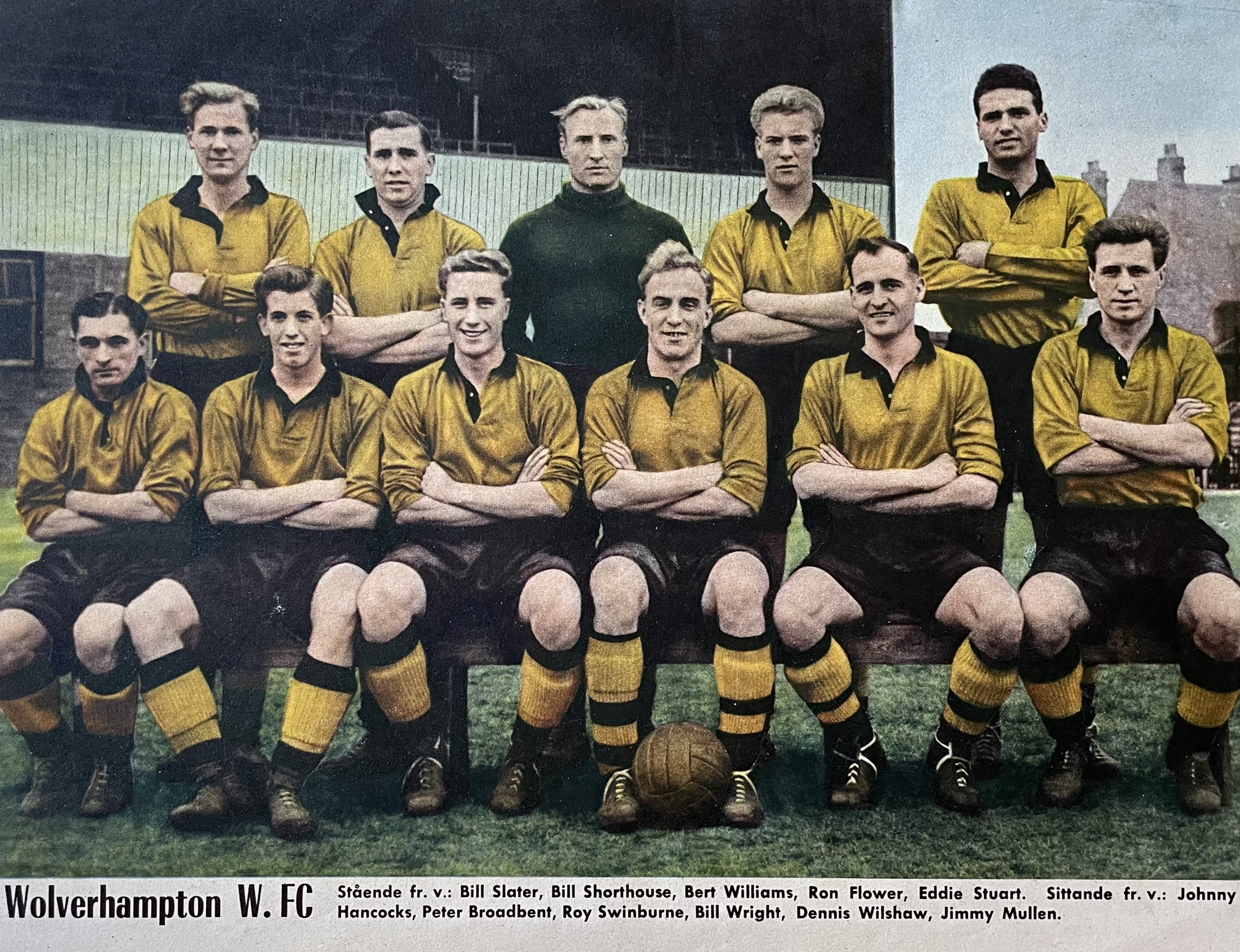
Wolverhampton Wanderers F.C. at 1955 with following players, from left standing: Bill Slater, Bill Shorthouse, Bert Williams, Ron Flowers, Eddie Stuart; front row: Johnny Hancocks, Peter Broadbent, Roy Swinbourne, Billy Wright (captain), Dennis Wilshaw and Jimmy Mullen.

Edward Albert Stuart (12 May 1931 – 4 November 2014) was a South African professional footballer who played as a defender. He played 322 times in England for Wolverhampton Wanderers between 1951 and 1962, winning three league titles and the FA Cup. He also served Stoke City, Tranmere Rovers and Stockport County.

== Career ==
Stuart began his professional career with Rangers of Johannesburg, where he won the South African Cup, before joining English First Division side Wolverhampton Wanderers in January 1951. After spending time in the reserves, he made his senior debut on 15 April 1952, scoring in a 4–1 loss to Black Country rivals West Bromwich Albion. A visit to his homeland saw him contract a tropical disease that hospitalised him and put him out of action for over a year. He returned to the first team for the final months of the 1953–54 season that brought Wolves their first-ever league championship. He remained in the starting team over the remainder of the decade, adding two further league titles, and becoming club captain in 1959 following the retirement of Billy Wright.

In Summer 1962 Stuart joined Stoke City for £8,000. His first season with the club saw them win the Second Division title in 1962–63, and he remained for their return in the top flight. He played 30 matches for Stoke in 1963–64 as they consolidate their top-tier status. He moved to Tranmere Rovers for £4,000 in 1964, and later served Stockport County, where he won the Fourth Division title. He then had a brief spell in management as he became player-manager of non-league Worcester City in 1968, but left the club when he retired from playing in December 1971. After leaving the game, he ran a string of hairdressing salons around the Wolverhampton area.

Stuart died on 4 November 2014 in Wrexham, Wales aged 83 following a long illness.

== Career statistics ==
Club	Season	Division	League		FA Cup		League Cup		Other^{[A]}		Total	
Club	Season	Division	Apps	Goals	Apps	Goals	Apps	Goals	Apps	Goals	Apps	Goals
Wolverhampton Wanderers	1951–52	First Division	2	1	0	0	—		—		2	1
Wolverhampton Wanderers	1952–53	First Division	0	0	0	0	—		—		0	0
Wolverhampton Wanderers	1953–54	First Division	12	0	0	0	—		—		12	0
Wolverhampton Wanderers	1954–55	First Division	33	0	4	0	—		—		37	0
Wolverhampton Wanderers	1955–56	First Division	37	0	1	0	—		—		38	0
Wolverhampton Wanderers	1956–57	First Division	30	4	2	0	—		—		32	4
Wolverhampton Wanderers	1957–58	First Division	40	0	4	0	—		—		44	0
Wolverhampton Wanderers	1958–59	First Division	40	0	4	0	—		3	0	47	0
Wolverhampton Wanderers	1959–60	First Division	28	0	4	0	—		6	0	38	0
Wolverhampton Wanderers	1960–61	First Division	28	0	4	0	0	0	5	0	37	0
Wolverhampton Wanderers	1961–62	First Division	36	0	2	0	0	0	0	0	38	0
Wolverhampton Wanderers	Total		287	5	21	0	0	0	14	0	322	5
Stoke City	1962–63	Second Division	40	2	0	0	1	0	0	0	41	2
Stoke City	1963–64	First Division	23	0	1	0	6	0	0	0	30	0
Stoke City	Total		63	2	1	0	7	0	0	0	71	2
Tranmere Rovers	1964–65	Fourth Division	41	2	2	0	2	0	0	0	45	2
Tranmere Rovers	1965–66	Fourth Division	42	0	1	0	1	0	0	0	44	0
Tranmere Rovers	Total		83	2	3	0	3	0	0	0	89	2
Stockport County	1966–67	Fourth Division	41	1	0	0	2	0	0	0	43	1
Stockport County	1967–68	Third Division	33	0	2	0	0	0	0	0	35	0
Stockport County	Total		77	1	2	0	2	0	0	0	81	1
Career Total			510	10	29	0	12	0	14	0	563	10

A. The "Other" column constitutes appearances and goals in the FA Charity Shield and European Cup.

== Honours ==
Wolverhampton Wanderers

- Football League First Division champions: 1953–54, 1957–58, 1958–59
- FA Cup winner: 1960

Stoke City

- Football League Second Division champions: 1962–63

Stockport County

- Football League Fourth Division champions: 1966–67
