= Colin Booth =

English footballer (1934–2025)

Personal information
- Date of birth: 30 December 1934
- Place of birth: Middleton, Lancashire, England
- Date of death: 12 May 2025 (aged 90)
- Height: 5 ft 9 in (1.75 m)
- Position: Inside forward

Senior career*
Years	Team	Apps	(Gls)
1950–1959	Wolverhampton Wanderers	78	(26)
1959–1962	Nottingham Forest	87	(39)
1962–1964	Doncaster Rovers	88	(57)
1964–1965	Oxford United	48	(23)
1965	Cambridge United		
- Cheltenham Town

International career
1956	England U23	1	(0)
- * Club domestic league appearances and goals

Colin Booth (30 December 1934 – 12 May 2025) was an English professional footballer who played in the Football League as an inside forward for Wolverhampton Wanderers, Nottingham Forest, Doncaster Rovers and Oxford United. He won two league championship medals with Wolverhampton Wanderers.

== Career ==
Booth was born in Middleton, Lancashire, and joined Wolverhampton Wanderers as an apprentice in 1950. He made his first-team debut on 11 April 1955 in a 1–0 win over Aston Villa, one of three appearances that season. He began to establish himself in the following season, as he scored 7 times in 27 outings, before adding 9 goals in just 20 games in the subsequent season. However, he found himself below the likes of Jimmy Murray, Dennis Wilshaw and Bobby Mason in the Wolves attack and managed only a peripheral role in their championship-winning campaign of 1957-58. The next season saw him similarly on the sidelines but he did manage 7 goals from 13 games. Booth scored four goals against Arsenal on 10 November 1956, in a 5–2 victory for Wolves – this is still a record against the Gunners, shared with Billy Walker of Aston Villa who also scored four in 1920. He won an England Under 23 cap in 1956 against France, coming on as a substitute for future teammate Alick Jeffrey, who broke his leg.

In search of regular football, Booth joined Nottingham Forest in October 1959 for £20,000. He scored 41 goals in 98 appearances in total for Forest during two-and-a-half seasons, his best season coming in 1960-61 where he netted 19 times. He then spent two seasons at Doncaster Rovers before joining Oxford United. He ended his career at non-league Cambridge United before leaving the game and working in healthcare. He later lived in Dorset.

== Death ==
On 12 May 2025, Booth died at the age of 90.
