= Eddie Clamp =

English footballer (1934–1995)

Personal information
- Full name: Harold Edwin Clamp
- Date of birth: 14 September 1934
- Place of birth: Coalville, England
- Date of death: 14 December 1995 (aged 61)
- Place of death: Wolverhampton, England
- Height: 5 ft 10 in (1.78 m)
- Position: Right half

Youth career
- Coalville Schools

Senior career*
Years	Team	Apps	(Gls)
1953–1961	Wolverhampton Wanderers	214	(23)
1961–1962	Arsenal	22	(1)
1962–1964	Stoke City	50	(2)
1964–1965	Peterborough United	8	(0)
1965–1967	Worcester City		
Total		294	(26)

International career
1958	England	4	(0)
- * Club domestic league appearances and goals

Harold Edwin Clamp (14 September 1934 – 14 December 1995) was an English footballer who played in the Football League for Arsenal, Peterborough United, Stoke City and Wolverhampton Wanderers. Through his career he was renowned for his 'take no prisoners' style of play and was nicknamed 'Chopper Eddie'.

== Career ==
Clamp joined Wolverhampton Wanderers in 1950, turning professional in April 1952, before breaking into the first team to make his debut on 6 March 1954, away at Manchester United. He made one further appearance that season as he club won their first league title. He later became an integral part of the first team and won League Championships in (1957–58 and 1958–59) and the 1960 FA Cup. He played over 200 matches for Wolves before signing for Arsenal for £34,000 in November 1961. The last signing made by George Swindin, he made his debut against Nottingham Forest on 18 November 1961 but stayed only ten months. His tough tackling style had failed to find favour with his former teammate, now Arsenal manager, Billy Wright, and so he was sold to Stoke City in September 1962 for £35,000.

At Stoke, he won the Second Division title in 1962–63, playing alongside Stanley Matthews. After Ron "Chopper" Harris had poleaxed Matthews in one game Clamp threatened Harris, only to be admonished by the referee, an angry Clamp said "Thats the trouble with you referees. You don't care which side wins!" Matthews said in his autobiography that this was one of the greatest lines ever said on a football pitch. He was described as 'mad' by Stoke trainer Frank Mountford and on more than one occasion he would headbutt an opponent whilst the referee's attention was diverted. He played 28 times for the "Potters" in 1963–64 helping Stoke to reach the League Cup final. But with Clamp again suspended Stoke lost 4–3 over two legs.

He finished his league career at Peterborough United, before dropping into the non-league with Worcester City and Lower Gornal. He retired from football in 1969 to run a building and decorating business in Wednesfield and later became a bricklayer. Clamp also played four times for the England national football team, including three matches in the 1958 FIFA World Cup, after making his debut just before the tournament in a friendly draw in Russia on 18 May before 102,000 spectators.

His mother, Sarah, was Wolverhampton Wanderers' laundry lady for some 30 years beginning in the 1950s before retiring in the 1980s. She outlived her son by 11 years, dying in November 2006 at the age of 94.

== Career statistics ==
=== Club ===
Appearances and goals by club, season and competition
Club	Season	League			FA Cup		League Cup		Other^{[A]}		Total	
Club	Season	Division	Apps	Goals	Apps	Goals	Apps	Goals	Apps	Goals	Apps	Goals
Wolverhampton Wanderers	1953–54	First Division	2	0	0	0	–		–		2	0
Wolverhampton Wanderers	1954–55	First Division	10	0	0	0	–		1	0	11	0
Wolverhampton Wanderers	1955–56	First Division	27	1	1	0	–		–		28	1
Wolverhampton Wanderers	1956–57	First Division	13	1	0	0	–		–		13	1
Wolverhampton Wanderers	1957–58	First Division	41	10	4	0	–		–		45	10
Wolverhampton Wanderers	1958–59	First Division	26	3	0	0	–		2	0	28	3
Wolverhampton Wanderers	1959–60	First Division	38	8	7	2	–		6	0	51	10
Wolverhampton Wanderers	1960–61	First Division	40	0	2	0	0	0	4	0	46	0
Wolverhampton Wanderers	1961–62	First Division	17	0	0	0	0	0	0	0	17	0
Wolverhampton Wanderers	Total		214	23	14	2	0	0	13	0	241	25
Arsenal	1961–62	First Division	18	0	2	0	0	0	–		20	0
Arsenal	1962–63	First Division	4	1	0	0	0	0	–		4	1
Arsenal	Total		22	1	2	0	0	0	0	0	24	1
Stoke City	1962–63	Second Division	32	0	1	0	1	0	–		34	0
Stoke City	1963–64	First Division	18	2	4	0	6	0	–		28	2
Stoke City	Total		50	2	5	0	7	0	0	0	62	2
Peterborough United	1964–65	Third Division	8	0	0	0	0	0	–		8	0
Career total			294	26	21	2	7	0	13	0	335	28

A. The "Other" column constitutes appearances and goals in the FA Charity Shield and European Cup.

=== International ===
National team	Year	Apps	Goals
England	1958	4	0
Total		4	0

== Honours ==
Wolverhampton Wanderers

- Football League First Division: 1957–58, 1958–59
- FA Cup: 1959–60
- FA Youth Cup runner-up: 1953

Stoke City

- Football League Second Division: 1962–63
