= Derek Wilkinson =

Derek Wilkinson is the name of:

- Derek Wilkinson (footballer)
- Derek Wilkinson (ice hockey)
