= Alan Jackson (footballer) =

English footballer

Personal information
- Full name: Alan Arthur Jackson
- Date of birth: 22 August 1938 (age 88)
- Place of birth: Swadlincote, Derbyshire, England
- Position: Inside forward

Youth career
- 1953–1957: Wolverhampton Wanderers

Senior career*
Years	Team	Apps	(Gls)
1957–1959	Wolverhampton Wanderers	4	(1)
1959–1963	Bury	124	(43)
1963–1964	Brighton & Hove Albion	21	(5)
- * Club domestic league appearances and goals

Alan Arthur Jackson (born 22 August 1938) is an English former professional footballer, who played in the Football League for Wolverhampton Wanderers, Bury and Brighton.

== Career ==
Jackson joined Wolverhampton Wanderers as a youngster in 1953. He spent his early professional days in the reserves before finally making his league debut on 7 April 1958 in a 2–0 win at Arsenal. He played in the return game staged just 24 hours later, in a season that saw the club win the league title.

An injury to Jimmy Murray gave Jackson his only other appearances for Wolves during November 1958. He appeared in two further league games (scoring once) and in their first-ever European Cup tie, where he again scored, against Schalke 04.

He was sold to Bury in 1959, where he played the vast majority of his games. He netted 43 goals over four seasons at Gigg Lane before moving to Brighton and Hove Albion. He spent just one full season with the Seagulls before dropping into the non-league with Burton Albion.

After his career in football he became a Junior school teacher. During the 1970s he taught second year juniors at Overseal County Primary school, Woodville Road, Overseal.
