= Gwyn Jones (footballer, born 1935) =

Welsh footballer (1935–2020)

Personal information
- Date of birth: 20 March 1935
- Place of birth: Llandwrog, Gwynedd, Wales
- Date of death: 13 November 2020 (aged 85)
- Place of death: Caernarfon, Wales
- Position: Defender

Senior career*
Years	Team	Apps	(Gls)
- Caernarfon Town
1955–1962	Wolverhampton Wanderers	21	(0)
1962–1966	Bristol Rovers	153	(0)
- Porthmadog
- * Club domestic league appearances and goals

Gwynfor Jones (20 March 1935 – 13 November 2020) was a Welsh footballer, who played in the Football League for Wolverhampton Wanderers and Bristol Rovers.

== Career ==
Jones began his playing career at Caernarfon Town, before joining English First Division high-flyers Wolverhampton Wanderers in 1955.

He made his Wolves debut on 17 December 1955 in a 3–2 win over Black Country rivals West Bromwich Albion. He never found many opportunities for first team football at Molineux though, and managed just 21 appearances over seven years. He did however appear during Wolves' league championship-winning seasons of 1958 and 1959, and played in their 1959 Charity Shield victory.

He joined Bristol Rovers in 1962, where he went on to play over 150 league games over his four years there. He subsequently returned to his native Wales with Porthmadog.

== Death ==
He spent his later years as a resident of Bryn Seiont Newydd Care Home in Caernarfon. He was suffering from dementia when he died, aged 85. He is buried with his late wife, Margaretta, in the graveyard of St Twrog's Church in the village of Llandwrog where he was born.
