= Bryan Yeubrey =

Public relations consultant

Bryan Yeubrey (born 18 August 1960) is a PR consultant and agent for sportspeople, musicians and writers.

== Career ==
As a FIFA licensed players' agent, he has represented international footballers including Essam El-Hadary and Hossam Ghaly. He is also the agent of the "spiderman" climber Alain Robert.

=== Other interests ===
In 1987, Yeubrey and musician Robin George of the band Magnum invented the onboard 'compact tuner', which allowed stringed instruments to include built-in frequency counting tuning device (Patent EP0269652). The Yeubrey/George form of tuning is now a worldwide standard.

Yeubrey is also leading a campaign to honour the former England captain Billy Wright CBE, with a posthumous knighthood.
