= Des Horne =

South African soccer player

Personal information
- Full name: Desmond Tolton Horne
- Date of birth: 12 December 1939
- Place of birth: Durban, South Africa
- Date of death: 20 July 2015 (aged 75)
- Place of death: South Africa
- Position: Outside left

Youth career
- 1956: Durban Railways
- 1956–1958: Wolverhampton Wanderers

Senior career*
Years	Team	Apps	(Gls)
1958–1961	Wolverhampton Wanderers	40	(16)
1961–1966	Blackpool	118	(17)
1966–1969	Southern Suburbs	60	(11)
1970	Powerlines	1	(0)
1970	Durban Celtic		
- * Club domestic league appearances and goals

Desmond Tolton Horne (12 December 1939 – 20 July 2015) was a South African footballer who played as a left-sided winger. He played in the English top flight for Wolverhampton Wanderers, with whom he won the 1960 FA Cup, as well as Blackpool.

== Career ==
Horne was signed by English First Division club Wolverhampton Wanderers in 1956. He was a member of their 1958 FA Youth Cup-winning side before making his first team debut in the following season as Wolves retained the league championship.

The 1959–60 season was his best with the club, making 36 appearances in total – including playing in the European Cup – and scoring 11 times. The campaign ended with Horne playing in the 1960 FA Cup Final where Wolves defeated Blackburn Rovers 3-0 at Wembley. The winger had an assist in this victory as he crossed for Norman Deeley to head in the second goal.

The next year saw Horne less prominent at Molineux and he was transferred to Blackpool in March 1961. Horne remained with the Seasiders for five full seasons (all in the top flight), making over 120 appearances in the process.

He returned to his native South Africa to play for the Southern Suburbs in 1966.

== Death ==
He died aged 75 on 20 July 2015.

== Honours ==
Wolverhampton Wanderers

- FA Cup: 1959–60

== Literature ==
- Calley, Roy (1992). Blackpool: A Complete Record 1887-1992. Breedon Books Sport. ISBN 1-873626-07-X.
