= Alan Shackleton =

English footballer

Personal information
- Date of birth: 3 February 1934
- Place of birth: Padiham, England
- Date of death: 26 April 2009 (aged 75)
- Position: Striker

Senior career*
Years	Team	Apps	(Gls)
1954–1958	Burnley	31	(18)
1958–1959	Leeds United	30	(16)
1959–1960	Everton	26	(10)
1960–1961	Nelson	?	(?)
1961–1962	Oldham Athletic	10	(7)
	Tonbridge	?	(?)
Total		97	(51)
- * Club domestic league appearances and goals

Alan Shackleton (3 February 1934 – 26 April 2009) was an English footballer. He played for Burnley, Leeds United, Everton and Oldham Athletic. Despite good early scoring form at Leeds and Everton, he left for non-league football in the early 1960s.
