= Eddie Clayton =

English footballer

Personal information
- Full name: Eddie Clayton
- Date of birth: 7 May 1937 (age 89)
- Place of birth: Bethnal Green, England
- Position: Midfielder

Senior career*
Years	Team	Apps	(Gls)
1957–1967	Tottenham Hotspur	92	(20)
1967–1970	Southend United	71	(16)
1970	Ashford Town (Kent)	5	(2)
1970–1974	Margate	??	(??)
- * Club domestic league appearances and goals

Eddie Clayton (born 7 May 1937) is an English former footballer.

Clayton most famously played for Tottenham Hotspur as an inside forward. After graduating from the Spurs academy, he scored twice on his debut in a 4–3 victory over Everton at White Hart Lane in April 1958. However, he served mostly as a stand-in for the more expensive signings of Bill Nicholson's famous 1960s side, making over 100 appearances in the process.

After playing at Southend United he joined non-league Ashford Town (Kent) in 1970 and subsequently went on to captain Margate.
