= Tony Biggs (footballer) =

English footballer (1993–2021)

Personal information
- Full name: Anthony Biggs
- Date of birth: 17 April 1936
- Place of birth: Greenford, England
- Date of death: 3 March 2021 (aged 84)
- Place of death: Brent, England
- Position: Forward

Youth career
- Brentford

Senior career*
Years	Team	Apps	(Gls)
–1956	Hounslow Town		
1956–1958	Arsenal	4	(1)
1958–1960	Leyton Orient	4	(1)
1960–1961	Guildford City		
1961–1963	Hereford United	15	(10)
- Folkestone Town

International career
1955–1956	England Amateurs	3	(2)
- * Club domestic league appearances and goals

Anthony Biggs (17 April 1936 – 3 March 2021) was an English footballer who played as a forward in the Football League for Arsenal and Leyton Orient. He won three international caps for England at amateur level and played minor counties cricket for Middlesex's second XI.

== Career statistics ==
Appearances and goals by club, season and competition
Club	Season	League			FA Cup		Other		Total	
Club	Season	Division	Apps	Goals	Apps	Goals	Apps	Goals	Apps	Goals
Arsenal	1957–58	First Division	2	0	0	0	―		2	0
Arsenal	1958–59	First Division	2	1	0	0	―		2	1
Arsenal	Total		4	1	0	0	―		4	1
Hereford United	1961–62	Southern League Premier Division	7	5	3	1		0	10	6
Hereford United	1962–63	Southern League Premier Division	8	5	0	0	1 (Note: Appearance in Welsh Cup)	0	9	5
Hereford United	Total		15	10	3	1	1	0	19	11
Career total			19	11	3	1	1	0	23	12
