= Chris Crowe (footballer) =

English footballer (1939–2003)

Personal information
- Date of birth: 11 June 1939
- Place of birth: Newcastle upon Tyne, England
- Date of death: 30 April 2003 (aged 63)
- Place of death: Bristol, England
- Positions: Inside forward; outside right

Youth career
- 1954–1956: Leeds United

Senior career*
Years	Team	Apps	(Gls)
1956–1960	Leeds United	98	(27)
1960–1962	Blackburn Rovers	51	(6)
1962–1964	Wolverhampton Wanderers	83	(24)
1964–1967	Nottingham Forest	73	(12)
1967–1969	Bristol City	67	(13)
1969	Auburn		
1969–1970	Walsall	13	(1)
1971	Bath City		
Total		382	(83)

International career
1959–1961	England U23	4	(2)
1962	England	1	(0)
- * Club domestic league appearances and goals

Chris Crowe (11 June 1939 – 30 April 2003) was an English international footballer who played as an inside forward and outside right.

== Club career ==
Born in Newcastle upon Tyne (although he spent much of his youth living in Edinburgh and was selected for Scotland Schoolboys), Crowe played for Leeds United, Blackburn Rovers, Wolverhampton Wanderers, Nottingham Forest, Bristol City, Walsall, Auburn (Australia) and Bath City.

== International career ==
Crowe earned one international cap for England in 1962, having also been selected at youth and under-23 levels.
