= 1958–59 in English football =

Football in England
- Season: 1958–59

Men's football
- First Division: Wolverhampton Wanderers
- Second Division: Sheffield Wednesday
- Third Division: Plymouth Argyle
- Fourth Division: Port Vale
- FA Cup: Nottingham Forest
- Charity Shield: Bolton Wanderers

The 1958–59 season was the 79th season of competitive football in England.

== Diary of the season ==
August 1958: The Football League season begins with the new national Third and Fourth divisions that have been created from the old Third Division North and Third Division South.

30 August 1958: The Football Association snub Manchester United's wish to participate in the 1958–59 European Cup.

September 1958: Manchester United pay a national record fee of £45,000 for Sheffield Wednesday inside-forward Albert Quixall.

12 November 1958: Wolverhampton Wanderers play their first European Cup game, drawing 2–2 at home to Schalke 04 in the first round first leg.

18 November 1958: Wolverhampton Wanderers lose 2–1 to Schalke 04 in the European Cup first round second leg in West Germany, ending their hopes of being the first team other than Real Madrid (winners of the first three competitions) to win the European Cup.

15 January 1959: Second Division Liverpool suffer a shock FA Cup third round exit when they lose 2-1 to non league Worcester City.

4 April 1959: Jeff Hall, 29, right-back for Birmingham City and England, dies from polio, prompting widespread takeup of the polio vaccine.

2 May 1959: Nottingham Forest defeat Luton Town 2–1 in the 1959 FA Cup Final.

== Notable debutants ==
8 September 1958: Bobby Moore, 17-year-old wing-half, makes his debut for West Ham United against Manchester United in the First Division.

== Notable retirements ==
May 1959: Billy Wright, 35, Wolverhampton Wanderers and England captain, after more than 500 appearances for his club and a record 105 for his country.

June 1959: Jackie Blanchflower, 26, Manchester United and Northern Ireland centre-half, who announced his retirement as a player after failing to recover sufficiently from injuries sustained in the Munich air disaster 16 months earlier.

== Honours ==
Competition	Winner	Runner-up
First Division	Wolverhampton Wanderers (3)	Manchester United
Second Division	Sheffield Wednesday	Fulham
Third Division	Plymouth Argyle	Hull City
Fourth Division	Port Vale	Coventry City
FA Cup	Nottingham Forest (2)	Luton Town
Charity Shield	Bolton Wanderers	Wolverhampton Wanderers
Home Championship	Shared by England & Northern Ireland	

Notes = Number in parentheses is the times that club has won that honour. * indicates new record for competition

== Awards ==
Football Writers' Association

- Footballer of the Year – Syd Owen (Luton Town)

== Football League ==
=== First Division ===
In the last season of captain Billy Wright's playing career, Wolves retained their First Division title – the third time they had been league champions in six seasons. There was every reason to hope for continued success in the post-Wright era, though, with younger players like Bobby Mason and Mickey Lill excelling in the team. Manchester United enjoyed a good return in the season following the Munich tragedy, as new signings and younger players integrated with crash survivors to achieve runners-up spot in the league. Arsenal, Bolton Wanderers and West Bromwich Albion completed the top five, while newly promoted West Ham United recorded their highest league finish yet by finishing sixth.

Pos	Team	Pld	W	D	L	GF	GA	GAv	Pts	Qualification or relegation
1	Wolverhampton Wanderers (C)	42	28	5	9	110	49	2.245	61	Qualification for the European Cup preliminary round
2	Manchester United	42	24	7	11	103	66	1.561	55	
3	Arsenal	42	21	8	13	88	68	1.294	50	
4	Bolton Wanderers	42	20	10	12	79	66	1.197	50	
5	West Bromwich Albion	42	18	13	11	88	68	1.294	49	
6	West Ham United	42	21	6	15	85	70	1.214	48	
7	Burnley	42	19	10	13	81	70	1.157	48	
8	Blackpool	42	18	11	13	66	49	1.347	47	
9	Birmingham City	42	20	6	16	84	68	1.235	46	
10	Blackburn Rovers	42	17	10	15	76	70	1.086	44	
11	Newcastle United	42	17	7	18	80	80	1.000	41	
12	Preston North End	42	17	7	18	70	77	0.909	41	
13	Nottingham Forest	42	17	6	19	71	74	0.959	40	
14	Chelsea	42	18	4	20	77	98	0.786	40	
15	Leeds United	42	15	9	18	57	74	0.770	39	
16	Everton	42	17	4	21	71	87	0.816	38	
17	Luton Town	42	12	13	17	68	71	0.958	37	
18	Tottenham Hotspur	42	13	10	19	85	95	0.895	36	
19	Leicester City	42	11	10	21	67	98	0.684	32	
20	Manchester City	42	11	9	22	64	95	0.674	31	
21	Aston Villa (R)	42	11	8	23	58	87	0.667	30	Relegation to the Second Division
22	Portsmouth (R)	42	6	9	27	64	112	0.571	21	Relegation to the Second Division

Source: World Football
Rules for classification: 1) Points; 2) Goal average; 3) Goals scored
(C) Champions; (R) Relegated

=== Second Division ===
Sheffield Wednesday sealed an immediate return to the First Division as Second Division champions, being joined by runners-up Fulham.

Pos	Team	Pld	W	D	L	GF	GA	GAv	Pts	Qualification or relegation
1	Sheffield Wednesday (C, P)	42	28	6	8	106	48	2.208	62	Promotion to the First Division
2	Fulham (P)	42	27	6	9	96	61	1.574	60	Promotion to the First Division
3	Sheffield United	42	23	7	12	82	48	1.708	53	
4	Liverpool	42	24	5	13	87	62	1.403	53	
5	Stoke City	42	21	7	14	72	58	1.241	49	
6	Bristol Rovers	42	18	12	12	80	64	1.250	48	
7	Derby County	42	20	8	14	74	71	1.042	48	
8	Charlton Athletic	42	18	7	17	92	90	1.022	43	
9	Cardiff City	42	18	7	17	65	65	1.000	43	
10	Bristol City	42	17	7	18	74	70	1.057	41	
11	Swansea Town	42	16	9	17	79	81	0.975	41	
12	Brighton & Hove Albion	42	15	11	16	74	90	0.822	41	
13	Middlesbrough	42	15	10	17	87	71	1.225	40	
14	Huddersfield Town	42	16	8	18	62	55	1.127	40	
15	Sunderland	42	16	8	18	64	75	0.853	40	
16	Ipswich Town	42	17	6	19	62	77	0.805	40	
17	Leyton Orient	42	14	8	20	71	78	0.910	36	
18	Scunthorpe United	42	12	9	21	55	84	0.655	33	
19	Lincoln City	42	11	7	24	63	93	0.677	29	
20	Rotherham United	42	10	9	23	42	82	0.512	29	
21	Grimsby Town (R)	42	9	10	23	62	90	0.689	28	Relegation to the Third Division
22	Barnsley (R)	42	10	7	25	55	91	0.604	27	Relegation to the Third Division

Rules for classification: 1) Points; 2) Goal average; 3) Goals scored
(C) Champions; (P) Promoted; (R) Relegated

=== Third Division ===
Plymouth Argyle won the first championship of the new national Third Division, with Hull City finishing one point behind them in second place. Norwich City made the headlines with their run to the semi-finals of the FA Cup, but the cup run distracted them from the league as fourth place in the final table was not enough for promotion.

Pos	Team	Pld	W	D	L	GF	GA	GAv	Pts	Promotion or relegation
1	Plymouth Argyle (C, P)	46	23	16	7	89	59	1.508	62	Promotion to the Second Division
2	Hull City (P)	46	26	9	11	90	55	1.636	61	Promotion to the Second Division
3	Brentford	46	21	15	10	76	49	1.551	57	
4	Norwich City	46	22	13	11	89	62	1.435	57	
5	Colchester United	46	21	10	15	71	67	1.060	52	
6	Reading	46	21	8	17	78	63	1.238	50	
7	Tranmere Rovers	46	21	8	17	82	67	1.224	50	
8	Southend United	46	21	8	17	85	80	1.063	50	
9	Halifax Town	46	21	8	17	80	77	1.039	50	
10	Bury	46	17	14	15	69	58	1.190	48	
11	Bradford City	46	18	11	17	84	76	1.105	47	
12	Bournemouth & Boscombe Athletic	46	17	12	17	69	69	1.000	46	
13	Queens Park Rangers	46	19	8	19	74	77	0.961	46	
14	Southampton	46	17	11	18	88	80	1.100	45	
15	Swindon Town	46	16	13	17	59	57	1.035	45	
16	Chesterfield	46	17	10	19	67	64	1.047	44	
17	Newport County	46	17	9	20	69	68	1.015	43	
18	Wrexham	46	14	14	18	63	77	0.818	42	
19	Accrington Stanley	46	15	12	19	71	87	0.816	42	
20	Mansfield Town	46	14	13	19	73	98	0.745	41	
21	Stockport County (R)	46	13	10	23	65	78	0.833	36	Relegation to the Fourth Division
22	Doncaster Rovers (R)	46	14	5	27	50	90	0.556	33	Relegation to the Fourth Division
23	Notts County (R)	46	8	13	25	55	96	0.573	29	Relegation to the Fourth Division
24	Rochdale (R)	46	8	12	26	37	79	0.468	28	Relegation to the Fourth Division

(C) Champions; (P) Promoted; (R) Relegated

=== Fourth Division ===
Port Vale were champions of the new Fourth Division, and were joined in promotion by Coventry City, York City and Shrewsbury Town.

Pos	Team	Pld	W	D	L	GF	GA	GAv	Pts	Promotion or relegation
1	Port Vale (C, P)	46	26	12	8	110	58	1.897	64	Promotion to the Third Division
2	Coventry City (P)	46	24	12	10	84	47	1.787	60	Promotion to the Third Division
3	York City (P)	46	21	18	7	73	52	1.404	60	Promotion to the Third Division
4	Shrewsbury Town (P)	46	24	10	12	101	63	1.603	58	Promotion to the Third Division
5	Exeter City	46	23	11	12	87	61	1.426	57	
6	Walsall	46	21	10	15	95	64	1.484	52	
7	Crystal Palace	46	20	12	14	90	71	1.268	52	
8	Northampton Town	46	21	9	16	85	78	1.090	51	
9	Millwall	46	20	10	16	76	69	1.101	50	
10	Carlisle United	46	19	12	15	62	65	0.954	50	
11	Gillingham	46	20	9	17	82	77	1.065	49	
12	Torquay United	46	16	12	18	78	77	1.013	44	
13	Chester	46	16	12	18	72	84	0.857	44	
14	Bradford (Park Avenue)	46	18	7	21	75	77	0.974	43	
15	Watford	46	16	10	20	81	79	1.025	42	
16	Darlington	46	13	16	17	66	68	0.971	42	
17	Workington	46	12	17	17	63	78	0.808	41	
18	Crewe Alexandra	46	15	10	21	70	82	0.854	40	
19	Hartlepools United	46	15	10	21	74	88	0.841	40	
20	Gateshead	46	16	8	22	56	85	0.659	40	
21	Oldham Athletic	46	16	4	26	59	84	0.702	36	Re-elected
22	Aldershot	46	14	7	25	63	97	0.649	35	Re-elected
23	Barrow	46	9	10	27	51	104	0.490	28	Re-elected
24	Southport	46	7	12	27	41	86	0.477	26	Re-elected

Source: rsssf.com
(C) Division Champions; (P) Promoted

=== Top goalscorers ===
First Division

- Jimmy Greaves (Chelsea) – 33 goals

Second Division

- Brian Clough (Middlesbrough) – 42 goals

Third Division

- Jim Towers (Brentford) – 32 goals

Fourth Division

- Arthur Rowley (Shrewsbury Town) – 37 goals

== National team ==
Although the England national football team eventually shared victory in the 1959 British Home Championship with Northern Ireland, it was a tough year without so many of the squad's key players lost in the Munich air disaster the year before. The season concluded with a disastrous tour of the Americas, in which the team lost three successive games before restoring some pride in the final match against the USA. The final game against the USA was also the last match for veteran defender and captain Billy Wright after a then record 105 caps. The match was played in front of just 13,000 fans on a gravel pitch in Los Angeles.

=== Tour of the Americas ===
13 May 1959

Brazil	2–0	England
Henrique, Julinho

Maracanã Stadium, Rio de Janeiro

17 May 1959

Peru	4–1	England
Juan Seminario 3, Juan Joya		Jimmy Greaves

Estadio Nacional, Lima

24 May 1959

Mexico	2–1	England
Raul Cardenas, Salvador Reyes		Derek Kevan

Estadio Olímpico Universitario, Mexico City

28 May 1959

United States	1–8	England
Ed Murphy		Bobby Charlton 3 (1P), Ron Flowers 2, Warren Bradley, Derek Kevan, Johnny Haynes

Wrigley Field, Los Angeles
