= Phil Kelly (footballer, born 1939) =

Irish footballer (1939–2012)

Personal information
- Full name: James Philip Vincent Kelly
- Date of birth: 10 July 1939
- Place of birth: Dublin, Ireland
- Date of death: 11 August 2012 (aged 73)
- Place of death: Norwich, England
- Position: Full back

Youth career
- Sheldon Town
- Brockhill FC
- 1957–1959: Wolverhampton Wanderers

Senior career*
Years	Team	Apps	(Gls)
1959–1962	Wolverhampton Wanderers	16	(0)
1962–1967	Norwich City	115	(2)
1967–1974	Lowestoft Town	?	(?)
Total		131	(2)

International career
1960–1961	Republic of Ireland	5	(0)
- * Club domestic league appearances and goals

James Philip Vincent Kelly (10 July 1939 – 11 August 2012) was an Irish footballer who played at both professional and international levels as a full back.

== Career ==
=== Club career ===
Born in Dublin, Kelly played in the Football League for Wolverhampton Wanderers and Norwich City, making a total of 131 appearances. He later became player-manager at non-league club Lowestoft Town.

=== International career ===
Kelly earned five caps with the Republic of Ireland during 1960 to 1961.
