= Billy Hartill =

English footballer

Personal information
- Full name: William John Hartill
- Date of birth: 18 July 1905
- Place of birth: Wolverhampton, England
- Date of death: 12 August 1980 (aged 75)
- Place of death: Walsall, England
- Height: 5 ft 11 in (1.80 m)
- Position: Forward

Youth career
- Wolverhampton Town

Senior career*
Years	Team	Apps	(Gls)
1928–1935	Wolverhampton Wanderers	221	(162)
1935	Everton	5	(1)
1936	Liverpool	4	(0)
1936–1938	Bristol Rovers	36	(19)
- * Club domestic league appearances and goals

William John Hartill (18 July 1905 – 12 August 1980), also known as Ted Hartill, was a professional footballer, who spent the majority of his career at Wolverhampton Wanderers. He stands as the club's third-highest goalscorer in their history with 170 goals.

Nicknamed 'Artillery' after a stint serving as a bombardier in the Royal Horse Artillery after leaving school, Hartill joined then-Second Division Wolves as a semi-professional in August 1928, making his league debut on 24 November 1928 at Bradford City. The following year, his first full season as a professional, he scored 33 goals in 36 games to finish as the club's top goalscorer. He repeated this feat in the next three successive seasons (five times in total), helping the club regain their top flight status as Second Division champions in 1931–32.

He remained at Molineux until summer 1935, when he was sold to Everton. His overall tally of 170 goals made him the club's all-time leading goalscorer at the time, a record which stood until April 1980 when broken by John Richards. He twice scored 5 goals in a single match, a record never bettered by a Wolves player, and scored a then club record 16 hat-tricks (later beaten by Steve Bull).

After a brief stay at Everton, he moved across Stanley Park to rivals Liverpool in January 1936, but again his spell with the club was to be short-lived. He managed just 4 games for the Reds during January–February 1936, before moving to Bristol Rovers as part of the deal that saw Phil Taylor move in the opposite direction.

He retired from the game in 1940, after the outbreak of World War II, due to a leg injury suffered two years earlier. He died in August 1980 at the age of 75.
