= Derek Wilkinson (footballer) =

English footballer

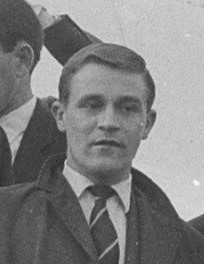
- Wilkinson in 1963

Personal information
- Date of birth: 4 June 1935
- Place of birth: Stalybridge, England
- Date of death: 13 September 2017 (aged 82)
- Height: 5 ft 9 in (1.75 m)
- Position: Right winger

Youth career
- Dukinfield Town

Senior career*
Years	Team	Apps	(Gls)
1953–1965	Sheffield Wednesday	212	(53)
- * Club domestic league appearances and goals

Derek Wilkinson (4 June 1935 – 13 September 2017) was an English footballer who played as a winger, and spent his entire senior career with Sheffield Wednesday.He attended St Paul’s Junior and West Hill Boy’s schools, playing for the latter and N E Cheshire boys. Later teams were Listers Works, Stalybridge Labour Club and Stalybridge Celtic Reserves. He represented Stalybridge and Manchester Amateur Leagues. Sheffield W. signed him from Dukinfield Town. In 1958-59, honoured for the Football League v. the Scottish League and the F.A. XI v. the Army; won a Division II Championship winner’s medal. Wilkinson made 231 appearances for the Owls from 1954 to 1965 before being forced to retire due to injury. Wilkinson died at age 82 after a prolonged illness.
