= George Showell =

English footballer

Personal information
- Full name: George William Showell
- Date of birth: 9 February 1934
- Place of birth: Bilston, England
- Date of death: 18 December 2012 (aged 78)
- Place of death: Wrexham, Wales
- Position: Defender

Youth career
- SE Staffordshire
- 1949–19xx: Wolverhampton Wanderers

Senior career*
Years	Team	Apps	(Gls)
1955–1965	Wolverhampton Wanderers	200	(3)
1965–1966	Bristol City	11	(0)
1966–1968	Wrexham	48	(1)
- * Club domestic league appearances and goals

George William Showell (9 February 1934 – 18 December 2012) was an English professional footballer who played in the Football League for Wolverhampton Wanderers, Bristol City and Wrexham. He spent the majority of his playing career with Wolverhampton Wanderers, featuring in two league championship-winning seasons and in the 1960 FA Cup Final.

== Career ==
Showell was born in Bilston and signed up by Wolverhampton Wanderers in 1949. After several seasons in the reserves, he made his senior debut on 2 April 1955 in a 1–1 draw against Preston North End. This was the first in a run of games he had at the end of the 1954–55 season.

He did however play in two of the club's league championship triumphs, as well as in the 1960 FA Cup Final, where they beat Blackburn Rovers 3–0 at Wembley, and the 1959 and 1960 Charity Shield matches. He finally gained a regular first-team role after Billy Wright retired at the beginning of the 1959–60 campaign, and over the first half of the 1960s was a first-choice player at Molineux, amassing 218 appearances in total.

When the club were relegated in 1965, Showell moved to Bristol City. He spent just eighteen months there before joining Wrexham in November 1966, where he finished his playing career. He remained with Wrexham until 1990, as assistant manager, trainer, caretaker manager, and physiotherapist, and was one of 20 inaugural inductees to the club's Supporters Association Hall of Fame.

He died on 18 December 2012 aged 78. He collapsed while shopping at a supermarket and died later in Wrexham Maelor Hospital.

== Honours ==
Wolverhampton Wanderers

- FA Cup: 1959–60
