= Malcolm Finlayson =

Scottish footballer

Personal information
- Date of birth: 14 June 1930
- Place of birth: Alexandria, Scotland
- Date of death: 26 November 2014 (aged 84)
- Place of death: Dudley, West Midlands, England
- Position: Goalkeeper

Youth career
- Renfrew Juniors

Senior career*
Years	Team	Apps	(Gls)
1948–1956	Millwall	230	(0)
1956–1964	Wolverhampton Wanderers	179	(0)
- * Club domestic league appearances and goals

Malcolm Finlayson (14 June 1930 – 26 November 2014) was a Scottish football goalkeeper who won the league championship and FA Cup with Wolverhampton Wanderers.

== Career ==
Finlayson joined London club Millwall after a trial in February 1948 and quickly made his league debut against West Bromwich Albion on 28 February aged 17. He remained with the Lions for six full seasons in the Third Division. In one notable game against Walsall, he was taken to hospital with the team losing 1-3, only to return patched up during the second half and play on to help the side to a 6-5 win. He was first choice at The Den, making 251 appearances in total, a figure that would likely have been higher but for his time on National Service in the Royal Air Force where he played in the same football team as Ron Flowers.

He was sold to First Division Wolverhampton Wanderers in August 1956 for £3,000, primarily as cover for England international Bert Williams. He made 13 appearances in his first season at Molineux, and his performances earned him the first choice spot during the 1957–58 season as the club won the league title.

The goalkeeper kept his place the following season as he picked up yet another league title winners' medal. He added an FA Cup winners' medal when Wolves defeated Blackburn Rovers 3–0 in the 1960 FA Cup final. The club's domestic success meant Finlayson played in the European Cup against the likes of Barcelona.

Finlayson announced his retirement in May 1964 after playing 203 games in total for Wolves.

After his playing retirement, he went on to become a successful businessman with his steel stockholding company, R & F Steel Stockholders of Kingswinford. After the shareholders’ rebellion against Harry Marshall at Wolves that was led by Wolverhampton insurance-broker Roger Jeffrey Hipkiss, Finlayson rejoined Wolves as vice-chairman during 1982, following his unsuccessful attempt, with Doug Ellis, to buy the club in 1981, which was outbid by the Bhatti Brothers.

Finlayson died at Russells Hall Hospital, Dudley, on 26 November 2014 aged 84.

Finlayson was married for 35 years to his wife Iris who died in 2012 aged 82. They had one son Stuart who died aged 39 in 2009, and one daughter Sandra, who survived him. He was also survived by a partner, Angela Field.

== Honours ==
Wolverhampton Wanderers

- Football League First Division: 1957–58, 1958–59
- FA Cup: 1959–60
