= Gerry Harris =

English footballer (1935–2020)

Personal information
- Full name: Gerald William Harris
- Date of birth: 8 October 1935
- Place of birth: Claverley, Shropshire, England
- Date of death: 28 July 2020 (aged 84)
- Height: 5 ft 10 in (1.78 m)
- Position: Left-back

Youth career
- Bobbington

Senior career*
Years	Team	Apps	(Gls)
1953–1966	Wolverhampton Wanderers	235	(2)
1966–1968	Walsall	15	(1)

International career
1957–1958	England U23	4	(0)
- * Club domestic league appearances and goals

Gerald William Harris (8 October 1935 – 28 July 2020) was an English professional footballer. He spent the majority of his league career with Wolverhampton Wanderers, with whom he won two league championships and the FA Cup.

== Career ==
Harris was signed up by Wolves as an amateur after an unsuccessful trial at West Bromwich Albion in 1953. He turned professional in January 1954, but spent a few seasons in the reserves before finally making his senior debut on 29 August 1956 in a 5–4 win over Luton Town.

He initially only found himself in the team in order to cover for the then-injured Bill Shorthouse, but made the position his own. He was a virtual ever-present over the period 1956–1961, which saw the club win two successive league championships - missing out on a third by a single point - and the 1960 FA Cup. He also appeared in every European Cup game in the club's history to date.

The emergence of Bobby Thomson in 1962 though, pushed Harris out of the first team and he was again consigned to reserve team football over the next few seasons. He returned to contention in the 1964–65 campaign which ended in relegation. He played just twice more for the club after the drop, before moving to neighbours Walsall in 1966, after a total of 270 appearances for Wolves. However, injury curtailed his career with the Saddlers after just 12 months.

After retirement from professional playing, Harris continued to appear in charity matches for the veteran team Wolves Old Stars and he was also captain of the Bylet Bowling Club at Bridgnorth. Harris died in July 2020 aged 84.

== Honours ==
Wolverhampton Wanderers

- Football League First Division: 1957–58, 1958–59
- FA Cup: 1959–60
