= Norman Deeley =

English footballer

Personal information
- Full name: Norman Victor Deeley
- Date of birth: 30 November 1933
- Place of birth: Wednesbury, England
- Date of death: 7 September 2007 (aged 73)
- Place of death: Wednesbury, England
- Height: 5 ft 4 in (1.63 m)
- Position: Outside forward

Senior career*
Years	Team	Apps	(Gls)
1951–1962	Wolverhampton Wanderers	206	(66)
1962–1964	Leyton Orient	73	(9)
Total		279	(75)

International career
1959	England	2	(0)
- * Club domestic league appearances and goals

Norman Victor Deeley (30 November 1933 – 7 September 2007) was an English professional footballer, who spent the majority of his league career with Wolverhampton Wanderers. He scored two goals in the 1960 FA Cup Final, in a performance that won him the Man of the Match award. He also won the league title three times with Wolves and was capped twice by England.

== Career ==
Deeley, who played as a winger, broke into the Wolves team in the early 1950s and went on to win three league titles with the club, before his key role in the FA Cup triumph of 1960. He became a first-choice in the second title-winning season of 1957–58, scoring 23 goals in the process, and following it with 17 more the following year. He had been with the club as an apprentice, making his first team debut on 25 August 1951 in a 2–1 win over Arsenal.

Deeley won two caps during his time at Molineux for the England national team, making his debut on 13 May 1959, on a tour of South America against Brazil, and winning a second and final cap four days later against Peru. He had earlier also represented his country at schoolboy level — at just 4 ft 4 in (1.32 m) tall in 1947, Deeley became the smallest player to play for England schoolboys.

He lost his place in the team during the 1961–62 season, as the club recruited several new wingers. Deeley quickly moved on after this, joining Leyton Orient in February 1962 and helping the club to promotion to the top flight. He played his final season in league football the following campaign as the London team slipped straight back down.

Deeley then moved into non-league football at Worcester City, later having spells at Bromsgrove Rovers and Darlaston before his retirement from the game in 1974. He went on to work as manager of a community centre in Walsall before his retirement.

He died on 7 September 2007, aged 73, from undisclosed causes. Playing fields in his native Wednesbury were later named after him in tribute.

His son Andy Deeley represented New Zealand at international level.

== Honours ==
Wolverhampton Wanderers

- FA Cup: 1959–60
