= Mickey Lill =

English footballer

Personal information
- Date of birth: 3 August 1936
- Place of birth: Romford, England
- Date of death: October 2004 (aged 68)
- Place of death: Johannesburg, South Africa
- Position: Winger

Youth career
- Storey Athletic
- West Ham United

Senior career*
Years	Team	Apps	(Gls)
1957–1960	Wolverhampton Wanderers	30	(15)
1960–1962	Everton	31	(11)
1962–1963	Plymouth Argyle	21	(7)
1963–1965	Portsmouth	39	(5)
1965–1966	Guildford City		
1966–1968	Germiston Callies	60	(32)
- * Club domestic league appearances and goals

Mickey Lill (3 August 1936 – October 2004) was an English footballer who played in the Football League for Wolverhampton Wanderers, Everton, Plymouth Argyle and Portsmouth.

== Career ==
He began as a trainee at London non-league club Storey Athletic before being spotted by West Ham United. However, he left for then-Champions Wolverhampton Wanderers in 1954 still as an apprentice.

The winger made his first team debut on 7 December 1957, scoring in a 2–1 win at Preston North End. However, he did not feature again that season as Wolves won the league title for a second time. He really broke through at Molineux in the following campaign as the club successfully retained the League Championship, making 18 appearances and scoring 12 goals.

Their league triumph gave Lill the chance to appear in the European Cup during the 1959–60 season, but he still found himself on the sidelines often and left for Everton in early 1960.

He played for two full seasons at Everton as the club twice finished in the top five. He was sold in the summer of 1962 to Second Division Plymouth Argyle. After less than a season with the Pilgrims, he moved along the South coast to fellow second-tier club Portsmouth in March 1963.

After a little over two seasons at Fratton Park, followed by one season in the Southern League with Guildford City, Lill left English football in May 1966 to join Germiston Callies in South Africa. He soon became manager/coach of the club after retiring from playing for the period 1968 to 1973. He left Callies to manage Jewish Guild (based in Johannesburg). He eventually worked as a PE teacher at Sacred Heart College, Observatory, just outside central Johannesburg.

He died of cancer in October 2004, aged 68.
