= Bobby Mason =

English footballer

Personal information
- Full name: Robert Henry Mason
- Date of birth: 22 March 1936 (age 90)
- Place of birth: Tipton, Staffordshire, England
- Position: Inside forward

Youth career
- 1951–1954: Wolverhampton Wanderers

Senior career*
Years	Team	Apps	(Gls)
1954–1962	Wolverhampton Wanderers	146	(44)
1962–1963	Chelmsford City		(5)
1963–1964	Leyton Orient	23	(0)
1964–1966	Poole Town		
1966–1967	Chelmsford City		(0)
- * Club domestic league appearances and goals

Robert Henry Mason (born 22 March 1936) is an English former professional footballer, who played in the Football League for Wolverhampton Wanderers, where he spent the majority of his league career, and for Leyton Orient.

== Career ==
Mason was signed up by his local club Wolverhampton Wanderers as a youngster and turned professional in 1954. He spent time in the reserves and youth ranks - playing in the 1954 FA Youth Cup Final - before he finally made his league debut on 5 November 1955 in a 1–5 defeat at Luton Town.

He made only a handful of appearances until the departure of Dennis Wilshaw in December 1957 opened the door for him. He took his chance and scored 10 goals during the remainder of the 1957–58 season to help Wolves win the league title. He continued his form the following year as he scored 13 times en route to a second successive championship.

The 1959–60 season brought his best seasonal tally - 15 goals - but the club missed out on a third successive title by a single point. He also netted four times during their European Cup campaign that year, but missed out playing in the 1960 FA Cup Final when he lost his place on the eve of the game to Barry Stobart.

After two more modest goalscoring seasons, he left Molineux in June 1962. He initially dropped into the non-league with Chelmsford City but returned to the Football League for the 1963–64 season with Leyton Orient. He later had brief spells with Poole Town and Parley Sports before retiring from the game in 1965.

Today, he resides in Swadlincote, Derbyshire.
