= Billy Wright (footballer, born 1924) =

English footballer (1924–1994)

Billy Wright CBE
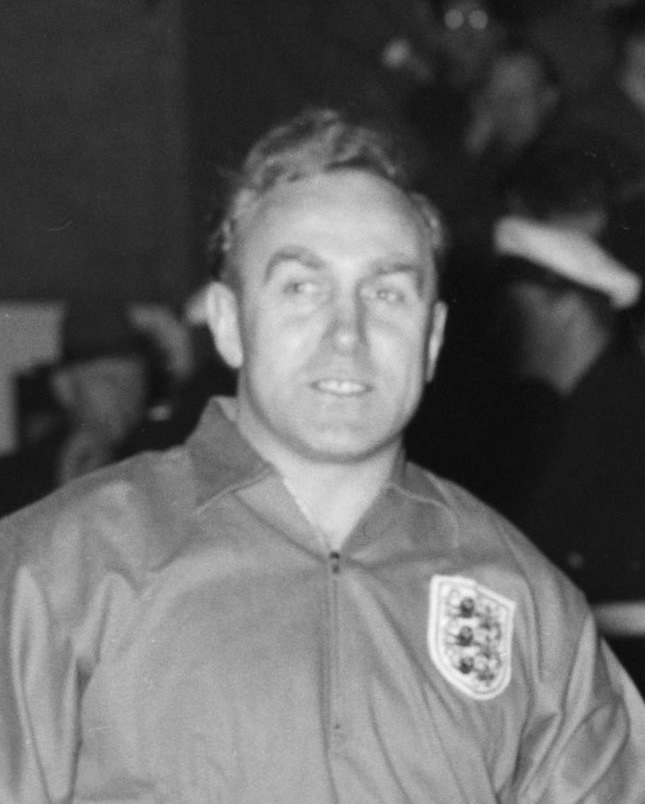
- Wright in 1961

Personal information
- Full name: William Ambrose Wright
- Date of birth: 6 February 1924
- Place of birth: Ironbridge, Shropshire, England
- Date of death: 3 September 1994 (aged 70)
- Place of death: London, England
- Height: 5 ft 8 in (1.73 m)
- Position: Centre-back

Senior career*
Years	Team	Apps	(Gls)
1939–1959	Wolverhampton Wanderers	490	(13)

International career
1948	England B	1	(1)
1946–1959	England	105	(3)

Managerial career
- 1962–1966: Arsenal
- * Club domestic league appearances and goals

William Ambrose Wright (6 February 1924 – 3 September 1994) was an English footballer who played as a centre-back. He spent his entire club career at Wolverhampton Wanderers. The first male footballer in the world to earn 100 international caps, Wright also held the record for longest unbroken run in competitive international football, with 70 consecutive appearances, although that was surpassed by Andoni Zubizarreta's 86 consecutive appearances for Spain (1985–94). He also made a total of 105 appearances for England, captaining them a record 90 times, including during their campaigns at the 1950, 1954 and 1958 World Cup.

== Early life and education ==
Wright was born at 33 Belmont Road, Ironbridge, Shropshire, his father Thomas was a worker at the Coalbrookdale Company ironworks. He was educated at Madeley Wood Methodist School and Madeley Modern School, playing in the teams of both schools.

== Club career ==
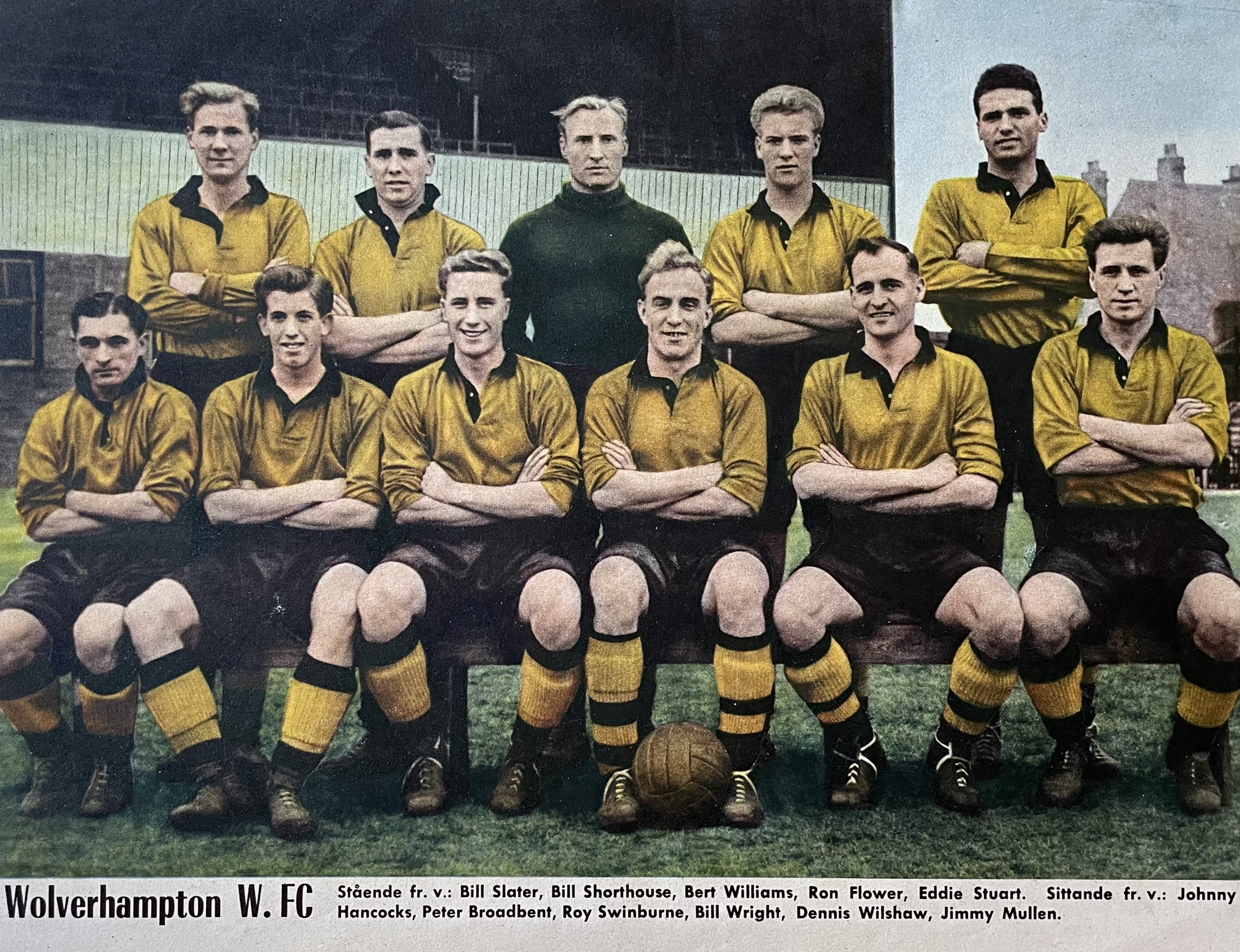
Wolverhampton Wanderers F.C. at 1955 with following players, from left standing: Bill Slater, Bill Shorthouse, Bert Williams, Ron Flowers, Eddie Stuart; front row: Johnny Hancocks, Peter Broadbent, Roy Swinbourne, Billy Wright (captain), Dennis Wilshaw and Jimmy Mullen.

After playing during March–April that year for Cradley Heath in a dual player-groundsman role, Wright's association with Wolverhampton Wanderers began in 1938 when, after being encouraged by his school teacher to respond to a newspaper advertisement inviting boys for trials, he was taken on as a member of their ground staff. He was only 14 years old when he made his debut for Wolves for the B team game against Walsall Wood in the Walsall Minor League.

Wright had been accepted on an eight-month trial by Major Frank Buckley, who had initially told Billy that he was "too small" to be taken on. In early September 1939 League and Cup football was suspended due to the outbreak of World War II.

On 23 September 1939 Wright, who was then fifteen, played his first match for the Wolves senior side in a friendly against West Bromwich Albion. Wolves beat the Baggies 5–3 in front of 5,000 fans at The Hawthorns. Along with Wolves team-mate Jimmy Mullen, Billy also played as a guest for Leicester City, playing as both a forward and a defender before he returned to Molineux in 1942. A broken ankle put his career in doubt but he recovered and joined the Kings Shropshire Light Infantry in 1943, serving as a Physical Training Instructor. Wright played for Wolves whenever possible and made over 100 appearances for Wolves in wartime football.

Wright made his official debut for Wolves in January 1946 against Lovells Athletic in the third round of the FA Cup. He became club captain soon after and with Wright leading the team, Wolves won the First Division title three times (1953–54, 1957–58 and 1958–59) as well as the FA Cup in 1949. He was a virtual ever-present, missing only 31 games for Wolves during the 1950s. He retired from playing in April 1959.

== International career ==
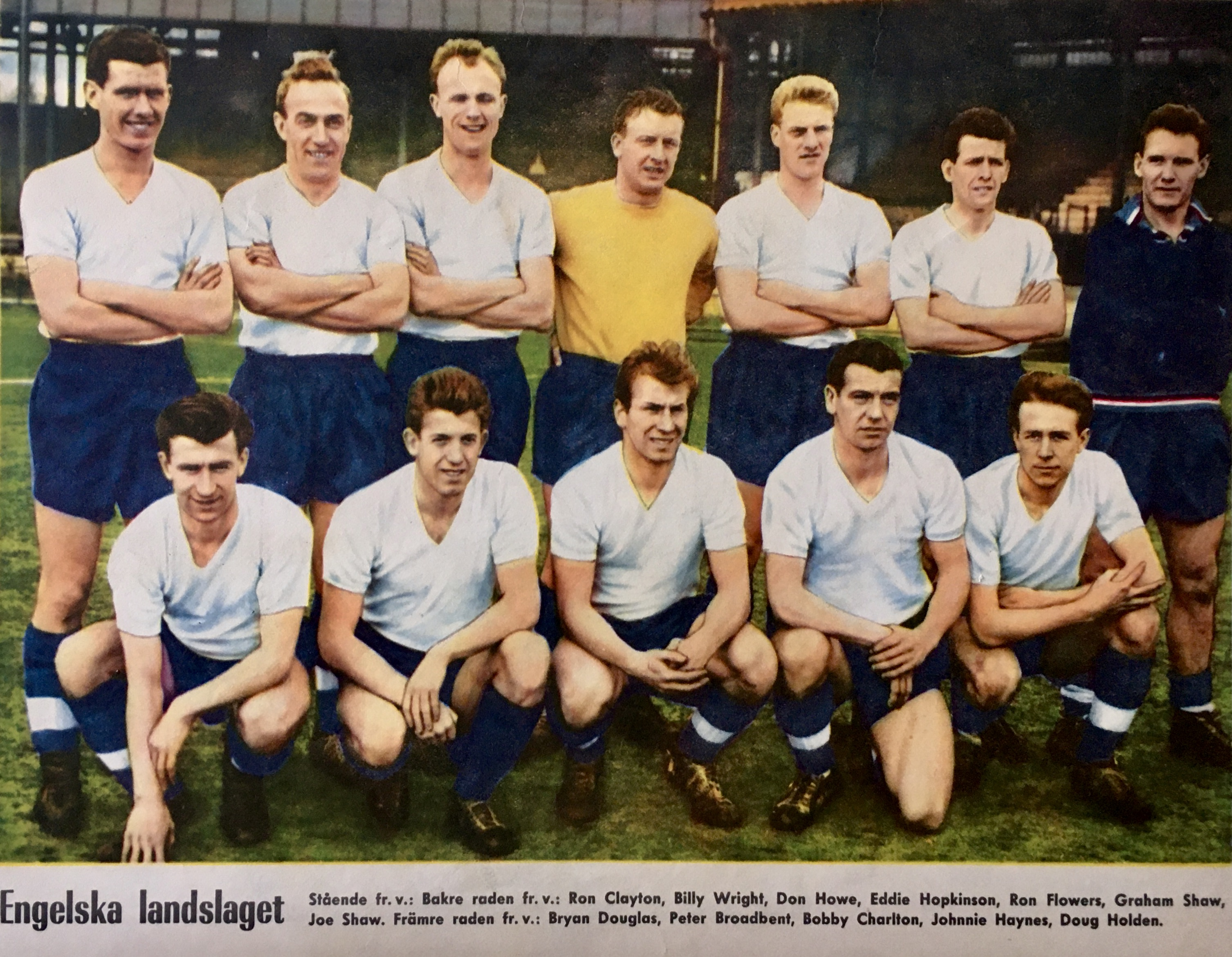
Billy Wright – back row, second from left – in an England side where he was captain. Photo taken just before playing his 100th international match against Scotland in April 1959.

Wright's performances for club saw him earn a call-up to the England team. His full debut came on 28 September 1946 in a thumping 7–2 win against Ireland. He was made captain in 1948, a role he held for 90 games until his retirement (an all-time record shared subsequently with Bobby Moore). In 1952, with his 42nd cap, he surpassed Bob Crompton's appearance record for England, which had stood since 1914. In total, he made 70 consecutive full international appearances with 105 in all, scoring three times. He was also the first footballer in the world to earn 100 caps, reaching the landmark in a 1–0 victory over Scotland at Wembley on 11 April 1959. It was more than a decade before his record was broken by another player, Bobby Charlton.

More than 60 years later, just eight other players have made more appearances for the England side than Wright.

== Managerial career ==
Wright became manager of England's youth team in 1960, and was initially chosen as assistant manager of the senior side by Walter Winterbottom ahead of the 1962 FIFA World Cup in Chile, before turning down the role after being appointed manager of Arsenal in 1962, replacing George Swindin. Initially Arsenal started strongly under Wright, finishing seventh in 1962–63 and qualifying for Europe for the first time in their history, but failed to build on this. Wright enjoyed mixed success with his signings, who included successes such as Bob Wilson, Joe Baker and Frank McLintock, but also less successful players such as Ian Ure.

Arsenal were unable to improve on their seventh in Wright's first season in charge, and their form gradually declined. Wright won only 38.46% of his matches in charge, the lowest rate for any post-war Arsenal manager (caretaker managers excepted). After a poor 1965–66 season – where Arsenal finished 14th and were knocked out of the FA Cup by Blackburn Rovers (who finished bottom of the First Division) — Wright was dismissed by the Arsenal board in the summer of 1966.

Football writer Brian Glanville, discussing Billy Wright's time at Arsenal, wrote: "he had neither the guile nor the authority to make things work and he reacted almost childishly to criticism".

== Life after football ==
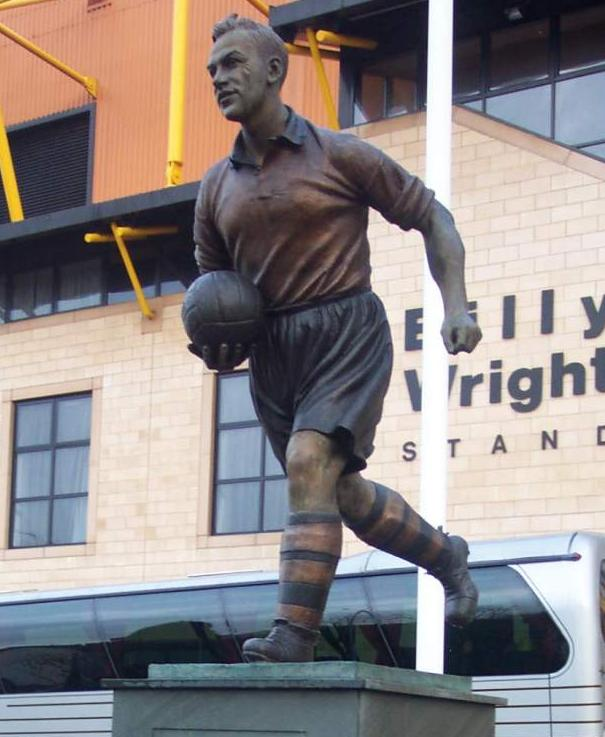
Statue of Billy Wright outside Wolves' Molineux Stadium

Wright was a minor media personality, and his marriage to Joy Beverley of the Beverley Sisters occurred at a time long before the era of footballers being known for having celebrity girlfriends. This was in July 1958, by which time Wright was 34, and proved one of the most successful showbiz marriages.

After leaving Arsenal, Wright successfully overcame alcoholism and he later became a television pundit and Head of Sport for ATV and Central Television, before retiring in 1989. The following year, he joined the board of directors at Wolverhampton Wanderers as part of the takeover by Sir Jack Hayward.

On 7 August 1993, he presented Manchester United with the FA Charity Shield, which they won on penalties against Arsenal at Wembley Stadium. On 7 December that year he was present for the friendly game against Honved of Hungary which commemorated the re-opening of Molineux as a rebuilt 28,525-seat stadium. The redevelopment saw three new stands built at the stadium in the space of two years, with the one replacing the Waterloo Road Stand being designated the Billy Wright Stand.

Wright was the subject of This Is Your Life on two occasions: in May 1961 when he was surprised by Eamonn Andrews at the EMI Studios in London's St John's Wood, and in January 1990, when Michael Aspel surprised him at Thames Television's Teddington Studios. Wright went on to be appointed a Commander of the Order of the British Empire on 13 June 1959.

== Illness and death ==
Wright died from pancreatic cancer on 3 September 1994, aged 70, having been diagnosed with the illness earlier in the year. He was cremated and his ashes were scattered on the pitch at Molineux.

== Legacy ==
In 2009, English football agent Bryan Yeubrey began a public campaign to obtain a posthumous knighthood for Wright. The campaign received support from several thousand fans and many former professional players.

In 2008, Midland Metro named an AnsaldoBreda T-69 tram in his honour.

== Honours ==
Wolverhampton Wanderers

- Football League First Division: 1953–54, 1957–58, 1958–59
- FA Cup: 1948–49
- FA Charity Shield: 1949, 1954

Individual

- FWA Footballer of the Year: 1952
- Ballon d'Or runner-up: 1957
- Commander of the Order of the British Empire: 1959
- International Football Hall of Fame: 1997
- Football League 100 Legends: 1998
- Member of English Football Hall of Fame: 2002
- Wolverhampton Wanderers FC Hall of Fame: 2009

== See also ==
- List of men's footballers with 100 or more international caps

Sporting positions
Preceded by George Hardwick	England captain 1948–1959	Succeeded by Johnny Haynes
