= Jimmy Murray (English footballer) =

English footballer (1935–2008)

Personal information
- Full name: James Robert Murray
- Date of birth: 11 October 1935
- Place of birth: Elvington, England
- Date of death: 27 September 2008 (aged 72)
- Place of death: Lichfield, England
- Position: Forward

Senior career*
Years	Team	Apps	(Gls)
1955–1963	Wolverhampton Wanderers	273	(199)
1963–1967	Manchester City	70	(43)
1967–1969	Walsall	57	(13)
1969–1971	Telford United	39	(19)

International career
1958–1959	England U23	2	(2)
- * Club domestic league appearances and goals

James Robert Murray (11 October 1935 – 27 September 2008) was an English footballer, who spent the majority of his league career with Wolverhampton Wanderers.

== Career ==
Murray was signed up by Wolves as a youngster and turned professional in November 1953. He spent a few seasons in the reserves before he finally made his league debut on 12 November 1955 in a 2–0 win over Charlton Athletic.

He quickly established himself within the team that season, scoring 11 goals, and remained a prolific scorer for the club over the following seasons. In 1957/58, he was the leading goalscorer as the club captured the league title, which they retained the next season. Murray also won an FA Cup winners medal in 1960, as he played in the 3–0 final win over Blackburn Rovers.

His time at Molineux also saw him appearing in European games, and scoring against the likes of Barcelona. He finally left for Manchester City for £27,000 in November 1963 after scoring a total of 166 goals in 299 senior games, ending as leading goalscorer in three seasons.

At Maine Road, the striker was part of the side that won promotion back to the top flight in 1965/66, before ending his league career at Third Division Walsall. He finished his playing days with two seasons at non-league Telford United, where he reached two successive FA Trophy finals (one victoriously).

After ending his playing career, Murray ran a greengrocers in Tamworth and later worked for a contract car company. He died in Lichfield, where he had resided, on 27 September 2008 from prostate cancer, aged 72.

== Honours ==
Wolverhampton Wanderers

- FA Cup Winner 1959 -1960
- Football League Division 1 Champions 1958–1959
- Football League Division 1 Champions 1957–1958
