= 1957–58 in English football =

Football in England
- Season: 1957–58

Men's football
- First Division: Wolverhampton Wanderers
- Second Division: West Ham United
- Third Division North: Scunthorpe & Lindsey United
- Third Division South: Brighton & Hove Albion
- FA Cup: Bolton Wanderers
- FA Amateur Cup: Woking
- Charity Shield: Manchester United

The 1957–58 season was the 78th season of competitive football in England.

The season ended with Wolverhampton Wanderers as First Division champions after scoring 103 goals and Bolton Wanderers as FA Cup winners. However, the season is remembered most for the Munich air disaster which occurred on 6 February 1958 and involved Manchester United on the return flight from a European Cup quarter-final win in Yugoslavia; 23 people died as a result of their injuries in the crash, including eight of the club's players.

== Overview ==
At the end of the season, Sunderland were relegated for the first time in their history. This was the last season to feature a regionalised Third Division. At the end of the season, the teams finishing between 2nd and 12th in the North and South divisions were placed in the new national Third Division, with the remainder being transferred to the new Fourth Division.

== Diary of the season ==
31 August 1957: The Manchester derby at Old Trafford sees United beat City 4–1 with goals from Duncan Edwards, Tommy Taylor, Johnny Berry and Dennis Viollet.

18 September 1957: In the First Division, Nottingham Forest beat Burnley 7–0, the first time they have scored seven without reply since 1950 in the Third Division South.

28 September 1957: Wolverhampton Wanderers beat Manchester United at home 3–1 with two goals from Dennis Wilshaw and one from Norman Deeley.

10 October 1957: The England squad to face Wales is announced, and features three newcomers. They are Bolton Wanderers goalkeeper Eddie Hopkinson, Blackburn Rovers' Bryan Douglas and Don Howe of West Bromwich Albion.

16 November 1957: Wolverhampton Wanderers lose their 100% home record to local rivals West Bromwich Albion in a 1–1 draw. Until then the home team had won eight successive home games, scoring 27 goals and conceding only five.

1 December 1957: Harry Gregg becomes the world's most expensive goalkeeper after joining Manchester United from Doncaster Rovers for a fee of £23,500.

7 December 1957: Everton's Dave Hickson is sent off from their all-North West clash with Manchester City.

13 December 1957: Evertonian Tony McNamara heads across Stanley Park to join Liverpool.

25 December 1957: Tottenham Hotspur, in their 1–0 home victory, become only the second team (Everton did so in the first game of the season) in the whole season to prevent Wolverhampton Wanderers from scoring.

3 January 1958: Liverpool add "much-wanted" Hibernian inside forward Jimmy Harrower to their ranks, paying a fee that "tops £10,000".

9–10 January 1958: Dave Hickson is suspended by The Football Association for 21 days, with their disciplinary committee taking into account "the player's record on previous misconduct"; Everton order him not to comment.

15 January 1958: Manchester United manager Matt Busby accepts an offer to become manager of the Scotland national football team, while attending the under-23 international at Goodison Park between England and Scotland. Reports suggest Busby will assume command before the match between Scotland and a Scottish Football League XI on 3 February.

1 February 1958: A thrilling First Division match at Highbury sees Manchester United defeat Arsenal 5–4.

5 February 1958: Manchester United reach the European Cup semi-finals with a 3–3 draw (5–4 win on aggregate) in the quarter-final second leg against Red Star Belgrade in Yugoslavia.

6 February 1958: The Manchester United team plane crashes at Munich Airport in West Germany. 21 people are killed, including seven of the team's players (Roger Byrne, Geoff Bent, Eddie Colman, Bill Whelan, Tommy Taylor, David Pegg and Mark Jones) and three club officials (secretary Walter Crickmer, coach Tom Curry and trainer Bert Whalley). Also among the dead is journalist Frank Swift, the former Manchester City and England goalkeeper. Ten other players are injured, with doctors being particularly concerned about the conditions of winger Johnny Berry and left-half Duncan Edwards. Manager Matt Busby is also seriously injured.

19 February 1958: In their first game since the Munich air disaster, Manchester United (with a side mostly made up of reserve players) defeat Sheffield Wednesday 3–0 in the FA Cup fifth round at Old Trafford. However, the victory is overshadowed by news from Munich that the condition of Duncan Edwards has deteriorated once more.

21 February 1958: 21-year-old Duncan Edwards dies in hospital from injuries sustained fifteen days ago in the Munich air disaster.

13 March 1958: Liverpool's leading goalscorer, Tony Rowley, signs for Tranmere Rovers.

12 April 1958: Woking win the FA Amateur Cup after victory over Ilford in the final 3–0, in front of a young Martin Tyler.

26 April 1958: Wolverhampton Wanderers are crowned champions after scoring their 103rd goal of the season, but are beaten by already-relegated Sheffield Wednesday in their last league game of the season, while in the Second Division the Anglo-Welsh derby between Bristol City and Swansea Town goes the way of Swansea. Meanwhile, two England representative teams are in action, as the schoolboys win 3–1 over their Scottish equivalents at Wembley Stadium in front of 90,000, while the England amateurs drew 1–1 against France.

3 May 1958: Nat Lofthouse scores both goals as Bolton Wanderers beat Manchester United 2–0 in the Final at Wembley to win the FA Cup for the fourth time.

== Notable debutants ==
24 August 1957: Jimmy Greaves, 17-year-old forward, scores once on his debut for Chelsea in a First Division fixture against Tottenham Hotspur.

28 September 1957: Gerry Byrne, 19-year-old left-back, makes his debut for illness-ravaged Liverpool.

21 December 1957: Kenny Morgans, 18-year-old winger, makes his debut for Manchester United in First Division home match against Leicester City.

19 February 1958: Shay Brennan, 20-year-old winger, scores twice on his debut for Manchester United as they beat Sheffield Wednesday 3–0 in the FA Cup third round, their first game after the Munich air disaster.

== Honours ==
Competition	Winner	Runner-up
First Division	Wolverhampton Wanderers (2)	Preston North End
Second Division	West Ham United	Blackburn Rovers
Third Division North	Scunthorpe & Lindsey United	Accrington Stanley
Third Division South	Brighton & Hove Albion	Brentford
FA Cup	Bolton Wanderers (4)	Manchester United
Charity Shield	Manchester United	Aston Villa
Home Championship	Shared by England & Northern Ireland	

Notes = Number in parentheses is the times that club has won that honour. * indicates new record for competition

== Awards ==
Football Writers' Association

- Footballer of the Year – Danny Blanchflower (Tottenham Hotspur)

Top goalscorer

- Bobby Smith (Tottenham Hotspur), 36

== Football League ==
=== First Division ===
The First Division title went to Wolves, still captained by Billy Wright and managed by Stan Cullis. Preston North End finished runners-up, while Tottenham Hotspur finished third thanks largely to the influence of captain and Footballer of the Year, Danny Blanchflower. West Bromwich Albion finished fourth and the top five was completed by Manchester City, who became the first and so far only club to both score and concede 100 goals in a league season. After the Munich air disaster, Manchester United won only one more league game and dropped to ninth place, although they did reach the FA Cup final, where they were beaten by Bolton Wanderers.

Sheffield Wednesday propped up the First Division and were the first side to be relegated, being joined soon after by a Sunderland side who had been in the First Division for nearly seventy years.

Pos	Team	Pld	W	D	L	GF	GA	GAv	Pts	Qualification or relegation
1	Wolverhampton Wanderers (C)	42	28	8	6	103	47	2.191	64	Qualification for the European Cup first round
2	Preston North End	42	26	7	9	100	51	1.961	59	
3	Tottenham Hotspur	42	21	9	12	93	77	1.208	51	
4	West Bromwich Albion	42	18	14	10	92	70	1.314	50	
5	Manchester City	42	22	5	15	104	100	1.040	49	
6	Burnley	42	21	5	16	80	74	1.081	47	
7	Blackpool	42	19	6	17	80	67	1.194	44	
8	Luton Town	42	19	6	17	69	63	1.095	44	
9	Manchester United	42	16	11	15	85	75	1.133	43	
10	Nottingham Forest	42	16	10	16	69	63	1.095	42	
11	Chelsea	42	15	12	15	83	79	1.051	42	Qualification for the Inter-Cities Fairs Cup first round
12	Arsenal	42	16	7	19	73	85	0.859	39	
13	Birmingham City	42	14	11	17	76	89	0.854	39	Qualification for the Inter-Cities Fairs Cup first round
14	Aston Villa	42	16	7	19	73	86	0.849	39	
15	Bolton Wanderers	42	14	10	18	65	87	0.747	38	
16	Everton	42	13	11	18	65	75	0.867	37	
17	Leeds United	42	14	9	19	51	63	0.810	37	
18	Leicester City	42	14	5	23	91	112	0.813	33	
19	Newcastle United	42	12	8	22	73	81	0.901	32	
20	Portsmouth	42	12	8	22	73	88	0.830	32	
21	Sunderland (R)	42	10	12	20	54	97	0.557	32	Relegation to the Second Division
22	Sheffield Wednesday (R)	42	12	7	23	69	92	0.750	31	Relegation to the Second Division

Source: World Football
Rules for classification: 1) Points; 2) Goal average; 3) Goals scored
(C) Champions; (R) Relegated

=== Second Division ===
West Ham United topped the Second Division to secure First Division football for the first time in the postwar era, while Blackburn Rovers finished one point behind them in second place. Charlton Athletic missed out on an immediate return to the First Division by a single point, while Liverpool missed out on promotion by two points. With six games remaining in the season, Lincoln City looked certain to be relegated - five points adrift of the club above them, and having won only five matches all season. Incredibly they won their last six matches to escape relegation by a single point.

Pos	Team	Pld	W	D	L	GF	GA	GAv	Pts	Qualification or relegation
1	West Ham United (C, P)	42	23	11	8	101	54	1.870	57	Promotion to the First Division
2	Blackburn Rovers (P)	42	22	12	8	93	57	1.632	56	Promotion to the First Division
3	Charlton Athletic	42	24	7	11	107	69	1.551	55	
4	Liverpool	42	22	10	10	79	54	1.463	54	
5	Fulham	42	20	12	10	97	59	1.644	52	
6	Sheffield United	42	21	10	11	75	50	1.500	52	
7	Middlesbrough	42	19	7	16	83	74	1.122	45	
8	Ipswich Town	42	16	12	14	68	69	0.986	44	
9	Huddersfield Town	42	14	16	12	63	66	0.955	44	
10	Bristol Rovers	42	17	8	17	85	80	1.063	42	
11	Stoke City	42	18	6	18	75	73	1.027	42	
12	Leyton Orient	42	18	5	19	77	79	0.975	41	
13	Grimsby Town	42	17	6	19	86	83	1.036	40	
14	Barnsley	42	14	12	16	70	74	0.946	40	
15	Cardiff City	42	14	9	19	63	77	0.818	37	
16	Derby County	42	14	8	20	60	81	0.741	36	
17	Bristol City	42	13	9	20	63	88	0.716	35	
18	Rotherham United	42	14	5	23	65	101	0.644	33	
19	Swansea Town	42	11	9	22	72	99	0.727	31	
20	Lincoln City	42	11	9	22	55	82	0.671	31	
21	Notts County (R)	42	12	6	24	44	80	0.550	30	Relegation to the Third Division
22	Doncaster Rovers (R)	42	8	11	23	56	88	0.636	27	Relegation to the Third Division

Rules for classification: 1) Points; 2) Goal average; 3) Goals scored
(C) Champions; (P) Promoted; (R) Relegated

=== Third Division North ===
Scunthorpe & Lindsey United sealed the Third Division North title by a comfortable margin and secured their place in the Second Division, while runners-up Accrington Stanley had the consolation of at least being able to play in the third of the league's fourth tiers following the decision to reorganise into four national divisions for the 1958–59 season.

Pos	Team	Pld	W	D	L	GF	GA	GAv	Pts	Promotion or relegation
1	Scunthorpe & Lindsey United (C, P)	46	29	8	9	88	50	1.760	66	Promotion to the Second Division
2	Accrington Stanley	46	25	9	12	83	61	1.361	59	Qualification for the Third Division
3	Bradford City	46	21	15	10	73	49	1.490	57	Qualification for the Third Division
4	Bury	46	23	10	13	94	62	1.516	56	Qualification for the Third Division
5	Hull City	46	19	15	12	78	67	1.164	53	Qualification for the Third Division
6	Mansfield Town	46	22	8	16	100	92	1.087	52	Qualification for the Third Division
7	Halifax Town	46	20	11	15	83	69	1.203	51	Qualification for the Third Division
8	Chesterfield	46	18	15	13	71	69	1.029	51	Qualification for the Third Division
9	Stockport County	46	18	11	17	74	67	1.104	47	Qualification for the Third Division
10	Rochdale	46	19	8	19	79	67	1.179	46	Qualification for the Third Division
11	Tranmere Rovers	46	18	10	18	82	76	1.079	46	Qualification for the Third Division
12	Wrexham	46	17	12	17	61	63	0.968	46	Qualification for the Third Division
13	York City (R)	46	17	12	17	68	76	0.895	46	Relegation to the Fourth Division
14	Gateshead (R)	46	15	15	16	68	76	0.895	45	Relegation to the Fourth Division
15	Oldham Athletic (R)	46	14	17	15	72	84	0.857	45	Relegation to the Fourth Division
16	Carlisle United (R)	46	19	6	21	80	78	1.026	44	Relegation to the Fourth Division
17	Hartlepools United (R)	46	16	12	18	73	76	0.961	44	Relegation to the Fourth Division
18	Barrow (R)	46	13	15	18	66	74	0.892	41	Relegation to the Fourth Division
19	Workington (R)	46	14	13	19	72	81	0.889	41	Relegation to the Fourth Division
20	Darlington (R)	46	17	7	22	78	89	0.876	41	Relegation to the Fourth Division
21	Chester (R)	46	13	13	20	73	81	0.901	39	Relegation to the Fourth Division
22	Bradford (Park Avenue) (R)	46	13	11	22	68	95	0.716	37	Relegation to the Fourth Division
23	Southport (R)	46	11	6	29	52	88	0.591	28	Re-elected to the Fourth Division
24	Crewe Alexandra (R)	46	8	7	31	47	93	0.505	23	Re-elected to the Fourth Division

Source: rsssf.com
(C) Champions; (P) Promoted; (R) Relegated

=== Third Division South ===
Brighton & Hove Albion won promotion to the Second Division as champions of the Third Division South.

Pos	Team	Pld	W	D	L	GF	GA	GAv	Pts	Promotion or relegation
1	Brighton & Hove Albion (C, P)	46	24	12	10	88	64	1.375	60	Promotion to the Second Division
2	Brentford	46	24	10	12	82	56	1.464	58	Qualification for the Third Division
3	Plymouth Argyle	46	25	8	13	67	48	1.396	58	Qualification for the Third Division
4	Swindon Town	46	21	15	10	79	50	1.580	57	Qualification for the Third Division
5	Reading	46	21	13	12	79	51	1.549	55	Qualification for the Third Division
6	Southampton	46	22	10	14	112	72	1.556	54	Qualification for the Third Division
7	Southend United	46	21	12	13	90	58	1.552	54	Qualification for the Third Division
8	Norwich City	46	19	15	12	75	70	1.071	53	Qualification for the Third Division
9	Bournemouth & Boscombe Athletic	46	21	9	16	81	74	1.095	51	Qualification for the Third Division
10	Queens Park Rangers	46	18	14	14	64	65	0.985	50	Qualification for the Third Division
11	Newport County	46	17	14	15	73	67	1.090	48	Qualification for the Third Division
12	Colchester United	46	17	13	16	77	79	0.975	47	Qualification for the Third Division
13	Northampton Town (R)	46	19	6	21	87	79	1.101	44	Relegation to the Fourth Division
14	Crystal Palace (R)	46	15	13	18	70	72	0.972	43	Relegation to the Fourth Division
15	Port Vale (R)	46	16	10	20	67	58	1.155	42	Relegation to the Fourth Division
16	Watford (R)	46	13	16	17	59	77	0.766	42	Relegation to the Fourth Division
17	Shrewsbury Town (R)	46	15	10	21	49	71	0.690	40	Relegation to the Fourth Division
18	Aldershot (R)	46	12	16	18	59	89	0.663	40	Relegation to the Fourth Division
19	Coventry City (R)	46	13	13	20	61	81	0.753	39	Relegation to the Fourth Division
20	Walsall (R)	46	14	9	23	61	75	0.813	37	Relegation to the Fourth Division
21	Torquay United (R)	46	11	13	22	49	74	0.662	35	Relegation to the Fourth Division
22	Gillingham (R)	46	13	9	24	52	81	0.642	35	Relegation to the Fourth Division
23	Millwall (R)	46	11	9	26	63	91	0.692	31	Re-elected to the Fourth Division
24	Exeter City (R)	46	11	9	26	57	99	0.576	31	Re-elected to the Fourth Division

(C) Champions; (P) Promoted; (R) Relegated

=== Top goalscorers ===
First Division

- Bobby Smith (Tottenham Hotspur) – 36 goals

Second Division

- Tommy Johnston (Leyton Orient / Blackburn Rovers) – 43 goals

Third Division North

- Alf Ackerman (Carlisle United) – 35 goals

Third Division South

- Derek Reeves (Southampton) and Sammy McCrory (Southend United) – 31 goals
