= List of Wolverhampton Wanderers F.C. players =

This is a list of notable footballers who have played with Wolverhampton Wanderers F.C.. The aim is for this list to include all players that have played 100 or more senior matches for the club. Other players who are deemed to have played an important role for the club can be included, but the reason for their notability should be included in the 'Notes' column.

For a list of Wolverhampton Wanderers players with a Wikipedia article, see Category:Wolverhampton Wanderers F.C. players, and for the current first-team squad see Wolverhampton Wanderers F.C.#First team squad.

Appearance figures should include total senior appearances and goals, and not only those in the Football League, although wartime games should be excluded.

== Table ==
Position key
GK	Goalkeeper	LB	Left back	LW	Left winger
MF	Midfielder	RB	Right back	RW	Right winger
FW	Forward	CB	Centre back/half	WH	Wing half

Players should be listed according to alphabetical order of surname.

Name	Nationality	Position	Wolves career	Appearances	Goals	Notes
Billy Annis	England	WH	1898–1905	147	1	
Rayan Aït-Nouri	Algeria	LB	2020–	133	10	
Tom Baddeley	England	GK	1896–1907	315	0	
Mike Bailey	England	MF	1966–1976	436	25	
Danny Batth	England	CB	2010–2019	207	16	
Dickie Baugh	England	RB	1886–1896	227	1	
Billy Beats	England	FW	1895–1903	218	73	
Christophe Berra	Scotland	DF	2008–2013	154	0	
George Berry	Wales	CB	1975–1982	160	6	
Alf Bishop	England	CB	1906–1920	382	6	
Joe Blackett	England	FW	1897–1900	103	14	
Willy Boly	Ivory Coast	CB	2017–2022	147	9	
Paul Bradshaw	England	GK	1977–1983	243	0	
Peter Broadbent	England	FW	1951–1965	497	145	
John Brodie	England	FW	1877–1891	65	44	
Sammy Brooks	England	LW	1909–1922	246	53	
Steve Bull	England	FW	1986–1999	561	306	(Note: Record Wolves goalscorer)
Paul Butler	Republic of Ireland	MF	2001–2004	124	3	
Colin Cameron	Scotland	MF	2001–2006	188	25	
Willie Carr	Scotland	MF	1975–1982	289	26	
Eddie Clamp	England	MF	1952–1961	241	25	
Conor Coady	England	CB	2015–2023	317	7	
Ted Collins	England	RB	1907–1915	307	0	
Paul Cook	England	MF	1989–1994	214	21	
Steve Corica	Australia	MF	1996–2000	100	5	
Jody Craddock	England	CB	2003–2011	237	16	
Billy Crook	England	WH	1943–1952	221	3	
Stan Cullis	England	CB	1934–1947	171	0	(Note: Manager of Wolves 1948–1964)
Steve Daley	England	FW	1971–1979	244	43	
Norman Deeley	England	RW	1951–1962	237	75	
Leander Dendoncker	Belgium	MF/CB	2018–2022	154	12	
Robbie Dennison	Northern Ireland	LW	1987–1997	351	49	
Matt Doherty	Republic of Ireland	LB/RB	2010–2020, 2023–	388	33	
Derek Dougan	Northern Ireland	MF	1967–1976	323	123	
Keith Downing	England	MF	1987–1993	228	11	
Kevin Doyle	Republic of Ireland	FW	2009–2015	179	33	
Sylvan Ebanks-Blake	England	FW	2007–2013	193	64	
David Edwards	Wales	MF	2008–2017	306	44	
Rob Edwards	Wales	CB	2004–2008	111	1	
Neil Emblen	England	MF	1994–1997, 1998–2001	235	18	
Mel Eves	England	FW	1977–1984	214	53	
Darren Ferguson	Scotland	MF	1994–1999	117	4	
Malcolm Finlayson	Scotland	GK	1956–1963	203	0	
Ron Flowers	England	MF	1952–1967	512	37	
Kevin Foley	Republic of Ireland	RB	2007–2015	213	6	
Tom Galley	England	FW	1934–1947	204	49	
George Garratly	England	CB	1909–1920	232	6	
Noel George	England	GK	1919–1928	242	0	
Don Goodman	England	FW	1994–1998	154	39	
Andy Gray	Scotland	FW	1979–1983	162	45	
Albert Groves	Wales	CB	1909–1920	217	20	
Johnny Hancocks	England	FW	1946–1955	378	168	
Gerry Harris	England	LB	1954–1966	270	2	
Billy Harrison	England	RW	1907–1920	345	49	
Billy Hartill	England	FW	1928–1935	234	169	
George Hedley	England	FW	1906–1913	214	74	
Wayne Hennessey	Wales	GK	2006–2014	166	0	
James Henry	England	MF	2013–2017	120	22	
Karl Henry	England	MF	2006–2013	272	7	
Kenny Hibbitt	England	MF	1968–1984	574	114	
Emlyn Hughes	England	CB	1979–1981	77	2	
Hee-Chan Hwang	South Korea	FW	2021–	106	22	
Carl Ikeme	Nigeria	GK	2003–2018	207	0	
Paul Ince	England	MF	2002–2006	130	12	
Denis Irwin	Republic of Ireland	LB	2002–2004	85	2	
Matt Jarvis	England	MF	2007–2013	175	21	
Raúl Jiménez	Mexico	FW	2018–2023	164	57	(Note: Wolves' all-time top scorer in the Premier League)
Bryn Jones	Wales	FW	1933–1938	215	57	
Jackery Jones	England	RB	1900–1913	334	16	
Jonny	Spain	DF	2018–2024	134	6	
Diogo Jota	Portugal	FW	2017–2020	131	44	
Albert Kay	England	DF	1921–1932	295	2	
Robbie Keane	Republic of Ireland	FW	1997–1999	84	27	
David Kelly	England	FW	1993–1995	103	36	
Mark Kennedy	Republic of Ireland	LB	2001–2006	187	14	
Andy Keogh	Republic of Ireland	FW	2006–2012	129	23	
Michael Kightly	England	MF	2006–2012	127	24	
Max Kilman	England	CB	2018–2024	151	3	
Peter Knowles	England	FW	1963–1970	191	64	
Joleon Lescott	England	CB	1999–2006	235	13	
Arthur Lowder	England	WH	1882–1891	71	3	(Note: Played in Wolves' first ever FA Cup and Football League matches, and in 1889 FA Cup Final)
Wilf Lowton	England	RB/LB	1929–1934	209	27	
Tommy Lunn	England	GK	1904–1909	129	0	
John McAlle	England	CB	1967–1981	509	3	
Jim McCalliog	Scotland	MF	1969–1974	210	48	
Kevin McDonald	Scotland	MF	2013–2016	126	8	
Kenny Miller	Scotland	FW	2001–2006	196	63	
Jack Miller	England	LW	1895–1905	269	49	
Jack Mitton	England	FW	1923–1927	110	13	
João Moutinho	Portugal	MF	2018–2023	212	5	
Jimmy Mullen	England	RW	1939–1959	486	112	
Frank Munro	Scotland	CB	1968–1977	371	19	
Jimmy Murray	England	FW	1955–1963	299	166	
Kevin Muscat	Australia	DF	1997–2002	201	15	
Andy Mutch	England	FW	1986–1993	338	105	
Lee Naylor	England	LB	1997–2006	334	9	
George Ndah	Nigeria	FW	1999–2006	96	19	
Pedro Neto	Portugal	RW	2019–2024	135	14	
Rúben Neves	Portugal	MF	2017–2023	253	30	
Shaun Newton	England	MF	2001–2005	130	12	
Michael Oakes	England	GK	1999–2006	220	0	
Seyi Olofinjana	Nigeria	MF	2004–2008	147	18	
Geoff Palmer	England	RB	1971–1986	496	15	
Phil Parkes	England	GK	1966–1978	382	0	
Derek Parkin	England	LB	1968–1982	609	10	(Note: Record Wolves appearances)
Rui Patrício	Portugal	GK	2018–2021	125	0	
Roy Pritchard	England	LB/RB	1945–1954	223	0	
Jesse Pye	England	FW	1946–1952	209	95	
Alex Rae	Scotland	MF	2001–2004	119	21	
Dai Richards	Wales	WH	1927–1935	229	5	
John Richards	England	FW	1969–1983	487	194	
Carl Robinson	Wales	MF	1995–2002	165	19	
José Sá	Portugal	GK	2021–	116	0	
Romain Saïss	Morocco	MF/CB	2016–2022	206	15	
Bakary Sako	Mali	FW	2012–2015	124	38	
Nélson Semedo	Portugal	RB	2020–2025	182	3	
Harry Shaw	England	LB/RB	1923–1930	249	0	
Bill Shorthouse	England	CB	1945–1956	376	1	
George Showell	England	RB/CB	1949–1965	218	3	
Bill Slater	England	FW/DF	1952–1963	339	25	
Tom Smalley	England	RB	1931–1938	179	11	
Richard Stearman	England	RB/CB	2008–2015, 2016–2017	254	7	
Mike Stowell	England	GK	1989–2001	448	0	
Eddie Stuart	South Africa	DF	1951–1962	322	1	
Roy Swinbourne	England	FW	1948–1955	230	114	
Andy Thompson	England	LB	1986–1997	451	45	
Bobby Thomson	England	LB	1961–1969	300	3	
Adama Traoré	Spain	RW/LW	2018–2023	200	14	
Mark Venus	England	LB/CB	1988–1997	338	10	
Dave Wagstaffe	England	LW	1964–1976	404	32	
Stephen Ward	Republic of Ireland	LB	2007–2013	239	9	
Ted Watson	England	CB	1921–1929	206	4	
Dennis Westcott	England	FW	1937–1948	144	124	(Note: Most League goals in a season (38))
Terry Wharton	England	RW	1957–1967	242	79	
Bert Williams	England	GK	1945–1957	420	0	
Dennis Wilshaw	England	FW	1944–1957	219	113	
Harry Wood	England	FW	1887–1898	289	126	
David Woodfield	England	CB	1959–1970	276	15	
Billy Wooldridge	England	FW	1889–1911	356	90	
Billy Wright	England	DF	1939–1959	541	16	(Note: Most international caps whilst playing for Wolves)
