= 1953–54 Wolverhampton Wanderers F.C. season =

English football club season

Wolverhampton Wanderers
1953–54 season
- Chairman: Jimmy Baker
- Manager: Stan Cullis
- First Division: | First Division | 1st (1st title)
- FA Cup: 3rd Round
- Top goalscorer: League: Dennis Wilshaw (25); All: Dennis Wilshaw (26)
- Highest home attendance: 56,590 (vs West Bromwich, 14 November 1953)
- Lowest home attendance: 19,617 (vs Bolton Wanderers, 23 March 1954)
- Average home league attendance: 36,340 (league only)
Home colours	Third colours

The 1953–54 season was the 55th season of competitive league football in the history of English football club Wolverhampton Wanderers. They played in the First Division, then the highest level of English football.

The season was a major success as the team won the League championship for the first time in their history, pipping local rivals West Bromwich Albion. Winning the title was a breakthrough for the club after three times previously finishing runners-up.

== Season review ==
After an opening day mauling away at Burnley, the team found its feet and enjoyed a run of five successive wins to reach second place. The table was led by their Black Country rivals West Bromwich Albion. Both teams kept up a relentless pace before Christmas, with Wolves producing a run that brought 31 points out of a possible 36, including defeating West Brom 1–0. At the halfway mark only Burnley and newly promoted Huddersfield Town were managing to keep pace with the top two.

Defeat in their Christmas fixture against Aston Villa lost Wolves the top spot they had gained for the first time a week earlier. The start of 1954 brought an instant exit from the FA Cup at the hands of fellow Midlanders Birmingham City, but also saw them return to the top of the table. A run of three defeats in four though – including the end of their 11-game unbeaten away record (a club record) – allowed West Brom to regain top spot.

While March saw Wolves suffer further defeats, their main rival's form proved even worse. A second Black Country derby victory for Wolves against them in early April brought them level on points at the summit, second only on goal average with only five games remaining. Wolves then claimed top spot for the first time since early January the following week after thrashing Charlton 5–0.

The Easter period proved the pivotal twist in the title race. A 4–0 thumping of Huddersfield gave Wolves' goal average a further boost, while West Brom were held to a draw by Aston Villa. As was then traditional, the fixtures were reversed the following day, with decisive results. Although both title chasers lost, West Brom's 1–6 hammering at Villa Park left their goal average far short of Wolves' with just a single game to play.

Only a huge loss for Wolves coupled with a big win for Albion could alter the outcome of the championship on the final day. In the event, neither happened, Albion went down to defeat at Portsmouth, while Wolves' 2–0 victory over Tottenham confirmed their first ever league championship.

== Results ==
=== Football League First Division ===
A total of 22 teams competed in the First Division in the 1953–54 season. Each team would play every other team twice, once at their stadium, and once at the opposition's. Two points were awarded to teams for each win, one point per draw, and none for defeats.

19 August 1953 1	Burnley	4–1	Wolverhampton Wanderers	Burnley
18:30 BST	Shannon 62', 86'; Holden 64'; Pilkington 70'		Swinbourne 2'	Stadium: Turf Moor; Attendance: 32,822; Referee: A. Holland

22 August 1953 2	Manchester City	0–4	Wolverhampton Wanderers	Manchester
15:00 BST			Wilshaw 18'; Slater 36'; Swinbourne 56', 83'	Stadium: Maine Road; Attendance: 22,729; Referee: A. Murdoch

26 August 1953 3	Sunderland	3–2	Wolverhampton Wanderers	Sunderland
18:30 BST	T. Wright 18'; Shackleton 26'; Ford 52'		Hancocks 63' (pen.); Wilshaw 81'	Stadium: Roker Park; Attendance: 57,135; Referee: T. L. Wood

29 August 1953 4	Wolverhampton Wanderers	3–1	Cardiff City	Wolverhampton
15:00 BST	Wilshaw 34'; Mullen 38'; Hancocks 39' (pen.)		Grant 13'	Stadium: Molineux; Attendance: 33,221; Referee: W. H. Clapton

31 August 1953 5	Wolverhampton Wanderers	3–1	Sunderland	Wolverhampton
18:15 BST	Wilshaw 35'; Mullen 68'; Swinbourne 70'		T. Wright 2'	Stadium: Molineux; Attendance: 41,442; Referee: T. L. Wood

5 September 1953 6	Arsenal	2–3	Wolverhampton Wanderers	London
15:00 BST	Roper 25'; Holton 41'		Broadbent 22'; Wilshaw 33'; Hancocks 88'	Stadium: Highbury; Attendance: 60,460; Referee: G. Gibson

7 September 1953 7	Wolverhampton Wanderers	2–1	Liverpool	Wolverhampton
18:00 BST	Swinbourne 44'; Broadbent 88'		Jackson 87'	Stadium: Molineux; Attendance: 35,701; Referee: K. A. Collinge

12 September 1953 8	Wolverhampton Wanderers	4–3	Portsmouth	Wolverhampton
15:00 BST	Wilshaw 2', 3', 37'; Swinbourne 86'		Gordon 7', 48'; Harris 44'	Stadium: Molineux; Attendance: 36,524; Referee: N. C. Taylor

16 September 1953 9	Liverpool	1–1	Wolverhampton Wanderers	Liverpool
17:45 BST	Jones 69'		Wilshaw 40'	Stadium: Anfield; Attendance: 29,848; Referee: K. A. Collinge

19 September 1953 10	Blackpool	0–0	Wolverhampton Wanderers	Blackpool
15:00 BST				Stadium: Bloomfield Road; Attendance: 35,074; Referee: J. V. Sherlock

26 September 1953 11	Wolverhampton Wanderers	8–1	Chelsea	Wolverhampton
15:00 BST	Hancocks 3' (pen.), 31', 54'; Wilshaw 48'; Swinbourne 61', 79'; Broadbent 71'; Mullen 86'		Bentley 76'	Stadium: Molineux; Attendance: 36,134; Referee: J. H. Clough

3 October 1953 12	Sheffield United	3–3	Wolverhampton Wanderers	Sheffield
15:00 BST	Ringstead 19', 48'; Bottom 27'		Hancocks 10'; Wilshaw 31'; Swinbourne 84'	Stadium: Bramall Lane; Attendance: 35,961; Referee: F. S. Flander

10 October 1953 13	Newcastle United	1–2	Wolverhampton Wanderers	Newcastle
15:00 GMT	Mulgrew 7'		Smith 81'; Swinbourne 88'	Stadium: St James' Park; Attendance: 39,913; Referee: F. Thurman

17 October 1953 14	Wolverhampton Wanderers	3–1	Manchester United	Wolverhampton
15:00 GMT	Hancocks 16' (pen.); Broadbent 43'; Swinbourne 72'		Taylor 30'	Stadium: Molineux; Attendance: 40,084; Referee: L. A. Brown

24 October 1953 15	Bolton Wanderers	1–1	Wolverhampton Wanderers	Bolton
15:00 GMT	Moir 44'		Hancocks 26'	Stadium: Burnden Park; Attendance: 40,027; Referee: W. Ratcliffe

31 October 1953 16	Wolverhampton Wanderers	1–0	Preston North End	Wolverhampton
14:45 GMT	Wilshaw 55'			Stadium: Molineux; Attendance: 34,211; Referee: A. W. Luty

7 November 1953 17	Middlesbrough	3–3	Wolverhampton Wanderers	Middlesbrough
14:30 GMT	Fitzsimons 22'; McPherson 56'; Hartnett 73'		Swinbourne 16'; Hancocks 43'; Wilshaw 86'	Stadium: Ayresome Park; Attendance: 24,284; Referee: R. P. Hartley

14 November 1953 18	Wolverhampton Wanderers	1–0	West Bromwich Albion	Wolverhampton
14:30 GMT	Mullen 4'			Stadium: Molineux; Attendance: 56,590; Referee: F. Cowen

21 November 1953 19	Charlton Athletic	0–2	Wolverhampton Wanderers	London
14:15 GMT			Broadbent 24'; Hancocks 54'	Stadium: The Valley; Attendance: 35,595; Referee: A. A. Howlett

28 November 1953 20	Wolverhampton Wanderers	4–1	Sheffield Wednesday	Wolverhampton
14:15 GMT	Wilshaw 12'; Hancocks 40' (pen.); Swinbourne 49', 80'		Woodhead 6'	Stadium: Molineux; Attendance: 35,154; Referee: J. H. Clough

5 December 1953 21	Tottenham Hotspur	2–3	Wolverhampton Wanderers	London
14:15 GMT	Bennett 26'; Duquemin 59'		Wilshaw 53'; Broadbent 54'; Hancocks 78'	Stadium: White Hart Lane; Attendance: 48,164; Referee: S. V. Davis

12 December 1953 22	Wolverhampton Wanderers	1–2	Burnley	Wolverhampton
14:15 GMT	Hancocks 84'		Holden 32', 54'	Stadium: Molineux; Attendance: 35,043; Referee: A. Holland

19 December 1953 23	Wolverhampton Wanderers	3–1	Manchester City	Wolverhampton
14:15 GMT	Hancocks 36' (pen.), 89'; Wilshaw 62'		Davies 26'	Stadium: Molineux; Attendance: 27,606; Referee: A. Murdoch

24 December 1953 24	Wolverhampton Wanderers	1–2	Aston Villa	Wolverhampton
14:15 GMT	Wilshaw 22'		Dixon 55'; McParland 80'	Stadium: Molineux; Attendance: 40,536; Referee: J. McCann

26 December 1953 25	Aston Villa	1–2	Wolverhampton Wanderers	Birmingham
14:15 GMT	Thompson 28'		Hancocks 31'; Wilshaw 88'	Stadium: Villa Park; Attendance: 49,123; Referee: J. McCann

2 January 1954 26	Cardiff City	1–3	Wolverhampton Wanderers	Cardiff
14:30 GMT	Nugent 59'		Swinbourne 20'; Wilshaw 37'; Hancocks 82'	Stadium: Ninian Park; Attendance: 47,113; Referee: W. H. Clapton

16 January 1954 27	Wolverhampton Wanderers	0–2	Arsenal	Wolverhampton
14:45 GMT			Logie 9'; Lishman 85'	Stadium: Molineux; Attendance: 45,974; Referee: G. Gibson

23 January 1954 28	Portsmouth	2–0	Wolverhampton Wanderers	Portsmouth
14:45 GMT	Dickinson 8'; Reid 63'			Stadium: Fratton Park; Attendance: 35,312; Referee: N. C. Taylor

6 February 1954 29	Wolverhampton Wanderers	4–1	Blackpool	Wolverhampton
15:00 GMT	Hancocks 17'; Swinbourne 54', 84', 85'		Stephenson 69'	Stadium: Molineux; Attendance: 27,795; Referee: J. V. Sherlock

13 February 1954 30	Chelsea	4–2	Wolverhampton Wanderers	London
15:00 GMT	Bentley 1', 69'; Parsons 9'; Stubbs 62'		Swinbourne 19'; Wilshaw 64'	Stadium: Stamford Bridge; Attendance: 60,289; Referee: J. H. Clough

20 February 1954 31	Wolverhampton Wanderers	6–1	Sheffield United	Wolverhampton
15:00 GMT	Swinbourne 33', 44'; Hancocks 46', 66'; Broadbent 84'; Wilshaw 89'		Cross 86'	Stadium: Molineux; Attendance: 27,823; Referee: F. S. Fiander

27 February 1954 32	Wolverhampton Wanderers	3–2	Newcastle United	Wolverhampton
15:00 GMT	Broadbent 4'; Wilshaw 20'; Slater 86'		Milburn 80'; Broadis 84'	Stadium: Molineux; Attendance: 38,592; Referee: F. Thurman

6 March 1954 33	Manchester United	1–0	Wolverhampton Wanderers	Manchester
15:00 GMT	Berry 84'			Stadium: Old Trafford; Attendance: 40,774; Referee: A. Brown

20 March 1954 34	Preston North End	0–1	Wolverhampton Wanderers	Preston
15:00 GMT			Wilshaw 80'	Stadium: Deepdale; Attendance: 28,857; Referee: A. W. Luty

24 March 1954 35	Wolverhampton Wanderers	1–1	Bolton Wanderers	Wolverhampton
15:00 GMT	Broadbent 42'		Lofthouse 10'	Stadium: Molineux; Attendance: 19,617; Referee: W. Ratcliffe

27 March 1954 36	Wolverhampton Wanderers	2–4	Middlesbrough	Wolverhampton
15:00 GMT	Broadbent 73', 78'		Watkin 3'; McPherson 12', 88'; Delapenha 34' (pen.)	Stadium: Molineux; Attendance: 29,145; Referee: R. P. Hartley

3 April 1954 37	West Bromwich Albion	0–1	Wolverhampton Wanderers	West Bromwich
15:00 GMT			Swinbourne 58'	Stadium: The Hawthorns; Attendance: 59,669; Referee: F. Cowen

10 April 1954 38	Wolverhampton Wanderers	5–0	Charlton Athletic	Wolverhampton
15:00 GMT	Hancocks 7', 70'; Wilshaw 12'; Mullen 53', 59'			Stadium: Molineux; Attendance: 35,028; Referee: A. A. Howlett

17 April 1954 39	Sheffield Wednesday	0–0	Wolverhampton Wanderers	Sheffield
15:00 BST				Stadium: Hillsborough; Attendance: 40,707; Referee: J. H. Clough

19 April 1954 40	Wolverhampton Wanderers	4–0	Huddersfield Town	Wolverhampton
15:00 BST	Mullen 2'; Hancocks 34'; Broadbent 86'; Wilshaw 89'			Stadium: Molineux; Attendance: 42,862; Referee: W. J. Gaiger

20 April 1954 41	Huddersfield Town	2–1	Wolverhampton Wanderers	Huddersfield
15:00 BST	Glazzard 4'; McGarry 63'		Wilshaw 43'	Stadium: Leeds Road; Attendance: 35,814; Referee: W. J. Gaiger

24 April 1954 42	Wolverhampton Wanderers	2–0	Tottenham Hotspur	Wolverhampton
15:00 BST	Swinbourne 18', 68'			Stadium: Molineux; Attendance: 44,055; Referee: S. V. Davis

Final table

Pos	Club	Pld	W	D	L	F	A	GA	Pts
1	Wolverhampton Wanderers	42	25	7	10	96	56	1.714	57
2	West Bromwich Albion	42	22	9	11	86	63	1.365	53
3	Huddersfield Town	42	20	11	11	78	61	1.279	51

Results by round

Round	1	2	3	4	5	6	7	8	9	10	11	12	13	14	15	16	17	18	19	20	21	22	23	24	25	26	27	28	29	30	31	32	33	34	35	36	37	38	39	40	41	42
Result	L	W	L	W	W	W	W	W	D	D	W	D	W	W	D	W	D	W	W	W	W	L	W	L	W	W	L	L	W	L	W	W	L	W	D	L	W	W	D	W	L	W
Position	15	12	15	9	5	4	3	2	2	3	3	3	2	2	3	2	2	2	2	2	1	2	1	1	1	1	2	2	2	2	2	2	2	2	2	2	2	1	1	1	1	1

W = Win; D = Draw; L = Loss

=== FA Cup ===
As a First Division team, Wolves entered the competition at the third round stage. The draw for this round was made on 14 December 1953.

9 January 1954 R3	Wolverhampton Wanderers	1–2	Birmingham City	Wolverhampton
14:15 GMT	Wilshaw		Murphy; Rowley	Stadium: Molineux; Attendance: 36,784

== Players ==
Pos.	Nationality	Player	Football League	FA Cup	Total	Goal
1	England	Nigel Sims	8	1	9	0
2	England	Jack Short	26	1	27	0
3	England	Roy Pritchard	27	1	28	0
4	England	Bill Slater	39	1	40	2
5	England	Bill Shorthouse	40	1	41	0
6	England	Billy Wright (c)	39	1	40	0
7	England	Johnny Hancocks	42	1	43	24
8	England	Ronnie Stockin	6	0	6	0
9	England	Roy Swinbourne	40	1	41	24
10	England	Dennis Wilshaw	39	1	40	26
11	England	Jimmy Mullen	38	1	39	7
12	England	Peter Broadbent	36	1	37	12
13	England	Bert Williams	34	0	34	0
14	England	Len Gibbons	1	0	1	0
15	England	Norman Deeley	6	0	6	0
16	England	Ray Chatham	1	0	1	0
17	Scotland	Bill Baxter	5	0	5	0
18	England	Ron Flowers	15	0	15	0
19	England	Les Smith	4	0	4	1
20	England	Bill Gutteridge	2	0	2	0
21	South Africa	Eddie Stuart	12	0	12	0
22	England	Eddie Clamp	2	0	2	0

=== Top scorer ===
P.	Nationality	Player	Position	Football League	FA Cup	Total
1	England	Dennis Wilshaw	Forward	25	1	26
2	England	Johnny Hancocks	Forward	24	0	24
3	England	Roy Swinbourne	Forward	24	0	24
4	England	Peter Broadbent	Midfielder	12	0	12
5	England	Jimmy Mullen	Midfielder	7	0	7

=== Most appearances ===
P.	Nationality	Player	Position	Football League	FA Cup	Total
1	England	Johnny Hancocks	Forward	42	1	43
2	England	Bill Shorthouse	Defender	40	1	41
3	England	Roy Swinbourne	Forward	40	1	41
4	England	Bill Slater	Defender	39	1	40
5	England	Dennis Wilshaw	Forward	39	1	40

== Transfers ==
=== In ===
Date	Player	From
November 1953	(Scotland) Bill Baxter	Aston Villa

=== Out ===
Date	Player	To
January 1954	(England) Ray Chatham	Notts County
