= 1954–55 Wolverhampton Wanderers F.C. season =

English football club season

Wolverhampton Wanderers
1954–55 season
- Chairman: Jimmy Baker
- Manager: Stan Cullis
- First Division: 2nd
- FA Cup: Quarter-finals
- FA Charity Shield: Shared
- Top goalscorer: League: Johnny Hancocks (26); All: Johnny Hancocks (28)
- Highest home attendance: 55,374 (vs West Brom, 23 October 1954)
- Lowest home attendance: 27,524 (vs Burnley, 6 November 1954)
- Average home league attendance: 36,476 (league only)
Home colours

The 1954–55 season was the 56th season of competitive league football in the history of English football club Wolverhampton Wanderers. They played in the First Division, then the highest level of English football, for a 17th consecutive year.

They entered the season as the defending league champions but were denied a second consecutive title by Chelsea, who finished four points ahead of them.

== Results ==
=== Final League Table ===
Pos	Club	Pld	W	D	L	F	A	GA	Pts
1	Chelsea	42	20	12	10	81	57	1.421	52
2	Wolverhampton Wanderers	42	19	10	13	89	70	1.271	48
3	Portsmouth	42	18	12	12	74	62	1.194	48

Pld = Matches played; W = Matches won; D = Matches drawn; L = Matches lost; F = Goals for; A = Goals against; GA = Goal average; Pts = Points

=== FA Cup ===
Date	Round	Opponent	Venue	Result	Attendance	Scorers
8 January 1955	R3	Grimsby Town	Blundell Park	5–2	26,144	Wilshaw 2, McDonald, Smith, Swinbourne
29 January 1955	R4	Arsenal	Molineux Stadium	1–0	52,857	Swinbourne
19 February 1955	R5	Charlton Athletic	Molineux Stadium	4–1	49,236	Wilshaw 3, Hancocks
12 March 1955	QF	Sunderland	Roker Park	0–2	54,851	

=== FA Charity Shield ===
Date	Opponent	Venue	Result	Attendance	Scorers
9 September 1954	West Bromwich Albion	Molineux Stadium	4–4	45,035	Swinbourne 2, Deeley, Hancocks

== Players Used ==
Pos.	Nationality	Player	Football League	FA Cup	FA Charity Shield	Total	Goal
1	England	Bert Williams				0
2	South Africa	Eddie Stuart				0
3	England	Roy Pritchard				0
4	England	Bill Slater (footballer)				0
5	England	Bill Shorthouse				0
6	England	Billy Wright (Captain)				0
7	England	Johnny Hancocks				0
8	England	Peter Broadbent				0
9	England	Roy Swinbourne				0
10	England	Dennis Wilshaw				0
11	England	Jimmy Mullen				0
12	[[|]]	[[ ]]				0
13	[[|]]	[[ ]]				0
14	[[|]]	[[ ]]				0
15	[[|]]	[[ ]]				0
16	[[|]]	[[ ]]				0
17	[[|]]	[[ ]]				0
18	[[|]]	[[ ]]				0
19	[[|]]	[[ ]]				0
20	[[|]]	[[ ]]				0
21	[[|]]	[[ ]]				0
22	[[|]]	[[ ]]				0
23	[[|]]	[[ ]]				0

Bert Williams 39 4 1 44 Billy Wright 39 4 0 43 Peter Broadbent 38 4 1 43 Dennis Wilshaw 28 4 1 43 Bill Slater 38 4 0 42 Ron Flowers 37 4 1 42 Bill Shorthouse 36 4 1 41 Roy Swinbourne 36 4 1 41 Les Smith 34 4 0 38 Eddie Stuart 33 4 0 37 Johnny Hancocks 32 3 1 36 Jimmy Mullen 17 0 0 17 Eddie Clamp 10 0 1 11 George Showell 8 0 0 8 Norman Deeley 7 0 1 8 Roy Pritchard 7 0 0 7 Colin Booth 3 0 0 3 Nigel Sims 3 0 0 3 Jack Taylor 3 0 0 3 Peter Russell 2 0 1 3 Tommy McDonald 1 1 0 2 Joe Baillie 1 0 0 1 Bill Gutterirdge 0 0 1 1
