= Wolverhampton Wanderers F.C. v Budapest Honvéd FC =

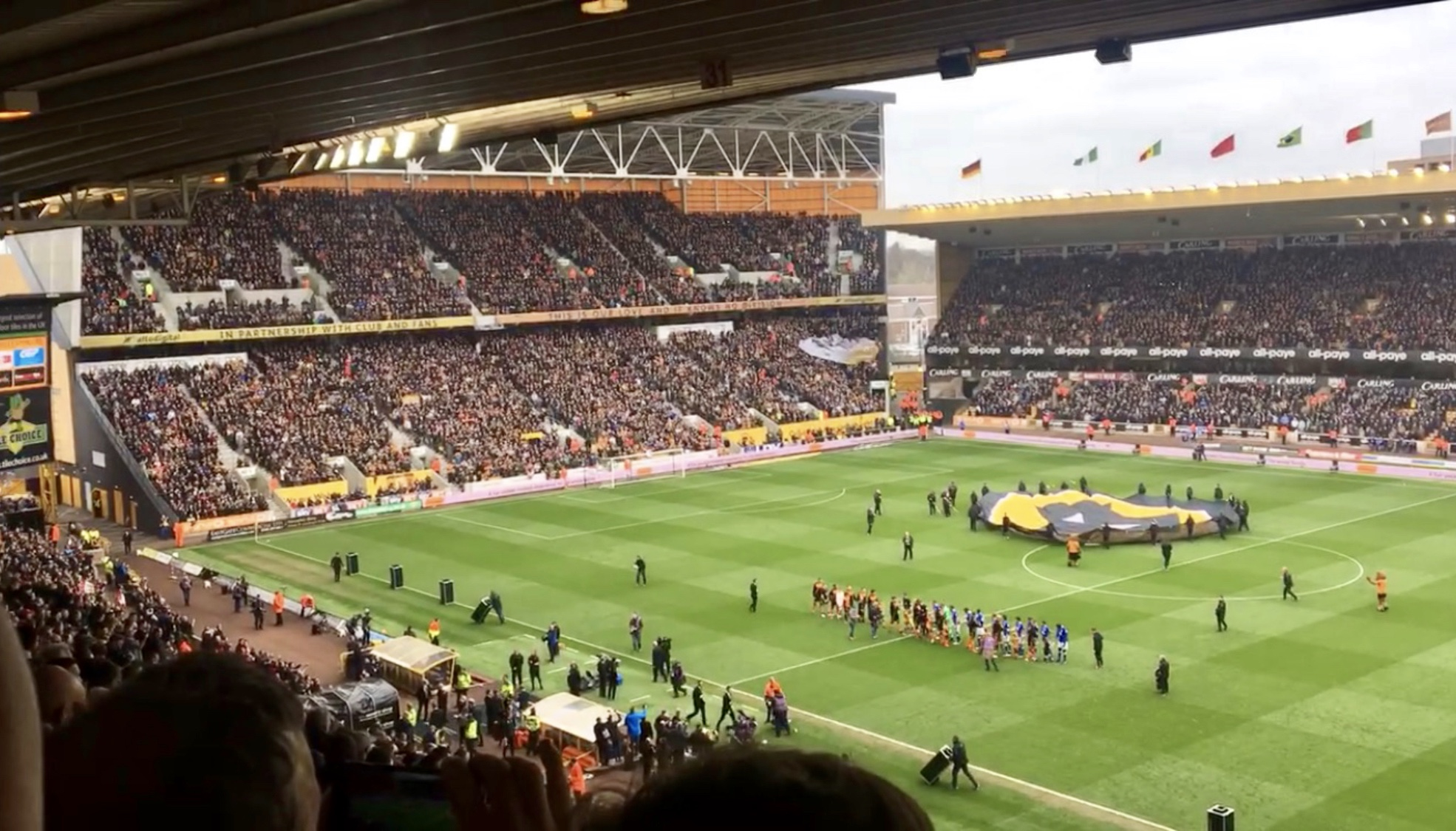
- Molineux Stadium, the venue of the game, pictured in 2018
Wolverhampton Wanderers	Budapest Honvéd
(England)	(Hungary)
3	2
- Date: 13 December 1954
- Venue: Molineux, Wolverhampton
- Referee: Reg Leafe (Nottinghamshire)
- Attendance: 55,000
- Weather: Rainy

Wolverhampton Wanderers F.C. v Budapest Honvéd FC was an association football match that took place on 13 December 1954, and was instrumental in the eventual formation of the European Cup. The match was played under floodlights, and was broadcast live on BBC television.

== Background ==
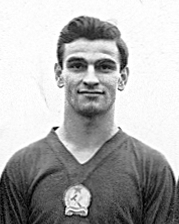
Honvéd striker Sándor Kocsis in 1953

The game occurred little over a year after England national football team had lost 6–3 to Hungary at Wembley Stadium, and six months after the even bigger 7–1 victory for Hungary in Budapest.

At the time, Wolverhampton Wanderers were the champions of England, having won their first ever championship in the 1953–54 season, and were top of the league by one point in the 1954–55 season. Managed by Stan Cullis and captained by England captain Billy Wright, Wolverhampton scored 96 goals as they won the title four points clear of rivals West Bromwich Albion, with Dennis Wilshaw, Johnny Hancocks, and Roy Swinbourne all scoring over 20 goals each.

Budapest Honvéd were the champions of Hungary, having won their fourth championship in the 1954 season whilst scoring 100 goals in the process, including a 9–7 victory over Vörös Lobogó whom they eventually finished five points clear of in winning the league. Managed by Jenő Kalmár, Honvéd contained many players of the famous Mighty Magyars who won the gold medal at the 1952 Olympics, the 1948–53 Central European Cup and finished as runners-up in the 1954 World Cup; Gyula Grosics, Gyula Lóránt, László Budai, József Bozsik, Zoltán Czibor, as well as Ferenc Puskás and Sándor Kocsis, who scored 54 goals between them in their title winning season.

Wolverhampton had faced a number of foreign opposition under the new £30,000 Molineux floodlights in the 14 months before playing Honvéd; a South Africa national team were defeated 3–1, Scottish team Celtic lost 2–0, Argentine team Racing Club were beaten 3–1, before Austrian team First Vienna became the only team in the series to avoid defeat, drawing 0–0. Wolverhampton rebounded with a 10–0 win against Israeli team Maccabi Tel Aviv, followed by a high-profile 4–0 victory over Spartak Moscow, with all goals coming in the final 10 minutes.

== Match ==
=== Summary ===
Wolverhampton struggled in the opening stages to control Budapest Honvéd's "deceptive, constantly changing tactics", which ranged from attacking via the wings, to hitting the ball long, then changing to short passing, with Wolverhampton goalkeeper Bert Williams withstanding the pressure. Honvéd were 2–0 in front after 14 minutes; first, Sándor Kocsis headed in a Ferenc Puskás free-kick given for a foul by Ron Flowers, and the second came after a ball played down the right wing found Kocsis, who played in Ferenc Machos for a "cleverly placed shot". Wolverhampton had a series of chances through Flowers, Dennis Wilshaw, Peter Broadbent, Roy Swinbourne, and Les Smith, but Honvéd goalkeeper Lajos Faragó was able to keep the ball out.

At half-time, Wolverhampton manager Stan Cullis requested club staff and apprentices, including Ron Atkinson, to water the pitch in an attempt to make the pitch boggy so Honvéd would be unable to play their "delightful" football. After being fouled by János Kovács, Johnny Hancocks scored a penalty four minutes after half-time to make the score 2–1. Wolverhampton's "incessant pressure" was beginning to pay off, when Swinbourne scored a two-minute double salvo to win the game for Wolverhampton; he scored a header in the 76th minute, and in the 78th provided the finish to a well-worked move, with both assists coming from Wilshaw. Atkinson thought Cullis' half-time instructions not only helped Wolverhampton's long-ball tactics work, but scuppered Honvéd's momentum and stopped a possible 10–0 thrashing.

=== Details ===
13 December 1954

Wolverhampton Wanderers	3–2	Budapest Honvéd
Hancocks 49' (pen.); Swinbourne 76', 78'	Report Page 12	Kocsis 10'; Machos 14'

Molineux, Wolverhampton
Attendance: 55,000
Referee: Reg Leafe

Wolverhampton Wanderers	Budapest Honvéd

GK	1	(England) Bert Williams
RB	2	(Union of South Africa) Eddie Stuart
LB	3	(England) Bill Shorthouse
RH	4	(England) Bill Slater
CH	5	(England) Billy Wright (c)
LH	6	(England) Ron Flowers
OR	7	(England) Johnny Hancocks
IR	8	(England) Peter Broadbent
CF	9	(England) Roy Swinbourne
IL	10	(England) Dennis Wilshaw
OL	11	(England) Les Smith
Manager:
(England) Stan Cullis

GK	1	(Hungary) Lajos Faragó
RB	2	(Hungary) Tibor Palicskó
LB	3	(Hungary) János Kovács
RH	4	(Hungary) József Bozsik
CH	5	(Hungary) Gyula Lóránt
LH	6	(Hungary) Nándor Bányai
OR	7	(Hungary) László Budai
IR	8	(Hungary) Sándor Kocsis
CF	9	(Hungary) Ferenc Machos	Substituted off
IL	10	(Hungary) Ferenc Puskás
OL	11	(Hungary) Zoltán Czibor
Substitutes:
CF	12	(Hungary) Lajos Tichy	Substituted on
Manager:
(Hungary) Jenő Kalmár

== Post-match and aftermath ==
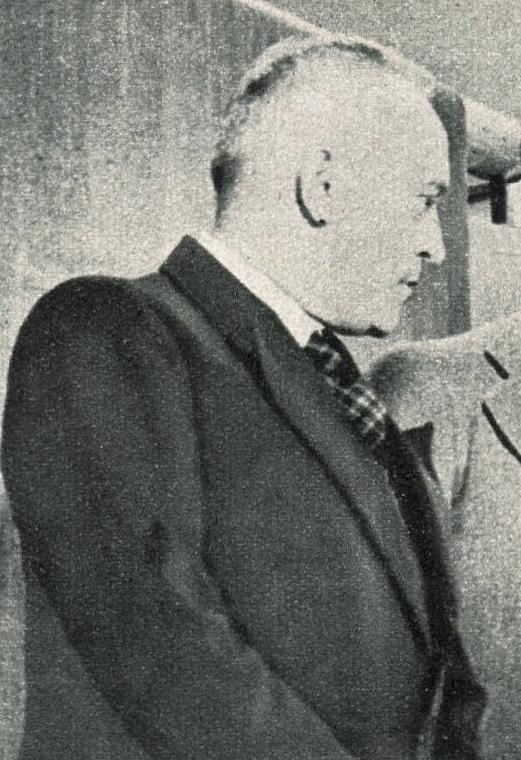
French journalist Gabriel Hanot helped organise the first-ever European Cup following the match.

Wolverhampton goalscorer Roy Swinbourne said afterwards that "Wolves never played a match in which there was so much pride involved", while his manager Stan Cullis and sections of the English press declared his team as "champions of the world", and that Wolves had proven that English football was "the genuine, original, unbeatable article... still the best of its kind in the world", statements which journalist Willy Meisl disagreed with, calling the Molineux pitch a "quagmire", and citing a recent Honvéd defeat to Crvena Zvezda. Another journalist, Gabriel Hanot, also disagreed with the viewpoint put forth, claiming that Wolverhampton were inferior to Spanish team Real Madrid and Italian team A.C. Milan, suggesting "a European championship be organised between clubs" to give clubs the opportunity to prove they were the greatest.

Writing in L'Équipe a few days later, Hanot's colleague Jacques de Ryswick wrote a proposal of the format of a tournament to crown such a team. The following year, the first-ever European Cup began, although it was the eventual 1954–55 First Division champions Chelsea rather than Wolverhampton who were invited to represent England. Chelsea withdrew at the behest of the Football League, which feared that midweek European ties would adversely affect attendances in domestic fixtures. Cullis himself said of the prospect of live televised football against continental teams that the "whole future of football in Britain depends on our ability to face the challenge from abroad" and "although I am in a minority I am sure we would be wise to have more games screened live. Television offers an opportunity not seen in all soccer's history, a whole new source of revenue, a vast sum which must make a considerable impact on the game".

Wolves played two low key friendlies with Honved home and away in 1962 and 1963 respectively. The two teams met for a fourth time in December 1993 in a match to celebrate the opening of the three redeveloped stands at Molineux. Ferenc Puskás and Billy Wright were in attendance on a night that was filled with nostalgia. A sign of the respect that Wright and Puskas had for each other was obvious to all who were there.

Following the death of Wolves' legendary manager Stan Cullis in 2001, club figure Peter Creed said that Cullis had made them "the most famous club in the world during the 1950s", while The FA said "the famous 'floodlit friendlies' against sides such as Honvéd of Hungary are ingrained in the traditions of English football".
