= 1955–56 in Scottish football =

Division One champions
- Rangers

Division Two champions
- Queen's Park

Scottish Cup winners
- Heart of Midlothian

League Cup winners
- Aberdeen

Junior Cup winners
- Petershill

Teams in Europe
- Hibernian

Scotland national team
- 1956 BHC

The 1955–56 season was the 83rd season of competitive football in Scotland and the 59th season of the Scottish Football League.

== Overview ==
Following league reconstruction, the top tier was expanded from 16 to 18 teams with Airdrieonians and Dunfermline Athletic being promoted. The second tier was expanded from 16 to 19 teams with Berwick Rangers, Dumbarton, East Stirlingshire, Montrose and Stranraer joining the league from the third tier.

The leagues were rebranded at the start of season 1955–56. Division A was now the newly named Division One and Division B was now the newly named Division Two. Division C was disbanded, with most of its members, which were reserve teams, moving to a separate Scottish (Reserve) League).

== Scottish League Division One ==
| Pos | Team | Pld | W | D | L | GF | GA | GR | Pts |
|---|---|---|---|---|---|---|---|---|---|
| 1 | Rangers | 34 | 22 | 8 | 4 | 85 | 27 | 3.148 | 52 |
| 2 | Aberdeen | 34 | 18 | 10 | 6 | 87 | 50 | 1.740 | 46 |
| 3 | Heart of Midlothian | 34 | 19 | 7 | 8 | 99 | 47 | 2.106 | 45 |
| 4 | Hibernian | 34 | 19 | 7 | 8 | 86 | 50 | 1.720 | 45 |
| 5 | Celtic | 34 | 16 | 9 | 9 | 55 | 39 | 1.410 | 41 |
| 6 | Queen of the South | 34 | 16 | 5 | 13 | 69 | 73 | 0.945 | 37 |
| 7 | Airdrieonians | 34 | 14 | 8 | 12 | 85 | 96 | 0.885 | 36 |
| 8 | Kilmarnock | 34 | 12 | 10 | 12 | 52 | 45 | 1.156 | 34 |
| 9 | Partick Thistle | 34 | 13 | 7 | 14 | 62 | 60 | 1.033 | 33 |
| 10 | Motherwell | 34 | 11 | 11 | 12 | 53 | 59 | 0.898 | 33 |
| 11 | Raith Rovers | 34 | 12 | 9 | 13 | 58 | 75 | 0.773 | 33 |
| 12 | East Fife | 34 | 13 | 5 | 16 | 61 | 69 | 0.884 | 31 |
| 13 | Dundee | 34 | 12 | 6 | 16 | 56 | 65 | 0.862 | 30 |
| 14 | Falkirk | 34 | 11 | 6 | 17 | 58 | 75 | 0.773 | 28 |
| 15 | St Mirren | 34 | 10 | 7 | 17 | 57 | 70 | 0.814 | 27 |
| 16 | Dunfermline Athletic | 34 | 10 | 6 | 18 | 42 | 82 | 0.512 | 26 |
| 17 | Clyde | 34 | 8 | 6 | 20 | 50 | 74 | 0.676 | 22 |
| 18 | Stirling Albion | 34 | 4 | 5 | 25 | 23 | 82 | 0.280 | 13 |

Source: RSSSF

Champions: Rangers
Relegated: Clyde, Stirling Albion

== Scottish League Division Two ==
| Pos | Team | Pld | W | D | L | GF | GA | GD | Pts | Promotion or relegation |
|---|---|---|---|---|---|---|---|---|---|---|
| 1 | Queen's Park | 36 | 23 | 8 | 5 | 78 | 28 | +50 | 54 | Promotion to the 1956–57 Division One |
| 2 | Ayr United | 36 | 24 | 3 | 9 | 103 | 55 | +48 | 51 | Promotion to the 1956–57 Division One |
| 3 | St Johnstone | 36 | 21 | 7 | 8 | 86 | 45 | +41 | 49 | |
| 4 | Dumbarton | 36 | 21 | 5 | 10 | 83 | 62 | +21 | 47 | |
| 5 | Stenhousemuir | 36 | 20 | 4 | 12 | 82 | 54 | +28 | 44 | |
| 6 | Brechin City | 36 | 18 | 6 | 12 | 60 | 56 | +4 | 42 | |
| 7 | Cowdenbeath | 36 | 16 | 7 | 13 | 80 | 85 | −5 | 39 | |
| 8 | Dundee United | 36 | 12 | 14 | 10 | 78 | 65 | +13 | 38 | |
| 9 | Morton | 36 | 15 | 6 | 15 | 71 | 69 | +2 | 36 | |
| 10 | Third Lanark | 36 | 16 | 3 | 17 | 80 | 64 | +16 | 35 | |
| 11 | Hamilton Academical | 36 | 13 | 7 | 16 | 86 | 84 | +2 | 33 | |
| 12 | Stranraer | 36 | 14 | 5 | 17 | 77 | 92 | −15 | 33 | |
| 13 | Alloa Athletic | 36 | 12 | 7 | 17 | 67 | 73 | −6 | 31 | |
| 14 | Berwick Rangers | 36 | 11 | 9 | 16 | 52 | 77 | −25 | 31 | |
| 15 | Forfar Athletic | 36 | 10 | 9 | 17 | 62 | 75 | −13 | 29 | |
| 16 | East Stirlingshire | 36 | 9 | 10 | 17 | 66 | 94 | −28 | 28 | |
| 17 | Albion Rovers | 36 | 8 | 11 | 17 | 58 | 82 | −24 | 27 | |
| 18 | Arbroath | 36 | 10 | 6 | 20 | 47 | 67 | −20 | 26 | |
| 19 | Montrose | 36 | 4 | 3 | 29 | 44 | 133 | −89 | 11 | |

Source: "1955-1956 Second Division - SPFL Archive". SPFL.

Promoted: Queen's Park, Ayr United

== Cup honours ==
| Competition | Winner | Score | Runner-up |
|---|---|---|---|
| Scottish Cup 1955–56 | Heart of Midlothian | 3 – 1 | Celtic |
| League Cup 1955–56 | Aberdeen | 2 – 1 | St Mirren |
| Junior Cup | Petershill | 4 – 1 | Lugar Boswell Thistle |

== Other Honours ==
=== County ===
| Competition | Winner | Score | Runner-up |
|---|---|---|---|
| Aberdeenshire Cup | Fraserburgh | | |
| Ayrshire Cup | Kilmarnock | 7 – 0 * | Ayr United |
| East of Scotland Shield | Hearts | 2 – 1 | Hibernian |
| Fife Cup | Raith Rovers | 2 – 1 | East Fife |
| Forfarshire Cup | Dundee | 2 – 0 | Arbroath |
| Glasgow Cup | Celtic | 5 – 3 † | Rangers |
| Lanarkshire Cup | Motherwell | 7 – 1 | Albion Rovers |
| Renfrewshire Cup | Morton | | |
| Stirlingshire Cup | Alloa Athletic | 8 – 4 * | Falkirk |

^{*} - aggregate over two legs
† - replay

=== Highland League ===
Top Three
| Pos | Team | Pld | W | D | L | GF | GA | GD | Pts |
|---|---|---|---|---|---|---|---|---|---|
| 1 | Elgin City (Note: won on play off) | 28 | 22 | 1 | 5 | 92 | 44 | +48 | 45 |
| 2 | Buckie Thistle | 28 | 22 | 1 | 5 | 94 | 34 | +60 | 45 |
| 3 | Inverness Thistle | 27 | 18 | 2 | 7 | 108 | 52 | +56 | 38 |

== Scotland national team ==
| Date | Venue | Opponents | Score | Competition | Scotland scorer(s) |
|---|---|---|---|---|---|
| 8 October 1955 | Windsor Park, Belfast (A) | Northern Ireland | 1–2 | BHC | Lawrie Reilly |
| 9 November 1955 | Hampden Park, Glasgow (H) | Wales | 2–0 | BHC | Bobby Johnstone (2) |
| 14 April 1956 | Hampden Park, Glasgow (H) | England | 1–1 | BHC | Graham Leggat |
| 2 May 1956 | Hampden Park, Glasgow (H) | Austria | 1–1 | Friendly | Alfie Conn |

1956 British Home Championship - Joint winners with England, Northern Ireland and Wales

Key:

- (H) = Home match
- (A) = Away match
- BHC = British Home Championship
