= Roy Pritchard =

English footballer

Personal information
- Full name: Roy Thomas Pritchard
- Date of birth: 9 May 1925
- Place of birth: Dawley, Telford, England
- Date of death: January 1993 (aged 67)
- Place of death: Willenhall, England
- Position: Full back

Youth career
- Dawley Council School
- Dawley & District Schools
- 1941–1945: Wolverhampton Wanderers

Senior career*
Years	Team	Apps	(Gls)
1945–1955	Wolverhampton Wanderers	202	(0)
1955–1957	Aston Villa	3	(0)
1957–1958	Notts County	18	(0)
1958–1960	Port Vale	24	(0)
- Wellington Town
Total		247+	(0+)
- * Club domestic league appearances and goals

Roy Thomas Pritchard (9 May 1925 – January 1993) was an English footballer who played 247 league games at full back in the Football League for Wolverhampton Wanderers, Aston Villa, Notts County, and Port Vale. He also played war-time football for Wolves, Mansfield Town, Notts County, Swindon Town and Walsall, and later played Southern League football for Wellington Town. He won the Fourth Division title with Port Vale in 1958–59 and won both the FA Cup with Wolves in 1949, as well as the First Division title in 1953–54.

== Career ==
Pritchard joined local side Wolverhampton Wanderers straight from school in 1941. The suspension of league football due to World War II delayed the official start of his Wolves career. However, it allowed him to play as a guest for Mansfield Town, Notts County, Swindon Town and Walsall. He finally made his First Division debut after the resumption of the Football League on 12 October 1946, in a 6–1 thrashing of Huddersfield Town at Molineux. This was one of just four starts under the stewardship of Ted Vizard during the 1946–47 season. Under the management of Stan Cullis, Pritchard became a regular fixture at full-back in the Wolves side over the next seven seasons. They reached fifth and sixth in the league in the 1947–48 and 1948–49 seasons, though their great success was to come in the FA Cup. Pritchard helped the team to battle through the 1948–49 FA Cup campaign, beating Chesterfield, Sheffield United, Liverpool, West Bromwich Albion and Manchester United (in a semi-final replay) to reach the 1949 FA Cup final. He played all ninety minutes at Wembley, as Wolves defeated Leicester City 3–1. Wolves then came second in the league in the 1949–50 season, as Portsmouth's superior goal average proved decisive. They dropped to 14th place in 1950–51, but did manage to reach the semi-finals of the FA Cup. A 16th-place finish in 1951–52 was then followed by a third-place finish in 1952–53. He played 27 league games in the 1953–54 season, as Wolves won their first league title with a four-point lead over Midlands rivals West Bromwich Albion. They came close to retaining their title in the 1954–55 campaign, as Chelsea won the title by four points; Pritchard featured just seven times and also missed the 1954 FA Charity Shield, as a defensive reshuffle saw him out of favour.

In February 1955, Pritchard switched clubs to fellow Midland rivals Aston Villa. His career at Villa Park never got going, and he only played three times for their first-team over a two-and-a-half-year stay. Eric Houghton's "Villans" finished sixth in 1954–55, though only avoided relegation in 1955–56 on goal average. They rose to tenth in 1955–56 and won the FA Cup, though Pritchard did not feature in the final. He moved on to Notts County in November 1957, and played out the remainder of the 1957–58 season at Meadow Lane, featuring in 18 Second Division games as Tommy Lawton's side were relegated in last place. Pritchard joined Port Vale in the close season and played 18 league games as the "Valiants" won the Fourth Division title in 1958–59. He played just six Third Division games in the 1959–60 campaign, after which manager Norman Low allowed him to leave Vale Park on a free transfer. In May 1960, he joined Southern League side Wellington Town and remained at the club until his retirement.

== Career statistics ==
Appearances and goals by club, season and competition
Club	Season	League			FA Cup		Total	
Club	Season	Division	Apps	Goals	Apps	Goals	Apps	Goals
Wolverhampton Wanderers	1946–47	First Division	4	0	0	0	4	0
Wolverhampton Wanderers	1947–48	First Division	20	0	0	0	20	0
Wolverhampton Wanderers	1948–49	First Division	30	0	6	0	36	0
Wolverhampton Wanderers	1949–50	First Division	26	0	6	0	32	0
Wolverhampton Wanderers	1950–51	First Division	29	0	7	0	36	0
Wolverhampton Wanderers	1951–52	First Division	19	0	0	0	19	0
Wolverhampton Wanderers	1952–53	First Division	40	0	1	0	41	0
Wolverhampton Wanderers	1953–54	First Division	27	0	1	0	28	0
Wolverhampton Wanderers	1954–55	First Division	7	0	0	0	7	0
Wolverhampton Wanderers	Total		202	0	21	0	223	0
Aston Villa	1955–56	First Division	1	0	0	0	1	0
Aston Villa	1956–57	First Division	1	0	0	0	1	0
Aston Villa	1957–58	First Division	1	0	0	0	1	0
Aston Villa	Total		3	0	0	0	3	0
Notts County	1957–58	Second Division	18	0	1	1	19	1
Port Vale	1958–59	Fourth Division	18	0	0	0	18	0
Port Vale	1959–60	Third Division	6	0	0	0	6	0
Port Vale	Total		24	0	0	0	24	0
Career total			247	0	22	1	269	1

== Honours ==
Wolverhampton Wanderers

- Football League First Division: 1953–54
- FA Cup: 1948–49

Port Vale

- Football League Fourth Division: 1958–59
