= Bert Williams Leisure Centre =

Leisure centre in Bilston, England

Coordinates: 52.56293°N 2.077725°W

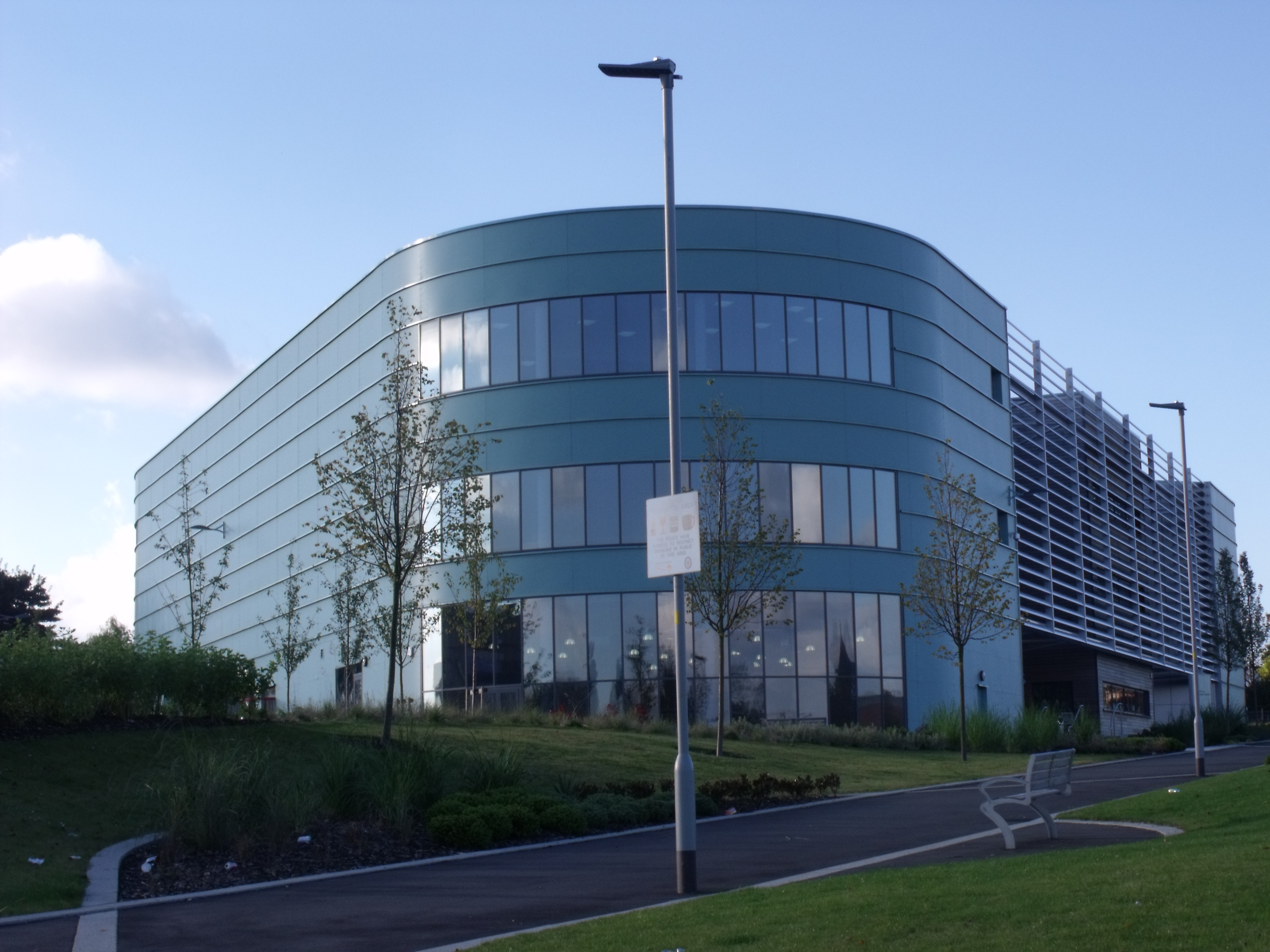
Bert Williams Leisure Centre, Bilston, West Midlands

The Bert Williams Leisure Centre is a leisure centre in Bilston in the West Midlands, England, was named after the Wolves and England footballer Bert Williams. It was opened on 3 December 2011 by Wolverhamptons City's mayor Bert Turner with the ceremony attended by Bert Williams himself. The building was constructed to replace the existing swimming baths in Prouds Lane, Bilston which was opened on 27 July 1964.

The facility cost £18.6 million.

== Facilities offered ==
The leisure centre offers the following facilities:

- Swimming, (both a main pool and studio pool). Swimming is free to under 16's.
- Sports hall
- Four squash courts
- Sauna
- Gym
- Youth gym
