= Dennis Wilshaw =

English footballer

Personal information
- Full name: Dennis James Wilshaw
- Date of birth: 11 March 1926
- Place of birth: Stoke-on-Trent, Staffordshire, England
- Date of death: 10 May 2004 (aged 78)
- Place of death: Newcastle-under-Lyme, Staffordshire
- Height: 5 ft 9 1/4 in (1.76 m)
- Position: Forward

Youth career
- Packmoor Boys' Club

Senior career*
Years	Team	Apps	(Gls)
1944–1957	Wolverhampton Wanderers	211	(106)
1946–1948	→ Walsall (loan)	74	(27)
1957–1961	Stoke City	95	(41)
Total		380	(174)

International career
1949	England B	1	(2)
1953–1956	England	12	(10)
- * Club domestic league appearances and goals

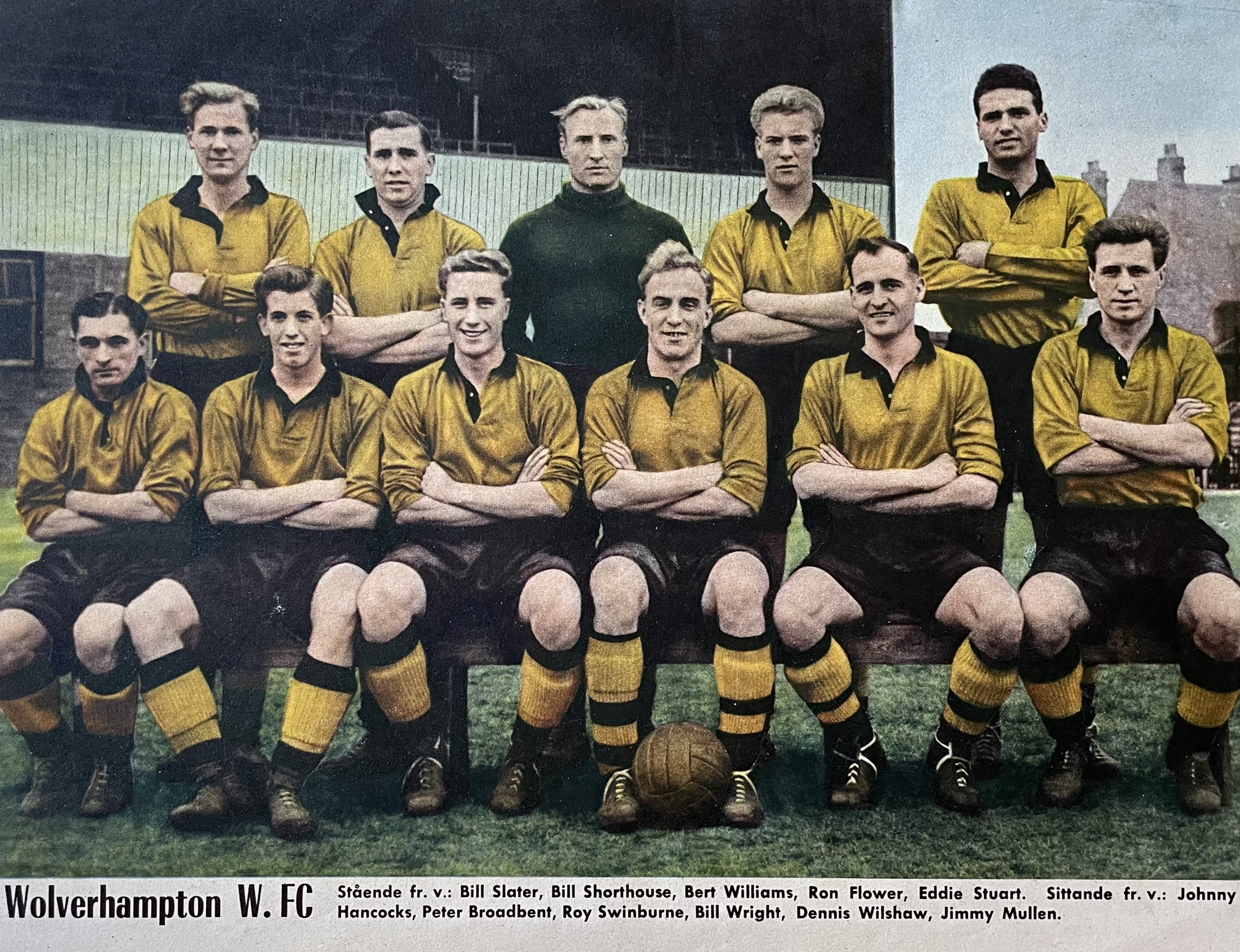
Wolverhampton Wanderers F.C. at 1955 with following players, from left standing: Bill Slater, Bill Shorthouse, Bert Williams, Ron Flowers, Eddie Stuart; front row: Johnny Hancocks, Peter Broadbent, Roy Swinbourne, Billy Wright (captain), Dennis Wilshaw and Jimmy Mullen.

Dennis James Wilshaw (11 March 1926 – 10 May 2004) was an English international footballer. A forward, he scored 173 goals in 380 appearances in the Football League, and also scored ten goals in twelve appearances for the England national team (including one goal in the 1954 FIFA World Cup and four goals against Scotland at Wembley). He spent 13 years with Wolverhampton Wanderers from 1944 to 1957, where he won the First Division title in 1953–54. He spent 1946 to 1948 on loan at Walsall, and ended his career after playing for Stoke City between 1957 and 1961.

== Early and personal life ==
Dennis James Wilshaw was born on 11 March 1926 in Stoke-on-Trent, Staffordshire to John Thomas, a light lorry driver, and Daisy (née Mollart). He married Mary Chester in 1948. After retiring as a player, Wilshaw stayed with Stoke City as a scout and also became a qualified FA coach and sports psychologist. He also took up his old career as a schoolteacher and eventually became head of a school in his native Stoke. Later he joined the Social and Community Studies department at Crewe and Alsager College of Education. He died of a heart attack on 10 May 2004 in Newcastle-under-Lyme, Staffordshire. His funeral took place at Newcastle Crematorium.

== Club career ==
Wilshaw joined Wolverhampton Wanderers in March 1944 after being spotted playing for Packmoor Boys' Club in his youth, where he scored ten goals in a 16–0 win. The war made guesting a common occurrence. So he played a game for Port Vale on 5 May 1945, a 6–0 Potteries derby thumping at the Victoria Ground. He began guesting at Harry Hibbs's Walsall. He had an extended loan spell at the Third Division South side, making 82 appearances and scoring 31 goals, before returning to top flight Wolves in September 1948. He built an effective partnership with Doug Lishman. He also continued his education to become a qualified teacher during this time. He finished as the "Saddlers" top-scorer in 1946–47 with 21 goals in 39 games. He hit nine goals in 40 appearances in 1947–48, and also appeared at Fellows Park in the first few games of the 1948–49 campaign.

He made his Wolves debut on 12 March 1949, scoring a hat-trick over Newcastle United, and went on to score ten goals in eleven league games that season. However, he was not selected for the side that competed in the 1949 FA Cup final against Leicester City at Wembley. Wolves finished second in the league in 1949–50. However, they struggled in the lower half of the table in 1950–51 and 1951–52.

Thanks to greats such as Jesse Pye and Roy Swinbourne, it took until the 1952–53 for Wilshaw to establish himself in the first-team; he bagged 18 goals in 30 games that season. He was a part of the Wolves side that won the league in 1953–54. The club's top-scorer with 25 of Wolves' 96 league goals that season, he described the players poor relationship with manager Stan Cullis, claiming that the club's team spirit was good "because we all hated his guts". They came close to securing the title again in 1954–55, but instead finished four points behind Chelsea. Wilshaw became more of a squad member in the 1955–56 and 1956–57 campaigns, playing 46 games across both seasons. In his time, Wolves were one of the greatest teams in the world, and he played in victories over Spartak Moscow, Dynamo Moscow, Valencia, Honvéd and Real Madrid. In his time at Molineux, he managed a total of 117 goals in 232 matches for the club.

In 1957, the striker was transferred to Second Division Stoke City for a £10,000 fee. He claimed nine goals in 24 games for the "Potters" in 1957–58, including a hat-trick against Middlesbrough in a third round FA Cup tie at the Victoria Ground on 25 January. He became the club's top-scorer with 18 goals in 33 appearances in 1958–59, including another third round FA Cup hat-trick, this time against Oldham Athletic. He was restricted to nine goals in 22 games in 1959–60, though he got a third hat-trick in a league win over Lincoln City. He went on to claim 14 goals in 30 appearances in 1960–61, holding on to his first-team place after manager Frank Taylor was replaced by Tony Waddington. He retired from professional football in 1961 after breaking a leg in a FA Cup tie against Newcastle United.

== International career ==
Wilshaw earned 12 caps for England, five of which were friendlies and seven were competitive fixtures. He scored twice on his debut on 10 October 1953 against Wales, in a 4–1 British Home Championship victory at Ninian Park.

His next game was in the 1954 FIFA World Cup, where he scored a goal against the hosts Switzerland in a 2–0 win at the Wankdorf Stadium. He also appeared in the competition's quarter-finals, as England lost 4–2 to Uruguay.

His fourth cap was in the 1955 British Home Championship, in which he bagged four goals in a 7–2 win over Scotland at Wembley – this remains both the only occasion an opposing player has scored four times in a match against Scotland and the highest individual goal tally for either team in the then-annual fixture. It was the 18th instance of an England player scoring at least four in a match.

After caps against France, Spain, Portugal and Wales, both his eighth and ninth goals came against Northern Ireland in a 3–0 win. His final goal came against Finland in Helsinki on 20 May 1956 in a 3–0 victory. Following a friendly against West Germany, he made his final international appearance at Windsor Park, in a 1–1 draw with Northern Ireland in the 1957 British Home Championship.

== Style of play ==
Brian Glanville described him as: "Slim but strong, at 5 ft 10 in and 10 st 7 lb, Wilshaw was quick and direct, with a powerful shot... Essentially left-footed but effortlessly versatile, Wilshaw could play with equal success at outside-left, inside-left, or even centre-forward."

Another journalist, Ivan Ponting, wrote that: "Wilshaw was strong, resilient and direct, an awkward customer for any opponent to control, and thus was perfectly suited to Stan Cullis's formidable all-action Wolves side... He was capable of sudden bursts of searing acceleration, which equipped him ideally to exploit gaps in opposition defences. His shooting was explosively powerful, especially with his left foot, and he was combative in the air."

== Career statistics ==
=== Club ===
Appearances and goals by club, season and competition
Club	Season	League			FA Cup		Charity Shield		Total	
Club	Season	Division	Apps	Goals	Apps	Goals	Apps	Goals	Apps	Goals
Walsall	1946–47	Third Division South	35	18	4	3	—		39	21
Walsall	1947–48	Third Division South	36	8	4	1	—		40	9
Walsall	1948–49	Third Division South	3	1	0	0	—		3	1
Walsall	Total		74	27	8	4	—		82	31
Wolverhampton Wanderers	1948–49	First Division	11	10	0	0	—		11	10
Wolverhampton Wanderers	1949–50	First Division	8	3	0	0	—		8	3
Wolverhampton Wanderers	1950–51	First Division	14	5	1	0	—		15	5
Wolverhampton Wanderers	1951–52	First Division	14	5	0	0	—		14	5
Wolverhampton Wanderers	1952–53	First Division	29	17	1	1	—		30	18
Wolverhampton Wanderers	1953–54	First Division	39	26	1	1	—		40	27
Wolverhampton Wanderers	1954–55	First Division	38	20	4	5	1	0	43	25
Wolverhampton Wanderers	1955–56	First Division	26	6	0	0	—		26	6
Wolverhampton Wanderers	1956–57	First Division	20	10	0	0	—		20	10
Wolverhampton Wanderers	1957–58	First Division	12	4	0	0	—		12	4
Wolverhampton Wanderers	Total		211	106	7	7	1	0	219	113
Stoke City	1957–58	Second Division	19	6	5	3	—		24	9
Stoke City	1958–59	Second Division	31	15	2	3	—		33	18
Stoke City	1959–60	Second Division	21	9	1	0	—		22	9
Stoke City	1960–61	Second Division	24	11	6	3	—		30	14
Stoke City	Total		95	41	14	9	—		109	50
Career total			380	174	29	20	1	0	410	194

=== International ===
Appearances and goals by national team and year
National team	Year	Apps	Goals
England	1953	1	2
England	1954	2	1
England	1955	6	6
England	1956	3	1
Total		12	10

Scores and results list England's goal tally first, score column indicates score after each Wilshaw goal.

List of international goals scored by Dennis Wilshaw
No.	Date	Venue	Opponent	Score	Result	Competition	Ref.
1	10 October 1953	Ninian Park, Cardiff, Wales	Wales	1–1	4–1	1953–54 British Home Championship	
2	10 October 1953	Ninian Park, Cardiff, Wales	Wales	2–1	4–1	1953–54 British Home Championship	
3	20 June 1954	Wankdorf Stadium, Bern, Switzerland	Switzerland	2–0	2–0	1954 FIFA World Cup qualification	
4	2 April 1955	Wembley Stadium, London, England	Scotland	1–0	7–2	1954–55 British Home Championship	
5	2 April 1955	Wembley Stadium, London, England	Scotland	5–1	7–2	1954–55 British Home Championship	
6	2 April 1955	Wembley Stadium, London, England	Scotland	6–1	7–2	1954–55 British Home Championship	
7	2 April 1955	Wembley Stadium, London, England	Scotland	7–1	7–2	1954–55 British Home Championship	
8	2 November 1955	Wembley Stadium, London, England	Northern Ireland	–	3–0	1955–56 British Home Championship	
9	2 November 1955	Wembley Stadium, London, England	Northern Ireland	–	3–0	1955–56 British Home Championship	
10	20 May 1956	Olympic Stadium, Helsinki, Finland	Finland	–	5–1	Friendly	

== Honours ==
Wolverhampton Wanderers

- Football League First Division: 1953–54; runner-up: 1949–50, 1954–55

England

- British Home Championship: 1953–54, 1954–55, 1955–56 (shared), 1956–57
