= Ray Chatham =

English footballer

Personal information
- Date of birth: 20 July 1924
- Place of birth: Wolverhampton, England
- Date of death: 1999 (aged 74–75)
- Position: Defender

Senior career*
Years	Team	Apps	(Gls)
1946–1953	Wolverhampton Wanderers	76	(0)
1953–1959	Notts County	127	(4)
- Margate
Total		203	(4)
- * Club domestic league appearances and goals

Ray Chatham (20 July 1924 – 1999) was an English footballer who played in the Football League for Notts County and Wolverhampton Wanderers.
