= Albert Kay =

English footballer (1895–1975)

Personal information
- Full name: Albert Edward Kay
- Date of birth: 22 November 1895
- Place of birth: Sheffield, England
- Date of death: 1975 (aged 79–80)
- Place of death: Wolverhampton, England
- Height: 5 ft 11 in (1.80 m)
- Position: Defender

Senior career*
Years	Team	Apps	(Gls)
- Tinsley
1919–1920	Birmingham	0	(0)
1920–1921	Willenhall		
1921–1932	Wolverhampton Wanderers	278	(2)
- * Club domestic league appearances and goals

Albert Edward Kay (22 November 1895 – 1975) was an English footballer who made almost 300 appearances for Wolverhampton Wanderers.

== Career ==
Kay spent fifteen months at Birmingham between June 1919 and November 1920.

After a short spell at Willenhall, he joined Wolverhampton Wanderers in Summer 1921, making his club debut on 2 September 1922 in a 1–1 draw at Derby County. The team were relegated to the Third Division in his first season, but made an immediate return as champions.

The defender made 295 appearances for the club in total over 10 years, before retiring due to injury in 1932, shortly after the club were promoted to the top flight.

== Honours ==
Wolverhampton Wanderers

- Second Division: 1931–32
- Third Division: 1923–24
