= 1955–56 British Home Championship =

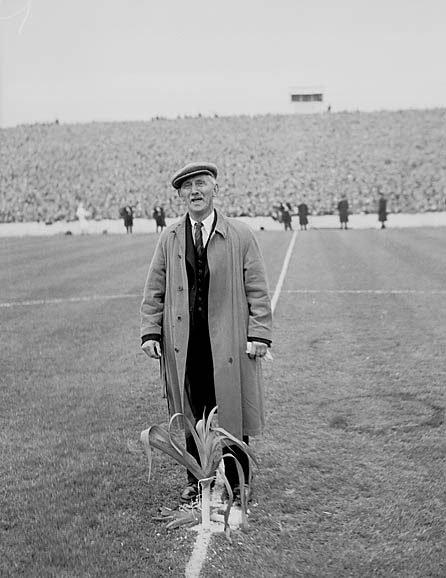
- Supporter with a leek at the Wales–England game, Cardiff, 22 October 1955.

Tournament details
- Host country: England, Ireland, Scotland and Wales
- Dates: 8 October 1955 – 14 April 1956
- Teams: 4

Final positions
- Champions: England; Ireland; Scotland; Wales

Tournament statistics
- Matches played: 6
- Goals scored: 15 (2.5 per match)
- Top scorer(s): (England) Dennis Wilshaw (Scotland) Bobby Johnstone (2 each)

The 1955–56 British Home Championship was a football tournament played during the 1955–56 season between the British Home Nations. It was the only occasion during the hundred-year run of the Home Championship in which all four teams finished level on points. As goal difference was not used to determine position until 1979, all four teams shared the trophy, holding it for three months each. Had goal difference or goal average been used to determine the winner, then England would have won.

The competition began unusually with victories by Wales and Ireland over England and Scotland in their opening matches. This gave added incentive to the favourites in the following matches, which England and Scotland both won easily. Nevertheless, all four teams stood a good chance of victory going into the final round, with both Wales and Ireland seeking a rare undisputed tournament success. However, the teams cancelled each other out, both matches resulting in 1–1 draws leaving all four equal on points and thus sharing the trophy.

== Table ==
Team	Pld	W	D	L	GF	GA	GD	Pts
England (C)	3	1	1	1	5	3	+2	3
Scotland (C)	3	1	1	1	4	3	+1	3
Wales (C)	3	1	1	1	3	4	−1	3
Ireland (C)	3	1	1	1	3	5	−2	3

Rules for classification: 1) points. The points system worked as follows: 2 points for a win and 1 point for a draw.
(C) Co-champions

== Results ==
8 October 1955

Ireland	2 – 1	Scotland
Jackie Blanchflower, Billy Bingham		Lawrie Reilly

Windsor Park, Belfast

22 October 1955

Wales	2 – 1	England
Derek Tapscott, Cliff Jones		Own goal

Ninian Park, Cardiff

2 November 1955

England	3 – 0	Ireland
Dennis Wilshaw 2, Tom Finney

Wembley Stadium, London

9 November 1955

Scotland	2 – 0	Wales
Bobby Johnstone 2

Hampden Park, Glasgow

11 April 1956

Wales	1 – 1	Ireland
Roy Clarke		Jimmy Jones

Ninian Park, Cardiff

14 April 1956

Scotland	1 – 1	England
Graham Leggat (60)		Johnny Haynes (90)

Hampden Park, Glasgow
Attendance: 132,779
