= Les Smith (footballer, born 1927) =

English footballer

Personal information
- Full name: Leslie Joseph Smith
- Date of birth: 24 December 1927
- Place of birth: Halesowen, Worcestershire, England
- Date of death: 8 March 2008 (aged 80)
- Place of death: Stourbridge, West Midlands, England
- Position: Outside right

Senior career*
Years	Team	Apps	(Gls)
1947–1956	Wolverhampton Wanderers	88	(22)
1956–1960	Aston Villa	115	(24)
Total		203	(46)
- * Club domestic league appearances and goals

Leslie Joseph Smith (24 December 1927 – 8 March 2008) was an English footballer who represented both Wolverhampton Wanderers and Aston Villa.

Smith began his professional career with Wolves, making his senior debut in April 1947. He was part of the squad that won the league title in 1953–54, although managing only four appearances during the campaign. He played in the famous Wolves v Honved game, under the first floodlights in England. Where wolves turned around a 2–0 half time score to win 3–2 against the team, which included the great's Puskas and Yashin.

He became a regular starter in the following season, replacing the injured Jimmy Mullen as the club finished as runners-up. However, he found himself largely out of contention upon Mullen's return and so moved to Aston Villa in February 1956 for £25,000.

Smith played for Aston Villa in the 1957 FA Cup Final against Manchester United's Busby Babes, where Villa won the game 2–1 to lift the cup. However his career was cut short after an achilles injury forced him into retirement in 1960. In total, he made 130 appearances, scoring 27 goals for Villa.

Smith died on 8 March 2008, after suffering for many years from throat and bowel cancer. He is survived by his wife Mavis and son Nigel.

== Honours ==
Aston Villa

- FA Cup: 1956–57
