= 1949–50 Wolverhampton Wanderers F.C. season =

English football club season

Wolverhampton Wanderers
1949–50 season
- Manager: Stan Cullis
- First Division: 2nd
- FA Cup: 5th round
- FA Charity Shield: Shared
- Top goalscorer: League: Jesse Pye (18); All: Jesse Pye (18)
- Highest home attendance: 56,661 (vs West Brom, 15 October 1949)
- Lowest home attendance: 30,768 (vs Bolton, 10 December 1949)
- Average home league attendance: 45,346 (league only)
Home colours

The 1949–50 season was the 51st season of competitive league football in the history of English football club Wolverhampton Wanderers. They played in the top tier of the English football system, the Football League First Division. The team finished as runners-up for a third time, losing out on a first league title to Portsmouth by virtue of goal average.

== Results ==
=== Final League Table ===
Pos	Club	Pld	W	D	L	F	A	GA	Pts
1	Portsmouth	42	22	9	11	74	38	1.947	53
2	Wolverhampton Wanderers	42	20	13	9	76	49	1.551	53
3	Sunderland	42	21	10	11	83	62	1.339	52

Pld = Matches played; W = Matches won; D = Matches drawn; L = Matches lost; F = Goals for; A = Goals against; GA = Goal average; Pts = Points

=== First Division ===
Date	Opponent	Venue	Result	Scorers	Attendance
20 August 1949	Fulham (A)	Craven Cottage	W 2–1	Hancocks, Mullen	43,854
24 August 1949	Charlton Athletic (A)	The Valley	W 3–2	Forbes, Pye, Wright	45,078
27 August 1949	Newcastle United (H)	Molineux	W 2–1	Forbes, Pye	50,992
29 August 1949	Charlton Athletic (H)	Molineux	W 2–1	Smyth, Wright	43,267
3 September 1949	Blackpool (A)	Bloomfield Road	W 2–1	Mullen, Smyth	31,940
10 September 1949	Middlesbrough (H)	Molineux	W 3–1	Dunn, Hancocks, Smyth	50,424
14 September 1949	Birmingham City (A)	St Andrews	D 1–1	0.G	46,433
17 September 1949	Everton (A)	Goodison Park	W 2–1	Mullen, Pye	59,593
24 September 1949	Huddersfield Town (H)	Molineux	W 7–1	Pye 3, Forbes 2, Mullen, Smyth	45,559
1 October 1949	Portsmouth (A)	Fratton Park	D 1–1	Pye	50,248
8 October 1949	Derby County	The Baseball Ground	W 2–1	Hancocks, Mullen	37,652
15 October 1949	West Bromwich Albion (H)	Molineux	D 1–1	Pye	56,661
22 October 1949	Manchester United (A)	Old Trafford	L 0–3		51,427
29 October 1949	Chelsea (H)	Molineux	D 2–2	Smyth 2	42,005
5 November 1949	Stoke City (A)	Victoria Ground	L 1–2	Hancocks	40,111
12 November 1949	Burnley (H)	Molineux	D 0–0		40,216
19 November 1949	Sunderland (A)	Roker Park	L 1–3	Forbes	51,487
26 November 1949	Liverpool (H)	Molineux	D 1–1	Wilshaw	52,509
3 December 1949	Arsenal (A)	Highbury	D 1–1	Mullen	59,766
10 December 1949	Bolton Wanderers (H)	Molineux	D 1–1	Wilshaw	30,768
17 December 1949	Fulham (H)	Molineux	D 1–1	Pye	32,399
24 December 1949	Newcastle United (A)	St James' Park	L 0–2		56,048
26 December 1949	Aston Villa (H)	Molineux	L 2–3	Smyth, Swinbourne	51,986
27 December 1949	Aston Villa (A)	Villa Park	W 4–1	Swinbourne 2, Pye, Smith	69,492
31 December 1949	Blackpool (H)	Molineux	W 3–0	Hancocks, Mullen, Pye	51,404
14 January 1950	Middlesbrough (A)	Ayresome Park	L 0–2		30,146
21 January 1950	Everton (H)	Molineux	D 1–1	Wilshaw	36,414
4 February 1950	Huddersfield Town (A)	Leeds Road	L 0–1		16,736
18 February 1950	Portsmouth (H)	Molineux	W 1–0	McLean	46,679
25 February 1950	Derby County (H)	Molineux	W 4–1	Pye 2, Walker 2	43,238
4 March 1950	West Bromwich Albion (A)	The Hawthorns	D 1–1	Hancocks	60,945
11 March 1950	Sunderland (H)	Molineux	L 1–3	Smyth	44,318
18 March 1950	Liverpool (A)	Anfield	W 2–0	Hancocks, Swinbourne	41,126
25 March 1950	Stoke City (H)	Molineux	W 2–1	Hancocks, Swinbourne	38,388
1 April 1950	Burnley (A)	Turf Moor	W 1–0	Walker	36,726
8 April 1950	Manchester United (H)	Molineux	D 1–1	Walker	54,296
10 April 1950	Manchester City (A)	Maine Road	L 1–2	Walker	36,723
11 April 1950	Manchester City (H)	Molineux	W 3–0	Hancocks, Pye, Swinbourne	44,735
15 April 1950	Chelsea (A)	Stamford Bridge	D 0–0		30,254
22 April 1950	Arsenal (H)	Molineux	W 3–0	Walker 2, Pye	53,082
29 April 1950	Bolton Wanderers (A)	Burnden Park	W 4–2	Hancocks, Mullen, Pye, Wright	14,886
6 May 1950	Birmingham City	Molineux	W 6–1	Mullen 2, Pye 2, Swinbourne, Walker	42,935

=== FA Cup ===
Date	Round	Opponent	Venue	Result	Attendance	Scorers
7 January 1950	R3	Plymouth Argyle	Home Park	1–1		
11 January 1950	R3 Replay	Plymouth Argyle	Molineux Stadium	3–0		
28 January 1950	R4	Sheffield United	Molineux Stadium	0–0		
1 February 1950	R4 Replay	Sheffield United	Bramall Lane	4–3		
11 February 1950	R5	Blackpool	Molineux Stadium	0–0		
15 February 1950	R5 Replay	Blackpool	Bloomfield Road	0–1		
