= Ron Flowers =

English footballer (1934–2021)

Ron Flowers MBE
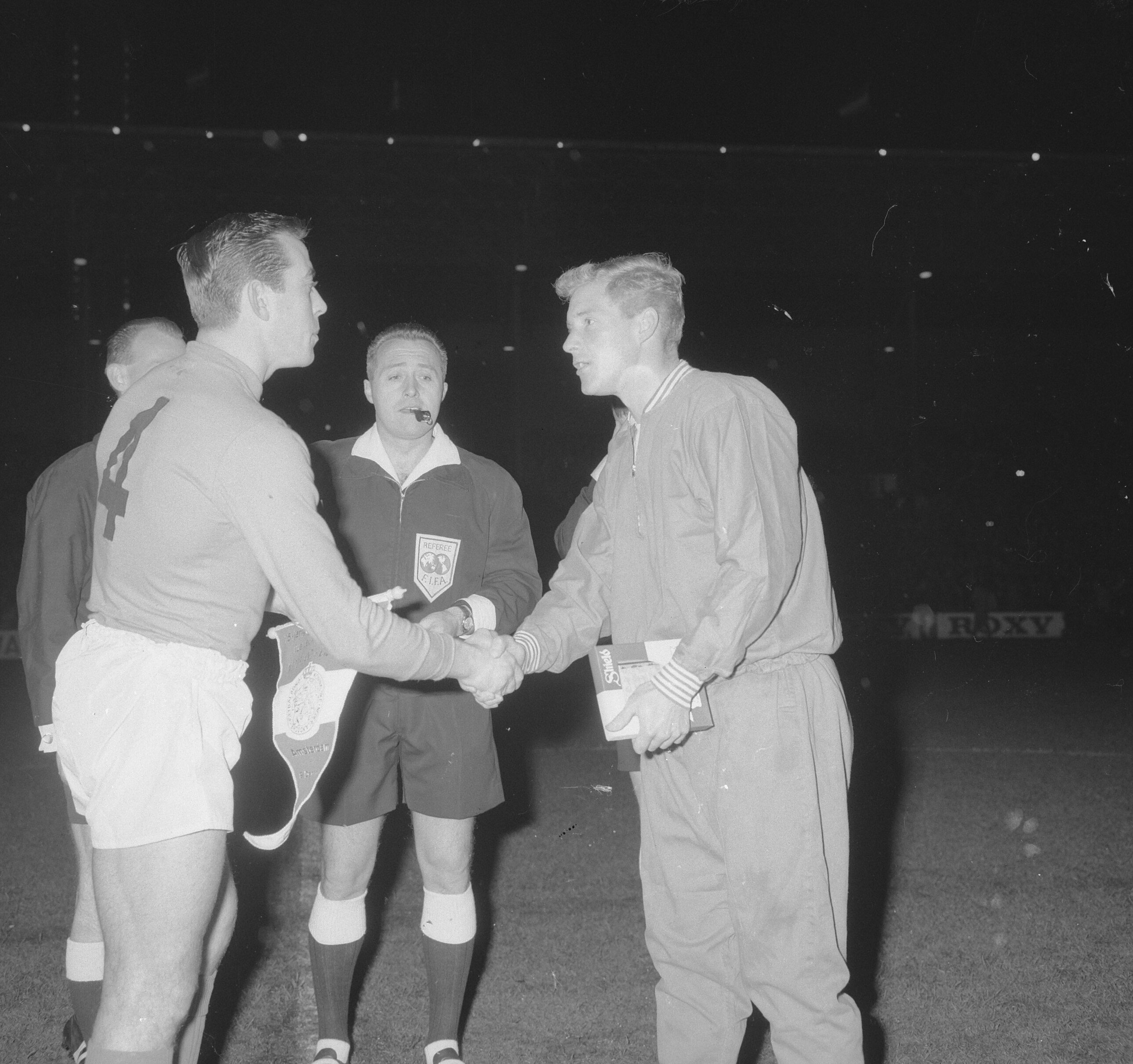
- Flowers (right) in 1964, shaking hands with Daan Schrijvers

Personal information
- Full name: Ronald Flowers
- Date of birth: 28 July 1934
- Place of birth: Edlington, Doncaster, England
- Date of death: 12 November 2021 (aged 87)
- Height: 5 ft 11 in (1.80 m)
- Position: Midfielder

Youth career
- Doncaster Rovers
- 1950–1952: Wath Wanderers

Senior career*
Years	Team	Apps	(Gls)
1952–1967	Wolverhampton Wanderers	467	(33)
1967–1969	Northampton Town	62	(4)
1969–1971	Telford United		
Total		529	(37)

International career
1955	England U23	2	(0)
1955–1966	England	49	(10)

Managerial career
- 1968–1969: Northampton Town (player/manager)
- 1971: Wellington Town (player/manager)
Medal record
Men's football
Representing England
FIFA World Cup
Winner	1966 England
- * Club domestic league appearances and goals

Ronald Flowers MBE (28 July 1934 – 12 November 2021) was an English professional footballer, who played as a midfielder, and was most known for his time at Wolverhampton Wanderers. He was a member of England's victorious 1966 World Cup squad. He was the elder brother of John Flowers.

== Club career ==
Flowers began in the Doncaster Rovers academy, where his father played semi-professionally. Whilst he flourished on the pitch at Belle Vue, he also trained as an apprentice at the Doncaster rail sheds, at his father's insistence that he learn a trade outside of football. He was later released by Doncaster and joined the Wolves' nursery side Wath Wanderers, where he soon came to the attention of the highly successful Wolverhampton Wanderers manager Stan Cullis. Within a year, he was moved down to Molineux and soon broke into the first team, making a scoring debut against Blackpool on 20 September 1952. Prior to this time, he had served in the RAF and became an Aircraftman Second Class.

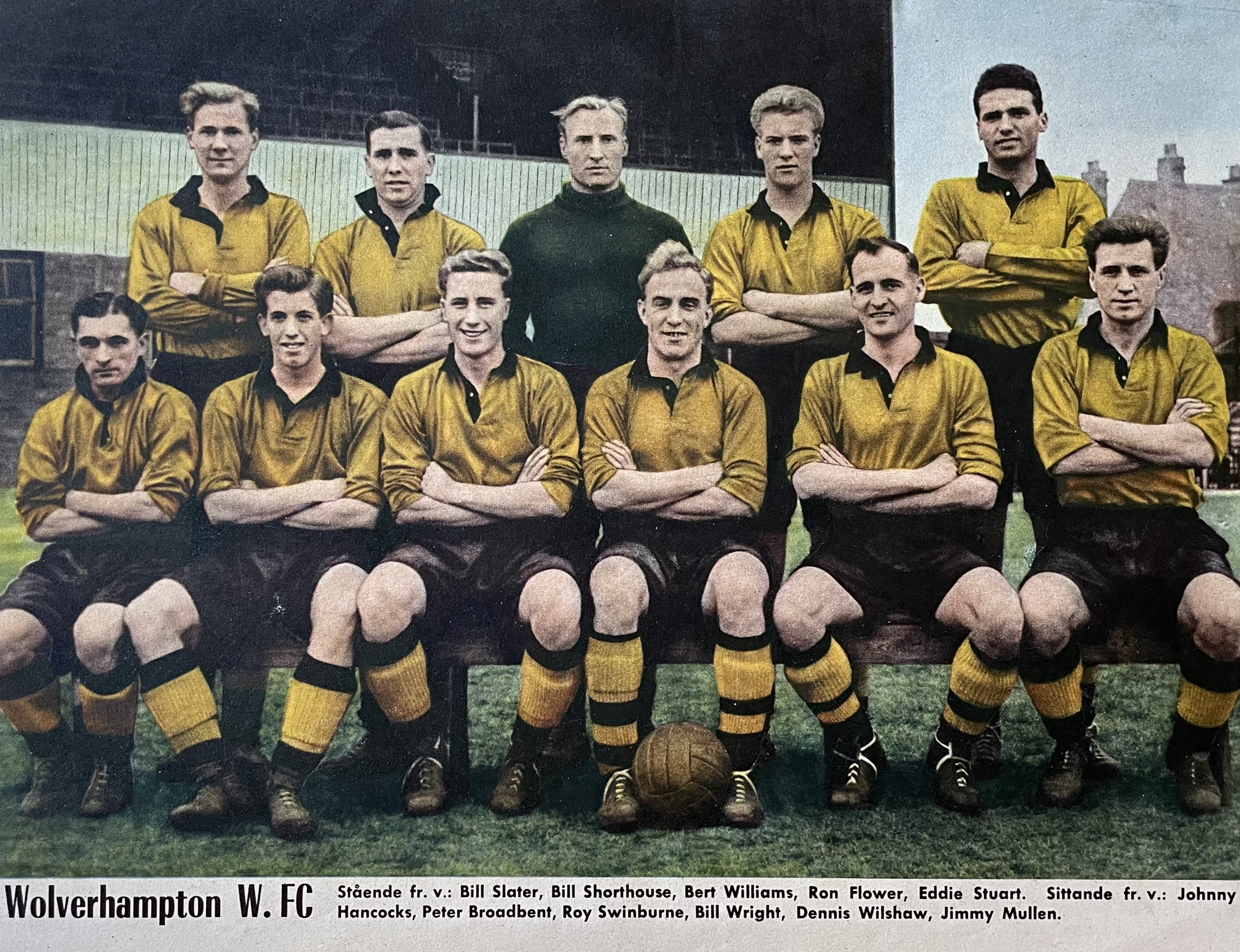
Wolverhampton Wanderers F.C. at 1955 with following players, from left standing: Bill Slater, Bill Shorthouse, Bert Williams, Ron Flowers, Eddie Stuart; front row: Johnny Hancocks, Peter Broadbent, Roy Swinbourne, Billy Wright (captain), Dennis Wilshaw and Jimmy Mullen.

Initially playing as an attacking midfield player (in modern terminology) at Wolverhampton Wanderers, he won three league championships and an FA Cup. After the death of Gerry Harris, he was the last surviving member of the 1960 FA Cup Final team. In total, he made 515 appearances for the club, scoring 37 times. In the latter stages of his career he played a more defensive role.

He left Wolves in September 1967 to join Northampton Town, where he later became player/manager. He ended his playing career at non-league Wellington Town (latterly known as Telford United) as player-manager. Whilst manager there, they won the 1970–71 FA Trophy. After being sacked in 1971, he retired to run a sports shop in Wolverhampton.

== International career ==
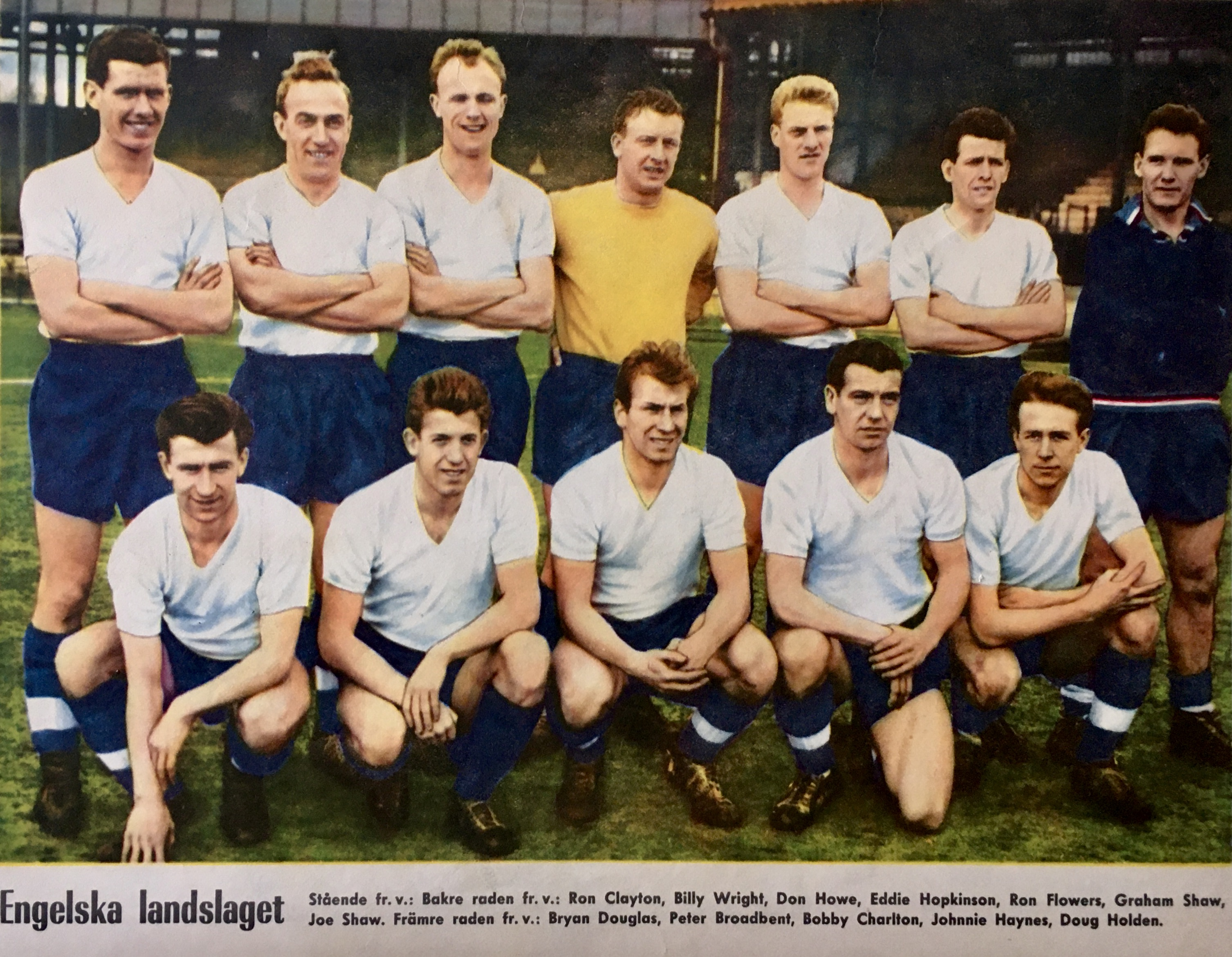
England national football team at Empire Stadium, London, 11 April 1959. From the left, standing: Ronnie Clayton, Billy Wright (captain), Don Howe, Eddie Hopkinson, Ron Flowers, Graham Shaw, Joe Shaw; front row: Bryan Douglas, Peter Broadbent, Bobby Charlton, Johnny Haynes and Doug Holden

Flowers won 49 caps for England and scored ten goals. His international debut came on 15 May 1955 in a 1–0 friendly defeat to France. He went on to appear in the 1962 World Cup and scored two goals from the penalty spot in the first two games of the group stage. From November 1958 (his second international appearance) until April 1963, he appeared in 40 consecutive England international matches; only Billy Wright has appeared in more.

He also has the distinction of scoring England's first goal in a European Football Championships game – in the qualifying round first leg against France at Hillsborough on 3 October 1962. He scored all six penalties that he took for England.

Although his last England cap came before the finals (a friendly win over Norway), he was a member of the squad that won the 1966 World Cup, being the oldest and earliest-capped member of the squad. Flowers narrowly missed out on playing in the final itself. Jack Charlton who was due to play, caught a cold on the eve of the West Germany match. Flowers was approached by his manager, Alf Ramsey, the night before the final and told that if Charlton had not recovered by the morning he was on. After a sleepless night, it turned out that Charlton was fine in the morning and, ultimately, Flowers never kicked a ball at the tournament. In the 1966 World Cup Final only the 11 players on the pitch at the end of the 4–2 win over West Germany received medals. Following a Football Association-led campaign to persuade FIFA to award medals to all the winners' squad members, Flowers was presented with his medal by Prime Minister Gordon Brown at a ceremony at 10 Downing Street on 10 June 2009.

In an article in the England international Official Match-Day Programme for the World Cup qualifying match against Ukraine on 1 April 2009, Flowers was cited as England's best ever penalty taker (shared with Alan Shearer). He converted all six of the penalties he took for England.

== Personal life ==
Flowers' younger brother, John Flowers, and his uncle, George Flowers both played over 100 games professionally for Doncaster Rovers. In March 2017, Flowers' grandson, Harry, was signed by Premier League side Burnley on a contract until June 2018. His sister-in-law is former darts World Champion Maureen Flowers, the wife of his brother John. He had a wife and two sons.

Flowers was appointed Member of the Order of the British Empire (MBE) in the 2021 New Year Honours for services to football.

On 12 November 2021, it was announced that Flowers had died aged 87.

== Honours ==
Wolverhampton Wanderers

- Football League First Division: 1953–54, 1957–58, 1958–59
- FA Cup: 1959–60
- FA Charity Shield: 1954 (shared), 1959, 1960 (shared)
- Football League Second Division runner-up: 1966–67

England

- FIFA World Cup: 1966
