= Johnny Hancocks =

English footballer (1919–1994)

Personal information
- Date of birth: 30 April 1919
- Place of birth: Oakengates, England
- Date of death: 19 February 1994 (aged 74)
- Place of death: Oakengates, England
- Position: Outside right

Youth career
- Wrekin Schools

Senior career*
Years	Team	Apps	(Gls)
- Oakengates Town
1938–1939	Walsall	30	(9)
1946–1957	Wolverhampton Wanderers	343	(158)
1957–1959	Wellington Town		
1960	Cambridge United		
- Oswestry Town

International career
1948–1950	England	3	(2)

Managerial career
- 1957–1959: Wellington Town (player-manager)
- * Club domestic league appearances and goals

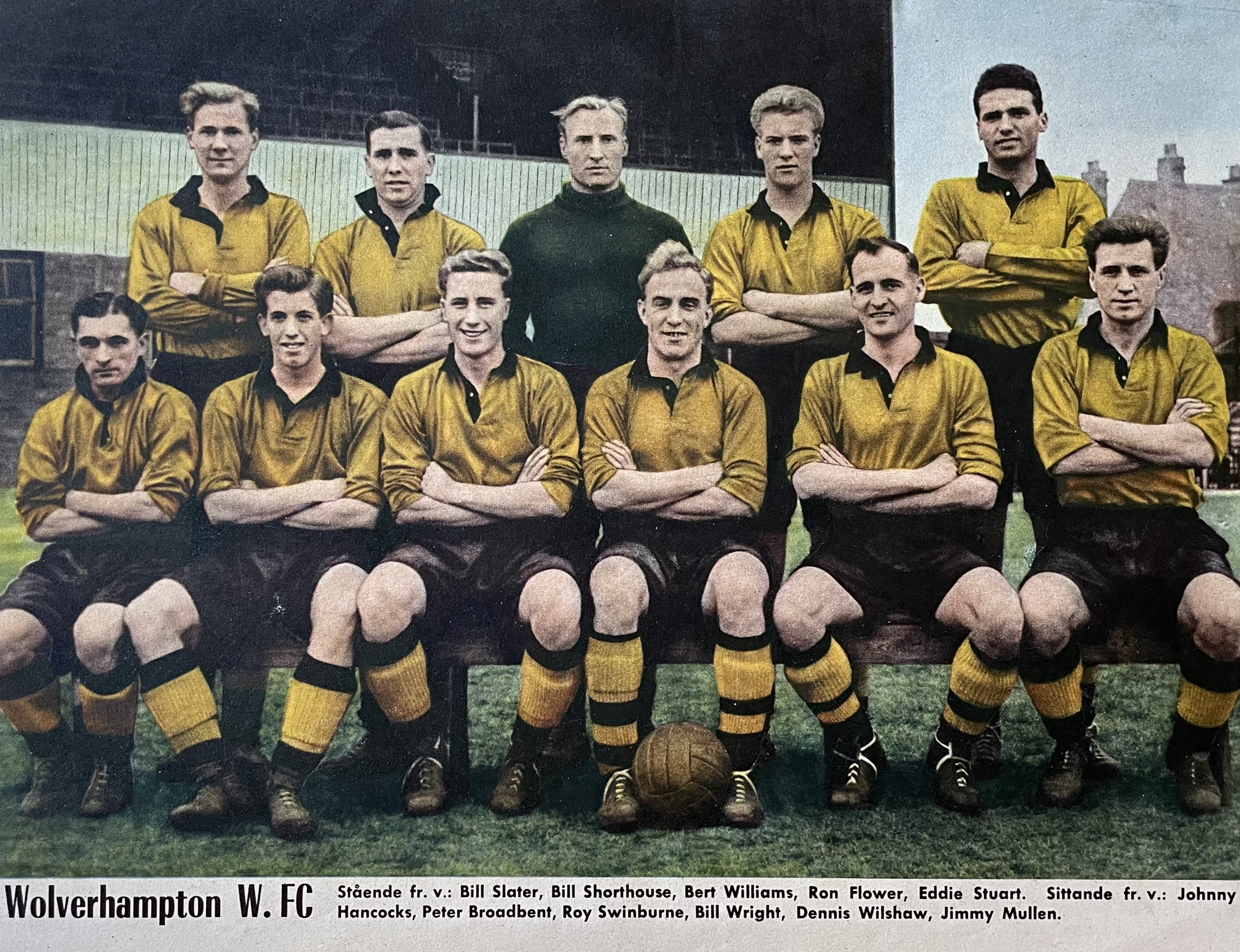
Wolverhampton Wanderers F.C. at 1955 with following players, from left standing: Bill Slater, Bill Shorthouse, Bert Williams, Ron Flowers, Eddie Stuart; front row: Johnny Hancocks, Peter Broadbent, Roy Swinbourne, Billy Wright (captain), Dennis Wilshaw and Jimmy Mullen.

Johnny Hancocks (30 April 1919 – 19 February 1994) was an English footballer, most associated with Wolverhampton Wanderers.

== Career ==
A diminutive figure, standing just 5' 4" with size 6.5 boots although there was a myth that he wore size 3 boots, Hancocks played in the Wrekin Schools team before making his debut for hometown club Oakengates Town in the Birmingham League, aged just 15. In October 1938, he turned professional with Walsall of the Third Division South and played a full season of league football there.

The outbreak of World War II halted his football career, as he joined the army in 1940 and became a physical training instructor. He did, however, manage to make several appearances for the army in representative games and also guested for Wrexham and Shrewsbury Town.

With the resumption of league football, Hancocks was signed by First Division side Wolverhampton Wanderers on 11 May 1946 for £4,000, making his debut on 31 August 1946 in a 6–1 thrashing of Arsenal. He claimed his first goal for the club in another 6–1 victory on 12 October, against Huddersfield Town, and added 9 more in his debut season. The following season, he was even more prolific, finishing as joint top scorer (alongside Jesse Pye) with 16.

Such form won him a call-up to the England team. He made his international debut on 2 December 1948 in a 6-0 hammering of Switzerland at Highbury, during which Hancocks scored twice. Despite his goalscoring debut, the likes of Stanley Matthews and Tom Finney saw him overlooked until October 1949 for his next cap (vs Wales), and he subsequently managed only one more cap (vs Yugoslavia in November 1950).

Although international acclaim eluded him, Hancocks enjoyed success at club level as his goals helped fire Wolves to their first league title in 1953–54. Months later, he famously scored a penalty in a friendly against Budapest Honvéd. He also collected an FA Cup winners medal in 1949, playing in the 3-1 final win over Leicester City, and later scored in the subsequent Charity Shield draw with Portsmouth.

He finished as top goalscorer for the club in the 1954–55 and 1955–56 seasons. In total, Hancocks scored 168 goals for Wolves in 378 appearances, making him the fourth highest goalscorer in the club's history. His tally of 158 top-flight goals is still a club record.

Despite his goals, he fell out of favour with manager Stan Cullis, and after the signing of Harry Hooper in 1956, he was relegated to the reserves. After a season out in the cold, he left the Molineux club to become player/manager of non-league Wellington Town in 1957.

He took up the managerial reins in September 1959, and left the club later that year. He finished the 1959–60 season with Cambridge United. The following season, he spent spells at Oswestry Town then GKN Sankeys, before retiring in 1961, aged 42.

After his playing career ended, he worked at RAF Cosford 1974-1976, and later at the ironfounders Maddock & Sons in his native Oakengates, until taking retirement on his 60th birthday in 1979. He died on 19 February 1994 aged 74.

== Honours ==
Wolverhampton Wanderers

- Football League First Division: 1953–54
- FA Cup: 1948–49
- FA Charity Shield: 1949 (shared)
