= Roy Swinbourne =

English footballer

Personal information
- Full name: Royston Harry Swinbourne
- Date of birth: 25 August 1929
- Place of birth: Denaby Main, England
- Date of death: 27 December 2015 (aged 86)
- Place of death: Kidderminster, England
- Position: Centre-forward

Youth career
- Wath Wanderers
- 1944–1945: Wolverhampton Wanderers

Senior career*
| Years | Team | Apps | (Gls) |
| 1945–1957 | Wolverhampton Wanderers | 211 | (107) |

International career
| 1955 | England B | 1 | (1) |
- * Club domestic league appearances and goals

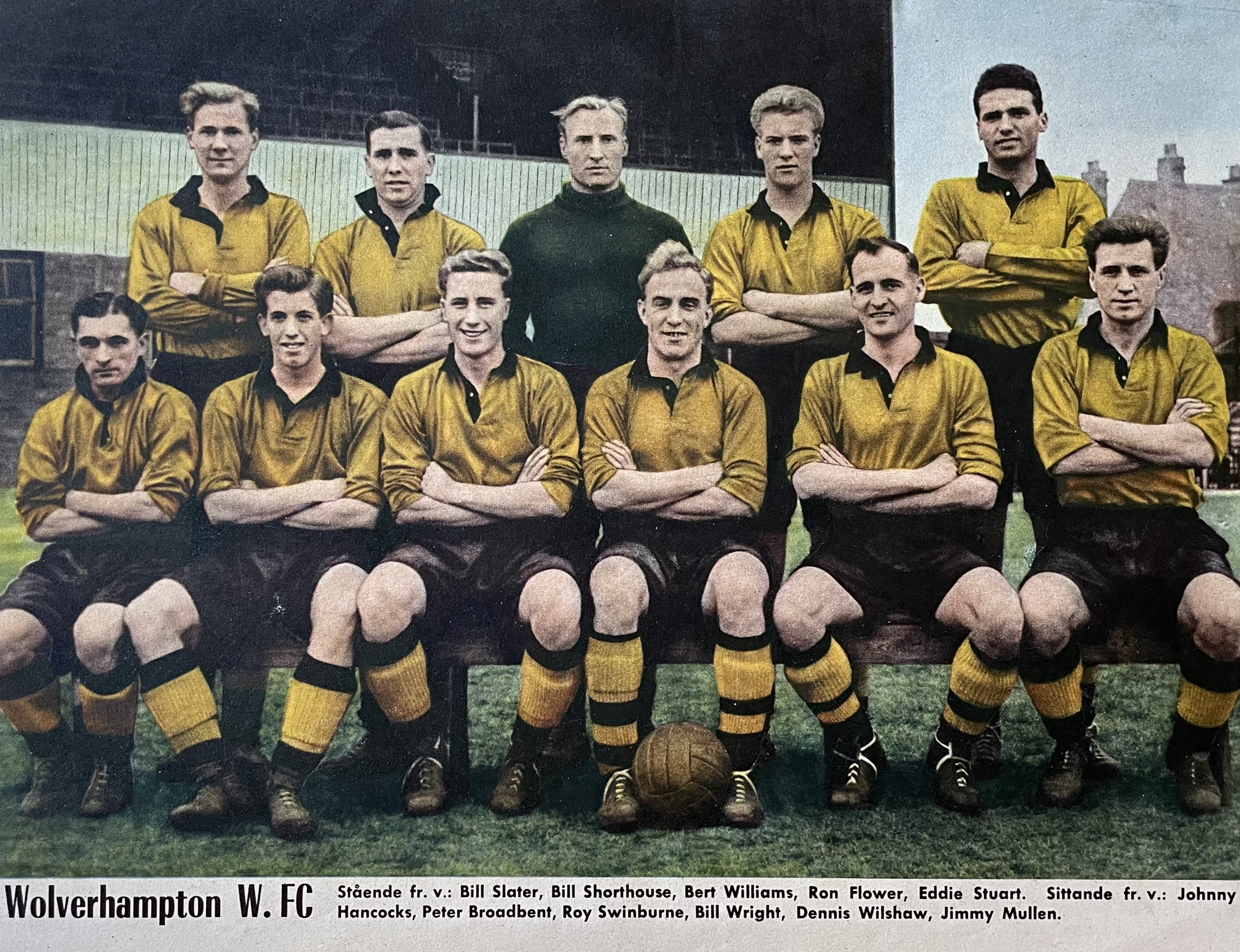
Wolverhampton Wanderers F.C. at 1955 with following players, from left standing: Bill Slater, Bill Shorthouse, Bert Williams, Ron Flowers, Eddie Stuart; front row: Johnny Hancocks, Peter Broadbent, Roy Swinbourne, Billy Wright (captain), Dennis Wilshaw and Jimmy Mullen.

Royston Harry Swinbourne (25 August 1929 – 27 December 2015) was an English footballer who played as a centre forward in the Football League for Wolverhampton Wanderers. He was capped once by England B.

== Playing career ==
Swinbourne began his career at Wath Wanderers, the Yorkshire-based nursery club of Wolverhampton Wanderers. He moved south to join Wolves in 1944 and signed as a professional the following year.

After proving himself in the reserve ranks, he made his debut on 17 December 1949 in a 1–1 draw with Fulham. He came to the fore during the 1950–51 season, replacing Jesse Pye in the attack, and finished as top goalscorer with 22 goals. Injuries waylaid him the following year, but in the next campaign, forming what was described as "a potent dual spearhead" with Dennis Wilshaw, he was once again the club's leading scorer with 21 goals.

His tally of 24 in the 1953–54 season was a career best and helped Wolves capture their first ever league championship. It was Swinbourne himself who scored twice in the final game, a 2–0 victory over Tottenham Hotspur that confirmed the title. The following season brought another strong return, including two goals in Wolves' famous floodlit victory over Honved of Hungary.

In 1955 he scored for England B in a 1–1 draw against their German counterparts:

Swinbourne too, in spite of limited support, showed that he is a dashing centre-forward who knows where the goal lies. He scored his side's goal and but for three really great diving saves by Kubsch would have snatched the victory himself.

His career was halted when he damaged his knee while hurdling over a posse of cameramen on the pitchside at Luton Town's Kenilworth Road ground in November 1955. After trying to return just weeks later, He was forced to undergo surgery on the injury, but was never able to resume his playing career and retired in May 1957.

== Later life ==
In later life, Swinbourne lived in Kinver before moving to a nursing home in Kidderminster. He died on 27 December 2015, aged 86, following a long battle with vascular dementia. He was survived by his wife, Betty, and daughters Jayne and Helen.
