= Peter Broadbent (footballer) =

English footballer

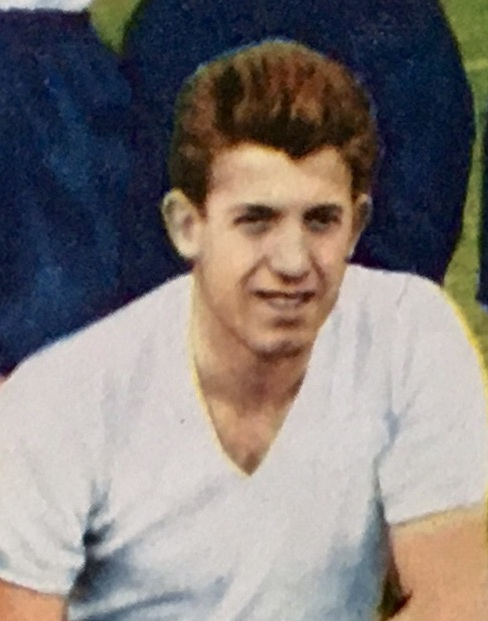

Personal information
- Full name: Peter Frank Broadbent
- Date of birth: 15 May 1933
- Place of birth: Elvington, England
- Date of death: 1 October 2013 (aged 80)
- Place of death: Himley, England
- Position: Inside forward

Youth career
- 1948–1950: Dover

Senior career*
| Years | Team | Apps | (Gls) |
| 1950–1951 | Brentford | 16 | (2) |
| 1951–1965 | Wolverhampton Wanderers | 452 | (127) |
| 1965–1966 | Shrewsbury Town | 69 | (7) |
| 1966–1969 | Aston Villa | 64 | (2) |
| 1969–1970 | Stockport County | 31 | (1) |
| 1970–1971 | Bromsgrove Rovers | 19 | (17) |
| Total | | 651 | (156) |

International career
| 1954 | England U23 | 1 | (0) |
| 1956 | England B | 1 | (0) |
| 1958 | Football League XI | 1 | (1) |
| 1958–1960 | England | 7 | (2) |
- * Club domestic league appearances and goals

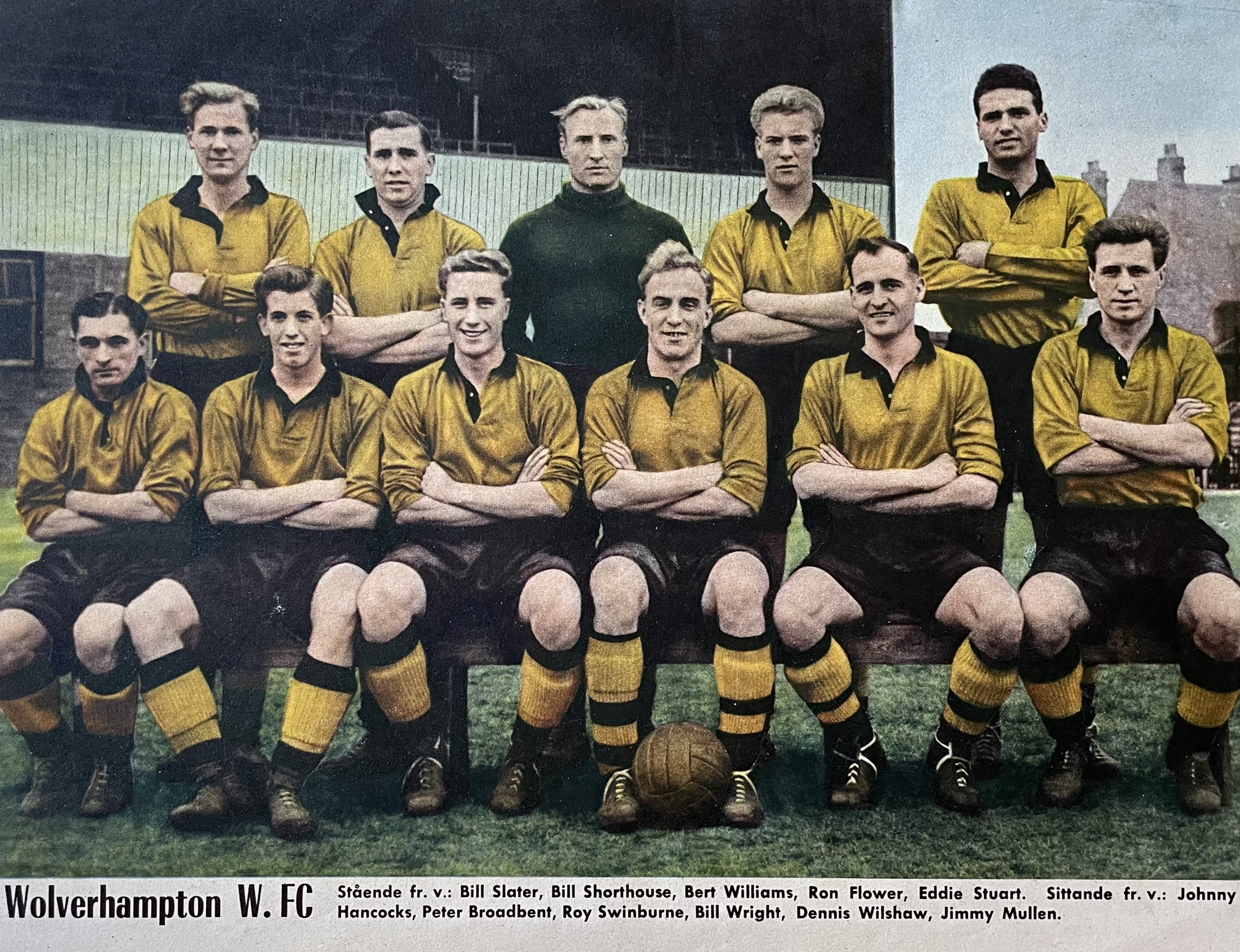
Wolverhampton Wanderers F.C. at 1955 with following players, from left standing: Bill Slater, Bill Shorthouse, Bert Williams, Ron Flowers, Eddie Stuart; front row: Johnny Hancocks, Peter Broadbent, Roy Swinbourne, Billy Wright (captain), Dennis Wilshaw and Jimmy Mullen.

Peter Frank Broadbent (15 May 1933 – 1 October 2013) was an English footballer. He won major domestic honours with Wolverhampton Wanderers and played in the 1958 FIFA World Cup.

== Career ==
In his autobiography, George Best said he was a Wolves fan and that Broadbent was the player he most admired; the pair became friends in later life. Alex Ferguson also stated that, during his youth, Broadbent had been his favourite player.

Broadbent started his career with non-league Dover FC until he was signed by Brentford. He only spent a short time there before he was snapped up by Wolves, one of the top sides in the English league at the time, in February 1951 for a £10,000 fee. He would remain at the Black Country club for the next 14 years, scoring well over 100 goals and winning three league titles and an FA Cup, as well as being capped seven times at the highest level by England.

Broadbent was a scheming inside forward with peerless skill who could pass the ball with either foot long in ch perfect passes for the Wolves forwards.

In the 1966–67 Aston Villa F.C. season the 33 year-old made his debut for the Midland club.Phil Woosnam had decided to stay in America and Villa (who had watched Broadbent for a time) swooped for him as their midfield general.

He played his last Football League game in April 1970 for Stockport County.

== Personal life ==
Broadbent attended school in Deal. After his retirement from football, he ran a babywear shop in Halesowen with his wife Shirley. They later settled in Codsall. In April 2007, it was reported that Broadbent, now in his 74th year, was suffering from Alzheimer's disease, which had become evident in his mid-60s and was living in a care home near Wolverhampton. On 1 October 2013 he died, aged 80, having suffered from Alzheimer's for some 15 years.

== Honours ==
Wolverhampton Wanderers

- Football League First Division: 1953–54, 1957–58, 1958–59
- FA Cup: 1959–60
- FA Charity Shield: 1959

Individual

- Wolverhampton Wanderers Hall of Fame
