= Jimmy Mullen (footballer, born 1923) =

English footballer

Personal information
- Full name: James Mullen
- Date of birth: 6 January 1923
- Place of birth: Newcastle upon Tyne, England
- Date of death: 23 October 1987 (aged 64)
- Place of death: Wolverhampton, England
- Position: Outside left

Youth career
- Newcastle Boys
- Northumberland Boys

Senior career*
Years	Team	Apps	(Gls)
1937–1960	Wolverhampton Wanderers	445	(98)

International career
1947–1954	England	12	(6)
- * Club domestic league appearances and goals

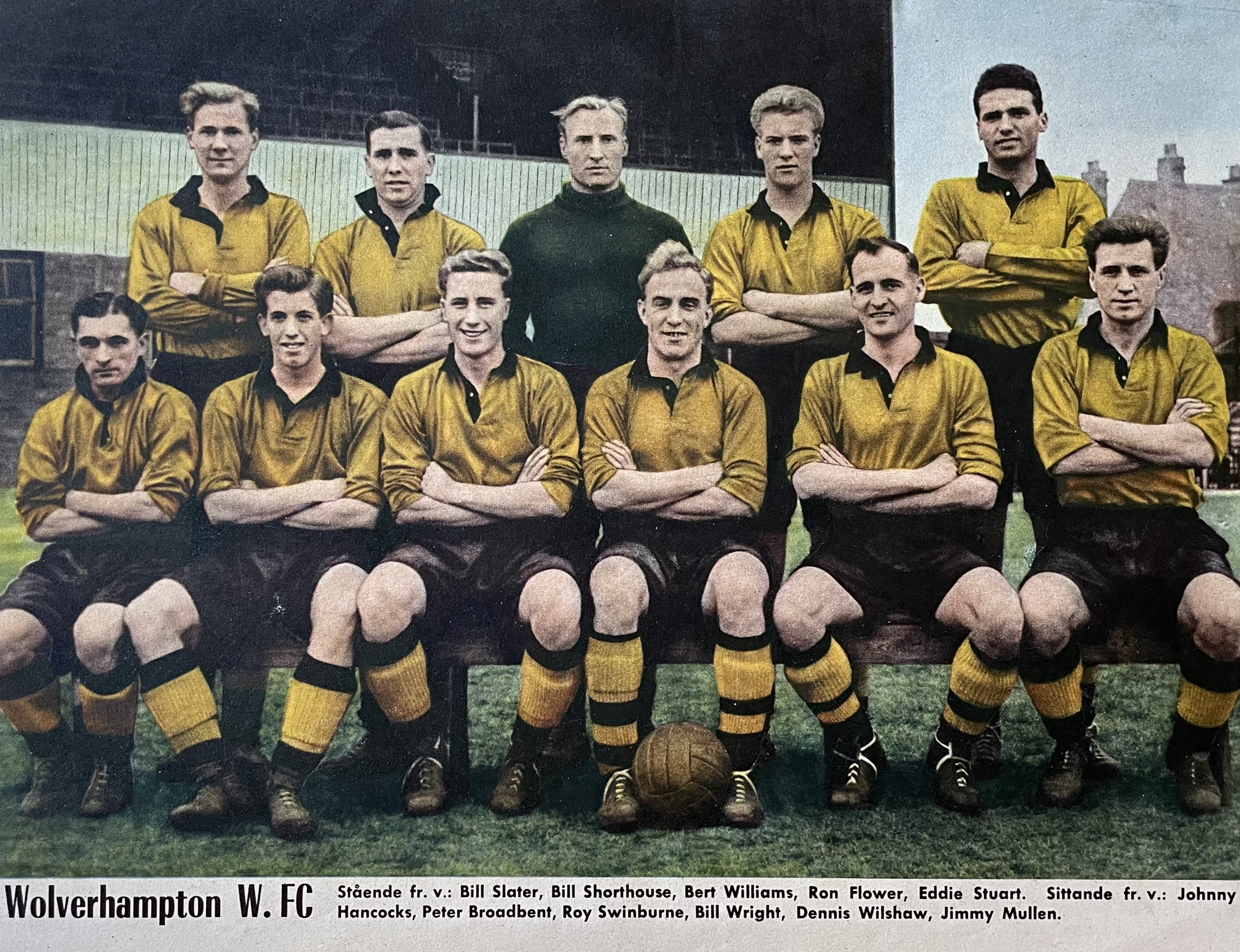
Wolverhampton Wanderers F.C. at 1955 with following players, from left standing: Bill Slater, Bill Shorthouse, Bert Williams, Ron Flowers, Eddie Stuart; front row: Johnny Hancocks, Peter Broadbent, Roy Swinbourne, Billy Wright (captain), Dennis Wilshaw and Jimmy Mullen.

James Mullen (6 January 1923 – 23 October 1987) was an English international footballer who played as an outside left.

Mullen spent his whole career at Wolverhampton Wanderers where he won three English Football League championships and the FA Cup. He also represented the England national team at both the 1950 and 1954 World Cup.

== Career ==
Mullen joined the Midlanders in June 1937, turned professional on his 17th birthday, and remained with the club until his retirement in May 1960. His league debut came in February 1939, in a 4–1 win over Leeds United. He made 488 appearances in total, scoring 112 goals, helping the club win their only three league titles (1953–54, 1957–58 and 1958–59) as well as the FA Cup in 1949.

He also played for England, earning 12 caps. He became England's first ever substitute in an international on 18 May 1950, scoring against Belgium at Heysel Stadium in a 4–1 win. He also played in the 1950 FIFA World Cup and the 1954 FIFA World Cup. He scored 6 goals, including in the 1954 World Cup against Switzerland.

During the Second World War, he served as a soldier in the Army from 1942 onward, based at Farnborough, Catterick and Barnard Castle. After retiring from football, he ran a sports shop in Wolverhampton until shortly before his death.

He died at the age of 64.

== Career statistics ==
=== Club ===
Appearances and goals by club, season and competition
Club	Season (Note: Mullen also appeared in wartime games, scoring goals)	League			FA Cup		Europe		Other		Total	
Club	Season	Division	Apps	Goals	Apps	Goals	Apps	Goals	Apps	Goals	Apps	Goals
Wolverhampton Wanderers	1938–39	First Division	8	0	2	0	–		–		10	0
Wolverhampton Wanderers	1945–46	First Division	–		4	1	–		–		4	1
Wolverhampton Wanderers	1946–47	First Division	38	11	0	0	–		–		38	11
Wolverhampton Wanderers	1947–48	First Division	34	8	3	2	–		–		37	10
Wolverhampton Wanderers	1948–49	First Division	38	12	7	3	–		–		45	15
Wolverhampton Wanderers	1949–50	First Division	40	10	6	1	–		1 (Note: Appearance in FA Charity Shield)	0	47	11
Wolverhampton Wanderers	1950–51	First Division	31	5	6	1	–		–		37	6
Wolverhampton Wanderers	1951–52	First Division	40	11	3	3	–		–		43	14
Wolverhampton Wanderers	1952–53	First Division	41	11	1	0	–		–		42	11
Wolverhampton Wanderers	1953–54	First Division	38	7	1	0	–		–		39	7
Wolverhampton Wanderers	1954–55	First Division	17	5	0	0	–		–		17	5
Wolverhampton Wanderers	1955–56	First Division	36	7	1	0	–		–		37	7
Wolverhampton Wanderers	1956–57	First Division	30	3	2	1	–		–		32	4
Wolverhampton Wanderers	1957–58	First Division	38	4	4	2	–		–		42	6
Wolverhampton Wanderers	1958–59	First Division	16	4	0	0	2	0	–		18	4
Career total			445	98	40	14	2	0	1	0	488	112

== International ==
Appearances and goals by national team and year
National team	Year	Apps	Goals
England	1947	1	0
England	1949	2	1
England	1950	3	1
England	1953	3	2
England	1954	3	2
Total		12	6

Scores and results list England's goal tally first, score column indicates score after each Mullen goal.

List of international goals scored by Jimmy Mullen
No.	Date	Venue	Opponent	Score	Result	Competition	Ref.
1	18 May 1949	Ullevaal Stadion, Oslo, Norway	Norway	1–0	4–1	Friendly	
2	18 May 1950	King Baudouin Stadium, Brussels, Belgium	Belgium	1–1	4–1	Friendly	
3	21 October 1953	Wembley Stadium, London, England	FIFA World XI	2–3	4–4	Friendly	
4	21 October 1953	Wembley Stadium, London, England	FIFA World XI	3–3	4–4	Friendly	
5	3 April 1954	Hampden Park, Glasgow, Scotland	Scotland	4–1	4–2	1954 FIFA World Cup qualification	
6	20 June 1954	Wankdorf Stadium, Bern, Switzerland	Switzerland	1–0	2–0	1954 FIFA World Cup	

== Honours ==
Wolverhampton Wanderers

- Football League First Division: 1953–54, 1957–58, 1958–59
- FA Cup: 1948–49
- FA Charity Shield: 1949 (shared)
