= Bill Slater (footballer) =

English footballer (1927–2018)

Personal information
- Full name: William John Slater
- Date of birth: 29 April 1927
- Place of birth: Clitheroe, England
- Date of death: 18 December 2018 (aged 91)
- Place of death: Oxfordshire, England
- Positions: Inside forward; left half; full back

Senior career*
Years	Team	Apps	(Gls)
1944–1951	Blackpool	30	(9)
1951–1952	Brentford	7	(1)
1952–1963	Wolverhampton Wanderers	310	(24)
1963–1964	Brentford	5	(2)
- Northern Nomads
Total		352	(36)

International career
1950–1953	England Amateurs	20	(7)
1952	Great Britain	1	(1)
1954–1960	England	12	(0)
- * Club domestic league appearances and goals

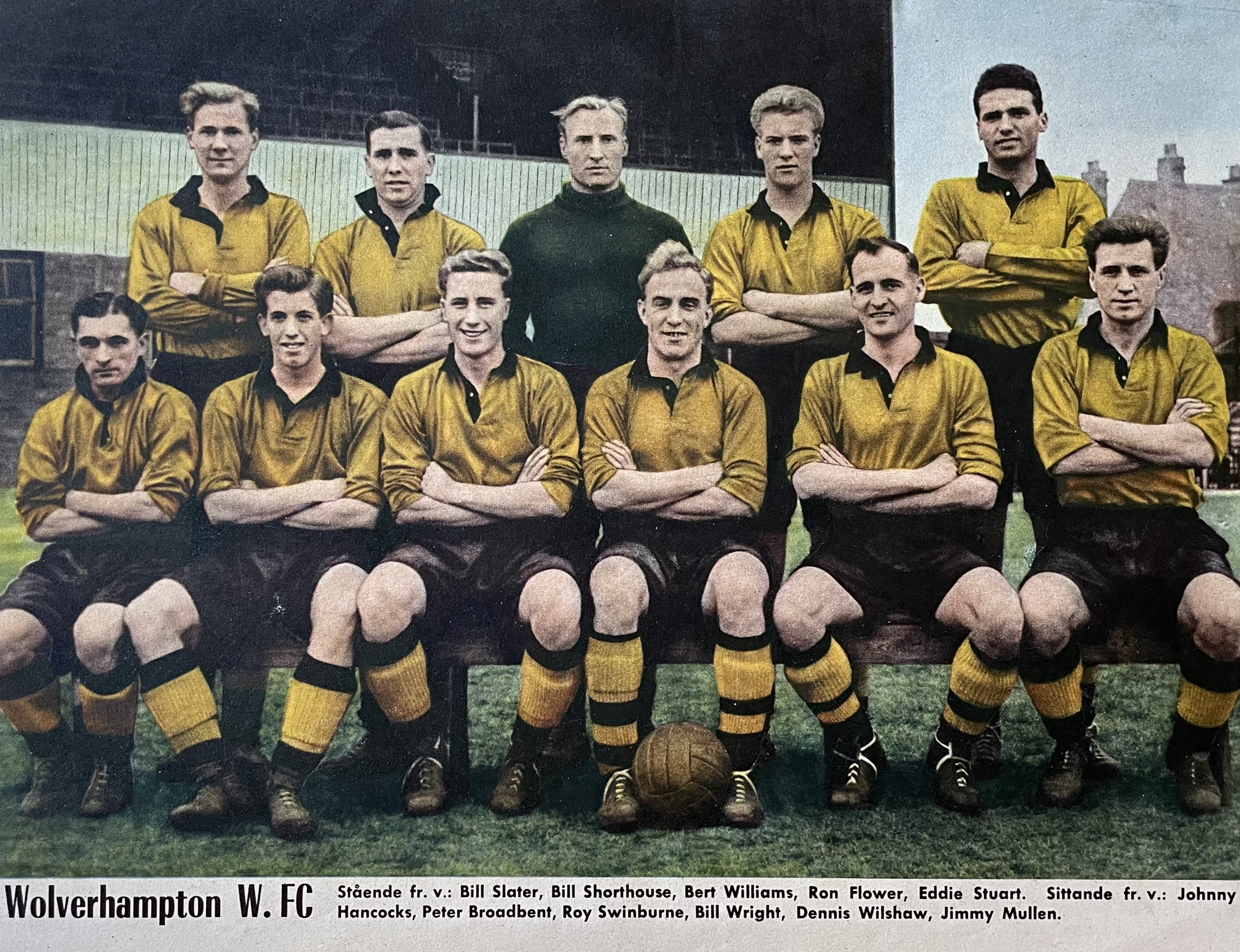
Wolverhampton Wanderers F.C. at 1955 with following players, standing from left: Bill Slater, Bill Shorthouse, Bert Williams, Ron Flowers, Eddie Stuart; front row: Johnny Hancocks, Peter Broadbent, Roy Swinbourne, Billy Wright (captain), Dennis Wilshaw and Jimmy Mullen.

William John Slater, CBE (29 April 1927 – 18 December 2018), also commonly known as W. J. Slater, was an English professional footballer. Slater made the majority of his appearances for Wolverhampton Wanderers, with whom he won three league championships and the FA Cup.

== Career ==
Slater started his career as a 16-year-old amateur at Blackpool in 1944 and played in the 1951 FA Cup Final in which Blackpool lost to Newcastle United, becoming the last amateur to play in an FA Cup Final at Wembley. Another record he jointly holds is Blackpool's fastest-ever goal: 11 seconds into a game against Stoke City on 10 December 1949. This was matched by James Quinn in 1995. Slater made his Blackpool debut on 10 September 1949, in a goalless draw at Aston Villa. As an inside-forward, he competed with Allan Brown for the number 10 position for the majority of his time at the seaside.

After finishing college, in December 1951 he moved to Brentford where he made 8 appearances and then, in August 1952, joined Wolverhampton Wanderers as a part-time professional. He remained at Molineux until 1963, making 339 total appearances and scoring 25 goals. He won three Football League championships (1953–54, 1957–58, 1958–59), as well as being runners-up (1954–55, 1959–60). He also won an FA Cup (1960, against Blackburn Rovers, in the year he was voted Footballer of the Year). He gained 12 caps for England (including four in the 1958 World Cup) and 20 amateur caps.

At the World Cup he played all four of England's matches, the first two at left half and then in midfield. In the second game against Brazil he marked the influential midfielder Didi effectively, with England securing a 0–0 draw. Slater also represented Great Britain at the 1952 Summer Olympics. He also played cricket for Warwickshire's second XI, in both the Second XI Championship and the Minor Counties Championship.

In July 1963, he returned to Brentford and later played for Northern Nomads.

== Later life ==
After retiring from play he became Deputy Director of Crystal Palace Sports Centre while at same time being Director of Physical Education at Birmingham and Liverpool Universities. In 1989 he became President of the British Gymnastics Association and later a member of the British National Olympic Committee.

In 1982, Slater was appointed an OBE for his services to sport. A CBE followed in 1998. In February 2009, his daughter Barbara Slater was chosen to be the first female Director of Sport at the BBC. Slater died on 18 December 2018, aged 91, from complications of Alzheimer's disease.

== Honours ==
Blackpool

- FA Cup runner-up: 1950–51

Wolverhampton Wanderers

- Football League First Division: 1953–54, 1957–58, 1958–59
- FA Cup: 1959–60

Individual

- Wolverhampton Wanderers Hall of Fame
- Order of the British Empire: 1982 Officer (Civil)
- Order of the British Empire: 1998 Commander (Civil)
- FWA Footballer of the Year: 1960
