= Bert Williams (footballer, born 1920) =

English footballer (1920–2014)

Bert Williams MBE
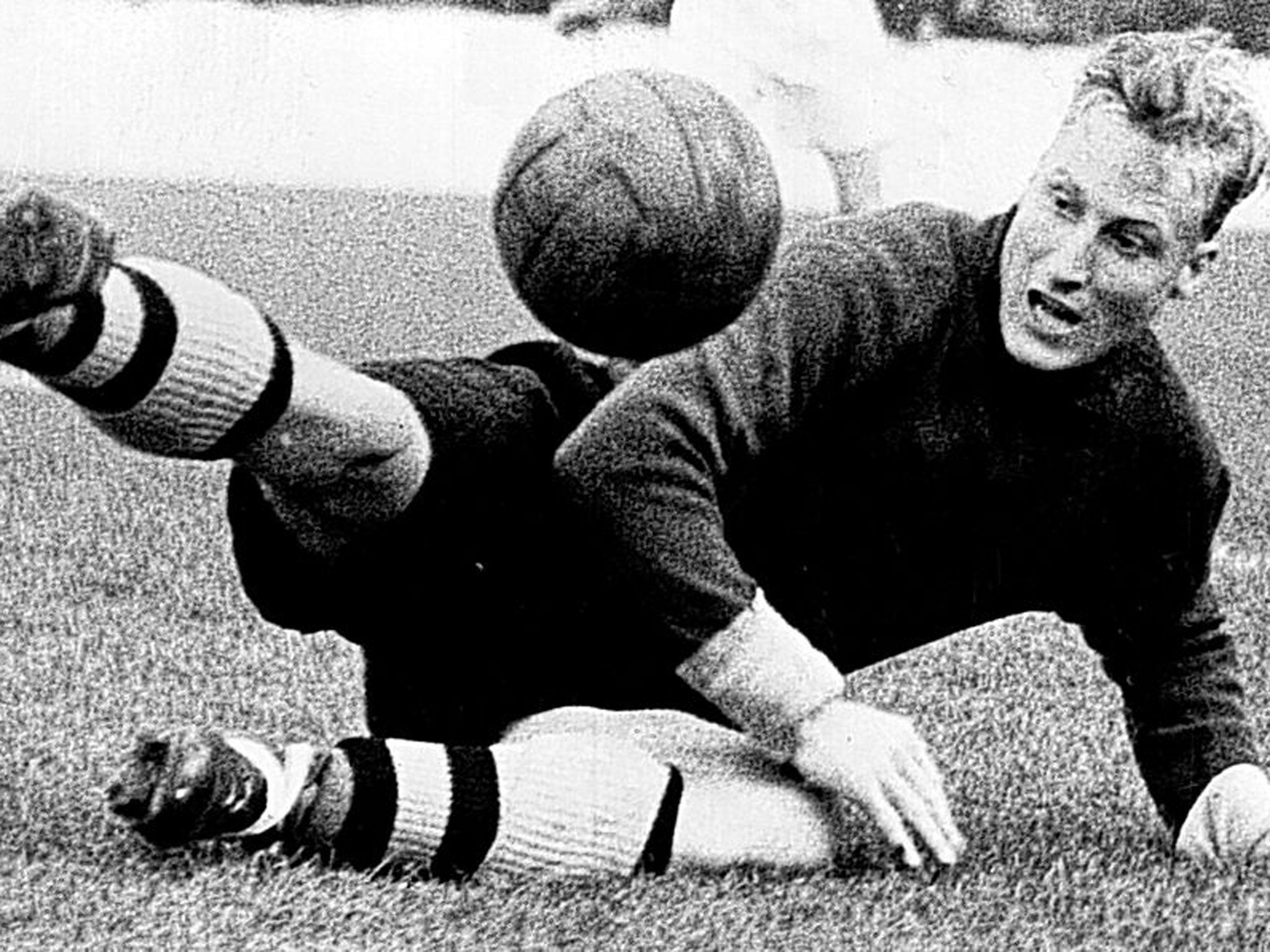
- Bert Williams

Personal information
- Full name: Bert Frederick Williams
- Date of birth: 31 January 1920
- Place of birth: Bradley, England
- Date of death: 19 January 2014 (aged 93)
- Place of death: Shifnal, England
- Height: 5 ft 10 in (1.78 m)
- Position: Goalkeeper

Youth career
- Bilston
- Thompson's FC

Senior career*
Years	Team	Apps	(Gls)
1937–1945	Walsall	25	(0)
1945–1959	Wolverhampton Wanderers	381	(0)
Total		406	(0)

International career
1949	England B	1	(0)
1949–1955	England	24	(0)
Military career
Allegiance	United Kingdom
Branch	Royal Air Force
Service years	1940–1945
Rank	Sergeant
Unit	Physical training instructor
Conflicts	Second World War
- * Club domestic league appearances and goals

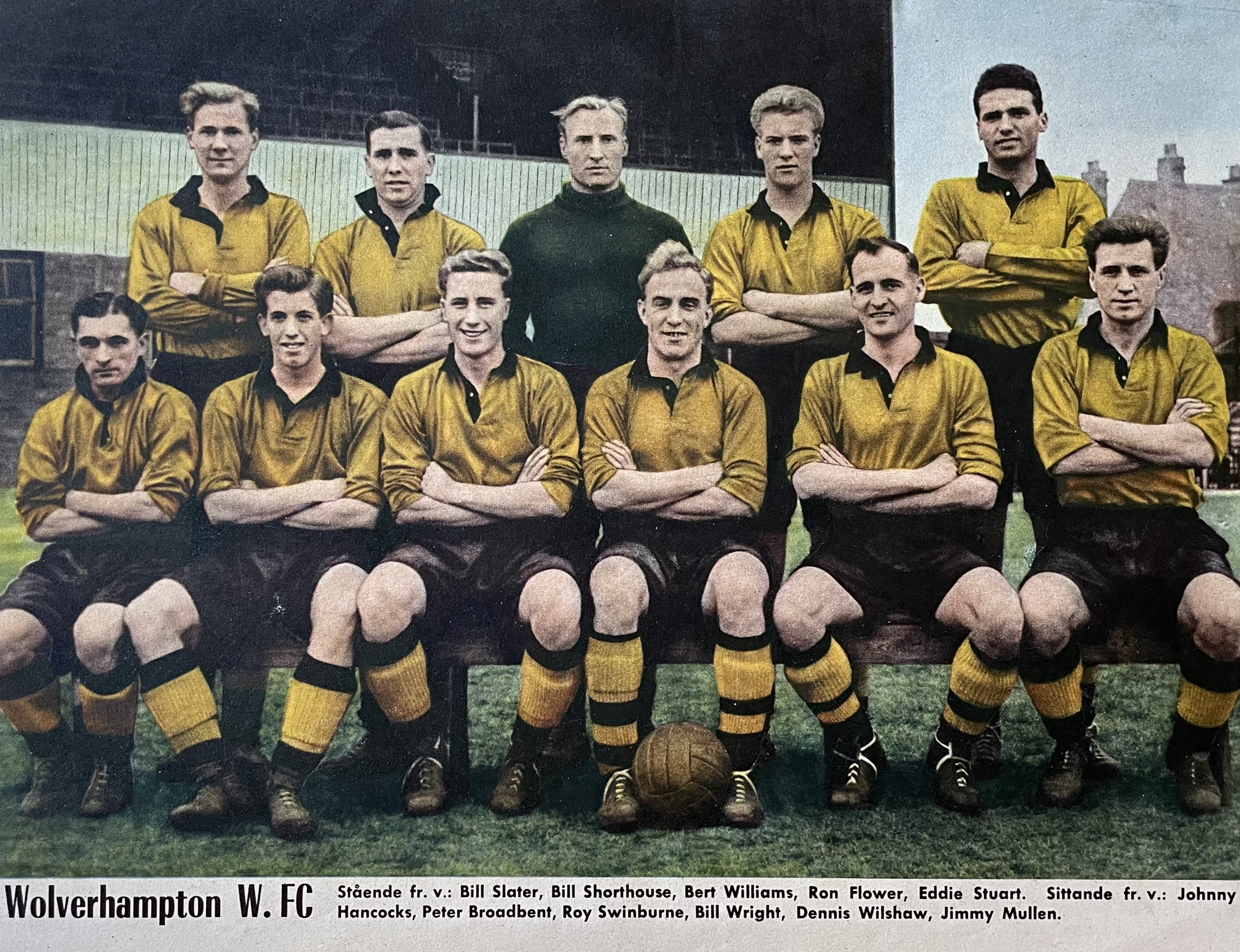
Wolverhampton Wanderers F.C. at 1955 with following players, standing from left: Bill Slater, Bill Shorthouse, Bert Williams, Ron Flowers, Eddie Stuart; front row: Johnny Hancocks, Peter Broadbent, Roy Swinbourne, Billy Wright (captain), Dennis Wilshaw and Jimmy Mullen.

Bert Frederick Williams OBE (31 January 1920 – 19 January 2014) was an English international football goalkeeper. Nicknamed The Cat, he spent the majority of his playing career at Wolverhampton Wanderers where he won the League Championship and FA Cup. At the time of his death Williams was the oldest living England international.

== Early career ==
Williams started playing competitive football as a young man when he was a member of the 19th Wolverhampton Company of The Boys' Brigade (Bradley Methodist Church). He was then offered the chance to play for Walsall's reserves, whilst playing for Thompson's FC, the works team of the local factory he was employed at. He was taken on permanently and turned professional in April 1937.

The outbreak of World War II halted his progress, after two seasons of playing, as he joined the RAF, serving as a Physical Training instructor. He found time in between his duties to turn out as a guest for both Nottingham Forest and Chelsea in friendlies.

== Wolves and England ==
With the conflict over, Williams resumed his career by signing for First Division Wolverhampton Wanderers in September 1945 for £3,500. He immediately became first choice at the Molineux club, making his official debut when league football resumed on 31 August 1946 in a 6–1 win over Arsenal, a game that was also the Wolves début of Johnny Hancocks.

He gained his first honour in 1949 as the team lifted the FA Cup after defeating Leicester City. His part in winning this prize saw him rewarded with an England call-up later that month, as he made his international debut on 22 May 1949 in a 3–1 friendly win in France. He held onto the goalkeeper's jersey through the 1950 FIFA World Cup, and at that tournament played in England's surprise defeat by the USA.

He won the league title with Wolves in 1953–54. In total, he made 420 appearances for Wolves.

== After football ==
After ending his football career, he ran a sports shop in Bilston, a sporting centre and lived near Shifnal in Shropshire.

Williams was appointed Member of the Order of the British Empire (MBE) in the 2010 Birthday Honours for services to football and to charity.

Bert Williams Leisure Centre in Bilston is named after him and opened in 2011.

== Honours ==
Wolverhampton Wanderers

- Football League First Division: 1953–54
- FA Cup: 1948–49
- FA Charity Shield: 1949*, 1954* (* shared)
