= Bilston (disambiguation) =

Bilston may refer to:

== Places ==
- Bilston, a market town in the West Midlands, England
- Bilston, Midlothian, a village in Scotland

== People ==
- Brian Bilston (born 1970), pen name of Paul Millicheap, British poet and author
- Sarah Bilston, British author and professor of English literature

== Other uses ==
- Bilston Tree, a large gum tree in Victoria, Australia
- Relating to Bilston, West Midlands:
  - Bilston Central railway station
  - Bilston Central tram stop
  - Bilston Craft Gallery
  - Bilston East (ward)
  - Bilston North (ward)
  - Bilston School of Art
  - Bilston Town F.C.
  - Bilston Town Hall
  - Bilston (UK Parliament constituency)
  - Bilston West railway station
  - Odeon Cinema, Bilston
