= Onion (disambiguation) =

Onion is the common name given to plants in the genus Allium.

Onion or Onions may also refer to:

== Places ==
- Onion Creek (Texas)
- Onion River (disambiguation), various rivers in the United States

== People ==
- Ken Onion (born 1963), American knifemaker
- Todd Bodine (b. 1964), NASCAR driver nicknamed "The Onion"
- Onions (surname)

== Arts, entertainment, and media ==
- The Onion, an American digital media company and news satire organization
- Onion, the name of the Pikmin spaceship in Pikmin (series)
- Onion, the name of a character in the animated TV series Steven Universe
- Onion (album), an album by Shannon and the Clams
- Onion, a 2009 album by Mike McClure
- Onion, a titular character in the TV series Apple & Onion

== Organizational structures ==
- Onion (Arendt), a philosophical metaphor representing the organization of totalitarianism
- Onion model, a kind of chart that shows the dependencies among parts of an organization or process

== Computing and technology ==
- .onion, a pseudo-top-level domain host suffix
- Onion routing, an anonymous communication technique

== Other uses ==
- Onion (horse), an American thoroughbred racehorse
- False sea onion
- "The Onion", a nickname for the main building of the Sepulveda Unitarian Universalist Society.
