= Kidson =

Kidson may refer to:

Surname

- Kidson (surname)

Geography

- Kisdon Force, series of waterfalls on the River Swale in Swaledale, England
- Kidson Island, island 28 km north-northeast of Byrd Head, Antarctica
- Cape Kidson, abrupt rock scarp on the north side of the entrance to New Bedford Inlet, Palmer Land, Antarctica
- Kidson Weir, on the Klip river in South Africa

== See also ==
- Kidsongs
