= Hostile (disambiguation) =

To be hostile is a form of angry internal rejection or denial in psychology.

Hostile may also refer to:

== Film and television ==
- Hostile (2022 film)
- Hostile, a 2017 film starring Brittany Ashworth and Grégory Fitoussi
- Hostiles (film)
- "Hostile" (Runaways), an episode of Runaways

== Other uses ==
- HMS Hostile (H55), an H-class destroyer
- One of the classes in the North Korean Songbun system

== See also ==
- Hostiles (disambiguation)
