= William Harold Dudley =

English painter

- Born: 1890; Bilston, Staffordshire, England, United Kingdom
- Died: 1949 (aged 58–59)
- Education: Bilston School of Art
- Occupation: Painter

William Harold Dudley (1890–1949) was a painter, born in Bilston, Staffordshire in the Midlands. He taught at Cheltenham College of Art and was Head of Art at Newport College of Art between 1922 and 1940. He exhibited at the Royal Academy, Royal West of England Academy, Royal Birmingham Society of Artists and the Paris Salon. He painted landscapes which display the effects of light and colour on the landscape, often working out of doors. As well as painting the area close to his home in the West of England, he also produced numerous views of Polperro in Cornwall, which he and his wife visited regularly. In his 50s he developed Parkinson's disease, which hampered his ability to paint and he died in 1949.

== Early life ==
Dudley was part of a close knit working-class family. His father, Mesach, was an ironworker, employed at Bowen's ironworks in Bilston and his mother, Mary, was a coal-dealer's daughter from Ettingshall. He had three sisters Annie (b. 1882), Harriet (b. 1884) and Mary (b. 1894) and an older brother, Thomas (b. 1886) He studied at Bilston School of Art and later at the Royal College of Art, London, graduating from there in 1916.

== The war years ==
During the First World War Dudley worked for the Intelligence Corps, drawing maps and he is mentioned in despatches for his bravery crawling through the trenches to deliver maps to the front line. Some works from this period exist, including an etching of a monk and a watercolour of a young boy. At around this time he married Frances Wells, who had been his art teacher. The couple did not have children but they shared a love of art and were both keen travellers.

== Teaching career ==
After the war Dudley taught art in Cheltenham and Newport, South Wales as well as pursuing his painting career. His style was similar to that of the 'plein-air' painters of the Newlyn School, which included Alexander Stanhope Forbes and his wife Elizabeth Armstrong. After his death in 1949, his wife Frances, bequeathed many of his paintings to Bilston Art Gallery. and they are now in the collection of Wolverhampton Arts and Heritage Service.
