= Kidson (surname) =

Kidson is a patronymic surname of English origin. surnamedb.com claims it is derived from the given name Kit, which is traced to the name Christopher.

== People with the surname ==
- Alfred Kidson (1863–1937), Australian lawyer and politician
- Charles Kidson (1867–1908), New Zealand art teacher, artist, craftsman and sculptor
- Edward Kidson (1882–1939), New Zealand meteorologist and scientific administrator
- Elsa Kidson (1905–1979), New Zealand soil scientist and sculptor
- Frank Kidson (1855–1926), English folk song collector and music scholar
- Peter Kidson, historian
