= Dennis Gordon =

Dennis Gordon may refer to:

- Dennis Gordon (footballer) (1924–1998), English footballer
- Dennis Gordon (politician) (fl. 2020s), Jamaican politician

== See also ==
- Dennie Gordon (fl. 1990s–2020s), American film and television director.
