= William Dudley =

William Dudley may refer to:

- William Dudley (colonel) (1766–1813), War of 1812 officer in the Kentucky Militia
- William Dudley (18th century), a Roxbury, Massachusetts landowner and a namesake of Dudley, Massachusetts
- William Dudley (bishop) (died 1483), bishop of Durham
- William C. Dudley (born 1953), economist at the New York Federal Reserve
- William Harold Dudley (1890–1949), painter
- William Lofland Dudley (1859–1914), chemistry professor
- William Russel Dudley (1849–1911), botanist
- William S. Dudley (born 1936), U.S. naval historian
- William Wade Dudley (1842–1909), soldier in the American Civil War, then became a lawyer, a government official and a Republican campaigner
- William Dudley (designer) (1947–2025), British theatre designer
- William Dudley (swimmer) (1931–1978), American swimmer
- William Edward Dudley (1868–1938), administrator in the British co-operative movement
- Sir William Dudley, 1st Baronet (1597–1670), English politician
- Bill Dudley (1921–2010), American football player
