= List of onions =

List of onions may refer to:

- List of Allium species; Allium is the onion genus, with 600-920 species, making it one of the largest plant genera in the world
- List of onion cultivars; cultivars of the onion (Allium cepa)
- List of Tor onion services, list of tor onion websites
- Onion varieties
- Onion (disambiguation)
