= Bilston East (ward) =

Electoral ward of Wolverhampton City Council

Coordinates: 52.562°N 2.069°W

Bilston East was a ward of Wolverhampton City Council, West Midlands. It covered Bilston town centre and the southern and eastern parts of the town of Bilston, as well as Bradley. It bordered the Spring Vale, Ettingshall, and Bilston North wards, as well as the Metropolitan Boroughs of Walsall, Sandwell, and Dudley. It formed part of the Wolverhampton South East constituency.

In 2021 the Boundary Commission proposed changes to Wolverhampton council wards. Bilston East ward was abolished, with Bilston town centre moving into Bilston North, with the rest of the ward joining an expanded St Peter's ward. The new ward boundaries took effect from the 2023 Council elections.

== See also ==
- City of Wolverhampton Council elections
