= Bradley, West Midlands =

Coordinates: 52.5528°N 2.0752°W

Bradley
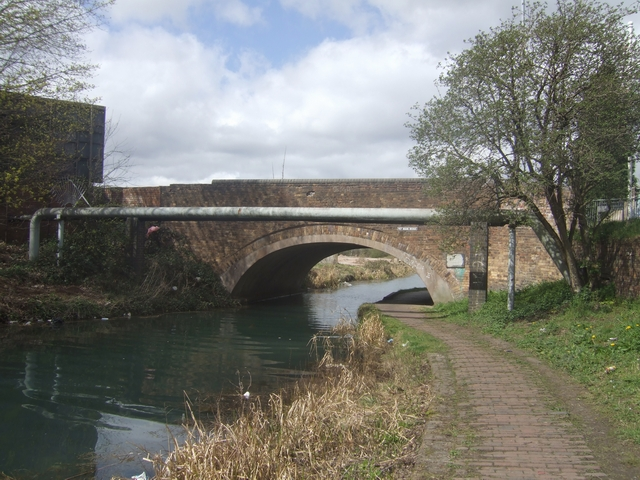
- Pot House Bridge, Bradley: the B4163 passes over the Wednesbury Oak Loop

- Location within the West Midlands
- OS grid reference: SO959952
- Metropolitan borough: Wolverhampton
- Metropolitan county: West Midlands
- Region: West Midlands
- Country: England
- Sovereign state: United Kingdom
- Post town: Bilston
- Postcode district: WV14
- Dialling code: 01902
- Police: West Midlands
- Fire: West Midlands
- Ambulance: West Midlands
- UK Parliament: Wolverhampton South East

Bradley (/ˈbreɪdli/ BRAYD-lee) is a suburban village in the City of Wolverhampton, West Midlands County, England. It is located in the Bilston East ward.

== History ==
Originally part of the ancient manor of Sedgley, from 1894 to 1966 it was part of Coseley Urban District Council until being transferred into the Wolverhampton County Borough as a suburb of Bilston, although a small section of it was transferred into the expanded West Bromwich borough (which in turn merged with Warley in 1974 to become Sandwell) which had also taken over the bulk of neighbouring Tipton and Wednesbury.

Bradley sprang up during the 19th century with several factories and farms surrounded by mostly terraced houses in which the factory and farm workers lived. But almost all of Bradley had been redeveloped by the early 1970s, the majority of homes in the area were council-owned.

The Wednesbury Oak Loop of the Birmingham Canal Navigations winds round the north of the village. This was originally part of the main line of the canal between Birmingham and Wolverhampton, planned by James Brindley and built between 1768 and 1772. A separate canal, the Bradley Branch, terminated at Wednesbury Oak, to the south of Bradley.

== Notable people ==
- Bradley was for several years the home, and the place of death, of John Wilkinson, an English industrialist.
- Science fiction writer Hugh Walters was born in Bradley in 1910 and lived in Bilston until his death in 1993.
- Wolves and England goalkeeper Bert Williams was edudated in Bradley at St Martin's School.
- Bradley was the birthplace and lifelong home of Dennis Turner, Baron Bilston. He was a life peer in the House of Lords and former Member of Parliament.
