= Onions (surname) =

Onions is a surname, also spelled O'Nions. Notable people with the surname include:

- Alfred Onions (1858–1921), Welsh politician and trade unionist
- Charles Talbut Onions (1873–1965), English grammarian and lexicographer
- George Onions (1883–1944), English recipient of the Victoria Cross
- Graham Onions (born 1982), English cricketer
- Keith O'Nions (born 1944), British scientist, president and rector of Imperial College London
- Oliver Onions (1873–1961), English novelist
- Sheila O'Nions Walsh (1928–2009), English novelist, also known as Sheila Walsh and Sophie Leyton
