= Sonita Gale =

British filmmaker

- Born: 4 June 1975 (age 50); Bilston, Wolverhampton
- Occupation: Documentary filmmaker
- Known for: Hostile (2021)

Sonita Gale is a British-Indian film director, writer, and producer based in London, known for the political documentary Hostile (2021), which explores the Home Office’s ‘hostile environment’ policy towards migrants in the UK.

== Early life ==
Born and raised in Wolverhampton, Gale was one of ten children born to Indian immigrant parents. Her mother and father were Sikhs who emigrated from Punjab following the Partition of India in 1947; her mother walked for 16 consecutive days from Lahore to Punjab before traveling to the UK. The couple went on to own a convenience shop in Bilston, Wolverhampton. Gale cites her upbringing in a "mixed community" in the West Midlands as inspiration for her films, which often grapple with themes of migration, diaspora, community and belonging.

She attended Hall Green School and Bilston Community College, before studying for a BSc in Psychology at London Guildhall University.

Gale has spoken in interviews about the racial abuse she received growing up, which included being called racist slurs and being chased down a street by the National Front.

== Career ==
Before embarking on her career as a filmmaker, Gale was a headhunter at Harvey Nash and Glotel.

In 2011, Gale established her production company, Galeforce Films. Her first production, Andrew Carnegie: Rags to Riches, Power to Peace (2015), charted the rise of 19th-century industrialist and philanthropist Andrew Carnegie. It was narrated by actor Brain Cox and broadcast on BBC Scotland.

Gale has produced a number of other short films and series including International Health Service (2020) with BAFTA-nominated documentary filmmaker Ursula Macfarlane and Happy Epidemic (2020), a web series produced from home during the coronavirus pandemic featuring former Channel 4 News journalist and anchor Jon Snow.

Gale is currently developing new documentary and narrative work.

== Hostile (2021) ==
In 2021, Gale directed, produced and wrote the documentary Hostile, which examines the human stories behind the UK government's ‘hostile environment’ immigration policy ushered in by the Clegg-Cameron coalition. She made the film during the Coronavirus pandemic, saying the community response "made me think of my childhood growing up in the Midlands with Sikh parents, [where] my father's corner shop was the hub of the community."

The film explores the experiences of four Britons from Black and Asian backgrounds, including an NHS worker who had ‘no recourse to public funds’ (NRPF) during the Coronavirus pandemic under the Immigration and Asylum Act 1999; a victim of the Windrush scandal who was detained and threatened with deportation between 2015 and 2017 despite living in the UK since the age of eight; and a couple who served more than 350,000 meals to NHS staff and vulnerable people during the pandemic.

The film also features a number of prominent voices on immigration policy, including MP Stephen Timms, writer and academic Maya Goodfellow, campaigner Patrick Vernon, spoken-word artist George the Poet, MP Zarah Sultana, and musician Nitin Sawhney.

Hostile premiered at Raindance Film Festival on 29 October 2021 and was longlisted for awards by BAFTA and BIFA. Gale has since given interviews with David Lammy on LBC, Mariella Frostrup on Times Radio, and Amelia Gentleman in The Guardian.

Hostile has had a three year impact campaign funded by the UK arm of the Ben & Jerry’s Foundation.

Phase One focused on public awareness and national outreach. The film toured across the UK with screenings and Q&A events, including at the British Film Institute, and culminated in its first parliamentary screening. The campaign also included media engagement and the development of educational and legal resource materials addressing issues such as No Recourse to Public Funds (NRPF).

The film was screened at more than 175 venues nationwide and received a theatrical release through Picturehouse Cinemas, alongside international broadcasts.

Phase Two centred on education and longer-term engagement. Hostile was integrated into school and university curricula at multiple UK institutions, with further expansion reported. A companion short film was produced, and both the feature and the short were subsequently made available for free online, including on YouTube. The film was screened in Parliament for a second time during this phase.

The film was screened across the United Kingdom and internationally in cinemas, organisations, and community venues. As part of an impact campaign, it was shown in Parliament in 2022 at an event hosted by Labour MP Kate Osamor and again in 2026 at an event sponsored by Labour MP Nadia Whittome. It was incorporated into educational curricula, and received distribution along with screenings at festivals worldwide.

== Hostile Impact Campaign Video (2026) ==
In 2026, Sonita Gale directed, wrote and narrated the Hostile Impact Campaign Video, a short follow-up documentary examining developments in UK immigration policy since 2022.

The film revisits themes explored in Gale’s earlier documentary Hostile, which examined the human consequences of the UK’s “hostile environment” policies. The short traces policy developments from the proposed Rwanda asylum deportation scheme under Prime Minister Rishi Sunak, through the Labour Party’s return to government in 2024, and the continued implementation of restrictive immigration frameworks. It also references the rise of Reform UK and what Gale characterises as the mainstreaming of far-right rhetoric within British political discourse.

The short documentary situates UK immigration policy within a broader international context, including intensified enforcement actions by U.S. Immigration and Customs Enforcement (ICE) in the United States and increasingly restrictive border measures across parts of Europe.

The film was released ahead of the second parliamentary screening marking the conclusion of Hostile’s impact campaign. It was conceived as a bridge between past and present work, both editorially and formally, and as an exploration of tone, access, and audience engagement for potential future projects.

== Filmography ==
Film	Credit(s)	Accolades
Andrew Carnegie: Rags to Riches, Power to Peace (2015)	Producer	Best Feature Documentary – Pittsburgh Independent Film Festival; Best Documentary – United International Film Festival; Official Selection – Edinburgh International Film Festival; Official Selection – EyeCatcher Film Festival
International Health Service (2020)	Producer	Grand Jury Award – Oniros Film Awards; Official Selection – Lady Filmmakers Festival
Happy Epidemic (2020)	Producer	Official Selection – The Web Series Filmmaker Showcase 2021; Official Selection – Best Shorts Competition 2021; Official Selection – California Indies 2021; Official Selection – LA Sun Film Fest 2021; Official Selection – Montreal Independent Film Festival 2021; Official Selection – Diversity in Cannes Short Film & Webseries Showcase 2021; Official Selection – Lighthouse International Film Festival 2021; Official Selection – Bilbao Seriesland Web Festival 2021; Official Selection – Sicily Web Fest 2021; Official Selection – First Time Filmmaker – Lift Off Global Network 2021; Official Selection – Copenhagen Web Fest 2021
Hostile (2021)	Director, writer, producer	Longlisted – BAFTA, BAFTA Award for Outstanding Debut by a British Writer, Director or Producer 2022; Longlisted – BIFA, Best Debut Director, Best Documentary and Raindance Discovery Award 2021; Winner, Best Documentary Feature – Filmocracy Fest 2022; Winner, Best Documentary Feature – The Roxbury International Film Festival 2022; Winner – South London Film Festival 2021; Best Documentary Feature Award of Excellence (Special Mention) – The Impact DOCS Awards 2022; Best Indie Feature Film, Honourable Mention – The Best Indie Film Awards 2022; Finalist, Supreme Award & Best Director (International) – Melbourne Documentary Film Festival 2022; Finalist – Catalina Film Festival; Nominee, Best Documentary – British Urban Film Festival 2022; Nominee, Best International Documentary and Overall Audience Favourite – NorthwestFest International Documentary Film Festival 2022; Official Selection – Global Health Film Festival 2022; Official Selection – Naples Human Rights Film Festival 2022; Official Selection – Red Carpet Human Rights Film Festival 2022; Official Selection – DOCtober 2022; Official Selection – Festival des Libertés 2022; Official Selection – New Generations Independent Indian Film Festival 2022; Official Selection – UK Asian Film Festival 2022; Official Selection – Budapest Movie Awards 2022; Official Selection – Manchester Film Festival 2022; Official Selection – ZagrebDox 2022; Official Selection – Berlin Lift-Off Film Festival 2022; Official Selection – Cambridge Film Festival 2021; Official Selection – London Migration Film Festival 2021; Official Selection – Raindance Film Festival 2021
Hostile Impact Campaign Video (2026)	Director, writer, narrator	
