= Titus Lowe =

English-American Bishop (1877-1959)

- Born: 17 December 1877; Bilston, England
- Died: November 1959 (aged 91)
- Education: Ohio Wesleyan University (B.A., M.A.); Western Theological Seminary
- Occupations: pastor, bishop
- Spouse: Anna Bessie Creed (m. 1901)
- Children: two daughters
- Parent(s): William Henry and Anna (Scribbins) Lowe
- Religion: Methodist Episcopal Church, The Methodist Church
- Ordained: 1900
- Congregations served: Pastor: Braddock, Pennsylvania; Calcutta, India; South Fork, Pennsylvania; Cedar Falls, Iowa; Omaha, Nebraska; Episcopal ministry: Singapore; Portland, Oregon; Indianapolis

The Rev. Titus Lowe (17 December 1877 – November 1959) was an English-American bishop of the Methodist Episcopal Church and The Methodist Church, elected in 1924.

== Birth and family ==
Titus Lowe was born in Bilston, England, the son of William Henry and Anna (Scribbins) Lowe, and moved to America in 1892 at the age of 14 with his mother and sisters Annie, Louisa and Mary. His father and older brothers, Thomas and George, had moved to America in 1890, where they lived in Pittsburgh, Pennsylvania, and worked in the area's steel mills. Lowe married Anna Bessie Creed (b. 1880) on October 18, 1901. They had two daughters, Madelyn Bessie Lowe and Evelyn Oldham Lowe, and a son who died in infancy. Anna died in 1911. Lowe married Edith Eglantine Egloff (b. 1876) on January 6, 1913, and had one daughter, Anna Jane Lowe, by that marriage. After Edith's death in 1955, Lowe married Ellen Louise Stoy (1890-1979) on January 8, 1957.

== Education ==
Lowe graduated from Ohio Wesleyan University, earning a B.A. degree in 1900 and an M.A. in 1908. He attended the Western Theological Seminary (now Pittsburgh Theological Seminary) between 1900 and 1902. He was a member of the Sigma Chi fraternity. He also received several honorary doctorates.

== Ordained ministry and missionary service ==
Lowe entered the Pittsburgh Annual Conference of the Methodist Episcopal Church in 1900. He was appointed pastor of the Fourth Street Methodist Church in Braddock, Pennsylvania, a post he held from 1900 to 1903. He then went as a missionary to India, pastoring the Thoburn Methodist Church in Calcutta, 1903–1908.

Lowe returned to the United States in 1908 and was appointed pastor in South Fork, Pennsylvania (1908–09). Then he was appointed, in succession, to the First Methodist Churches of Cedar Falls, Iowa (1909–13) and Omaha, Nebraska (1913–21). In 1921, he was elected corresponding secretary of the Board of Foreign Missions of the Methodist Episcopal Church, holding in this position until elected to the episcopacy.

In 1917–18, Lowe was a lecturer under the auspices of the International Committee of the YMCA in France during World War I. He was elected a delegate to Methodist Episcopal General Conferences (1916–24).

== Episcopal ministry ==
Lowe was elected to the episcopacy of the Methodist Episcopal Church by the 1924 General Conference. He was assigned to the Singapore episcopal area (1924–28). He was then assigned to the Portland, Oregon, Episcopal Area (1928–39) and to the Indianapolis Episcopal Area of The Methodist Church in 1939. His offices were located at 305 Underwriters Bldg. in Indianapolis.

Lowe's accomplishments were many while episcopal Leader in Indiana, including being a charter member of the World Service Commission of the Methodist Church, president of the Methodist Commission on Interdenominational Relations, president of the Methodist Hospital of Indianapolis and president of the Methodist "Council of Bishops".

== Honors ==
Lowe was honored with the D.D. degree (1916) and the LL.D. degree (1926) by the Nebraska Wesleyan University. Ohio Wesleyan gave him the D.D. in 1920. The College of Puget Sound honored him with the L.H.D. in 1931.

Lowe was a 33rd degree mason. He was also named a "Significant Sig" by the national Sigma Chi fraternity.

== Retirement and death ==
Lowe retired from the episcopacy in 1948, and was appointed executive secretary of the Methodist Commission on Overseas Relief for five years. He lived in Indianapolis until his death in November 1959.

== See also ==
- List of bishops of the United Methodist Church
