= Ormiston SWB Academy =

Coordinates: 52.561715°N 2.078104°W

- The Academy's logo

Location
- Dudley Street; Wolverhampton, West Midlands, WV14 0LN; England

Information
- Type: Academy (English school), Secondary school
- Motto: That all pupils will be respectful, responsible learners experiencing a first class education
- Established: 1 September 2009
- Trust: Ormiston Academies Trust
- Department for Education URN: 145008 Tables
- Ofsted: Reports
- Principal: Daniel Mason
- Gender: Mixed
- Age: 11 to 19
- Enrolment: 1187
- Capacity: 1200
- Colour
- Publication: SWB TV
- Website: ormistonswbacademy.org.uk

Ormiston SWB Academy (formerly South Wolverhampton and Bilston Academy) is an academy school (11–18 years) serving the town of Bilston and the southern area of the city of Wolverhampton in the West Midlands of England. On 1 July 2017 South Wolverhampton and Bilston Academy changed its name to Ormiston SWB Academy following a change of sponsor from the City of Wolverhampton Academy Trust to Ormiston Academies Trust (OAT).

It opened in September 2009 to replace Parkfield High School, which occupied a building at Bilston town centre and another at Lawnswood Avenue in the Lanesfield area of Wolverhampton. However, in September 2012, SWB Academy moved to a £25 million new build in Bilston.

In November 2021, the academy was graded ‘Good’ by Ofsted for the first time in its history.
