= Bilston Tree =

Tree in Victoria, Australia

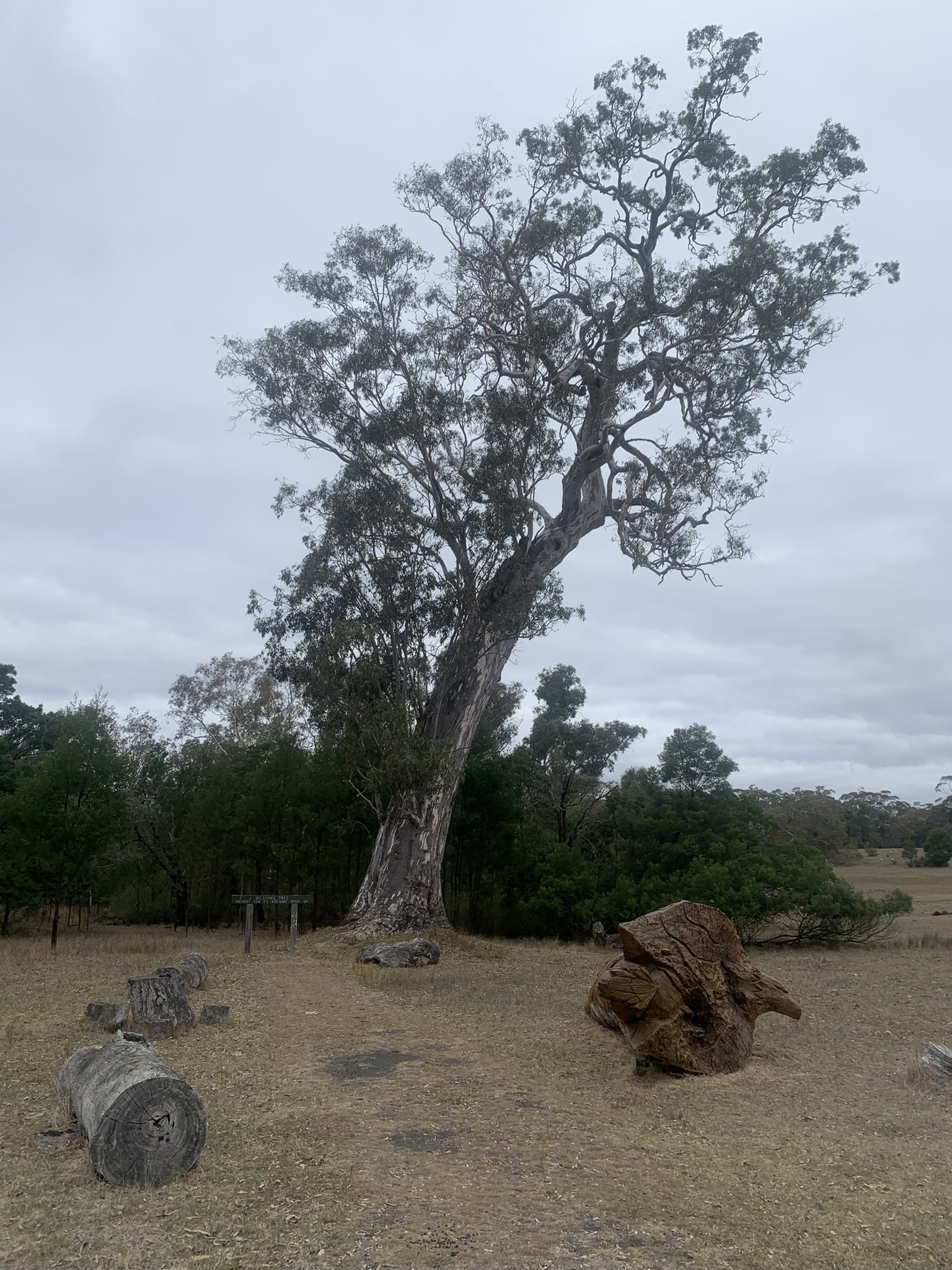
- The tree in 2024

- Location of the tree in Victoria
- Interactive map of Bilston Tree
- Species: Eucalyptus camaldulensis
- Location: Brimboal, Shire of Glenelg, Grampians, Victoria, Australia
- Coordinates: 37°22′37″S 141°19′33″E
- Height: 32.4 m (106 ft) (2024)
- Girth: 8.12 m (26.6 ft) (2024)
- Diameter: 258 cm (102 in) (2024, calculated)
- Volume of trunk: 26 m^{3} (920 cu ft) (1961)

The Bilston Tree or Bilston's Tree is a large river red gum (Eucalyptus camaldulensis) growing near Brimboal, in the Shire of Glenelg, in the Grampians region of western Victoria, Australia. The tree was saved from being felled in June 1961 for railway sleepers by local community action led by Bill Flentje, a district forester at Casterton. Access to the tree is via an easement off Glenmia Road.

== Description ==
Negotiations between the Forests Commission Victoria (FCV) with the landowners, Mr Tomas Henry Bilston and his brother Mr John Wheeler Bilston, as well as Mr Lance Thyear from Pyramid Sawmills, led to the purchase the tree on 6 March 1962 for A$70 as compensation for the loss of revenue. The Bilston brothers donated a small patch of land (1 acre, 1 rood, 26 perches) plus a right of carriageway. The land was subsequently declared reserved forest on 28 May 1964 by the FCV.

In 1961, the tree was thought be c. 400 years old and had a circumference of 7.26 metres (23 ft 10 in) (measured at breast height). The total tree height was 41 metres (134 ft) with a log length of 10 metres (34 ft) giving an under bark volume of 26 cubic metres (910 cu ft).

The Bilston Tree is commonly claimed to have germinated in 1200 CE making it over 800 years old, but there is no evidence for this and seems very unlikely. The Bilston Tree is often claimed to be the world's largest river red gum but it is not. However, the unique thing about the Bilston Tree is its clear unbranched trunk, with very little taper, up some 40 feet. Estimates in 1961 suggest that 910 cubic feet or 25.7 m3 of timber could be sawn from the tree, which is enough for over 300 railway sleepers. This probably makes the Bilston Tree the largest “merchantable” river red gum.

The tree was remeasured by a trained forester in June 2024 and had a circumference of 8.12 metres (26.6 ft) (at 1.3 metres (4 ft 3 in) above the ground) and a height of 32.4 metres (106 ft). Reliable measurements are hard to obtain, but over the 63 year period from 1961 to 2024, the Bilston Tree grew a total of 86 centimetres (34 in) in girth. This equates to an annual increment in its circumference of 1.36 centimetres (0.54 in) per year (or 0.42 centimetres (0.17 in) per year in diameter).

The crown is thinning and showing signs of senescence while there is some epicormic growth from the lower trunk. Unlike many other old river red gums, there is no major swelling at the base or large burls. Some large branches broke from the tree in 1973 and again in 2013. the apparent reduction in height from 1961 to 2024 can be explained by the loss of these branches in the crown. The more recent branch has been carved by local artists.

The Bilston Tree is recorded in a non-statutory register of trees by the National Trusts of Australia and is included in a non-statutory heritage list by the Shire of Glenelg.

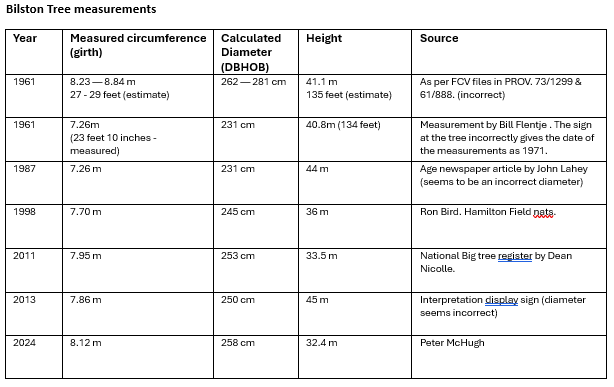
Bilston Tree Measurements 1961 - 2024 (Note: The 1971 records shown on the sign near the tree are incorrect. They actually relate to 1961 as measured by Bill Flentje (e.g. in 1961 the tree had a girth of 7.26 m (23 ft 10 in) and was 41 m (134 ft) tall). The figures in the original 1961 FCV file note were "estimates" and so are also incorrect.)

== See also ==
- List of individual trees
- List of named Eucalyptus trees
