= Parkfield High School =

Location
- Wolverhampton Road East; Wolverhampton, West Midlands, WV4 6AP; England; 52.56254°N 2.11793°W

Information
- Type: Community School
- Local authority: Wolverhampton
- Specialist: Language
- Department for Education URN: 104393 Tables
- Gender: Coeducational
- Age: 11 to 18
- Website: Parkfield High

Parkfield High School was a secondary school located in Wolverhampton, West Midlands, England.

Opened in April 1962, it was situated in the Parkfield area which has been administratively part of Wolverhampton since 1966, having previously been on the northern edge of the Urban District of Coseley. The school served the neighbourhoods of Lanesfield, Woodcross, and Ettingshall. It was built during the 1960s, with extensions following during the 1970s, and around 1980 the main building was extensively renovated due to mining subsidence. The school replaced the former Manor Secondary School near Woodcross, Coseley.

The last headmaster before the school was succeeded by South Wolverhampton and Bilston Academy was Mr Arthur Thompson, who retired in July 2009. The two sites which Parkfields maintained joined on the Wolverhampton Road East site from September 2009. The school closed on 31 August 2009.

== Notable alumni ==
- Spencer Dunkley, first British basketball player to win contract in NBA (Indiana Pacers).
- Bill Etheridge, UK Independence Party MEP
