= Kidson Island =

Island in Antarctica

- Location within Antarctica

Geography
- Location: Antarctica
- Coordinates: 67°12′S 61°11′E

Administration
- Administered under the Antarctic Treaty System

Demographics
- Population: Uninhabited

Kidson Island is an island 1 kilometre (0.5 nmi) long, lying 28 kilometres (15 nmi) north-northeast of Byrd Head, Antarctica. It was discovered in February 1931 by the British Australian New Zealand Antarctic Research Expedition under Mawson, and named by him for Edward Kidson.

== See also ==
- List of Antarctic and sub-Antarctic islands
