= Shannon and the Clams =

American indie garage punk band

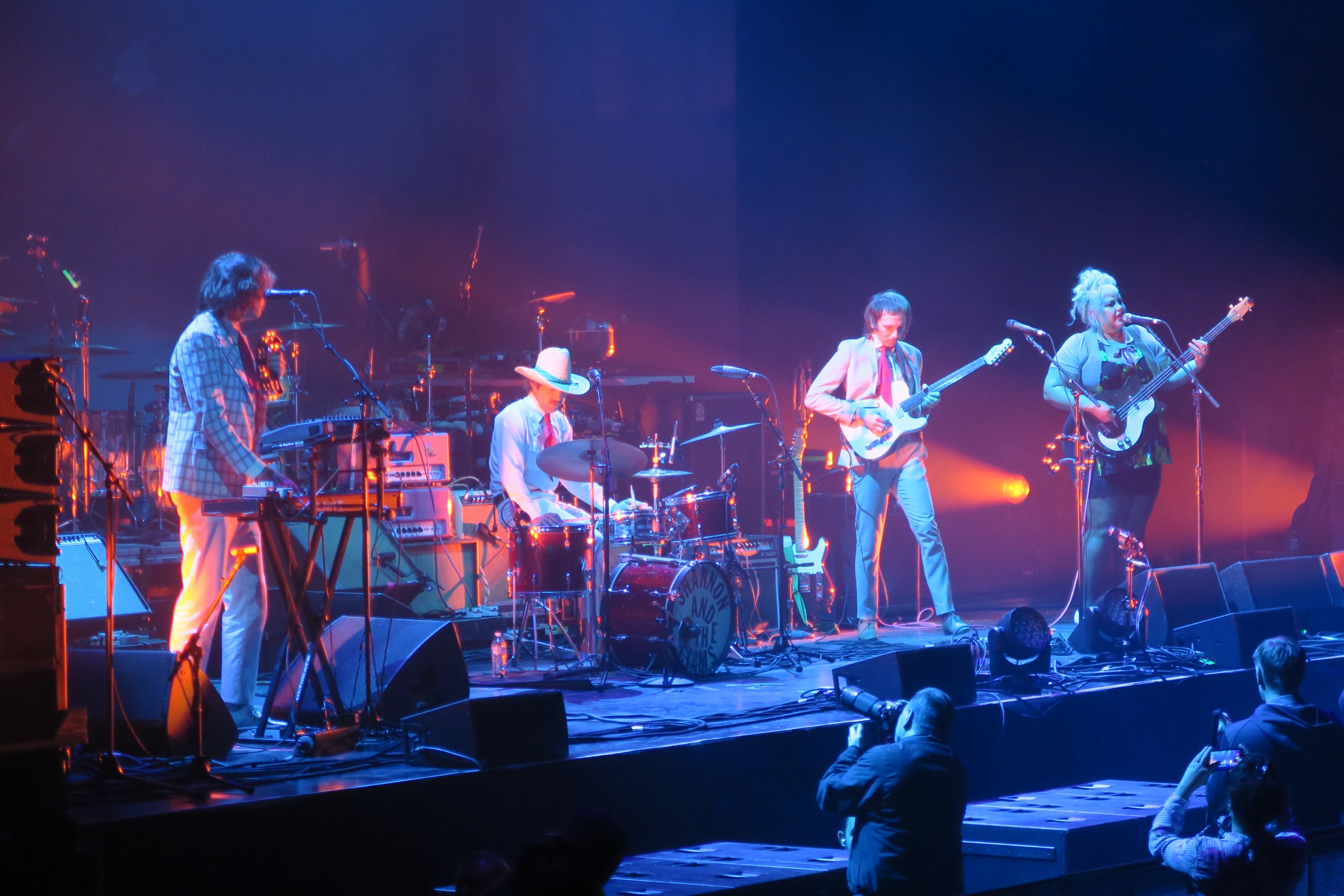
- Shannon and the Clams live at Moda Center, Portland, Oregon, November 22, 2019. From left to right: Will Sprott, Nate Mahan, Cody Blanchard and Shannon Shaw.

Background information
- Origin: Oakland, California, United States
- Genres: Garage punk; rockabilly; doo-wop
- Years active: 2007–present
- Labels: 1-2-3-4 Go! Records, Hardly Art, Easy Eye Sound
- Members: Shannon Shaw; Cody Blanchard; Nate Mahan; Will Sprott
- Website: shannonandtheclams.com

Shannon and the Clams is an indie garage punk quartet based in Oakland, California. Known for a vintage sound that incorporates elements of doo-wop, classic R&B, garage psych, and surf, Shannon and the Clams has drawn comparisons to both Buddy Holly and 1960s girl groups. They are also said to love "music from '50s oldies to '80s punk".

== History ==
The band includes vocals from bassist Shannon Shaw, guitarist Cody Blanchard, and keyboardist Will Sprott, along with drums by Nate Mahan. Shaw and Blanchard met at the California College of the Arts, where they began performing together.

Shaw has released a solo album with Easy Eye Sound and is also a member of queercore punk outfit Hunx and His Punx. Sprott is very active outside the band releasing solo records and touring with Shana Cleveland.

Shannon and the Clams' debut album, I Wanna Go Home, was released in 2009. In 2011, the group followed up with their sophomore effort, Sleep Talk. Their third album, Dreams in the Rat House, was released in May 2013.

Their album Gone by the Dawn is described by Still in Rock as "the most beautiful manifestation in recent years of what I would call the 'Elvis Presley culture'".

Released in 2018, Onion was Shannon and the Clams' first release on Dan Auerbach's Easy Eye Sound label. Auerbach also produced the album. Their sixth album, Year of the Spider, was released in 2021.

Their seventh album, The Moon is in the Wrong Place, was released in 2024. All of the songs were heavily inspired by the death of Shaw's fiancé Joe Haener, who died in a car accident in 2022 just weeks before the pair's wedding. The name of the album came from something that Haener had said to Shaw shortly before his death during a conversation about astrology.

== Reception ==
A reviewer at Still in Rock stated that their "shows are among the best in the world, with an inexhaustible spirit and a musical style with no equivalent. Its influence on the independent scene is one of the greatest, together with Ty Segall and very few others."

A reviewer at Punknews.org wrote that Shannon and the Clams has the "sound of a prom band in 1964 getting dosed with acid and having the sweetest lovelorn freak out. Imagine a brawling Etta James, backed up by the 13th Floor Elevators singing Shangri La's tunes." The Chicago Reader's Jessica Hopper described Shannon and the Clams as "something from a John Waters lucid dream... complete with horny teenage anthems that walk the line between greasy, frantic 50s rock 'n' roll and innocent, hip-swinging 60s pop."

In an effusive review of Onion, Allison Wolfe wrote: "Reminiscent of the Collins Kids, both Shannon and Cody's voices mingle and soar, and I often can't tell their beautiful articulations apart. No matter – this is a gorgeously sincere and infectious body of work that I can't put down."

== Band members ==
- Shannon Shaw – vocals, bass
- Cody Blanchard – vocals, guitar
- Nate Mahan – drums
- Will Sprott – vocals, keyboards

Guest Members

- Eric Moore - drums (Australian Tour 2022)
- Chris Icasiano - drums
- Garett Goddard - drums

== Discography ==
=== Studio albums ===
Album	Year
I Wanna Go Home	2009
Sleep Talk	2011
Dreams in the Rat House	2013
Gone by the Dawn	2015
Onion	2018
Year of the Spider	2021
The Moon is in the Wrong Place	2024

=== Singles and EPs ===
EPs	Year
Hunk Hunt	2010
Paddy's Birthday	2010
...Ruin Christmas	2010

Singles	Year
"Gremlins Crawl" / "White Rabbit"	2012
"Ozma / Angel Baby"	2012
"Ozma / Muppet Babies"	2012
"Mama"	2014
"Mines of lo"	2017
