= Hostiles =

Hostiles may refer to:

- Hostiles (film), a 2017 film
- Hostiles (Lost), a group of characters in the television series Lost
- One of the classes in the North Korean Songbun system

== See also ==
- Hostile (disambiguation)
