= Onion (Arendt) =

The onion metaphor is a metaphor used by the philosopher Hannah Arendt in The Origins of Totalitarianism (1951). It is used to provide an example of the underlying structure that characterizes the organization of totalitarianism. Arendt contrasts this structure with the pyramid-like structures of autocracy or tyranny, and uses it to illustrate how totalitarianism spreads through different layers of society.

== Background ==
Hannah Arendt was a philosopher accustomed to using metaphors. Among other things, she advocated for their use in philosophical reflection in her Journal of Thoughts. In The Origins of Totalitarianism, Arendt explored the question of totalitarianism – how these types of regimes form, evolve, exist, and perish. She also examined the differences between totalitarianism and other forms of political systems, such as autocratic regimes.

== Metaphor ==
In this context, Arendt uses the metaphor of the onion to represent the structure of totalitarian systems. This metaphor illustrates an organized structure centered around a central point, the leader of the totalitarian system. She contrasts this structure with other types, such as the pyramid-like structures of autocracy or tyranny. This depiction reveals that totalitarianism evolves in "waves", spreading through different layers of society. The closer one is to the center, the more radicalized they are, whereas those closer to the periphery are less radicalized. With this example, Arendt also exposes the dual nature of totalitarian organizations, possessing two faces—one presented to the external world, appearing normal, and another turned inward, radicalized.

The metaphor is described by researchers like Sophie Schulze as follows:

For Arendt, the onion structure designates two distinct things: one, that power diffuses from the center to the periphery (centrifugal movement); the other, that each circle maintains itself through the balance between two opposing forces.

This structure also enables totalitarian regimes to absorb shocks from the external reality of the system. Each layer of the onion absorbs a bit of the shockwave, ultimately rendering the contact with external reality harmless. This occurs despite the contradictions with the practical and scientific lies propagated by totalitarian regimes.

== Legacy ==
The use of the metaphor was deemed relevant when discussing, among other things, the USSR under Stalin, Nazi Germany, and Imperial Japan. The notion that this structure helps totalitarian regimes avoid 'external reality shocks' is also considered an important concept in psychology.

== See also ==
- Onion model
