= Dennis Gordon (footballer) =

English footballer

Personal information
- Full name: Dennis William Gordon (Note: Some sources spell his name with one "n", but the index of births confirms there to be two. His birth was registered in the district of Wolverhampton, of which Bilston formed part; sources exist for both as his birthplace.)
- Date of birth: 7 June 1924
- Place of birth: Bilston, England
- Date of death: May 1998 (aged 73)
- Place of death: Jersey
- Height: 5 ft 11 in (1.80 m)
- Position: Outside right

Senior career*
Years	Team	Apps	(Gls)
193?–1942	Headington United		
1946–1947	Oxford City		
1947–1952	West Bromwich Albion	27	(10)
1952–1961	Brighton & Hove Albion	277	(62)
1961–1953	Guildford City		
1963–1966	Tunbridge Wells Rangers		
- * Club domestic league appearances and goals

Dennis William Gordon (7 June 1924 – May 1998) was an English professional footballer who scored 72 goals from 302 Football League appearances playing for West Bromwich Albion and Brighton & Hove Albion, where he spent the majority of his career.

== Life and career ==
Gordon was born in Bilston, Staffordshire. He attended Southfield School in Oxford, and played first-team football for Headington United from the age of 14. After serving with the RAF during the Second World War, he returned to Oxford, took a job as an audit clerk in the Borough Treasurer's department, and resumed his football career with Oxford City. He was also on the books of Tottenham Hotspur as an amateur, and played for their reserves. When that registration expired at the end of the season, West Bromwich Albion signed him on amateur forms; two days later, he received a letter from Tottenham Hotspur offering him terms for the new season. He soon made his senior debut, and over the next four and a half years he scored 10 goals from 27 league appearances. At the end of the 1951–52 season, he was placed on the transfer list.

Gordon signed for Brighton & Hove Albion for a £3,500 fee. He was not a regular in his first season with the club, but missed only nine league matches over the following five years, and scored twelve goals as Brighton won the 1957–58 Third Division South title. He shared the outside-right position with Mike Tiddy for the next two seasons, and was released on a free transfer in 1961. He played non-league football for a further five years, with Guildford City and Tunbridge Wells Rangers.

He returned to local government work in Brighton Corporation's Housing Department. Gordon died in Jersey in May 1998 at the age of 73.
