= Bilston School of Art =

Art school in Bilston, England

Bilston Technical School
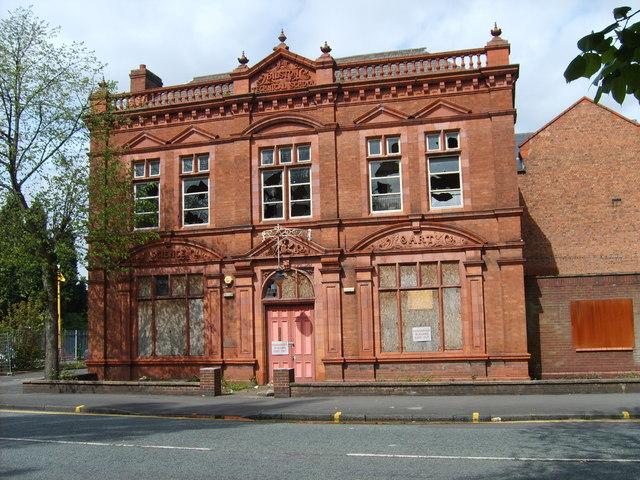
- Bilston Technical School, disused and boarded up
- Interactive map of the Bilston Technical School area

General information
- Status: Locally listed
- Type: School of Art
- Location: Mount Pleasant, Bilston, England
- Coordinates: 52.5682°N 2.0728°W
- Groundbreaking: 1896
- Completed: 1897

Design and construction
- Civil engineer: Captain Wilson

Bilston School of Art was built in 1897 on Mount Pleasant, Bilston to commemorate the Diamond Jubilee of Queen Victoria. It was designed by town engineer, Captain Wilson, who reputedly based the design very closely on an institution in Glasgow. The building falls within the Bilston Town Centre Conservation Area.
