= Bilston Town Hall =

Municipal building in Bilston, West Midlands, England

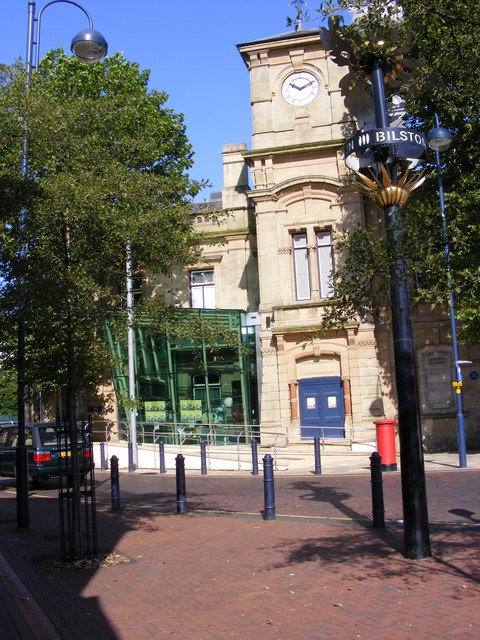
- Bilston Town Hall

- Shown in the West Midlands
- 52.5664°N 2.0745°W
- Location: Church Street, Bilston

History
- Built: 1873

Site notes
- Architect(s): Bidlake and Lovatt
- Architectural style: Classical style

Listed Building – Grade II
- Designated: 31 March 1992
- Reference no.: 1201834

Bilston Town Hall is a municipal facility on Church Street in Bilston, West Midlands, England. It is a Grade II listed building.

== History ==
The building was commissioned to replace an earlier timber-framed town hall in Lichfield Street. Edward Pugh, treasurer of the local board of health, laid the foundation stone for the new building on 2 April 1872. The new building, which was designed by architects Bidlake and Lovatt of Wolverhampton in the Classical style and built by a Mr Nelson from Dudley for £6,000, was officially opened on 14 June 1873. An extension incorporating a larger free library and a new reading room in the same architectural style as the original building was added in 1880. A clock, by John Smith & Sons of Derby, was installed in the tower over the main entrance in 1881.

The ballroom on the first floor was, in 1910, leased to Joseph Woods as a cinema; after he built Wood's Palace on the other side of the road, the ballroom reverted to community use. The town hall became the meeting place of Bilston Urban District Council in 1894 and of the Bilston Municipal Borough Council in 1933. The Princess Royal visited Bilston Town Hall in 1946 shortly after the Second World War.

The town hall ceased to be the local seat of government when Bilston was incorporated into the new county Borough of Wolverhampton in 1966. However, the town hall continued to be used by the housing department of Wolverhampton Metropolitan Borough Council for another 30 years until it closed in 1996.

In April 2005, work began on a refurbishment program for the building, including restoration of the grand ballroom for use by the Gazebo Theatre Company, new offices for Wolverhampton Homes, repairs to the roof, stonework, windows, and clock, and a new glass entrance. The venue also took possession of a newly restored pipe organ, designed and built by John Compton, which had been removed from the Lyric Cinema in Wellingborough, Northamptonshire, when it changed ownership in the late 1960s and had instead been installed at Weavers Road School in Wellingborough. Although it had been used for concerts at the school in the 1980s, it subsequently languished there for many years until it was acquired for Bilston Town Hall in 2007. Following the completion of the works, which cost £2.5 million, Councilor Christine Mills, the Mayor of Wolverhampton, officially reopened the town hall on 19 September 2008.

In 2013, the town hall also became the central hub of "Talent Match Black Country", an organization that provides support to young unemployed people in the local area.
