= Onion (album) =

Studio album by Shannon and the Clams
- Released: February 16, 2018
- Studios: Easy Eye Sound (Nashville, Tennessee)
- Length: 41:05
- Label: Easy Eye
- Producer: Dan Auerbach

Shannon and the Clams chronology
| Gone by the Dawn (2015) | Onion (2018) | Year of the Spider (2021) |

Professional ratings
Aggregate scores
| Source | Rating |
|---|---|
| AnyDecentMusic? | 6.9/10 |
| Metacritic | 81/100 |
Review scores
| Source | Rating |
| AllMusic | 3.5/5 stars |
| American Songwriter | 4/5 stars |
| Loud and Quiet | 6/10 |
| Slant Magazine | 3/5 stars |

Onion is the fifth studio album by American band Shannon and the Clams. It was released on February 16, 2018 under Easy Eye Records.

The album was partially inspired by, and pays tribute to, the 2016 Oakland Ghost Ship warehouse fire.

== Production ==
The album was recorded over a ten day period in January 2017 at producer Dan Auerbach's Easy Eye Sound Studio in Nashville, Tennessee.

== Release ==
Shannon and the Clams announced the release of their fifth studio album on December 7, 2017.

=== Music videos ===
On December 8, 2017, the music video to "The Boy" was released. Directed by Ryan Daniel Brown, it features vocalist Cody Blanchard travelling along a country road. Andrea Domanick from Vice said the song is "a sparkling, hook-laden track that immediately gets under your skin with its wall-of-sound chorus, rife with crisp guitar strums, cascading riffs, and raw harmonies led by vocalist-guitarist Cody Blanchard."

On February 1, 2018, the second music video "Backstreets" was released. Blanchard explained the song: "It was one of the last things we wrote for the record. It had a completely different hook at first and nobody liked it except our keyboard player Will [Sprott] and we tabled it, but Will saw promise there and really wanted it to make the album. At the final rehearsals before leaving for Nashville, he suggested we just keep the verses and mash the song together with this other glammy hook I had written (the half-time ‘takin’ the backstreets…’ part) that needed verses to go with it and we all loved the weird combo."

== Critical reception ==
Onion was met with "generally favorable" reviews from critics. At Metacritic, which assigns a weighted average rating out of 100 to reviews from mainstream publications, this release received an average score of 81 based on 8 reviews. Aggregator Album of the Year gave the release a 71 out of 100 based on a critical consensus of 7 reviews.

Mark Deming of AllMusic said of the release: "Onion is mature and contemplative compared to Shannon & the Clams' earlier efforts, but it's music that comes from a place of celebration and love, and these songs will make you dance and sing along". Hal Horowitz from American Songwriter gave the album four out of five stars, explaining "The 13 tracks sprint to a conservative 42-minute finish and the styles, although clearly retro, are varied enough to make the set seem even shorter. The production is sharp, focused and plays to the band’s strengths without seeming clichéd or a parody of the classic pop the band obviously idolizes."

== Track listing ==
| No. | Title | Length |
|---|---|---|
| 1. | "The Boy" | 3:02 |
| 2. | "It's Gonna Go Away" | 3:11 |
| 3. | "Backstreets" | 3:26 |
| 4. | "If You Could Know" | 1:52 |
| 5. | "I Never Wanted Love" | 3:39 |
| 6. | "Onion" | 2:46 |
| 7. | "Did You Love Me" | 3:32 |
| 8. | "Love Strike" | 2:47 |
| 9. | "I Leave Again" | 3:09 |
| 10. | "Tryin'" | 3:57 |
| 11. | "Tell Me When You Leave" | 2:22 |
| 12. | "Strange Wind" | 3:21 |
| 13. | "Don't Close Your Eyes" | 4:01 |
