= Brimboal =

- Town
- Coordinates: 37°23′S 141°24′E
- Country: Australia
- State: Victoria
- LGA: Shire of Glenelg

Government
  - State electorate: South-West Coast
  - Federal division: Wannon

Population
  - Total: 4 (2016 census)
- Postcode: 3312

Brimboal is a small inland town near the Dergholm State Park in Victoria, Australia.
