= Sarah Bilston =

British writer

Sarah Bilston is a British author and professor of English literature at Trinity College, Hartford. Bilston was born in Suffolk and studied at University College London and Somerville College, Oxford. She currently resides in Connecticut with her husband and three children. She has written five books: The Awkward Age in Women’s Popular Fiction, 1850-1900, The Promise of the Suburbs: A Victorian History in Literature and Culture, and two novels, Bed Rest and Sleepless Nights. The Hunt for the Lost Orchid: A Story of Victorian Plunder and Obsession, was published on May 6, 2025.

== Works ==
Bed Rest tells the story of Quinn ‘Q’ Boothroyd, an English lawyer in New York who must go on bed rest for two months before the birth of her first child. It was published in May 2006 by HarperCollins (US) and March 2007 by Sphere (UK).

The sequel, Sleepless Nights, was published in December 2008.

The Awkward Age in Women’s Popular Fiction, 1850-1900: Girls and the Transition to Womanhood was published in 2004 by Oxford University Press.

The Promise of the Suburbs: A Victorian History in Literature and Culture was published in 2019 by Yale University Press.

The Lost Orchid: A Story of Victorian Plunder and Obsession was published in 2025 by Harvard University Press.
