= Onion River =

Onion River may refer to a waterway in the United States:

- Onion River (Minnesota)
- Onion River, a tributary of the St. Regis River in New York
- Onion River (Sheboygan River), a tributary of the Sheboygan River in Wisconsin
- Onion River, a tributary of Lake Superior in Wisconsin

== See also ==
- Winooski River in Vermont, from the Abenaki word for "onion"
