= George Onions =

English Victoria Cross recipient (1883-1944)

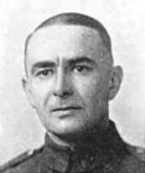
- Born: 2 March 1883; Bilston, Staffordshire, England
- Died: 2 April 1944 (aged 61); Birmingham, England
- Burial place: Quinton Cemetery, Birmingham
- Military career
- Allegiance: United Kingdom
- Branch: British Army
- Rank: Captain
- Units: 3rd Hussars; Devonshire Regiment; Rifle Brigade; Royal Warwickshire Regiment
- Conflicts: First World War; Anglo-Irish War; World War II
- Awards: Victoria Cross
- Other work: Police officer

George Onions VC (2 March 1883 – 2 April 1944) was an English recipient of the Victoria Cross, the highest and most prestigious award for gallantry in the face of the enemy that can be awarded to British and Commonwealth forces.

== Biography ==
Onions was born in Bilston, Staffordshire. He had a varied early life working in mining and as a commercial traveller. He spent three years in Australia and at the start of the War was an Iron and Steel Merchant living in Scotland and married with a son. On the declaration of War he enlisted with the 3rd Hussars and was involved in the Easter Rising in Dublin in 1916.

Onions was commissioned into The Rifle Brigade in September 1916. In December 1916 he was involved in a fracas in a London restaurant. He was found to be absent without leave and was court martialed and cashiered. Given the shortage of experienced junior officers this would seem to be unduly harsh. Most Commanding Officers preferred to deal with junior officers' misdemeanours in house. There were fewer than 60 cashierings in the entire war. There may have been other reasons why 2Lt Onions was dealt with so severely.

Onions immediately reenlisted as a private in the Devonshire Regiment. He was determined to redeem himself and insisted on returning to the Front as soon as possible. He was back in France by April 1917.

Onions was 35 years old, and a Lance-Corporal in the 1st Battalion, The Devonshire Regiment, during the First World War when the following deed took place for which he was awarded the VC.

On the foggy morning of 22 August 1918, south of Achiet-le-Petit, France, Lance-Corporal Onions had been sent out with Private Henry Eades to make contact with the battalion on their right flank when they saw the enemy advancing in large numbers to counter-attack the positions gained the previous day. Seizing the opportunity, they boldly placed themselves on the flank of the advancing enemy and opened fire. When the enemy were about 100 yards from them the line wavered and some hands were thrown up, whereupon Lance-Corporal Onions rushed forward and, helped by his comrade, took about 200 of the enemy prisoner. He then formed them up in column of fours and marched them back to his company commander.

Private Eades was only awarded the Distinguished Conduct Medal and died of wounds that he received only a few days later.

On his application Onions had his commissioned restored into the Rifle Brigade in August 1919. However, it was an honorary appointment as he had to resign the commission on the same day. Like many temporary gentlemen Onions found life difficult after the War. He served in the Auxiliary Division of the Royal Irish Constabulary. He lost two jobs due to neglect and in June 1925 was changed with fraud – namely bouncing a cheque for £5. He was treated leniently due to his military service and previous good record. In 1939 he was commissioned a captain in the Royal Warwickshire Regiment for National Defence, but resigned his commission in 1941.

He was killed in a motoring accident in 1944.

His Victoria Cross is displayed at The Keep Military Museum, Dorchester, Dorset, England.
