= Charles Kidson =

New Zealand art teacher, artist, craftsman, sculptor

Charles Kidson (7 November 1867–2 October 1908) was a New Zealand art teacher, artist, craftsman and sculptor. He was born in Bilston, Staffordshire, England on 7 November 1867 and died in Christchurch New Zealand on 2 October 1908.

He was a leading figure in the Canterbury Arts & Crafts movement along with Leonard Booth and Francis Shurrock.
