= Bilston =

Market town in the West Midlands, England

Coordinates: 52.566°N 2.073°W

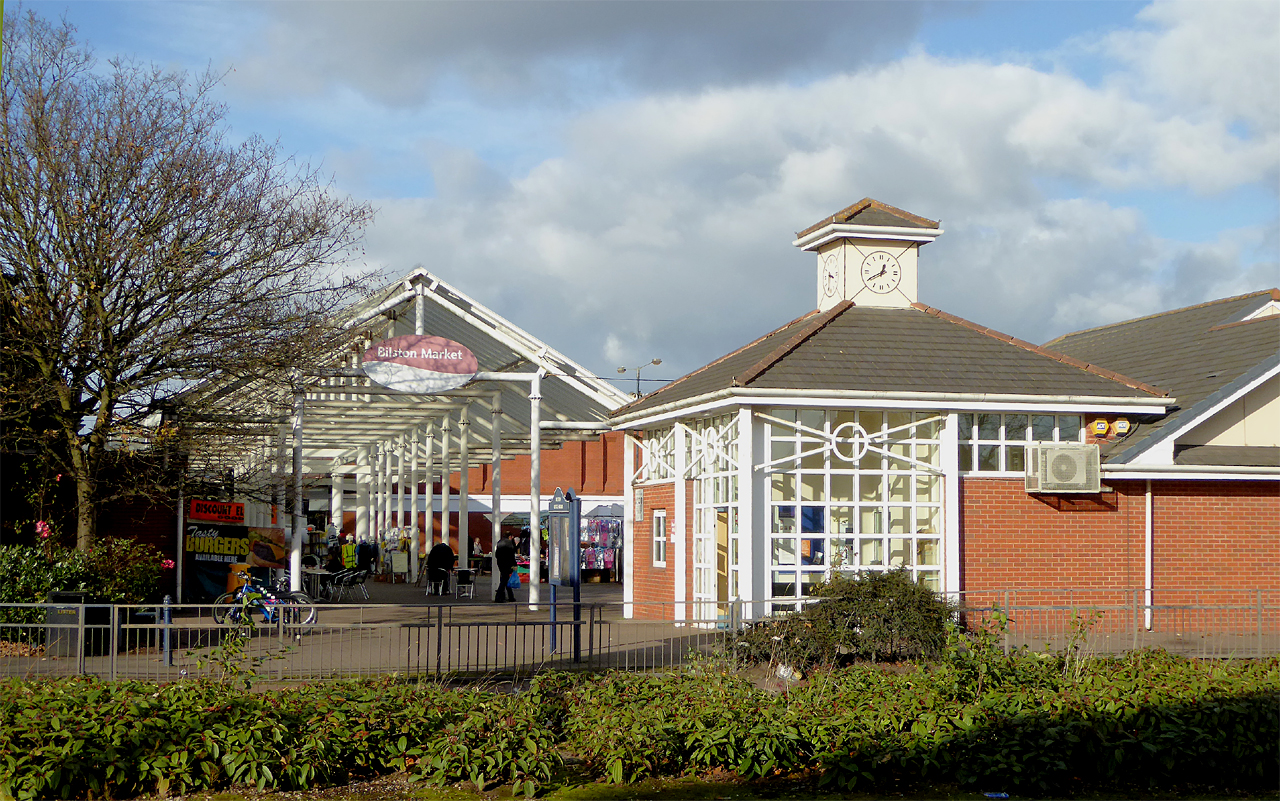
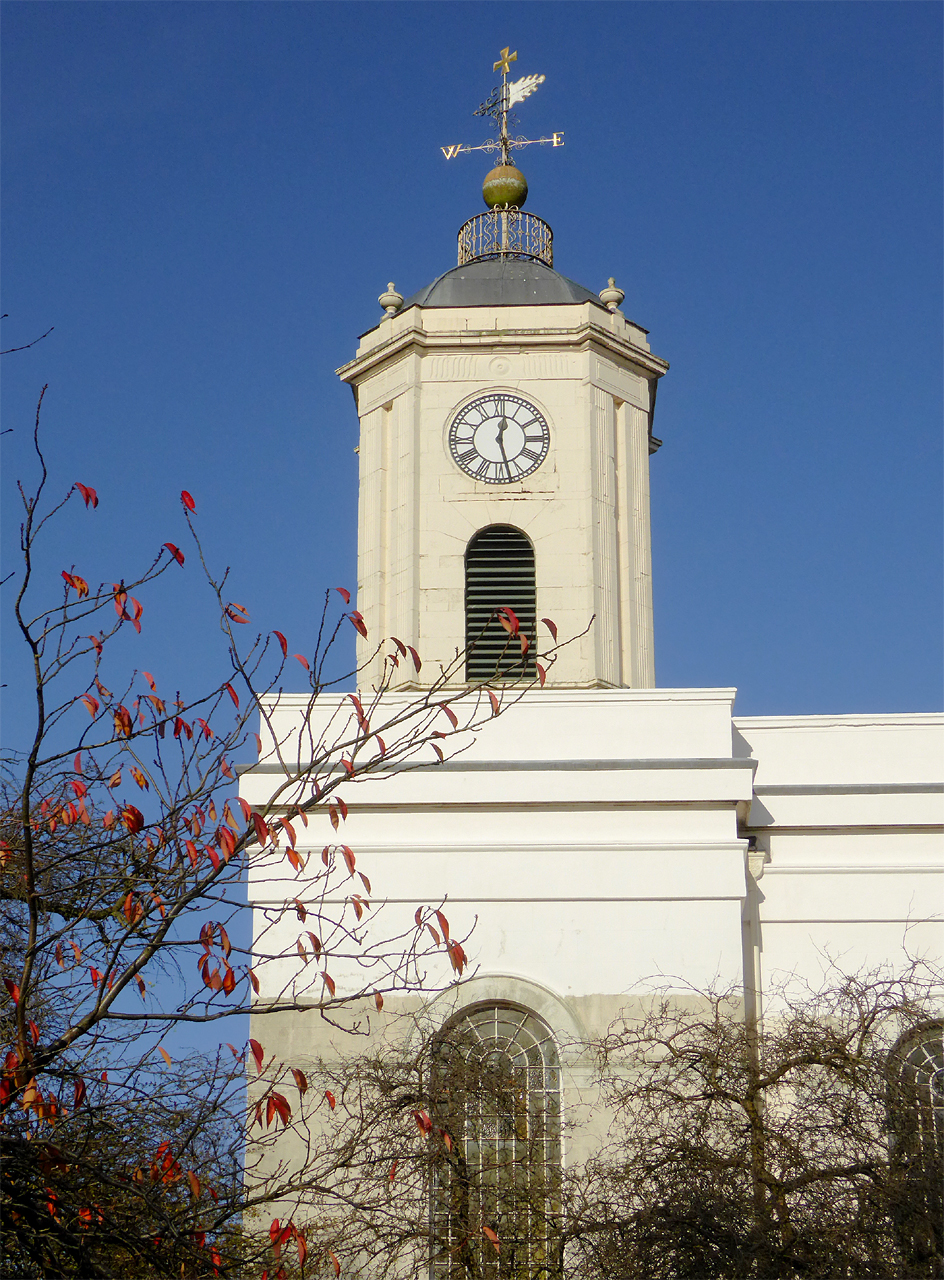
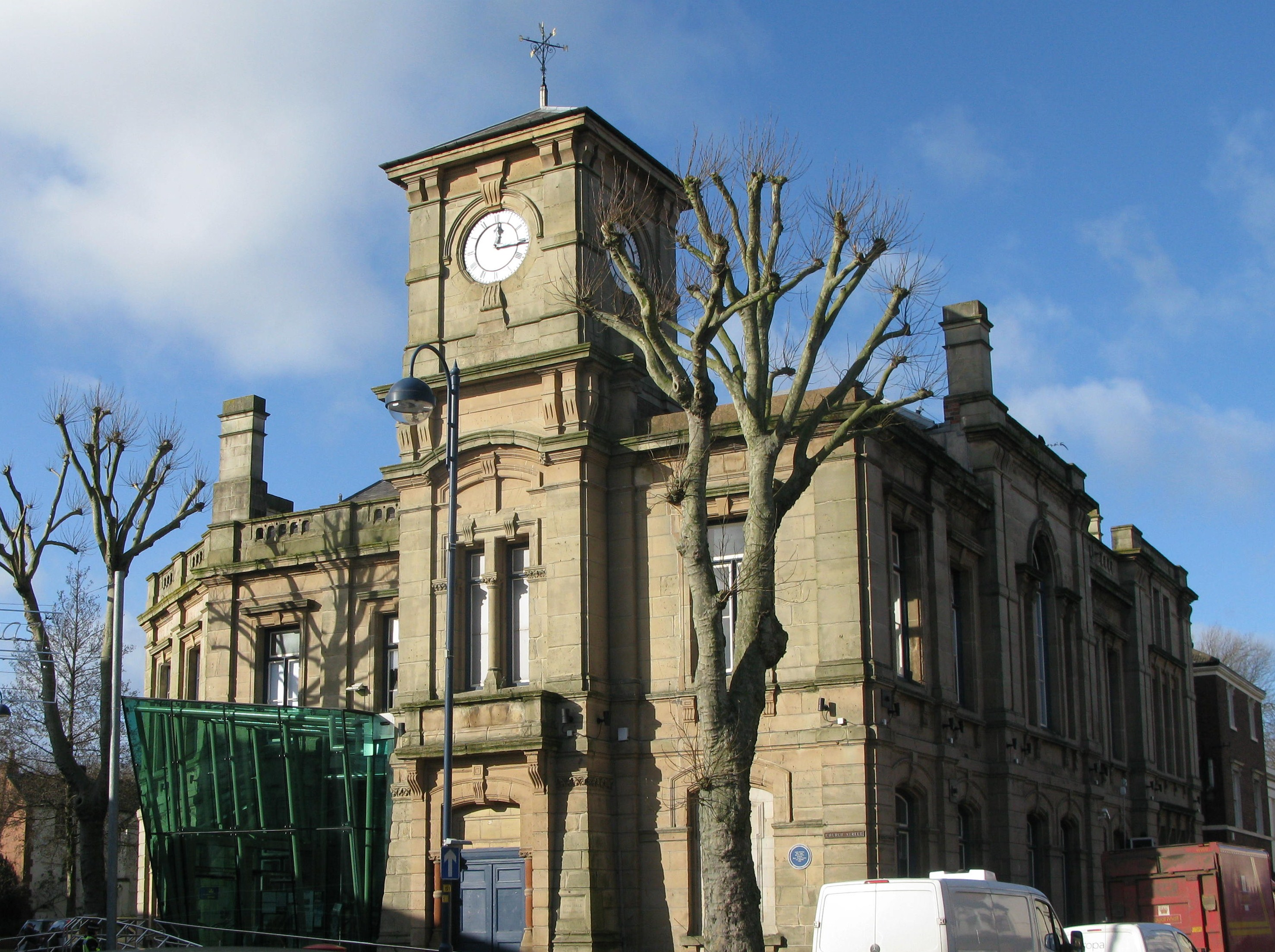
- Top: Bilston Market entrance. Lower: St Leonard's Church, Town Hall

- Location within the West Midlands
- Population: 25,576 (2011.Wards)
- OS grid reference: SO951964
- Metropolitan borough: Wolverhampton
- Metropolitan county: West Midlands
- Region: West Midlands
- Country: England
- Sovereign state: United Kingdom
- Areas of the town: List: Bradley (Village); Ettingshall (Part); Lanesfield; The Lunt; Woodcross
- Post town: BILSTON
- Postcode district: WV14
- Dialling code: 01902
- Police: West Midlands
- Fire: West Midlands
- Ambulance: West Midlands
- UK Parliament: Wolverhampton South East

Bilston is a market town in the City of Wolverhampton in the West Midlands, England. Historically in Staffordshire, Bilston is in the Black Country, 2.5 miles (4 kilometres) south east of Wolverhampton city centre and close to the borders of Sandwell and Walsall. The town was known for enamelling from the mid-17th century, and is a former coal and iron mining district. Iron works dominated in Victorian times and the area became a centre for steel production. The town had a population of 34,639 at the 2021 Census.

== History ==
Bilston was first referred to in AD 985 as Bilsatena when Wolverhampton was granted to Wulfrun then in 996 as Bilsetnatun in the grant charter of St. Mary's Church (now St. Peter's Collegiate Church, Wolverhampton). Bilsetnatun can be interpreted as meaning the settlement (ton) of the folk (saetan) of the ridge (bill). It is mentioned in the Domesday Book as a village called Billestune.

Historically in Staffordshire, Bilston was a largely rural area until extensively developed for factories and coal mining in the 19th century.

In 1866 Bilston became a civil parish. Bilston Urban District Council was formed under the Local Government Act 1894 covering the ancient parish of Bilston. The urban district was granted a royal charter in 1933, becoming a municipal borough and Alderman Herbert Beach its Mayor. Between 1920 and 1966, the council replaced most of the 19th-century terraced houses with rented modern houses and flats on developments like Stowlawn, the Lunt, and Bunker's Hill. By 1964 there were more than 6,000 council houses.

On 1 April 1966 the Borough of Bilston was abolished, with most of its territory incorporated into the County Borough of Wolverhampton (see History of West Midlands), although parts of Bradley in the east of the town were merged into Walsall borough and part went to West Bromwich. The parish was also abolished on 1 April 1966 and merged with Wolverhampton, Walsall and West Bromwich. In 1961 the parish had a population of 33,067.

Bilston Town Hall, dating from 1872, has now been refurbished and re-opened. It had been derelict for more than a decade after Wolverhampton Council discontinued its use as housing offices, but now operates as a venue for events, conferences, performances and occasions.

Bilston lost its passenger railway station in 1972, although goods trains continued to pass through the site of the station for a further decade. The town's new bus station opened in October 1991, linking with the town's West Midlands Metro station, which opened in May 1999.

The huge British Steel Corporation plant to the west of the town centre was closed in 1979, after 199 years of steel production at the site, with the loss of nearly 2,000 jobs. Part of the site was developed as the Sedgemoor Park Housing Estate between 1986 and 1989, and a B&Q superstore opened on another part of the site in December 1993, forming the first phase of a new small retail park and industrial estate which developed over the next decade. The GKN steel plant to the south of the town centre closed in 1989.

Construction of the long-awaited Black Country Route began in the mid 1980s, although the final phase was not completed until July 1995, by which time Bilston had a direct unbroken dual carriageway link with Dudley, Walsall and the M5 Motorway. The Black Country Spine Road opened at the same time, improving Bilston's road links with West Bromwich and Birmingham.

21st century developments in Bilston include the South Wolverhampton and Bilston Academy and the adjoining Bert Williams Leisure Centre, which form the centerpiece of the town's new Urban Village, which is planned to include an eventual total of more than 1,000 new homes.

== St Leonard's Church ==
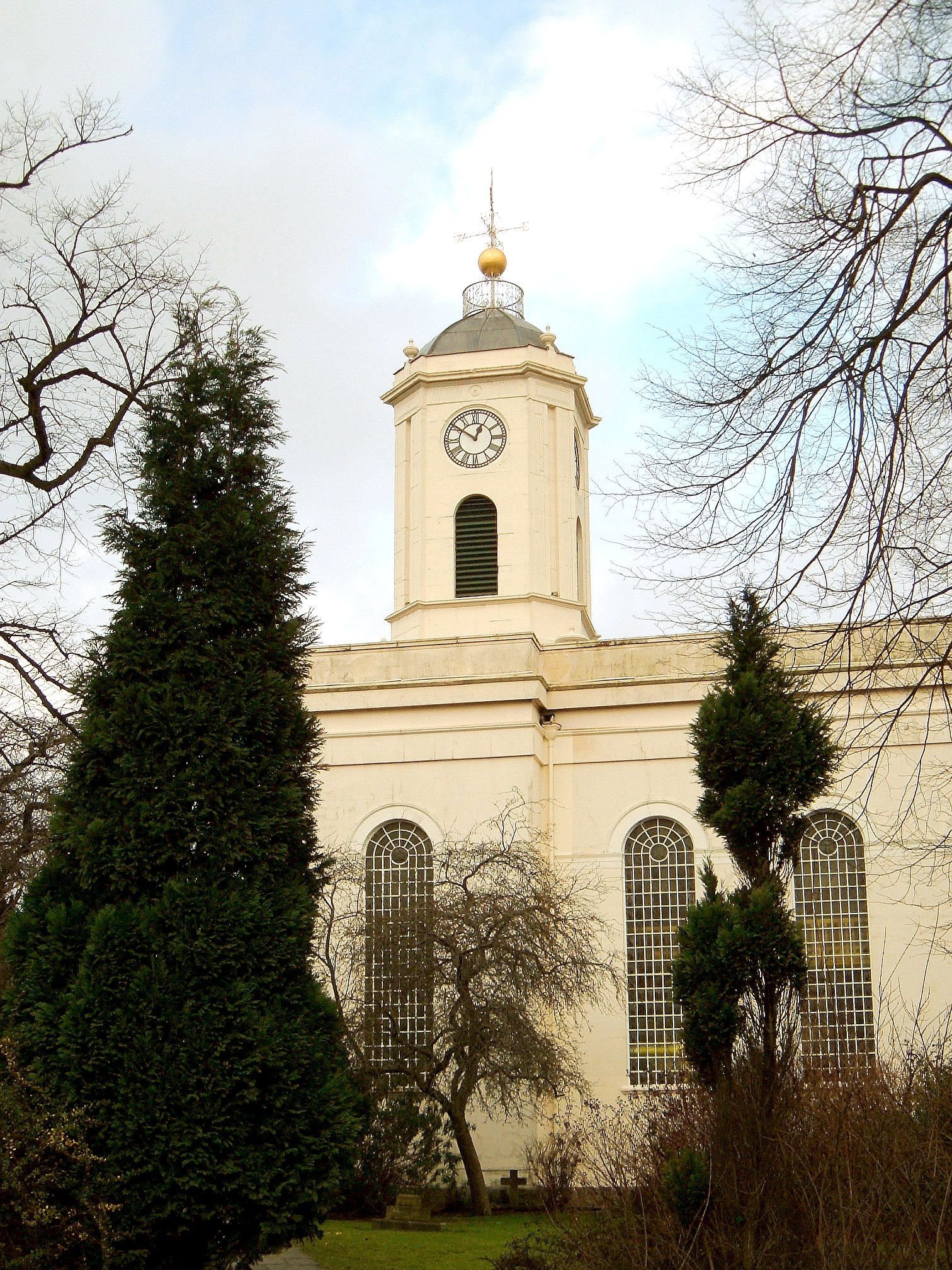
St. Leonard's Church of England church. Bilston

Christian worship in Bilston can be traced back to 1090. In 1458, the chapel was replaced by St Leonard's Chantry and a third renovated church was consecrated in 1733. The church seen today dates from a rebuilding of 1825–26 to the designs of Francis Godwin in the manner of John Soane and is the fourth church on the site, though a small amount of older stonework from the C14 or C15 remains visible inside the present tower. It was altered in 1882–83 by prolific church architect Ewan Christian. Ewan Christian altered the aisle windows into single tall, thin openings where there had previously been two. The church contains a font of 1673, probably from the older church. The church is painted stucco inside and out. It is also unusual in having a chamfered square tower, giving it an octagonal appearance, in being surmounted with a cupola, a golden globe with weather vane and a fenced viewing platform.

== Industry ==
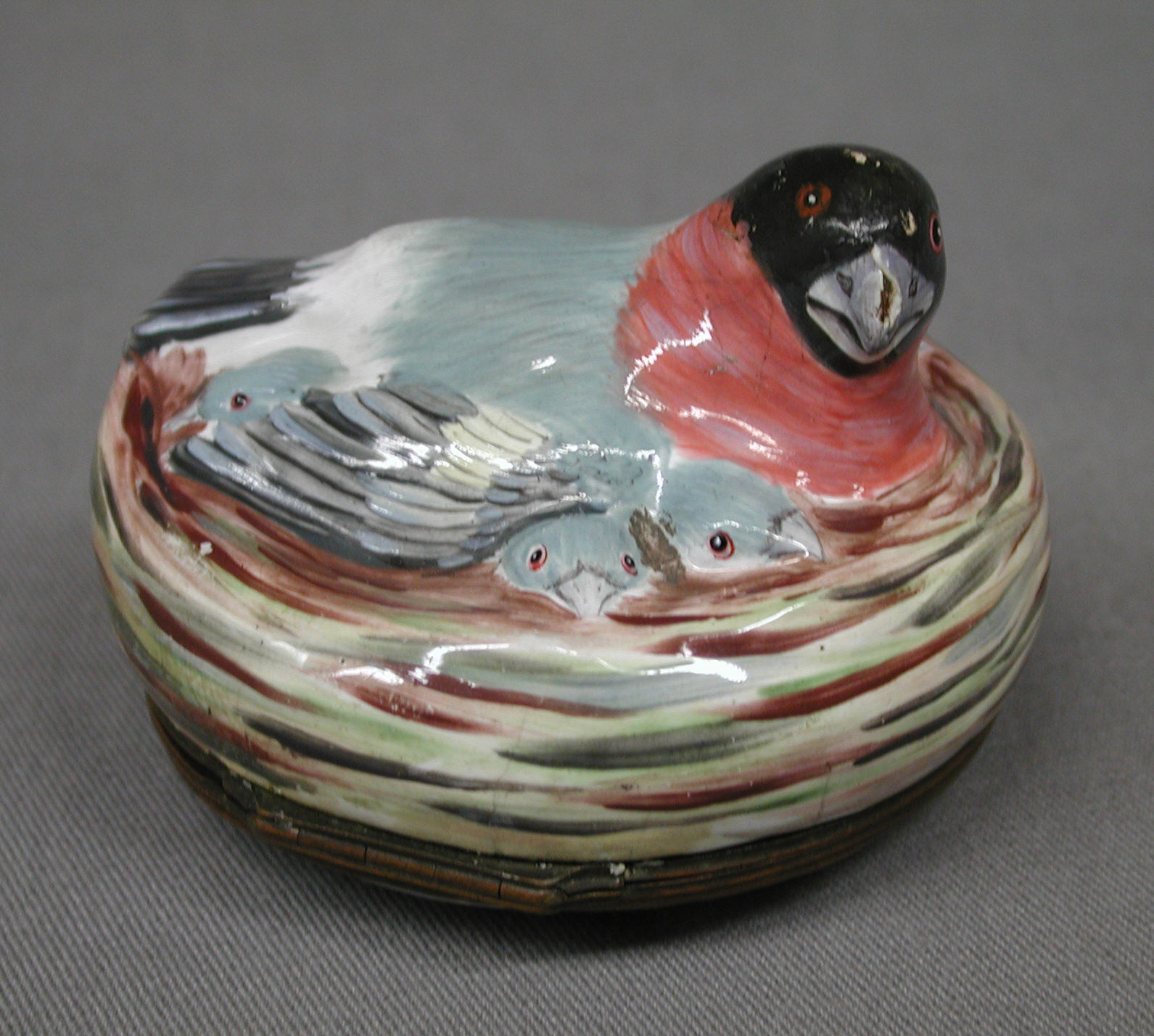
An enamelled bonbonnière from Bilston, now in the collection of the Metropolitan Museum of Art, New York

From the middle of the 18th century, Bilston became well known for the craft of enamelling. Items produced included decorative containers such as patch-boxes, scent boxes, and bonbonnieres.

With the opening of the Birmingham Canal to the west of the town in 1770, industrial activity in the local area increased, with the first blast furnaces near the canal at Spring Vale being erected by 1780.

Bilston was transformed by the Industrial Revolution. In 1800, it was still a largely rural area dependent on farming. By 1900, it was a busy town with numerous factories and coalmines, as well as a large number of houses for the workers and their families. The Bilston coal mines were reputedly haunted by an evil spirit, so the miners brought in a local exorcist known as The White Rabbit.

Six new blast furnaces were erected there between 1866 and 1883. Five of these were producing a total of nearly 25,000 tons of steel per year at what was now known as Bilston Steel Works. The first electric powered blast furnaces opened there in 1907, and finally in 1954 the "Elisabeth" blast furnace was erected, creating 275,000 tons of steel per year. However, by the 1970s the steel works had become uneconomic and the Labour government decided to close it, with closure taking place on 12 April 1979. The iconic "Elisabeth" was demolished on 5 October 1980. Local unemployment, which had been steadily rising for some years, was pushed even higher by the plant's closure. A former railway bridge which connected parts of the steelworks site remains in situ across the canal.

The industry remained prolific during the interwar years, but much of the housing was now sub-standard, and during the 1920s and 1930s, many of the older houses were cleared and replaced by modern council houses.

== Notable people ==
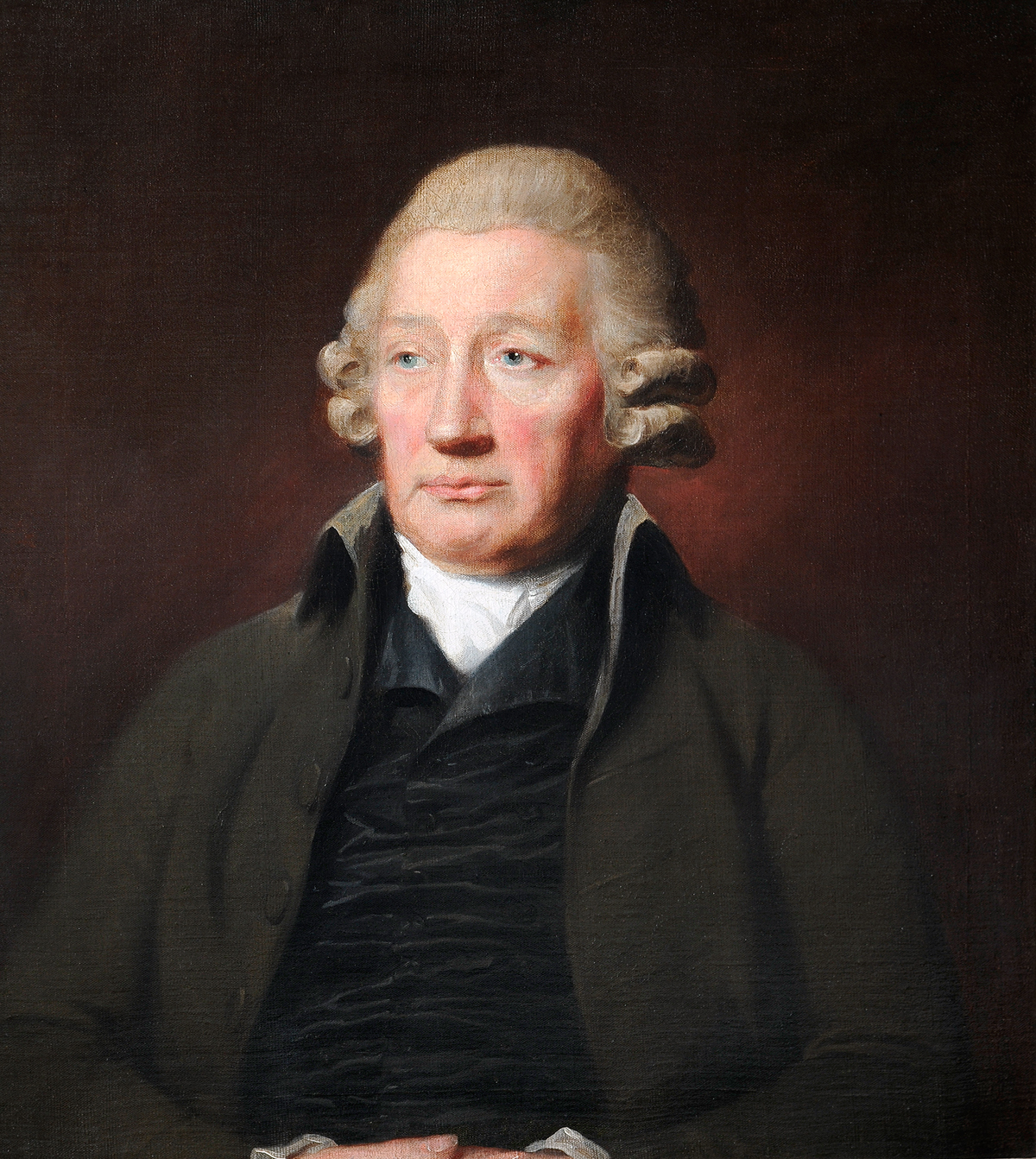
John Wilkinson

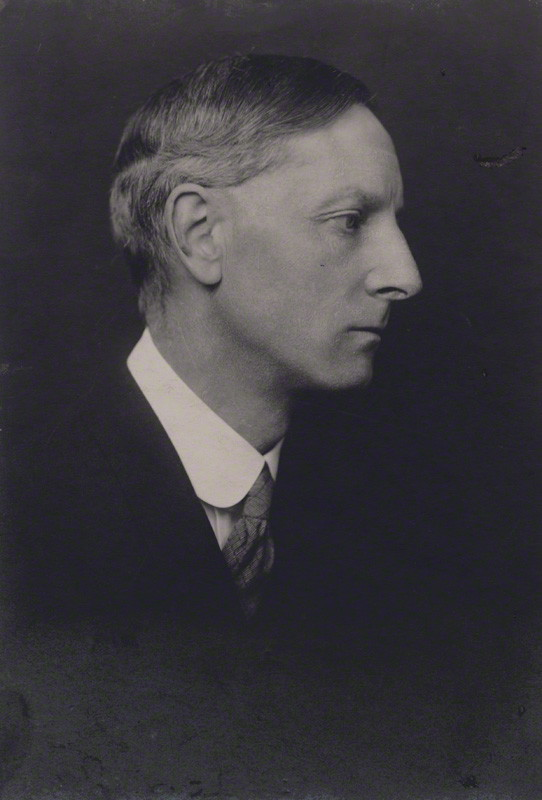
Henry Newbolt, (1900s-1910s)

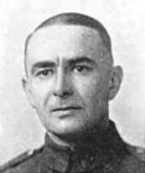
George Onions VC, 1924

- John "Iron-Mad" Wilkinson (1728-1808 in Bradley), industrialist, built a blast furnace in Bilston in 1748.
- Richard Salter (?), inventor, began making the first spring scales in Bilston in the late 1760s.
- John Croft (1800-1865), architect, prominent for being a "Rogue Architect of the Victorian Era".
- George T. Morgan (1845-1925), Chief Engraver of the United States Mint, designed the Morgan silver dollar.
- T. E. Hickman (1859-1930), Army Brigadier-General and MP for Bilston, 1918/1922
- Sir Henry Newbolt (1862-1938), poet, novelist and historian.
- Sir Francis Newbolt (1863-1940), barrister, judge and artist.
- Charles Kidson (1867-1908), artist, leading figure in New Zealand's Arts and Crafts movement in Canterbury.
- Titus Lowe (1877-1959), bishop, served for the Methodist Episcopal Church.
- George Page (1878-1972), Mayor of Nelson, New Zealand, 1935 to 1941.
- Geoffrey Peto (1878-1956), MP for the constituency of Bilston, 1931/1935
- Edward Kidson (1882-1939), meteorologist, enhanced weather forecasting in New Zealand.
- Captain George Onions (1883-1944), British soldier, awarded the Victoria Cross in August 1918.
- Tom Webster (1886–1962), cartoonist and caricaturist.
- William Harold Dudley (1890-1949), painter, known for his landscapes.
- Hugh Walters (1910 in Bradley – 1993), science fiction writer, lived the majority of his life in Bilston.
- Frank Bealey (1922-2013), political scientist, pioneer in the academic study of politics.
- Sir Bruce Forsyth (1928-2017), entertainer, made his first public stage appearance, billed as "Boy Bruce, the Mighty Atom", aged 14 at the Theatre Royal in 1942.
- David Daker (born 1935), actor, best-known role on TV was Harry Crawford in Boon
- Dennis Turner (1942-2014), local MP, 1987 to 2005, life peer, granted the title Baron Bilston
- Michael Lyons (1943-2019), sculptor, prominent works on display at the Yorkshire Sculpture Park.
- Steve Woolam (1946–1971), violinist, one of the founding members of the Electric Light Orchestra.
- Don Powell (born 1946), drummer in the band Slade.
- James Fleet (born 1952), actor, played Tom in the romantic comedy film Four Weddings and a Funeral.
- Jane Owen (born 1963), politician and diplomat, the current Governor of the Cayman Islands
- Sonita Gale (born 1975), documentary filmmaker, made the film Hostile which showcased the Home Office hostile environment policy.

=== Sport ===
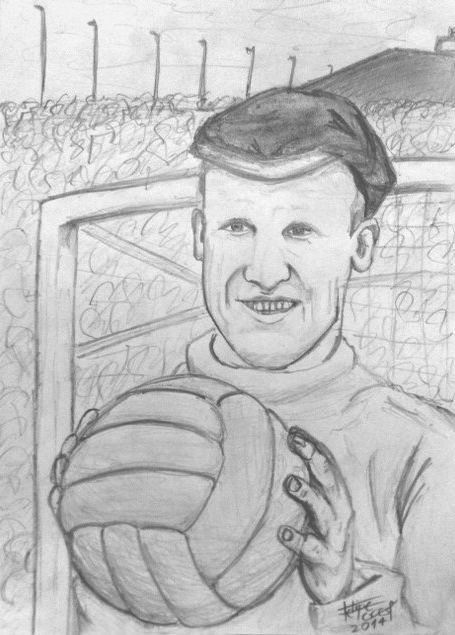
Bert Williams, 2014

- Jack Holden (1907–2004), a long-distance runner
- Edith Atkins (1920 – 1999), racing cyclist and a prolific breaker of long-distance records
- Reg Lewis (1920-1997), footballer, who scored both goals for Arsenal in their 2–0 victory over Liverpool in the 1950 FA Cup final.
- Bert Williams (1920 in Bradley- 2014), football goalkeeper, played 406 games including 381 with Wolves and 24 with England. He has a leisure centre named after him, near Morrisons.
- Bill Shorthouse (1922 – 2008), football player and coach, who played 344 games for Wolves.
- Dennis Gordon (1924 – 1998), footballer who played 277 games for Brighton
- George Showell (1934 – 2012) footballer who played 200 games for Wolves.
- Maureen Tranter (born 1947), retired sprinter, competed at the 1968 Summer Olympics
- Ron Pountney (born 1955) former footballer who played 347 games for Southend United F.C.
- Mark Grew (born 1958), football goalkeeper, played 277 games including 184 for Port Vale

== Transport ==
=== Canal ===
The original line of the Birmingham Canal (now the BCN Old Main Line) was planned to serve Bilston amongst other towns. The bill for its construction stated that "the Primary and Principal Object of this Undertaking was and is to obtain a Navigation from the Collieries to this Town [ie Birmingham]". The canal opened from Wednesbury to Birmingham on 6 November 1769 and through to Newell on 25 March 1772. Coal from Bilston was reaching Birmingham by May 1770. When the BCN New Main Line was built the Wednesbury section became a loop serving industry and collieries, the southern part of which was subsequently abandoned and filled in. A branch was also built from the Walsall Canal to Bilston, but was closed in 1953.

=== Railway ===
From 1850 to 1972 there was a railway station in Bilston town centre, but passenger services were then withdrawn and the line via Bilston (from Wolverhampton Low Level to Birmingham Snow Hill) had been almost completely abandoned within a decade. There was also a railway station, Bilston West on the now closed Oxford-Worcester-Wolverhampton Line. The final stub of the railway, connecting a town centre scrapyard with the South Staffordshire Line at Wednesbury, closed in 1992.

=== Tram ===
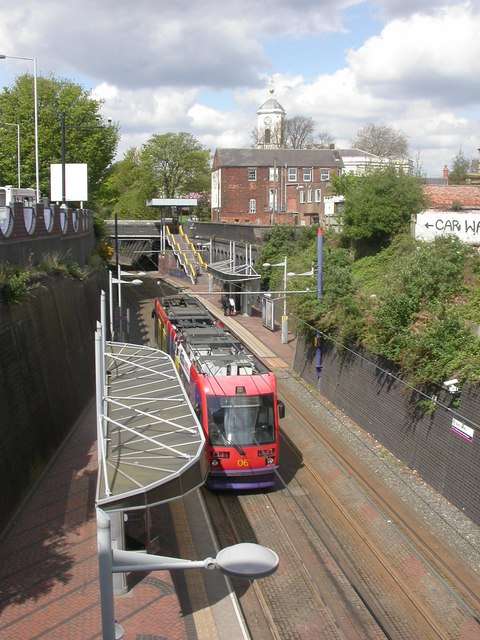
Bilston Central Metro stop

Bilston has three West Midlands Metro tram stops on the line between Wolverhampton and Birmingham; Bilston Central, Loxdale and The Crescent.

=== Road ===
A significant development in the Bilston area was the A463 Black Country Route. With more cars, the roads around Bilston town centre became increasingly congested. In the late 1960s, the government drew up plans for a new motorway bypassing Bilston (and running from the A4123 near Coseley to Junction 10 of the M6 motorway at Walsall), which was scheduled to be completed by 1976, but nothing came of it. Plans for a new dual carriageway were revived in the early 1980s on a slightly different route, much closer to Bilston town centre. The first phase of the road (to be known as the Black County Route) was completed in 1986. Though initially running around one-half mile (800 metres) east of the A4123, it was extended in 1990 to Oxford Street in Bilston town centre. In the town centre a number of buildings were demolished and roads re-routed, while one road, Market Street was obliterated. During 1995, completion of the final phase of the Black Country Route between Bilston and Junction 10 of the M6 motorway led to an improvement in traffic flow in and around the town centre.

=== Bus ===
Bilston Bus Station opened in 1991 and underwent refurbishment in 2005 by Centro. Buses run from the bus station to Wolverhampton, Willenhall, Wednesfield, New Cross Hospital, Tipton, Dudley and Walsall. In addition, surrounding areas such as Ettingshall, The Lunt, Stowlawn, Rocket Pool, Bradley, Moxley and Portobello are served. Service 79 (Wolverhampton - West Bromwich) does not stop at the bus station, instead its route is along Wellington Road and Lichfield Street.

Services 34, 39, 42, 79, 82 and 530 (Sunday) are operated by West Midlands Bus. The 25 service is operated by Chaserider. Services 26A, 82 (Evening/Sunday), 223, 229, 303 and 326 are operated by Diamond West Midlands. Services 53 and 530 (Mon-Sat) are operated by Banga Bus and service 23/23A and 224 are operated by Carolean Coaches. Some services are subsidised by Transport for West Midlands.

== Arts and culture ==
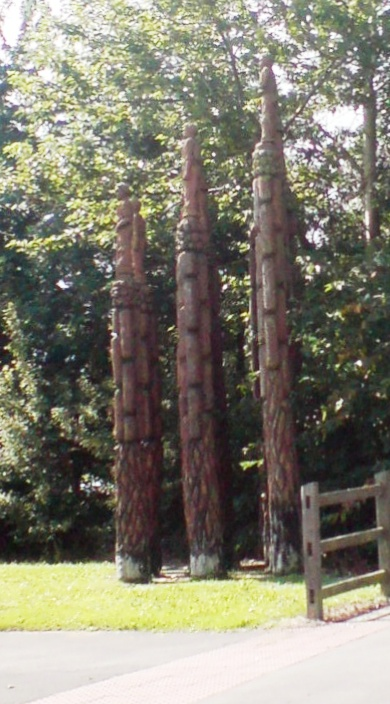
Steel columns at Bilston by Robert Koenig. viewed from the side, August 2008

At the Bilston end of the Black Country Route can be seen the group of wooden statues designed by Robert Koenig and called "Steel Columns." "This sculpture was made from 15 lengths of sweet chestnut which stretch up to 6 metres in height. The male and female figures depicted are based on those found in old Victorian photographs of Bilston. The title Steel Columns is a reference to Bilston's steel making background and the connection the figures had with this history."

Art and craft works of local significance from the eighteenth century are displayed at Bilston Craft Gallery, which also has a temporary exhibition space where local art and crafts are often displayed. The craft gallery also hosts workshops for families and children, including school trips.

The artist William Harold Dudley was born in Bilston; several of his works are in the collection of Wolverhampton Art Gallery.

Bilston Carnival in the 1960s travelled along Wellington Road before ending in Hickman Park where there would be Pat Collins' fun fair, horse jumping and an open air stage hosting various entertainment including wrestling and live music bands. The park also had one of the tallest slides for children in any park.

== Media ==
Local news and television programmes are provided by BBC West Midlands and ITV Central. Television signals are received from the Sutton Coldfield TV transmitter.

Local radio stations are BBC Radio WM, Heart West Midlands, Smooth West Midlands, Hits Radio Black Country & Shropshire, Greatest Hits Radio Birmingham & The West Midlands, Greatest Hits Radio Black Country & Shropshire and WCR FM, a community based station which broadcast from nearby Wolverhampton.

The town is served by the local newspaper, Express & Star.

== Education ==
Bilston has 15 primary schools, and two secondary schools – South Wolverhampton and Bilston Academy and Moseley Park School, which was originally Etheridge Secondary Modern (formerly Fraser Street Schools), and Bilston Boys' Grammar School. Manor Primary School, which used to be a secondary school, is sometimes incorrectly believed to be in Bilston, but is actually in Woodcross which is within the Wolverhampton-governed part of Coseley.

Bilston had a Cholera Orphan School which was opened on 3 August 1833 following a severe outbreak during the second cholera pandemic (1829–51) which had left 450 orphans in Bilston after the death of 742 sufferers. The Royal School, Wolverhampton has similar origins.

== Crime ==
In 1862 the case of David Brandrick, the "Bilston Murderer" was heavily covered by all the local papers. According to the Windsor and Eton Journal, Saturday 11 January 1862, Brandrick was hanged outside Stafford Jail that morning for the murder of John Bagott, a clothier and pawnbroker.

On 30 September 2007, the body of 16-year-old Shane Owoo was recovered from a flooded clay pit near the Lunt estate. Two Wolverhampton men, Christopher Lewis and Marvin Walker, were found guilty of manslaughter on 25 April 2008 and sentenced to five and a half years in prison. The jury at Birmingham Crown Court heard that the pair had frogmarched Owoo to the pool amid allegations that he had stolen a bicycle from one of the defendants. A third man, Tobias Davies, received a 12-month prison sentence for assaulting Owoo, but had not been present when the other two men attacked him and chased him into the pool where he drowned.

On 28 July 2009, 47-year-old Moxley pub landlord Swinder Singh Batth was shot dead in the town centre outside Gavin's Sports Bar. Jasbir Singh Takhar, of Coseley, and Sukwinder Singh Sanghera, of West Bromwich, were jailed for life a year later for the murder; it was established that they had been attempting to shoot someone else. The trial judge recommended minimum terms of 29 and 28 years respectively. Five other people received prison sentences of between 21 months and three years for conspiracy to commit violent disorder in connection with the crime, while a sixth person received a three-and-half-year prison sentence for witness intimidation.

On 21 November 2009, 50-year-old Dudley man Daniel McCalla was shot dead at the town's Tropical Harmony nightclub.

== Demography ==
At the 2021 census, Bilston's built-up area population was recorded as having a population of 34,639. Of the findings, the ethnicity and religious composition of the wards separately were:

Bilston: Ethnicity: 2021 Census
Ethnic group	Population	%
White	22,792	65.8%
Asian or Asian British	6,145	17.7%
Black or Black British	2,962	8.6%
Mixed	1,936	5.6%
Other Ethnic Group	730	2.1%
Arab	61	0.3%
Total	34,639	100%

The religious composition of the built-up area at the 2021 Census was recorded as:

Bilston: Religion: 2021 Census
Religious	Population	%
Christian	15,112	46.1%
No religion	11,415	34.8%
Sikh	3,384	10.3%
Hindu	1,407	4.3%
Muslim	834	2.5%
Other religion	470	1.4%
Buddhist	132	0.3%
Jewish	15	0.1%
Total	34,639	100%

== Governance ==
Four wards of Wolverhampton City Council now cover the town. These are Bilston South and Bilston North, which almost entirely comprise parts of the historic Borough of Bilston and Ettingshall North and Ettingshall South and Spring Vale, which comprise a part of Bilston and other parts of Wolverhampton.

The town was represented by Bilston parliamentary constituency from 1918 until 1974, which also included nearby Sedgley and Coseley. Bilston was then incorporated into Wolverhampton South East, where it remains.
