= Edward Kidson =

New Zealand meteorologist and administrator (1882–1939)

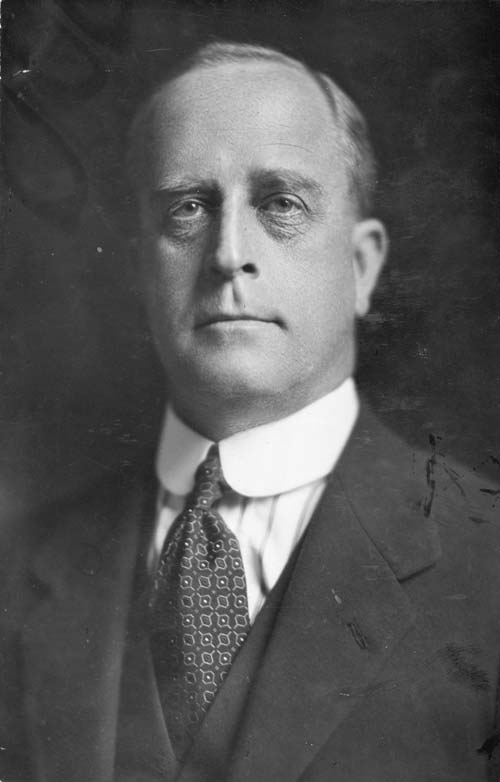
Edward Kidson circa 1927 (Photographer: Stanley P. Andrew)

Edward Kidson OBE (12 March 1882 – 12 June 1939) was a New Zealand meteorologist and scientific administrator.

== Early life and education ==
Kidson was born in Bilston, Staffordshire, England, on 12 March 1882. his family moved to Nelson, New Zealand when he was aged three.

Kidson was educated at Nelson College from 1896 to 1900, and at Canterbury College, from where he graduated MSc with first-class honours in electricity and magnetism in 1905, and MA in 1906.

== Military service ==
Kidson served in the meteorological section of the Royal Engineers from 1915 to 1919. He studied the application of wind and temperature measurements to gunnery as well as developing a forecasting service for artillery for the expeditionary force in Salonika. This proved successful and saw Kidson promoted to the rank of captain in 1917 and as well as being mentioned in dispatches. In the 1919 New Year Honours, Kidson was appointed an Officer of the Military Division of the Order of the British Empire, for services rendered in connection with military operations in Thessaloniki, Greece, during the First World War. During his time in London he met and married Isabel Maria Dann.

== Meteorological research ==
After the war he worked at the Meteorological Office in London prior to taking up a position at the Carnegie Institution managing a new observatory at Watheroo, north of Perth in Western Australia. He joined the Commonwealth Bureau of Meteorology in Melbourne, Australia in 1921 and only two years later was made responsible for its Research Division. In 1924 he was elected a fellow of the Institute of Physics and was awarded a DSc from the University of New Zealand for his research on cloud heights. In 1927 Kidson was appointed Dominion Meteorologist by Earnest Marsden. At the time the New Zealand Meteorological Service was a very small institution with a staff of five and a complete lack of useful long-period meteorological records.

Kidson recognised the value of accurate forecasting for farming, shipping and aviation. One of his early studies was an analysis of meteorological conditions during the first flight across the Tasman Sea piloted by Sir Charles Kingsford Smith. In 1937 he convened a conference to plan for enhanced aviation meteorology for the south-west Pacific. By 1939, specialised aviation forecasting had become a routine part of the Meteorological Service's activities.

Later in his career he made a number of visits to Norway, at the time the centre of advanced meteorological research. Whilst there, he was exposed to the latest developments in analysis of weather data which he brought back to New Zealand. This scientific connection was further enhanced through a personal correspondence he maintained with Jacob Bjerknes during the 1930s and was furthered with a visit to New Zealand by meteorologist Jørgen Holmboe, in 1934. Holmboe was en route to join the Lincoln Ellsworth Antarctic Expedition (which included the Australian explorer Sir Hubert Wilkins). This enabled a collaboration that resulted in a number of papers and a rapid enhancement in weather forecasting in New Zealand.

== The Edward & Isabel Kidson Scholarship ==
Kidson died suddenly of a heart attack on 12 June 1939, aged 57. Kidson's widow, Isabel, lived another twenty years. In her will she left sufficient funds for a scholarship - The Edward & Isabel Kidson Scholarships - to enable New Zealand university graduates who have shown ability in physics or a combination of physics and mathematics to undertake postgraduate study in meteorology or some other branch of science, either in New Zealand or overseas.
