= Bilston Craft Gallery =

Coordinates: 52.5682°N 2.0717°W

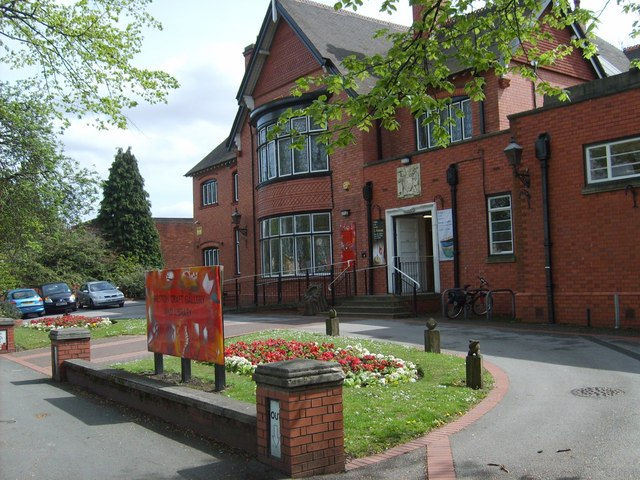
- Facade of Bilston craft Gallery.
- Established: 1937
- Location: Mount Pleasant, Bilston, West Midlands
- Type: Arts and Crafts
- Website: www.wolverhamptonart.org.uk/visit/bilston/

Bilston Craft Gallery is the largest dedicated craft venue in the West Midlands, located at Mount Pleasant, Bilston, near Bilston town centre.

== Building ==
The two-storey stone residential house was built in 1905 as a home for the Harper family, the local lock manufacturers. It replaced a much older Regency building, Brueton House, built in 1818 by Thomas Brueton.

Between 1918–30 the house was used by Bilston Girls High School. After the school had moved to a larger building and grounds, the house was re-modelled and a large extension at the rear of the building was added. From 1937-1990s, the building housed the Bilston Art Gallery and Museum. The building also houses Bilston Library.

== History ==
Bilston Art Gallery and Museum was officially opened in 1937 by Professor Thomas Bodkin, the founding Director of the Barber Institute of Fine Arts, Birmingham. The core of the collection was formed from about hundred paintings which were donated in 1937 to the gallery by William Thompson, formerly of Bilston, but then a resident of Colwyn Bay, Wales. In following decades, the Gallery regularly organised exhibitions of artworks by local artists, received various gifts and donations, and built a substantial collection of local art and artefacts related to local history.

In 1990s, in the process of re-structure of cultural services across the area, the collection was transferred to Wolverhampton Art Gallery, and Bilston Museum was re-styled as Bilston Craft Gallery. At present, it shares the building with the Bilston Library. Bilston Craft Gallery is a part of Wolverhampton Arts and Museums Service.

== Exhibitions ==
=== Permanent display ===
Bilston Craft Gallery has a permanent exhibition 'Craftsense' which showcases objects from eighteenth-century local industry alongside commissioned contemporary pieces that use similar techniques. Almost a hundred Bilston enamels form the main part of the display, but as part of the collection re-shuffle in the 1990s, the Bilston enamels, among other industrial and historical items, were removed to Bantock House, causing public outcry, but were returned in 2005 with the opening of the Craftsense gallery. Together with those remaining on show at Bantock form the largest collection of enamels apart from that of the Victoria and Albert Museum.

=== Temporary exhibitions and education ===
Bilston Craft Gallery has a programme of temporary exhibitions featuring modern craft works. It offers a range of learning opportunities for all ages including the access to the Crafts Council Photostore, featuring over a thousand selected designer-makers. The creative gallery 'Craftplay' was specially designed for pre-school children.

The 'First Floor Gallery' is a hireable community space for individuals and groups to show their own exhibitions of craft and art.

=== Garden ===
The gallery backs onto a large garden populated with various flowers. It contains several craft works, including two carved wooden dragons by Graham Jones and a circle of stone sculptures.
