= Hostile (2021 film) =

2021 British political documentary

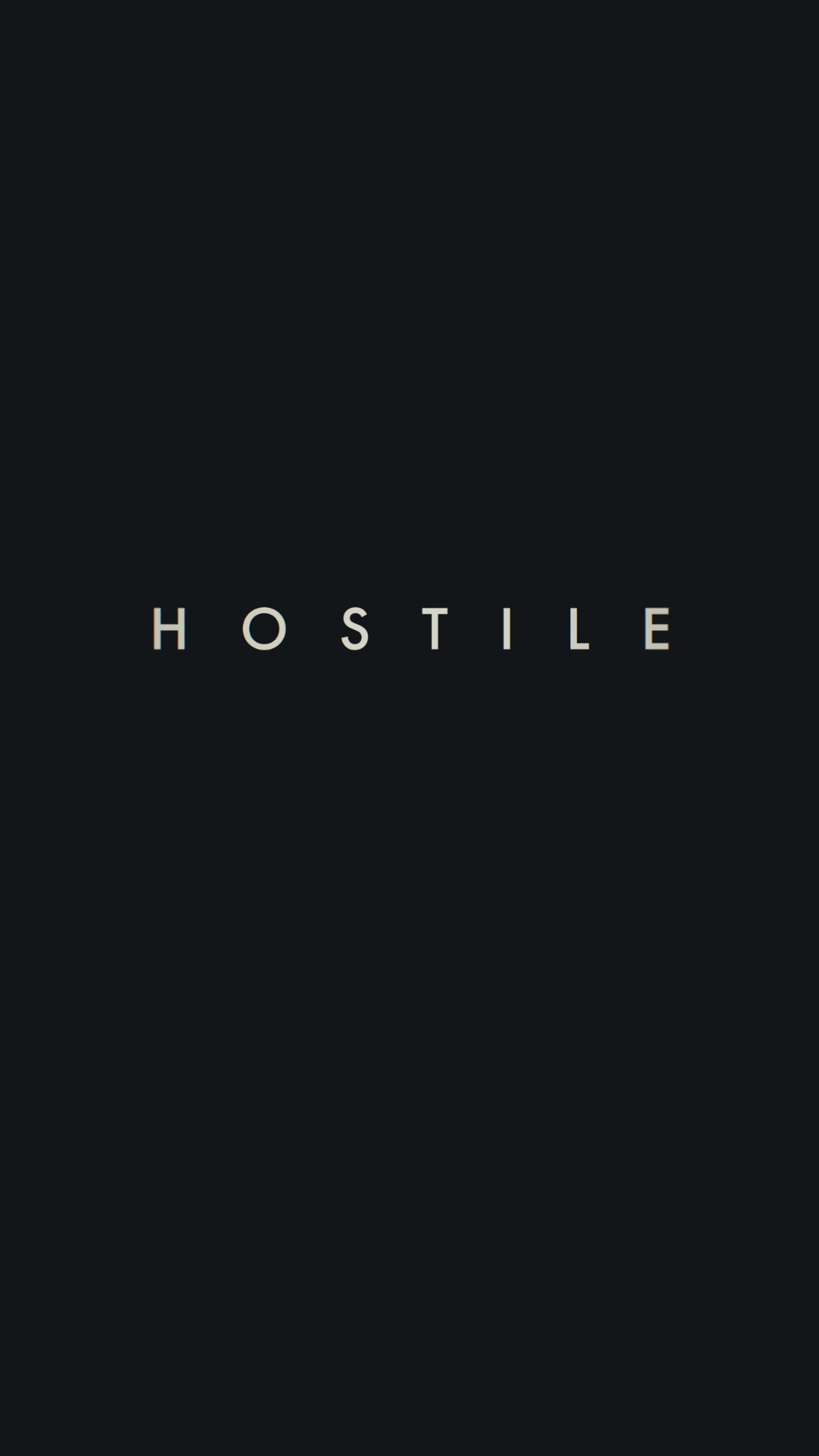
- Theatrical release poster
- Directed by: Sonita Gale
- Produced by: Sonita Gale; Nitin Sawhney; Charlotte Fisher
- Starring: Farrukh Sair; Daksha Varsani; Paresh Jethwa
- Cinematography: Neil Harvey
- Edited by: Alex Fry
- Music by: Nitin Sawhney
- Distributed by: British Film Institute; SBS; Rialto Distribution; PMGSC; VGTV
- Release dates: 29 October 2021 (Raindance); 21 January 2022 (UK)
- Running time: 97 minutes
- Country: United Kingdom
- Language: English

Hostile is a 2021 documentary film directed by Sonita Gale. The film explores the UK government's 'hostile environment' immigration policy, first articulated in 2012 under David Cameron's administration. The film premiered on 29 October 2021 at the Raindance Film Festival.

== Synopsis ==
The film delves into the UK government's 'hostile environment' policy. Told through the stories of four participants from Black and Asian backgrounds, the film explores how the lives of international students, members of the Windrush generation and so-called 'Highly-Skilled Migrants' have been affected.

The 'hostile environment' policy strategy was first employed by Theresa May in 2012, while she was Home Secretary in David Cameron's government. Speaking at the time, May stated that "The aim is to create, here in Britain, a really hostile environment for illegal immigrants."

The film shows Farrukh Sair, an NHS IT engineer whose repeated visa applications have left him heavily in debt, and Anthony Bryan, a member of the Windrush generation, who was denied his rights to live and work in the UK despite having lived in the country since he was 8. Daksha and Paresh, who started a Community Response Kitchen to feed members of the migrant community struggling to buy food. International students and a teacher also share their experiences anonymously.

A key focus of the film is NRPF, or 'no recourse to public funds'. Under section 115 of the Immigration and Asylum Act 1999, a person who is subject to immigration control cannot claim public funds such as benefits or housing assistance. Hostile profiled the impact of this policy, and the particular problems that arose following the outbreak of the coronavirus pandemic when many in the migrant community found themselves unable to work but were not eligible for Universal Credit, Disability Living Allowance, Child Benefit and Housing Benefit, among other things.

The director has said that the main aim of the film was "to build… bridges and to start dialogue… about our similarities and our differences."

Gale has also discussed her upbringing and how this influenced the making of Hostile. As one of ten children born to a couple who left India for Wolverhampton following Partition, she strove to put migration and social change at the centre of her storytelling.

== Production ==
The film was written, directed and produced by London-based filmmaker Sonita Gale. Filming commenced shortly after the outbreak of the COVID-19 pandemic. Gale has stated that she originally intended the film to look at the treatment of migrant workers, but that once she started filming, she shifted her focus to the 'hostile environment' policy more broadly.

Nitin Sawhney and Charlotte Fisher were the film's executive producers, with Sawhney also providing music for the film.

== Release ==
The film first premiered at Raindance Film Festival on 29 October 2021.

Distribution rights were acquired by BFI Player, VGTV, SBS, Public Media Group of Southern California, and Rialto. The film is currently available to stream on BFI Player.

The film was released to the general public on 21 January 21, 2022, screening at Picturehouse Cinemas and other independent cinemas across the UK, including BFI Southbank, Bertha Doc House and Curzon.

Hostile director Sonita Gale has also participated in many Q&As at screenings, with figures including Nitin Sawhney, film critic Jason Solomons, John Sauven, campaigner Patrick Vernon, Ursula Macfarlane (director of Untouchable), UK Director of Human Rights Watch Yasmine Ahmed, Refugee Council CEO Enver Solomon, MP Stephen Timms, Bella Sankey, Maya Goodfellow, Sonali Naik, Zoe Gardner and activist Andrew Feinstein.

She has also been interviewed by MP David Lammy for LBC.

== Reception ==
=== Critical response ===
The film was praised by critics. The Guardian's Peter Bradshaw awarded Hostile 4 out of 5 stars, calling it a "powerful film" and "highly pertinent".

Time Out's Whelan Barzey described it as "a cry from the heart for a more compassionate attitude towards immigrants."

Amelia Gentleman, a Guardian journalist who has reported extensively on the Windrush scandal, wrote that "Gale's portrayal of Sair's predicament is so clear and powerful that the pointless human damage wrought by these complexities is laid bare."

The New European's Jason Solomons wrote "what's interesting about Hostile is its desire to dig deeper. Not content with highlighting the obvious indignities and cruelties of how the policy operates and how it leaves victims in desperate circumstances, but into why it is there in the first place."

Mariella Frostrup of Times Radio called it "a film that demands our attention" and Abiba Coulibaly of Sight and Sound praised it as "one of the most comprehensive accounts of how we arrived at our current immigration system legislation."

Journalist and former Channel 4 News presenter Jon Snow tweeted his approval of the film, calling it "important and revealing."

Mark Kermode named it his BFI Player Choice of the Week, describing Hostile as “more than just a film. It’s a multimedia collage that calls for action, engaging the viewer, and encouraging them to change the world for the better.”.

=== Accolades ===
Award nominations for Work
Year	Category	Institution or publication	Result	Notes	Ref.
2022	Outstanding Debut By A British Writer, Director or Producer	BAFTA	Longlisted		
2021	Best Debut Director	BIFA	Longlisted		
2021	Best Documentary	BIFA	Longlisted		
2021	Raindance Discovery Award	BIFA	Longlisted		
2022	Best Documentary Feature	Filmocracy Fest 2022	Won		
2022	Best Documentary Feature	The Roxbury International Film Festival 2022	Won		
2021	Best Documentary Feature	South London Film Festival 2021	Won		
2022	Award of Excellence Special Mention	The Impact DOCS Awards 2022	Won		
2022	Best Indie Feature Film Honourable Mention	The Best Indie Film Awards 2022	Won		
2022	Supreme Award	Melbourne Documentary Film Festival 2022	Nominated	Finalist	
2022	Best Director - International	Melbourne Documentary Film Festival 2022	Nominated	Finalist	
2022	Finalist - Official Selection	Catalina Film Festival 2022	Nominated	Finalist	
2022	Best Documentary	British Urban Film Festival 2022	Nominated	Finalist	
2023	Official Selection	Windrush Caribbean Film Festival			
2022	Official Selection	Take One Action Film Festival			
2022	Official Selection	Naples Human Rights Film Festival 2022			
2022	Official Selection	Red Carpet Human Rights Film Festival 2022			
2022	Official Selection	DOCtober 2022			
2022	Official Selection	Festival des Libertés 2022			
2022	Official Selection	New Generations Independent Indian Film Festival 2022			
2022	Official Selection	UK Asian Film Festival 2022			
2022	Official Selection	Budapest Movie Awards 2022			
2022	Official Selection	Manchester Film Awards 2022			
2022	Official Selection	ZagrebDox 2022			
2022	Official Selection	NorthwestFest International Documentary Film Festival 2022			
2022	Official Selection	Berlin Lift-Off Film Festival 2022			
2021	Official Selection	Cambridge Film Festival 2021			
2021	Official Selection	London Migration Film Festival 2021			
2021	Official Selection	Raindance Film Festival 2021			
2021	Official Selection	Global Health Film Festival 2022			
