= 1965–66 Aston Villa F.C. season =

English football club season

Aston Villa
1965–66 season
- Chairman: Norman Smith
- Manager: Dick Taylor
- Stadium: Villa Park
- First Division: 16th
- FA Cup: Third round
- League Cup: Fifth round

The 1965–66 English football season was Aston Villa's 67th season in the Football League, this season playing in the Football League First Division. Villa finished 16th, below Arsenal and Newcastle United and just above Sheffield Wednesday and Nottingham Forest.

There were debuts for Willie Hamilton (49) and Tony Scott (50).

== Football League First Division ==
| Pos | Team | Pld | W | D | L | GF | GA | GAv | Pts |
|---|---|---|---|---|---|---|---|---|---|
| 14 | Arsenal | 42 | 12 | 13 | 17 | 62 | 75 | 0.827 | 37 |
| 15 | Newcastle United | 42 | 14 | 9 | 19 | 50 | 63 | 0.794 | 37 |
| 16 | Aston Villa | 42 | 15 | 6 | 21 | 69 | 80 | 0.863 | 36 |
| 17 | Sheffield Wednesday | 42 | 14 | 8 | 20 | 56 | 66 | 0.848 | 36 |
| 18 | Nottingham Forest | 42 | 14 | 8 | 20 | 56 | 72 | 0.778 | 36 |

Source: World Football
Rules for classification: 1) Points; 2) Goal average; 3) Goals scored

=== Results ===
| 21 August 1965 | Sheffield United | 1–0 | Aston Villa |
| | | Report |
Note:

| 23 August 1965 | Aston Villa | 0–2 | Leeds United | Villa Park |
| | | Report |

| 28 August 1965 | Aston Villa | 2–2 | Leicester City | Villa Park |
| | (Hateley), 59' (Aitken), 75' | Report |

| 1 September 1965 | Leeds United | 2–0 | Aston Villa |
| | | Report |

| 4 September 1965 | Blackburn Rovers | 0–2 | Aston Villa |
| | | Report | (Hateley), 11' (Hateley), 17' |
Note: Villa, bottom of the table with a single point, pick up their first win.

| 6 September 1965 | Aston Villa | 3–1 | Sunderland | Villa Park |
| | (Hamilton) (Park) (Hateley) | Report |

| 11 September 1965 | Aston Villa | 3–0 | Blackpool | Villa Park |
| | (Hamilton) (Woosnam) (Park) | Report |

| 15 September 1965 | Sunderland | 2–0 | Aston Villa |
| | | Report |

| 18 September 1965 | Fulham | 3–6 | Aston Villa |
| | | Report | (Hateley), 2' (Hateley), 65' (Woosnam) (Tindall) (MacLeod) (Hamilton) |

| 25 September 1965 | Aston Villa | 3–2 | Tottenham Hotspur | Villa Park |
| | (Park) (Woosnam) (Hamilton) |

| 2 October 1965 | Liverpool | 3–1 | Aston Villa |
| | | | (Woosnam), 87' |

| 9 October 1965 | Newcastle United | 1–0 | Aston Villa |

| 16 October 1965 | Aston Villa | 1–1 | West Bromwich Albion | Villa Park |
| | (Pountney), 67' |

| 23 October 1965 | Nottingham Forest | 1–2 | Aston Villa |
| | | | (Woosnam) (Hateley) |

| 30 October 1965 | Aston Villa | 2–0 | Sheffield Wednesday | Villa Park |
| | (Scott) (Hateley) |

| 6 November 1965 | Northampton Town | 2–1 | Aston Villa |
| | | | (Park), 59' |

| 13 November 1965 | Aston Villa | 0–1 | Stoke City | Villa Park |

| 20 November 1965 | Burnley | 3–1 | Aston Villa |
| | | | (Hateley), 37' |

| 27 November 1965 | Aston Villa | 2–4 | Chelsea | Villa Park |
| | (Scott) (Pountney) |

| 4 December 1965 | Arsenal | 3–3 | Aston Villa |
| | | | (Hateley) (Parker) (Hamilton) |

| 11 December 1965 | Aston Villa | 3–2 | Everton | Villa Park |
| | (Woosnam) (Hateley) (Hateley) |

| 1 January 1966 | Aston Villa | 4–2 | Newcastle United | Villa Park |
| | (Woosnam) (Woosnam) (MacLeod) (Hamilton) |

| 8 January 1966 | Everton | 2–0 | Aston Villa |

| 15 January 1966 | Aston Villa | 3–0 | Nottingham Forest | Villa Park |
| | (Hamilton) (Woosnam) (Woosnam) |

| 29 January 1966 | Aston Villa | 0–2 | Sheffield United | Villa Park |

| 5 February 1966 | Leicester City | 2–1 | Aston Villa |
| | | | (Hateley), 81' |

| 7 February 1966 | Aston Villa | 1–2 | West Ham United | Villa Park |
| | (Hateley) |

| 11 February 1966 | West Bromwich Albion | 2–2 | Aston Villa |
| | | | (Hateley), 11' (Hateley), 90' |

| 19 February 1966 | Aston Villa | 3–1 | Blackburn Rovers | Villa Park |
| | (Deakin) (Hateley) (MacLeod) |

| 26 February 1966 | Blackpool | 0–1 | Aston Villa |
| | | | (Hamilton), 75' |

| 5 March 1966 | West Ham United | 4–2 | Aston Villa |
| | | | (MacLeod) (Hateley) |

| 12 March 1966 | Aston Villa | 2–5 | Fulham | Villa Park |
| | (Hateley) (Deakin) |

| 19 March 1966 | Tottenham Hotspur | 5–5 | Aston Villa |
| | | | (Hateley) (Hateley) (Hateley) (Hateley) (Hateley) (Deakin) |
Note: Tony Hateley scores four second-half goals as Villa came from 5–1 down to draw 5–5 with Tottenham Hotspur.

| 26 March 1966 | Aston Villa | 0–3 | Liverpool | Villa Park |

| 2 April 1966 | Aston Villa | 1–2 | Northampton Town | Villa Park |
| | (Hamilton), 13' |

| 6 April 1966 | Aston Villa | 1–1 | Manchester United | Villa Park |
| | (MacEwan), 64' |

| 9 April 1966 | Stoke City | 2–0 | Aston Villa |

| 16 April 1966 | Aston Villa | 2–1 | Burnley | Villa Park |
| | (Hateley) (Woosnam) |

| 27 April 1966 | Sheffield Wednesday | 2–0 | Aston Villa |

| 30 April 1966 | Aston Villa | 3–0 | Arsenal | Villa Park |

| 9 May 1966 | Manchester United | 6–1 | Aston Villa |
Note:

| 16 May 1966 | Chelsea | 0–2 | Aston Villa |
| | | | (Hateley) (Woosnam) |

== FA Cup ==
=== Third round ===
The 44 First and Second Division clubs entered the competition at the Third round. The matches were scheduled for Saturday, 22 January 1966. Six matches were drawn and went to replays.

| Tie no | Home team | Score | Away team | Date |
|---|---|---|---|---|
| 8 | Aston Villa | 1–2 | Leicester City | 22 January 1966 |

== League Cup ==
=== Second round ===
| Home team | Score | Away team | Date |
|---|---|---|---|
| Swansea Town | 2–3 | Aston Villa | 21 September 1965 |

=== Third round ===
| Home team | Score | Away team | Date |
|---|---|---|---|
| Sunderland | 1–2 | Aston Villa | 13 October 1965 |

=== Fourth round ===
| Home team | Score | Away team | Date |
|---|---|---|---|
| Fulham | 1–1 | Aston Villa | 3 November 1965 |

Replays

| Home team | Score | Away team | Date |
|---|---|---|---|
| Aston Villa | 2–0 | Fulham | 8 November 1965 |

=== Fifth round ===
| Home team | Score | Away team | Date |
|---|---|---|---|
| West Bromwich Albion | 3–1 | Aston Villa | 17 November 1965 |

== First team squad ==
- (England) Colin Withers, goalkeeper, 25
- (England) John Gavan, goalkeeper, 25
- (England) John Sleeuwenhoek, centre-back, 21
- (Scotland) Charlie Aitken, left-back, 23
- (England) Mick Wright, right-back, 18
- (England) Keith Bradley, right-back, 19
- (England) Graham Parker, midfielder, 19
- (England) Alan Deakin, midfielder, 23
- (England) Ray Bloomfield, midfielder, 20
- (England) Mike Tindall, defensive midfield, 24
- (Scotland) Bobby Park, central midfield, 18
- (England) Lew Chatterley, central midfield, 20
- (Scotland) Johnny MacLeod, right midfield, 26
- (England) Dave Pountney, right midfield, 25
- (England) Tony Scott, left midfield, 24
- (Scotland) Willie Hamilton, forward, 27
- (Scotland) Jimmy MacEwan, right winger, 36
- (England) Alan Baker, second striker, 21
- (England) Barry Stobart, second striker, 27
- (Wales) Phil Woosnam, centre-forward, 32
- (England) Tony Hateley, centre-forward, 24
