= 1966–67 Aston Villa F.C. season =

English football club season

Aston Villa
1966–67 season
- Chairman: Norman Smith
- Manager: Dick Taylor
- Stadium: Villa Park
- First Division: 21st
- FA Cup: Fourth round
- League Cup: Second round

The 1966–67 English football season was Aston Villa's 68th season in the Football League. The era was one of conspicuous underachievement. Dick Taylor's heavy investment in new players failed disastrously, resulting in Villa being relegated to the Football League Second Division for the third time, and plunging the club deep into financial trouble. The period is considered one of decline for the club. Taylor, chief scout Jimmy Easson and second team coach Johnny Dixon were sacked soon afterwards. The former player-manager of promotion winning Mansfield Town, 38-year-old Tommy Cummings was appointed Aston Villa manager in the summer of 1967.

== Football League First Division ==
Pos	Team	Pld	W	D	L	GF	GA	GAv	Pts	Qualification or relegation
18	Fulham	42	11	12	19	71	83	0.855	34	
19	Southampton	42	14	6	22	74	92	0.804	34	
20	Newcastle United	42	12	9	21	39	81	0.481	33	
21	Aston Villa (R)	42	11	7	24	54	85	0.635	29	Relegation to the Second Division
22	Blackpool (R)	42	6	9	27	41	76	0.539	21	Relegation to the Second Division

Source: World Football
Rules for classification: 1) Points; 2) Goal average; 3) Goals scored
(R) Relegated

Matches

20 August 1966	Aston Villa	1–1	Newcastle United	Villa Park
	Lew Chatterley 38	Report

22 August 1966	Aston Villa	0–1	Sheffield Wednesday	Villa Park
		Report

27 August 1966	Arsenal	1–0	Aston Villa
		Report

31 August 1966	Sheffield Wednesday	2–0	Aston Villa
		Report

3 September 1966	Aston Villa	3–0	Manchester City	Villa Park
	Lew Chatterley 27; Tony Hateley 50; Mick Wright 78	Report

5 September 1966	Aston Villa	0–1	Southampton	Villa Park
		Report

10 September 1966	Blackpool	0–2	Aston Villa
		Report	Johnny MacLeod 40; Lew Chatterley 62

17 September 1966	Aston Villa	2–6	Chelsea	Villa Park
	Johnny MacLeod 55; Tony Hateley 56	Report

24 September 1966	Leicester	5–0	Aston Villa
		Report

1 October 1966	Aston Villa	2–3	Liverpool	Villa Park
	Tony Hateley 40, 47 (pen.)	Report

8 October 1966	Aston Villa	3–0	Leeds	Villa Park
	Lew Chatterley 28; John Woodward 42; John Woodward 78	Report

15 October 1966	West Bromwich Albion	2–1	Aston Villa
		Report	Bobby Park 47

22 October 1966	Aston Villa	0–0	Sheffield United	Villa Park
		Report

29 October 1966	Tottenham Hotspur	0–1	Aston Villa
		Report	Lew Chatterley 38

5 November 1966	Aston Villa	3–2	West Bromwich Albion	Villa Park
	Johnny MacLeod 18, 31; Dave Roberts 26	Report

12 November 1966	Fulham	5–1	Aston Villa
		Report	Mike Tindall 51

19 November 1966	Aston Villa	1–1	Nottingham Forest	Villa Park
	Johnny MacLeod 37	Report

26 November 1966	Burnley	4–2	Aston Villa
		Report	Johnny MacLeod 22; Lew Chatterley 78

3 December 1966	Aston Villa	2–1	Manchester United	Villa Park
	Tony Scott 21; Lew Chatterley 81	Report

10 December 1966	Stoke	6–1	Aston Villa
		Report	Johnny MacLeod 20

17 December 1966	Newcastle United	0–3	Aston Villa
		Report	Keith Bradley 17; Tony Scott 51; Lew Chatterley 57

26 December 1966	Sunderland	2–1	Aston Villa
		Report	Own Goal 60

27 December 1966	Aston Villa	2–1	Sunderland	Villa Park
	{Lew Chatterley 43 (pen.); Keith Bradley 73	Report

31 December 1966	Aston Villa	0–1	Arsenal	Villa Park
		Report

14 January 1967	Aston Villa	3–2	Blackpool	Villa Park
	Barry Stobart 25; Lew Chatterley 46; Barry Stobart 51	Report

21 January 1967	Chelsea	3–1	Aston Villa
		Report	Barry Stobart 13
Note: Willie Anderson made his debut.

4 February 1967	Aston Villa	0–1	Leicester	Villa Park
		Report

11 February 1967	Liverpool	1–0	Aston Villa
		Report

25 February 1967	Leeds	0–2	Aston Villa
		Report	(Lew Chatterley), 42'; (Barry Stobart), 50'

4 March 1967	Aston Villa	3–3	Tottenham Hotspur	Villa Park
	(Lew Chatterley), 37'; (Willie Anderson), 64'; (Barry Stobart), 69'	Report

18 March 1967	Sheffield United	3–3	Aston Villa
		Report	(Willie Anderson), 44' (pen.); (Barry Stobart), 74'; (Barry Stobart), 85'

24 March 1967	West Ham United	2–1	Aston Villa
		Report	(Willie Anderson), 13'

25 March 1967	Aston Villa	2–1	Stoke	Villa Park
	(Willie Anderson), 79' (pen.); (John Sleeuwenhoek), 89'	Report

28 March 1967	Aston Villa	0–2	West Ham United	Villa Park
		Report

1 April 1967	Everton	3–1	Aston Villa
		Report	(Johnny MacLeod), 61'

8 April 1967	Aston Villa	1–1	Fulham	Villa Park
	(Barry Stobart), 24'	Report

15 April 1967	Nottingham Forest	3–0	Aston Villa
		Report

19 April 1967	Manchester City	1–1	Aston Villa
		Report	(Lew Chatterley), 86'

22 April 1967	Aston Villa	0–1	Burnley	Villa Park
		Report

29 April 1967	Manchester United	3–1	Aston Villa
		Report	(Willie Anderson), 15'

6 May 1967	Aston Villa	2–4	Everton	Villa Park
	(Barry Stobart), 16'; (Barry Stobart), 69'	Report

13 May 1967	Southampton	6–2	Aston Villa
		Report	(Own Goal), 10'; (Barry Stobart), 58'

Source: avfchistory.co.uk

== FA Cup ==
=== Third round ===
The 44 First and Second Division clubs entered the competition at this stage. The matches were scheduled for Saturday, 28 January 1967. Eleven matches were drawn and went to midweek replays, with Hull City and Portsmouth requiring a second replay at Highfield Road on the following Monday. Bedford Town and Nuneaton Borough were the last non-league clubs left in the competition.

Tie no	Home team	Score	Away team	Date
4	Preston North End	0–1	Aston Villa	28 January 1967

=== Fourth round ===
The matches were scheduled for Saturday, 18 February 1967. Six matches were drawn and went to replays.

Tie no	Home team	Score	Away team	Date
2	Liverpool	1–0	Aston Villa	18 February 1967

== League Cup ==
Second round Ties

Home team	Score	Away team	Date
West Bromwich Albion	6–1	Aston Villa	14 September 1966

== Players ==
Although offered the chance to remain, Manchester United squad player, Willie Anderson (231) decided to join Villa in order to find first team football for a fee of £20,000 in January 1967. Other debut appearances included Peter Broadbent (64), Lionel Martin (57) Dave Rudge (50), and John Woodward (26). In October 1966 Chelsea's offer of £100,000 for Tony Hateley (127) was accepted and he moved to west London.

First team squad

- (England) Colin Withers, goalkeeper, 26
- (England) John Sleeuwenhoek, centre-back, 22
- (Scotland) Charlie Aitken, left-back, 24
- (England) Mick Wright, right-back, 19
- (England) Keith Bradley, right-back, 20
- (England) Mike Tindall, defensive midfield, 25
- (England) Peter Broadbent, midfielder, 32
- (Scotland) Bobby Park, central midfield, 19
- (England) Lew Chatterley, central midfield, 21
- (Scotland) Johnny MacLeod, right midfield, 27
- (England) Dave Pountney, right midfield, 26
- (England) Tony Scott, left midfield, 25
- (England) Alan Deakin, midfielder, 24
- (Scotland) Willie Hamilton, forward, 28
- (England) John Woodward, forward, 19
- (England) Willie Anderson, left winger, 19
- (England) Dave Rudge, left winger, 18
- (England) Barry Stobart, second striker, 28
- (England) Tony Hateley, centre-forward, 25 (until October 1966)
