= 1964–65 Aston Villa F.C. season =

English football club season

Aston Villa
1964–65 season
- Chairman: Chris Buckley
- Manager: Dick Taylor
- Stadium: Villa Park
- First Division: 16th
- FA Cup: fifth round
- League Cup: Semi–Finals

Second City Derby
- 30--20--23

The 1964–65 English football season was Aston Villa's 66th season in the Football League, this season playing in the Football League First Division. The era was one of conspicuous underachievement. Dick Taylor had moved on to Sheffield United in 1956 to work under Joe Mercer, and two years later joined Aston Villa as Mercer's assistant. He took over as manager late in the 1963–64 season after Mercer resigned due to ill-health.

Dick Taylor succeeded in avoiding relegation, which resulted in him being handed the job on a full-time basis but the seasons saw little improvement in form and future financial difficulties loomed.

There were debuts for Colin Withers (146), Johnny MacLeod (125), Keith Bradley (122), Bobby Park (75), Barry Stobart (45), Dave Roberts (19), Ray Bloomfield (3) and Johnny Martin (1). Alan Deakin and Ron Wylie captained the side while top scorer Tony Hateley netted 34, 20 in the league, 4 in the FA Cup and 10 League Cup Goals. Alan Deakin broke his ankle during the 1964–65 season, but recovered to skipper the side for the 1966–67 season. Deakin also played for the England under 23 team.

In November 1964 Aston Villa earned a second consecutive league victory over Burnley with a 1–0 home win.

The FA Cup fifth round matches were scheduled for Saturday, 20 February 1965. Two games required replays during the midweek fixture, and the Aston Villa & Wolverhampton Wanderers match went to a third game the following week, with Wolves the victors.

The Second City Derby saw Villa do the double over Birmingham City. Barry Stobart scored the only goal of the away fixture.

== League table ==
Pos	Team	Pld	W	D	L	GF	GA	GAv	Pts
14	West Bromwich Albion	42	13	13	16	70	65	1.077	39
15	Sunderland	42	14	9	19	64	74	0.865	37
16	Aston Villa	42	16	5	21	57	82	0.695	37
17	Blackpool	42	12	11	19	67	78	0.859	35
18	Leicester City	42	11	13	18	69	85	0.812	35

Source: World Football
Rules for classification: 1) Points; 2) Goal average; 3) Goals scored

=== Matches ===
22 August 1964	Aston Villa	1–2	Leeds United	Villa Park
	Phil Woosnam 3'	Report

26 August 1964	Chelsea	1–2	Aston Villa	Stamford Bridge
		Report	Tony Hateley 75'

29 August 1964	Arsenal	1–3	Aston Villa	Highbury
		Report	Tony Hateley 68'

31 August 1964	Aston Villa	2–2	Chelsea	Villa Park
	Tony Hateley 85', Ron Wylie 90'	Report

5 September 1964	Aston Villa	0–4	Blackburn Rovers	Villa Park
		Report

9 September 1964	Sunderland	2–2	Aston Villa	Roker Park
			Tony Hateley 19', Harry Burrows 24'

12 September 1964	Blackpool	1–3	Aston Villa	Bloomfield Road
			Tony Hateley 31'

14 September 1964	Aston Villa	2–1	Sunderland	Villa Park
	Charlie Aitken 3', Tony Hateley 24'

19 September 1964	Aston Villa	2–0	Sheffield Wednesday	Villa Park
	Harry Burrows 4', Tony Hateley 58'

26 September 1964	Liverpool	1–5	Aston Villa	Anfield
			Tony Hateley 11'

5 October 1964	Aston Villa	1–2	Everton	Villa Park
	Dave Pountney 63'

10 October 1964	West Ham United	0–3	Aston Villa	Boleyn Ground
			—

17 October 1964	Aston Villa	0–1	West Bromwich Albion	Villa Park
	—

24 October 1964	Manchester United	0–7	Aston Villa	Old Trafford
			—

31 October 1964	Aston Villa	2–0	Fulham	Villa Park
	Jimmy MacEwan 38', Gordon Lee 80'

7 November 1964	Nottingham Forest	2–4	Aston Villa	City Ground
			Tony Hateley 33', Harry Burrows 55' (pen)

14 November 1964	Aston Villa	3–0	Stoke City	Villa Park
	Harry Burrows 7', 75', Mike Tindall 62'

21 November 1964	Tottenham Hotspur	0–4	Aston Villa	White Hart Lane
			—

28 November 1964	Aston Villa	1–0	Burnley	Villa Park
	Barry Stobart 48'

5 December 1964	Sheffield United	2–4	Aston Villa	Bramall Lane
			Dave Pountney 72', Harry Burrows 87'

12 December 1964	Leeds United	0–1	Aston Villa	Elland Road
			—

19 December 1964	Aston Villa	3–1	Arsenal	Villa Park
	Alan Baker 55', 80', Johnny MacLeod 65'

26 December 1964	Wolves	1–0	Aston Villa	Molineux
			Alan Baker 27'

2 January 1965	Blackburn Rovers	1–5	Aston Villa	Ewood Park
			Barry Stobart 59'

16 January 1965	Aston Villa	3–2	Blackpool	Villa Park
	Tony Hateley 17', Alan Baker 63', Johnny MacLeod 84'

6 February 1965	Aston Villa	0–1	Liverpool	Villa Park
	—

13 February 1965	Birmingham City	1–0	Aston Villa	St Andrew's
			Barry Stobart 44'

27 February 1965	West Bromwich Albion	1–3	Aston Villa	The Hawthorns
			Barry Stobart 77'

13 March 1965	Everton	1–3	Aston Villa	Goodison Park
			Tony Hateley 44'

15 March 1965	Sheffield Wednesday	1–3	Aston Villa	Hillsborough
			Lew Chatterley 62'

20 March 1965	Aston Villa	2–1	Nottingham Forest	Villa Park
	Tony Hateley 12', 63'

22 March 1965	Aston Villa	3–2	Wolves	Villa Park
	Alan Baker 5', Lew Chatterley 6', 30'

27 March 1965	Stoke City	1–2	Aston Villa	Victoria Ground
			Tony Hateley 51'

31 March 1965	Aston Villa	2–3	West Ham United	Villa Park
	Tony Hateley 29', Charlie Aitken 31'

3 April 1965	Aston Villa	1–0	Tottenham Hotspur	Villa Park
	Alan Baker 15'

10 April 1965	Burnley	2–2	Aston Villa	Turf Moor
			Tony Hateley 8', Charlie Aitken 86'

12 April 1965	Aston Villa	3–0	Birmingham City	Villa Park
	Phil Woosnam 11', Lew Chatterley 16', Tony Hateley 67'

17 April 1965	Aston Villa	2–1	Sheffield United	Villa Park
	Tony Hateley 5' (pen), 89'

19 April 1965	Leicester City	1–1	Aston Villa	Filbert Street
			Phil Woosnam 84'

20 April 1965	Aston Villa	1–0	Leicester City	Villa Park
	Lew Chatterley 57'

24 April 1965	Fulham	1–1	Aston Villa	Craven Cottage
			Tony Hateley 83'
Note: The 31-year-old Ron Wylie played his last Villa match.

28 April 1965	Aston Villa	2–1	Manchester United	Villa Park
	Alan Baker 6', Bobby Park 35'

== FA Cup ==
=== Third round ===
The 44 First and Second Division clubs entered the competition at this stage. The matches were scheduled for Saturday, 9 January 1965. Ten matches were drawn and went to replays, though none of these then resulted in a second replay. Barnet was the last non-league club left in the competition.

Tie no	Home team	Score	Away team	Date
10	Aston Villa	3–0	Coventry City	9 January 1965

=== Fourth round ===
The matches were scheduled for Saturday, 30 January 1965. Six matches were drawn and went to replays. The replays were all played two, three or four days later.

Tie no	Home team	Score	Away team	Date
8	Sheffield United	0–2	Aston Villa	30 January 1965

=== Fifth round ===
The matches were scheduled for Saturday, 20 February 1965. Two games required replays during the midweek fixture, and the Aston Villa & Wolverhampton Wanderers match went to a third game the following week, with Wolves the victors.

Tie no	Home team	Score	Away team	Date
1	Aston Villa	1–1	Wolverhampton Wanderers	20 February 1965
Replay	Wolverhampton Wanderers	0–0	Aston Villa	24 February 1965
Replay	Aston Villa	1–3	Wolverhampton Wanderers	1 March 1965

== League Cup ==
=== Second round ===
Home team	Score	Away team	Date
Luton Town	0–1	Aston Villa	23 September 1964

=== Third round ===
Home team	Score	Away team	Date
Leeds United	2–3	Aston Villa	14 October 1964

=== Fourth round ===
Home team	Score	Away team	Date
Aston Villa	3–1	Reading	4 November 1964

=== Fifth Round ===
Home team	Score	Away team	Date
Aston Villa	7–1	Bradford City	23 November 1964

=== Semi-finals ===
==== First leg ====
Home team	Score	Away team	Date
Aston Villa	2–3	Chelsea	20 January 1965

==== Second leg ====
Home team	Score	Away team	Date	Agg
Chelsea	1–1	Aston Villa	10 February 1965	4–3
