= 1960 FA Cup final =

- Event: 1959–60 FA Cup
Blackburn Rovers	Wolverhampton Wanderers
0	3
- Date: 7 May 1960
- Venue: Wembley Stadium, London
- Referee: Kevin Howley (Billingham)
- Attendance: 98,954

The 1960 FA Cup final was the 79th final of the world's oldest domestic football cup competition, the FA Cup. It took place on 7 May 1960 at Wembley Stadium in London. The match was contested by Blackburn Rovers and Wolverhampton Wanderers.

Wolves won the game after a 3–0 victory, with a Norman Deeley double after Blackburn defender Mick McGrath had scored an own goal. This was Wolves' fourth FA Cup success.

This was the first time the FA Cup winners were given a berth for European competition, into the newly formed Cup Winners' Cup.

Ron Flowers, the last surviving member of the victorious Wolves team, died in November 2021. As of April 2025, Dave Whelan, Peter Dobing and Bryan Douglas are the only surviving players from the Blackburn Rovers team.

== Road to Wembley ==
=== Blackburn Rovers ===
3rd Round	Sunderland	1–1	Blackburn Rovers
3rd Round (Replay)	Blackburn Rovers	4–1	Sunderland
4th Round	Blackburn Rovers	1–1	Blackpool
4th Round (Replay)	Blackpool	0–3	Blackburn Rovers
5th Round	Tottenham Hotspur	1–3	Blackburn Rovers
6th Round	Burnley	3–3	Blackburn Rovers
6th Round (Replay)	Blackburn Rovers	2–0	Burnley
Semi-final	Sheffield Wednesday	1-2	Blackburn Rovers
	(at Maine Road)		

=== Wolverhampton Wanderers ===
3rd Round	Newcastle United	2–2	Wolverhampton Wanderers
3rd Round (Replay)	Wolverhampton Wanderers	4–2	Newcastle United
4th Round	Wolverhampton Wanderers	2–1	Charlton Athletic
5th Round	Luton Town	1–4	Wolverhampton Wanderers
6th Round	Leicester City	1–2	Wolverhampton Wanderers
Semi-final	Aston Villa	0–1	Wolverhampton Wanderers
	(at The Hawthorns)		

== Background ==
Wolverhampton Wanderers were clear favourites going into the match, having won the league title in the previous two seasons and only being denied a third successive championship during this season, after being pipped by just a single point by Burnley. Blackburn Rovers, on the other hand, had not had a great season, finishing in 17th place in only their second season back in top flight football. Both league games between the two during the season had been won by Wolves (3–1 and 1–0).

If current form favoured Wolves, Blackburn had the better FA Cup pedigree historically, with six triumphs already to their name, compared to Wolves' three. They had already displayed their cup strength by eliminating three of the top four clubs that season en route to the final – Burnley, Tottenham Hotspur and Sheffield Wednesday.

== Match ==
=== Summary ===
==== First half ====
The match was one of the warmest cup finals recorded, with many spectators having to be treated for fainting, leading to the game being played at a very sedate pace throughout. The opening 15 minutes set the tone for the contest in both pace and with both teams ruthlessly applying the offside trap to nullify their opponent (leading the TV commentator to eventually dub it 'The Offside Final').

As the half progressed Wolves began to gain control and seemed most likely to open the scoring, with Jimmy Murray mis-hitting with the goal before him. Despite this it was Blackburn who eventually had the most dangerous shot on target when Peter Dobing jinked through Wolves defence to fire at goal, but goalkeeper Malcolm Finlayson was able to block the shot.

Failing to take that opportunity soon proved costly for Blackburn when they suffered a disastrous few minutes. A low cross driven in by Stobart was deflected past Blackburn's goalkeeper by his own unfortunate defender, Mick McGrath to break the deadlock on 41 minutes. Then, two minutes later Blackburn's woes deepened as full-back Dave Whelan fractured his leg in a challenge with Norman Deeley. Though initially overlooked by the referee who allowed play to continue, both men needed substantial treatment. Whelan was eventually stretchered off, and, without the use of substitutes, left his team to complete the game with only 10 men.

==== Second half ====
When the team re-emerged after the interval, Deeley was still labouring and showing signs of discomfort from his clash with Whelan. The continued use of the offside trap, crude and poorly organised by modern standards but largely effective, saved Blackburn falling further behind in the 50th minute when Murray slotted home after Blackburn goalkeeper Harry Leyland fumbled a low Des Horne cross only for Barry Stobart – in modern terms not interfering with play – to be flagged.

Murray came close to getting himself a legitimate goal on 68 minutes when he was left free on the edge of the penalty area, only for Leyland to block his swivelling shot with his legs. From the resulting corner Wolves worked the ball for Horne to pass across the face of the goal, finding Deeley at the far post who drove the ball in to all but seal victory. Wolves then had the ball in the net for fourth time seven minutes later when Ron Flowers tapped-in which was again flagged offside.

Blackburn offered little resistance and failed to create any goalscoring opportunities throughout the second half leaving Wolves to complete the scoring two minutes from time when the Blackburn defence was hesitant in clearing the ball, allowing Deeley to shoot high into the top corner from five yards.

Bill Slater then led the Wolves players up the famous Wembley steps to be presented with the trophy by The Duchess of Gloucester, and the Cup was heading back to Molineux for the fourth time.

=== Details ===
7 May 1960
15:00 BST

Blackburn Rovers	0–3	Wolverhampton Wanderers
	Report	McGrath 41' (o.g.); Deeley 67', 88'

Wembley Stadium, London
Attendance: 98,954
Referee: Kevin Howley (Billingham)

Blackburn Rovers	Wolverhampton Wanderers

1	(England) Harry Leyland
2	(England) John Bray
3	(England) Dave Whelan (substituted off) 43'
4	(England) Ronnie Clayton (c)
5	(England) Matt Woods
6	(Republic of Ireland) Mick McGrath
7	(England) Louis Bimpson
8	(England) Peter Dobing
9	(Northern Ireland) Derek Dougan
10	(England) Bryan Douglas
11	(Scotland) Ally MacLeod
Manager:
(Scotland) Dally Duncan

1	(Scotland) Malcolm Finlayson
2	(England) George Showell
3	(England) Gerry Harris
4	(England) Eddie Clamp
5	(England) Bill Slater (c)
6	(England) Ron Flowers
7	(England) Norman Deeley
8	(England) Barry Stobart
9	(England) Jimmy Murray
10	(England) Peter Broadbent
11	(Union of South Africa) Des Horne
Manager:
(England) Stan Cullis

== Coverage ==
The game was broadcast live on BBC TV's Grandstand programme with commentary by Kenneth Wolstenholme. Only four cameras were used for the entire broadcast, while the use of on-screen score captions, which had been adopted for the first time the previous year, was dropped. Wolstenholme described the game early on as "The White Shirt Final" due to the breathless heat within Wembley Stadium, which led the vast majority of spectators to remove their jackets. As it was still the custom to attend the cup final in "Sunday best" this led to an arena dominated by white shirted spectators.

The press dubbed the game "The Dustbin Final", due in part to the feeling that the game had been "rubbish", but also for the bad reaction by Blackburn fans to the victorious Wolves team as they paraded the cup, with the Wolves players being pelted with match programmes, paper cups and other rubbish accumulated in the stands during the game.

As well as television the game was also broadcast live on BBC Radio, while black and white newsreel footage from both Pathé and Movietone was screened in cinemas that evening.
