= John Bray (footballer) =

English footballer (1937–1992)

John Bray (16 March 1937 – 1992) was an English professional footballer. A right back from the town of Rishton, Bray started his career at Blackburn Rovers, playing for them in the Football League as well as in the 1960 FA Cup Final. After 153 Football League appearances, and 2 goals, Bray moved to Bury for the 1965–66 season, after which he joined Irish side Drumcondra. He later became the player manager at Great Harwood Town.

== Honours ==
Blackburn Rovers

- FA Cup runner-up: 1959–60
