= Gideon Davies =

English professor of chemistry (born 1964)

Gideon Davies FRS FRSC FMedSci
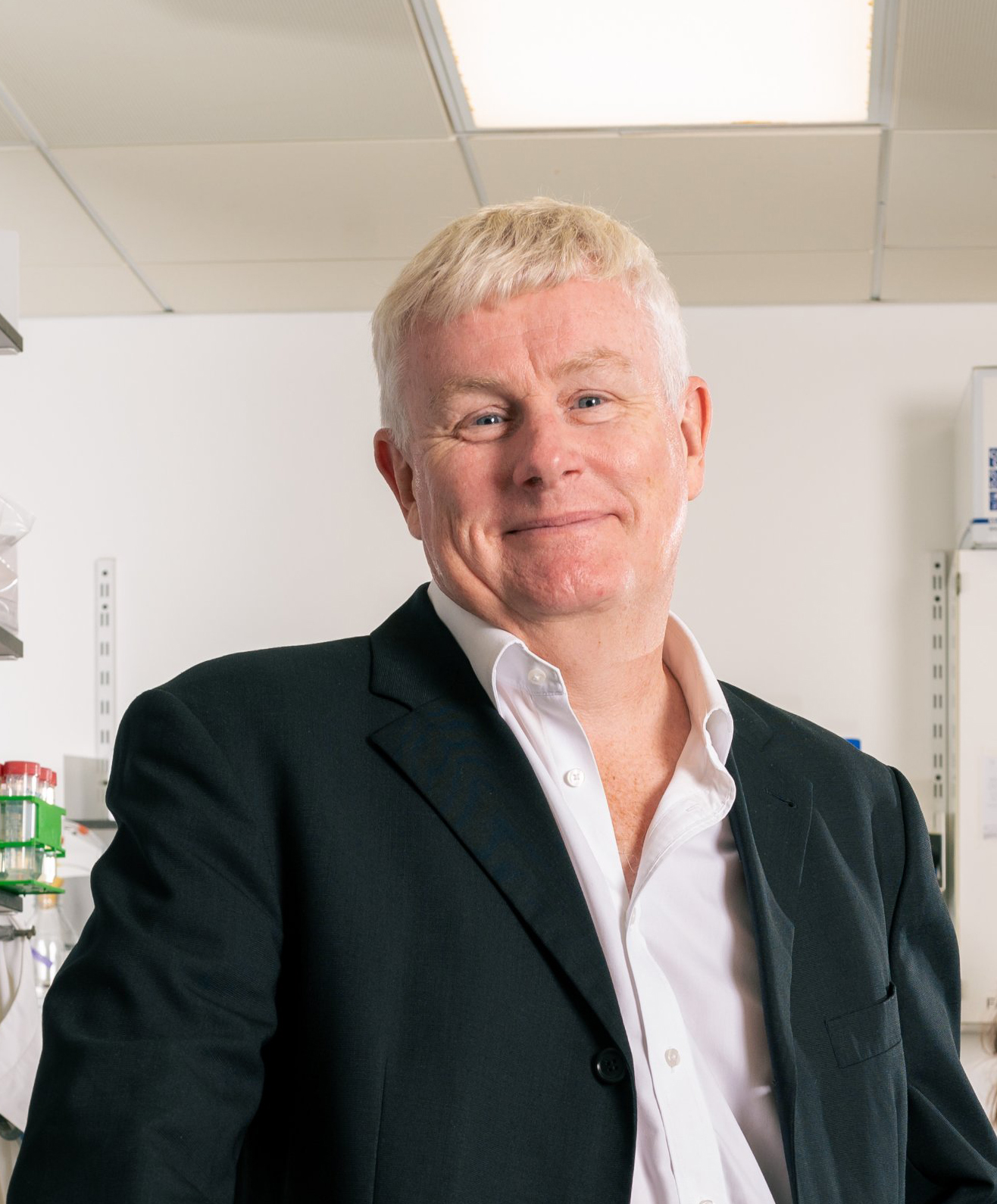
- Davies in 2021
- Born: Gideon John Davies; 6 July 1964 (age 62); Great Sutton, Cheshire
- Education: University of Bristol (BSc, PhD, DSc)
- Known for: Structural enzymology, chemical biology, carbohydrate-active enzymes, glycobiology, industrial biotechnology
- Children: 2
- Awards: Queen's Anniversary Prize (2019); Davy Medal (2015); EMBO Member (2010); Gabor Medal (2010); DSc (2007); Royal Society University Research Fellowship (1996)
- Scientific career
- Fields: Structural Enzymology; Carbohydrate Biochemistry; Glycobiology; Biofuels
- Workplaces: French National Centre for Scientific Research; European Molecular Biology Laboratory; University of British Columbia
- Thesis: Phosphoglycerate kinase from Bacillus stearothermophilus (1990)
- Doctoral advisor: Herman Watson; Len Hall
- Doctoral students: Tracey Gloster
- Website: www.york.ac.uk/chemistry/staff/academic/d-g/gdavies/

Gideon John Davies (born 6 July 1964) is a British structural biologist and chemist known for his research on the structure, mechanism, and biological roles of carbohydrate-active enzymes. He is a professor at the University of York and holds the Royal Society Ken Murray Research Professorship. His research work focusses on understanding how enzymes synthesise, break down, modify and interact with complex carbohydrates.

Davies’s work has contributed to the fields of glycobiology, enzymology and structural biology, particularly in explaining enzyme-substrate interactions and the conformational pathways involved in catalysis. His research has widespread impact, notably in biotechnology and biomedicine, and his work has also led to the development of enzyme inhibitors and probes with applications in disease research, industrial processes, and the study of the human gut microbiome.

He has received several notable honours, including the Davy Medal and the Gabor Medal of the Royal Society, and was part of the YSBL team that won the Queens Anniversary Prize in 2019. He was and has been elected as a fellow of The Royal Society, The Academy of Medical Sciences, The Royal Society of Chemistry, and as a member of the European Molecular Biology Organization (EMBO). Gideon Davies has recently been elected to the Council of the Royal Society.

== Early life and education ==
Davies grew up in Great Sutton, Cheshire and attended Whitby Comprehensive School (now The Whitby High School). He went on to study at the University of Bristol where he received a Bachelor of Science degree in Biochemistry in 1985 followed by a PhD in 1990 for research on the enzyme phosphoglycerate kinase isolated from the bacterium Bacillus stearothermophilus, and supervised by Herman Watson and Len Hall. In 2007, he was awarded a Doctor of Science (DSc) degree from the University of Bristol.

== Career ==
Following his PhD, Davies conducted postdoctoral research at the European Molecular Biology Laboratory (EMBL) outstation in Hamburg, where he worked with Keith S. Wilson on the use of synchrotron radiation in protein crystallography. In 1990, Davies moved to the University of York to work with Dale Wigley and Guy Dodson on the structure solution of DNA gyrase, published in 1991.

During the early 1990s, Davies shifted his research focus to carbohydrate-active enzymes, collaborating with Novo Nordisk (now Novozymes/Novonensis) on the structure and mechanism of cellulases — key enzymes in washing detergents and biofuels. He also spent periods as a visiting researcher at the French National Centre for Scientific Research (CNRS) in Grenoble, working with Bernard Henrissat on enzyme mechanisms, leading to the influential glycosyltransferase classification of the CAZy database. He also collaborated with Alwyn Jones on computer graphics applications and in studying plant polysaccharide-degrading enzymes.

In 1996, Davies was awarded a Royal Society University Research Fellowship, which allowed him to establish his own research group within the York Structural Biology Laboratory. He was promoted to professor at the University of York in 2001 and was awarded a Royal Society Ken Murray Research Professorship in 2016.

In 2000, Davies was the inaugural Peter Wall Catalytic Visitor at the University of British Columbia, where he collaborated with Steve Withers and David Vocadlo on the structural and mechanistic analysis of hen egg white lysozyme.

Davies was elected a member of the European Molecular Biology Organization in 2010 and is a Fellow of the Royal Society of Chemistry (FRSC). In 2010, he was elected a Fellow of the Royal Society (FRS). His Royal Society citation states:

Professor Gideon Davies' research is focused on "structural enzymology". In this he addresses the enzymes, and their accessory domains, that are involved in the synthesis, modification and breakdown of carbohydrates. His chemical and structural insight into protein-carbohydrate interactions and his brilliant exploitation of advanced crystallographic methods provide the basis for understanding how the chemical and structural factors in the stereochemical pathway of the enzyme:substrate complex govern specificity and catalysis. His research is having an immense impact on carbohydrate chemistry and biology and biological catalysis generally.

In 2014, Davies was elected a Fellow of the Academy of Medical Sciences. His citation notes:

Gideon Davies, who is Professor of Biological Chemistry at University of York, has made world-leading contributions to Biochemistry. He has made fundamental additions to our understanding of enzyme mechanism and carbohydrate biochemistry. As a direct result of his work into the conformation of sugars during turnover, he described the rational design of highly potent inhibitors of O-linked glucosamine modifying enzymes. These compounds are showing potential as treatments for Alzheimer's disease. Recently he has turned to study the human microbiota, which are now recognised to be an essential component of human health, and their carbohydrate metabolism is implicated in several disease states.

Davies also serves on the scientific advisory board of Alectos Therapeutics, a private pharmaceutical company focusing on the discovery and development of therapeutics for neurological diseases.

=== Former group members ===
Several of Davies' former students and postdoctoral researchers have advanced to prominent roles in academia and industry. Notably, Tracey Gloster is a professor at the University of St Andrews, recognized for her work on carbohydrate-processing enzymes. David Vocadlo is a professor at Simon Fraser University, holding a Canada Research Chair in Chemical Glycobiology and co-founding Alectos Therapeutics. David Zechel serves as a professor at Queen's University, focusing on enzyme mechanisms and natural product biosynthesis.

=== Research ===
Davies' research focuses on the biological chemistry of carbohydrates, combining structural biology, enzymology, and glycobiology to understand how carbohydrate-active enzymes function at the molecular level. His group has used advanced techniques such as X-ray crystallography and cryo-electron microscopy to study glycoside hydrolases, glycosyltransferases, lytic polysaccharide monooxygenases (LPMOs), and polysaccharide lyases — enzymes critical for biomass degradation, cell wall remodelling, and microbial interactions.

A major focus of Davies' research has been dissecting the structures and catalytic mechanisms of enzymes central to industrial biotechnology, particularly those involved in the degradation of complex polysaccharides such as cellulose, hemicellulose, and starch. By solving the crystal structures of cellulases, xylanases, lytic polysaccharide monooxygenases, and industrial enzymes such as the bacterial α-amylases, his group has provided detailed molecular insights that have informed the design of improved enzyme formulations for applications in biofuel production, biomass conversion, and detergents. His work has thus contributed directly to advancing sustainable industrial processes and bio-based technologies.

His work on glycoside hydrolase mechanisms has provided key insights into substrate distortion, transition states, and conformational pathways, shaping the understanding of enzymatic catalysis and informing the design of selective enzyme inhibitors.

Davies has made major contributions to the discovery and characterization of LPMOs, revealing their role in oxidative polysaccharide degradation and opening new routes for industrial biotechnology applications.

Davies has extensively investigated the enzyme O-GlcNAcase (OGA), which regulates the dynamic post-translational modification of proteins by O-linked N-acetylglucosamine (O-GlcNAc). His structural and mechanistic studies on bacterial and human OGAs and OGTs have provided critical insights into substrate recognition, catalysis, and inhibitor design. These discoveries have laid the foundation for the development of OGA inhibitors as potential therapeutic agents targeting neurodegenerative diseases, particularly Alzheimer’s disease, where abnormal tau phosphorylation plays a critical role.

Davies' work on glycosyltransferases has significantly advanced understanding of the enzymatic mechanisms underlying glycosylation, a process essential for modifying small molecules, lipids, and proteins. His structural studies have elucidated how human, plant and bacterial glycosyltransferases recognize substrates and catalyze the transfer of sugar moieties, with applications ranging from antibiotic biosynthesis to xenobiotic detoxification. His work has provided molecular blueprints for engineering glycosyltransferases with altered specificity or enhanced activity, broadening their biotechnological and pharmaceutical applications.

His research has been funded by the Biotechnology and Biological Sciences Research Council (BBSRC), the European Research Council (ERC), and Alzheimer's Research UK. Davies has published over 400 papers in peer-reviewed journals.

=== Awards and honours ===
Davies has been recognized with numerous national and international awards for his groundbreaking research in carbohydrate enzymology, structural biology, and biotechnology.

He was awarded the Davy Medal (2015) by the Royal Society, one of its premier medals for outstanding contributions to chemistry, recognizing his pioneering structural studies on carbohydrate-active enzymes. He received the Gabor Medal (2010) for interdisciplinary work combining biology and chemistry, notably his insights into enzyme mechanisms and applications in biotechnology.

He is also the recipient of the John and Rita Cornforth Award of the Royal Society of Chemistry in 2020, (jointly with Paul Walton), acknowledging exceptional collaborative research. Other major honours include the Royal Society of Chemistry's Haworth Memorial Lectureship, the Khorana Prize for outstanding contributions through work at the chemistry and life science interface the Corday–Morgan Medal and Prize and the RSC's Dextra Carbohydrate Chemistry Award, highlighting his contributions to chemical biology and enzymology.

Internationally, Davies shared (with Paul Walton and Bernard Henrissat) the IChemE Global Energy Award (2016) for industrial biotechnology innovation leading to biofuels, and the Whistler Award of the International Carbohydrate Organization for his lifelong contributions to carbohydrate science. In 2026 he was awarded the Bruce_A._Stone Award for Excellence in Plant Polysaccharide Biochemistry.

In 2019, the York Structural Biology Laboratory team, including Davies, was awarded the Queen's Anniversary Prize, the highest national honour for UK higher education institutions, for its outstanding research in protein science leading to new drugs, therapies, and improved industrial processes.

== Personal life ==
Davies married Valérie Marie-Andrée Ducros in 1999 (div. 2021) and has two daughters.
