= Dick Taylor (football manager) =

English footballer and manager

Personal information
- Full name: Richard Eric Taylor
- Date of birth: 9 April 1918
- Place of birth: Wolverhampton, England
- Date of death: 1995 (aged 76–77)
- Position: Centre half

Youth career
- –: Wolverhampton Wanderers

Senior career*
Years	Team	Apps	(Gls)
1938–1948	Grimsby Town	36	(0)
1948–1954	Scunthorpe United (Note: Scunthorpe appearances and goals are only for the Football League.)	131	(2)

Managerial career
- 1964–1967: Aston Villa
- * Club domestic league appearances and goals

Richard Eric Taylor (9 April 1918 – 1995) was an English professional footballer and manager. He made 167 appearances in the Football League playing as a centre half for Grimsby Town and Scunthorpe United. The 'ever-smiling' Taylor went on to coach at clubs including Scunthorpe, Sheffield United and Aston Villa, where he was manager from 1964 to 1967.

== Playing career ==
Taylor was born in Wolverhampton, and began his career as an amateur with hometown club Wolverhampton Wanderers. He made his debut in the First Division with Grimsby Town in the 1938–39 season, but his career was disrupted by the Second World War.

He moved on to Scunthorpe United, then playing in the Midland League, in 1948 when he was already 30 years old, and played regular first-team football for five seasons, which included the club's first three years in the Football League. According to a Scunthorpe United match programme feature, he was "the old fashion centre half, brilliant in the air, accurate in his passing and cool in the tackle. Nothing frustrated him".

== Coaching career ==
After retiring as a player Taylor joined Scunthorpe's coaching staff, moving on to Sheffield United in 1956 to work under Joe Mercer, and two years later joined Aston Villa as Mercer's assistant in December 1958.

Aston Villa were bottom of the First Division. Although Mercer & Taylor led them to the FA Cup semi-finals, they were relegated to the Second Division once again. They moulded a talented young side at Villa and the team became known as the "Mercer Minors". Mercer led Villa to victory in the inaugural League Cup in 1961, but suffered a stroke in 1964 and was then sacked by the Aston Villa board upon his recovery in July 1964.

The 46-year-old took over as Villa manager late in the 1963–64 season after Mercer resigned due to ill-health, and succeeded in avoiding relegation, which resulted in him being handed the job on a full-time basis. The next and following season saw little improvement in form, leading Taylor to invest heavily in new players for the 1966–67 season. Unfortunately his investment failed disastrously, resulting in them being relegated to the Second Division of English football and plunging the club deep into financial trouble. It was only the third time Aston Villa had been relegated in the club's history. He was sacked not long afterwards.

Taylor subsequently ran a sports shop near the club's Villa Park stadium which soon took over as equipment suppliers to the club. He remained a frequent visitor to Bodymoor Heath.

In May 1987, Dick was instrumental in bringing future England mananger, Graham Taylor, to Aston Villa. While playing for Scunthorpe, where Graham's father, Tommy Taylor, was the sports reporter for the Scunthorpe Evening Telegraph, Dick had struck-up a strong friendship with the older man and always kept an eye on Tommy's lad's career. It was Dick who sent a letter to Villa chairman Doug Ellis indicating that Graham was open to facing the challenge of managing a major club. Dick's influential recommendation immediately placed Graham Taylor apart from the "has-beens, up-and-comers, and no-chance merchants that apply for every managerial vacancy".

=== Honours as an assistant-manager ===
Aston Villa

- Football League Second Division: 1959–60
- Football League Cup: 1960–61
