= Harry Leyland =

English footballer

Personal information
- Full name: Harry Kenneth Leyland
- Date of birth: 12 May 1930
- Place of birth: Liverpool, England
- Date of death: 6 December 2006 (aged 76)
- Position: Goalkeeper

Senior career*
Years	Team	Apps	(Gls)
1951–1956	Everton	36	(0)
1956–1960	Blackburn Rovers	166	(0)
1960–1966	Tranmere Rovers	180	(0)
Total		382	(0)

Managerial career
- 1967–1968: Wigan Athletic
- * Club domestic league appearances and goals

Harry Kenneth Leyland (12 May 1930 – 6 December 2006) was a Liverpool-born footballer who made 36 Football League appearances for Everton before transferring to Blackburn Rovers. He was outstanding in the 1959–60 FA Cup semi-final against Sheffield Wednesday that Rovers won 2–1, but disappointment followed in the final when already one down Rovers lost Dave Whelan with a broken leg and went on to lose 3–0 to Wolverhampton Wanderers. Leyland later played for Tranmere Rovers (playing 180 League games for them) and for the last 25 years of his life he was very active in the running of New Brighton Rugby Union Football Club, and in January 2009, a stand at their ground was named in his honour. He also managed Wigan Athletic.

== Honours ==
Blackburn Rovers

- FA Cup runner-up: 1959–60
