= The Whitby High School =

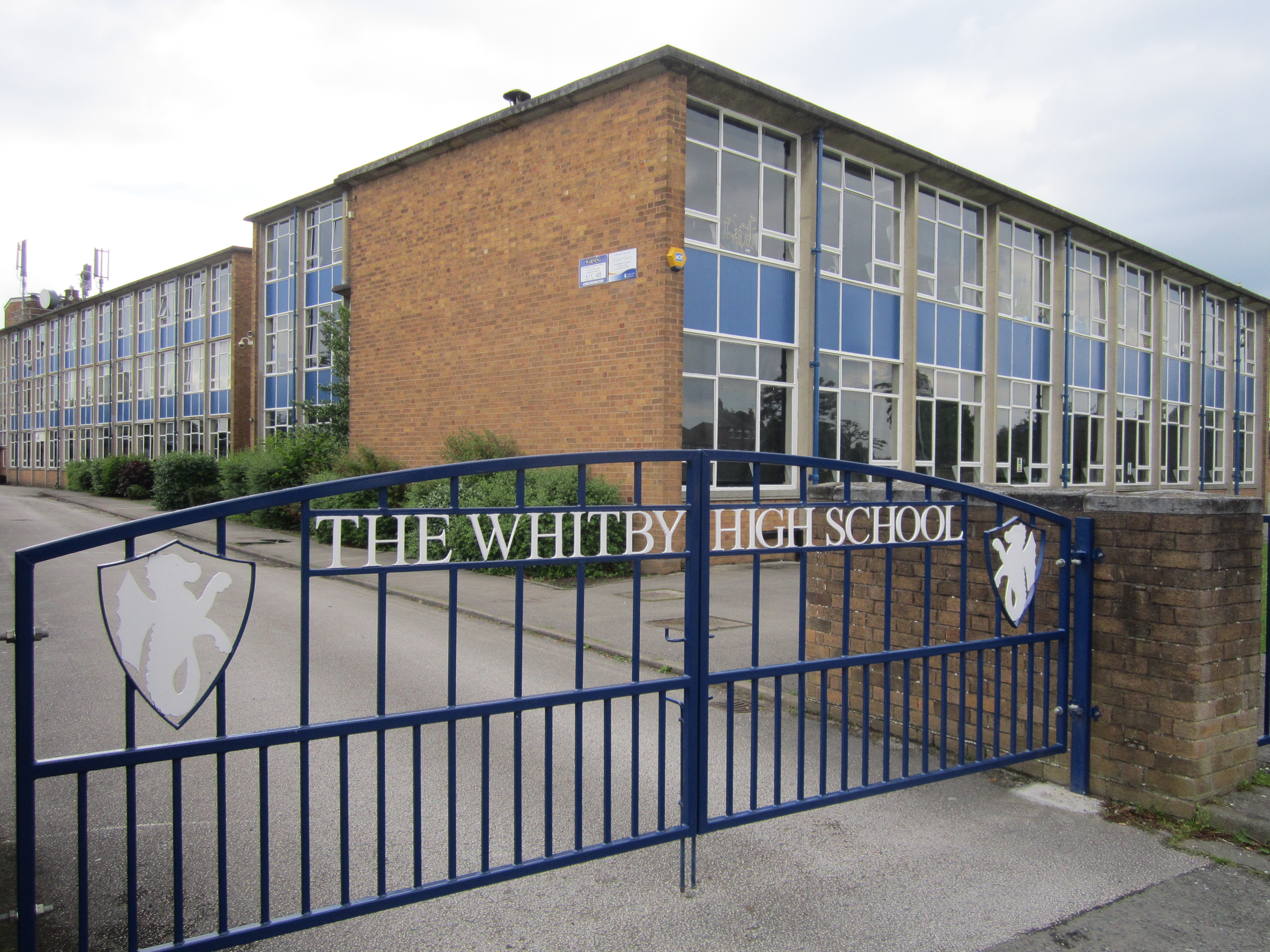
- Gates and main building (2012)

Location
- Sycamore Drive; Ellesmere Port, Cheshire, CH66 3NU; England; 53°15′48″N 2°54′42″W

Information
- Type: Foundation school Founder member of the Seahorse Educational Trust
- Motto: Progrediamur "We Progress"
- Local authority: Cheshire West and Chester
- Department for Education URN: 111429 Tables
- Ofsted: Reports
- Chairman of Governors: D Cooper
- Headteacher: Mrs. Geraldine Fraser
- Gender: Coeducational (mixed)
- Age: 11 to 19
- Enrolment: 1577
- Houses: Hanover, Stuart, Tudor, Windsor, York
- Website: http://www.whitbyhs.cheshire.sch.uk

The Whitby High School is a co-educational secondary foundation school, situated in Whitby, a suburb of Ellesmere Port, Cheshire, England.

== Admissions ==
It is maintained by the Cheshire West and Chester Local Education Authority. The school educates pupils from 11–18 as it has a Sixth Form. It is situated on the A5032 Chester Road in the area known as Whitby near Great Sutton.

== History ==
=== Grammar school ===
The Whitby High School was founded as a coeducational school until a girls' school was built next door in 1963. The new school became Ellesmere Port County Grammar School for Boys, being situated on Chester Road and had around 950 boys. In 1974, the boys' school was one of the first in the country to use a new computer program to help choose careers options.

=== Girls' school ===
The girls' school was called Ellesmere Port Girls' Grammar School and was on Sycamore Drive. It had 850 girls, with 150 in the Sixth Form.

=== Comprehensive ===
Cheshire agreed to go comprehensive, in principle, in 1966. It became a co-educational comprehensive in 1973, being known as Whitby County Comprehensive School, then Whitby Comprehensive School.

== Academic performance ==
GCSE results 2011 are 3rd highest in the region with 89% 5 A*-C, while A level result are above the normal of the area. Now the GCSE results have been raised again as last year 11, got 92% 5 A*-C.

== Notable former students ==
- Dave Challinor, footballer
- Gideon Davies FRS FRSC FMedSci structural and chemical biologist working on structural biology, carbohydrates and glycobiology
- Rob Jones, footballer
- Mark Leckey, artist, won the 2008 Turner Prize
- Jane Parry, Olympic athlete in 4x400 metres relay

=== Ellesmere Port County Grammar School (both sections) ===
- John Basnett, rugby league player
- Karl J. Friston FRS, FMedSci, FRSB, is a British neuroscientist at University College London and an authority on brain imaging
- Beverley Hughes, Baroness Hughes of Stretford
- Paul Jones, footballer
- Kevin Kennerley, footballer
- Roger Allen Leigh, Head of the School of Agriculture since 2006 at the University of Adelaide; Professor of Botany from 1998 to 2006 at the University of Cambridge; President from 2005–7 of the Society for Experimental Biology
- Rick Parry
- Barry Siddall, footballer
- Neil Whatmore, footballer
- Mick Wright, footballer
