= Tracey Gloster =

British biochemist

- Born: Tracey Maureen Gloster
- Education: University of Warwick (BSc); University of York (PhD)
- Scientific career
- Fields: Structural biology Chemical biology Glycobiology; Carbohydrate processing enzymes
- Workplaces: University of St Andrews; Simon Fraser University
- Thesis: Transition state mimicry in glycoside hydrolysis (2005)
- Doctoral advisor: Gideon Davies
- Website: risweb.st-andrews.ac.uk/portal/en/persons/tracey-gloster(d02c38ef-6020-455d-8ec5-d72eeb81ad64).html

Tracey Maureen Gloster is a chemist at the University of St Andrews. Her research interests are in structural biology, chemical biology, glycobiology and carbohydrate processing enzymes.

== Education ==
Gloster studied biochemistry at University of Warwick, graduating in 2002 and then moved to University of York where she was awarded a PhD in chemistry in 2005 for research supervised by Gideon Davies.

== Career and research ==
In her early career she was funded by the Wellcome Trust, initially with a Henry Wellcome post-doctoral fellowship held between 2008 and 2011 at Simon Fraser University, Canada, where she worked with David Vocadlo, and then a Wellcome Trust Research Career Development fellowship in 2012 when she joined the University of St Andrews, Scotland. As of 2022 she holds the position of Reader.

Her research is about all aspects of enzymes that deal with carbohydrates within eukaryotes. Carbohydrates are made from a very wide range of sugar molecules that can be attached to each and other molecules in diverse ways. These glycosylations can have profound consequences for the roles and activities of the molecules and can result in disease if the cell does not process them correctly. Identifying the location and nature of glycosylations is technically challenging, in addition to the challenge of linking them to functions. Gloster has applied inhibitors to gain more understanding about exactly how they work, including describing a new class of glycosyltransferase inhibitors. The techniques that Gloster uses includes ones based around cells, including molecular biology and cell cultures, as well as biophysical methods such as enzyme kinetics, X-ray crystallography and isothermal titration calorimetry.

=== Publications ===
Gloster is the author or co-author of over 50 scientific publications. They include:

- An anti-CRISPR viral ring nuclease subverts type III CRISPR immunity
- Exploitation of carbohydrate processing enzymes in biocatalysis
- Revealing the mechanism for covalent inhibition of glycoside hydrolases by carbasugars at an atomic level
- The enzymatic degradation of heparan sulfate
- Advances in understanding glycosyltransferases from a structural perspective
- Developing inhibitors of glycan processing enzymes as tools for enabling glycobiology

=== Awards and honours ===
Gloster was awarded the Biochemical Society early career research award in 2012, the L’Oreal UK and Ireland Fellowship For Women In Science Fellowship in 2013 and she was awarded the Dextra Medal by the Royal Society of Chemistry in 2019 for her work in carbohydrate chemistry largely conducted in the UK within 15 years of gaining a PhD.

She serves as a member of the Royal Society International Exchanges Committee between 2017 - 2022. She serves as treasurer of the Royal Society of Chemistry Carbohydrate Interest Group. She chairs one of the review panels that judge requests to use the Diamond Light Source.

She is a member of the Young Academy of Scotland.
