= Colin Withers =

English footballer (1940–2020)

Personal information
- Full name: Colin Charles Withers
- Date of birth: 21 March 1940
- Place of birth: Erdington, Birmingham, England
- Date of death: 28 December 2020 (aged 80)
- Height: 6 ft 3 in (1.91 m)
- Position: Goalkeeper

Youth career
- 1956–1957: West Bromwich Albion

Senior career*
Years	Team	Apps	(Gls)
1957–1964	Birmingham City	98	(0)
1964–1969	Aston Villa	146	(0)
1969–1970	Lincoln City	1	(0)
1970–1971	Go Ahead Eagles	29	(0)
1972–1973	Atherstone Town		
- * Club domestic league appearances and goals

Colin Charles Withers (21 March 1940 – 28 December 2020) was an English professional footballer who made 245 appearances in the Football League and a further 29 in the Eredivisie. He played as a goalkeeper, making more than 100 appearances for both Birmingham City and Aston Villa.

The 24-year-old joined Aston Villa in November 1964. In those years Villa lacked success, finishing 16th in both his first two seasons before being relegated in 1966-67. Withers contribution in a struggling side was recognised with him winning the Terrace Trophy in 1965-66 and 1966-67.

Withers also appeared briefly for Lincoln City, before playing in the Netherlands for Go Ahead Eagles. He was capped for England at schoolboy level.
