= Matt Woods (footballer, born 1931) =

English footballer

Personal information
- Full name: Maurice Woods
- Date of birth: 1 November 1931
- Place of birth: Skelmersdale, England
- Date of death: 26 September 2014 (aged 82)
- Place of death: Stockport, Greater Manchester, England
- Position: Defender

Senior career*
Years	Team	Apps	(Gls)
1949	Burscough		
1949–1957	Everton	8	(1)
1957–1963	Blackburn Rovers	260	(2)
1963–1965	Sydney Hakoah	?	(?)
1965–1966	Luton Town	34	(0)
1966–1968	Stockport County	85	(2)
1968–1969	Drumcondra	7	(0)
1969	Altrincham		
- * Club domestic league appearances and goals

Maurice "Matt" Woods (1 November 1931 – 26 September 2014) was a professional footballer who played for Everton, Blackburn Rovers, Sydney Hakoah, Luton Town and Stockport County.

== Honours ==
Blackburn Rovers

- FA Cup runner-up: 1959–60
