= Barry Stobart =

English footballer (1938-2013)

Personal information
- Full name: Barry Henry Stobart
- Date of birth: 6 June 1938
- Place of birth: Doncaster, England
- Date of death: 28 August 2013 (aged 75)
- Height: 5 ft 8 in (1.73 m)
- Position: Forward

Youth career
- Wath Wanderers
- 1953–1955: Wolverhampton Wanderers

Senior career*
Years	Team	Apps	(Gls)
1955–1964	Wolverhampton Wanderers	49	(20)
1964	Manchester City	14	(1)
1964–1967	Aston Villa	45	(18)
1967–1969	Shrewsbury Town	36	(9)
1969	Durban Spurs		
1970	Durban Spurs United	2	(1)
1970–1972	Willenhall Town		

Managerial career
- 1978–1983: Willenhall Town
- 1987–1990: Dudley Town
- * Club domestic league appearances and goals

Barry Henry Stobart (6 June 1938 – 28 August 2013) was an English footballer who played in the Football League as a forward for Wolverhampton Wanderers, Manchester City, Aston Villa and Shrewsbury Town during the 1960s.

== Career ==
Stobart began his football career at Wath Wanderers, the Yorkshire-based nursery club of Wolverhampton Wanderers, before heading south in 1953 to join them, turning professional in 1955.

With the likes of Peter Broadbent, Dennis Wilshaw and Jimmy Murray already established in the forward line, Stobart was consigned to the reserves in his early years. He finally made his first team debut on 5 March 1960, when he scored in a 2–0 win at Manchester United.

Although he made just four league appearances before the 1960 FA Cup Final, his performance in the final league game at Chelsea saw him earn a surprise place in the Cup Final team, at the expense of Bobby Mason. This allowed Stobart to collect the only medal of his career, as Wolves defeated Blackburn 3–0 in the Wembley showpiece. Barry Stobart was given the nickname "Kangaroo Kid" due to his unique ability to jump and score many goals via headers.

The following two seasons saw him only appear occasionally for the first team, and it wasn't until the 1962–63 campaign that he enjoyed a lengthy run in the side, during which he scored 14 goals. The next year saw him again largely relegated to the reserves though, and he left Molineux to join Manchester City in summer 1964.

He failed to settle at Maine Road, and returned to the Midlands within months when he joined Aston Villa in November 1964 for £22,000. He remained at Villa for three years, his best season coming in 1966–67 when he scored 11 times from 20 appearances. He dropped down the divisions in October 1967 to join Shrewsbury Town of the Third Division in a £10,000 deal. After a spell with them, he moved to South Africa to play out his career with Durban Spurs.

His eldest son Sean Stobart was a professional footballer a Scunthorpe United scoring on his first team debut against Rochdale FC.

His youngest son Loy was later also on the professional books at Wolverhampton Wanderers during the early 1990s having signed from Nottingham Forest on a free transfer. He also played for Cheltenham Town FC and Bidvest Witts in South Africa.

== Post Football ==
Barry went on to coach Willenhall Town FC to an FA vase final in 1981 at Wembley and guided semi-pro footballers, John Muir, Brendan Hackett and Russell Bradley to professional careers in Football. After retirement he worked as a greengrocer and finally as a window cleaner in the Sedgley area.

== Vascular dementia ==
In 2005 it was revealed that Stobart suffered from vascular dementia. He resided in a care home from 2009 and died on 28 August 2013.

== Honours ==
Wolverhampton Wanderers

- FA Cup: 1959–60
