= Alan Deakin =

English footballer (1941–2018)

Personal information
- Full name: Alan Roy Deakin
- Date of birth: 27 November 1941
- Place of birth: Balsall Heath, England
- Date of death: 2 January 2018 (aged 76)
- Position: Wing half

Youth career
- –1959: Aston Villa

Senior career*
Years	Team	Apps	(Gls)
1959–1970	Aston Villa	231	(9)
1969–1972	Walsall	50	(0)
1972–1974	Tamworth		
Total		281	(9)

International career
?	England under 23 team	?	(?)
- * Club domestic league appearances and goals

Alan Roy Deakin (27 November 1941 – 2 January 2018) was an English footballer during the 1960s. He was the captain of Aston Villa and also played for Walsall. He is the younger brother of Mike Deakin who also played in the Football League, most notably for Crystal Palace.

== Career ==
Deakin signed for the club as a 15-year-old. He became a regular in the side during the 1960–61 season and collected a League Cup winners' tankard at the start of the following season. He broke his ankle during the 1964–65 season, but recovered to skipper the side for the 1966–67 season. Deakin also played for the England under 23 team.

Deakin left Villa Park for Walsall in 1969, having made 231 league appearances for the club and scored 9 goals. He went on to play 50 league games for Walsall before moving to Tamworth FC for a further 2 years of football then retiring in 1974.

On retirement from the game he became a welder. He lived in Aldridge in the West Midlands and played a number of times for the Aston Villa "Old Stars". He died on 2 January 2018.

== Honours ==
Aston Villa

- Football League Cup: 1960–61
