= Kevin Howley =

English football referee

- Full name: Kevin Howley
- Born: 17 May 1924; Billingham, Stockton-on-Tees, County Durham, England
- Died: 22 July 1997 (aged 73)

Domestic
Years	League	Role
1954–1971	Football League	Referee

International
Years	League	Role
1958–1971	FIFA	Referee / Linesman

Kevin Howley (17 May 1924 – 22 July 1997) was an English football referee from Billingham, Stockton-on-Tees, County Durham, who officiated from 1954 to 1971.

== Career ==
Howley became a Football League referee in 1954 at the age of 30 and four years later reached the FIFA List. While 35 years of age he took charge of the 1960 FA Cup Final between Wolverhampton Wanderers and Blackburn Rovers, at the time the youngest ever referee to do so. A newspaper of the time christened this "The Dustbin Final," because Blackburn supporters, enraged by incidents during the game, threw rubbish at the Wolves players and their manager, Stan Cullis, as they were leaving the arena. Dave Whelan also suffered a broken leg during the first half.

He was involved in a remarkable incident at the end of an FA Cup tie between Crystal Palace and Mansfield Town on 24 November 1962. Palace equalized with a late penalty and Mansfield's outfield players, annoyed at his handling of the match, sarcastically applauded him at the end of the game. As a result, Howley reported all ten Mansfield outfield players to the FA for their conduct. He took charge of the replay two days later which the midland team won resoundingly 7–2.

Howley had the distinction on 22 August 1964 of refereeing the first ever match televised on the BBC's Match of the Day programme in which Liverpool beat Arsenal 3–2. Prior to this he represented England in the 1964 European Nations' Cup Preliminary round, when Spain defeated Romania by 6–0 on 1 November 1962, and also two matches in the qualifying rounds of the renamed competition in 1968, the European Championship. He was selected for the 1966 World Cup, acting as a linesman throughout the tournament, notably for referee Ken Dagnall in the match for third place between Portugal and the Soviet Union at Wembley.

In his final series of 1970-1971 he refereed the European Cup match between U.T. Arad and Red Star Belgrade and a Fairs Cup match between Coleraine and Kilmarnock. The final League match of Howley's career was the match between Tottenham and Arsenal at White Hart Lane on 3 May 1971; Arsenal won the game 1-0 and with it the First Division title, which formed the first part of the Double they achieved that season.^{†} He closed his officiating career by serving as linesman to Jack Taylor in the 1971 European Cup Final at Wembley, his counterpart on the line being fellow Teessider Pat Partridge who took over his place on the FIFA List. He died aged 73 in 1997.
