= David Vocadlo =

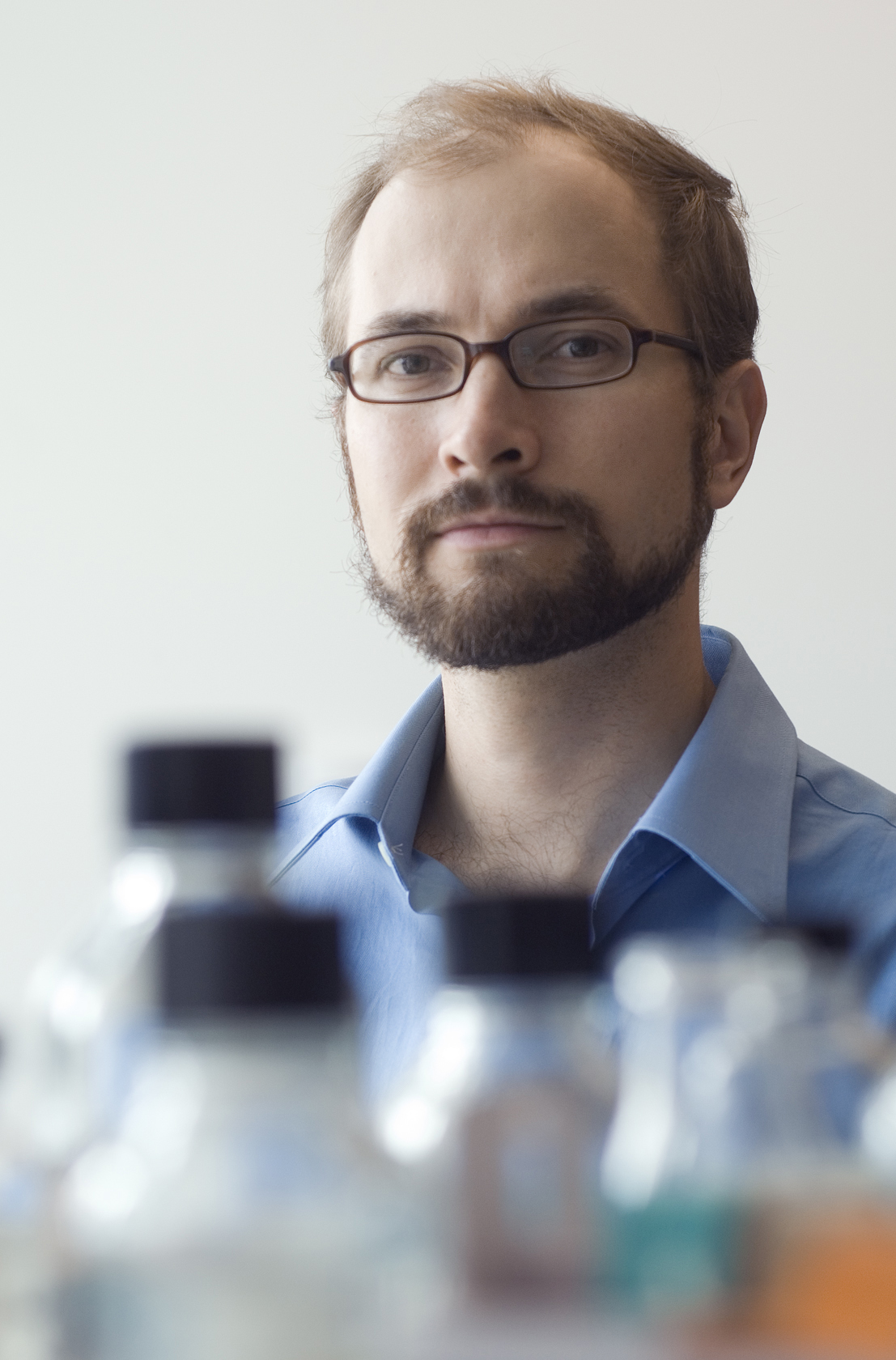
- Vocadlo in 2007
- Born: Brantford, Ontario, Canada
- Spouse: Krystyna
- Children: 2

Academic background
- Education: BSc, Ph.D., Bioogranic Chemistry, University of British Columbia
- Thesis: The catalytic mechanism of retaining [beta]-glycosidases. (2003)

David J. Vocadlo is a Canadian chemical biologist. He is a Tier 1 Canada Research Chair in Chemical Glycobiology and Professor of Chemistry at Simon Fraser University.

== Early life and education ==
Vocadlo was born in Brantford, Ontario, to a Czech father and a Finnish mother who met in Canada. Due to his father's job, Vocadlo lived overseas and in Montreal and Vancouver. He originally enrolled at the University of British Columbia with the intent on becoming an architect but switched to majoring in chemistry and biology. Following the completion of his undergraduate degree, Vocadlo worked as a research assistant in the Biotechnology Laboratory at UBC which prompted him to continue his research. His thesis The catalytic mechanism of retaining [beta]-glycosidases earned him the 2003 Natural Sciences and Engineering Research Council Doctoral Prize. While completing his postdoctoral work at the University of California, Berkeley, Vocadlo accepted a faculty position at Simon Fraser University (SFU) for the 2004–05 academic year.

== Career ==
Upon joining the faculty at SFU as an assistant professor, Vocadlo focused his research on examining how human cells adapt to new situations with the end goal of developing treatments for Alzheimer’s or Type II diabetes. As a Canada Research Chair in chemical glycobiology, Vocadlo synthesized a sugar-like molecule that helps inhibit the progression of Alzheimer's-like symptoms in mice. His work then expanded to focus on understanding and manipulating the enzymes that assemble and break down these glycoconjugates.

By 2010, Vocadlo became the co-founder of Alectos Therapeutics Inc., a molecule drug company and was recognized with a Top 40 Under 40 Award. The following year, he also a recipient of a 2011 E.W.R. Steacie Memorial Fellowship for his investigative research. Vocadlo continued to focus on Alzheimer's disease and uncovered the role of carbohydrate structures in regards to health and disease. In 2013, his research was further recognized with the Horace S. Isbell Award from the American Chemical Society. He was also re-appointed to his role as a Canada Research Chair in Chemical Glycobiology and named to the inaugural cohort of the Royal Society of Canada's College of New Scholars, Artists and Scientists.

== Personal life ==
Vocadlo and his wife Krystyna have two children together.
