= Mick McGrath (footballer) =

Irish footballer (1936–2025)

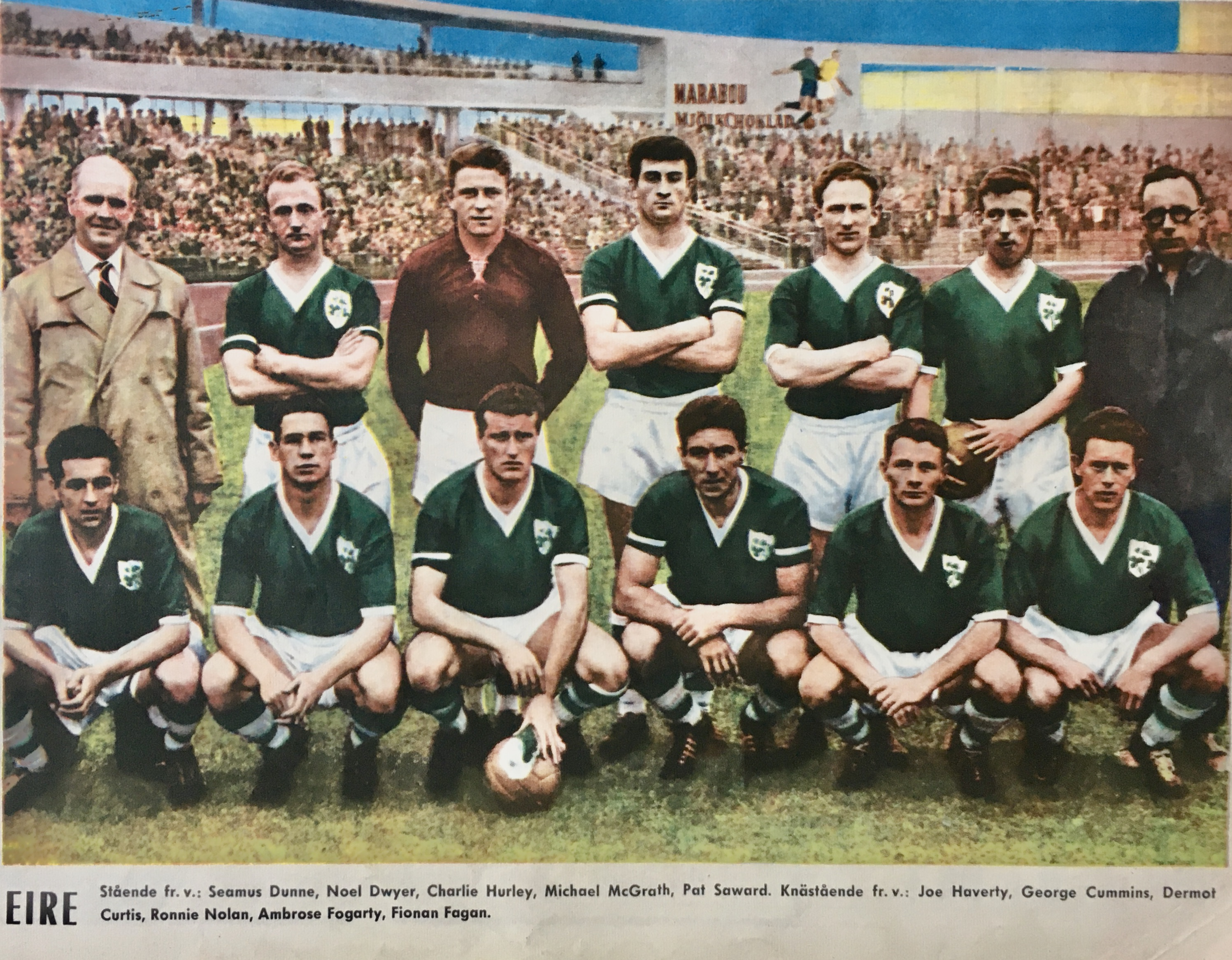
- McGrath (standing, fifth from left) with Ireland in 1960

Personal information
- Full name: Michael McGrath
- Date of birth: 7 April 1936
- Place of birth: Dublin, Ireland
- Date of death: 18 April 2025 (aged 89)
- Position: Left half

Senior career*
Years	Team	Apps	(Gls)
1953–1954	Home Farm		
1954–1966	Blackburn Rovers	269	(8)
1966–1967	Bradford Park Avenue	50	(2)
1967–1968	Bangor City		

International career
1958–1967	Republic of Ireland	22	(0)
- * Club domestic league appearances and goals

Michael McGrath (7 April 1936 – 18 April 2025) was an Irish professional footballer who played as a left half.

== Biography ==
McGrath began his career with Dublin club Home Farm before moving to England to join Blackburn Rovers in August 1954. He made 269 Football League appearances over the next ten years at Ewood Park. and played with players including Peter Dobing, Derek Dougan and Mike England. He helped the club win promotion to the First Division and appeared in the 1960 FA Cup Final where he scored an own goal in a 3–0 defeat to Wolves.

In March 1966 he signed for Bradford Park Avenue where he made 50 league appearances before becoming player manager at Bangor City F.C. He also played 22 times for the Republic of Ireland national team and made one appearance for the Republic of Ireland B team in 1957.

He later lived in Blackburn and retired after 24 years working for Thwaites Brewery.

McGrath died on 18 April 2025, at the age of 89.

== Honours ==
Blackburn Rovers

- FA Cup runner-up: 1959–60
