= Mike Tindall (footballer) =

English footballer (1941–2020)

Personal information
- Full name: Michael Chadwick Tindall
- Date of birth: 5 April 1941
- Place of birth: Birmingham, England
- Date of death: 10 August 2020 (aged 79)
- Position: Midfielder

Senior career*
Years	Team	Apps	(Gls)
1959–1968	Aston Villa	120	(8)
- → New York Americans (loan)
1968–1969	Walsall	7	(0)
1969–?	Tamworth		
Total		127	(7)

International career
- England youth
- * Club domestic league appearances and goals

Michael Chadwick Tindall (5 April 1941 – 10 August 2020) was an English professional footballer who was born in Birmingham and is best known for his career with Aston Villa. His playing position was wing-half.

== Club career ==
After Villa, he moved to Walsall briefly before dropping into the non-League to play for Tamworth. He also played in the United States for the New York Americans. In November 1964, Tindall broke his leg while playing for Aston Villa against Tottenham Hotspur at White Hart Lane.

== International career ==
Tindall played for the England youth team but never represented the senior side.

== Later life and death ==
Tindall died in August 2020 after suffering from dementia.
