= 1963–64 Aston Villa F.C. season =

English football club season

Aston Villa
1963–64 season
- Manager: Joe Mercer
- Stadium: Villa Park
- First Division: 19th
- FA Cup: Third round
- League Cup: Third round

Second City Derby
- 28--20--23

The 1963–64 English football season was Aston Villa's 65th season in The Football League. Villa played in the First Division.

Winning the League Cup in 1961 had been the recent pinnacle for the club. Although Villa finished seventh in 1961–62, the following season saw the beginning of a decline in form that would see them finish in 15th place in 1963 and fourth from the bottom in 1964. Manager Joe Mercer parted company with the club in July 1964 because of these results and his declining health.

John Lennon's In His Own Write received critical acclaim when published in 1964, with favourable reviews in London's The Sunday Times and The Observer. Among the most popular poems in the collection was "Deaf Ted, Danoota, (and me)". with the fifth verse:

Thorg Billy grows and Burnley ten,
And Aston Villa three
We clobber ever gallup
Deaf Ted, Danoota, and me.

In the Second City derby Villa lost the home fixture but held Birmingham to a draw at St Andrews.

There were debuts for Mick Wright (282), Tony Hateley (127), Dave Pountney (113), Graham Parker (21), Bob Wilson (9), and Stan Horne (6).

== Table ==
Pos	Team	Pld	W	D	L	GF	GA	GAv	Pts	Qualification or relegation
17	Stoke City	42	14	10	18	77	78	0.987	38	
18	Blackpool	42	13	9	20	52	73	0.712	35	
19	Aston Villa	42	11	12	19	62	71	0.873	34	
20	Birmingham City	42	11	7	24	54	92	0.587	29	
21	Bolton Wanderers (R)	42	10	8	24	48	80	0.600	28	Relegation to the Second Division

Source: World Football
Rules for classification: 1) Points; 2) Goal average; 3) Goals scored
(R) Relegated

=== Matches ===
24 August 1963	Nottingham Forest	0–1	Aston Villa	City Ground
		Report	Tony Hateley 26'
Note: 21-year-old Hateley scores the winner on his debut.

26 August 1963	Aston Villa	1–3	Stoke City	Villa Park
	Tony Hateley	Report

31 August 1963	Aston Villa	1–2	Blackburn	Villa Park
	Own goal 74'	Report

4 September 1963	Stoke City	2–2	Aston Villa	Victoria Ground
		Report	Harry Burrows 39', Tony Hateley 83'

7 September 1963	Blackpool	0–4	Aston Villa	Bloomfield Road
		Report	Alan Deakin 16', Harry Burrows 42', 56', 67'

10 September 1963	Arsenal	3–0	Aston Villa	Highbury
		Report	—

14 September 1963	Aston Villa	2–0	Chelsea	Villa Park
	Jimmy MacEwan 13', Tony Hateley 79'	Report

16 September 1963	Aston Villa	2–4	Tottenham	Villa Park
	Own goal 33', Alan Baker	Report

21 September 1963	West Ham	0–1	Aston Villa	Boleyn Ground
		Report	Harry Burrows 11'

28 September 1963	Aston Villa	0–1	Sheffield United	Villa Park
	—

5 October 1963	Liverpool	5–2	Aston Villa	Anfield
			Tony Hateley 34', 44'

7 October 1963	Aston Villa	0–1	Everton	Villa Park
	—

12 October 1963	West Bromwich Albion	4–3	Aston Villa	The Hawthorns
			Own goal 21', Mike Tindall 22', Tony Hateley 88'

19 October 1963	Aston Villa	2–1	Arsenal	Villa Park
	Tony Hateley 57' (pen), 85'

26 October 1963	Sheffield Wednesday	1–0	Aston Villa	Hillsborough
			—

2 November 1963	Aston Villa	3–0	Bolton	Villa Park
	Tommy Ewing 47', Harry Burrows 54', 77'

9 November 1963	Fulham	2–0	Aston Villa	Craven Cottage
			—

16 November 1963	Aston Villa	4–0	Manchester United	Villa Park
	Tony Hateley 1', 52', Alan Deakin 17', Harry Burrows 89'

23 November 1963	Burnley	2–0	Aston Villa	Turf Moor
			—

30 November 1963	Aston Villa	0–0	Ipswich Town	Villa Park
	—

7 December 1963	Leicester City	0–0	Aston Villa	Filbert Street
			—

14 December 1963	Aston Villa	3–0	Nottingham Forest	Villa Park
	Harry Burrows 24', Jimmy MacEwan 25', Own goal 36'

21 December 1963	Blackburn	2–0	Aston Villa	Ewood Park
			—

26 December 1963	Wolves	3–3	Aston Villa	Molineux
			Dave Pountney 68', Vic Crowe 75', Tony Hateley 90'

28 December 1963	Aston Villa	2–2	Wolves	Villa Park
	Harry Burrows 32', 48'

11 January 1964	Aston Villa	3–1	Blackpool	Villa Park
	Phil Woosnam 27', 89', Tony Hateley 65'

18 January 1964	Chelsea	1–0	Aston Villa	Stamford Bridge
			—

25 January 1964	Tottenham	3–1	Aston Villa	White Hart Lane
			Harry Burrows 82' (pen)

1 February 1964	Aston Villa	2–2	West Ham	Villa Park
	Harry Burrows 10', Phil Woosnam 49'

8 February 1964	Sheffield United	1–1	Aston Villa	Bramall Lane
			Ron Wylie 7'

19 February 1964	Liverpool	2–2	Aston Villa	Anfield
			Ron Wylie 5', Harry Burrows 9'

22 February 1964	Aston Villa	1–0	West Bromwich Albion	Villa Park
	Phil Woosnam 81'

28 February 1964	Everton	4–2	Aston Villa	Goodison Park
			Harry Burrows 6', George Graham 75'

7 March 1964	Aston Villa	2–2	Sheffield Wednesday	Villa Park
	Tony Hateley 6', Charlie Aitken 83'

21 March 1964	Aston Villa	2–2	Fulham	Villa Park
	Harry Burrows 35', Mike Tindall 69'

28 March 1964	Bolton	1–1	Aston Villa	Burnden Park
			Tony Hateley 20'

30 March 1964	Aston Villa	0–3	Birmingham City	Villa Park
	—

31 March 1964	Birmingham City	3–3	Aston Villa	St Andrew's
			Lew Chatterley 2', 30', Mike Tindall 13'

4 April 1964	Aston Villa	2–0	Burnley	Villa Park
	Tony Hateley 54', 58'

6 April 1964	Manchester United	1–0	Aston Villa	Old Trafford
			—

11 April 1964	Ipswich Town	4–3	Aston Villa	Portman Road
			Dave Pountney 32', 82', Ron Wylie 61'

18 April 1964	Aston Villa	1–3	Leicester City	Villa Park
	Alan Deakin 75'

== FA Cup ==
The 44 First and Second Division clubs entered the competition at this stage. The matches were scheduled for Saturday, 4 January 1964. Nine matches were drawn and went to replays, though none of these then resulted in a second replay.

Tie no	Home team	Score	Away team	Date
9	Aston Villa	0–0	Aldershot	4 January 1964
Replay	Aldershot	2–1	Aston Villa	8 January 1964

== League Cup ==
=== Second round ===
Home team	Score	Away team	Date
Aston Villa	3–1	Barnsley	25 September 1963

=== Third round ===
Home team	Score	Away team	Date
Aston Villa	0–2	West Ham United	16 October 1963

== Sources ==
- Burns, Gary (2009). "Beatles news: product line extensions and the rock canon". In Womack, Kenneth (ed.). The Cambridge Companion to the Beatles. Cambridge: Cambridge University Press. pp. 217–229. ISBN 978-0-521-68976-2.
- Everett, Walter (2001). The Beatles as Musicians: The Quarry Men through Rubber Soul. New York: Oxford University Press. ISBN 978-0-19-514105-4.
- Savage, Jon (2010). Foreword. In His Own Write and A Spaniard in the Works. By Lennon, John. London: Vintage Books. pp. vii–x. ISBN 978-0-09-953042-8.
