= Mick Wright (footballer, born 1946) =

English footballer

Personal information
- Full name: John Michael Wright
- Date of birth: 25 September 1946 (age 80)
- Place of birth: Ellesmere Port, England
- Position: Right back

Youth career
- –: Ellesmere Port
- 1962–1963: Aston Villa

Senior career*
Years	Team	Apps	(Gls)
1963–1973	Aston Villa	282	(1)
- * Club domestic league appearances and goals

John Michael Wright (born 25 September 1946) is an English former professional footballer who made 282 appearances in the Football League playing as a right back for Aston Villa. Wright started his career at Ellesmere Port Grammar School and Ellesmere Port F.C. His career was cut short when he had to retire through injury.
