= Willie Hamilton (footballer, born 1938) =

Scottish footballer (1938–1976)

Personal information
- Full name: William Murdoch Hamilton
- Date of birth: 16 February 1938
- Place of birth: Chapelhall, Scotland
- Date of death: 22 October 1976 (aged 38)
- Place of death: Calgary, Canada
- Height: 5 ft 9 in (1.75 m)
- Position: Forward

Youth career
- 1954–1956: Drumpelier Amateurs

Senior career*
Years	Team	Apps	(Gls)
1956–1961	Sheffield United	79	(21)
1961–1962	Middlesbrough	10	(1)
1962–1963	Heart of Midlothian	30	(12)
1963–1965	Hibernian	50	(15)
1965–1967	Aston Villa	49	(9)
1967–1969	Heart of Midlothian	22	(7)
1969	Durban United		
1969–1971	Ross County	0	(0)
1971–1972	Hamilton Academical	13	(0)
Total		253	(65)

International career
1962–1965	Scottish League XI	2	(0)
1965	Scotland	1	(0)
- * Club domestic league appearances and goals

William Murdoch Hamilton (16 February 1938 – 22 October 1976) was a Scottish footballer, who played for Sheffield United, Middlesbrough, Heart of Midlothian, Hibernian and Aston Villa, and gained one cap for Scotland. He became known for his off field lifestyle which overshadowed his playing ability. His one-time manager Jock Stein later described him as comparable to Kenny Dalglish in footballing talent.

== Career ==
Following spells in English football with Sheffield United and Middlesbrough, Hamilton joined Hearts in June 1962 and was then signed for Hibernian by Jock Stein. Despite having handed in a transfer request shortly before Stein's arrival, Stein was able to get some astonishing performances out of Hamilton during his time at Easter Road. Stein would sometimes put up Hamilton in his own house on the eve of a big match to make sure he did not go out drinking. Hibernian's results had dramatically picked up during Stein's reign, partly attributable to the performances of Hamilton. However, Stein left Hibernian after less than a year to become manager of Celtic.

He emigrated to Canada in 1975 where he worked as a bricklayer. He died of a heart attack in 1976.
