= Bobby Park (footballer, born 1946) =

Scottish footballer (1946–2019)

Personal information
- Full name: Robert Clydesdale Park
- Date of birth: 3 July 1946
- Place of birth: Edinburgh, Scotland
- Date of death: 23 July 2019 (aged 73)
- Positions: Wing half; inside forward

Youth career
- Middlesbrough
- 1961–1963: Aston Villa

Senior career*
Years	Team	Apps	(Gls)
1963–1969	Aston Villa	75	(7)
1969–1972	Wrexham	102	(8)
1972–1973	Peterborough United	18	(1)
1973–1974	Northampton Town	24	(0)
1974–1975	Hartlepool United	17	(0)
- * Club domestic league appearances and goals

Robert Clydesdale Park (3 July 1946 – 23 July 2019) was a Scottish footballer.

== Career ==
Park would come up through the Aston Villa youth ranks, signing as a professional with them in 1963.

Park would stay at Villa for 6 years, before moving to Wrexham where he made over 100 appearances for the Welsh club.

After his time at Wrexham, he would spend a season at Peterborough United, a season at Northampton Town and a season at Hartlepool United.

== Death ==
Park died on 23 July 2019 after a battle with cancer.
