= Tony Hateley =

English footballer

Personal information
- Birth name: Anthony Hateley
- Date of birth: 13 June 1941
- Place of birth: Derby, England
- Date of death: 1 February 2014 (aged 72)
- Place of death: Preston, England
- Position: Striker

Senior career*
Years	Team	Apps	(Gls)
1958–1963	Notts County	131	(77)
1963–1966	Aston Villa	127	(68)
1966–1967	Chelsea	27	(6)
1967–1968	Liverpool	56	(28)
1968–1969	Coventry City	17	(4)
1969–1970	Birmingham City	28	(6)
1970–1972	Notts County	57	(32)
1973–1974	Oldham Athletic	5	(1)
1974	Boston Minutemen	3	(0)
1974-1975	Bromsgrove Rovers		
1975-1976	Prescot Town		
1976-1977	Barrow		
Total		451	(218)
- * Club domestic league appearances and goals

Anthony Hateley (13 June 1941 – 1 February 2014) was an English professional footballer who played as a centre forward. He scored 249 goals from 499 appearances in the Football League, and played First Division football for Aston Villa, Chelsea, Liverpool and Coventry City. In the lower divisions, he scored 109 goals from 188 league matches in two spells with Notts County, and also played for Birmingham City and Oldham Athletic. He was the father of England international footballer Mark Hateley and grandfather of footballer Tom Hateley.

== Early life ==
Hateley was born in Derby on 13 June 1941. He was educated at Normanton Junior School.

== Playing career ==
Hateley started his career with Notts County, where he first established himself as a prolific goalscorer, especially through his heading ability, and scored 77 league goals in 131 matches. The club won promotion to the Third Division in 1960–61.

Hateley's goals earned him a move to County's Midlands rivals Aston Villa in 1963. The 21-year-old scored the winner on his debut, a 1-0 home victory over Forest. He continued his prolific scoring record at Villa, once scoring four second-half goals as Villa came from 5–1 down to draw 5–5 with Tottenham Hotspur, and his 86 goals in less than 150 games played a significant part in saving the club from relegation to the Second Division.

In October 1966 Chelsea's offer of £100,000 for Hateley was accepted and he moved to west London. The £100,000 fee Chelsea manager Tommy Docherty paid for Hateley was a club record and he arrived as a replacement for recent broken leg victim Peter Osgood. However, Chelsea's game had previously been based around quick passing and movement, while Hateley had thrived on crosses and long balls, meaning the team's style had to be adapted to accommodate him. Though his aerial ability was one of the best in his era, Hateley's technical ability was more lacking – Docherty once commented that Hateley's passes ought to be labelled "to whom it may concern" – and he struggled at the club. He scored six league goals during the season, and the highlight of his time at Chelsea came in the FA Cup semi-final against Leeds United when he headed in the winning goal at Villa Park. He also played in Chelsea's 2–1 final loss to Tottenham Hotspur at Wembley.

Having scored a total of nine goals in 33 appearances, in June 1967 Hateley was sold to Bill Shankly's Liverpool, who broke his own club's record in paying £96,000 for him. He scored 27 goals for Liverpool in the 1967–68 season, including hat-tricks against Newcastle United and Nottingham Forest, but once again Hateley's style did not suit his team's and he moved on after a year, this time to Coventry City. After a season at Coventry he was sold to Birmingham City and then returned to his first club, Notts County, where he rediscovered his scoring touch and led them to the Fourth Division title in 1970–71. After a brief stint at Oldham Athletic and 3 matches for the Boston Minutemen in the North American Soccer League he retired from the game in 1974, having scored almost 250 career goals. He was never capped for England.

After his retirement from the professional game he played in non-League for Bromsgrove Rovers and in season 1975-76 he returned to Merseyside and played for Prescot Town in the Mid-Cheshire League.

At the time of his retirement his combined transfer fees were a record for a single player in English football.

== After football ==
In his later years Hateley had Alzheimer's disease. He died aged 72 on 1 February 2014.

== Honours ==
Chelsea

- FA Cup runner-up: 1966–67
