= Johnny MacLeod =

Scottish footballer

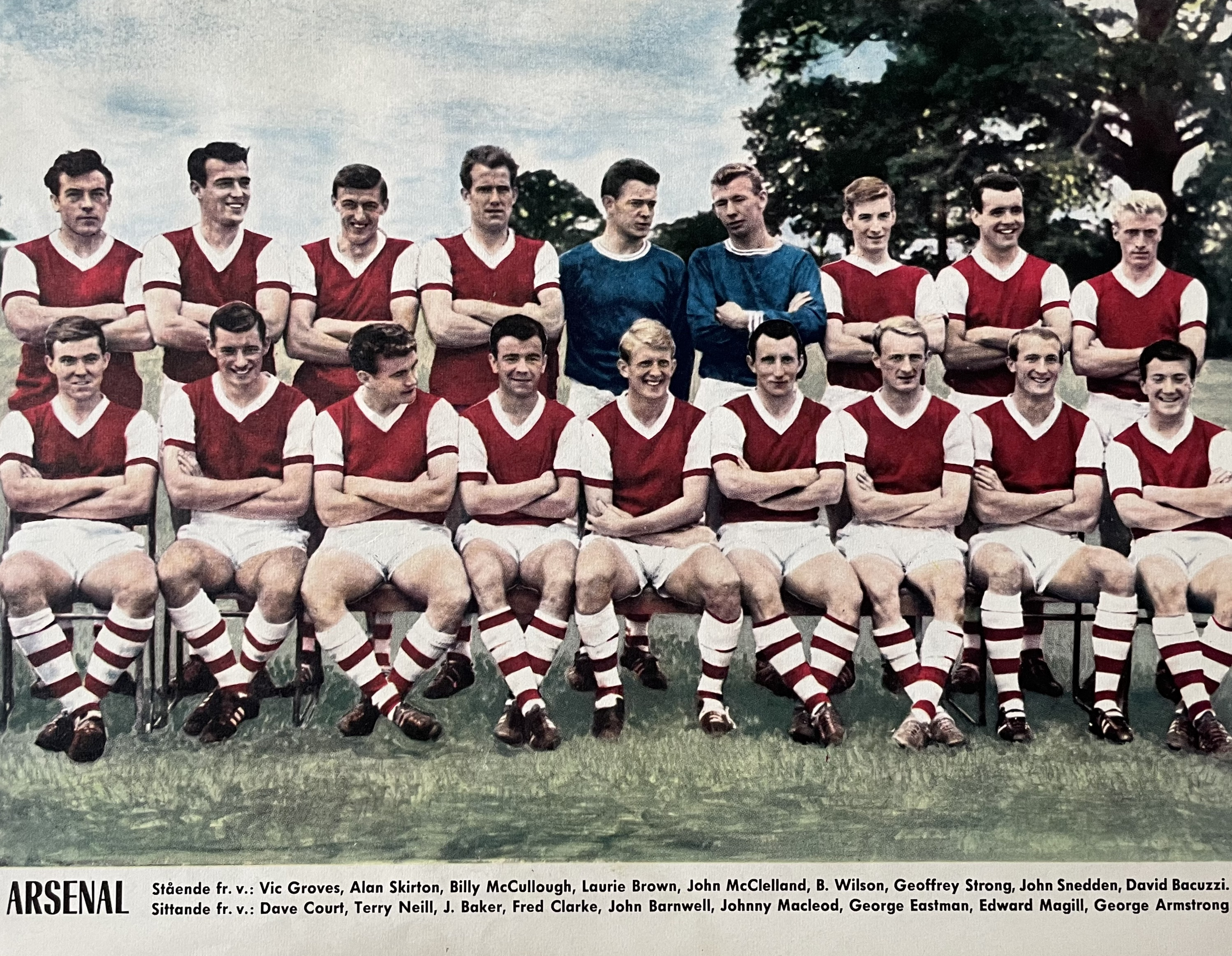

Personal information
- Full name: John Murdoch MacLeod
- Date of birth: 23 November 1938 (age 87)
- Place of birth: Edinburgh, Scotland
- Position: Winger

Youth career
- 1954–1955: Edinburgh Thistle
- 1955–1957: Armadale Thistle

Senior career*
Years	Team	Apps	(Gls)
1957–1961	Hibernian	101	(28)
1961–1964	Arsenal	130	(23)
1964–1968	Aston Villa	125	(16)
1968–1971	KV Mechelen	116	(3)
1971–1972	Raith Rovers	15	(5)
1972–1975	Newtongrange Star		

International career
1961–1962	SFA trial v SFL	2	(0)
1961	Scotland U23	1	(0)
1961	Scottish League XI	1	(0)
1961	Scotland	4	(0)
- * Club domestic league appearances and goals

John Murdoch MacLeod (born 23 November 1938) is a Scottish former footballer who played as a winger.

== Career ==
Born in Edinburgh, MacLeod started his career at his local club, Hibernian, and played 85 times for the Edinburgh side between 1957 and 1961, where he made a name for himself as a talented right winger. He also earned four caps for Scotland, all in 1961. His debut was in an infamous 9–3 defeat at the hands of England and the last appearance was in a 4–0 defeat by Czechoslovakia in a 1962 FIFA World Cup qualification tie.

In July 1961 MacLeod was signed by Arsenal for £40,000 (then a record fee for a winger) and made his debut against Burnley on 19 August 1961. He became a regular for the next three seasons, playing over thirty games in each. In total, he made 112 appearances for Arsenal, scoring 27 goals, despite manager Billy Wright's policy of usually employing only one winger on the pitch. Arsenal were not particularly successful at this time, usually finishing around mid-table, although they did make their European debut, in the Inter-Cities Fairs Cup, in 1963–64. MacLeod scored the opening goal in Arsenal's very first European match, a 7–1 thrashing of Stævnet on 25 September 1963.

In September 1964, with the young George Armstrong pushing for a place in the side, Arsenal found MacLeod surplus to requirements and sold him to Aston Villa for £35,000. He spent four seasons at Villa Park making 123 league appearances, before moving to Belgium to play for KV Mechelen in 1968. In 1971, he returned to his native Scotland to see out his career at Raith Rovers. He retired from playing in 1972.
