= 1959–60 FA Cup =

Tournament details
- Country: England; Wales

Final positions
- Champions: Wolverhampton Wanderers (4th title)
- Runners-up: Blackburn Rovers

The 1959–60 FA Cup was the 79th staging of the world's oldest football cup competition, the Football Association Challenge Cup, commonly known as the FA Cup. Wolverhampton Wanderers won the competition for the fourth time, beating Blackburn Rovers 3–0 in the final at Wembley.

Matches were scheduled to be played at the stadium of the team named first on the date specified for each round, which was always a Saturday. Some matches, however, might be rescheduled for other days if there were clashes with games for other competitions or the weather was inclement. If scores were level after 90 minutes had been played, a replay would take place at the stadium of the second-named team later the same week. If the replayed match was drawn further replays would be held until a winner was determined. If scores were level after 90 minutes had been played in a replay, a 30-minute period of extra time would be played.

== Calendar ==
Round	Date
Preliminary round	5 September 1959
First qualifying round	19 September 1959
Second qualifying round	3 October 1959
Third qualifying round	17 October 1959
Fourth qualifying round	31 October 1959
First round proper	14 November 1959
Second round proper	5 December 1959
Third round proper	9 January 1960
Fourth round proper	30 January 1960
Fifth round proper	20 February 1960
Sixth round proper	12 March 1960
Semi-finals	26 March 1960
Final	7 May 1960

== Qualifying rounds ==
Most participating clubs that were not members of the Football League competed in the qualifying rounds to secure one of 30 places available in the first round.

The winners from the fourth qualifying round were Scarborough, West Auckland Town, South Shields, Blyth Spartans, Shildon, Rhyl, Prescot Cables, Burscough, Hereford United, Oswestry Town, Matlock Town, Gainsborough Trinity, Kettering Town, Wisbech Town, Peterborough United, King's Lynn, Chelmsford City, Bedford Town, Enfield, Walthamstow Avenue, Headington United, Wycombe Wanderers, Margate, Hastings United, Ashford Town (Kent), Salisbury, Barnstaple Town, Dorchester Town, Cheltenham Town and Bath City.

Those appearing in the competition proper for the first time were West Auckland Town and Burscough, while Enfield had last featured at this stage in 1937-38 and Matlock Town had last done so in 1887-88.

== First round proper ==
At this stage the 48 clubs from the Football League Third and Fourth Divisions joined the 30 non-league clubs that came through the qualifying rounds. The final two non-league sides in the main draw, Crook Town and Barnet were given byes to this round as the champions and runners-up from the previous season's FA Amateur Cup.

Matches were scheduled to be played on Saturday, 14 November 1959. Ten were drawn and went to replays, played on 17–19 November.

Tie no	Home team	Score	Away team	Attendance
1	Enfield	4–3	Headington United	
2	Darlington	4–0	Prescot Cables	
3	Hastings United	1–2	Notts County	
4	Bath City	3–1	Millwall	
5	Bury	5–0	Hartlepools United	
6	Dorchester Town	1–2	Port Vale	
7	Rochdale	2–2	Carlisle United	
Replay	Carlisle United	1–3	Rochdale	
8	Swindon Town	2–3	Walsall	
9	Doncaster Rovers	3–3	Gainsborough Trinity	
Replay	Gainsborough Trinity	0–1	Doncaster Rovers	
10	Wrexham	2–1	Blyth Spartans	
11	Tranmere Rovers	0–1	Chester	
12	Wycombe Wanderers	4–2	Wisbech Town	
13	Accrington Stanley	1–2	Mansfield Town	
14	Barnsley	3–3	Bradford City	
Replay	Bradford City	2–1	Barnsley	
15	Brentford	5–0	Ashford Town (Kent)	
16	Crook Town	2–2	Matlock Town	
Replay	Matlock Town	0–1	Crook Town	
17	Coventry City	1–1	Southampton	
Replay	Southampton	5–1	Coventry City	
18	King's Lynn	3–1	Aldershot	
19	Rhyl	1–2	Grimsby Town	
20	Norwich City	1–1	Reading	
Replay	Reading	2–1	Norwich City	

Tie no	Home team	Score	Away team	Attendance
21	Shildon	1–1	Oldham Athletic	
Replay	Oldham Athletic	3–0	Shildon	
22	West Auckland Town	2–6	Stockport County	
23	Crystal Palace	5–1	Chelmsford City	
24	Southend United	6–0	Oswestry Town	
25	Bradford Park Avenue	6–1	Scarborough	
26	Exeter City	4–0	Barnstaple Town	
27	Bedford Town	0–4	Gillingham	
28	Newport County	4–2	Hereford United	10,391
29	Cheltenham Town	0–0	Watford	
Replay	Watford	3–0	Cheltenham Town	
30	Southport	2–2	Workington	
Replay	Workington	3–0	Southport	
31	Torquay United	7–1	Northampton Town	
32	Walthamstow Avenue	2–3	Bournemouth & Boscombe Athletic	
33	York City	3–1	Barrow	
34	Kettering Town	1–1	Margate	
Replay	Margate	3–2	Kettering Town	
35	Gateshead	3–4	Halifax Town	
36	Peterborough United	4–3	Shrewsbury Town	
37	South Shields	2–1	Chesterfield	
38	Colchester United	2–3	Queens Park Rangers	
39	Salisbury	1–0	Barnet	
40	Burscough	1–3	Crewe Alexandra	

== Second round proper ==
The matches were scheduled for Saturday, 5 December 1959, with three matches taking place later. Five matches were drawn, with replays taking place later the same week.

Tie no	Home team	Score	Away team	Date
1	Enfield	1–5	Bournemouth & Boscombe Athletic	5 December 1959
2	Bury	2–1	Oldham Athletic	5 December 1959
3	Rochdale	1–1	Bradford City	5 December 1959
Replay	Bradford City	2–1	Rochdale	9 December 1959
4	Southampton	3–0	Southend United	5 December 1959
5	Watford	5–1	Wycombe Wanderers	5 December 1959
6	Reading	4–2	King's Lynn	5 December 1959
7	Walsall	2–3	Peterborough United	5 December 1959
8	Gillingham	2–2	Torquay United	5 December 1959
Replay	Torquay United	1–2	Gillingham	9 December 1959
9	Notts County	0–1	Bath City	5 December 1959
10	Grimsby Town	2–3	Wrexham	5 December 1959
11	Doncaster Rovers	3–2	Darlington	5 December 1959
12	Stockport County	0–0	Crewe Alexandra	5 December 1959
Replay	Crewe Alexandra	2–0	Stockport County	9 December 1959
13	Queens Park Rangers	3–3	Port Vale	5 December 1959
Replay	Port Vale	2–1	Queens Park Rangers	7 December 1959
14	Crook Town	0–1	York City	5 December 1959
15	Exeter City	3–1	Brentford	5 December 1959
16	Mansfield Town	2–0	Chester	5 December 1959
17	Margate	0–0	Crystal Palace	5 December 1959
Replay	Crystal Palace	3–0	Margate	9 December 1959
18	Workington	1–0	Halifax Town	5 December 1959
19	South Shields	1–5	Bradford Park Avenue	5 December 1959
20	Salisbury	0–1	Newport County	5 December 1959

== Third round proper ==
The 44 First and Second Division clubs entered the competition at this stage. The matches were scheduled for Saturday, 9 January 1960. Eight matches were drawn and went to replays, with the Rotherham United–Arsenal match requiring a second replay. Watford's win over Birmingham City was the first in the Cup by a club from the new Fourth Division over First Division opponents.

Tie no	Home team	Score	Away team	Date
1	Blackpool	3–0	Mansfield Town	9 January 1960
2	Bournemouth & Boscombe Athletic	1–0	York City	9 January 1960
3	Bath City	0–1	Brighton & Hove Albion	9 January 1960
4	Bristol City	2–3	Charlton Athletic	9 January 1960
5	Bury	1–1	Bolton Wanderers	9 January 1960
Replay	Bolton Wanderers	4–2	Bury	13 January 1960
6	Liverpool	2–1	Leyton Orient	9 January 1960
7	Watford	2–1	Birmingham City	9 January 1960
8	Gillingham	1–4	Swansea Town	9 January 1960
9	Nottingham Forest	1–0	Reading	9 January 1960
10	Aston Villa	2–1	Leeds United	9 January 1960
11	Sheffield Wednesday	2–1	Middlesbrough	9 January 1960
12	Crewe Alexandra	2–0	Workington	9 January 1960
13	West Bromwich Albion	3–2	Plymouth Argyle	9 January 1960
14	Sunderland	1–1	Blackburn Rovers	9 January 1960
Replay	Blackburn Rovers	4–1	Sunderland	13 January 1960
15	Derby County	2–4	Manchester United	9 January 1960
16	Lincoln City	1–1	Burnley	9 January 1960
Replay	Burnley	2–0	Lincoln City	12 January 1960
17	Wrexham	1–2	Leicester City	9 January 1960
18	Sheffield United	3–0	Portsmouth	9 January 1960
19	Ipswich Town	2–3	Peterborough United	9 January 1960
20	Newcastle United	2–2	Wolverhampton Wanderers	9 January 1960
Replay	Wolverhampton Wanderers	4–2	Newcastle United	13 January 1960
21	Manchester City	1–5	Southampton	9 January 1960
22	Fulham	5–0	Hull City	9 January 1960
23	Bristol Rovers	0–0	Doncaster Rovers	9 January 1960
Replay	Doncaster Rovers	1–2	Bristol Rovers	12 January 1960
24	Bradford City	3–0	Everton	9 January 1960
25	Chelsea	5–1	Bradford Park Avenue	9 January 1960
26	Exeter City	1–2	Luton Town	9 January 1960
27	Scunthorpe United	1–0	Crystal Palace	9 January 1960
28	Huddersfield Town	1–1	West Ham United	9 January 1960
Replay	West Ham United	1–5	Huddersfield Town	13 January 1960
29	Cardiff City	0–2	Port Vale	9 January 1960
30	Newport County	0–4	Tottenham Hotspur	9 January 1960
31	Stoke City	1–1	Preston North End	9 January 1960
Replay	Preston North End	3–1	Stoke City	12 January 1960
32	Rotherham United	2–2	Arsenal	9 January 1960
Replay	Arsenal	1–1	Rotherham United	13 January 1960
Replay	Rotherham United	2–0	Arsenal	18 January 1960

== Fourth round proper ==
The matches were scheduled for Saturday, 30 January 1960. Six matches were drawn and went to replays, which were all played in the following midweek match. For the second round in a row, Rotherham United were taken to a second replay, this time by Brighton & Hove Albion. Peterborough United celebrated their final season in non-league football by reaching this stage and being the last team from the qualifying rounds left in the competition.

Tie no	Home team	Score	Away team	Date
1	Liverpool	1–3	Manchester United	30 January 1960
2	Southampton	2–2	Watford	30 January 1960
Replay	Watford	1–0	Southampton	2 February 1960
3	Leicester City	2–1	Fulham	30 January 1960
4	Blackburn Rovers	1–1	Blackpool	30 January 1960
Replay	Blackpool	0–3	Blackburn Rovers	3 February 1960
5	Sheffield Wednesday	2–0	Peterborough United	30 January 1960
6	Wolverhampton Wanderers	2–1	Charlton Athletic	30 January 1960
7	Crewe Alexandra	2–2	Tottenham Hotspur	30 January 1960
Replay	Tottenham Hotspur	13–2	Crewe Alexandra	3 February 1960
8	West Bromwich Albion	2–0	Bolton Wanderers	30 January 1960
9	Sheffield United	3–0	Nottingham Forest	30 January 1960
10	Bristol Rovers	3–3	Preston North End	30 January 1960
Replay	Preston North End	5–1	Bristol Rovers	2 February 1960
11	Bradford City	3–1	Bournemouth & Boscombe Athletic	30 January 1960
12	Chelsea	1–2	Aston Villa	30 January 1960
13	Scunthorpe United	0–1	Port Vale	30 January 1960
14	Huddersfield Town	0–1	Luton Town	30 January 1960
15	Swansea Town	0–0	Burnley	30 January 1960
Replay	Burnley	2–1	Swansea Town	2 February 1960
16	Rotherham United	1–1	Brighton & Hove Albion	30 January 1960
Replay	Brighton & Hove Albion	1–1	Rotherham United	3 February 1960
Replay	Rotherham United	0–6	Brighton & Hove Albion	8 February 1960

== Fifth round proper ==
The matches were scheduled for Saturday, 20 February 1960. One match went to a replay in the following mid-week fixture.

Tie no	Home team	Score	Away team	Date
1	Preston North End	2–1	Brighton & Hove Albion	20 February 1960
2	Leicester City	2–1	West Bromwich Albion	20 February 1960
3	Luton Town	1–4	Wolverhampton Wanderers	20 February 1960
4	Sheffield United	3–2	Watford	20 February 1960
5	Tottenham Hotspur	1–3	Blackburn Rovers	20 February 1960
6	Manchester United	0–1	Sheffield Wednesday	20 February 1960
7	Bradford City	2–2	Burnley	20 February 1960
Replay	Burnley	5–0	Bradford City	23 February 1960
8	Port Vale	1–2	Aston Villa	20 February 1960

== Sixth round proper ==
The draw for the semi-finals was made on Monday, 22 February 1960. All the original matches were played on Saturday, 12 March 1960.

12 March 1960
15:00 GMT

Burnley	3–3	Blackburn Rovers
Pilkington; Pointer; Connelly		Douglas (pen.); Dobing; McGrath

Turf Moor, Burnley
Attendance: 51,501
Referee: J.W. Hunt (Portsmouth)

Replay

16 March 1960
19:30 GMT

Blackburn Rovers	2–0 (a.e.t.)	Burnley
Dobling; MacLeod

Ewood Park, Blackburn
Referee: J.W. Hunt (Portsmouth)

12 March 1960
15:00 GMT

Leicester City	1–2	Wolverhampton Wanderers
McDonald		Broadbent; Chalmers (o.g.)

Filbert Street, Leicester
Attendance: 48,907
Referee: J.S. Pickles (Stockport)

12 March 1960
15:00 GMT

Aston Villa	2–0	Preston North End
Hitchens; McParland

Villa Park, Birmingham
Attendance: 69,732
Referee: K. Howley (Middlesbrough)

12 March 1960
15:00 GMT

Sheffield United	0–2	Sheffield Wednesday
		Wilkinson

Bramall Lane, Sheffield
Attendance: 61,180
Referee: J. Kelly (Chorley)

== Semi-finals ==
The draw for the semi-finals was made on Monday, 14 March 1960. Both matches were played on Saturday, 26 March 1960.

26 March 1960
15:00 GMT

Aston Villa	0–1	Wolverhampton Wanderers
		Deeley

The Hawthorns, West Bromwich
Attendance: 55,596
Referee: A. Jobling (Lancashire)

26 March 1960
15:00 GMT

Sheffield Wednesday	1–2	Blackburn Rovers
Fantham		Dougan

Maine Road, Manchester
Attendance: 74,135
Referee: J.G. Williams (Nottingham)

== Final ==
7 May 1960
15:00 BST

Blackburn Rovers	0–3	Wolverhampton Wanderers
		McGrath 41' (o.g.); Deeley 67', 88'

Wembley Stadium, London
Attendance: 98,954
Referee: Kevin Howley (Middlesbrough)
