= 1972–73 Birmingham City F.C. season =

Birmingham City F.C.
1972–73 season
- Chairman: Clifford Coombs
- Manager: Freddie Goodwin
- Ground: St Andrew's
- Football League First Division: 10th
- FA Cup: Third round (eliminated by Swindon Town)
- League Cup: Fourth round (eliminated by Blackpool)
- Top goalscorer: League: Bob Latchford (19); All: Bob Latchford (20)
- Highest home attendance: 51,278 vs Manchester United, 10 March 1973
- Lowest home attendance: 20,962 vs Luton Town, League Cup 2nd round, 5 September 1972
- Average home league attendance: 36,663
Home colours

The 1972–73 Football League season was Birmingham City Football Club's 70th season in the Football League and their 39th season in the First Division, to which they were promoted as Second Division runners-up in 1971–72. After spending much of the season in the lower reaches of the table, eight wins and a draw from the last ten matches brought them up to tenth position in the 22-team division. They entered the 1972–73 FA Cup in the third round proper and lost in that round to Swindon Town, and entered the League Cup in the second round, eliminated in the fourth by Blackpool.

Twenty-seven players made at least one appearance in nationally organised first-team competitions, and there were fourteen different goalscorers. Centre-forward Bob Latchford played in all but one of the 48 first-team matches over the season, and finished as the leading goalscorer with 20 goals, of which 19 came in league competition. The home attendance in First Division matches never fell below 30,000.

== Football League First Division ==
Date	League position	Opponents	Venue	Result	Score F–A	Scorers	Attendance
12 August 1972	15th	Sheffield United	H	L	1–2	R. Latchford	37,390
15 August 1972	9th	Newcastle United	H	W	3–2	McFaul og, Hope, R. Latchford	35,831
19 August 1972	13th	Ipswich Town	A	L	0–2		17,775
23 August 1972	19th	Tottenham Hotspur	A	L	0–2		30,798
26 August 1972	18th	Crystal Palace	H	D	1–1	Francis	31,066
30 August 1972	16th	West Bromwich Albion	A	D	2–2	Hatton, R. Latchford	37,108
2 September 1972	19th	Wolverhampton Wanderers	A	L	2–3	Hope, Burns	32,539
9 September 1972	15th	Manchester City	H	W	4–1	R. Latchford 3, Campbell	32,983
16 September 1972	18th	Derby County	A	L	0–1		33,753
23 September 1972	15th	Everton	H	W	2–1	R. Latchford, Francis	37,133
26 September 1972	15th	Arsenal	A	L	0–2		30,003
30 September 1972	16th	West Ham United	A	L	0–2		26,482
7 October 1972	17th	Chelsea	H	D	2–2	Hope, R. Latchford	38,756
14 October 1972	19th	Manchester United	A	L	0–1		52,104
21 October 1972	18th	Southampton	H	D	1–1	Roberts	30,757
28 October 1972	19th	Coventry City	A	D	0–0		35,304
4 November 1972	19th	Tottenham Hotspur	H	D	0–0		38,504
11 November 1972	21st	Newcastle United	A	L	0–3		26,042
18 November 1972	17th	Stoke City	A	W	2–1	R. Latchford 2	23,040
25 November 1972	16th	Norwich City	H	W	4–1	Pendrey, Hope, Want, Hatton	32,890
2 December 1972	16th	Liverpool	A	L	3–4	Taylor, Hope, R. Latchford	45,407
9 December 1972	16th	Leicester City	H	D	1–1	Calderwood	32,481
16 December 1972	17th	Leeds United	A	L	0–4		25,275
23 December 1972	19th	Arsenal	H	D	1–1	Bowker	32,721
26 December 1972	18th	Everton	A	D	1–1	R. Latchford	39,363
30 December 1972	19th	Ipswich Town	H	L	1–2	Hatton	32,705
27 January 1973	21st	Manchester City	A	L	0–1		31,877
10 February 1973	20th	Derby County	H	W	2–0	R. Latchford, Francis	38,096
17 February 1973	18th	Sheffield United	A	W	1–0	Francis	22,220
27 February 1973	19th	Wolverhampton Wanderers	H	L	0–1		43,759
3 March 1973	18th	Chelsea	A	D	0–0		26,259
6 March 1973	16th	Crystal Palace	A	D	0–0		26,014
10 March 1973	15th	Manchester United	H	W	3–1	R. Latchford, Hatton, Campbell pen	51,278
17 March 1973	17th	Southampton	A	L	0–2		14,612
24 March 1973	17th	Coventry City	H	W	3–0	Hatton, R. Latchford, Taylor	34,775
31 March 1973	15th	Norwich City	A	W	2–1	R. Latchford 2	23,899
7 April 1973	16th	Liverpool	H	W	2–1	R. Latchford, Hatton	48,114
14 April 1973	12th	Leicester City	A	W	1–0	Campbell	27,652
21 April 1973	11th	Stoke City	H	W	3–1	Page, Francis, Hatton	32,513
23 April 1973	11th	West Ham United	H	D	0–0		36,942
28 April 1973	11th	West Bromwich Albion	H	W	3–2	R. Latchford, Hynd, Burns	36,784
30 April 1973	10th	Leeds United	H	W	2–1	Francis, Burns	34,449

=== League table (part) ===
Final First Division table (part)
Pos	Club	Pld	W	D	L	F	A	GA	Pts
8th	Tottenham Hotspur	42	16	13	13	58	48	1.21	45
9th	Newcastle United	42	16	13	13	60	51	1.18	45
10th	Birmingham City	42	15	12	15	53	54	0.98	42
11th	Manchester City	42	15	11	16	57	60	0.95	41
12th	Chelsea	42	13	14	15	49	51	0.96	40
Key	Pos = League position; Pld = Matches played; W = Matches won; D = Matches drawn; L = Matches lost; F = Goals for; A = Goals against; GA = Goal average; Pts = Points								

== FA Cup ==
Round	Date	Opponents	Venue	Result	Score F–A	Scorers	Attendance
Third round	13 January 1973	Swindon Town	A	L	0–2		17,373

== League Cup ==
Round	Date	Opponents	Venue	Result	Score F–A	Scorers	Attendance
Second round	5 September 1972	Luton Town	H	D	1–1	R. Latchford	20,962
Second round replay	13 September 1972	Luton Town	A	D	1–1	Campbell	13,806
Second round 2nd replay	19 September 1972	Luton Town	County Ground, Northampton	W	1–0	Francis	11,451
Third round	3 October 1972	Coventry City	H	W	2–1	Francis, Barry og	27,803
Fourth round	31 October 1972	Blackpool	A	L	0–2		13,332

== Appearances and goals ==
Numbers in parentheses denote appearances made as a substitute.
Key to positions: GK – Goalkeeper; DF – Defender; MF – Midfielder; FW – Forward

Players' appearances and goals by competition
Pos.	Nat.	Name	League		FA Cup		League Cup		Total	
Pos.	Nat.	Name	Apps	Goals	Apps	Goals	Apps	Goals	Apps	Goals
GK	ENG	Paul Cooper	3	0	0	0	1	0	4	0
GK	ENG	Mike Kelly	7	0	0	0	0	0	7	0
GK	ENG	Dave Latchford	32	0	1	0	4	0	37	0
DF	ENG	Keith Bowker	5	1	0	0	0	0	5	1
DF	IRL	Tommy Carroll	11	0	0	0	3	0	14	0
DF	ENG	Stan Harland	18	1	1	0	3	0	22	0
DF	ENG	Dave Howitt	2	0	0	0	1	0	3	0
DF	SCO	Roger Hynd	40	1	1	0	4	0	45	1
DF	ENG	Ray Martin	23	0	0	0	1	0	24	0
DF	ENG	Garry Pendrey	39 (1)	1	1	0	5	0	45 (1)	1
DF	WAL	John Roberts	21	1	0	0	0	0	21	1
DF	ENG	Dave Robinson	0	0	0	0	1	0	1	0
DF	ENG	Tony Want	20	1	1	0	2	0	23	1
DF	ENG	Alan Whitehead	1	0	0	0	0	0	1	0
MF	SCO	Kenny Burns	9 (5)	3	0	0	3 (2)	0	12 (7)	3
MF	SCO	Jimmy Calderwood	5	1	0	0	0	0	5	1
MF	SCO	Alan Campbell	29 (3)	3	0	0	4	1	33 (3)	4
MF	SCO	Paul Hendrie	0 (1)	0	0	0	0	0	0 (1)	0
MF	SCO	Bobby Hope	24 (1)	5	1	0	4	0	29 (1)	5
MF	WAL	Malcolm Page	26 (1)	1	1	0	3	0	30 (1)	1
MF	ENG	George Smith	5	0	0	0	1	0	6	0
MF	ENG	Gordon Taylor	34 (2)	2	1	0	2 (1)	0	37 (3)	2
FW	ENG	Trevor Francis	31	6	1	0	5	2	37	8
FW	ENG	Bob Hatton	31 (1)	7	0 (1)	0	3	0	34 (2)	7
FW	ENG	Bob Latchford	42	19	1	0	5	1	47	20
FW	ENG	Steve Phillips	3	0	0	0	0	0	3	0
FW	ENG	Phil Summerill	1 (1)	0	0	0	1	0	2 (1)	0

== See also ==
- Birmingham City F.C. seasons
