= 1970–71 Birmingham City F.C. season =

Birmingham City F.C.
1970–71 season
- Chairman: Clifford Coombs
- Manager: Freddie Goodwin
- Ground: St Andrew's
- Football League Second Division: 9th
- FA Cup: Third round (eliminated by Huddersfield Town)
- Football League Cup: Fourth round (eliminated by Bristol Rovers)
- Top goalscorer: League: Phil Summerill (16); All: Phil Summerill (21)
- Highest home attendance: 49,025 vs Cardiff City, 27 March 1971
- Lowest home attendance: 13,630 vs Norwich City, 28 November 1970
- Average home league attendance: 24,164
Home colours

The 1970–71 Football League season was Birmingham City Football Club's 68th in the Football League, their 30th in the Second Division, and their first with Freddie Goodwin as manager. They finished in 9th position in the 22-team division. They entered the 1970–71 FA Cup in the third round proper and lost in that round after a replay to Huddersfield Town, and progressed from the first round of the League Cup to the fourth, where they were eliminated by Bristol Rovers.

Twenty-six players made at least one appearance in nationally organised first-team competition, and there were twelve different goalscorers. Defender Roger Hynd played in 48 of the 50 first-team matches over the season, and Phil Summerill was leading goalscorer for the third consecutive season.

In March 1971, Geoff Vowden dropped a division to join Aston Villa for a fee of £12,500.

== Football League Second Division ==
Date	League position	Opponents	Venue	Result	Score F–A	Scorers	Attendance
15 August 1970	4th	Queens Park Rangers	H	W	2–1	Summerill, Vowden	30,785
22 August 1970	1st	Carlisle United	A	W	3–0	Vincent, R. Latchford 2	9,244
29 August 1970	1st	Luton Town	H	D	1–1	Vowden	30,141
1 September 1970	1st	Middlesbrough	H	L	0–1		27,769
5 September 1970	10th	Cardiff City	A	L	0–2		22,081
12 September 1970	11th	Oxford United	H	D	1–1	Francis	22,346
19 September 1970	15th	Portsmouth	A	L	0–1		18,037
26 September 1970	16th	Charlton Athletic	H	D	1–1	Summerill	20,767
29 September 1970	17th	Bristol City	A	L	1–2	Summerill	15,975
3 October 1970	15th	Hull City	A	W	1–0	R. Latchford	17,882
10 October 1970	16th	Sheffield United	H	L	0–1		22,350
17 October 1970	19th	Queens Park Rangers	A	L	2–5	R. Latchford 2	13,074
20 October 1970	19th	Leicester City	H	D	0–0		25,381
24 October 1970	19th	Watford	A	L	1–2	Vowden	14,707
31 October 1970	18th	Swindon Town	H	W	2–1	Vincent, Robinson	18,502
7 November 1970	19th	Sunderland	A	L	1–2	Summerill	15,994
14 November 1970	16th	Orient	H	W	1–0	Page	14,137
21 November 1970	18th	Bolton Wanderers	A	L	0–3		7,141
28 November 1970	18th	Norwich City	H	D	2–2	Vincent, Summerill	13,630
5 December 1970	18th	Millwall	A	L	1–2	Summerill	8,489
12 December 1970	16th	Sheffield Wednesday	H	W	1–0	R. Latchford	14,239
19 December 1970	15th	Carlisle United	H	W	1–0	Francis	15,670
26 December 1970	15th	Blackburn Rovers	A	D	2–2	Bowker, Francis	8,787
9 January 1970	14th	Bristol City	H	W	2–0	Taylor, R. Latchford	15,292
16 January 1971	14th	Leicester City	A	W	4–1	R. Latchford 2, Bowker, Summerill	25,657
30 January 1971	14th	Norwich City	A	D	2–2	Summerill 2	11,964
6 February 1970	12th	Millwall	H	W	3–1	Page, Summerill pen, Francis	21,893
13 February 1971	11th	Sheffield Wednesday	A	D	3–3	Francis 2, R. Latchford	13,138
20 February 1971	10th	Bolton Wanderers	H	W	4–0	Francis 4	25,600
27 February 1971	9th	Swindon Town	A	W	2–1	Francis 2	19,860
6 March 1971	8th	Watford	H	W	2–0	Summerill, Francis	27,605
13 March 1971	8th	Orient	A	W	2–0	Francis, Summerill	11,167
20 March 1971	8th	Sunderland	H	W	3–1	Summerill 2 (1 pen), Page	34,194
27 March 1971	8th	Cardiff City	H	W	2–0	Francis, Summerill	49,025
3 April 1971	9th	Luton Town	A	L	2–3	R. Latchford, Summerill	25,172
9 April 1971	9th	Oxford United	A	L	0–1		16,196
10 April 1971	9th	Blackburn Rovers	H	W	1–0	Campbell	25,572
13 April 1971	9th	Hull City	H	D	0–0		33,109
17 April 1971	10th	Sheffield United	A	L	0–3		29,364
24 April 1971	9th	Portsmouth	H	D	1–1	R. Latchford	19,440
27 April 1971	9th	Middlesbrough	A	D	0–0		12,802
1 May 1971	9th	Charlton Athletic	A	D	1–1	R. Latchford	10,723

=== League table (part) ===
Final Second Division table (part)
Pos	Club	Pld	W	D	L	F	A	GA	Pts
7th	Middlesbrough	42	17	14	11	60	43	1.40	48
8th	Millwall	42	19	9	14	59	42	1.41	47
9th	Birmingham City	42	17	12	13	58	48	1.21	46
10th	Norwich City	42	15	14	13	44	52	1.04	44
11th	Queens Park Rangers	42	16	11	15	58	53	1.09	43
Key	Pos = League position; Pld = Matches played; W = Matches won; D = Matches drawn; L = Matches lost; F = Goals for; A = Goals against; GA = Goal average; Pts = Points								

== FA Cup ==
Round	Date	Opponents	Venue	Result	Score F–A	Scorers	Attendance
Third round	2 January 1971	Huddersfield Town	A	D	1–1	Summerill pen	26,486
Third round replay	5 January 1971	Huddersfield Town	H	L	0–2		26,558

== League Cup ==
Round	Date	Opponents	Venue	Result	Score F–A	Scorers	Attendance
First round	18 August 1970	Wrexham	H	D	3–3	Murray, Vowden, Vincent	21,623
First round replay	26 August 1970	Wrexham	A	W	3–2	Vowden, Vincent, Hockey	17,019
Second round	9 September 1970	Colchester United	A	D	1–1	Summerill	8,085
Second round replay	15 September 1970	Colchester United	H	W	2–1	Vowden, Summerill	17,606
Third round	4 October 1970	Nottingham Forest	H	W	2–1	Summerill 2	23,015
Fourth round	26 October 1970	Bristol Rovers	A	L	0–3		21,426

== Appearances and goals ==
Numbers in parentheses denote appearances made as a substitute.
Players marked † left the club during the playing season.
Key to positions: GK – Goalkeeper; DF – Defender; MF – Midfielder; FW – Forward

Players' appearances and goals by competition
Pos.	Nat.	Name	League		FA Cup		League Cup		Total	
Pos.	Nat.	Name	Apps	Goals	Apps	Goals	Apps	Goals	Apps	Goals
GK	ENG	Mike Kelly	34	0	1	0	6	0	41	0
GK	ENG	Dave Latchford	8	0	1	0	0	0	9	0
DF	WAL	Colin Green	2	0	0	0	1	0	3	0
DF	ENG	Mike Harrison	2	0	0	0	0	0	2	0
DF	SCO	Roger Hynd	40	0	2	0	6	0	48	0
DF	ENG	Ray Martin	36	0	2	0	4	0	42	0
DF	ENG	Garry Pendrey	24 (4)	0	0	0	4	0	28 (4)	0
DF	ENG	Dave Robinson	38	1	2	0	5	0	45	1
DF	ENG	John Sleeuwenhoek	1	0	0	0	0 (1)	0	1 (1)	0
DF	ENG	Bobby Thomson	11	0	0	0	4	0	15	0
MF	ENG	Malcolm Beard	7 (1)	0	0	0	1	0	8 (1)	0
MF	SCO	Alan Campbell	29	1	2	0	0	0	31	1
MF	WAL	Trevor Hockey †	24	0	2	0	6	1	32	1
MF	ENG	Bert Murray †	8	0	0 (1)	0	3	1	11 (1)	1
MF	WAL	Malcolm Page	27 (1)	3	2	0	2	0	31 (1)	3
MF	ENG	George Smith	9	0	0	0	0	0	9	0
MF	ENG	Gordon Taylor	21	1	2	0	0	0	23	1
FW	ENG	Keith Bowker	8 (2)	2	1	0	0 (1)	0	9 (3)	2
FW	ENG	Mick Darrell	0	0	0	0	1	0	1	0
FW	ENG	Trevor Francis	21 (1)	15	2	0	2	0	25 (1)	15
FW	ENG	Tony Hateley †	2	0	0	0	0 (1)	0	2 (1)	0
FW	SCO	George Johnston †	0	0	0	0	1	0	1	0
FW	ENG	Bob Latchford	35 (1)	13	2	0	4	0	41 (1)	13
FW	ENG	Phil Summerill	38 (1)	16	1 (1)	1	5	4	44 (2)	21
FW	ENG	Johnny Vincent †	16 (1)	3	0	0	5	2	21 (1)	5
FW	ENG	Geoff Vowden †	16 (1)	3	0	0	6	3	22 (1)	6

== See also ==
- Birmingham City F.C. seasons
