= 1971–72 Birmingham City F.C. season =

Birmingham City F.C.
1971–72 season
- Chairman: Clifford Coombs
- Manager: Freddie Goodwin
- Ground: St Andrew's
- Football League Second Division: 2nd (promoted)
- FA Cup: Third place (eliminated by Leeds United)
- League Cup: Second round (eliminated by Queens Park Rangers)
- Anglo-Italian Cup: 4th, English group
- Top goalscorer: League: Bob Latchford (23); All: Bob Latchford (30)
- Highest home attendance: 52,470 vs Huddersfield Town, FA Cup 6th round, 18 March 1972
- Lowest home attendance: 22,410 vs Portsmouth, 8 January 1972
- Average home league attendance: 32,337
Home colours

The 1971–72 Football League season was Birmingham City Football Club's 69th in the Football League and their 31st in the Second Division. They finished in second place in the 22-team division, so were promoted to the First Division for 1972–73, despite never having been in the promotion positions until after the final game of the season.

They entered the 1971–72 FA Cup in the third round proper and progressed to the semi-final, in which they lost to Leeds United. This was the third year of five in which the losing semifinalists were required to compete in a "match for third place"; following a goalless 90 minutes, Birmingham beat Stoke City in a penalty shootout, the first time this method had been used to determine the result of an FA Cup match. They lost to Queens Park Rangers in their opening match in the second round of the League Cup, and finished fourth of the six English entrants in the third staging of the Anglo-Italian Cup, a tournament held after the end of the league season.

Twenty-five players made at least one appearance in nationally organised first-team competition, and there were ten different goalscorers. Defender Roger Hynd, midfielder Alan Campbell and centre-forward Bob Latchford played in all 53 first-team matches over the season. Latchford finished as leading goalscorer with 30 goals, of which 23 came in league competition. The average attendance in Second Division matches exceeded 32,000.

== Football League Second Division ==
Date	League position	Opponents	Venue	Result	Score F–A	Scorers	Attendance
14 August 1971	8th	Sunderland	A	D	1–1	Bowker	9,749
21 August 1971	6th	Carlisle United	H	W	3–2	Summerill, Bowker, Campbell	26,254
28 August 1971	12th	Portsmouth	A	L	0–1		14,729
1 September 1971	17th	Hull City	A	L	0–1		16,746
4 September 1971	10th	Charlton Athletic	H	W	4–1	Francis, R. Latchford 3	25,231
11 September 1971	12th	Luton Town	A	D	0–0		14,678
18 September 1971	9th	Bristol City	H	W	1–0	R. Latchford	28,745
25 September 1971	9th	Blackpool	A	D	1–1	Francis	22,610
28 September 1971	5th	Watford	H	W	4–1	R. Latchford 3, Francis	28,095
2 October 1971	5th	Oxford United	H	D	0–0		31,759
9 October 1971	8th	Queens Park Rangers	A	L	0–1		16,039
16 October 1971	8th	Sunderland	H	D	1–1	R. Latchford	27,341
19 October 1971	8th	Swindon Town	A	D	1–1	R. Latchford	14,269
23 October 1971	8th	Preston North End	H	D	2–2	R. Latchford, Francis	28,956
30 October 1971	8th	Burnley	A	D	1–1	R. Latchford	17,170
6 November 1971	7th	Orient	H	W	2–0	Hatton, R. Latchford	27,349
13 November 1971	6th	Norwich City	A	D	2–2	Campbell pen, R. Latchford	24,094
20 November 1971	8th	Millwall	A	L	0–3		15,724
27 November 1971	7th	Fulham	H	W	3–1	R. Latchford, Hatton 2	25,545
4 December 1971	6th	Middlesbrough	A	D	0–0		15,761
11 December 1971	7th	Sheffield Wednesday	H	D	0–0		29,272
18 December 1971	7th	Charlton Athletic	A	D	1–1	Hatton	8,313
27 December 1971	5th	Cardiff City	H	W	3–0	Pendrey, Hatton, Francis	40,793
1 January 1971	6th	Bristol City	A	L	0–1		17,457
8 January 1972	5th	Portsmouth	H	W	6–3	Hatton 2, R. Latchford 2, Campbell pen, Francis	22,410
22 January 1972	4th	Watford	A	W	1–0	Francis	10,884
29 January 1972	4th	Swindon Town	H	W	4–1	Francis, R. Latchford 2, Hatton	27,824
12 February 1972	4th	Preston North End	A	D	0–0		17,794
19 February 1972	4th	Burnley	H	W	2–0	Taylor, Hatton	32,035
4 March 1972	4th	Norwich City	H	W	4–0	Hatton 2, R. Latchford, Hynd	40,899
11 March 1972	4th	Queens Park Rangers	H	D	0–0		35,557
21 March 1972	3rd	Carlisle United	A	D	2–2	Hatton, R. Latchford	12,279
25 March 1972	3rd	Luton Town	H	W	1–0	Hatton	34,539
31 March 1972	3rd	Oxford United	A	W	1–0	Hatton	18,990
1 April 1972	3rd	Cardiff City	A	D	0–0		23,667
4 April 1972	3rd	Blackpool	H	W	2–1	R. Latchford, Francis	45,181
8 April 1972	3rd	Millwall	H	W	1–0	R. Latchford	43,483
18 April 1972	3rd	Fulham	A	D	0–0		16,553
22 April 1972	3rd	Middlesbrough	H	D	1–1	Francis	37,202
25 April 1972	3rd	Hull City	H	W	2–0	Campbell pen, Francis	40,749
29 April 1972	3rd	Sheffield Wednesday	A	W	2–1	Hatton, Francis	27,991
2 May 1972	2nd	Orient	A	W	1–0	R. Latchford	33,383

=== League table (part) ===
Final Second Division table (part)
Pos	Club	Pld	W	D	L	F	A	GA	Pts
1st	Norwich City	42	21	15	6	60	36	1.67	57
2nd	Birmingham City	42	19	18	5	60	31	1.94	56
3rd	Millwall	42	19	17	6	64	46	1.39	55
4th	Queens Park Rangers	42	20	14	8	58	28	2.04	54
5th	Sunderland	42	17	16	9	67	57	1.18	50
Key	Pos = League position; Pld = Matches played; W = Matches won; D = Matches drawn; L = Matches lost; F = Goals for; A = Goals against; GA = Goal average; Pts = Points								

== FA Cup ==
Round	Date	Opponents	Venue	Result	Score F–A	Scorers	Attendance
Third round	15 January 1972	Port Vale	H	W	3–0	Hynd, Francis 2	32,937
Fourth round	5 February 1972	Ipswich Town	H	W	1–0	R. Latchford	40,709
Fifth round	26 February 1972	Portsmouth	H	W	3–1	Hatton, R. Latchford 2	43,886
Sixth round	18 March 1972	Huddersfield Town	H	W	3–1	Page, R. Latchford, Hatton	52,470
Semi-final	15 April 1972	Leeds United	Hillsborough, Sheffield	L	0–3		54,723
3rd/4th place playoff	5 August 1972	Stoke City	H	W	0–0; 4–3 pens	Campbell, Francis, Hope, Harland	23,841

== League Cup ==
Round	Date	Opponents	Venue	Result	Score F–A	Scorers	Attendance
Second round	7 September 1971	Queens Park Rangers	A	L	0–1		15,032

== Anglo-Italian Cup ==
Date	Opponents	Venue	Result	Score F–A	Scorers	Attendance
1 June 1972	Lanerossi Vicenza	A	D	0–0		3,000
4 June 1972	Sampdoria	A	L	1–2	Campbell pen	15,000
7 June 1972	Lanerossi Vicenza	H	W	5–3	R. Latchford 2, Francis, Hatton, Taylor	23,642
10 June 1972	Sampdoria	H	W	2–0	R. Latchford, Hatton	19,510

Clubs were classified according to total points (2 for a win, 1 for a draw) added to goals scored. The top club of each national section qualified for the final.

English section
Pos	Club	Pld	W	D	L	F	A	Pts	Total
3rd	Leicester City	4	2	0	2	11	7	4	15
4th	Birmingham City	4	2	1	1	8	5	5	13
5th	Sunderland	4	1	2	1	8	7	4	12
Key	Pos = Position; Pld = Matches played W = Matches won; D = Matches drawn; L = Matches lost F = Goals for; A = Goals against Pts = Points; Total = Sum of points and goals scored								

== Appearances and goals ==
Numbers in parentheses denote appearances made as a substitute.
Players with name in italics and marked * were on loan from another club for the whole of their season with Birmingham.
Key to positions: GK – Goalkeeper; DF – Defender; MF – Midfielder; FW – Forward

Players' appearances and goals by competition
Pos.	Nat.	Name	League		FA Cup		League Cup		Anglo-Italian Cup		Total	
Pos.	Nat.	Name	Apps	Goals	Apps	Goals	Apps	Goals	Apps	Goals	Apps	Goals
GK	ENG	Paul Cooper	12	0	4	0	0	0	3	0	19	0
GK	ENG	Mike Kelly	19	0	0	0	0	0	1 (1)	0	20 (1)	0
GK	ENG	Dave Latchford	11	0	2	0	1	0	0	0	14	0
DF	SCO	Kenny Burns	7 (1)	0	0	0	0	0	0	0	7 (1)	0
DF	IRL	Tommy Carroll	27	0	6	0	0	0	0	0	33	0
DF	ENG	Stan Harland	19	0	6	0	0	0	4	0	29	0
DF	ENG	Mike Harrison	1	0	0	0	0	0	0	0	1	0
DF	SCO	Roger Hynd	42	1	6	1	1	0	4	0	53	2
DF	ENG	Ray Martin	14 (1)	0	0	0	1	0	0	0	15 (1)	0
DF	ENG	Garry Pendrey	40	1	5	0	1	0	2 (1)	0	48 (1)	1
DF	ENG	Dave Robinson	10 (2)	0	0	0	0	0	0	0	10 (2)	0
DF	ENG	Tony Want	0	0	1	0	0	0	4	0	5	0
DF	ENG	Alan Whitehead	3	0	0	0	0	0	0 (1)	0	3 (1)	0
MF	SCO	Alan Campbell	42	4	6	0	1	0	4	1	53	5
MF	SCO	Bobby Hope	0	0	1	0	0	0	4	0	5	0
MF	ENG	Mike O'Grady *	2 (1)	0	0	0	0	0	0	0	2 (1)	0
MF	WAL	Malcolm Page	38 (1)	0	5	1	1	0	4	0	48 (1)	1
MF	ENG	George Smith	22 (3)	0	1 (1)	0	1	0	2	0	26 (4)	0
MF	ENG	Gordon Taylor	27 (3)	1	5 (1)	0	1	0	4	1	37 (4)	2
FW	ENG	Keith Bowker	6	2	0	0	0	0	0	0	6	2
FW	ENG	Trevor Francis	39	12	6	2	1	0	2	1	48	15
FW	ENG	Bob Hatton	26	15	6	2	0	0	4	2	36	19
FW	ENG	Bob Latchford	42	23	6	4	1	0	4	3	53	30
FW	ENG	Steve Phillips	6 (1)	0	0	0	0	0	0	0	6 (1)	0
FW	ENG	Phil Summerill	7 (2)	1	0	0	1	0	0 (1)	0	7 (3)	1

== See also ==
- Birmingham City F.C. seasons
