= 1973–74 Birmingham City F.C. season =

Birmingham City F.C.
1973–74 season
- Chairman: Clifford Coombs
- Manager: Freddie Goodwin
- Ground: St Andrew's
- Football League First Division: 19th
- FA Cup: Fourth round (eliminated by Queens Park Rangers)
- League Cup: Fifth round (eliminated by Plymouth Argyle)
- Texaco Cup: Second round (eliminated by Newcastle United)
- Top goalscorer: League: Bob Hatton (14); All: Bob Hatton (20)
- Highest home attendance: 50,451 vs Leeds United, 29 December 1973
- Lowest home attendance: 12,422 vs Newcastle United, Texaco Cup 2nd round, 22 October 1973
- Average home league attendance: 33,048
Home colours

The 1973–74 Football League season was Birmingham City Football Club's 71st in the Football League and their 40th in the First Division. After spending most of the season in the relegation positions, they finished in 19th place in the 22-team division, avoiding relegation by just one point. They entered the 1973–74 FA Cup at the third round proper and lost to Queens Park Rangers in the fourth, and were eliminated from the League Cup in the fifth round by Plymouth Argyle. They lost in the second round of the Texaco Cup on aggregate, after the first attempt to play the second leg of their match against Newcastle United had to be abandoned after 100 minutes when it became too dark to play.

Thirty players made at least one appearance in nationally organised first-team competition, and there were twelve different goalscorers. Forward Bob Hatton played in 51 of the 54 first-team matches over the season, and the leading goalscorer was Hatton with 20 goals, of which 14 came in league competition.

In February 1974, by which time he had already scored 18 goals for Birmingham, centre-forward Bob Latchford signed for Everton in part-exchange for Howard Kendall, Archie Styles, and £80,000. The whole package was valued at a British record transfer fee of £350,000.

== Football League First Division ==
Date	League position	Opponents	Venue	Result	Score F–A	Scorers	Attendance
25 August 1973	15th	Manchester City	A	L	1–3	Hatton	35,881
28 August 1973	17th	Tottenham Hotspur	H	L	1–2	Hatton	37,754
1 September 1973	20th	Derby County	H	D	0–0		34,899
5 September 1973	22nd	Chelsea	A	L	1–3	Page	25,660
8 September 1973	22nd	Leeds United	A	L	0–3		39,746
11 September 1973	22nd	Chelsea	H	L	2–4	Hatton, Taylor	30,252
15 September 1973	22nd	Liverpool	H	D	1–1	R. Latchford	35,719
22 September 1973	22nd	Queens Park Rangers	A	D	2–2	R. Latchford, Burns	18,701
29 September 1973	22nd	Ipswich Town	H	L	0–3		26,919
6 October 1973	22nd	Arsenal	A	L	0–1		23,915
13 October 1973	21st	Wolverhampton Wanderers	H	W	2–1	Francis pen, Burns	34,977
20 October 1973	22nd	Manchester United	A	L	0–1		48,937
27 October 1973	22nd	Everton	H	L	0–2		31,181
3 November 1973	22nd	Sheffield United	A	D	1–1	Hynd	19,339
10 November 1973	22nd	Southampton	H	D	1–1	Hatton	25,297
17 November 1973	22nd	Stoke City	A	L	2–5	Hynd, R. Latchford	19,179
24 November 1973	22nd	Leicester City	H	W	3–0	R. Latchford 3	27,719
8 December 1973	21st	Newcastle United	H	W	1–0	Burns	25,428
15 December 1973	20th	West Ham United	H	W	3–1	Burns 2, Hatton	23,767
22 December 1973	20th	Ipswich Town	A	L	0–3		15,457
26 December 1973	19th	Coventry City	H	W	1–0	R. Latchford	33,423
29 December 1973	20th	Leeds United	H	D	1–1	R. Latchford	50,451
1 January 1973	19th	Derby County	A	D	1–1	Hatton	31,189
12 January 1974	20th	Liverpool	A	L	2–3	R. Latchford	39,094
19 January 1974	20th	Manchester City	H	D	1–1	R. Latchford	31,401
2 February 1974	20th	West Ham United	A	D	0–0		27,948
6 February 1974	20th	Tottenham Hotspur	A	L	2–4	England og, Phillips	14,345
16 February 1974	20th	Wolverhampton Wanderers	A	L	0–1		33,821
23 February 1974	20th	Arsenal	H	W	3–1	Gallagher, Hatton, Francis	29,828
2 March 1974	20th	Coventry City	A	W	1–0	Hatton	27,863
9 March 1974	20th	Everton	A	L	1–4	Hatton	33,944
16 March 1974	20th	Manchester United	H	W	1–0	Gallagher	37,768
20 March 1974	20th	Norwich City	A	L	1–2	Styles	18,309
23 March 1974	20th	Southampton	A	W	2–0	Burns, Francis	23,349
30 March 1974	20th	Sheffield United	H	W	1–0	Hatton	27,877
6 April 1974	20th	Leicester City	A	D	3–3	Burns 3	28,486
12 April 1974	20th	Burnley	A	L	1–2	Campbell	17,038
13 April 1974	20th	Stoke City	H	D	0–0		29,467
16 April 1974	20th	Burnley	H	D	2–2	Hatton 2	36,548
20 April 1974	20th	Newcastle United	A	D	1–1	Francis	34,066
23 April 1974	19th	Queens Park Rangers	H	W	4–0	Taylor, Francis 2, Kendall	39,160
27 April 1974	19th	Norwich City	H	W	2–1	Hatton, Burns	44,182

=== League table (part) ===
Final First Division table (part)
Pos	Club	Pld	W	D	L	F	A	GA	Pts
17th	Chelsea	42	12	13	17	56	60	0.93	37
18th	West Ham United	42	11	15	16	55	60	0.92	37
19th	Birmingham City	42	12	13	17	52	64	0.81	37
20th	Southampton	42	11	14	17	47	68	0.69	36
21st	Manchester United	42	10	12	20	38	48	0.79	32
Key	Pos = League position; Pld = Matches played; W = Matches won; D = Matches drawn; L = Matches lost; F = Goals for; A = Goals against; GA = Goal average; Pts = Points								

== FA Cup ==
Round	Date	Opponents	Venue	Result	Score F–A	Scorers	Attendance
Third round	5 January 1974	Cardiff City	H	W	5–2	Francis 3', R. Latchford (2) 36', 66;, Hatton (2) 76', 88'	22,435
Fourth round	26 January 1974	Queens Park Rangers	A	L	0–2		23,367

== League Cup ==
Round	Date	Opponents	Venue	Result	Score F–A	Scorers	Attendance
Second round	9 October 1973	Blackpool	A	D	1–1	Burns	7,943
Second round replay	16 October 1973	Blackpool	H	W	4–2	Burns, Hatton 3	16,880
Third round	30 October 1973	Newcastle United	H	D	2–2	R. Latchford (2) 18', 50'	13,025
Third round replay	7 November 1973	Newcastle United	A	W	1–0 aet	Francis (pen) 99'	19,276
Fourth round	21 November 1973	Ipswich Town	A	W	3–1	R. Latchford 3	12,241
Fifth round	19 December 1973	Plymouth Argyle	H	L	1–2	Hatton 9'	15,273

== Texaco Cup ==
The home leg of the quarter-final match against Newcastle United finished as a 1–1 draw. Despite the ban on use of floodlights because of the fuel crisis, the League refused to allow an earlier kickoff time for the away leg on 28 November 1973. The match was abandoned at 1–1 after 10 minutes of extra time in almost total darkness. Keith Bowker scored Birmingham's goal, in his only appearance of the season and last outing for the club; neither appearance nor goal count towards his statistics. When the match was replayed, Birmingham lost 3–1 after Newcastle's Jimmy Smith was sent off in the first two minutes for a tackle that broke both bones in Tony Want's lower leg.

Round	Date	Opponents	Venue	Result	Score F–A	Scorers	Attendance
First round 1st leg	19 September 1973	Stoke City	A	D	0–0		9,530
First round 2nd leg	2 October 1973	Stoke City	H	D	0–0 aet 3–1 pens		13,433
Second round 1st leg	22 October 1973	Newcastle United	H	D	1–1	R. Latchford	12,422
Second round 2nd leg	5 December 1973	Newcastle United	A	L	1–3	Francis	9,762

== Appearances and goals ==
Numbers in parentheses denote appearances made as a substitute.
Players marked † left the club during the playing season.
Key to positions: GK – Goalkeeper; DF – Defender; MF – Midfielder; FW – Forward

Players' appearances and goals by competition
Pos.	Nat.	Name	League		FA Cup		League Cup		Texaco Cup		Total	
Pos.	Nat.	Name	Apps	Goals	Apps	Goals	Apps	Goals	Apps	Goals	Apps	Goals
GK	ENG	Ritchie Blackmore	0	0	0	0	0	0	0 (1)	0	0 (1)	0
GK	ENG	Paul Cooper	2	0	0	0	0	0	1	0	3	0
GK	ENG	Mike Kelly	1	0	0	0	1	0	1 (1)	0	3 (1)	0
GK	ENG	Dave Latchford	25	0	0	0	1	0	2	0	28	0
GK	WAL	Gary Sprake	14	0	2	0	4	0	0	0	20	0
DF	ENG	Dennis Clarke	11	0	1	0	3	0	1 (1)	0	16 (1)	0
DF	ENG	Joe Gallagher	21 (5)	2	2	0	4	0	4	0	31 (5)	2
DF	SCO	Roger Hynd	34 (2)	2	1	0	5	0	2	0	42 (2)	2
DF	ENG	Ray Martin	29	0	2	0	1	0	0	0	32	0
DF	ENG	Ian Osborne	0	0	0	0	0	0	1	0	1	0
DF	ENG	Garry Pendrey	38 (2)	0	2	0	6	0	2	0	48 (2)	0
DF	WAL	John Roberts	28 (2)	0	1	0	5	0	2	0	36 (2)	0
DF	ENG	Archie Styles	3 (2)	1	0	0	0	0	0	0	3 (2)	1
DF	ENG	Tony Want	11	0	0	0	5	0	4	0	20	0
DF	ENG	Alan Whitehead	0	0	0	0	0	0	1	0	1	0
MF	ENG	Steve Bryant	0	0	0	0	0	0	1	0	1	0
MF	SCO	Jimmy Calderwood	7 (2)	0	0	0	0	0	1	0	8 (2)	0
MF	SCO	Alan Campbell	32 (3)	1	2	0	3	0	2	0	35 (3)	1
MF	WAL	Gary Emmanuel	0	0	0	0	0	0	0 (2)	0	0 (2)	0
MF	SCO	Paul Hendrie	5	0	0	0	3	0	1	0	9	0
MF	ENG	Lindley Jenkins	2	0	0	0	0	0	1	0	3	0
MF	ENG	Howard Kendall	15	1	0	0	0	0	0	0	15	1
MF	WAL	Malcolm Page	7	1	0	0	0	0	0	0	7	1
MF	ENG	Gordon Taylor	33 (2)	2	2	0	4 (1)	0	1	0	40 (3)	2
FW	SCO	Kenny Burns	36 (1)	10	1	0	6	2	3	0	46 (1)	12
FW	ENG	Trevor Francis	37	6	2	1	5	1	3	1	47	9
FW	ENG	Bob Hatton	39	14	2	2	6	4	4	0	51	20
FW	SCO	Bobby Hope	6	0	0	0	0	0	1 (1)	0	7 (1)	0
FW	ENG	Bob Latchford †	25 (1)	10	2	2	4 (1)	5	2	1	33 (2)	18
FW	ENG	Steve Phillips	1 (3)	1	0	0	0 (2)	0	2	0	3 (5)	1

== See also ==
- Birmingham City F.C. seasons
