= 1974–75 Birmingham City F.C. season =

Birmingham City F.C.
1974–75 season
- Chairman: Clifford Coombs
- Manager: Freddie Goodwin
- Ground: St Andrew's
- Football League First Division: 17th
- FA Cup: Semi-final (eliminated by Fulham)
- League Cup: Second round (eliminated by Crewe Alexandra)
- Texaco Cup: Semi-final (eliminated by Newcastle United)
- Top goalscorer: League: Bob Hatton (14); All: Bob Hatton (18)
- Highest home attendance: 47,260 vs Middlesbrough, FA Cup 6th round, 8 March 1975
- Lowest home attendance: 12,327 vs Ayr United, Texaco Cup 2nd round, 17 September 1974
- Average home league attendance: 30,854
Home colours

The 1974–75 Football League season was Birmingham City Football Club's 72nd in the Football League and their 41st in the First Division. They finished in 17th position in the 22-team division, four points above the relegation positions. They entered the 1974–75 FA Cup at the third round proper and lost to Fulham in the last minute of the semi-final replay, lost to Crewe Alexandra in their opening match of the League Cup in the second round, and reached the semi-final of the Texaco Cup.

Twenty-eight players made at least one appearance in nationally organised first-team competition, and there were thirteen different goalscorers. Goalkeeper Dave Latchford and forward Bob Hatton played in 53 of the 56 first-team matches over the season, and the leading goalscorer was Hatton with 18 goals, of which 14 came in league competition.

== Football League First Division ==
Date	League position	Opponents	Venue	Result	Score F–A	Scorers	Attendance
17 August 1974	17th	Middlesbrough	H	L	0–3		32,105
20 August 1974	18th	Leicester City	H	L	3–4	Burns, Francis 2 (1 pen)	27,663
24 August 1974	21st	Leeds United	A	L	0–1		30,820
28 August 1974	21st	Leicester City	A	D	1–1	Francis	24,018
31 August 1974	21st	Wolverhampton Wanderers	H	D	1–1	Burns	33,785
7 September 1974	17th	Queens Park Rangers	A	W	1–0	Gallagher	16,058
14 September 1974	15th	Derby County	H	W	3–2	Hatton, Francis 2 (2 pens)	27,345
21 September 1974	18th	Carlisle United	A	L	0–1		12,691
25 September 1974	21st	West Ham United	A	L	0–3		25,495
28 September 1974	14th	Arsenal	H	W	3–1	Burns, Hatton 2	25,584
5 October 1974	19th	Coventry City	H	L	1–2	Francis pen	30,282
12 October 1974	14th	Luton Town	A	W	3–1	Francis 3	15,097
15 October 1974	13th	Leeds United	H	W	1–0	Francis	36,513
19 October 1974	11th	Newcastle United	H	W	3–0	Burns, Styles, Hatton	33,339
26 October 1974	12th	Sheffield United	A	L	2–3	Hatton, Styles	21,639
2 November 1974	11th	Chelsea	H	W	2–0	Hatton, Kendall	30,764
9 November 1974	11th	Burnley	A	D	2–2	Rodaway og, Taylor	16,075
16 November 1974	11th	Manchester City	H	W	4–0	Kendall, Hatton 2, Burns	35,143
23 November 1974	9th	Tottenham Hotspur	A	D	0–0		27,761
30 November 1974	11th	Everton	A	L	1–4	Calderwood	38,369
7 December 1974	13th	Stoke City	H	L	0–3		33,999
14 December 1974	14th	Middlesbrough	A	L	0–3		23,737
21 December 1974	14th	Liverpool	H	W	3–1	Taylor, Kendall pen, Hatton	26,608
26 December 1974	15th	Derby County	A	L	1–2	Hatton	26,121
28 December 1974	16th	Ipswich Town	H	L	0–1		30,266
11 January 1975	17th	Stoke City	A	D	0–0		26,157
18 January 1975	18th	Everton	H	L	0–3		32,284
1 February 1975	17th	Burnley	H	D	1–1	Emmanuel	24,990
8 February 1975	18th	Chelsea	A	L	1–2	Hatton	18,144
18 February 1975	16th	Tottenham Hotspur	H	W	1–0	Hatton	24,240
22 February 1975	17th	Manchester City	A	L	1–3	Taylor	33,240
1 March 1975	16th	Wolverhampton Wanderers	A	W	1–0	Hendrie	28,256
15 March 1975	16th	Arsenal	A	D	1–1	Burns	17,845
18 March 1975	16th	West Ham United	H	D	1–1	Bryant	34,000
22 March 1975	16th	Queens Park Rangers	H	W	4–1	Francis, Campbell, Hatton, Calderwood	32,832
25 March 1975	13th	Carlisle United	H	W	2–0	Francis, Burns	33,761
29 March 1975	15th	Liverpool	A	L	0–1		49,454
1 April 1975	15th	Ipswich Town	A	L	2–3	Burns, Hatton	27,417
12 April 1975	18th	Coventry City	A	L	0–1		24,163
19 April 1975	18th	Luton Town	H	L	1–4	Francis	28,755
26 April 1975	17th	Newcastle United	A	W	2–1	Kendall, Pendrey	24,787
29 April 1975	17th	Sheffield United	H	D	0–0		33,677

=== League table (part) ===
Final First Division table (part)
Pos	Club	Pld	W	D	L	F	A	GA	Pts
15th	Newcastle United	42	15	9	18	59	72	0.87	39
16th	Arsenal	42	13	11	18	47	49	0.96	37
17th	Birmingham City	42	14	9	19	53	61	0.87	37
18th	Leicester City	42	12	12	18	46	60	0.77	36
19th	Tottenham Hotspur	42	13	8	21	52	63	0.82	34
Key	Pos = League position; Pld = Matches played; W = Matches won; D = Matches drawn; L = Matches lost; F = Goals for; A = Goals against; GA = Goal average; Pts = Points								

== FA Cup ==
For the third time in seven seasons, Birmingham reached the semi-final of the FA Cup. This time, they drew with Fulham at Hillsborough so the tie went to a replay, played at Maine Road, Manchester. Goalless through normal time and all but a few seconds of extra time – an announcement had already been made that the second replay would be at Highbury the following Monday – a long ball towards Birmingham's penalty area was struck by John Mitchell straight into goalkeeper Dave Latchford's face. The ball rebounded onto Mitchell's chest and back towards the goal to bobble over the line.

Round	Date	Opponents	Venue	Result	Score F–A	Scorers	Attendance
Third round	4 January 1975	Luton Town	A	W	1–0	Kendall	17,543
Fourth round	25 January 1975	Chelsea	A	W	1–0	Burns	36,650
Fifth round	15 February 1975	Walsall	H	W	2–1	Hatton, Burns	45,881
Sixth round	8 March 1975	Middlesbrough	H	W	1–0	Hatton	47,260
Semi-final	5 April 1975	Fulham	Hillsborough, Sheffield	D	1–1	Gallagher	54,166
Semi-final replay	9 April 1975	Fulham	Maine Road, Manchester	L	0–1 aet		35,205

== League Cup ==
Round	Date	Opponents	Venue	Result	Score F–A	Scorers	Attendance
Second round	11 September 1974	Crewe Alexandra	A	L	1–2	Gallagher	7,194

== Texaco Cup ==
Round	Date	Opponents	Venue	Result	Score F–A	Scorers	Attendance
Group 1	3 August 1974	West Bromwich Albion	A	D	0–0		18,643
Group 1	7 August 1974	Peterborough United	A	D	1–1	Taylor	8,915
Group 1	10 August 1974	Norwich City	H	W	3–1	Campbell, Francis, Hatton	14,847
Second round 1st leg	17 September 1974	Ayr United	H	W	3–0	Burns 2, Calderwood	12,327
Second round 2nd leg	2 October 1974	Ayr United	A	D	0–0		4,992
Semi-final 1st leg	23 October 1974	Newcastle United	A	D	1–1	Hatton	20,556
Semi-final 2nd leg	6 November 1974	Newcastle United	H	L	1–4	Burns	17,754

== Appearances and goals ==
Numbers in parentheses denote appearances made as a substitute.
Key to positions: GK – Goalkeeper; DF – Defender; MF – Midfielder; FW – Forward

Players' appearances and goals by competition
Pos.	Nat.	Name	League		FA Cup		League Cup		Texaco Cup		Total	
Pos.	Nat.	Name	Apps	Goals	Apps	Goals	Apps	Goals	Apps	Goals	Apps	Goals
GK	ENG	Mike Kelly	1	0	0	0	0	0	0	0	1	0
GK	ENG	Dave Latchford	39	0	6	0	1	0	7	0	53	0
GK	WAL	Gary Sprake	2	0	0	0	0	0	0 (2)	0	2 (2)	0
DF	ENG	Steve Bryant	15 (1)	1	3	0	0	0	1	0	19 (1)	1
DF	ENG	Dennis Clarke	3	0	1	0	0	0	0	0	4	0
DF	ENG	Joe Gallagher	38	1	6	1	1	1	5	0	50	3
DF	SCO	Roger Hynd	6 (6)	0	1	0	1	0	2	0	10 (6)	0
DF	ENG	Ray Martin	21 (1)	0	0	0	1	0	4	0	26 (1)	0
DF	ENG	Garry Pendrey	27 (3)	1	5	0	0 (1)	0	7	0	39 (4)	1
DF	WAL	John Roberts	7 (1)	0	2	0	0	0	3	0	12 (1)	0
DF	SCO	Ricky Sbragia	1	0	0	0	0	0	1 (1)	0	2 (1)	0
DF	ENG	Archie Styles	23	2	2	0	1	0	2	0	28	2
DF	ENG	Tony Want	0 (2)	0	0	0	0	0	0	0	0 (2)	0
MF	SCO	Jimmy Calderwood	25	2	1	0	0	0	4	0	30	2
MF	SCO	Alan Campbell	28	1	1 (1)	0	1	0	5	1	35 (1)	2
MF	WAL	Gary Emmanuel	9	1	4	0	0	0	0 (1)	0	13 (1)	1
MF	SCO	Paul Hendrie	9 (2)	1	3	0	1	0	3 (1)	0	16 (3)	1
MF	SCO	Bobby Hope	0	0	0	0	0	0	0 (2)	0	0 (2)	0
MF	ENG	Howard Kendall	39	4	6	1	1	0	6	0	50	5
MF	ENG	Roy Morton	3	0	0	0	0	0	2	0	5	0
MF	WAL	Malcolm Page	28	0	6	0	0	0	3	0	37	0
MF	ENG	Gordon Taylor	34 (1)	3	6	0	1	0	4 (1)	1	45 (2)	4
FW	ENG	Gary Allen	0	0	0	0	0	0	1	0	1	0
FW	SCO	Kenny Burns	39	8	6	2	1	0	6	3	52	13
FW	ENG	Trevor Francis	23	13	2	0	1	0	2	1	28	14
FW	ENG	Bob Hatton	41	14	5	2	0	0	7	2	53	18
FW	ENG	Steve Phillips	1 (1)	0	0	0	0	0	2	0	3 (1)	0
FW	SCO	Ian Smith	0 (2)	0	0	0	0	0	0	0	0 (2)	0

== See also ==
- Birmingham City F.C. seasons

== Sources ==
- Matthews, Tony (1995). Birmingham City: A Complete Record. Derby: Breedon Books. ISBN 978-1-85983-010-9.
- Matthews, Tony (2010). Birmingham City: The Complete Record. Derby: DB Publishing. ISBN 978-1-85983-853-2.
- For match dates and results: "Birmingham City 1974–1975 : Results". Statto Organisation. Archived from the original on 12 June 2015.
- For lineups, appearances, goalscorers and attendances: Matthews (2010), Complete Record, pp. 384–85, 479.
