= 1968–69 Birmingham City F.C. season =

Birmingham City F.C.
1968–69 season
- Chairman: Clifford Coombs
- Manager: Stan Cullis
- Ground: St Andrew's
- Football League Second Division: 7th
- FA Cup: Fifth round (eliminated by Manchester United)
- Football League Cup: Second round (eliminated by Chelsea)
- Top goalscorer: League: Phil Summerill (16); All: Fred Pickering, Phil Summerill (17)
- Highest home attendance: 51,685 vs Manchester United, FA Cup 5th round, 11 February 1969
- Lowest home attendance: 18,958 vs Bristol City, 14 December 1968
- Average home league attendance: 26,008
Home colours

The 1969–70 Football League season was Birmingham City Football Club's 66th in the Football League and their 28th in the Second Division. They made a poor start, suffering seven defeats in the first nine matches, but an improved second half of the season led to a seventh-place finish in the 22-team division. They entered the 1969–70 FA Cup in the third round proper, reaching the fifth round in which they lost to Manchester United after a replay, and were beaten by Chelsea in their opening second-round match in the League Cup.

Twenty-three players made at least one appearance in nationally organised first-team competition, and there were twelve different goalscorers. Midfielder Johnny Vincent played in 46 of the 48 first-team matches over the season. Fred Pickering and Phil Summerill finished as joint leading goalscorers with 17 goals in all competitions; the best goal return in League competition was Summerill's 16.

== Football League Second Division ==
On 7 September 1968, the home match against Huddersfield Town saw Geoff Vowden become the first substitute to score a hat-trick in a Football League match.

- Note that Birmingham were in sixth place in the division after their last match of the season, played on 19 April, but not every team completed their fixtures on that date. By the time all matches had been played, on 30 April, they had dropped to seventh.

Date	League position	Opponents	Venue	Result	Score F–A	Scorers	Attendance
10 August 1968	17th	Norwich City	H	L	1–2	Pickering	27,715
27 August 1968	20th	Crystal Palace	A	L	2–3	Vowden, Vincent	17,679
20 August 1968	22nd	Charlton Athletic	A	L	1–3	Vincent	14,220
24 August 1968	17th	Portsmouth	H	W	5–2	Pickering 2, Vowden, Summerill, Tindall og	23,915
28 August 1968	21st	Cardiff City	A	L	0–4		14,967
31 August 1968	22nd	Preston North End	A	L	1–4	Greenhoff	13,112
7 September 1968	19th	Huddersfield Town	H	W	5–1	Greenhoff, Pickering, Vowden 3	25,001
14 September 1968	21st	Middlesbrough	A	L	1–3	Vincent	17,398
17 September 1968	21st	Bury	H	L	1–3	Greenhoff	24,178
21 September 1968	20th	Aston Villa	H	W	4–0	Vowden, Greenhoff, Vincent, Summerill	40,527
28 September 1968	18th	Carlisle United	A	W	3–2	Greenhoff, Summerill, Green	7,623
5 October 1968	17th	Fulham	H	W	5–4	Greenhoff 4, Vincent	28,448
8 October 1968	15th	Cardiff City	H	W	2–0	Greenhoff, Vincent	28,238
12 October 1968	15th	Bristol City	A	D	0–0		19,578
19 October 1968	15th	Millwall	H	L	1–2	Greenhoff pen	29,770
26 October 1968	17th	Derby County	A	L	0–1		34,218
2 November 1968	18th	Oxford United	H	L	0–1		23,466
9 November 1968	19th	Blackburn Rovers	A	L	2–3	Pickering 2	11,721
16 November 1968	17th	Blackpool	H	W	1–0	Summerill	22,206
23 November 1968	17th	Bolton Wanderers	A	D	0–0		7,175
30 November 1968	16th	Hull City	H	W	5–2	Pickering, Greenhoff, Summerill 3	21,352
7 December 1968	17th	Sheffield United	A	L	0–2		14,339
14 December 1968	17th	Bristol City	H	W	2–0	Pickering 2	18,958
21 December 1968	16th	Millwall	A	W	3–1	Pickering, Vincent, Darrell	12,652
26 December 1968	17th	Fulham	A	L	0–2		13,192
11 January 1968	15th	Oxford United	A	W	2–1	Pickering, Summerill	11,587
14 January 1969	14th	Derby County	H	D	1–1	Pickering	39,977
18 January 1969	12th	Blackburn Rovers	H	W	3–1	Pickering, Robinson pen, Coddington og	27,161
1 February 1969	14th	Blackpool	A	L	1–2	James og	11,294
1 March 1969	17th	Norwich City	A	D	1–1	Vowden	15,894
4 March 1969	16th	Sheffield United	H	D	2–2	Pickering, Beard	25,123
8 March 1969	16th	Crystal Palace	H	L	0–1		25,298
15 March 1969	15th	Portsmouth	A	D	0–0		15,556
22 March 1969	13th	Preston North End	H	W	3–1	R. Latchford 2, Summerill	22,020
25 March 1969	11th	Bolton Wanderers	H	W	5–0	Vincent, Summerill 3, Beard	20,454
29 March 1969	11th	Huddersfield Town	A	D	0–0		8,105
5 April 1969	11th	Carlisle United	H	W	3–0	Greenhoff 2, Hockey	22,397
7 April 1969	11th	Charlton Athletic	H	D	0–0		25,884
8 April 1969	9th	Bury	A	W	2–1	Summerill 2	5,819
12 April 1969	10th	Aston Villa	A	L	0–1		53,647
15 April 1969	8th	Hull City	A	W	2–1	Vincent, Hockey	8,702
19 April 1969	6th	Middlesbrough	H	W	3–1	Summerill 2, G. Smith og	25,899

=== League table (part) ===
Final Second Division table (part)
Pos	Club	Pld	W	D	L	F	A	GA	Pts
5th	Cardiff City	42	20	7	15	67	54	1.24	47
6th	Huddersfield Town	42	17	12	13	53	46	1.15	46
7th	Birmingham City	42	18	8	16	73	59	1.24	44
8th	Blackpool	42	14	15	13	51	41	1.24	43
9th	Sheffield United	42	16	11	15	61	50	1.22	43
Key	Pos = League position; Pld = Matches played; W = Matches won; D = Matches drawn; L = Matches lost; F = Goals for; A = Goals against; GA = Goal average; Pts = Points								

== FA Cup ==
Round	Date	Opponents	Venue	Result	Score F–A	Scorers	Attendance
Third round	4 January 1969	Lincoln City	H	W	2–1	Pickering, Robinson	31,429
Fourth round	25 January 1969	Sheffield Wednesday	A	D	2–2	Pickering, Thwaites	52,062
Fourth round replay	28 January 1969	Sheffield Wednesday	H	W	2–1	Pickering, Beard	51,463
Fifth round	11 February 1969	Manchester United	H	D	2–2	Beard, Robinson	51,685
Fifth round replay	24 February 1969	Manchester United	A	L	2–6	Greenhoff, Summerill	61,934

== League Cup ==
Round	Date	Opponents	Venue	Result	Score F–A	Scorers	Attendance
Second round	3 September 1968	Chelsea	H	L	0–1		31,530

== Appearances and goals ==
Numbers in parentheses denote appearances made as a substitute.
Players marked † left the club during the playing season.
Key to positions: GK – Goalkeeper; DF – Defender; MF – Midfielder; FW – Forward

Players' appearances and goals by competition
Pos.	Nat.	Name	League		FA Cup		League Cup		Total	
Pos.	Nat.	Name	Apps	Goals	Apps	Goals	Apps	Goals	Apps	Goals
GK	SCO	Jim Herriot	38	0	5	0	1	0	44	0
GK	ENG	Dave Latchford	4	0	0	0	0	0	4	0
DF	ENG	Winston Foster	5	0	0	0	1	0	6	0
DF	WAL	Colin Green	28	1	5	0	1	0	34	1
DF	ENG	Ray Martin	31 (1)	0	5	0	0 (1)	0	36 (2)	0
DF	ENG	Bert Murray	8 (2)	0	0	0	1	0	9 (2)	0
DF	ENG	Garry Pendrey	10	0	0	0	0	0	10	0
DF	ENG	Dave Robinson	29	1	5	2	0	0	34	3
DF	ENG	Brian Sharples	1	0	0	0	0	0	1	0
DF	ENG	John Sleeuwenhoek	7 (1)	0	0 (1)	0	0	0	8 (2)	0
DF	ENG	Bobby Thomson	10	0	0	0	0	0	10	0
MF	ENG	Malcolm Beard	32	2	3 (1)	2	1	0	36 (1)	4
MF	WAL	Malcolm Page	33 (1)	0	5	0	1	0	39 (1)	0
MF	SCO	Ron Wylie	26	0	3	0	1	0	30	0
FW	ENG	Barry Bridges †	2	0	0	0	0	0	2	0
FW	ENG	Mick Darrell	4 (1)	1	1	0	0	0	5 (1)	1
FW	ENG	Jimmy Greenhoff	31	14	5	1	0	0	36	15
FW	WAL	Trevor Hockey	37	2	5	0	0	0	42	2
FW	ENG	Bob Latchford	4	2	0	0	0	0	4	2
FW	ENG	Fred Pickering	32	14	5	3	2	0	40	17
FW	ENG	Phil Summerill	28 (2)	16	1 (1)	1	1	0	30 (3)	17
FW	ENG	Denis Thwaites	2	0	3	1	0	0	5	1
FW	ENG	Johnny Vincent	40 (1)	9	4	0	1	0	45 (1)	9
FW	ENG	Geoff Vowden	22 (4)	7	0	0	1	0	23 (4)	7

== See also ==
- Birmingham City F.C. seasons
