= 1969–70 Birmingham City F.C. season =

Birmingham City F.C.
1969–70 season
- Chairman: Clifford Coombs
- Manager: Stan Cullis; (until 18 March 1970); Don Dorman and; Bill Shorthouse; (joint caretakers); Freddie Goodwin; (from 29 May)
- Ground: St Andrew's
- Football League Second Division: 18th
- FA Cup: Third round (eliminated by Chelsea)
- Football League Cup: Second round (eliminated by Brighton & Hove Albion)
- Top goalscorer: League: Phil Summerill (13); All: Phil Summerill (13)
- Highest home attendance: 41,696 vs Aston Villa, 30 March 1970
- Lowest home attendance: 13,530 vs Hull City, 4 April 1970
- Average home league attendance: 24,028
Home colours

The 1969–70 Football League season was Birmingham City Football Club's 67th in the Football League and their 29th in the Second Division. They finished in 18th position in the 22-team division. They entered the 1969–70 FA Cup in the third round proper and the League Cup in the second round; they lost their opening match in each competition, to Chelsea and Brighton & Hove Albion respectively.

Stan Cullis resigned as manager and retired from football in March 1970, and chief scout Don Dorman and coach Bill Shorthouse finished the playing season as caretaker managers. After unsuccessful approaches were made to Don Revie, Brian Clough and Ronnie Allen, Brighton & Hove Albion manager Freddie Goodwin took on the job at the end of May.

Twenty players made at least one appearance in nationally organised first-team competition, and there were eleven different goalscorers. Defenders Ray Martin and Bobby Thomson played in all 44 first-team matches over the season. Phil Summerill finished as leading goalscorer for the second successive season, with 13 goals, all of which came in league competition.

== Football League Second Division ==
Date	League position	Opponents	Venue	Result	Score F–A	Scorers	Attendance
9 August 1969	16th	Leicester City	A	L	1–3	Summerill	35,168
16 August 1969	20th	Oxford United	H	L	1–3	Summerill	27,067
19 August 1969	19th	Portsmouth	H	D	1–1	Summerill	24,976
23 August 1969	21st	Blackpool	A	L	0–2		17,495
27 August 1969	19th	Hull City	A	D	0–0		12,242
30 August 1969	17th	Queens Park Rangers	H	W	3–0	Murray 3	32,660
6 September 1969	18th	Bolton Wanderers	A	L	0–2		11,303
13 September 1969	17th	Sheffield United	H	W	2–1	Vincent, Murray	27,201
16 September 1969	14th	Norwich City	H	W	3-1	Murray, Summerill 2	26,408
20 September 1969	12th	Charlton Athletic	A	W	1–0	Hateley	13,999
27 September 1969	11th	Carlisle United	H	D	1–1	Summerill	28,781
4 October 1969	13th	Bristol City	A	L	0–2		18,694
8 October 1969	15th	Oxford United	A	L	0–2		12,621
11 October 1969	13th	Blackburn Rovers	H	W	3–0	Vowden 2, Summerill	25,602
18 October 1969	12th	Aston Villa	A	D	0–0		54,405
25 October 1969	13th	Cardiff City	H	D	1–1	Hateley	28,287
1 November 1969	11th	Watford	A	W	3–2	Vincent, Vowden, Murray	17,436
8 November 1969	11th	Swindon Town	H	W	2–0	Vowden, Murray	28,391
12 November 1969	8th	Portsmouth	A	D	1–1	Murray	16,508
15 November 1969	12th	Preston North End	A	L	1–4	Hateley	9,692
22 November 1969	10th	Millwall	H	W	2–0	Hateley, Vincent	22,564
6 December 1969	11th	Huddersfield Town	H	D	2–2	Vowden, Murray	24,956
13 December 1969	12th	Sheffield United	A	L	0–6		17,332
16 December 1969	12th	Middlesbrough	A	L	2–4	Hateley, Murray	17,020
26 December 1969	12th	Blackpool	H	L	2–3	James og, Hateley	29,548
27 December 1969	12th	Queens Park Rangers	A	L	1–2	Page	15,688
10 January 1969	12th	Charlton Athletic	H	W	3–0	Vincent, Beard, Johnston	18,031
17 January 1970	12th	Carlisle United	A	L	3–4	Summerill 3	7,912
31 January 1970	13th	Bristol City	H	D	2–2	Vincent, Summerill	20,421
14 February 1969	16th	Leicester City	H	L	0–1		28,232
21 February 1970	18th	Cardiff City	A	L	1–3	Bell og	21,887
24 February 1970	15th	Bolton Wanderers	H	W	2–0	Vincent, Summerill	19,489
28 February 1970	15th	Watford	H	D	0–0		22,796
4 March 1970	15th	Blackburn Rovers	A	D	1–1	Mulvaney og	8,639
11 March 1970	17th	Millwall	A	L	2–6	Hockey, Murray	7,825
14 March 1970	15th	Middlesbrough	H	D	0–0		17,974
21 March 1970	17th	Huddersfield Town	A	L	0–2		18,502
28 March 1970	16th	Preston North End	H	W	1–0	Vowden	16,469
30 March 1970	17th	Aston Villa	H	L	0–2		41,696
31 March 1970	17th	Swindon Town	A	L	1–4	Summerill	21,098
4 April 1970	18th	Hull City	H	L	2–4	R. Latchford, Martin	13,530
15 April 1970	18th	Norwich City	A	L	0–6		12,134

=== League table (part) ===
Final Second Division table (part)
Pos	Club	Pld	W	D	L	F	A	GA	Pts
16th	Bolton Wanderers	42	12	12	18	54	61	0.89	36
17th	Portsmouth	42	13	9	20	66	80	0.82	35
18th	Birmingham City	42	11	11	20	51	78	0.65	33
19th	Watford	42	9	13	20	44	57	0.77	31
20th	Charlton Athletic	42	7	17	18	35	76	0.46	31
Key	Pos = League position; Pld = Matches played; W = Matches won; D = Matches drawn; L = Matches lost; F = Goals for; A = Goals against; GA = Goal average; Pts = Points								

== FA Cup ==
Round	Date	Opponents	Venue	Result	Score F–A	Scorers	Attendance
Third round	3 January 1970	Chelsea	A	L	0–3		45,088

== League Cup ==
Round	Date	Opponents	Venue	Result	Score F–A	Scorers	Attendance
Second round	3 September 1969	Brighton & Hove Albion	A	L	0–2		24,232

== Appearances and goals ==
Numbers in parentheses denote appearances made as a substitute.
Key to positions: GK – Goalkeeper; DF – Defender; MF – Midfielder; FW – Forward

Players' appearances and goals by competition
Pos.	Nat.	Name	League		FA Cup		League Cup		Total	
Pos.	Nat.	Name	Apps	Goals	Apps	Goals	Apps	Goals	Apps	Goals
GK	SCO	Jim Herriot	26	0	1	0	1	0	28	0
GK	ENG	Dave Latchford	16	0	0	0	0	0	16	0
DF	ENG	Ray Martin	42	1	1	0	1	0	44	1
DF	ENG	Garry Pendrey	27	0	0	0	1	0	28	0
DF	ENG	Dave Robinson	33	0	1	0	1	0	35	0
DF	ENG	John Sleeuwenhoek	9	0	0	0	0	0	9	0
DF	ENG	Bobby Thomson	42	0	1	0	1	0	44	0
MF	ENG	Malcolm Beard	38	1	1	0	1	0	40	1
MF	WAL	Trevor Hockey	41	1	1	0	1	0	43	1
MF	WAL	Malcolm Page	17 (1)	1	1	0	1	0	18 (1)	1
MF	ENG	Johnny Vincent	36	6	1	0	1	0	38	6
MF	ENG	Ron Wylie	1 (3)	0	0	0	0	0	1 (3)	0
FW	ENG	Mick Darrell	0 (1)	0	0	0	0	0	0 (1)	0
FW	ENG	Tony Hateley	26	6	1	0	0	0	27	6
FW	SCO	George Johnston	6 (3)	1	0	0	0	0	6 (3)	1
FW	ENG	Bob Latchford	10	1	0	0	1	0	11	1
FW	ENG	Bert Murray	33 (1)	11	1	0	1	0	35 (1)	11
FW	ENG	Phil Summerill	30 (4)	13	0	0	0	0	30 (4)	13
FW	ENG	Denis Thwaites	0	0	0	0	1	0	1	0
FW	ENG	Geoff Vowden	29 (3)	6	1	0	0	0	30 (3)	6

== See also ==
- Birmingham City F.C. seasons
