= Bobby Thomson (footballer, born 1943) =

English footballer (1943–2009)

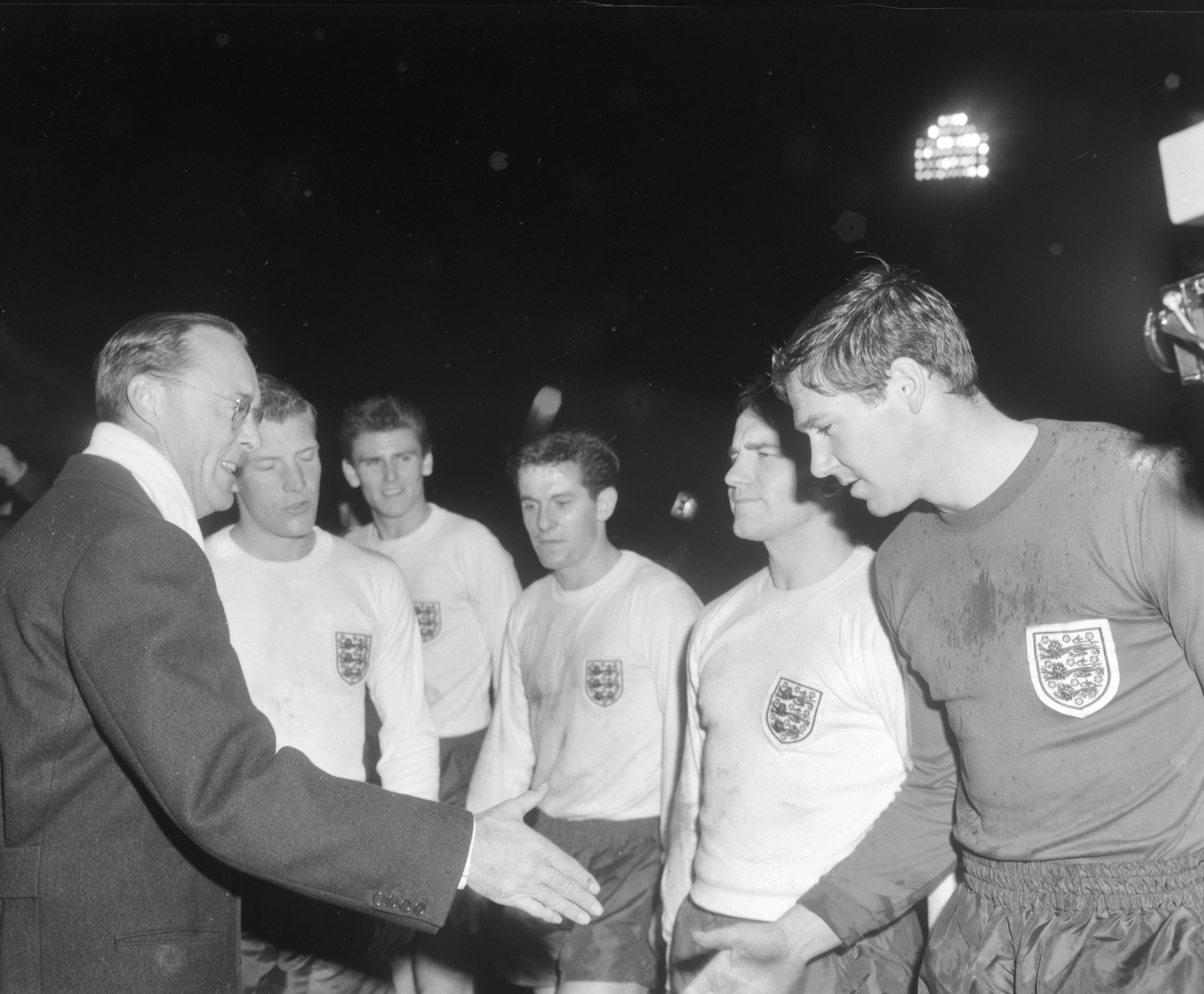
- Thomson in December 1964, pictured in the background, behind Ron Flowers

Personal information
- Full name: Robert Anthony Thomson
- Date of birth: 5 December 1943
- Place of birth: Smethwick, Worcestershire, England
- Date of death: 19 August 2009 (aged 65)
- Place of death: Dudley, England
- Height: 5 ft 11 1/2 in (1.82 m)
- Position: Left-back

Youth career
- 1959–1961: Wolverhampton Wanderers

Senior career*
Years	Team	Apps	(Gls)
1961–1969	Wolverhampton Wanderers	278	(2)
1967	→ Los Angeles Wolves (guest)	12	(3)
1969–1972	Birmingham City	63	(0)
1971	→ Walsall (loan)	9	(1)
1972–1976	Luton Town	110	(1)
1976	Hartford Bicentennials	24	(0)
1976–1977	Port Vale	18	(0)
1977	Connecticut Bicentennials	25	(0)
1977–1978	Worcester City	14	(1)
1978–1979	Memphis Rogues	51	(1)
1979–1980	Stafford Rangers	16	(0)
1980	Memphis Rogues	27	(0)
1981	Willenhall Town	3	(0)
- Brewood
- Solihull Borough
- Tipton Town

International career
1963–1967	England U23	15	(0)
1963–1964	England	8	(0)

Managerial career
- 1977: Connecticut Bicentennials
- 1981–1983: Stafford Rangers
- * Club domestic league appearances and goals

Robert Anthony Thomson (5 December 1943 – 19 August 2009) was an English professional footballer. He made 478 appearances in the English Football League and won eight caps for England.

Something of a legend at his first club – Wolverhampton Wanderers, he is considered to be one of the finest full-backs ever to have played for the team. Departing Wolves in 1969, he then moved on to Birmingham City and then Luton Town. He was promoted out of the Second Division with all three clubs. His later career involved moving between numerous clubs at home and abroad. He spent time as player-coach at Connecticut Bicentennials and player-manager of Stafford Rangers.

== Early and personal life ==
Robert Anthony Thomson was born on 5 December 1943 in Smethwick, Worcestershire. He married Janice Llewellyn in 1966 and had three children. After retiring from playing, he ran a sports shop in Sedgley in the West Midlands. He was known to take part in Wolves All Stars charity games from his retirement up until his last years, as well as help coach youngsters in Oldbury. He died of prostate cancer at Russells Hall Hospital in Dudley at the age of 65. He had recovered from the first occurrence of the illness, only to succumb after suffering a relapse.

== Club career ==
Thomson was born in Smethwick, which was then in Staffordshire. He joined local side Wolverhampton Wanderers in 1959 upon leaving Lyndon High School in Solihull. He signed professional forms in July 1961, before making his senior debut on 27 January 1962 in an FA Cup tie against Black Country rivals West Bromwich Albion. Between his debut in 1962 and 1967, he missed just 11 first-team games.

Unfortunately for Thomson, he was too late for the glory years and instead came through under the tail-end of manager Stan Cullis' 16-year reign. Their best finish during Thomson's time was fifth in the First Division in 1962–63. The club fell to the Second Division in 1964–65. They won promotion at the second time of asking – in 1966–67, as runners-up. In the summer of 1967, he was part of the Wolves side that played in the United States, guesting as the Los Angeles Wolves. Under that guise, they won the United Soccer Association league championship.

In March 1969, Thomson moved on to Birmingham City for £40,000, teaming up with his former boss Stan Cullis, though Cullis retired early the next year. He played 44 games of the 1969–70 campaign in a settled back four made up of Thomson, Dave Robinson, Garry Pendrey, and Ray Martin. However, he fell out of favour under a new boss Freddie Goodwin and featured just 15 times in 1970–71. In 1971–72, Birmingham gained promotion to the top tier, as runners-up behind Norwich City. He did not play any first-team games however, and instead spent part of 1971 on loan at nearby Third Division club Walsall.

In 1972, he moved on to Luton Town, another Second Division side with ambitions of top-flight football. Thomson's teams had a knack for finishing second in the second tier, as the "Hatters" achieved this in 1973–74, as they watched Middlesbrough sprint away with the title. Luton were unfortunate to go back down in 1974–75, finishing a mere point from the safety of Tottenham Hotspur in 19th.

In 1976, his career was drawing to a close, and his best days behind him, Thomson went back to the States, spending a short period with Hartford Bicentennials. He returned to the English Football League, and the West Midlands, with Third Division Port Vale in October 1976. He made an 'impressive' debut in a 3–2 defeat to Wrexham at Vale Park on 16 October 1976 and earned himself both a regular first-team spot and the captaincy. He played 24 games for Roy Sproson's team in 1976–77, before he returned to the re-branded Connecticut Bicentennials as player-coach in March 1977.

He stayed with the Connecticut Bicentennials for two years before returning to England with non-League Worcester City. He later became player-manager of Stafford Rangers. Another spell in the US with Memphis Rogues in the NASL followed before he joined Brewood, Solihull Borough and then Tipton Town.

== International career ==
Thomson won eight full caps with the senior team between 1963 and 1964. He was selected by Alf Ramsey and made his full international debut on 20 November 1963 in an 8–3 Home International victory over Northern Ireland. His final international appearance came in December 1964.

He also played 15 games for the England under-23 team, which was a record.

== Style of play ==
Thomson was an exceptionally fast full-back and was also extremely adept at back-pedalling.

== Career statistics ==
=== Club ===
Appearances and goals by club, season and competition
Club	Season	League			National cup (Note: Includes FA Cup.)		Other		Total	
Club	Season	Division	Apps	Goals	Apps	Goals	Apps	Goals	Apps	Goals
Wolverhampton Wanderers	1961–62	First Division	14	0	1	0	0	0	15	0
Wolverhampton Wanderers	1962–63	First Division	42	0	1	0	0	0	43	0
Wolverhampton Wanderers	1963–64	First Division	42	0	1	0	0	0	43	0
Wolverhampton Wanderers	1964–65	First Division	40	0	8	0	0	0	48	0
Wolverhampton Wanderers	1965–66	Second Division	41	0	3	0	0	0	44	0
Wolverhampton Wanderers	1966–67	Second Division	39	1	4	1	2	0	45	2
Wolverhampton Wanderers	1967–68	First Division	36	1	0	0	0	0	36	1
Wolverhampton Wanderers	1968–69	First Division	24	0	2	0	0	0	26	0
Wolverhampton Wanderers	Total		278	2	20	1	2	0	300	3
Los Angeles Wolves (guest)	1967	United Soccer Association	12	3					12	3
Birmingham City	1968–69	Second Division	10	0	0	0	0	0	10	0
Birmingham City	1969–70	Second Division	42	0	1	0	1	0	44	0
Birmingham City	1970–71	Second Division	11	0	0	0	4	0	15	0
Birmingham City	Total		63	0	1	0	5	0	69	0
Luton Town	1972–73	Second Division	42	0	4	0	7	1	53	1
Luton Town	1973–74	Second Division	42	1	4	0	6	0	52	1
Luton Town	1974–75	First Division	17	0	0	0	4	0	21	0
Luton Town	1975–76	Second Division	9	0	0	0	0	0	9	0
Luton Town	Total		110	1	8	0	17	1	135	2
Walsall (loan)	1971–72	Third Division	9	1	0	0	0	0	9	1
Hartford Bicentennials	1976	NASL	24	0					24	0
Port Vale	1976–77	Third Division	18	0	6	0	0	0	24	0
Connecticut Bicentennials	1977	NASL	25	0					25	0
Memphis Rogues	1978	NASL	22	0					22	0
Memphis Rogues	1979	NASL	29	1					29	1
Memphis Rogues	1979–80	NASL Indoor	11	0					11	0
Memphis Rogues	1980	NASL	27	0					27	0
Memphis Rogues	Total		89	1	0	0	0	0	89	1
Career total										

=== International ===
Appearances and goals by national team and year
National team	Year	Apps	Goals
England	1963	1	0
England	1964	7	0
Total		8	0

== Honours ==
Wolverhampton Wanderers

- Football League Second Division second-place promotion: 1966–67

Luton Town

- Football League Second Division second-place promotion: 1973–74

England

- British Home Championship: 1963–64 (shared), 1964–65
