= Ian Osborne =

English footballer

Personal information
- Full name: Ian Leonard Osborne
- Date of birth: 28 October 1952 (age 73)
- Place of birth: Leicester, England
- Height: 5 ft 8 in (1.73 m)
- Position: Full back

Youth career
- 1968–1970: Birmingham City

Senior career*
Years	Team	Apps	(Gls)
1970–1976	Birmingham City	10	(0)
1976–1977	Port Vale	15	(0)
–	Hillingdon Borough		
–	Westfields		
- * Club domestic league appearances and goals

Ian Leonard Osborne (born 28 October 1952) is an English former professional footballer who played in the Football League for Birmingham City and Port Vale.

== Career ==
Osborne was born in Leicester. When he left school in 1968, he joined Birmingham City as an apprentice and turned professional two years later. A pacey full back, he spent a long time in the reserve team before eventually making his debut in the First Division on 16 August 1975, the opening game of the 1975–76 season, in a 3–3 draw at Leicester City. Osborne played a few more games that season, deputising for Ray Martin who was nearing the end of his Birmingham career, but his defending was not considered up to standard and he was allowed to leave. He then spent a season with Port Vale where he played the opening six games of the season for the Third Division side. After losing his place in September 1976, he did not get another game until April the next year, though he did play nine of the last ten games. He left on a free transfer in May 1977, moving into non-League football with Hillingdon Borough and Westfields.

== Career statistics ==
Appearances and goals by club, season and competition
Club	Season	League			FA Cup		Other		Total	
Club	Season	Division	Apps	Goals	Apps	Goals	Apps	Goals	Apps	Goals
Birmingham City	1973–74	First Division	0	0	0	0	1	0	1	0
Birmingham City	1974–75	First Division	0	0	0	0	0	0	0	0
Birmingham City	1975–76	First Division	10	0	1	0	0	0	11	0
Birmingham City	Total		10	0	1	0	1	0	12	0
Port Vale	1976–77	Third Division	15	0	0	0	2	0	17	0
