= Lindley Jenkins =

English footballer

Personal information
- Full name: James Lindley Jenkins
- Date of birth: 6 April 1954 (age 72)
- Place of birth: West Bromwich, England
- Position: Midfielder

Youth career
- 1970–1971: Birmingham City

Senior career*
| Years | Team | Apps | (Gls) |
| 1971–1974 | Birmingham City | 2 | (0) |
| 1974–1975 | Walsall | 3 | (0) |
| 1975–19?? | Tividale | | |
- * Club domestic league appearances and goals

James Lindley Jenkins (born 6 April 1954) is an English former professional footballer who played in the Football League for Birmingham City and Walsall. He played as a midfielder.

Jenkins was born in West Bromwich, Staffordshire. As a boy he had trials for the England schoolboys team. When he left school in 1970 he joined Birmingham City as an apprentice, and played in the same youth team as future international players Trevor Francis and Kenny Burns. Jenkins turned professional in 1971, but had to wait until 10 November 1973 for his debut, deputising for Alan Campbell in the starting eleven for the home game against Southampton which finished as a 1–1 draw. He also played in the next game, but was given a free transfer at the end of the 1973–74 season and joined Walsall. Jenkins made three appearances in the Third Division but dropped into non-league football with Tividale in 1975.
