= Paul Overton =

English footballer

Personal information
- Full name: Paul Henry Overton
- Date of birth: 18 April 1961 (age 65)
- Place of birth: Soham, England
- Position: Goalkeeper

Youth career
- Ipswich Town

Senior career*
Years	Team	Apps	(Gls)
1978–1979	Ipswich Town	1	(0)
1979–1980	Peterborough United	0	(0)
1980–1981	Northampton Town	0	(0)
- Histon
- Cambridge United
- Chatteris Town
- Soham Town Rangers
- * Club domestic league appearances and goals

Paul Henry Overton (born 18 April 1961) is an English former footballer who played as a goalkeeper in the Football League for Ipswich Town.

== Career ==
Overton began his career in the youth set-up at Ipswich Town. On 28 April 1978, Overton made his debut for Ipswich in a 6–1 defeat away to Aston Villa, a week before Ipswich's FA Cup final victory against Arsenal. Overton's inclusion in the starting XI came after first choice goalkeeper Paul Cooper failed a fitness test due to a back injury, not wanting to risk aggravating it before Ipswich's maiden FA Cup final appearance. Ipswich manager Bobby Robson singled out Overton as the best player in Ipswich's 6–1 defeat. Following his departure from Ipswich in 1979, Overton joined Peterborough United and Northampton Town for a season each.

Overton later dropped down into Non-League football, playing for Histon, Cambridge United, Chatteris Town and hometown club Soham Town Rangers in the Eastern Counties League. Overton later managed Soham's reserves, before leaving the role in 2010.
