= Roy Morton =

English footballer

Personal information
- Full name: Roy Steven Morton
- Date of birth: 29 October 1955 (age 71)
- Place of birth: Birmingham, England
- Position: Midfielder

Youth career
- 1971–1972: Manchester United

Senior career*
Years	Team	Apps	(Gls)
1972–1973	Manchester United	0	(0)
1973–1977	Birmingham City	3	(0)
1977–19??	AP Leamington		

International career
1971	England Schoolboys	7	(4)
- * Club domestic league appearances and goals

Roy Steven Morton (born 29 October 1955) is an English former professional footballer who played in the Football League for Birmingham City. He played as a midfielder.

Morton was born in Birmingham. He excelled in schools football, and was capped by England at schoolboy level. When he left school in 1971 he signed for Manchester United as an apprentice. He was given a professional contract a year later, but by 1973 it had become clear that he was not going to break through to the senior team, and he was allowed to join Birmingham City on a free transfer. He made his debut in the First Division on 15 March 1975, in a 1–1 draw away at Arsenal, and played twice more in the 1974–75 season, but one appearance in the following season's League Cup was his last for the first team. In June 1977, still only 21 years old, he left for non-league football with AP Leamington, where he played at least until the 1981–82 season.
