= Mike Harrison (footballer, born 1952) =

English footballer

Personal information
- Full name: Michael Harrison
- Date of birth: 21 December 1952 (age 73)
- Place of birth: Leicester, England
- Position: Centre half

Youth career
- 1968–1970: Birmingham City

Senior career*
Years	Team	Apps	(Gls)
1970–1972	Birmingham City	3	(0)
1972–1973	Southend United	16	(0)
1973–1979	Yeovil Town		
- * Club domestic league appearances and goals

Michael Harrison (born 21 December 1952) is an English former professional footballer who made 19 appearances in the Football League playing for Birmingham City and Southend United. He played as a centre half.

== Playing career ==
Harrison was born in Leicester, Leicestershire. When he left school in 1968 he joined Birmingham City as an apprentice, turning professional two years later. He captained Birmingham's youth team, and made his debut as an 18-year-old, deputising for Dave Robinson in a 4–1 win at Leicester City on 16 January 1971. He kept his place for the next game in the absence of Roger Hynd, and played once more the following season in place of Stan Harland. In the 1972 close season Harrison joined Southend United, where he spent one season and played 18 games in all competitions.

His next club was Yeovil Town of the Southern League. In the 1974–75 season, his second with the club, Harrison was named Player of the Year. The following season, under player-manager Stan Harland whom Harrison had understudied at Birmingham, the club achieved a "runners-up double" in the Southern League and the Southern League Cup, success which prompted invitation into the 1976–77 Anglo-Italian Semiprofessional Tournament, to play against Italian Serie C teams. Harrison was again named Player of the Season. In all competitions, he made 304 appearances for Yeovil Town over a six-year career.
