= Bill Shorthouse =

English footballer (1922–2008)

Personal information
- Full name: William Henry Shorthouse
- Date of birth: 27 May 1922
- Place of birth: Bilston, England
- Date of death: 6 September 2008 (aged 86)
- Place of death: Wolverhampton, England
- Position: Defender

Senior career*
Years	Team	Apps	(Gls)
1941–1956	Wolverhampton Wanderers	344	(1)

Managerial career
- 1970: Birmingham City (joint caretaker)
- * Club domestic league appearances and goals

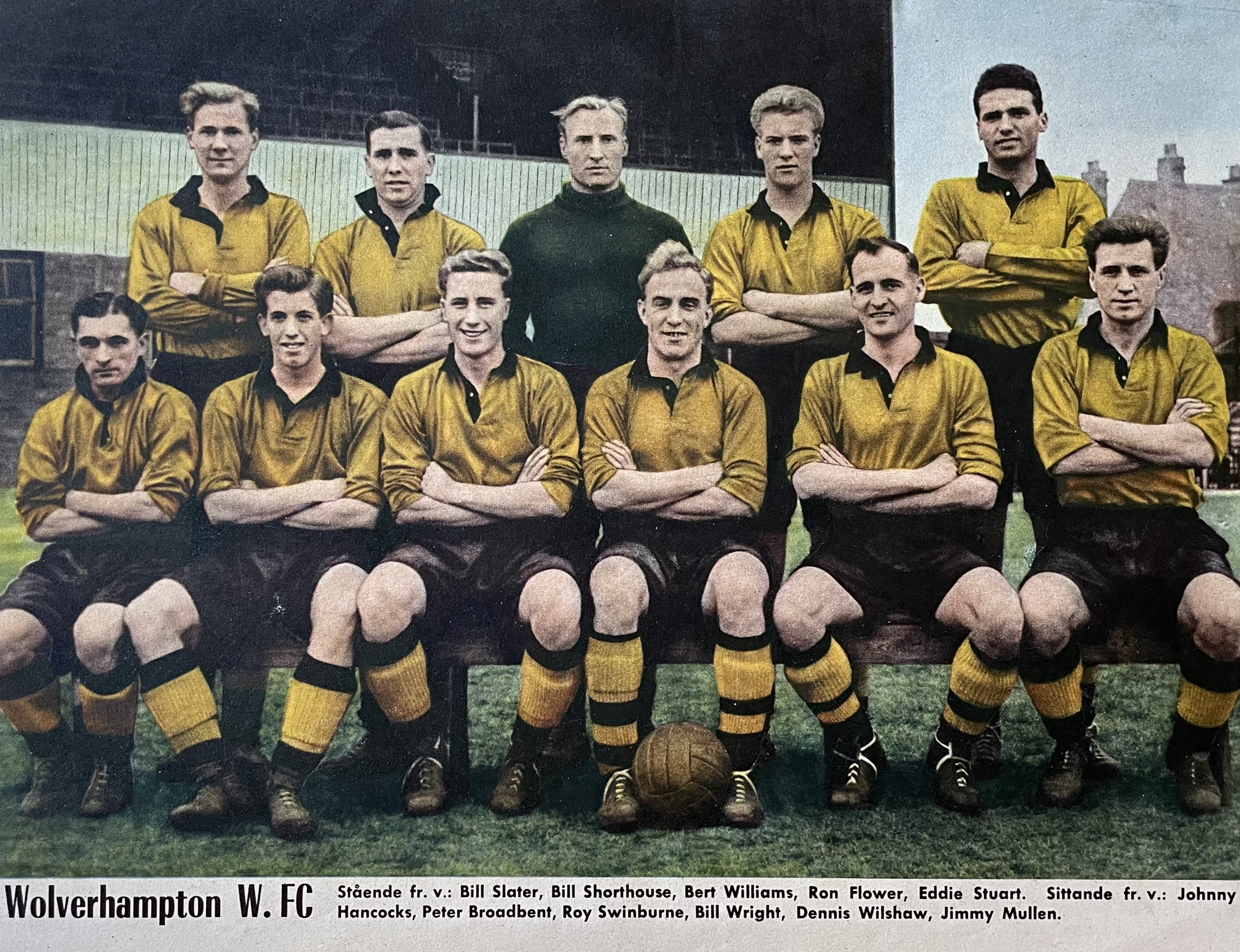
Wolverhampton Wanderers F.C. at 1955 with following players, standing from left: Bill Slater, Bill Shorthouse, Bert Williams, Ron Flowers, Eddie Stuart; front row: Johnny Hancocks, Peter Broadbent, Roy Swinbourne, Billy Wright (captain), Dennis Wilshaw and Jimmy Mullen.

William Henry Shorthouse (27 May 1922 – 6 September 2008) was an English professional football player and coach, who spent his playing career with Wolverhampton Wanderers.

== Career ==
Born in Bilston, Staffordshire, Shorthouse attended St Martin's School in nearby Bradley. He served in the Royal Engineers in the Second World War, and was wounded in the arm during the Normandy landings. He had joined Wolverhampton Wanderers as an amateur in 1941; his senior debut came on 23 August 1947 in a 4–3 First Division defeat at Manchester City.

He played as a defender, first at centre-half until replaced by Billy Wright, then at full-back. He was part of the club's 1949 FA Cup-winning team and was a near ever-present as the club won their first league championship in the 1953–54 season.

The defender remained a first choice player at Molineux until retiring in late 1956. In total, he played 376 senior games for the club – putting him among the club's top 20 appearance makers – before launching a career in coaching.

Shorthouse went on to coach at Birmingham City, and he and chief scout Don Dorman acted as caretaker managers at the end of the 1969–70 season while the club sought a replacement after Stan Cullis, Shorthouse's former manager at Wolves, retired. He also briefly coached the England youth team during the following season and later worked as a youth team coach at Aston Villa, guiding them to victory in the 1980 FA Youth Cup.

Known as "The Baron" to his teammates, he died in a Wolverhampton nursing home on 6 September 2008 at the age of 86. He had been suffering from dementia.

== Honours ==
Wolverhampton Wanderers

- Football League First Division: 1953–54
- FA Cup: 1948–49
- FA Charity Shield: 1949 (shared)
