= Paul Cooper (footballer, born 1953) =

English footballer

Personal information
- Full name: Paul David Cooper
- Date of birth: 21 December 1953 (age 72)
- Place of birth: Cannock, England
- Height: 5 ft 11 in (1.80 m)
- Position: Goalkeeper

Youth career
- Boney Hay Juniors
- Cannock Athletic

Senior career*
Years	Team	Apps	(Gls)
1970–1971	Sutton Coldfield Town	8	(0)
1971–1974	Birmingham City	17	(0)
1974	→ Ipswich Town (loan)	1	(0)
1974–1987	Ipswich Town	446	(0)
1987–1989	Leicester City	56	(0)
1989–1990	Manchester City	15	(0)
1990–1991	Stockport County	22	(0)
Total		565	(0)
- * Club domestic league appearances and goals

Paul David Cooper (born 21 December 1953) is an English former professional footballer who played as a goalkeeper. He made more than 500 appearances in the Football League, most of them for Ipswich Town, where he won the 1978 FA Cup and the 1981 UEFA Cup and also gained a reputation for saving penalties. With 575 appearances for Ipswich, he is ranked fourth in the club's all-time appearances list.

== Playing career ==
=== Birmingham City ===
Cooper was born in Cannock, Staffordshire; his father ran a pub in Brierley Hill. Initially a striker, he had trials at Shrewsbury Town before becoming a goalkeeper. He played for Staffs County Boys, Boney Hay Juniors and Cannock Athletic and went on to join Sutton Coldfield Town, who were playing in the Midland Combination. He made his debut for Sutton Coldfield on 15 August 1970 in a Midland Combination match against Evesham United and went on to play eight league matches and five cup games before signing for Second Division Birmingham City as an apprentice in June 1971. The following month he was given a professional contract. After first team goalkeeper Dave Latchford broke his finger in a match against Bristol City, Cooper made his Birmingham debut on 8 January 1972 against Portsmouth. Although he conceded three goals, Birmingham still won 6–3 and Cooper then kept five clean sheets in the next six matches. Latchford was subsequently recalled during the Easter period, but was dropped after losing form and Cooper brought back into the team for a crunch promotion match against Millwall on 8 April. Cooper kept his place in the team for the club's FA Cup semi-final defeat the following weekend against Leeds United, and played every match until the end of the season as Birmingham finished second, earning promotion to Division One. Cooper was only on the losing side in one match (the FA Cup semi-defeat) and kept seven clean sheets in his 12 league matches.

Cooper started the 1972–73 season as first choice, but after conceding six goals in his first three matches, he lost his place to Mike Kelly. At the start of the 1973–74 season Latchford was first choice again, but after conceding eight goals in four games, Cooper returned to the first team. However, he conceded seven goals in his two matches and was replaced by Latchford. Birmingham then signed Leeds goalkeeper Gary Sprake for £100,000, a world record for a goalkeeper, pushing Cooper further down the order. After failing to make another appearance, Ipswich manager Bobby Robson signed Cooper on loan in March 1974.

=== Ipswich Town ===
Cooper initially played in the reserves, making his debut against Arsenal reserves on 16 March. After four more matches in the reserves, he made his Ipswich first team debut on 20 April in a 3–2 defeat at Leeds United, Ipswich's penultimate game of the season. First team goalkeeper Laurie Sivell returned for Ipswich's final league match of the season, but Cooper was signed on a permanent contract in June 1974 for a fee of £23,000. Sivell continued as the club's main goalkeeper for the 1974–75 season, with Cooper making only two appearances in the league, one of which was against former club Birmingham. He spent most of the season in the reserves, where he and the club's other reserve goalkeeper David McKellar played 20 matches each.

The 1975–76 season saw Cooper make his breakthrough. After Ipswich lost their first league match 3–0 at home to Newcastle United, Cooper replaced Sivell in the team and went on to play in 40 of Ipswich's 42 league matches that season. He made his debut in European football on 17 September 1975 as Ipswich won 2–1 at Feyenoord and continued as first choice goalkeeper in 1976–77, making 34 league appearances as Ipswich finished third in the league, with Sivell deputising for the remaining eight games. At the end of the season Robson attempted to sign Tottenham goalkeeper Pat Jennings, but an injury to Trevor Whymark meant he was forced to sign an outfield player instead. In 1977–78 Cooper played in 40 of the club's 42 league matches, and although Ipswich had their worst season in the league since 1970–71, finishing eighteenth, they reached the FA Cup final for the first time in their history. Cooper missed the league match a week before the final with a back injury and was replaced by Paul Overton, who, in his only appearance for Ipswich, conceded six goals as Town lost 6–1 to Aston Villa. Cooper returned for the final and kept a clean sheet as Ipswich won 1–0, the club's first major honour since winning the First Division in 1961–62. At the time Cooper was developing a reputation for saving penalties; the following season he played in all but one of Ipswich's league games, saving five of the seven penalties he faced. He made 40 league appearances in 1979–80 (with Sivell playing in the other two games), saving eight of out of ten penalties, the most ever saved by a goalkeeper in a season. Cooper had studied the technique of the best penalty takers, analysing the likely direction and power of the shot. At the time goalkeepers could not move their feet before the ball was struck, but he attempted to distract penalty takers by waving his arms and leaning to one side, a technique David James later copied.

In 1980–81 Cooper made 61 appearances as Ipswich reached the League Cup fourth round, the semi-finals of the FA Cup and the final of the UEFA Cup, in which they defeated AZ Alkmaar 5–4 on aggregate to win the club's first European trophy. However, they missed out on the league title after losing seven of their last ten matches, something that Cooper has said is the only disappointment of his career. At the end of the 1980–81 season Cooper was named Player of the Year by Ipswich supporters. During this time, Cooper was the only regular first team member at Ipswich not to play for his country, although he was considered unlucky not to do so, facing competition from Peter Shilton and Ray Clemence. In 1981, he was also one of several Ipswich players to appear in the film Escape to Victory, with Cooper used as a stand-in for Sylvester Stallone, whose character played in goal. The following season saw Ipswich finish as league runners-up for a second consecutive season, although Cooper missed 10 league games, Sivell playing in nine and John Jackson making his only Ipswich appearance in the other.

After Robson left to manage England in 1982, his assistant Bobby Ferguson took over as manager. Ipswich finished only ninth in 1982–83, with Cooper playing in 35 league matches and Sivell in the remaining seven. He made 36 league appearances in 1983–84 as Ipswich finished twelfth; Sivell, in his final season at Ipswich, played in the other six games. Cooper played 36 league games again the following season, with Ipswich slumping to seventeenth as the 1981 team began to break up. Mark Grew, a £60,000 signing in March 1984, played the remaining six matches. In 1985–86 Cooper was still first choice goalkeeper, with Grew going out on loan and Jon Hallworth standing in for Cooper in six league games. Ipswich were relegated to Division Two at the end of the season, but Cooper stayed at the club and made 36 league appearances as the club qualified for the promotion playoffs in their first season in Division Two. Cooper saved a penalty in the first leg against Charlton as the match ended 0–0, but Ipswich lost 2–1 in the away leg. One of the last members of the Robson-era team still at the club, he left Ipswich on a free transfer in June 1987 and signed for Second Division Leicester City, who were managed by former Ipswich teammate Bryan Hamilton. Hallworth became Ipswich's first choice goalkeeper for the 1987–88 season.

=== Leicester City ===
Cooper made his Leicester debut on 12 September 1987 in a 2–1 defeat at Crystal Palace, having replaced Ian Andrews in the team after Leicester lost four of their first five matches of the season. He went on to make 39 appearances in his first season for Leicester as they finished thirteenth in the division. The season saw him save his 59th penalty during a Full Members Cup match against Stoke City. Although Martin Hodge was bought to replace him, injury meant that Cooper remained first choice goalkeeper for the first half of the 1988–89 season, playing until mid-January. However, when Hodge recovered, Cooper was allowed to leave; he did not play for Leicester again after a 2–1 win at home to Portsmouth on 14 January, and subsequently signed for Second Division rivals Manchester City for £20,000 on the March 1989 transfer deadline day to serve as backup to Andy Dibble.

=== Manchester City ===
Dibble suffered an injury in the next match, meaning Cooper made his City debut in a 2–1 win against Stoke on 27 March. He went on to make seven more appearances as the club finished as Second Division runners-up, earning promotion to the First Division. Although Dibble was in goal for the first two matches of the following season, he then suffered a back injury that kept him out for six weeks. Cooper came into the team, but only kept his place for nine matches, his final appearance for Manchester City and in the top division being a 4–0 defeat at Arsenal on 14 October 1989, although he remained at the club until the following summer, when they signed another goalkeeper, Tony Coton.

=== Stockport County ===
Cooper joined Fourth Division Stockport County in August 1990, and made his debut on 25 August against Halifax Town in a 0–0 draw. He played 25 more matches before making his final appearance on 2 February in a 1–0 defeat to Carlisle United, after which he retired due to injury.

== Post-football ==
After retiring from football, Cooper worked for a company selling nuts and bolts. He married his second wife, Sue, in 1991, with whom he had a daughter. He did some scouting in north-west England for Ipswich manager and former teammate George Burley, before moving to Tenerife where he runs a golf business. In 2014, he was inducted into the Ipswich Town Hall of Fame.

== Career statistics ==
Club	Season	Division	League		FA Cup		League Cup		Europe		Other		Total	
Club	Season	Division	Apps	Goals	Apps	Goals	Apps	Goals	Apps	Goals	Apps	Goals	Apps	Goals
Birmingham City	1971–72	Second Division	12	0	4	0	0	0	0	0	3	0	19	0
Birmingham City	1972–73	First Division	3	0	0	0	1	0	0	0	0	0	4	0
Birmingham City	1973–74	First Division	2	0	0	0	0	0	0	0	1	0	3	0
Ipswich Town	1973–74	First Division	1	0	0	0	0	0	0	0	0	0	1	0
Ipswich Town	1974–75	First Division	2	0	0	0	0	0	0	0	0	0	2	0
Ipswich Town	1975–76	First Division	40	0	3	0	1	0	4	0	0	0	48	0
Ipswich Town	1976–77	First Division	34	0	3	0	1	0	0	0	0	0	38	0
Ipswich Town	1977–78	First Division	40	0	7	0	3	0	6	0	0	0	56	0
Ipswich Town	1978–79	First Division	41	0	5	0	1	0	6	0	1	0	54	0
Ipswich Town	1979–80	First Division	40	0	4	0	2	0	4	0	0	0	50	0
Ipswich Town	1980–81	First Division	38	0	7	0	5	0	11	0	0	0	61	0
Ipswich Town	1981–82	First Division	32	0	3	0	8	0	2	0	0	0	45	0
Ipswich Town	1982–83	First Division	35	0	2	0	1	0	1	0	0	0	39	0
Ipswich Town	1983–84	First Division	36	0	1	0	4	0	0	0	0	0	41	0
Ipswich Town	1984–85	First Division	36	0	4	0	9	0	0	0	0	0	49	0
Ipswich Town	1985–86	First Division	36	0	5	0	5	0	0	0	0	0	46	0
Ipswich Town	1986–87	Second Division	36	0	1	0	3	0	0	0	5	0	45	0
Leicester City	1987–88	Second Division	32	0	0	0	4	0	0	0	3	0	39	0
Leicester City	1988–89	Second Division	24	0	1	0	5	0	0	0	1	0	31	0
Manchester City	1988–89	Second Division	8	0	0	0	0	0	0	0	0	0	8	0
Manchester City	1989–90	First Division	7	0	0	0	2	0	0	0	0	0	9	0
Stockport County	1990–91	Fourth Division	22	0	1	0	2	0	0	0	2	0	27	0
Total			557	0	51	0	57	0	34	0	16	0	715	0
Source: Pride of Anglia, Neil Brown, Foxes Talk, Blue Moon, Go Go Go County

== Honours ==
Ipswich Town

- FA Cup: 1977–78
- UEFA Cup: 1980–81

Individual

- Ipswich Town Player of the Year: 1980–81
- Ipswich Town Hall of Fame: Inducted 2014
