= Archie Styles =

English footballer

Personal information
- Full name: Arthur Styles
- Date of birth: 3 September 1949 (age 77)
- Place of birth: Liverpool, England
- Position: Left back

Youth career
- 1965–1967: Everton

Senior career*
Years	Team	Apps	(Gls)
1967–1974	Everton	23	(0)
1974–1978	Birmingham City	74	(4)
1978–1979	Peterborough United	32	(1)
1979–1980	Portsmouth	28	(0)
Total		157	(5)
- * Club domestic league appearances and goals

Arthur Styles (born 3 September 1949), known as Archie Styles, is an English former professional footballer who played as a left back. He made more than 150 appearances in the Football League for several clubs.

Styles was born in Liverpool, and joined home-town club Everton on leaving school in 1965. He won representative honours for England at schoolboy and youth level. He was unable to make himself a regular part of Everton's first team, making only 23 league appearances in seven years at the club. In February 1974, together with Howard Kendall, he moved from Everton to Birmingham City in part-exchange for Bob Latchford, the whole deal valuing Latchford at £350,000 which was at the time a British transfer record. At Birmingham, facing competition from Garry Pendrey and others, he failed to establish himself as first choice at left back. In 1978, he moved to Peterborough United where he spent one season, followed by one season at Portsmouth, after which he joined the coaching staff at the club.
