= Phil Summerill =

English footballer (1947–2026)

Personal information
- Full name: Philip Ernest Summerill
- Date of birth: 20 November 1947
- Place of birth: Birmingham, England
- Date of death: 9 March 2026 (aged 78)
- Height: 5 ft 10 1/4 in (1.78 m)
- Position: Striker

Youth career
- 1963–1964: Birmingham City

Senior career*
Years	Team	Apps	(Gls)
1964–1973	Birmingham City	118	(46)
1973–1974	Huddersfield Town	54	(11)
1974–1977	Millwall	87	(20)
1977–1979	Wimbledon	31	(4)
- * Club domestic league appearances and goals

Philip Ernest Summerill (20 November 1947 – 9 March 2026) was an English professional footballer who played as a striker in the Football League for Birmingham City, Huddersfield Town, Millwall and Wimbledon.

Summerill was born in Erdington, Birmingham. He spent the major part of his professional career at Birmingham City, whom he joined from school. He was their leading scorer for three successive seasons from 1968–69 to 1970–71, and contributed to their promotion to the Football League First Division in 1972. He went on to play League football for Huddersfield Town, Millwall and Wimbledon, and for several more years in non-League football. He later worked for Birmingham City Council in football development and coaching.

Summerill died on 9 March 2026, at the age of 78.

== Honours ==
Birmingham City

- Second Division promotion: 1972

Wimbledon

- Fourth Division promotion: 1979
