= Trevor Hockey =

Welsh footballer and manager

Personal information
- Date of birth: 1 May 1943
- Place of birth: Keighley, West Riding of Yorkshire, England
- Date of death: 2 April 1987 (aged 43)
- Place of death: Keighley, England
- Positions: Midfielder; outside right

Senior career*
| Years | Team | Apps | (Gls) |
| 1960–1961 | Bradford City | 53 | (5) |
| 1961–1963 | Nottingham Forest | 73 | (6) |
| 1963–1965 | Newcastle United | 52 | (3) |
| 1965–1971 | Birmingham City | 196 | (8) |
| 1971–1973 | Sheffield United | 68 | (4) |
| 1973 | Norwich City | 13 | (0) |
| 1973–1974 | Aston Villa | 24 | (1) |
| 1974–1976 | Bradford City | 44 | (1) |
| 1976 | Athlone Town | 9 | (0) |
| 1976 | San Diego Jaws | 22 | (0) |
| 1977 | Las Vegas Quicksilvers | 15 | (0) |
| 1977 | San Jose Earthquakes | 5 | (0) |
| 1977–1978 | Ashton United | 4 | (0) |
| Total | | 578 | (28) |

International career
| 1971–1973 | Wales | 9 | (1) |

Managerial career
- 1976: Athlone Town
- San Diego Jaws
- Stalybridge Celtic
- San Jose Earthquakes
- Las Vegas Quicksilvers
- 1981: Keighley Town
- * Club domestic league appearances and goals

Trevor Hockey (1 May 1943 – 2 April 1987) was a British professional footballer. His professional career spanned 16 years, seven clubs and almost 600 appearances, plus nine international caps for Wales.

== Playing career ==
Born in Keighley, Hockey turned professional with Bradford City in May 1960. Hockey had been discovered by the club in the local amateur ranks. Made his debut for Bradford City when aged 17. Attracted interest soon after his debut. He left Valley Parade for Nottingham Forest in November 1961, but after just two years at the City Ground, Hockey was on the move again, this time to Newcastle United where he collected a Second Division winners medal in 1965.

Now transformed from a winger into a central midfielder, Hockey joined Birmingham City in November 1965 in a £25,000 deal. He went on to make 231 appearances for the Blues scoring 13 goals, and won the club's Player of the Year award in 1969. He was also the club captain when he was transferred to Sheffield United for £40,000 in January 1971.

He made his debut in a 2–1 away victory against Oxford United and, following instructions "to battle, to win the ball, and give it to Currie" he instantly became a Bramall Lane cult figure on the pitch with his beatle-style haircut, beard and tough tackling. He played a large part in ensuring that United was promoted that year, including the scoring first goal in a 2–0 win, against Millwall on 13 April, sat down after colliding with the goalkeeper.

His United career virtually ended with a broken leg against Manchester City on 12 February 1972. Struggling to regain his place in the first team, he made his final appearance on 30 December 1972 before Norwich City secured his services in February 1973, swapping him for Scottish striker Jimmy Bone.

However, after just six months with the Canaries, Hockey was back playing his football in Birmingham, this time for Aston Villa. He made his Villa debut on 25 Aug 1973 in a 2-0 home victory against Preston North End.

After just a year at Villa Park he was on the move again, this time returning to his first club Bradford City. Hockey drifted into semi-professional football after leaving Bradford and played four Cheshire League games for Ashton United during the 1977–78 season.

== Managerial career ==
In March 1976, Hockey became player-manager at Athlone Town before taking his footballing talents across the pond and a spell with San Diego Jaws in the North American Soccer League. Hockey returned to England the following year and took on the managers role at non-league Stalybridge Celtic before another spell in the States as coach with both San Jose Earthquakes and Las Vegas Quicksilvers.

In 1981, he returned home to reform Keighley Town, a side that had played in the old Yorkshire League after the Second World War. Hockey's intention was to guide Keighley Town into the Northern Premier League by the end of the decade. Based at Utley, Town were accepted into the West Riding County Amateur league's first division. Keighley won the league in their first season back. However, their ground was deemed not acceptable for the league's premier division. Town defeated Shamrocks 3–1 in the Keighley FA Cup final, before going on to beat Silsden 2–0 in the revived Keighley Charity Cup final at the end of the season. In the years that followed, Town would win the County Amateur league premier title, and would be joined by Silsden in that league, yet by the end of the decade Keighley Town would again be defunct. This occurred at the same time as Hockey's death.

== Music career ==
While a player with Birmingham City, he was persuaded to take on a singing role to promote the club. In 1968 he provided the vocals for the song "Happy 'Cos I'm Blue" released as a single on the Beau Brummie Promotions label, the B-side was "Keep Right on to the End of the Road" by The Blues Players.

== Death ==
He died of a heart attack shortly after taking part in a five-a-side tournament in Keighley on 2 April 1987, aged 43.

== Career statistics ==
=== International goals ===
| # | Date | Venue | Opponent | Score | Result | Competition |
|---|---|---|---|---|---|---|
| 1. | 28 March 1973 | Ninian Park, Cardiff, Wales | Poland | 2–0 | Win | 1974 WC qualification |
Correct as of 7 October 2015
