= Mick Darrell =

English footballer

Personal information
- Full name: Michael Alan Darrell
- Date of birth: 14 January 1947 (age 79)
- Place of birth: Bilston, England
- Position: Midfielder

Youth career
- 1962–1965: Birmingham City

Senior career*
Years	Team	Apps	(Gls)
1965–1971	Birmingham City	16	(2)
1970	→ Newport County (loan)	8	(0)
1970–1971	→ Gillingham (loan)	21	(1)
1971–1973	Peterborough United	42	(6)
1973–1974	Bilston		
1974–19??	Darlaston		
- * Club domestic league appearances and goals

Michael Alan Darrell (born 14 January 1947), commonly known as Mick or Mike Darrell, is an English former professional footballer who made more than 100 appearances in the Football League playing for Birmingham City, Newport County, Gillingham and Peterborough United. He played as a midfielder.

Darrell was born in Bilston, Staffordshire. When he left school in 1962 he joined Birmingham City as an apprentice, turning professional two and a half years later. He made his debut as an 18-year-old, scoring in a 5–1 defeat at Bury in the Second Division on 16 October 1965. He started the next five games, in the absence of Geoff Vowden and Malcolm Beard, but over the next five years he appeared only occasionally for Birmingham, mainly as substitute, and spent periods on loan at Newport County and Gillingham. In 1971 Darrell joined Peterborough United of the Fourth Division. After 42 league games he returned to the Black Country to play for Bilston and Darlaston in the West Midlands (Regional) League.
