= Alan Whitehead (footballer, born 1951) =

English footballer

Personal information
- Full name: Alan John Whitehead
- Date of birth: 3 September 1951 (age 75)
- Place of birth: Birmingham, England
- Position: Central defender

Youth career
- 1967–1969: Birmingham City

Senior career*
| Years | Team | Apps | (Gls) |
| 1969–1974 | Birmingham City | 4 | (0) |
| 1974–1976 | KV Mechelen | 13 | (0) |
- * Club domestic league appearances and goals

Alan John Whitehead (born 3 September 1951) is an English former professional footballer who played in the Football League for Birmingham City.

== Biography ==
Whitehead was born in the Bordesley Green district of Birmingham. When he left school in 1967, he joined Birmingham City as an apprentice, and turned professional two years later. As a junior, he played on the wing, but became most comfortable in central defence.

He made his first-team debut in the Anglo-Italian Tournament in 1971, and played his part in Birmingham's promotion to the First Division in the 1971–72 season. Having made his Football League debut on 22 April 1972 in a 1–1 draw at home to Middlesbrough, he stood in for the injured Stan Harland in the last two games of that season, both away from home, both of which Birmingham needed to – and did – win. He played only once in the top flight, and joined KV Mechelen in 1974.

Whitehead's brother Clive was also a professional footballer who had a long Football League career with clubs including Bristol City and West Bromwich Albion.
