= Jimmy Calderwood =

Scottish footballer and manager (1955–2025)

Personal information
- Full name: James Calderwood
- Date of birth: 28 February 1955
- Place of birth: Glasgow, Scotland
- Date of death: 19 January 2025 (aged 69)
- Height: 5 ft 9 in (1.75 m)
- Position: Midfielder

Youth career
- Glasgow Amateurs
- 1971–1972: Birmingham City

Senior career*
Years	Team	Apps	(Gls)
1972–1980	Birmingham City	145	(4)
1979–1980	→ Cambridge United (loan)	8	(0)
1980	→ Sparta Rotterdam (loan)	10	(0)
1980–1982	Willem II Tilburg	44	(1)
1982–1987	Roda JC	124	(1)
1987–1989	Heracles Almelo	33	(7)

International career
1974	Scotland U23	1	(0)

Managerial career
- 1996–1997: Willem II Tilburg
- 1997–1999: NEC Nijmegen
- 1999–2004: Dunfermline Athletic
- 2004–2009: Aberdeen
- 2010: Kilmarnock
- 2011: Ross County
- 2012: Go Ahead Eagles
- 2014: De Graafschap
- * Club domestic league appearances and goals

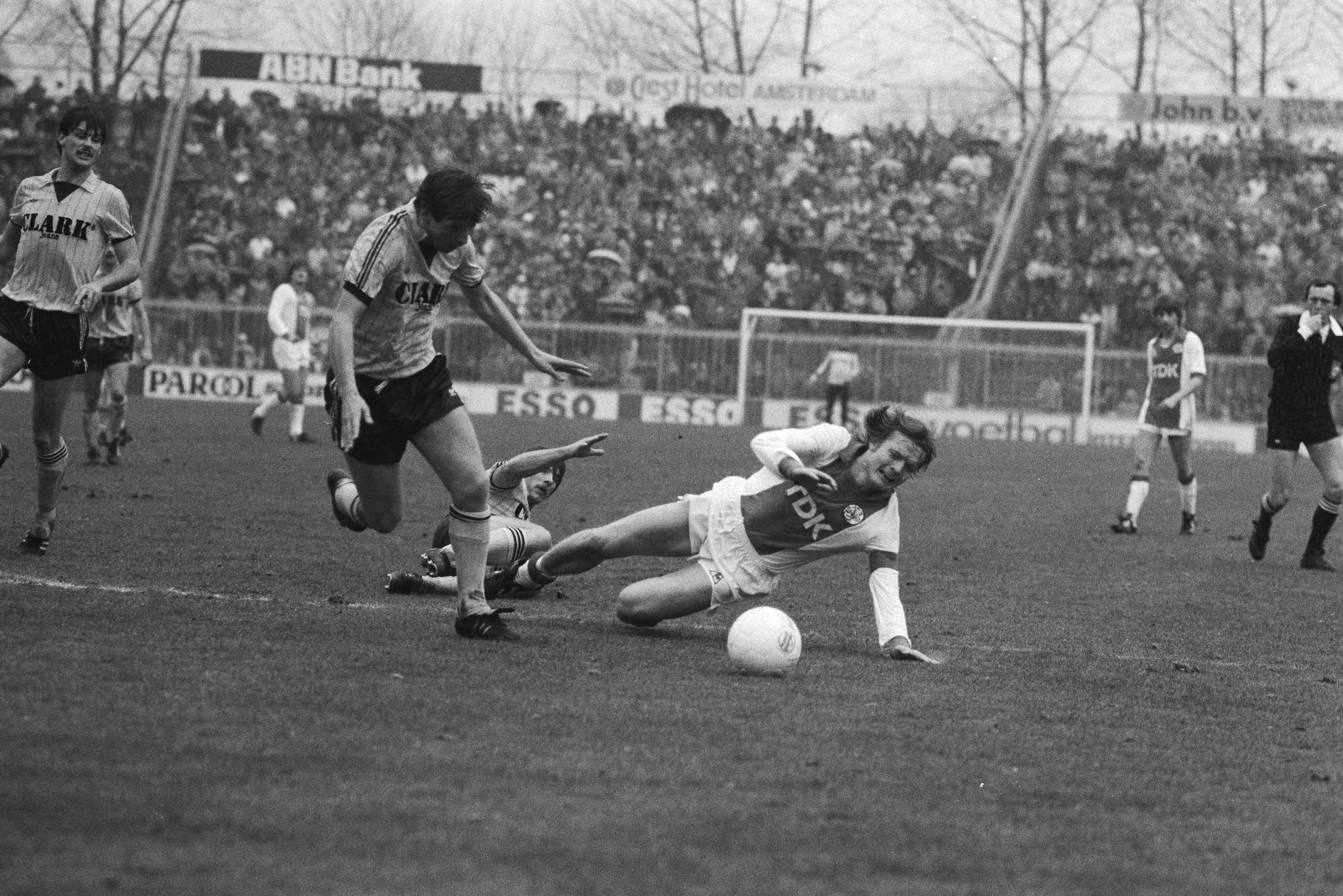
Ajax against Roda JC 3 - 0; Sören Lerby (right) is taken down by Roda players Eugène Hanssen (left) and Jimmy Calderwood (middle). The match took place on 4 April 1983 in Amsterdam

James Calderwood (28 February 1955 – 19 January 2025) was a Scottish football player and manager. Calderwood played for Birmingham City and Dutch clubs Sparta Rotterdam, Willem II Tilburg, Roda JC and Heracles Almelo. After retiring as a player, Calderwood stayed in the Netherlands and became a coach, becoming a manager of Willem II Tilburg and NEC Nijmegen.

Calderwood returned to his native Scotland in 1999 to become manager of Dunfermline Athletic, guiding them to the 2004 Scottish Cup Final. Calderwood left Dunfermline that summer to become manager of Aberdeen, a position he held for five seasons. Aberdeen performed relatively well in the SPL under Calderwood and reached the last 32 of the 2007–08 UEFA Cup, but suffered a number of domestic cup defeats by lower league opponents. He then had brief stints with Kilmarnock and Ross County, helping each club retain their league status. Calderwood returned to the Netherlands in March 2012, with Go Ahead Eagles.

In January 2014, Calderwood spent just under a month as manager of De Graafschap before resigning. Calderwood cited the sale of several of De Graafschap's key players without adequate replacement as the reason for his resignation from the post. In July 2016, Calderwood was appointed to the board of directors at Cowdenbeath.

In August 2017, Calderwood revealed that he had had earlier-onset dementia for the past two years and was being treated for the condition. He died on 19 January 2025. His funeral procession on 19 February 2025 passed right by Ibrox Park, home of Rangers F.C.

== Playing career ==
Born in Govan, Glasgow, Calderwood was raised in the Castlemilk housing scheme in the city. He played in youth teams with Ricky Sbragia who also became a footballer and later a manager, and also played at schoolboy level with future Scotland captain Willie Miller.

He started his professional career with Birmingham City as an apprentice in 1971, making his first team debut against Stoke City in 1972 (Sbragia joined him a year later). He made 159 appearances for the club before spending a couple of months on loan at Cambridge United in 1979 and early 1980 and at Dutch club Sparta Rotterdam from March 1980 to the end of the season. Calderwood chose to reject Birmingham's offer of a new contract, and he moved on to another Dutch club, Willem II, for a £50,000 fee. After two years with Willem II and a further six with Roda JC, Calderwood spent a short spell with Heracles Almelo before retiring in 1989.

== Managerial career ==
=== Netherlands ===
Calderwood first became a coach in 1991, of amateur club Rietvogels of Almelo. A year later he became an assistant coach of professional club FC Zwolle, before moving in 1993 to Cambuur Leeuwarden. He returned to Willem II Tilburg in 1995, initially as assistant coach before becoming the manager of the club a year later. A year later, he moved to the managerial position at NEC Nijmegen.

=== Dunfermline ===
After a two-year spell with NEC, Scottish First Division side Dunfermline Athletic moved to make him their new manager. Calderwood spent five seasons at East End Park, where he led the club to promotion to the SPL in his first season in charge. He also led them to their highest ever SPL position, finishing fourth in 2003–04. That season the side also reached the 2004 Scottish Cup Final, guaranteeing their return to European competition for the first time in 35 years as opponents Celtic had already earned Champions League qualification.

=== Aberdeen ===
In the summer of 2004 Willie Miller, returning to Pittodrie as director of football, brought Calderwood to Aberdeen to replace Steve Paterson as manager. Calderwood oversaw an improvement in Aberdeen's fortunes on the playing field. They narrowly missed out on qualifying for European competition in 2004–05 and 2005–06 but finished the 2006–07 league campaign in third place, ensuring UEFA Cup qualification. However, there was humiliation for his team when they were eliminated from the 2006–07 Scottish League Cup by the amateur club Queen's Park.

In December 2007, Calderwood led Aberdeen to the last 32 of European competition for the first time since 1986 with a surprising 4–0 demolition of FC Copenhagen at Pittodrie. With this great achievement, the Dons were rewarded by drawing FC Bayern Munich. Calderwood's team drew 2–2 with Bayern at Pittodrie on 14 February 2008, but the Germans pulled off a convincing 5–1 win the following week. Calderwood signed a 3 1/2-year contract to end a month of speculation about his future, along with assistant manager Jimmy Nicholl and coach Sandy Clark.

Calderwood took Aberdeen to the 2007–08 Scottish Cup semi final, where they lost 4–3 to Dumfries First Division side, Queen of the South. This was despite two goals and an assist from Barry Nicholson playing against his hometown club.

The 2008–09 season saw Calderwood come in for some stern criticism following the club's poor start to the campaign. The Dons failed to win any of their opening four home matches, and were beaten 4–2 by Kilmarnock in the League Cup. Fans became impatient with some claiming it was time for a fresh start just as the team recovered form and were in the race for third place. On 18 January 2009, Calderwood led Aberdeen to a memorable 4–2 victory over Celtic that propelled Aberdeen to third in the league. However, just three league wins followed in the next 16 and Calderwood left the club "by mutual consent" on 24 May 2009, after the team had qualified for a place in the UEFA Europa League with a 2–1 victory over Hibernian.

=== Kilmarnock ===
Calderwood was appointed manager of Kilmarnock on 14 January 2010, succeeding Jim Jefferies. He agreed to a contract with the club until the end of the 2009–10 season. Calderwood managed to secure Kilmarnock's SPL status for another season, but left the club in the summer after disagreeing with chairman Michael Johnston about the player and coaching budgets.

=== Ross County ===
On 16 February 2011, Calderwood agreed to fill the managerial post at First Division club Ross County until the end of the season.

=== Go Ahead Eagles ===
Calderwood was appointed coach of Go Ahead Eagles in the Eerste Divisie on 30 March 2012. He left the Deventer club after they were knocked out of the promotion play-offs by FC Den Bosch after the second leg of their double-header on 13 May.

=== De Graafschap ===
Calderwood was appointed manager of De Graafschap in January 2014. He left the club after less than a month in the job, furious at the sale of two key players before the start of the season. His decision to quit was not well received by the players, with club captain Edwin Linssen saying: "When we were told, we were very depressed. It's not good, it's a sad day for the club."

== Personal life and death ==
In a 1978 pen picture in Shoot! magazine, the then 22-year-old Calderwood named Eddie Gray as his favourite player, Rangers as his favourite team, and Trevor Brooking as the toughest opponent he had faced. His most memorable match was his Birmingham City debut, against Stoke City in November 1972, his "biggest thrill" was being picked to represent his country at under-23 level, and he had been disappointed to be dropped for the 1975 FA Cup semi-finals against Fulham. Apart from his father, he cited former Birmingham coach Willie Bell as having had the greatest influence on his career. Away from football, he enjoyed snooker, golf and badminton and named Neil Diamond and Diana Ross as his favourite singers.

Calderwood died from complications of dementia on 19 January 2025, at the age of 69. His funeral procession one month later was driven past Rangers stadium Ibrox Park.

== Managerial statistics ==
Team	From	To	Record				
Team	From	To	G	W	D	L	Win %
Willem II Tilburg	1996	1997					
NEC Nijmegen	1997	1999					
Dunfermline Athletic	30 November 1999	28 May 2004	202	77	47	78	38.12
Aberdeen	28 May 2004	24 May 2009	227	94	60	73	41.41
Kilmarnock	11 January 2010	31 May 2010	23	7	4	12	30.43
Ross County	17 February 2011	7 May 2011	17	7	6	4	41.18
Go Ahead Eagles	30 March 2012	13 May 2012	7	4	2	1	57.14

== Honours ==
=== As a player ===
Dunfermline Athletic

- Fife Cup: 2000–01, 2002–03
- Scottish First Division promotion: 1999–2000

=== As a manager ===
Ross County

- Scottish Challenge Cup: 2010–11
- SPL Manager of the Month: March 2002, April 2004, August 2004, February 2006, April 2006
