= John Sleeuwenhoek =

English footballer

Personal information
- Full name: John Cornelius Sleeuwenhoek
- Date of birth: 26 February 1944
- Place of birth: Wednesfield, England
- Date of death: 20 June 1989 (aged 45)
- Place of death: Birmingham, England
- Position: Centre half

Youth career
- 1959–1961: Aston Villa

Senior career*
Years	Team	Apps	(Gls)
1961–1967	Aston Villa	226	(1)
1967–1971	Birmingham City	30	(0)
1971	→ Torquay United (loan)	11	(0)
1971–1972	Oldham Athletic	2	(0)

International career
1962–1963	England U23	2	(0)
- * Club domestic league appearances and goals

John Cornelius Sleeuwenhoek (26 February 1944 – 20 July 1989) was an English professional footballer who played as a centre half. He made 269 appearances in the Football League, mainly for Aston Villa, and was capped twice for England U23.

Sleeuwenhoek was born in Wednesfield, Staffordshire, the son of a Dutch paratrooper. He started his football career as a junior with Aston Villa, turning professional in 1961, and played regularly for the club for six seasons. While at the club he won two caps for England at under-23 level, and also played for a representative Football League XI. He then moved to Birmingham City, but recurrent knee problems dogged his later career. After spells at Torquay United and Oldham Athletic he retired from professional football at the early age of 28.

He was affectionately known as 'Tulip' due to his Dutch roots.

He died in Birmingham in July 1989, aged 45.

== Honours ==
Aston Villa

- Football League Cup runner-up: 1962–63
