= George Smith (footballer, born 1945) =

English footballer

Personal information
- Full name: George Smith
- Date of birth: 7 October 1945 (age 81)
- Place of birth: Newcastle upon Tyne, England
- Position: Midfielder

Youth career
- Newcastle United

Senior career*
Years	Team	Apps	(Gls)
1963–1965	Newcastle United	0	(0)
1965–1967	Barrow	92	(11)
1967–1969	Portsmouth	64	(3)
1969–1971	Middlesbrough	74	(0)
1971–1973	Birmingham City	39	(0)
1973–1975	Cardiff City	45	(1)
1975–1977	Swansea City	88	(8)
1977–1980	Hartlepool United	85	(2)
- * Club domestic league appearances and goals

George Smith (born 7 October 1945) is an English former professional football midfielder.

Smith began his career with his local club Newcastle United although he failed to make the first team and left in March 1965 to join Barrow. He went on to play for Portsmouth, Middlesbrough, Birmingham City, Cardiff City and Swansea City, where he became a central figure in the club's growth, before finishing his career at Hartlepool United. Following his retirement as a player Smith joined the Hartlepool coaching staff. Later he became a scout for Stoke City.
