= Keith Bowker =

English footballer and manager

Personal information
- Full name: Keith Bowker
- Date of birth: 18 April 1951 (age 75)
- Place of birth: West Bromwich, England
- Position: Striker

Youth career
- 196?–1968: Birmingham City

Senior career*
Years	Team	Apps	(Gls)
1968–1973	Birmingham City	21	(5)
1973–1976	Exeter City	110	(38)
1976–1977	Cambridge United	17	(1)
1976–1977	Northampton Town (loan)	4	(0)
1977–1980	Exeter City	102	(28)
1980–1982	Torquay United	53	(9)
- Bideford

Managerial career
- 1982–1986 & 1986–1991: Bideford Town A.F.C. & Taunton Town
- * Club domestic league appearances and goals

Keith Bowker (born 18 April 1951) is an English former professional footballer who played as a striker. He scored 81 goals from 307 appearances in the Football League.

Bowker began his career as an apprentice at Birmingham City, turning professional in August 1968, though he had to wait over two years for his league debut. He found it impossible to establish himself at St Andrew's and in December 1973, after five goals in 21 league games, moved to Exeter City.

Bowker played and scored regularly at Exeter; in two-and-a-half seasons he hit 38 goals in 110 league games. He moved to Cambridge United in May 1976 but found it difficult to win a regular place in the team. He moved to Northampton Town on loan in December 1976, playing four times in the league without scoring. On his return to Cambridge he continued to struggle, as the side stormed to promotion from the Fourth Division. He left the Abbey Stadium in August 1977, after scoring just one goal in 17 league games, to return to Exeter City. Once more he found a regular place in the Grecian's side, playing 102 times in the league over the next three seasons, scoring 28 goals. In August 1980 he signed for Torquay United, where he was to play 53 league games (scoring nine goals) before joining North Devon side Bideford. In 1986, he was appointed manager of Taunton Town, taking them to the Western League title in 1989–90. He left Taunton in 1993, and later worked as a postman.
