= Bob Hatton =

English footballer

Personal information
- Full name: Robert James Hatton
- Date of birth: 10 April 1947 (age 79)
- Place of birth: Hull, England
- Height: 5 ft 11 in (1.80 m)
- Position: Centre forward

Youth career
- 1962–1963: Wath Wanderers
- 1963–1964: Wolverhampton Wanderers

Senior career*
Years	Team	Apps	(Gls)
1964–1967	Wolverhampton Wanderers	10	(7)
1967–1968	Bolton Wanderers	24	(2)
1968–1969	Northampton Town	33	(7)
1969–1971	Carlisle United	93	(37)
1971–1976	Birmingham City	175	(58)
1976–1978	Blackpool	75	(32)
1978–1980	Luton Town	82	(29)
1980–1982	Sheffield United	95	(34)
1982–1983	Cardiff City	30	(9)
1983–1984	Dundalk	0	(0)
Total		617	(215)
- * Club domestic league appearances and goals

Robert James Hatton (born 10 April 1947) is an English former footballer who played as a centre forward. He played more than 600 matches in the Football League for a variety of clubs and scored at a rate better than one goal in every three matches.

== Career ==
Hatton was discovered by legendary scout, Mark Crook, who operated out of South Yorkshire for his former club, Wolves.

Wolverhampton Wanderers recognised his potential and invited him across to the Midlands for a trial period. His stay at Molineux was short as Bolton Wanderers stepped in with a definite contract offer, and Hatton realised that the chance of security was not one to be missed. From Bolton Wanderers he moved to Northampton Town, but never really settled in a struggling team. The inevitable drop to Division Four in the 1968–69 season could not be avoided and many of the squad were tempted by better offers, Hatton being one of them.

Carlisle United at the time were a steady, mid-table outfit and manager Bob Stokoe was always on the look-out for a sharp deal that could help to take the club onwards and upwards. He offered Northampton Town a reported £8,000 for Hatton early in July (though this figure may well have been higher) and signed Hatton on a two-year deal.

Hatton began his Carlisle United career playing alongside Hugh McIlmoyle, but was soon thrown in at the deep end when the Scot moved to Middlesbrough. His first two goals came against Hull City in a 2–1 win on 6 September 1969, and he went on to make 50 appearances, scoring 14 goals along the way. He finished as the club's top scorer.

In 1970–71 he made 46 appearances and scored 24 goals.

Hatton signed a new contract in the summer of 1970. What no-one had realised, though, was that it had a release clause included. After just 15 games of the 1971–72 season, Birmingham City made a successful bid of £80,000, a Carlisle club-record fee. He scored 9 more goals for Carlisle before his move, and notched a goal in the 2–0 away win in his final game for the club, at Luton Town on 23 October 1971.

Hatton played a major part in Birmingham City's promotion to the top flight in the 1971–72 season partnering Trevor Francis and Bob Latchford. Hatton scored the only goal in the 1975 FA Cup Quarter Final win over Middlesbrough in front of over 53,000 fans and played in Division One till 1976.

He joined Blackpool in 1976 for £60,000, and scored twice on his 21 August debut in a 4–1 victory over Bristol Rovers. While at Blackpool he was partnered up front with Mickey Walsh.

This was then followed by a move to Luton Town in the summer of 1978, where he spent two years, then a further two years with Sheffield United. Hatton's successful striking partnership with Keith Edwards was one of the main reasons why Sheffield United achieved promotion back up from the Fourth Division at the first attempt in 1981–82. Hatton had a one-year spell at Cardiff City, signed by Len Ashurst, before signing for John Dempsey at Dundalk in January 1984 for their upcoming FAI Cup campaign. However, despite making his debut in the Cup game on 5 February Dundalk were knocked out and so Hatton's career was at an end.

He has worked closely with the Professional Footballers' Association ever since, and has settled in the Midlands with occasional football guest appearances on BBC Radio WM in the 1990s.

== Honours ==
Sheffield United

- Football League Fourth Division: 1981–82
