= Gordon Taylor (footballer) =

English footballer, trade union leader (born 1944)

Gordon Taylor OBE
Personal information
- Full name: Gordon Alexander Taylor
- Date of birth: 28 December 1944 (age 81)
- Place of birth: Ashton-under-Lyne, England
- Height: 5 ft 6 in (1.68 m)
- Position: Winger

Youth career
- 1959–1960: Curzon Ashton
- 1960–1962: Bolton Wanderers

Senior career*
Years	Team	Apps	(Gls)
1962–1970	Bolton Wanderers	258	(41)
1970–1976	Birmingham City	166	(9)
1976–1978	Blackburn Rovers	64	(3)
1977	→ Vancouver Whitecaps (loan)	16	(1)
1978–1980	Bury	60	(2)
Total		564	(56)
- * Club domestic league appearances and goals

Gordon Alexander Taylor OBE (born 28 December 1944) is an English former professional footballer who played as a winger. He was chief executive of the English footballers' trades union, the Professional Footballers' Association, for over 40 years, between 1981 and 2021. In March 2019 it was reported that he was to stand aside upon completion of a "full and open review" into the PFA's finances (presented at its 2019 AGM) along with its entire management committee and chairman Ben Purkiss. He was reputed to be the highest paid union official in the world. The 2020 PFA AGM is scheduled for 26 November, and is expected to appoint four non-executive directors. In September 2020 the chair of the all party group on gambling, Carolyn Harris voiced her reservations on gambling related harm exampled by the Union's CEO. On the 1 June 2021, Taylor was formally replaced as CEO, retaining a temporary transitional advisory role to his successor.

Taylor was born in Ashton-under-Lyne, Lancashire. He played over 250 matches for Bolton Wanderers and scored more than 50 goals before being transferred to Birmingham City in 1970. He joined Blackburn Rovers in 1976 and spent the 1977 close season playing in the North American Soccer League for the Vancouver Whitecaps. He returned to play for Blackburn and finally Bury before retiring in 1980 to work full-time for the PFA.

Taylor earned a Bachelor of Science in economics from University of London in 1969 as an external student. In 2007, he was a member of FIFA's football committee. He is an alumnus of Manchester Metropolitan University.

He was appointed Officer of the Order of the British Empire (OBE) in the 2008 New Year Honours for services to sport.

His mobile phone messages were allegedly hacked by a private investigator employed by the News of the World newspaper. The Guardian reported that News International (the owner of the News of the World) paid Taylor £700,000 in legal costs and damages in exchange for a confidentiality agreement barring him from speaking about the case.
