= Alan Campbell (Scottish footballer) =

Scottish footballer (born 1948)

Personal information
- Full name: Alan James Campbell
- Date of birth: 21 January 1948 (age 78)
- Place of birth: Arbroath, Scotland
- Height: 5 ft 8 in (1.73 m)
- Position: Midfielder

Youth career
- Arbroath Lads' Club
- 1964–1965: Charlton Athletic

Senior career*
Years	Team	Apps	(Gls)
1965–1970	Charlton Athletic	198	(28)
1970–1976	Birmingham City	175	(11)
1976–1980	Cardiff City	167	(2)
1980–1982	Carlisle United	31	(2)
1982–1986	Redditch United		
1986–1989	Olton Royale		

International career
1970	Scotland U23	1	(0)

Managerial career
- 1989–1992: Highgate United (assistant manager)
- 1992: Highgate United
- 1992–1993: Stratford Town (assistant manager)
- 1993: Stratford Town
- * Club domestic league appearances and goals

Alan James Campbell (born 21 January 1948) is a Scottish former professional footballer who played as a central midfielder. He made 571 appearances in the English Football League for Charlton Athletic, Birmingham City, Cardiff City and Carlisle United, including over 100 in the First Division for Birmingham City. He was capped for Scotland at youth and under-23 level. He went on to play and manage in non-League football around the Birmingham area.

== Career ==
Born in Arbroath, Campbell began his career in England with Charlton Athletic, joining the club at the age of 15. The club were only able to sign Campbell on amateur terms, creating a fake job for him at a sporting goods store and paying his accommodation plus £5 a week. He initially suffered from homesickness in London, even returning to Scotland briefly after two weeks at the club, but soon settled and was part of the Charlton youth side that reached the semi-final of the FA Youth Cup. In 1965, Bob Stokoe was appointed manager of the club and handed Campbell his professional debut in the Second Division, on the opening day of the 1965–66 season in a 4–2 defeat to Bolton Wanderers, at the age of 17. He went on to play over 200 times for Charlton before joining Birmingham City in 1970.

Campbell spent six seasons at St Andrews, appearing in over 200 matches in all competitions, scoring 14 goals in the process. He was a midfield ever-present in the promotion winning side of 1971/72 in all competitions, (the only member of the squad to achieve this milestone) as Birmingham finished second in the old Division 2 to win promotion to Division 1 for the first time since 1965, reaching the FA Cup Semi-Final in the same season, only to lose 3–0 to eventual winners Leeds United F.C.

Campbell remained a key squad member for Birmingham for the next three seasons in Division 1, reaching a second FA Cup semi-final in 1974/75 narrowly missing out on a Wembley appearance as Birmingham were defeated 1-0 after a replay against Fulham F.C.

The following season 1975/76, after the departure of manager Freddie Goodwin (footballer, born 1944), Campbell struggled for selection, making his last appearance in an FA Cup tie at Portsmouth F.C. in January 1976, and was sold later that year to Cardiff City F.C.
