= Roger Hynd =

Scottish footballer

Personal information
- Full name: John Roger Shankly Hynd
- Date of birth: 2 February 1942
- Place of birth: Falkirk, Scotland
- Date of death: 18 February 2017 (aged 75)
- Place of death: Glasgow, Scotland
- Position: Centre half

Senior career*
Years	Team	Apps	(Gls)
1961–1969	Rangers	31	(4)
1969–1970	Crystal Palace	30	(0)
1970–1975	Birmingham City	170	(4)
1975	→ Oxford United (loan)	5	(0)
1975–1978	Walsall	89	(1)
Total		325	(9)

Managerial career
- 1977–1978: Motherwell
- 1980: St Johnstone (caretaker)
- * Club domestic league appearances and goals

John Roger Shankly Hynd (2 February 1942 – 18 February 2017) was a Scottish professional footballer who played as a centre half.

He started his playing career at Rangers, for whom he played in the 1967 European Cup Winners' Cup Final, before moving to the English Football League. He played nearly 300 League matches for Crystal Palace, Birmingham City – with whom he played more than 200 games and was named Player of the Year as they won promotion to the First Division in 1972 – Oxford United and Walsall. He had a brief spell as manager of Motherwell and a six-game spell as interim manager of St Johnstone before leaving professional football to work as a PE teacher. He was the nephew of Bill Shankly.

In 2012, Hynd was one of seven former players elected to Birmingham City's Hall of Fame. He died in February 2017, aged 75.

== Honours ==
Rangers

- European Cup Winners' Cup runners-up: 1966–67

Birmingham City

- Football League Second Division runners-up: 1971–72

Individual

- Birmingham City F.C. Hall of Fame: inducted 2012
