= Dave Robinson (footballer, born 1948) =

English footballer and manager (1948–2016)

Personal information
- Full name: David Robinson
- Date of birth: 14 July 1948
- Place of birth: Birmingham, England
- Date of death: April 2016 (aged 67)
- Position: Central defender

Youth career
- 1964–1966: Birmingham City

Senior career*
Years	Team	Apps	(Gls)
1966–1973	Birmingham City	112	(2)
1973–1977	Walsall	165	(3)
1977–1979	Tamworth		

Managerial career
- 1977–1979: Tamworth (player-manager)
- 1980–1982: Oldbury United
- * Club domestic league appearances and goals

David Robinson (14 July 1948 – April 2016) was an English professional footballer who played as a central defender. He played nearly 300 games in the Football League for Birmingham City and Walsall, before joining Southern League club Tamworth as player-manager. He later managed Oldbury United.

Robinson died in April 2016 at the age of 67.

== Honours ==
- Birmingham City
  - Second Division runners-up: 1971–72
