= Ray Martin (English footballer) =

English footballer

Personal information
- Full name: Raymond Barry Martin
- Date of birth: 23 January 1945 (age 81)
- Place of birth: Wolverhampton, England
- Position: Full back

Youth career
- 1960–1961: Aston Villa
- 1961–1962: Birmingham City

Senior career*
Years	Team	Apps	(Gls)
1962–1976	Birmingham City	333	(1)
1975	→ Portland Timbers (loan)	16	(0)
1976–1977	Portland Timbers	46	(0)
1979	Minnesota Kicks	1	(0)
Total		396	(1)
- * Club domestic league appearances and goals

Raymond Barry Martin (born 23 January 1945) is an English former professional footballer born in Wolverhampton, Staffordshire, who played as a full back. He spent most of his professional career in England with Birmingham City, where he played 333 games in the Football League, became the club captain, and won the Player of the Year award two years running, in 1969–70 and 1970–71. His only goal for the club came against Hull City, a snapshot from the edge of the area in a 4–2 defeat at St Andrew's in April 1970. He was a master of the slide tackle. The club awarded him a testimonial match against Wolverhampton Wanderers in 1971.

He later moved to the United States, initially playing for Portland Timbers and Minnesota Kicks in the North American Soccer League, and then coaching at Oregon State University.

== Honours ==
- Football League Second Division runners-up: 1971–72
