= Freddie Goodwin =

English football player/manager & cricketer

Personal information
- Date of birth: 28 June 1933
- Place of birth: Heywood, Lancashire, England
- Date of death: 19 February 2016 (aged 82)
- Place of death: Gig Harbor, Washington, U.S.
- Height: 6 ft 1 in (1.86 m)
- Position: Wing half

Youth career
- Manchester United

Senior career*
Years	Team	Apps	(Gls)
1953–1960	Manchester United	95	(7)
1960–1964	Leeds United	107	(2)
1964–1966	Scunthorpe United	6	(1)
1967	New York Generals	1	(0)
Total		221	(10)

Managerial career
- 1964–1966: Scunthorpe United (player-manager)
- 1966–1967: Scunthorpe United
- 1967–1968: New York Generals
- 1968–1970: Brighton and Hove Albion
- 1970–1975: Birmingham City
- 1976–1978: Minnesota Kicks
- 1980–1981: Minnesota Kicks
- * Club domestic league appearances and goals

Freddie Goodwin (28 June 1933 – 19 February 2016) was an English professional football player and manager. He also played county cricket for Lancashire.

== Career ==
A wing half, Goodwin was signed as a trainee from Cheshire Schoolboys by Manchester United on 1 October 1953 as one of the Busby Babes. He made his senior debut for the club on 20 November 1954 against Arsenal. He helped the club win the 1956 and 1957 league championships, and was a member of the United team that made a comeback from the Munich air disaster that claimed the lives of eight players and ended the careers of two others, to reach the 1958 FA Cup final, losing 2–0 to Bolton Wanderers. He was not on the plane to Munich, having not been selected in the squad for the quarter-final second leg tie with Red Star Belgrade of Yugoslavia.

In his United career, he scored eight goals in 107 appearances. He was signed by Leeds United on 16 March 1960 for £10,000. In the 1963–64 season, a collision with former Leeds teammate John Charles in an FA Cup tie against Cardiff City caused him to suffer a triple fracture of his leg, eventually resulting in his retirement from playing on 1 December 1964. He scored two goals in 120 appearances for Leeds.

Goodwin went on to become a player-manager at Scunthorpe United, although he did not play many games due to his injury, making six appearances and scoring one goal for the club. He left Scunthorpe United on 1 June 1966 and then became manager for the New York Generals (appearing in one match) and Brighton & Hove Albion, before becoming manager of Second Division club Birmingham City. It was at Birmingham where he introduced the young Trevor Francis into league football. At Birmingham, he was also known for introducing yoga, psychological testing and other new training techniques.

Goodwin also made 11 first-class appearances for Lancashire County Cricket Club (1955–1956) as a right-arm fast-medium bowler.

== Later life ==
Goodwin later moved to the United States to coach and serve as president of the Minnesota Kicks. He later relocated to Washington state, where he coached Tacoma Stars and started a travel agency on Vashon Island. He died of cancer at Gig Harbor, Washington, on 19 February 2016 at the age of 82.

== Honours ==
Manchester United

- FA Cup runner-up: 1957–58
