= Garry Pendrey =

English football player and manager

Personal information
- Full name: Garry James Sidney Pendrey
- Date of birth: 9 February 1949 (age 77)
- Place of birth: Birmingham, England
- Height: 5 ft 10 in (1.78 m)
- Position: Defender

Youth career
- 1965–1966: Birmingham City

Senior career*
Years	Team	Apps	(Gls)
1966–1979	Birmingham City	306	(4)
1979–1981	West Bromwich Albion	18	(0)
1981	Torquay United	12	(0)
1981–1982	Bristol Rovers	1	(0)
1982–1983	Walsall	8	(1)
Total		345	(5)

Managerial career
- 1987–1989: Birmingham City
- * Club domestic league appearances and goals

Garry James Sidney Pendrey (born 9 February 1949) is an English former professional footballer who played as a defender, making 345 appearances in the Football League, including more than 300 for Birmingham City. After playing he went into coaching, as manager of Birmingham City, as assistant manager under Alan Buckley at Walsall and Graham Turner at Wolverhampton Wanderers, and as coach or assistant manager under Gordon Strachan at Coventry City, Southampton, Celtic and Middlesbrough.

In 2012, Pendrey was one of seven former players elected to Birmingham City's Hall of Fame.

== Playing career ==
Born in Birmingham, Pendrey spent his entire playing career in England. He signed for Birmingham City in 1965 as an apprentice defender, before agreeing professional terms in October 1966. He played for the club until 1979, making 360 appearances in all competitions and scoring five goals. He then had spells playing for West Bromwich Albion, Torquay United, Bristol Rovers and Walsall.

== Coaching and management ==
Pendrey had joined Walsall in 1982 as player-coach, and after retiring as a player he continued on the club's coaching staff. As assistant to manager Alan Buckley, he helped coach the team to the League Cup semi-final in 1984. In August 1986, Buckley and Pendrey were sacked when Walsall was sold to a new owner, Terry Ramsden. He then spent a few months on the coaching staff at Wolverhampton Wanderers before returning to Birmingham as manager in June 1987. With a dwindling squad and no money to spend on replacements, Pendrey was fighting a losing battle. On 24 May 1989, with relegation to the Third Division for the first time in the club's history confirmed, the new owners sacked him and appointed Dave Mackay as manager. Pendrey refused the offer of a coaching role, and two months later rejoined the coaching staff at Wolves. He became assistant to manager Graham Turner; the pair resigned in March 1994.

=== With Gordon Strachan ===
In 1995, Ron Atkinson took over as manager of Coventry City and brought in Gordon Strachan as player-assistant manager and Pendrey as coach. When Strachan moved up to manager in November 1996, Pendrey was appointed his assistant. When Strachan left Coventry in September 2001 following their relegation after 34 years in the top flight, Pendrey also left the club, only to reunite as manager and assistant at Southampton on 22 October. After Strachan left Southampton in February 2004, new manager Paul Sturrock did not keep Pendrey on.

On 1 June 2005, Pendrey joined Celtic as Strachan's assistant manager. After the resignation of Strachan at the end of the 2008–09 season, Pendrey left Celtic.

When Strachan was appointed manager of Middlesbrough in October 2009 to succeed Gareth Southgate, Pendrey joined him as his assistant. He followed Strachan out of the club in October 2010.

== Sources ==
- Matthews, Tony (1995). Birmingham City: A Complete Record. Derby: Breedon Books. ISBN 978-1-85983-010-9.
