= 1977–78 Birmingham City F.C. season =

Birmingham City F.C.
1977–78 season
- Chairman: Keith Coombs
- Manager: Willie Bell; (until September 1977); Sir Alf Ramsey; (until March 1978); Jim Smith
- Ground: St Andrew's
- Football League First Division: 11th
- FA Cup: Fourth round (eliminated by Derby County)
- League Cup: Second round (eliminated by Notts County)
- Anglo-Scottish Cup: Group stage
- Top goalscorer: League: Trevor Francis (25); All: Trevor Francis (29)
- Highest home attendance: 33,679 vs Aston Villa, 25 February 1978
- Lowest home attendance: 9,512 vs Bristol City, Anglo-Scottish Cup, 12 August 1977
- Average home league attendance: 23,910
Home colours

The 1977–78 Football League season was Birmingham City Football Club's 75th in the Football League and their 44th in the First Division. They finished in 11th position in the 22-team division. They entered the 1977–78 FA Cup at the third round proper and lost to Derby County in the fourth, and lost to Notts County in their opening second-round match in the League Cup. They entered the Anglo-Scottish Cup but failed to progress past the group stage.

Twenty-two players made at least one appearance in nationally organised first-team competition, and there were ten different goalscorers. Forward pairing Keith Bertschin and Trevor Francis played in all 48 first-team matches of the season – midfielder Terry Hibbitt missed only one – and Francis was the club's top scorer with 29 goals, of which 25 were scored in the league. Both Francis and Hibbitt had been ever-present in the previous season.

After defeats in the first four league matches of the season, Willie Bell was sacked in September and succeeded by former England national manager Sir Alf Ramsey, a member of the club's board of directors. Ramsey lasted only six months, leaving the club ostensibly for health reasons, but his biography suggests he was "locked in an increasingly bitter three-way dispute with his star player, Trevor Francis, and the board". After initially accepting a transfer request from Francis, the board changed their minds, reluctant to "incur the wrath of already disgruntled fans", so Ramsey handed in his notice. The Times reported that "Sir Alf said he told the board [in February] that he intended to quit and sever his links with the club. ... He said at a board meeting on February 20 he recommended both Francis and the defender, Joe Gallagher, should be transfer listed. The board agreed but three days later changed their minds about Francis. Sir Alf said he then decided to opt out because of the board's policy." Blackburn Rovers manager Jim Smith took over, having decided, according to the Rovers' website, that "Birmingham City offered better career prospects".

== Football League First Division ==
Date	League position	Opponents	Venue	Result	Score F–A	Scorers	Attendance
20 August 1977	21st	Manchester United	H	L	1–4	Hibbitt	28,005
24 August 1977	22nd	Chelsea	A	L	0–2		18,108
27 August 1977	22nd	Leeds United	A	L	0–1		24,551
3 September 1977	22nd	Liverpool	H	L	0–1		28,239
10 September 1977	20th	Middlesbrough	A	W	2–1	Francis 2	19,240
17 September 1977	18th	Newcastle United	H	W	3–0	Connolly, Bertschin 2	19,259
24 September 1977	19th	West Bromwich Albion	A	L	1–3	Connolly	29,115
1 October 1977	16th	Aston Villa	A	W	1–0	Bertschin	45,436
4 October 1977	13th	Queens Park Rangers	H	W	2–1	Francis 2	21,304
8 October 1977	16th	Coventry City	H	D	1–1	Francis pen	27,412
15 October 1977	16th	Ipswich Town	A	L	2–5	Francis 2	21,313
22 October 1977	15th	Derby County	H	W	3–1	Hibbitt 2, Towers	23,108
29 October 1977	14th	Arsenal	A	D	1–1	Bertschin	31,355
5 November 1977	11th	Wolverhampton Wanderers	H	W	2–1	Francis, Hibbitt	28,103
12 November 1977	14th	Everton	A	L	1–2	Bertschin	37,743
19 November 1977	14th	Leicester City	H	D	1–1	Francis	21,208
26 November 1977	16th	Norwich City	A	L	0–1		16,800
3 December 1977	16th	Nottingham Forest	H	L	0–2		29,925
10 December 1977	18th	Manchester City	A	L	0–3		36,671
17 December 1977	18th	Everton	H	D	0–0		22,177
26 December 1977	18th	West Ham United	A	L	0–1		25,572
27 December 1977	18th	Bristol City	H	W	3–0	Gallagher, Towers, Francis	24,110
31 December 1977	18th	Chelsea	H	L	4–5	Bertschin, Francis 2, Hibbitt	19,876
2 January 1978	16th	Manchester United	A	W	2–1	Dillon, Francis	53,501
14 January 1978	18th	Leeds United	H	L	2–3	Bertschin, Connolly	23,703
21 January 1978	17th	Liverpool	A	W	3–2	Emmanuel, Bertschin, Francis	48,401
4 February 1978	18th	Middlesbrough	H	L	1–2	Gallagher	14,302
25 February 1978	17th	Aston Villa	H	W	1–0	Francis	33,679
28 February 1978	17th	West Bromwich Albion	H	L	1–2	Francis	26,633
4 March 1978	18th	Coventry City	A	L	0–4		22,925
15 March 1978	18th	Newcastle United	A	D	1–1	Francis	19,486
18 March 1978	18th	Derby County	A	W	3–1	Connolly, Francis, Bertschin	19,843
21 March 1978	18th	Arsenal	H	D	1–1	Francis	22,087
25 March 1978	15th	Bristol City	A	W	1–0	Francis	21,434
28 March 1978	13th	West Ham United	H	W	3–0	Francis 2 (1 pen), Bertschin	23,554
1 April 1978	12th	Wolverhampton Wanderers	A	W	1–0	Francis	19,926
8 April 1978	12th	Norwich City	H	W	2–1	Gallagher, Francis	20,858
11 April 1978	10th	Ipswich Town	H	D	0–0		19,289
15 April 1978	9th	Leicester City	A	W	4–1	Hibbitt, Pendrey, Bertschin, Francis	15,431
22 April 1978	11th	Manchester City	H	L	1–4	Sbragia	25,294
25 April 1978	11th	Queens Park Rangers	A	D	0–0		16,049
29 April 1978	11th	Nottingham Forest	A	D	0–0		37,625

=== League table (part) ===
Final First Division table (part)
Pos	Team	Pld	W	D	L	GF	GA	GD	Pts
9th	Leeds United	42	18	10	14	63	53	+10	46
10th	Manchester United	42	16	10	16	67	63	+4	42
11th	Birmingham City	42	16	9	17	55	60	−5	41
12th	Derby County	42	14	13	15	54	59	−5	41
13th	Norwich City	42	11	18	13	52	66	−14	40

== FA Cup ==
Round	Date	Opponents	Venue	Result	Score F–A	Scorers	Attendance
Third round	7 January 1978	Wigan Athletic	H	W	4–0	Francis 2, Bertschin 2	29,202
Fourth round	1 February 1978	Derby County	A	L	1–2	Bertschin	31,955

== League Cup ==
Round	Date	Opponents	Venue	Result	Score F–A	Scorers	Attendance
Second round	30 August 1977	Notts County	H	L	0–2		14,993

== Anglo-Scottish Cup ==
Round	Date	Opponents	Venue	Result	Score F–A	Scorers	Attendance
Group stage	5 August 1977	Plymouth Argyle	A	D	1–1	Craven og	5,176
Group stage	9 August 1977	Bristol Rovers	A	D	1–1	Francis	2,317
Group stage	12 August 1977	Bristol City	H	W	1–0	Francis	9,512

== Appearances and goals ==
Numbers in parentheses denote appearances made as a substitute.
Players marked † left the club during the playing season.
Key to positions: GK – Goalkeeper; DF – Defender; MF – Midfielder; FW – Forward

Players' appearances and goals by competition
Pos.	Nat.	Name	League		FA Cup		League Cup		Anglo-Scottish Cup		Total	
Pos.	Nat.	Name	Apps	Goals	Apps	Goals	Apps	Goals	Apps	Goals	Apps	Goals
GK	ENG	Dave Latchford	1	0	0	0	0	0	0	0	1	0
GK	ENG	Jimmy Montgomery	41	0	1	0	1	0	3	0	46	0
GK	ENG	Steve Smith †	0	0	1	0	0	0	0	0	1	0
DF	SCO	Jimmy Calderwood	36	0	2	0	1	0	0 (1)	0	39 (1)	0
DF	ENG	Joe Gallagher	21	3	2	0	0	0	0	0	23	3
DF	ENG	Pat Howard	35	0	2	0	1	0	0	0	38	0
DF	ENG	Garry Pendrey	37	1	1	0	1	0	3	0	42	1
DF	ENG	Mick Rathbone	2	0	0	0	0	0	2	0	4	0
DF	SCO	Ricky Sbragia	5	1	0	0	0	0	2	0	7	1
DF	ENG	Archie Styles	5 (1)	0	1	0	0	0	0	0	6 (1)	0
DF	ENG	Tony Want †	18	0	0	0	1	0	3	0	22	0
MF	ENG	Kevan Broadhurst	9 (1)	0	0	0	0	0	0	0	9 (1)	0
MF	SCO	John Connolly	12 (8)	4	1	0	0	0	3	0	16 (8)	4
MF	ENG	Kevin Dillon	16 (1)	1	2	0	0	0	0	0	18 (1)	2
MF	WAL	Gary Emmanuel	20 (2)	1	1	0	0	0	0	0	21 (2)	1
MF	ENG	Steve Fox	10 (1)	0	0	0	0	0	0	0	10 (1)	0
MF	ENG	Terry Hibbitt	41	6	2	0	1	0	3	0	47	6
MF	ENG	Gary Jones †	3 (2)	0	0	0	0	0	3	0	6 (2)	0
MF	WAL	Malcolm Page	29 (1)	0	0	0	1	0	3	0	33 (1)	0
MF	ENG	Tony Towers	37 (1)	2	2	0	1	0	2	0	42 (1)	2
FW	ENG	Keith Bertschin	42	11	2	3	1	0	3	0	48	14
FW	ENG	Trevor Francis	42	25	2	2	1	0	3	2	48	29

== See also ==
- Birmingham City F.C. seasons

== Sources ==
- Matthews, Tony (1995). Birmingham City: A Complete Record. Derby: Breedon Books. ISBN 978-1-85983-010-9.
- Matthews, Tony (2010). Birmingham City: The Complete Record. Derby: DB Publishing. ISBN 978-1-85983-853-2.
- For match dates and results: "Birmingham City 1977–1978 : Results". Statto Organisation. Archived from the original on 12 December 2015.
- For lineups, appearances, goalscorers and attendances: Matthews (2010), Complete Record, pp. 390–91, 478.
