= 1975–76 Birmingham City F.C. season =

Birmingham City F.C.
1975–76 season
- Chairman: Keith Coombs
- Manager: Freddie Goodwin; (until September 1975); Willie Bell
- Ground: St Andrew's
- Football League First Division: 19th
- FA Cup: Third round (eliminated by Portsmouth)
- League Cup: Third round (eliminated by Wolverhampton Wanderers)
- Top goalscorer: League: Trevor Francis (17); All: Trevor Francis (18)
- Highest home attendance: 46,251 vs Aston Villa, 3 April 1976
- Lowest home attendance: 18,238 vs Orient, League Cup 2nd round, 9 September 1975
- Average home league attendance: 28,002
Home colours

The 1975–76 Football League season was Birmingham City Football Club's 73rd in the Football League and their 42nd in the First Division. They were in the bottom four from mid-October onwards, and eventually finished in 19th position in the 22-team division, one place above the relegation places. They entered the 1975–76 FA Cup at the third round proper and lost to Portsmouth in that round after a replay, and lost to Wolverhampton Wanderers in the third round of the League Cup. To celebrate the centenary of the club's foundation in 1875, they played a friendly match against Celtic, winning 1–0.

Twenty-seven players made at least one first-team appearance, and there were thirteen different goalscorers. Defender Joe Gallagher missed only one of the 46 competitive matches played over the season, and Trevor Francis was the club's leading scorer with 18 goals, all but one scored in the league.

Keith Coombs took over the chairmanship following the death of his father Clifford.

== Football League First Division ==
Date	League position	Opponents	Venue	Result	Score F–A	Scorers	Attendance
16 August 1975	11th	Leicester City	A	D	3–3	Hatton, Kendall 2 (1 pen)	25,547
19 August 1975	14th	Manchester United	H	L	0–2		33,177
23 August 1975	19th	Everton	H	L	0–1		26,814
26 August 1975	21st	Middlesbrough	A	L	0–2		22,423
30 August 1975	21st	Ipswich Town	A	L	2–4	Hatton 2	22,659
6 September 1975	21st	Queens Park Rangers	H	D	1–1	Kendall	27,305
13 September 1975	21st	Wolverhampton Wanderers	A	L	0–2		25,142
20 September 1975	21st	Burnley	H	W	4–0	Campbell, Withe, Kendall, Francis	25,830
23 September 1975	17th	Newcastle United	H	W	3–2	Withe 2, Francis pen	31,166
27 September 1975	18th	Aston Villa	A	L	1–2	Francis	53,782
4 October 1975	17th	Sheffield United	H	W	2–0	Hatton, Francis	26,121
11 October 1975	19th	Liverpool	A	L	1–3	Hatton	36,532
18 October 1975	19th	Leeds United	H	D	2–2	Francis, Gallagher	33,775
25 October 1975	19th	Norwich City	A	L	0–1		19,605
1 November 1975	20th	West Ham United	H	L	1–5	Francis	28,474
8 November 1975	21st	Manchester City	A	L	0–2		28,329
15 November 1975	21st	Arsenal	H	W	3–1	Francis pen, Withe, Hatton	21,652
22 November 1975	21st	Leeds United	A	L	0–3		26,640
29 November 1975	21st	Coventry City	A	L	2–3	Burns, Kendall pen	21,800
6 December 1975	19th	Derby County	H	W	2–1	Burns, Page	30,620
13 December 1975	21st	Everton	A	L	2–5	Kendall, Withe	20,188
20 December 1975	19th	Leicester City	H	W	2–1	Francis pen, Withe	21,890
26 December 1975	19th	Tottenham Hotspur	A	W	3–1	Francis 2, Withe	21,651
27 December 1975	19th	Stoke City	H	D	1–1	Hatton	37,166
10 January 1976	19th	Wolverhampton Wanderers	H	L	0–1		28,552
17 January 1976	19th	Queens Park Rangers	A	L	1–2	Francis	16,759
31 January 1976	20th	Manchester United	A	L	1–3	Withe	50,274
7 February 1976	19th	Middlesbrough	H	W	2–1	Kendall, Hatton	18,599
14 February 1976	19th	Manchester City	H	W	2–1	Gallagher, Kendall	22,445
21 February 1976	19th	Arsenal	A	L	0–1		20,907
28 February 1976	19th	Norwich City	H	D	1–1	Francis pen	22,359
6 March 1976	19th	West Ham United	A	W	2–1	Withe, Emmanuel	19,863
13 March 1976	19th	Liverpool	H	L	0–1		31,797
20 March 1976	19th	Coventry City	H	D	1–1	Francis pen	22,956
27 March 1976	19th	Derby County	A	L	2–4	Francis, Needham	28,161
3 April 1976	19th	Aston Villa	H	W	3–2	Hibbitt, Burns, Francis	46,251
7 April 1976	19th	Newcastle United	A	L	0–4		18,900
10 April 1976	20th	Burnley	A	L	0–1		13,679
13 April 1976	19th	Ipswich Town	H	W	3–0	Francis pen, Hibbitt, Burns	20,497
17 April 1976	19th	Tottenham Hotspur	H	W	3–1	Gallagher, Francis, Burns	30,616
19 April 1976	19th	Stoke City	A	L	0–1		19,928
4 May 1976	19th	Sheffield United	A	D	1–1	Hibbitt	30,782

=== League table (part) ===
Final First Division table (part)
Pos	Club	Pld	W	D	L	F	A	GA	Pts
17th	Arsenal	42	13	10	19	47	53	0.89	36
18th	West Ham United	42	13	10	19	48	71	0.68	36
19th	Birmingham City	42	13	7	22	57	75	0.76	33
20th	Wolverhampton Wanderers	42	10	10	22	51	68	0.75	30
21st	Burnley	42	9	10	23	43	66	0.65	28
Key	Pos = League position; Pld = Matches played; W = Matches won; D = Matches drawn; L = Matches lost; F = Goals for; A = Goals against; GA = Goal average; Pts = Points								

== FA Cup ==
Round	Date	Opponents	Venue	Result	Score F–A	Scorers	Attendance
Third round	3 January 1976	Portsmouth	A	D	1–1	Francis	19,414
Third round replay	6 January 1976	Portsmouth	H	L	0–1		26,106

== League Cup ==
Round	Date	Opponents	Venue	Result	Score F–A	Scorers	Attendance
Second round	9 September 1975	Orient	H	W	4–0	Gallagher, Morton, Hatton, Want	18,238
Third round	7 October 1975	Wolverhampton Wanderers	H	L	0–2		29,822

== Centenary match ==
Date	Opponents	Venue	Result	Score F–A	Scorers	Attendance
25 November 1975	Celtic	H	W	1–0	Withe	14,670

== Appearances and goals ==
Numbers in parentheses denote appearances made as a substitute.
Players marked † left the club during the playing season.
Key to positions: GK – Goalkeeper; DF – Defender; MF – Midfielder; FW – Forward

Players' appearances and goals by competition
Pos.	Nat.	Name	League		FA Cup		League Cup		Total	
Pos.	Nat.	Name	Apps	Goals	Apps	Goals	Apps	Goals	Apps	Goals
GK	ENG	Dave Latchford	40	0	2	0	2	0	44	0
GK	ENG	Steve Smith	2	0	0	0	0	0	2	0
DF	ENG	Steve Bryant	19 (1)	0	1	0	1	0	21 (1)	0
DF	SCO	Kenny Burns	36	5	2	0	2	0	40	5
DF	ENG	Joe Gallagher	41	3	2	0	2	1	45	4
DF	SCO	Roger Hynd †	0 (1)	0	0	0	0	0	0 (1)	0
DF	ENG	Ray Martin	22	0	1	0	2	0	27	0
DF	ENG	Ian Osborne	10	0	1	0	0	0	11	0
DF	ENG	Garry Pendrey	14 (3)	0	1 (1)	0	1 (1)	0	16 (5)	0
DF	WAL	John Roberts	5 (2)	0	0	0	0	0	5 (2)	0
DF	ENG	Archie Styles	16	0	0	0	0	0	16	0
DF	ENG	Tony Want	20 (1)	0	2	0	0 (1)	1	20 (2)	1
MF	SCO	Jimmy Calderwood	15	3	0 (1)	0	0	0	15 (1)	3
MF	SCO	Alan Campbell †	9	1	1	0	1	1	11	2
MF	WAL	Gary Emmanuel	10 (1)	1	0	0	0	0	10 (1)	1
MF	ENG	Paul Hendrie †	5	0	0	0	0	0	5	0
MF	ENG	Terry Hibbitt	27	3	1	0	2	0	30	3
MF	SCO	Bobby Hope †	3	0	0	0	0	0	3	0
MF	ENG	Howard Kendall	36	8	1	0	2	0	39	8
MF	ENG	Roy Morton	0	0	0	0	1	1	1	1
MF	WAL	Malcolm Page	19	1	2	0	0	0	21	1
MF	ENG	Gordon Taylor †	7 (2)	0	0	0	0	0	7 (2)	0
FW	ENG	Trevor Francis	35	17	2	1	2	0	39	18
FW	ENG	Bob Hatton	33 (4)	8	2	0	2	1	37 (4)	9
FW	ENG	Andy Needham	2 (1)	1	0	0	0	0	2 (1)	0
FW	ENG	Steve Phillips †	4	0	0	0	0	0	4	0
FW	ENG	Peter Withe	32	9	2	0	2	0	36	9

== See also ==
- Birmingham City F.C. seasons
