= 1976–77 Birmingham City F.C. season =

Birmingham City F.C.
1976–77 season
- Chairman: Keith Coombs
- Manager: Willie Bell
- Ground: St Andrew's
- Football League First Division: 13th
- FA Cup: Fourth round (eliminated by Leeds United)
- League Cup: Second round (eliminated by Blackpool)
- Top goalscorer: League: Trevor Francis (21); All: Trevor Francis (21)
- Highest home attendance: 43,721 vs Aston Villa, 10 May 1977
- Lowest home attendance: 19,554 vs Stoke City, 16 April 1976
- Average home league attendance: 28,338
Home colours

The 1976–77 Football League season was Birmingham City Football Club's 74th in the Football League and their 43rd in the First Division. They finished in 13th position in the 22-team division. They entered the 1976–77 FA Cup at the third round proper and lost in the fourth to Leeds United, and lost to Blackpool in their opening second-round match in the League Cup.

Twenty-one players made at least one appearance in nationally organised first-team competition, and there were thirteen different goalscorers. Midfielder Terry Hibbitt and forward Trevor Francis played in all 45 first-team matches over the season, and the leading goalscorer was Francis with 21 goals, all scored in the league. Kenny Burns scored 20, of which 19 came in league competition.

== Football League First Division ==
Date	League position	Opponents	Venue	Result	Score F–A	Scorers	Attendance
21 August 1976	7th	Manchester United	A	D	2–2	Burns, Styles	58,898
24 August 1976	8th	Leeds United	H	D	0–0		35,519
28 August 1976	6th	Liverpool	H	W	2–1	Francis, Gallagher	33,228
4 September 1976	12th	Norwich City	A	L	0–1		18,506
11 September 1976	18th	West Bromwich Albion	H	L	0–1		39,450
18 September 1976	12th	Aston Villa	A	W	2–1	Burns, Connolly	50,084
25 September 1976	15th	Coventry City	A	L	1–2	Burns	26,371
2 October 1976	12th	Derby County	H	W	5–1	Burns 4, Connolly	29,190
16 October 1976	12th	Middlesbrough	H	W	3–1	Gallagher, Burns, Francis pen	27,740
20 October 1976	12th	Tottenham Hotspur	A	L	0–1		20,193
23 October 1976	15th	Newcastle United	A	L	2–3	Gallagher, Francis pen	31,711
26 October 1976	9th	Bristol City	A	W	1–0	Burns	21,474
30 October 1976	9th	Queens Park Rangers	H	W	2–1	Burns, Francis	31,471
6 November 1976	11th	Arsenal	A	L	0–4		23,063
20 November 1976	14th	Stoke City	A	L	0–1		21,488
27 November 1976	13th	Manchester City	H	D	0–0		29,722
4 December 1976	8th	Leicester City	A	W	6–2	Emmanuel, Francis, Burns 3, Rofe og	20,388
7 December 1976	9th	Ipswich Town	H	L	2–4	Connolly, Burns	31,161
11 December 1976	7th	Sunderland	H	W	2–0	Jones, Francis	24,597
18 December 1976	8th	Everton	A	D	2–2	Francis, Hibbitt	32,532
27 December 1976	8th	West Ham United	H	D	0–0		39,978
18 January 1977	9th	Arsenal	H	D	3–3	Francis 3	23,247
22 January 1977	10th	Manchester United	H	L	2–3	Francis, Emmanuel	35,316
2 February 1977	12th	Leeds United	A	L	0–1		22,805
5 February 1977	14th	Liverpool	A	L	1–4	Burns	41,072
12 February 1977	11th	Norwich City	H	W	3–2	Burns 2, Broadhurst	21,801
28 February 1977	13th	West Bromwich Albion	A	L	1–3	Francis	28,639
5 March 1977	12th	Coventry City	H	W	3–1	Francis, Connolly, Emmanuel	22,607
12 March 1977	13th	Derby County	A	D	0–0		25,256
19 March 1977	13th	Tottenham Hotspur	H	L	1–2	Connolly	23,398
22 March 1977	11th	Middlesbrough	A	D	2–2	Francis 2	16,439
2 April 1977	13th	Newcastle United	H	L	1–2	Fox	20,283
8 April 1977	13th	West Ham United	A	D	2–2	Gallagher, Francis	28,167
9 April 1977	12th	Bristol City	H	W	3–0	Francis 3 (2 pens)	19,626
11 April 1977	12th	Ipswich Town	A	L	0–1		29,026
16 April 1977	12th	Stoke City	H	W	2–0	Francis, Burns	19,554
19 April 1977	12th	Manchester City	A	L	1–2	Burns	36,203
30 April 1977	13th	Leicester City	H	D	1–1	Kendall	20,836
7 May 1977	14th	Sunderland	A	L	0–1		34,189
10 May 1977	12th	Aston Villa	H	W	2–1	Hibbitt, Francis pen	43,721
14 May 1977	12th	Everton	H	D	1–1	Kendall	22,660
23 May 1977	13th	Queens Park Rangers	A	D	2–2	Kendall, McDonough	14,976

=== League table (part) ===
Final First Division table (part)
Pos	Team	Pld	W	D	L	GF	GA	GD	Pts
11th	Leicester City	42	12	18	12	47	60	−3	42
12th	Middlesbrough	42	14	13	15	40	45	−5	41
13th	Birmingham City	42	13	12	17	63	61	+2	38
14th	Queens Park Rangers	42	13	12	17	47	52	−5	38
15th	Derby County	42	9	19	14	50	55	−5	37

== FA Cup ==
Round	Date	Opponents	Venue	Result	Score F–A	Scorers	Attendance
Third round	8 January 1977	Portsmouth	H	W	1–0	Kendall	31,598
Fourth round	29 January 1977	Leeds United	H	L	1–2	Burns	38,663

== League Cup ==
Round	Date	Opponents	Venue	Result	Score F–A	Scorers	Attendance
Second round	31 August 1976	Blackpool	A	L	1–2	Pendrey	12,203

== Appearances and goals ==
Numbers in parentheses denote appearances made as a substitute.
Players marked † left the club during the playing season.
Key to positions: GK – Goalkeeper; DF – Defender; MF – Midfielder; FW – Forward

Players' appearances and goals by competition
Pos.	Nat.	Name	League		FA Cup		League Cup		Total	
Pos.	Nat.	Name	Apps	Goals	Apps	Goals	Apps	Goals	Apps	Goals
GK	ENG	Dave Latchford	30	0	2	0	1	0	33	0
GK	ENG	Jimmy Montgomery	12	0	0	0	0	0	12	0
DF	ENG	Joe Gallagher	37	4	2	0	1	0	40	4
DF	WAL	Malcolm Page	31	0	2	0	1	0	34	0
DF	ENG	Garry Pendrey	24 (3)	0	0	0	1	1	25 (3)	1
DF	ENG	Mick Rathbone	13 (3)	0	2	0	1	0	16 (3)	0
DF	SCO	Ricky Sbragia	8 (1)	0	0	0	0	0	8 (1)	0
DF	ENG	Archie Styles	24	1	2	0	0	0	26	1
DF	ENG	Tony Want	29	0	0 (1)	0	1	0	30 (1)	0
MF	ENG	Kevan Broadhurst	2	1	0	0	0	0	2	1
MF	SCO	Jimmy Calderwood	22 (4)	0	0	0	0	0	22 (4)	0
MF	SCO	John Connolly	37	5	2	0	0	0	39	5
MF	WAL	Gary Emmanuel	10 (6)	3	0	0	0	0	10 (6)	3
MF	ENG	Steve Fox	3 (1)	1	0	0	0	0	3 (1)	1
MF	ENG	Terry Hibbitt	42	2	2	0	1	0	45	2
MF	ENG	Gary Jones	30	1	2	0	0	0	32	1
MF	ENG	Howard Kendall	25	3	2	0	1	0	28	3
FW	SCO	Kenny Burns	36	19	2	1	1	0	39	20
FW	ENG	Trevor Francis	42	21	2	0	1	0	45	21
FW	ENG	Roy McDonough	2	1	0	0	0	0	2	1
FW	ENG	Peter Withe †	3	0	0	0	1	0	4	0

== See also ==
- Birmingham City F.C. seasons

== Sources ==
- Matthews, Tony (1995). Birmingham City: A Complete Record. Derby: Breedon Books. ISBN 978-1-85983-010-9.
- Matthews, Tony (2010). Birmingham City: The Complete Record. Derby: DB Publishing. ISBN 978-1-85983-853-2.
- For match dates and results: "Birmingham City 1976–1977 : Results". Statto Organisation. Archived from the original on 4 March 2016.
- For lineups, appearances, goalscorers and attendances: Matthews (2010), Complete Record, pp. 388–89.
