= 1978–79 Birmingham City F.C. season =

Birmingham City F.C.
1978–79 season
- Chairman: Keith Coombs
- Manager: Jim Smith
- Ground: St Andrew's
- Football League First Division: 21st
- FA Cup: Third round (eliminated by Burnley)
- League Cup: Second round (eliminated by Southampton)
- Top goalscorer: League: Alan Buckley (8); All: Alan Buckley (8)
- Highest home attendance: 36,145 vs Aston Villa, 21 October 1978
- Lowest home attendance: 12,168 vs Norwich City, 27 March 1979
- Average home league attendance: 20,164
Home colours

The 1978–79 Football League season was Birmingham City Football Club's 76th in the Football League and their 45th in the First Division. They were in the bottom two positions in the 22-team division from 9 September onwards, eventually finishing 21st position, so were relegated to the Second Division for 1979–80. They lost in their opening matches in both the 1978–79 FA Cup and the League Cup, eliminated by Burnley and Southampton respectively.

Twenty-seven players made at least one appearance in nationally organised first-team competition, and there were thirteen different goalscorers. Defender Joe Gallagher played in every game but one over the season, and Alan Buckley was the club's top scorer with 8 goals, all scored in the league. Jim Smith, in his first full season as Birmingham's manager, brought Argentina's World Cup-winning full-back Alberto Tarantini to the club.

Trevor Francis, who joined Birmingham as a 15-year-old, became the first British footballer to be transferred for a fee of at least £1 million when Brian Clough signed him for league champions Nottingham Forest in February 1979. The basic fee was below £1m – Clough claimed in his autobiography to have set the fee at £999,999 because he did not want the idea of being the first £1m player going to Francis's head – but VAT and the transfer levy raised the total payable to £1.18m. Within three months he scored the winning goal in the 1979 European Cup Final.

== Football League First Division ==
Date	League position	Opponents	Venue	Result	Score F–A	Scorers	Attendance
19 August 1978	19th	Manchester United	A	L	0–1		56,139
22 August 1978	21st	Middlesbrough	H	L	1–3	Bertschin	24,409
26 August 1978	20th	Derby County	H	D	1–1	Givens	21,973
2 September 1978	17th	Bolton Wanderers	A	D	2–2	Francis 2	20,284
9 September 1978	21st	Liverpool	H	L	0–3		31,740
16 September 1978	22nd	Norwich City	A	L	0–4		15,701
23 September 1978	21st	Chelsea	H	D	1–1	Givens	18,458
30 September 1978	22nd	Leeds United	A	L	0–3		23,331
7 October 1978	22nd	Manchester City	H	L	1–2	Ainscow	18,378
14 October 1978	22nd	Tottenham Hotspur	A	L	0–1		41,230
21 October 1978	22nd	Aston Villa	H	L	0–1		36,145
28 October 1978	22nd	Coventry City	A	L	1–2	Givens	25,429
4 November 1978	22nd	West Bromwich Albion	A	L	0–1		32,130
11 November 1978	22nd	Manchester United	H	W	5–1	Dillon, Buckley 2, Givens, Calderwood	23,550
18 November 1978	22nd	Derby County	A	L	1–2	Givens	24,720
21 November 1978	22nd	Bolton Wanderers	H	W	3–0	Dillon, Buckley, Jones og	21,643
25 November 1978	21st	Bristol City	H	D	1–1	Tarantini	21,152
2 December 1978	21st	Southampton	A	L	0–1		18,957
9 December 1978	21st	Everton	H	L	1–3	Buckley	23,391
16 December 1978	21st	Nottingham Forest	A	L	0–1		25,224
26 December 1978	22nd	Wolverhampton Wanderers	A	L	1–2	Buckley	26,872
30 December 1978	22nd	Arsenal	A	L	1–3	Francis pen	27,877
3 February 1979	22nd	Chelsea	A	L	1–2	Bertschin	22,511
10 February 1979	22nd	Leeds United	H	L	0–1		17,388
13 February 1979	22nd	Liverpool	A	L	0–1		35,207
24 February 1979	22nd	Tottenham Hotspur	H	W	1–0	Towers	20,980
3 March 1979	22nd	Aston Villa	A	L	0–1		42,419
6 March 1979	22nd	Queens Park Rangers	H	W	3–1	Buckley, Towers pen, Broadhurst	12,605
10 March 1979	22nd	Coventry City	H	D	0–0		17,528
24 March 1979	22nd	Middlesbrough	A	L	1–2	Givens	15,013
27 March 1979	21st	Norwich City	H	W	1–0	Givens	12,168
31 March 1979	21st	Bristol City	A	L	1–2	Gallagher	16,453
3 April 1979	21st	Ipswich Town	H	D	1–1	Gallagher	12,449
7 April 1979	21st	Southampton	H	D	2–2	Barrowclough 2 (1 pen)	12,825
14 April 1979	21st	Wolverhampton Wanderers	H	D	1–1	Ainscow	20,556
17 April 1979	21st	Ipswich Town	A	L	0–3		17,677
21 April 1979	21st	Nottingham Forest	H	L	0–2		22,189
24 April 1979	21st	West Bromwich Albion	H	D	1–1	Gallagher	19,897
28 April 1979	21st	Everton	A	L	0–1		23,048
1 May 1979	21st	Manchester City	A	L	1–3	Lynex	27,366
5 May 1979	21st	Arsenal	H	D	0–0		14,015
7 May 1979	21st	Queens Park Rangers	A	W	3–1	Buckley 2, Dark	9,600

=== League table (part) ===
Final First Division table (part)
Pos	Team	Pld	W	D	L	GF	GA	GD	Pts
18th	Wolverhampton Wanderers	42	13	8	21	44	68	−24	34
19th	Derby County	42	10	11	21	44	71	−27	31
20th	Queens Park Rangers	42	6	13	23	45	73	−28	25
21st	Birmingham City	42	6	10	26	37	64	−27	22
22nd	Chelsea	42	5	10	27	45	92	−47	20

== FA Cup ==
Round	Date	Opponents	Venue	Result	Score F–A	Scorers	Attendance
Third round	6 January 1979	Burnley	H	L	0–2		19,034

== League Cup ==
Round	Date	Opponents	Venue	Result	Score F–A	Scorers	Attendance
Second round	29 August 1978	Southampton	H	L	2–5	Gallagher, Francis	18,464

== Appearances and goals ==
Numbers in parentheses denote appearances made as a substitute.
Players with name in italics and marked * were on loan from another club for the whole of their season with Birmingham.
Players marked † left the club during the playing season.
Key to positions: GK – Goalkeeper; DF – Defender; MF – Midfielder; FW – Forward

Players' appearances and goals by competition
Pos.	Nat.	Name	League		FA Cup		League Cup		Total	
Pos.	Nat.	Name	Apps	Goals	Apps	Goals	Apps	Goals	Apps	Goals
GK	ENG	Neil Freeman	29	0	0	0	0	0	29	0
GK	ENG	Jimmy Montgomery	13	0	1	0	1	0	15	0
DF	ENG	Kevan Broadhurst	13 (3)	1	1	0	1	0	15 (3)	1
DF	SCO	Jimmy Calderwood	24 (1)	1	0	0	0	0	24 (1)	0
DF	ENG	Mark Dennis	31	0	1	0	0	0	32	0
DF	ENG	Joe Gallagher	41	3	1	0	1	1	43	4
DF	ENG	Pat Howard	5	0	0	0	0	0	5	0
DF	WAL	Malcolm Page	32	0	1	0	1	0	35	0
DF	ENG	Garry Pendrey	9 (1)	0	0	0	1	0	10 (1)	0
DF	ENG	Mick Rathbone †	2	0	0	0	0	0	2	0
DF	ARG	Alberto Tarantini	23	1	1	0	0	0	24	1
DF	WAL	Pat Van Den Hauwe	7 (1)	0	0	0	0	0	7 (1)	0
MF	ENG	Alan Ainscow	27 (4)	2	0	0	1	0	28 (4)	2
MF	ENG	Stewart Barrowclough	26 (3)	2	0	0	1	0	27 (3)	2
MF	ENG	Trevor Dark	2 (3)	1	0	0	0	0	2 (3)	1
MF	ENG	Kevin Dillon	36 (1)	2	1	0	0	0	37 (1)	2
MF	WAL	Gary Emmanuel †	12 (1)	0	0	0	1	0	13 (1)	0
MF	ENG	Steve Fox †	13 (1)	0	0	0	0	0	13 (1)	0
MF	ENG	Steve Lynex	2	1	0	0	0	0	2	1
MF	SCO	Bruce Rioch *	3	0	0	0	0	0	3	0
MF	ENG	Tony Towers	31 (1)	2	1	0	0 (1)	0	32 (2)	2
FW	ENG	Keith Bertschin	9	2	0 (1)	0	1	0	10 (1)	2
FW	ENG	Malcolm Briggs	0 (1)	0	0	0	0	0	0 (1)	0
FW	ENG	Alan Buckley	24 (4)	8	1	0	0	0	25 (4)	8
FW	ENG	Trevor Francis †	8 (1)	3	1	0	1	1	10 (1)	4
FW	IRL	Don Givens	38 (1)	7	1	0	1	0	40 (1)	7
FW	ENG	Paul Ivey	3 (2)	0	0	0	0	0	3 (2)	0

== See also ==
- Birmingham City F.C. seasons

== Sources ==
- Matthews, Tony (1995). Birmingham City: A Complete Record. Derby: Breedon Books. ISBN 978-1-85983-010-9.
- Matthews, Tony (2010). Birmingham City: The Complete Record. Derby: DB Publishing. ISBN 978-1-85983-853-2.
- For match dates and results: "Birmingham City 1978–1979 : Results". Statto Organisation. Archived from the original on 4 March 2016.
- For lineups, appearances, goalscorers and attendances: Matthews (2010), Complete Record, pp. 392–93.
