= 1980–81 Birmingham City F.C. season =

Birmingham City F.C.
1980–81 season
- Chairman: Keith Coombs
- Manager: Jim Smith
- Ground: St Andrew's
- Football League First Division: 13th of 22
- FA Cup: Fourth round (eliminated by Coventry City)
- League Cup: Fifth round (eliminated by Liverpool)
- Top goalscorer: League: Frank Worthington (16); All: Frank Worthington (18)
- Highest home attendance: 33,879 vs Aston Villa, 11 October 1980
- Lowest home attendance: 12,163 vs Bristol City, League Cup 2nd round, 26 August 1980
- Average home league attendance: 19,248
Home colours

The 1980–81 Football League season was Birmingham City Football Club's 78th in the Football League and their 46th in the First Division, to which they were promoted in 1979–80. They finished in 13th position in the 22-team division. They entered the 1980–81 FA Cup in the third round proper and lost to Coventry City in the fourth, and were eliminated in the quarter-final of the League Cup by Liverpool.

Twenty-three players made at least one appearance in nationally organised first-team competition, and there were eleven different goalscorers. Defenders Joe Gallagher and Dave Langan and midfielder Archie Gemmill each played in every game but one over the season, and Frank Worthington was the club's top scorer with 18 goals, of which 16 were scored in the league.

== Football League First Division ==
Date	League position	Opponents	Venue	Result	Score F–A	Scorers	Attendance
16 August 1980	4th	Coventry City	H	W	3–1	Curbishley 2, Dillon	21,877
20 August 1980	10th	Nottingham Forest	A	L	1–2	Worthington	26,561
23 August 1980	7th	Manchester United	H	D	0–0		28,661
30 August 1980	13th	Southampton	A	L	1–3	Worthington	21,683
6 September 1980	15th	Liverpool	H	D	1–1	Worthington	27,042
13 September 1980	14th	Brighton & Hove Albion	A	D	2–2	Curbishley, Bertschin	15,767
20 September 1980	15th	West Bromwich Albion	H	D	1–1	Givens	22,016
27 September 1980	14th	Norwich City	A	D	2–2	Ainscow, Worthington	13,561
4 October 1980	15th	Wolverhampton Wanderers	A	L	0–1		22,777
7 October 1980	13th	Arsenal	H	W	3–1	Lynex, Worthington, Dillon	15,511
11 October 1980	15th	Aston Villa	H	L	1–2	Worthington pen	33,879
18 October 1980	14th	Manchester City	A	W	1–0	Gemmill pen	30,041
25 October 1980	14th	Stoke City	H	D	1–1	Bertschin	16,535
1 November 1980	11th	Middlesbrough	A	W	2–1	Worthington 2	13,292
8 November 1980	9th	Crystal Palace	H	W	1–0	Bertschin	16,910
11 November 1980	9th	Nottingham Forest	H	W	2–0	Worthington 2	22,433
15 November 1980	10th	Coventry City	A	L	1–2	Curbishley	18,429
22 November 1980	10th	Tottenham Hotspur	H	W	2–1	Curbishley, Ainscow	24,817
29 November 1980	9th	Everton	A	D	1–1	Ainscow	22,274
6 December 1980	10th	Leicester City	H	L	1–2	Scott og	18,479
13 December 1980	12th	Aston Villa	A	L	0–3		41,101
20 December 1980	13th	Ipswich Town	H	L	1–3	Ainscow	16,161
26 December 1980	13th	Leeds United	A	D	0–0		19,214
27 December 1980	14th	Sunderland	H	W	3–2	Gemmill, Bertschin, Worthington	19,005
10 January 1981	14th	Tottenham Hotspur	A	L	0–1		24,909
13 January 1981	14th	Ipswich Town	A	L	1–5	Worthington	21,148
17 January 1981	14th	Southampton	H	L	0–3		16,491
31 January 1981	18th	Manchester United	A	L	0–2		39,081
7 February 1981	17th	Brighton & Hove Albion	H	W	2–1	Evans, Curbishley	13,691
14 February 1981	14th	Liverpool	A	D	2–2	Evans, Ainscow	32,199
20 February 1981	10th	Norwich City	H	W	4–0	Ainscow, Evans 2, Gemmill	14,686
28 February 1981	14th	West Bromwich Albion	A	D	2–2	Worthington, Ainscow	24,848
17 March 1981	12th	Wolverhampton Wanderers	H	W	1–0	Worthington	20,005
21 March 1981	10th	Manchester City	H	W	2–0	Worthington, Evans	16,160
28 March 1981	10th	Stoke City	A	D	0–0		14,624
31 March 1981	11th	Arsenal	A	L	1–2	Worthington	17,431
4 April 1981	11th	Middlesbrough	H	W	2–1	Evans, Broadhurst	12,472
11 April 1981	11th	Crystal Palace	A	L	1–3	Ainscow	11,122
18 April 1981	11th	Sunderland	A	L	0–3		20,158
21 April 1981	13th	Leeds United	H	L	0–2		14,505
25 April 1981	13th	Leicester City	A	L	0–1		13,686
2 May 1981	13th	Everton	H	D	1–1	Evans	12,863

=== League table (part) ===
Final First Division table (part)
Pos	Team	Pld	W	D	L	GF	GA	GD	Pts
11th	Stoke City	42	12	18	12	51	60	−9	42
12th	Manchester City	42	14	11	17	56	59	−3	39
13th	Birmingham City	42	13	12	17	50	61	−11	38
14th	Middlesbrough	42	16	5	21	53	61	−8	37
15th	Everton	42	13	10	19	55	58	−3	36

== FA Cup ==
Round	Date	Opponents	Venue	Result	Score F–A	Scorers	Attendance
Third round	3 January 1981	Sunderland	H	D	1–1	Bertschin	23,098
Third round replay	7 January 1981	Sunderland	A	W	2–1	Bertschin, Evans	27,793
Fourth round	24 January 1981	Coventry City	A	L	2–3	Worthington pen, Ainscow	29,492

== League Cup ==
Round	Date	Opponents	Venue	Result	Score F–A	Scorers	Attendance
Second round 1st leg	26 August 1980	Bristol City	H	W	2–1	Ainscow, Gemmill pen	12,163
Second round 2nd leg	2 September 1980	Bristol City	A	D	0–0		6,958
Third round	23 September 1980	Blackburn Rovers	H	W	1–0	Gallagher	14,580
Fourth round	28 October 1980	Ipswich Town	H	W	2–1	Worthington pen, Ainscow	18,968
Fifth round	2 December 1980	Liverpool	A	L	1–3	Bertschin	30,236

== Appearances and goals ==
Numbers in parentheses denote appearances made as a substitute.
Players marked † left the club during the playing season.
Key to positions: GK – Goalkeeper; DF – Defender; MF – Midfielder; FW – Forward

Players' appearances and goals by competition
Pos.	Nat.	Name	League		FA Cup		League Cup		Total	
Pos.	Nat.	Name	Apps	Goals	Apps	Goals	Apps	Goals	Apps	Goals
GK	ENG	Tony Coton	3	0	1	0	0	0	4	0
GK	ENG	Jeff Wealands	39	0	2	0	5	0	46	0
DF	ENG	Kevan Broadhurst	15	1	0	0	0	0	15	1
DF	ENG	Mark Dennis	19	0	4	0	0	0	23	0
DF	ENG	Joe Gallagher	41	0	3	0	5	1	49	1
DF	ENG	Phil Hawker	11	0	0	0	1	0	12	0
DF	IRL	Dave Langan	42	0	3	0	4	0	49	0
DF	ENG	Terry Lees	2	0	3	0	0	0	5	0
DF	WAL	Malcolm Page	2	0	0	0	1	0	3	0
DF	ENG	Colin Todd	40	0	3	0	5	0	48	0
DF	WAL	Pat Van Den Hauwe	3 (1)	0	0	0	0	0	3 (1)	0
MF	ENG	Alan Ainscow	40	8	3	1	5	2	48	11
MF	ENG	Alan Curbishley	29	6	3	0	4	0	36	6
MF	ENG	Kevin Dillon	38 (1)	2	2	0	4	0	44 (1)	2
MF	SCO	Archie Gemmill	41	3	3	0	5	1	49	4
MF	ENG	Terry Goode	0 (2)	0	0	0	0	0	0 (2)	0
MF	ENG	Ian Handysides	6 (2)	0	0	0	0	0	6 (2)	0
FW	ENG	Keith Bertschin	28 (2)	4	3	2	4	1	34 (2)	7
FW	ENG	Tony Evans	16 (1)	7	0 (1)	1	0	0	16 (2)	8
FW	IRL	Don Givens †	4 (6)	1	0	0	2 (1)	0	6 (7)	1
FW	ENG	Paul Ivey	1 (1)	0	0	0	0	0	1 (1)	0
FW	ENG	Steve Lynex †	6 (8)	1	1	0	1	0	8 (8)	1
FW	ENG	Frank Worthington	36	16	3	1	4	1	43	18

== See also ==
- Birmingham City F.C. seasons

== Sources ==
- Matthews, Tony (1995). Birmingham City: A Complete Record. Derby: Breedon Books. ISBN 978-1-85983-010-9.
- Matthews, Tony (2010). Birmingham City: The Complete Record. Derby: DB Publishing. ISBN 978-1-85983-853-2.
- For match dates, league positions and results: "Birmingham City 1980–1981: Results". Statto Organisation. Archived from the original on 4 March 2016.
- For lineups, appearances, goalscorers and attendances: Matthews (2010), Complete Record, pp. 396–97.
