= 1979–80 Birmingham City F.C. season =

Birmingham City F.C.
1979–80 season
- Chairman: Keith Coombs
- Manager: Jim Smith
- Ground: St Andrew's
- Football League Second Division: 3rd (promoted)
- FA Cup: Fifth round (eliminated by Tottenham Hotspur)
- League Cup: Third round (eliminated by Exeter City)
- Anglo-Scottish Cup: Group stage
- Top goalscorer: League: Keith Bertschin (12); All: Keith Bertschin (18)
- Highest home attendance: 33,863 vs Notts County, 3 May 1980
- Lowest home attendance: 7,631 vs Bristol City, Anglo-Scottish Cup, 4 August 1979
- Average home league attendance: 20,427
Home colours

The 1979–80 Football League season was Birmingham City Football Club's 77th in the Football League and their 32nd in the Second Division, to which they were relegated in 1978–79. They finished in third position in the 22-team division, level on points with Chelsea but with a better goal difference, so were promoted to the First Division for 1980–81. They entered the 1979–80 FA Cup in the third round proper and lost to Tottenham Hotspur in the fifth, and were eliminated from the third round of the League Cup by Exeter City. They also entered the Anglo-Scottish Cup, but failed to progress past the group stage.

Twenty-one players made at least one appearance in nationally organised first-team competition, and there were eleven different goalscorers. Midfielder Alan Curbishley appeared in all 51 first-team games of the season – defender Joe Gallagher missed only one – and Keith Bertschin was the club's top scorer with 18 goals, of which 12 were scored in the league.

== Football League Second Division ==
The league programme did not end on the same day for all clubs. Although Birmingham were in second place after their last match, on 3 May, the last Second Division fixture was played nine days later, they were overtaken by Sunderland, and finished third.

Date	League position	Opponents	Venue	Result	Score F–A	Scorers	Attendance
18 August 1979	15th	Fulham	H	L	3–4	Evans, Dillon, Bertschin	19,330
22 August 1979	22nd	Sunderland	A	L	0–2		25,877
25 August 1979	16th	Cardiff City	A	W	2–1	Evans 2	11,465
1 September 1979	16th	Bristol Rovers	H	D	1–1	Dillon	15,320
8 September 1979	13th	Chelsea	A	W	2–1	Lynex, Curbishley	17,711
15 September 1979	7th	Charlton Athletic	H	W	1–0	Lynex	16,155
22 September 1979	9th	Orient	A	D	2–2	Lynex, Curbishley	5,550
29 September 1979	9th	Newcastle United	H	D	0–0		19,967
6 October 1979	11th	Preston North End	A	D	0–0		10,772
9 October 1979	6th	Sunderland	H	W	1–0	Lynex	18,960
13 October 1979	11th	Wrexham	A	L	0–1		13,693
20 October 1979	7th	Swansea City	H	W	2–0	Lynex, Gemmill	18,624
27 October 1979	5th	Shrewsbury Town	H	W	1–0	Ainscow	17,869
3 November 1979	5th	Fulham	A	W	4–2	Gemmill pen, Givens 2, Lock og	8,338
10 November 1979	3rd	Cambridge United	H	W	1–0	Lynex	17,120
17 November 1979	6th	Watford	A	L	0–1		14,378
24 November 1979	6th	Luton Town	A	W	3–2	Bertschin 3	13,720
1 December 1979	6th	Leicester City	H	L	1–2	Gallagher	25,748
8 December 1979	6th	Notts County	A	D	1–1	Lynex	11,383
15 December 1979	5th	Burnley	H	W	2–0	Worthington 2	13,997
21 December 1979	6th	Oldham Athletic	A	L	0–1		6,728
29 December 1979	6th	Cardiff City	H	W	2–1	Worthington, Bertschin	16,682
1 January 1980	5th	Queens Park Rangers	H	W	2–1	Ainscow, Gemmill	25,963
12 January 1980	6th	Bristol Rovers	A	L	0–1		9,351
2 February 1980	5th	Charlton Athletic	A	W	1–0	Gemmill	6,821
9 February 1980	5th	Orient	H	W	3–1	Bertschin 3	17,474
20 February 1980	5th	Newcastle United	A	D	0–0		27,069
23 February 1980	4th	Wrexham	H	W	2–0	Dillon, Evans	19,302
29 February 1980	1st	Swansea City	A	W	1–0	Lynex	16,363
8 March 1980	4th	Shrewsbury Town	A	L	0–1		14,801
11 March 1980	1st	Chelsea	H	W	5–1	Broadhurst, Borota og, Dillon, Ainscow 2	27,297
15 March 1980	2nd	Preston North End	H	D	2–2	Gemmill pen, Worthington	19,548
22 March 1980	3rd	Cambridge United	A	L	1–2	Smith og	6,805
29 March 1980	2nd	Watford	H	W	2–0	Bertschin, Gemmill pen	16,582
1 April 1980	2nd	Oldham Athletic	H	W	2–0	Gemmill, Ainscow	17,118
5 April 1980	1st	Queens Park Rangers	A	D	1–1	Dillon	16,609
7 April 1980	1st	West Ham United	H	D	0–0		28,377
12 April 1980	4th	Leicester City	A	L	1–2	Gemmill pen	26,075
19 April 1980	4th	Luton Town	H	W	1–0	Bertschin	23,662
22 April 1980	1st	West Ham United	A	W	2–1	Ainscow, Bertschin	36,167
26 April 1980	2nd	Burnley	A	D	0–0		10,388
3 May 1980	3rd	Notts County	H	D	3–3	Bertschin, Curbishley, Dillon	33,863

=== League table (part) ===
Final Second Division table (part)
Pos	Team	Pld	W	D	L	GF	GA	GD	Pts
1st	Leicester City	42	21	13	8	58	38	+20	55
2nd	Sunderland	42	21	12	9	69	42	+27	54
3rd	Birmingham City	42	21	11	10	58	38	+20	53
4th	Chelsea	42	23	7	12	66	52	+14	53
5th	Queens Park Rangers	42	18	13	11	75	53	+22	49

== FA Cup ==
Round	Date	Opponents	Venue	Result	Score F–A	Scorers	Attendance
Third round	5 January 1980	Southampton	H	W	2–1	Bertschin, Gallagher	24,548
Fourth round	26 January 1980	Middlesbrough	H	W	2–1	Gemmill pen, Bertschin	29,152
Fifth round	16 February 1980	Tottenham Hotspur	A	L	1–3	Bertschin	49,936

== League Cup ==
Round	Date	Opponents	Venue	Result	Score F–A	Scorers	Attendance
Second round 1st leg	28 August 1979	Preston North End	H	W	2–1	Ainscow, Dillon	13,660
Second round 2nd leg	4 September 1979	Preston North End	A	W	1–0	Lynex	11,043
Third round	26 September 1979	Exeter City	H	L	1–2	Ainscow	13,669

== Anglo-Scottish Cup ==
Round	Date	Opponents	Venue	Result	Score F–A	Scorers	Attendance
Group stage	4 August 1979	Bristol City	H	L	0–4		7,631
Group stage	6 August 1979	Plymouth Argyle	A	D	1–1	Bertschin	3,137
Group stage	8 August 1979	Fulham	A	W	5–0	Bertschin 2, Evans, Ainscow, Dillon	2,899

== Appearances and goals ==
Numbers in parentheses denote appearances made as a substitute.
Players with name in italics and marked * were on loan from another club for the whole of their season with Birmingham.
Key to positions: GK – Goalkeeper; DF – Defender; MF – Midfielder; FW – Forward

Players' appearances and goals by competition
Pos.	Nat.	Name	League		FA Cup		League Cup		Anglo-Scottish Cup		Total	
Pos.	Nat.	Name	Apps	Goals	Apps	Goals	Apps	Goals	Apps	Goals	Apps	Goals
GK	ENG	Neil Freeman	2	0	1	0	0	0	2	0	5	0
GK	ENG	Jeff Wealands	40	0	2	0	3	0	1 (1)	0	46 (1)	0
DF	ENG	Kevan Broadhurst	23	1	3	0	0	0	0	0	26	1
DF	SCO	Jimmy Calderwood	1	0	0	0	0	0	3	0	4	0
DF	ENG	Mark Dennis	40	0	2	0	3	0	0	0	45	0
DF	ENG	Joe Gallagher	41	1	3	1	3	0	3	0	50	2
DF	ENG	Terry Lees	9 (1)	0	1	0	1	0	2	0	13 (1)	0
DF	WAL	Malcolm Page	3	0	0	0	1	0	3	0	7	0
DF	ENG	Colin Todd	33 (1)	0	3	0	1	0	0	0	37 (1)	0
DF	ENG	Tony Towers	22	0	0	0	3	0	1	0	26	0
DF	WAL	Pat Van Den Hauwe	1	0	0	0	0	0	2 (1)	0	3 (1)	0
MF	ENG	Alan Ainscow	37	6	3	0	3	2	2	1	45	7
MF	ENG	Alan Curbishley	40 (2)	3	3	0	3	0	3	0	49 (2)	3
MF	ENG	Kevin Dillon	30 (1)	3	0	0	3	1	2 (1)	1	35 (2)	5
MF	SCO	Archie Gemmill	37	8	3	1	3	0	1	0	44	9
MF	SCO	Willie Johnston *	15	0	3	0	0	0	0	0	18	0
MF	ENG	Steve Lynex	20 (10)	8	0 (3)	0	2	1	2	0	24 (13)	9
FW	ENG	Keith Bertschin	34 (3)	12	3	3	1 (1)	0	3	3	41 (4)	18
FW	ENG	Tony Evans	10 (3)	4	0	0	2	0	3	1	15 (3)	5
FW	IRL	Don Givens	7 (3)	2	0	0	1	0	0	0	8 (3)	2
FW	ENG	Frank Worthington	17 (2)	4	3	0	0	0	0	0	20 (2)	4

== See also ==
- Birmingham City F.C. seasons

== Sources ==
- Matthews, Tony (1995). Birmingham City: A Complete Record. Derby: Breedon Books. ISBN 978-1-85983-010-9.
- Matthews, Tony (2010). Birmingham City: The Complete Record. Derby: DB Publishing. ISBN 978-1-85983-853-2.
- For match dates and results: "Birmingham City 1979–1980 : Results". Statto Organisation. Archived from the original on 4 March 2016.
- For lineups, appearances, goalscorers and attendances: Matthews (2010), Complete Record, pp. 394–95.
- For Anglo-Scottish Cup attendances: Matthews (1995), Complete Record, p. 243.
