= Terry Lees =

English footballer

Personal information
- Full name: Terence Lees
- Date of birth: 30 June 1952 (age 74)
- Place of birth: Stoke-on-Trent, England
- Height: 5 ft 8 in (1.73 m)
- Positions: Defender; midfielder

Youth career
- 1968–1969: Stoke City

Senior career*
| Years | Team | Apps | (Gls) |
| 1969–1975 | Stoke City | 24 | (0) |
| 1973 | → Cape Town City (loan) | | |
| 1975 | → Crewe Alexandra (loan) | 6 | (0) |
| 1975 | San Jose Earthquakes | 16 | (1) |
| 1975–1976 | Port Vale | 41 | (2) |
| 1976–1977 | Sparta Rotterdam | 33 | (1) |
| 1977–1979 | Roda JC Kerkrade | 59 | (8) |
| 1979–1981 | Birmingham City | 12 | (0) |
| 1981–1982 | Newport County | 25 | (0) |
| 1982 | Morning Star | | |
| 1982–1984 | DS'79 | 50 | (1) |
| 1984 | Stafford Rangers | | |
| 1984 | Altrincham | | |
| 1984–1985 | Scunthorpe United | 31 | (0) |
| 1985–1986 | Macclesfield Town | 28 | (0) |

Managerial career
- Hanley Town
- Kidsgrove Athletic
- Ball Haye Green
- * Club domestic league appearances and goals

Terence Lees (born 30 June 1952) is an English former footballer who played in the Football League for Stoke City, Crewe Alexandra, Port Vale, Birmingham City, Newport County and Scunthorpe United, in the North American Soccer League for San Jose Earthquakes, and in the Eredivisie for Sparta Rotterdam, Roda JC Kerkrade and DS'79. He also won the National Football League with South African club Cape Town City.

== Personal and later life ==
Terence Lees was born in Stoke-on-Trent on 30 June 1952; his father was a bricklayer, and his mother left the family home when Lees was five. He married Claire. After retiring from football, Lees ran a burger van.

== Playing career ==
Lees joined local club Stoke City as an apprentice in 1968, turning professional in July 1969. Coach Harry Gregg converted him from a striker into a more defensive player. He made his debut as a substitute in a 2–1 defeat at Southampton on 30 January 1971 and made his full debut in a 2–0 win over Manchester City on 24 April. He made five starts and four substitute appearances during the 1969–70 season. He played infrequently throughout his six seasons with the "Potters" as manager Tony Waddington was able to rely on a trusted defence of Jackie Marsh, Denis Smith, Alan Bloor and Mike Pejic. He was an unused substitute in every game of Stoke's run to the 1972 League Cup final, but was not named in the squad for the final itself. He also spent time on loan at South African Cape Town City in 1973, helping Roy Bailey's side to win the National Football League, where he played alongside Geoff Hurst. He also spent time on loan at Crewe Alexandra. In 1975, Lees played 16 games and scored one goal for the San Jose Earthquakes in the North American Soccer League. His wages of £150-a-week in America were more than double his £60-a-week wages at Stoke.

On his return to England, Port Vale paid local rivals Stoke City £3,000 for his services in August 1975. He accepted the move over Peterborough United as he wanted to remain close by to his father, who was ill. He played 47 games over all competitions for the "Valiants", which made him one of the few players to have played for all three local clubs (Stoke, Vale and Crewe); initially home supporters spat on him, though he would win them over with some good performances. In August 1976, he was sold to Dutch side Sparta Rotterdam for £25,000. Lees played 30 games for Sparta Rotterdam in the Eredivisie. He marked World Cup finalist Willem van Hanegem on his debut against AZ Alkmaar. He rejected a move to Feyenoord over personal terms. He considered a move to Brighton & Hove Albion, who instead signed Mark Lawrenson whilst Lees pondered the club's offer. Lees spent two seasons with fellow top-flight club Roda JC Kerkrade following a club record £100,000 move.

In July 1979, he returned to the Midlands and signed for Birmingham City. He found himself behind Mark Dennis, Colin Todd and Kevan Broadhurst in contention for starting places, so played only ten games in the 1979–80 season, which nevertheless contributed to the club's promotion to the First Division. The following season, he understudied the ever-present Dave Langan at right back and played only twice. After two years at Birmingham, in which he played 19 games in all competitions, Lees moved on to Newport County, where he played 25 league games before falling out with assistant manager Bobby Smith.

After an interlude in Hong Kong playing for Morning Star, Lees resumed his career in Dutch football with DS'79 after being signed by former Sparta teammate Pim Verbeek. He made his debut in October 1982, playing on the left wing in a 5–0 win away at Heracles, and in his first season helped the club win the Eerste Divisie title playing a midfield partnership with Gerrie Mühren. His 1983–84 season was less successful: though Lees himself played in 29 of the 34 games, the club finished bottom of the table, and in their last match of the season were beaten 7–2 by Ajax, Marco van Basten scoring five of the seven. He chose to leave the club and return to England despite having a year left on his contract.

After a trial with Blackpool, he later played for Stafford Rangers. He finished his Football League career with Scunthorpe United, whom he joined from Altrincham in September 1984. Frank Barlow persuaded him to join Scunthorpe ahead of Northampton Town. He then played for Macclesfield Town.

== Management career ==
Lees managed non-League clubs in the Staffordshire area after retiring as a player. He took charge at Hanley Town and Kidsgrove Athletic and was assistant manager of Meir K.A. before becoming manager of Ball Haye Green.

== Career statistics ==
Appearances and goals by club, season and competition
| Club | Season | League | | | FA Cup | | League Cup | | Other^{[A]} | | Total | |
| Club | Season | Division | Apps | Goals | Apps | Goals | Apps | Goals | Apps | Goals | Apps | Goals |
|---|---|---|---|---|---|---|---|---|---|---|---|---|
| Stoke City | 1970–71 | First Division | 7 | 0 | 2 | 0 | 0 | 0 | 0 | 0 | 9 | 0 |
| Stoke City | 1971–72 | First Division | 5 | 0 | 0 | 0 | 0 | 0 | 1 | 0 | 6 | 0 |
| Stoke City | 1972–73 | First Division | 8 | 0 | 0 | 0 | 1 | 0 | 0 | 0 | 9 | 0 |
| Stoke City | 1973–74 | First Division | 4 | 0 | 0 | 0 | 0 | 0 | 0 | 0 | 4 | 0 |
| Stoke City | 1974–75 | First Division | 0 | 0 | 0 | 0 | 0 | 0 | 0 | 0 | 0 | 0 |
| Stoke City | Total | | 24 | 0 | 2 | 0 | 1 | 0 | 1 | 0 | 28 | 0 |
| Crewe Alexandra (loan) | 1974–75 | Fourth Division | 6 | 0 | 0 | 0 | 0 | 0 | 0 | 0 | 6 | 0 |
| San Jose Earthquakes | 1975 | NASL | 16 | 1 | — | | — | | — | | 16 | 1 |
| Port Vale | 1975–76 | Third Division | 41 | 2 | 3 | 0 | 3 | 0 | 0 | 0 | 47 | 2 |
| Sparta Rotterdam | 1976–77 | Eredivisie | 33 | 1 | | | | | | | 33 | 1 |
| Roda JC Kerkrade | 1977–78 | Eredivisie | 28 | 3 | | | | | | | 28 | 3 |
| Roda JC Kerkrade | 1978–79 | Eredivisie | 31 | 5 | | | | | | | 31 | 5 |
| Roda JC Kerkrade | Total | | 59 | 8 | | | | | | | 59 | 8 |
| Birmingham City | 1979–80 | Second Division | 10 | 0 | 1 | 0 | 1 | 0 | 2 | 0 | 14 | 0 |
| Birmingham City | 1980–81 | First Division | 2 | 0 | 3 | 0 | 0 | 0 | 0 | 0 | 5 | 0 |
| Birmingham City | Total | | 12 | 0 | 4 | 0 | 1 | 0 | 2 | 0 | 19 | 0 |
| Newport County | 1981–82 | Third Division | 25 | 0 | 1 | 0 | 1 | 0 | 3 | 1 | 30 | 1 |
| DS'79 | 1982–83 | Eerste Divisie | 21 | 1 | | | | | | | 21 | 1 |
| DS'79 | 1983–84 | Eredivisie | 29 | 0 | | | | | | | 29 | 0 |
| DS'79 | Total | | 50 | 1 | | | | | | | 50 | 1 |
| Scunthorpe United | 1984–85 | Fourth Division | 31 | 0 | 3 | 0 | 1 | 0 | 1 | 0 | 36 | 0 |
| Macclesfield Town | 1985–86 | Northern Premier League | 28 | 0 | 1 | 0 | 0 | 0 | 9 | 0 | 38 | 0 |
| Career total | | | 325 | 13 | 14 | 0 | 7 | 0 | 16 | 1 | 362 | 14 |

A. The "Other" column includes appearances and goals in the Anglo-Scottish Cup, Football League Group Cup and Football League Trophy.

== Honours ==
Cape Town City

- National Football League: 1973

DS'79

- Eerste Divisie: 1982–83
