= Trevor Francis =

English footballer and manager (1954–2023)

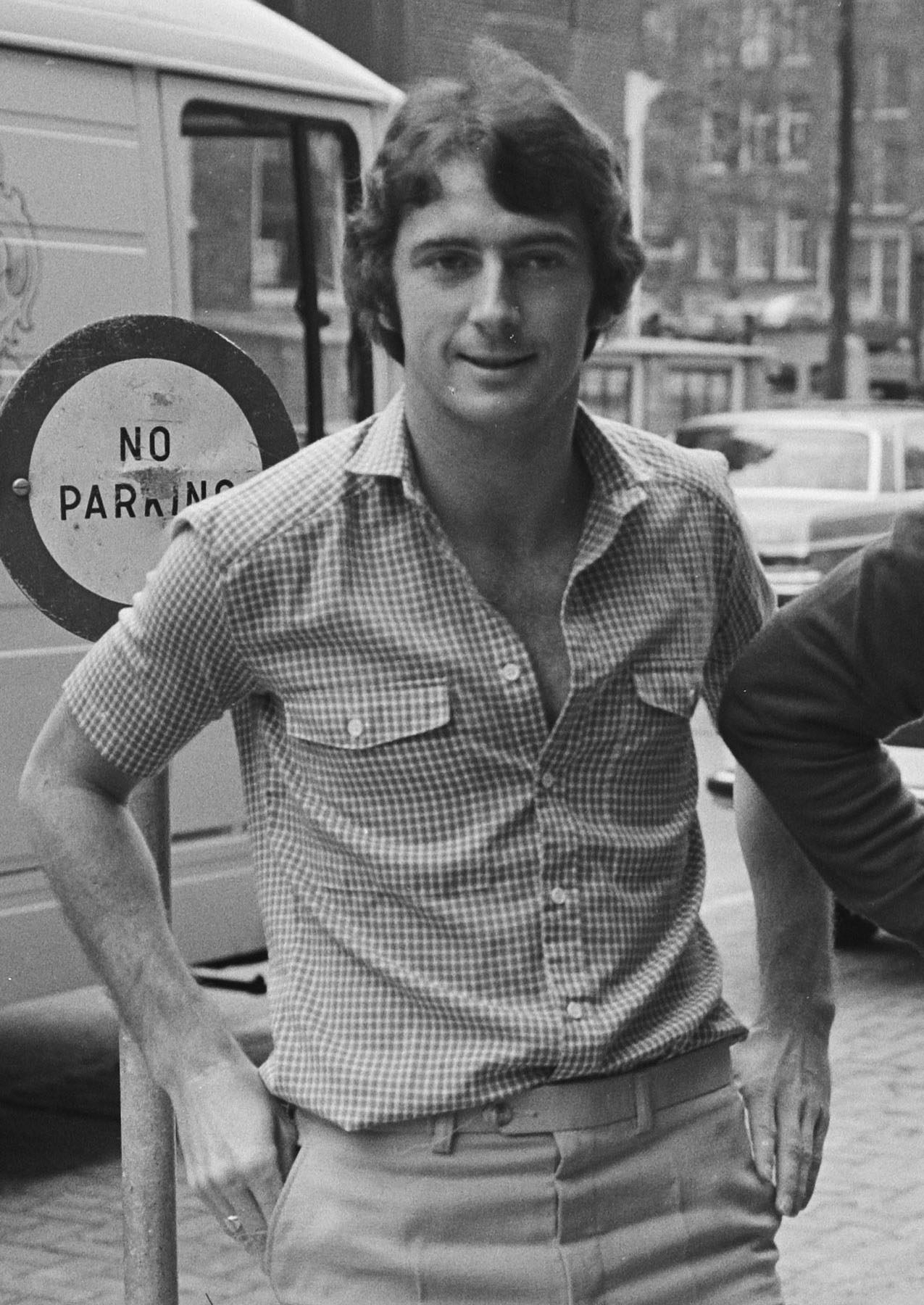
- Francis in 1980

Personal information
- Full name: Trevor John Francis
- Date of birth: 19 April 1954
- Place of birth: Plymouth, England
- Date of death: 24 July 2023 (aged 69)
- Place of death: Marbella, Spain
- Height: 5 ft 10 in (1.78 m)
- Position: Forward

Youth career
- 1969–1970: Birmingham City

Senior career*
Years	Team	Apps	(Gls)
1970–1979	Birmingham City	280	(118)
1978	→ Detroit Express (loan)	19	(22)
1979–1981	Nottingham Forest	70	(28)
1979	→ Detroit Express (loan)	14	(14)
1981–1982	Manchester City	26	(12)
1982–1986	Sampdoria	67	(17)
1986–1987	Atalanta	21	(1)
1987–1988	Rangers	18	(1)
1988–1990	Queens Park Rangers	32	(12)
1988	→ Wollongong City (loan)	3	(2)
1990–1994	Sheffield Wednesday	76	(5)
Total		626	(231)

International career
1971–1972	England Youth	10	(4)
1973–1976	England U23	5	(0)
1977–1986	England	52	(12)

Managerial career
- 1988–1989: Queens Park Rangers
- 1991–1995: Sheffield Wednesday
- 1996–2001: Birmingham City
- 2001–2003: Crystal Palace
- * Club domestic league appearances and goals

Trevor John Francis (19 April 1954 – 24 July 2023) was an English footballer who played as a forward for a number of clubs in England, the United States, Italy, Scotland and Australia. In 1979 he became Britain's first £1 million player following his transfer from Birmingham City to Nottingham Forest. He scored the winning goal for Forest in the 1979 European Cup final against Malmö. He won the European Cup again with the club the following year. At international level, he played for England 52 times between 1976 and 1986, scoring 12 goals, and played at the 1982 FIFA World Cup.

Between 1988 and 2003, Francis was manager of Queens Park Rangers, Sheffield Wednesday, Birmingham City and Crystal Palace.

== Early life and education ==
Trevor John Francis was born on 19 April 1954 in Plymouth, Devon. His father, Roy, was a shift foreman with the local gas board and played football semi-professionally, his mother, Phyllis, did part-time sewing and tailoring, and he had two younger siblings. Francis was educated at Pennycross primary school and Plymouth's Public Secondary School for Boys. As a schoolboy, he was a prolific goalscorer; at 14, he attended a Football Association course at the National Sports Centre at Bisham Abbey, and he joined Birmingham City as a 15-year-old school-leaver.

== Club career ==
=== Birmingham City ===
Francis quickly rose in status, making his debut for Birmingham City's first team in 1970, aged just 16. His talent was noted when, before his 17th birthday, he scored four goals in a match against Bolton Wanderers. He ended his first season with 15 goals from just 22 games. Birmingham City manager at the time, Freddie Goodwin, compared Francis to both Jimmy Greaves and Denis Law.

On 30 October 1976, he scored one of Birmingham's most famous goals, when he turned away from the touchline and cut inside two Queens Park Rangers defenders, constantly being forced backwards, before suddenly unleashing a 25-yard (23 m) shot.

=== Detroit Express ===
Francis negotiated a loan from Birmingham in 1978 to play for the Detroit Express in the North American Soccer League (NASL), where he scored 22 goals in 19 league matches and was named in the NASL first XI alongside Franz Beckenbauer and Giorgio Chinaglia before returning home to the Midlands.

=== Nottingham Forest ===
Nottingham Forest, the reigning First Division champions and League Cup holders managed by Brian Clough, put in a bid for Francis which totalled just over £1 million. No player had ever been sold between English clubs for a seven-figure fee before (the erstwhile record was less than half), and the deal was sealed, with Francis famously being introduced to the media by a manager impatient to play squash; Clough was in his red gym kit and carrying a racquet as he addressed the press conference.

While recognised as the first British million-pound player, the actual transfer fee for the player was £1,150,000, including 15% commission to the Football League. Clough wrote in his autobiography that the fee was £999,999, as he wanted to ensure the million-pound milestone did not go to the player's head; although Francis says that was a tongue-in-cheek remark by Clough.

Nottingham Forest retained the League Cup shortly afterwards without the cup-tied Francis, and made progress in the European Cup to the extent that they reached the semi-finals, although Francis was not eligible to play in the competition until the final. They won their semi-final, and in May 1979 Forest took on Swedish club Malmö in the final in Munich, and a major instalment of the huge investment money was repaid just before half time.

The ball was spread to Forest's winger John Robertson wide on the left and he took on two defenders at once to reach the byline and curl an awkward, outswinging cross towards the far post. Francis had already begun to sprint into position, but even so he had to increase his pace in order to reach the cross as it dropped, and ended up throwing himself low at the ball. He connected with his head and the ball diverted powerfully into the roof of the net. Forest won the match 1–0 and footage of the goal was used in the opening titles to Match of the Day for some years afterwards. A giant picture of Francis stooping to head the ball remains on display in the main entrance and reception area of Forest's City Ground stadium.

Even though the season ended there, Francis duly headed back to Detroit for another summer playing in the NASL, where once again he was named to the first XI alongside Johan Cruyff (Los Angeles Aztecs) and Giorgio Chinaglia (New York Cosmos), despite playing only half the season. In his brief NASL career, Francis scored 36 goals in 33 regular season matches and had 18 assists.

At Nottingham Forest Clough frequently played Francis on the right wing, rather than in his preferred position as a central attacker. Francis was in the side which lost the 1980 League Cup Final to Wolverhampton Wanderers, but missed the European Cup Final against Hamburg due to an injury to his Achilles tendon. Somehow the success of his Forest career never quite reflected his huge fee: he scored only 14 league goals in the 1979–80 season and 6 in the next 18 games that he played for Forest. Although still a regular for England, his Achilles injury prevented him being in the squad for the 1980 European Championships.

=== Manchester City ===
The injury kept Francis out of the game for over six months. He was sold to Manchester City in September 1981, this time for £1.2 million. The deal caused behind-the-scenes friction at Manchester City. During negotiations City chairman Peter Swales informed manager John Bond that the club could not afford the transfer fee. Bond then issued an ultimatum: if Francis did not sign, Bond would resign. Francis made a promising start at the club, scoring two goals against Stoke City on his debut, but over the course of the season he was frequently injured. In total he scored 12 goals in 26 games and made the England squad for the 1982 World Cup.

Back at his club, financial problems were again an issue. Francis' contract gave him a salary of £100,000 plus bonuses, which the club could no longer afford to pay to a player who regularly sustained injuries.

=== Sampdoria ===
Later that summer, Francis was approached by Italian club Sampdoria, who paid Manchester City £700,000 for his services. He helped win the 1984–85 Coppa Italia, in the same team as Scotland midfielder Graeme Souness, by scoring 9 goals in 11 games (top scorer of the Cup). It was the first time that Sampdoria had won the competition.

=== Atalanta ===
Francis joined Atalanta in 1986. He played 21 league games and scored once in his only season, but added two goals in nine games in the Coppa Italia; Atalanta lost the final to Napoli. He was the second Englishman at the Bergamo-based club after Gerry Hitchens, and by the time of his death their only other English-born player was Ademola Lookman.

=== Rangers ===
Francis returned to Britain in September 1987 to join Rangers under Graeme Souness. Numerous English players were brought to the Scottish club by Souness as English clubs had been banned from European competition since the Heysel disaster. Francis cost just £75,000, signed on a "pay-as-you-play" basis, and won the 1987–88 Scottish League Cup, scoring a penalty in the shootout.

=== Queens Park Rangers ===
Francis signed for Queens Park Rangers on a free transfer in March 1988 and helped the team finish fifth in the First Division. He scored 10 goals from 26 appearances in the first half of the 1988–89 season and took over as player-manager in December 1988 when Jim Smith moved to Newcastle United, but a knee injury in January 1989 put an end to his playing season. He marked his return to the field in September 1989 with a hat-trick against Aston Villa, but was replaced as manager by Don Howe in November 1989 and his playing contract was paid up a few days later.

In March 1989, QPR player Martin Allen left the preparations for a game away at Newcastle United in order to witness the birth of his son. Francis fined him two weeks' wages, a decision that was condemned by the British press and discussed in Parliament. Francis expressed remorse, but never recovered the trust of Allen, who left for West Ham at the end of the season.

During his time at Queens Park Rangers, Francis completed a brief loan in 1988 with an Australian National Soccer League team, Wollongong City, as part of businessman Harry Michaels' attempt to market football in Australia. Michaels had previously funded the loans of Alan Brazil and Paul Mariner, whom Francis was to replace, and had discussions with Norman Whiteside, Nigel Clough and Michel Platini about playing for the New South Wales-based team.

=== Sheffield Wednesday ===
Francis left QPR in February 1990 to play for Sheffield Wednesday; despite gaining a good reputation amongst supporters, he could not help the club avoid relegation to the second tier under manager Ron Atkinson for the 1990–91 season. However, that season he helped Wednesday win the League Cup, although he was a non-playing substitute in the final, and also gained promotion back to the top flight.

== International career ==
Francis played for England 52 times between 1977 and 1986 and scored 12 goals. In 1977, he was given his first England cap by Don Revie, in a 2–0 loss against the Netherlands. After missing out on Euro 1980 due to an Achilles injury, Francis was named in the England squad for the 1982 World Cup in Spain. In the first round of the tournament, he scored in the group games against Czechoslovakia and Kuwait. England were eliminated after goalless draws against both the host nation and West Germany. In spring 1986, he made his 52nd and final appearance for England in a victory over Scotland, and was subsequently not selected for the 1986 World Cup in Mexico.

== Managerial career ==
=== Sheffield Wednesday ===
After the departure of Ron Atkinson, Francis took over as manager of Sheffield Wednesday with popular support from club and supporters. He guided Wednesday to third-place finish in 1992, and seventh in the next two seasons in the new FA Premier League. The following year, Wednesday reached the FA Cup and League Cup finals, losing both to Arsenal, the former after a replay. In 1994, Francis finally retired as a player, shortly before his 40th birthday. Wednesday also reached the semi finals of the League Cup that season. He was dismissed as manager a year later after Wednesday finished 13th in the Premiership.

In January 1992, Francis brought former French international Eric Cantona back from a poor discipline enforced hiatus in his career by inviting him for a trial at Sheffield Wednesday. However, as the snowy conditions meant that he could only evaluate Cantona on AstroTurf, Francis requested an extension to the trial to see whether Cantona could play on grass. An outraged Cantona walked out on The Owls and was signed (without a trial) by Leeds United, inspiring first them and then Manchester United to success. In a 2012 interview Francis said that he had agreed to take Cantona on as a favour to Francis' former agent, Dennis Roach, and Michel Platini, who he knew from his time playing in Italy, when they approached him about taking on Cantona, and that it was intended as an opportunity for Cantona to put himself in the "shop window": Wednesday had only recently been promoted back to the top flight, with most of the squad still being on Second Division-level wages, and the club could not afford to sign him.

=== Birmingham City ===
12 months after being sacked by Sheffield Wednesday, Francis returned to Birmingham City as manager in May 1996, with the club having just finished 15th in Division One (the equivalent of the old Second Division, now known as the EFL Championship). Among his first signings were a host of former top division title winners - Steve Bruce, Mike Newell and Gary Ablett, as well as former FA Cup winner Barry Horne and club record signing Paul Furlong.

After a disappointing start in 1996-97, Francis lifted the Blues away from the relegation battle to finish 10th. His second season brought a seventh place finish, with the Blues only missing out on the playoffs on goals scored. The next three seasons saw the Blues finally make the breakthrough into the playoffs, only to lose in the semi finals each time.

Francis led Blues to the 2001 League Cup Final, in which they lost on penalties to Liverpool. He was dismissed in October that year. BBC Sport wrote "Francis the player was legendary. Francis the manager is the nearly man".

=== Crystal Palace ===
Francis returned to management with weeks of leaving Birmingham, taking over as manager of Crystal Palace on 30 November 2001. He was appointed by Crystal Palace chairman, Simon Jordan to replace Steve Bruce who had resigned as Crystal Palace manager with the intention of taking the manager's role at Birmingham City. Litigation had followed with Bruce being placed on "gardening leave". Of the appointment Jordan said, "The last two or three weeks have not been easy. I'm bored of Steve Bruce and Birmingham and what I'm interested in is Trevor Francis and Crystal Palace." At the time Francis said that he had turned down four jobs before accepting the role at Crystal Palace. Under his managership, Palace defeated a Gerard Houllier-managed Liverpool in an FA Cup fourth round replay at Anfield in February 2003 and beat Palace's main rivals, Brighton & Hove Albion, 5–0 in October 2002. However, after the team's second failure to achieve promotion to the Premier League, Simon Jordan dismissed him, stating: "People know I am very unhappy with the selection of our players under Francis. We have a very strong squad and we should have done a lot better this season – a lot of lessons need to be learned from injury prevention and transfer policy."

Francis never returned to management after his exit from Selhurst Park.

== Personal life ==
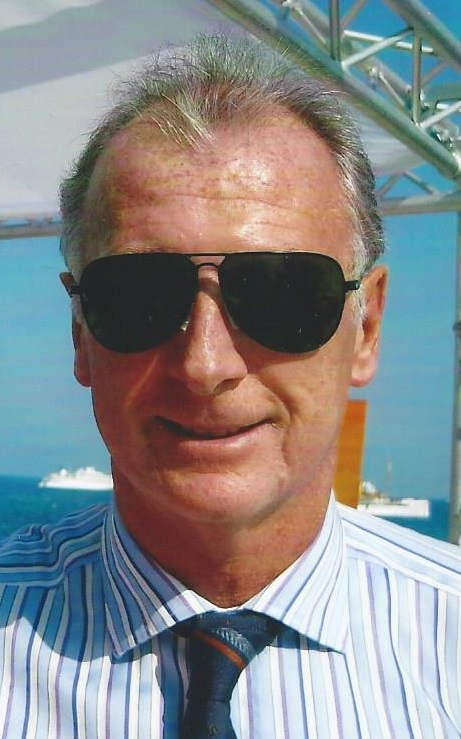
Francis in 2009

Francis married Helen Allcard in 1974. The couple had two children, Matthew and James. On 5 April 2017, it was reported that Helen Francis had died.

On 13 April 2012, Francis was reported to be recovering in hospital from a suspected heart attack.

Francis died of a heart attack at his home near Marbella, Spain, on 24 July 2023. He was 69.

== Career statistics ==
=== Club ===
Appearances and goals by club, season and competition
Club	Season	League			National cup (Note: Includes FA Cup, Coppa Italia, Scottish Cup)		League cup (Note: Includes Football League Cup, Scottish League Cup)		Europe		Other		Total	
Club	Season	Division	Apps	Goals	Apps	Goals	Apps	Goals	Apps	Goals	Apps	Goals	Apps	Goals
Birmingham City	1970–71	Second Division	22	15	2	0	2	0	—		—		26	15
Birmingham City	1971–72	Second Division	39	12	6 (Note: Includes 1971–72 third-place play-off, which was not played until August 1972)	2	1	0	—		2 (Note: Appearances in Anglo-Italian Cup)	1	48	15
Birmingham City	1972–73	First Division	31	6	1	0	5	2	—		—		37	8
Birmingham City	1973–74	First Division	37	6	2	1	5	1	—		3 (Note: Appearances in Texaco Cup)	1	47	9
Birmingham City	1974–75	First Division	23	13	2	0	1	0	—		2	1	28	14
Birmingham City	1975–76	First Division	35	17	2	1	2	0	—		—		39	18
Birmingham City	1976–77	First Division	42	21	2	0	1	0	—		—		45	21
Birmingham City	1977–78	First Division	42	25	2	2	1	0	—		3 (Note: Appearances in Anglo-Scottish Cup)	2	48	29
Birmingham City	1978–79	First Division	9	3	1	0	1	1	—		—		11	4
Birmingham City	Total		280	118	20	6	19	4	—		10	5	329	133
Detroit Express (loan)	1978	NASL	19	22	—		—		—		3 (Note: Appearances in NASL play-offs)	3	22	25
Nottingham Forest	1978–79	First Division	20	6	—		—		1 (Note: Appearance(s) in European Cup)	1	—		21	7
Nottingham Forest	1979–80	First Division	30	14	2	0	6	0	6 (Note: Four appearances three goals in European Cup, two appearances in European Super Cup)	3	—		44	17
Nottingham Forest	1980–81	First Division	18	6	6	5			1 (Note: Appearance in European Super Cup)	0	1 (Note: Appearance in Intercontinental Cup)	0	26	11
Nottingham Forest	1981–82	First Division	2	2	—		—		—		—		2	2
Nottingham Forest	Total		70	28	8	5	6	0	8	4	1	0	93	37
Detroit Express (loan)	1979	NASL	14	14	—		—		—		2	0	16	14
Manchester City	1981–82	First Division	26	12	2	2	1	0	—		—		29	14
Sampdoria	1982–83	Serie A	14	7	5	1	—		—		—		19	8
Sampdoria	1983–84	Serie A	15	3	7	2	—		—		—		23	5
Sampdoria	1984–85	Serie A	24	6	11	9	—		—		—		35	15
Sampdoria	1985–86	Serie A	14	1	11	1	—		3 (Note: Appearances in European Cup-Winners' Cup)	0	—		28	2
Sampdoria	Total		67	17	34	13	—		3	0	—		104	30
Atalanta	1986–87	Serie A	21	1	9	2	—		—		—		30	3
Rangers	1987–88	Scottish Premier Division	18	0	1	0	2	0	4	0	—		25	0
Queens Park Rangers	1987–88	First Division	9	0	—		—		—		—		9	0
Queens Park Rangers	1988–89	First Division	19	7	1	0	5	3	—		1 (Note: Appearance in Football League Centenary Trophy)	0	26	10
Queens Park Rangers	1989–90	First Division	4	5	0	0	3	0	—		—		7	5
Queens Park Rangers	Total		32	12	1	0	8	3	—		1	0	42	15
Wollongong City (loan)	1988	National Soccer League	3	2	—		—		—		—		3	2
Sheffield Wednesday	1989–90	First Division	12	0	—		—		—		—		12	0
Sheffield Wednesday	1990–91	Second Division	38	4	3	1	6	1	—		1 (Note: Appearance in Full Members' Cup)	0	48	6
Sheffield Wednesday	1991–92	First Division	20	1	1	0	1	2	—		—		22	3
Sheffield Wednesday	1992–93	Premier League	5	0	0	0	1	0	1 (Note: Appearance in UEFA Cup)	0	—		7	0
Sheffield Wednesday	1993–94	Premier League	1	0	0	0	0	0	—		—		1	0
Sheffield Wednesday	Total		76	5	4	1	8	3	1	0	1	0	90	9
Career total			626	231	79	29	44	10	16	4	18	8	783	282

=== International ===
Appearances and goals by national team and year
National team	Year	Apps	Goals
England	1977	7	1
England	1978	5	1
England	1979	5	2
England	1980	1	1
England	1981	5	0
England	1982	10	5
England	1983	8	2
England	1984	4	0
England	1985	6	0
England	1986	1	0
Total		52	12

Scores and results list England's goal tally first, score column indicates score after each Francis goal.

List of international goals scored by Trevor Francis
No.	Date	Venue	Opponent	Score	Result	Competition	Ref.
1	30 March 1977	Wembley Stadium, London, England	Luxembourg	2–0	5–0	1978 FIFA World Cup qualification	
2	24 May 1978	Wembley Stadium, London, England	Hungary	3–0	4–1	Friendly	
3	17 October 1979	Windsor Park, Belfast, Northern Ireland	Northern Ireland	1–0	5–1	UEFA Euro 1980 qualification	
4	17 October 1979	Windsor Park, Belfast, Northern Ireland	Northern Ireland	3–1	5–1	UEFA Euro 1980 qualification	
5	26 March 1980	Camp Nou, Barcelona, Spain	Spain	2–0	2–0	Friendly	
6	27 April 1982	Ninian Park, Cardiff, Wales	Wales	1–0	1–0	1981–82 British Home Championship	
7	20 June 1982	Estadio San Mamés, Bilbao, Spain	Czechoslovakia	1–0	2–0	1982 FIFA World Cup Group stage	
8	25 June 1982	Estadio San Mamés, Bilbao, Spain	Kuwait	1–0	1–0	1982 FIFA World Cup Group stage	
9	22 September 1982	Idrætsparken, Copenhagen, Denmark	Denmark	1–0	2–2	UEFA Euro 1984 qualification	
10	22 September 1982	Idrætsparken, Copenhagen, Denmark	Denmark	2–1	2–2	UEFA Euro 1984 qualification	
11	27 April 1983	Wembley Stadium, London, England	Hungary	1–0	2–0	UEFA Euro 1984 qualification	
12	19 June 1983	Olympic Park Stadium, Melbourne, Australia	Australia	1–0	1–1	Friendly	

== Managerial statistics ==
Managerial record by team and tenure
Team	From	To	Record				
Team	From	To	P	W	D	L	Win %
Queens Park Rangers	14 December 1988	27 November 1989	48	15	17	16	31.3
Sheffield Wednesday	17 June 1991	20 May 1995	216	89	68	59	41.2
Birmingham City	10 May 1996	15 October 2001	290	139	70	81	47.9
Crystal Palace	30 November 2001	18 April 2003	78	28	22	28	35.9
Total			632	271	177	184	42.9

== Honours ==
=== Player ===
Birmingham City

- Football League Second Division runner-up: 1971–72

Detroit Express

- American Conference Central Division: 1978

Nottingham Forest

- European Cup: 1978–79, 1979–80
- European Super Cup: 1979
- Football League Cup runner-up: 1979–80

Sampdoria

- Coppa Italia: 1984–85

Rangers

- Scottish League Cup: 1987–88

Sheffield Wednesday

- Football League Cup: 1990–91

Individual

- PFA Team of the Year: 1976–77 First Division, 1977–78 First Division, 1981–82 First Division
- Onze d'Argent: 1979
- Coppa Italia top scorer: 1984–85 (9 goals)

=== Manager ===
Sheffield Wednesday

- FA Cup runner-up: 1992–93
- Football League Cup runner-up: 1992–93

Birmingham City

- Football League Cup runner-up: 2000–01

Individual

- Premier League Manager of the Month: December 1993
