= Keith Bertschin =

English footballer (born 1956)

Personal information
- Full name: Keith Edwin Bertschin
- Date of birth: 25 August 1956 (age 70)
- Place of birth: Enfield, England
- Height: 6 ft 1 in (1.85 m)
- Position: Striker

Senior career*
Years	Team	Apps	(Gls)
1972–1973	Barnet		
1973–1977	Ipswich Town	32	(8)
1977–1981	Birmingham City	118	(29)
1981–1984	Norwich City	114	(29)
1982	→ Jacksonville Tea Men (loan)	14	(3)
1984–1987	Stoke City	88	(29)
1987–1988	Sunderland	36	(7)
1988–1990	Walsall	55	(9)
1990–1991	Chester City	19	(0)
1991–1992	Aldershot		
1992–1993	Solihull Borough		
1993–1994	Evesham United		
1994	Barry Town		
1994–1995	Worcester City		
1995–1996	Hednesford Town		
1996	Tamworth		
1996–1998	Stafford Rangers		
Total		476	(114)

International career
1975	England Youth	9	(7)
1977–1978	England U21	4	(0)

Managerial career
- 2016: Solihull Moors
- * Club domestic league appearances and goals

Keith Edwin Bertschin (born 25 August 1956) is an English former professional football player and coach.

A striker, Bertschin began his professional career with Ipswich Town (1973–1977), before playing for Birmingham City (1977–1981), Norwich City (1981–1982; 1982–1984), Stoke City (1984–1987), Sunderland (1987–1988), Walsall (1988–1990), Chester City (1990–1991) and Aldershot (1991–1992). He also played non-League football and had a short spell playing in the United States with the Jacksonville Tea Men in 1982.

== Playing career ==
Bertschin was born in Enfield and began his career with Barnet before joining Ipswich Town in 1973. He scored seven times for England's Youth team in nine appearances. He made a perfect start to professional football scoring on his debut scoring the winning goal in a 2–1 victory over Arsenal in April 1976. He scored again two days later against West Ham United. He became a full member of the squad in 1976–77 scoring six goals in 30 appearances as Ipswich finished in 3rd position. Bertschin joined Birmingham City in July 1977 for a fee of £135,000. He spent four seasons at St Andrew's making 143 appearances scoring 41 goals and helped the club gain promotion in 1979–80. His goal against Arsenal at Highbury in October 1977 won The Big Match Golden Goal award for 1977–78.

Bertschin joined Norwich City in August 1981 and helped the Canaries gain promotion to the First Division in 1981–82. He scored twice against his old club Birmingham in a 5–1 victory earning Norwich their first victory of the 1982–83 season. He spent the summer of 1982 playing in the United States for Jacksonville Tea Men.

Bertschin left Carrow Road in November 1984 to join Stoke City. Stoke were rock bottom of the table when Bertschin joined in 1984–85 and he could do little to prevent the side failing to an embarrassing relegation which saw Stoke go down with a then record low points tally. In 1985–86 had a fine season top-scoring with 23 goals, 19 coming in the league and he won the player of the year award. Unfortunately for Stoke he was their only consistent goalscorer and the side finished in a mid-table position of 10th. He scored eight goals in 27 appearances in 1986–87 before he was sold to Sunderland in March 1987. He couldn't prevent Sunderland being relegated but played a major role in 1987–88 which saw the Black Cats win the Third Division title. Bertschin ended his professional career at Walsall, Chester City and Aldershot before dropping into non-league football.

Bertschin played for Solihull Borough, Evesham United and was a member of the Barry Town team which won the Welsh Cup in 1994 with a 2–1 victory against Cardiff City. He then went on to play for Worcester City, Hednesford Town, Tamworth and finally Stafford Rangers.

== Coaching career ==
After retiring from playing, he worked as an agent for a number of players before his appointment to the coaching staff at Birmingham City. In November 2007, when Birmingham manager Steve Bruce left to join Wigan Athletic, Bertschin and other members of Birmingham's backroom staff accompanied him. In June 2009, when Bruce moved on to Sunderland, Bertschin again followed. On 29 June 2012 it was announced that Bertschin had taken up the post of first team coach at Hull City. On 2 August 2016, the club sacked Bertschin from his position of first team coach.

Bertschin took temporary charge of Solihull Moors on 9 November 2016 following the departure of Marcus Bignot. He was then assistant manager at Solihull and was then appointed first-team coach of the Solihull Moors Ladies team.

== Career statistics ==
Appearances and goals by club, season and competition
Club	Season	League			FA Cup		League Cup		Other (Note: Includes Anglo-Scottish Cup, Football League play-offs, Football League Trophy and Full Members Cup.)		Total	
Club	Season	Division	Apps	Goals	Apps	Goals	Apps	Goals	Apps	Goals	Apps	Goals
Ipswich Town	1975–76	First Division	3	2	0	0	0	0	0	0	3	2
Ipswich Town	1976–77	First Division	29	6	0	0	1	0	0	0	30	6
Ipswich Town	Total		32	8	0	0	1	0	0	0	33	8
Birmingham City	1977–78	First Division	42	11	2	3	1	0	3	0	48	14
Birmingham City	1978–79	First Division	9	2	1	0	1	0	0	0	11	2
Birmingham City	1979–80	Second Division	37	12	3	3	2	0	3	3	45	18
Birmingham City	1980–81	First Division	30	4	3	2	4	1	0	0	37	7
Birmingham City	Total		118	29	9	8	10	1	6	3	143	41
Norwich City	1981–82	Second Division	36	12	3	0	1	0	0	0	40	12
Norwich City	1982–83	First Division	40	8	5	4	4	2	0	0	49	14
Norwich City	1983–84	First Division	33	7	5	1	6	2	0	0	44	10
Norwich City	1984–85	First Division	5	2	0	0	0	0	0	0	5	2
Norwich City	Total		114	29	13	5	11	4	0	0	138	38
Jacksonville Tea Men (loan)	1982	NASL	14	3	–		–		–		14	3
Stoke City	1984–85	First Division	25	2	2	0	0	0	0	0	27	2
Stoke City	1985–86	Second Division	42	19	1	0	3	2	3	2	49	23
Stoke City	1986–87	Second Division	21	8	4	0	1	0	1	0	27	8
Stoke City	Total		88	29	7	0	4	2	4	2	103	33
Sunderland	1986–87	Second Division	11	2	0	0	0	0	2	1	13	3
Sunderland	1987–88	Third Division	25	5	1	0	2	0	2	2	30	7
Sunderland	Total		36	7	1	0	2	0	4	3	43	10
Walsall	1988–89	Second Division	20	0	1	0	3	0	1	1	25	1
Walsall	1989–90	Third Division	35	9	3	2	1	0	5	3	44	13
Walsall	1990–91	Fourth Division	0	0	0	0	0	0	1	0	1	0
Walsall	Total		55	9	4	2	4	0	7	4	71	14
Chester City	1990–91	Third Division	19	0	3	1	0	0	0	0	22	1
Career total			476	114	37	16	32	7	21	12	566	149

== Honours ==
Birmingham City

- Football League Second Division third-place promotion: 1979–80

Norwich City

- Football League Second Division third-place promotion: 1981–82

Sunderland

- Football League Third Division: 1987–88

Barry Town

- Welsh Cup: 1993–94

Individual

- Stoke City Player of the Year: 1986
