= Steve Fox (footballer) =

English footballer (1958–2012)

Personal information
- Full name: Stephen Douglas Fox
- Date of birth: 17 February 1958
- Place of birth: Tamworth, England
- Date of death: 1 December 2012 (aged 54)
- Height: 5 ft 7 3/4 in (1.72 m)
- Position: Winger

Youth career
- Aston Villa
- Tamworth

Senior career*
Years	Team	Apps	(Gls)
1975–1978	Birmingham City	29	(1)
1978–1982	Wrexham	141	(10)
1982–1984	Port Vale	74	(6)
1984–1985	Chester City	33	(4)
- Rhyl
- Llangollen
- Tamworth
- * Club domestic league appearances and goals

Stephen Douglas Fox (17 February 1958 – 1 December 2012) was an English professional footballer who played as a winger. He made 278 appearances in the Football League playing for Birmingham City, Wrexham, Port Vale and Chester City.

He was voted Wrexham's Player of the Year in 1981 and played for the club in the 1979 Welsh Cup final. While with Port Vale, he was promoted out of the Fourth Division in 1982–83 and was also voted onto the PFA Team of the Year.

== Career ==
=== Birmingham City ===
Fox was born in Tamworth, Staffordshire. He began his football career as a schoolboy with Aston Villa before playing for local club Tamworth F.C. He joined Birmingham City as an apprentice in 1975, signing professional forms in February 1976. He made his Football League debut a year later, as a substitute in a 2–1 defeat away to West Bromwich Albion in the First Division. Despite The Times' reporter's view in April 1978 that "Fox looks a fine prospect", the player was unable to hold down a regular first-team place, and joined Second Division club Wrexham in December the same year after manager Arfon Griffiths paid out a £95,000 fee.

=== Wrexham ===
He spent nearly four years with Wrexham, during which time he helped the club to reach the fifth round of the FA Cup on two occasions and scored in the final of the Welsh Cup in 1979, in which Wrexham lost to Shrewsbury Town on aggregate. He also played and scored for the club in the European Cup Winners' Cup. At the end of the 1980–81 season he was voted the club's Player of the Year. However, he was allowed to leave the club due to pressing financial problems at Wrexham. In 2008, the sports editor of the Wrexham Evening Leader selected Fox as a substitute in his "greatest Wrexham team ever".

=== Port Vale ===
Fox joined Port Vale in October 1982 after being signed by manager John McGrath as a replacement for the outgoing Mark Chamberlain. On 29 January 1983, he claimed three assists and scored the other goal in a 4–1 win over Mansfield Town at Vale Park. He was a regular first-team player in 1982–83, scoring three goals in 35 games, and was included in the PFA select Fourth Division team for that season as the "Valiants" were promoted in third place. He also was a regular the following season, scoring three goals in 47 games, but issued a transfer request and left on a free transfer. He had fallen out with new boss John Rudge, though he later admitted his regret at leaving the club. Rudge said that he "was a skilful wide man who would always create a lot of chances".

Fox followed John McGrath to Chester City in 1984–85 and 1985–86, although he would not feature for the club again after the opening game of the latter campaign against Halifax Town. His contract was terminated in October 1985 after an argument with new manager Harry McNally. This marked the end of his professional career and he moved into non-League football with Rhyl (of the Northern Premier League), Llangollen and former club Tamworth.

== Style of play ==
Fox was a pacey winger.

== Later life ==
After retiring as a player, Fox became a landscape gardener. Fox and wife Helen had two children: Matthew and Daniel. Fox was diagnosed with lung cancer in April 2012, and was given six months to live by doctors. He died on 1 December 2012.

== Career statistics ==
Appearances and goals by club, season and competition
Club	Season	League			FA Cup		Other		Total	
Club	Season	Division	Apps	Goals	Apps	Goals	Apps	Goals	Apps	Goals
Birmingham City	1976–77	First Division	4	1	0	0	0	0	4	1
Birmingham City	1977–78	First Division	11	0	0	0	0	0	11	0
Birmingham City	1978–79	First Division	14	0	0	0	0	0	14	0
Birmingham City	Total		29	1	0	0	0	0	29	1
Wrexham	1978–79	Second Division	21	1	3	0	0	0	24	1
Wrexham	1979–80	Second Division	38	6	4	0	4	1	46	7
Wrexham	1980–81	Second Division	38	6	5	1	0	0	43	7
Wrexham	1981–82	Second Division	38	1	4	0	4	0	46	1
Wrexham	1982–83	Third Division	6	0	0	0	2	0	8	0
Wrexham	Total		141	14	16	1	10	1	167	16
Port Vale	1982–83	Fourth Division	34	3	1	0	0	0	35	3
Port Vale	1983–84	Third Division	40	3	1	0	6	0	47	3
Port Vale	Total		74	6	2	0	6	0	82	6
Chester City	1984–85	Fourth Division	32	4	1	1	3	0	36	5
Chester City	1985–86	Fourth Division	1	0	0	0	0	0	1	0
Chester City	Total		33	4	1	1	3	0	37	5
Career total			277	25	19	2	19	1	315	28

== Honours ==
Individual

- Wrexham A.F.C. Player of the Year: 1981
- PFA Fourth Division Team of the Year: 1982–83

Wrexham

- Welsh Cup runner-up: 1979

Port Vale

- Football League Fourth Division third-place promotion: 1982–83
