= 1981–82 Manchester City F.C. season =

English football club season

Manchester City
1981–82 season
- Manager: John Bond
- Stadium: Maine Road
- First Division: 10th
- FA Cup: Fourth Round
- Football League Cup: Fourth Round
- Top goalscorer: League: Kevin Reeves (13); All: Trevor Francis (14)
- Highest home attendance: 52,031 vs Manchester United; 10 October 1981
- Lowest home attendance: 21,139 vs Northampton Town; 11 November 1981
- Average home league attendance: 34,063 (4th highest in league)

The 1981–82 season was Manchester City's 80th season of competitive football and 62nd season in the top division of English football. In addition to the First Division, the club competed in the FA Cup and Football League Cup. On New Years Day of 1982, the club were top of the league, but after poor second half of the season which saw them win only 5 league games in 22, the club ended up finishing 10th.

== First Division ==
=== League table ===
Pos	Team	Pld	W	D	L	GF	GA	GD	Pts	Qualification or relegation
8	Everton	42	17	13	12	56	50	+6	64	
9	West Ham United	42	14	16	12	66	57	+9	58	
10	Manchester City	42	15	13	14	49	50	−1	58	
11	Aston Villa	42	15	12	15	55	53	+2	57	Qualification for the European Cup first round (Note: Aston Villa qualified for the European Cup first round as the 1981–82 European Cup winners.)
12	Nottingham Forest	42	15	12	15	42	48	−6	57	

Source: World Football
Rules for classification: 1) Points; 2) Goal difference; 3) Goals scored

=== Results summary ===
Overall								Home						Away					
Pld	W	D	L	GF	GA	GD	Pts	W	D	L	GF	GA	GD	W	D	L	GF	GA	GD
42	15	13	14	49	50	−1	58	9	7	5	32	23	+9	6	6	9	17	27	−10

=== Results ===
Date	Opponents	H / A	Venue	Result F – A	Scorers	Attendance
29 August 1981	West Bromwich Albion	H	Maine Road	2–1	Hutchison, Tueart	36,187
1 September 1981	Notts County	A	Meadow Lane	1–1	McDonald	14,546
5 September 1981	Stoke City	A	Victoria Ground	3–1	Francis (2), Boyer	25,256
12 September 1981	Southampton	H	Maine Road	1–1	Reeves	42,003
19 September 1981	Birmingham City	A	St Andrews	0–3		20,109
23 September 1981	Leeds United	H	Maine Road	4–0	Tueart (2), Reeves (2)	35,077
26 September 1981	Tottenham Hotspur	H	Maine Road	0–1		39,085
3 October 1981	Brighton & Hove Albion	A	Goldstone Ground	1–4	Reeves	18,300
10 October 1981	Manchester United	H	Maine Road	0–0		52,037
17 October 1981	Arsenal	A	Highbury	0–1		25,470
24 October 1981	Nottingham Forest	H	Maine Road	0–0		23,881
31 October 1981	Everton	A	Goodison Park	1–0	Tueart	31,305
7 November 1981	Middlesbrough	H	Maine Road	3–2	Francis, Reeves, Tueart	32,025
21 November 1981	Swansea City	H	Maine Road	4–0	Reeves (2), Tueart (2)	34,644
28 November 1981	Ipswich Town	A	Portman Road	0–2		20,476
5 December 1981	Aston Villa	H	Maine Road	1–0	Tueart	32,487
12 December 1981	Coventry City	A	Highfield Road	1–0	Tueart	12,398
19 December 1981	Sunderland	H	Maine Road	2–3	Francis (2)	29,462
26 December 1981	Liverpool	A	Anfield	3–1	Hartford, Bond, Reeves	37,929
28 December 1981	Wolverhampton Wanderers	H	Maine Road	2–1	Hartford, Francis	40,298
9 January 1982	Stoke City	H	Maine Road	1–1	Francis	31,951
30 January 1982	Birmingham City	H	Maine Road	4–2	Francis (2), Reeves (2)	28,438
2 February 1982	West Ham United	A	Boleyn Ground	1–1	Bond	26,552
6 February 1982	Southampton	A	The Dell	1–2	McDonald	22,645
13 February 1982	Brighton & Hove Albion	H	Maine Road	4–0	Francis, Reeves, McDonald, Stevens	30,038
20 February 1982	Tottenham Hotspur	A	White Hart Lane	0–2		46,181
27 February 1982	Manchester United	A	Old Trafford	1–1	Reeves	57,872
6 March 1982	Arsenal	H	Maine Road	0–0		30,287
10 March 1982	Leeds United	A	Elland Road	1–0	Reeves	20,797
13 March 1982	Nottingham Forest	A	City Ground	1–1	Caton	20,927
20 March 1982	Everton	H	Maine Road	1–1	Bond	33,002
27 March 1982	Middlesbrough	A	Ayresome Park	0–0		11,709
3 April 1982	West Ham United	H	Maine Road	0–1		30,875
10 April 1982	Liverpool	H	Maine Road	0–5		40,112
12 April 1982	Wolverhampton Wanderers	A	Molineux Stadium	1–4	McDonald	14,891
17 April 1982	Swansea City	A	Vetch Field	0–2		19,212
21 April 1982	West Bromwich Albion	A	The Hawthorns	1–0	Francis	11,703
24 April 1982	Ipswich Town	H	Maine Road	1–1	Hartford	30,329
1 May 1982	Aston Villa	A	Villa Park	0–0		22,150
5 May 1982	Notts County	H	Maine Road	1–0	Power	24,443
8 May 1982	Coventry City	H	Maine Road	1–3	Francis	27,580
15 May 1982	Sunderland	A	Roker Park	0–1		26,167

== FA Cup ==
Date	Round	Opponents	H / A	Venue	Result F – A	Scorers	Attendance
2 January 1981	3rd Round	Cardiff City	H	Maine Road	3–1	Francis (2), McDonald	31,547
23 January 1982	4th Round	Coventry City	H	Maine Road	1–3	Bond	31,216

== League Cup ==
=== Results ===
Date	Round	Opponents	H / A	Venue	Result F – A	Scorers	Attendance
7 October 1981	2nd Round 1st Leg	Stoke City	H	Maine Road	2–0	Smith (og), Hartford	23,146
28 October 1981	2nd Round 2nd Leg	Stoke City	A	Victoria Ground	0 – 2 (9–8 on pens)		17,373
11 November 1981	3rd Round	Northampton Town	H	Maine Road	3–1	McDonald, Tueart (2)	21,139
1 December 1981	4th Round	Barnsley	A	Oakwell	0–1		33,792
