= Trevor Dark =

English footballer

Personal information
- Full name: Trevor Charles Dark
- Date of birth: 29 January 1961 (age 65)
- Place of birth: Morden, England
- Height: 5 ft 9 in (1.75 m)
- Position: Winger

Youth career
- Arsenal
- 1977–1979: Birmingham City

Senior career*
Years	Team	Apps	(Gls)
1979–1981	Birmingham City	5	(1)
1981	Hendon	12	(5)
1981–198?	Carshalton Athletic		(25)
–	Fisher Athletic		
–	Tooting & Mitcham United		
- * Club domestic league appearances and goals

Trevor Charles Dark (born 29 January 1961) is an English former professional footballer who played in the Football League for Birmingham City. He played as a winger.

As a schoolboy Dark was associated with Arsenal, but when he left school in 1977 he joined Birmingham City as an apprentice, turning professional two years later. He made his debut as an 18-year-old when he came on as substitute for Stewart Barrowclough in a 1–0 home defeat to Leeds United in the First Division on 10 February 1979. He started the next two games, and made a further two substitute appearances later on in the 1978–79 season, at the end of which Birmingham were relegated; his progress was not improved by an attempt to convert him from winger to full back. He left Birmingham in 1981 for non-league football in the London area, spending time with Hendon, Carshalton Athletic, whom he joined early in the 1981–82 season, Fisher Athletic and Tooting & Mitcham United.
