= Terry Goode =

English footballer (born 1961)

Personal information
- Full name: Terence Joseph Goode
- Date of birth: 29 October 1961 (age 65)
- Place of birth: Islington, England
- Position: Winger

Youth career
- 1977–1979: Birmingham City

Senior career*
Years	Team	Apps	(Gls)
1979–1982	Birmingham City	2	(0)
1982–198?	Kettering Town	26	(5)
- * Club domestic league appearances and goals

Terence Joseph Goode (born 29 October 1961) is an English former professional footballer who played in the Football League for Birmingham City and for Kettering Town in the Alliance Premier League.

Goode was born in Islington, London. When he left school in 1977, he joined Birmingham City as an apprentice, and turned professional two years later. A pacy winger, Goode made his debut in the First Division in the penultimate game of the 1980–81 season, on 25 April 1981 away at Leicester City, when he came on as substitute to replace Pat Van Den Hauwe. The arrival of wingers Bud Brocken and Toine van Mierlo restricted his chances of first-team football, and in August 1982 he joined Kettering Town of the Alliance Premier League.

Goode is a nephew of England international Charlie George.
