= Andy Needham =

English footballer

Personal information
- Full name: Andrew Paul Needham
- Date of birth: 13 September 1955 (age 71)
- Place of birth: Oldham, England
- Height: 5 ft 11 in (1.80 m)
- Position: Forward

Youth career
- 1971–1973: Birmingham City

Senior career*
Years	Team	Apps	(Gls)
1973–1976	Birmingham City	3	(1)
1976–1977	Blackburn Rovers	5	(0)
1977–1980	Aldershot	95	(29)
- * Club domestic league appearances and goals

Andrew Paul Needham (born 13 September 1955) is an English former professional footballer who scored 30 goals from 103 appearances in the Football League playing for Birmingham City, Blackburn Rovers and Aldershot. He played as a forward.

== Career ==
Needham was born in Oldham, Lancashire. When he left school in 1971, he joined Birmingham City as an apprentice, and turned professional two years later. He made his debut in the First Division on 20 March 1976, deputising for Peter Withe in a 1–1 draw at home to Coventry City, came on as substitute to score in the next game, and started the next. Those were the only first-team appearances he made for Birmingham. He signed for Second Division club Blackburn Rovers in the 1976 close season, but after only five league appearances he moved on again in March 1977, this time to Aldershot of the Fourth Division.

At Aldershot he formed a good partnership with fellow new arrival John Dungworth. Dungworth was a prolific goalscorer – 58 league goals from 105 games, compared with Needham's 29 from 95 – but Needham's contribution was described by teammate Alex McGregor thus:

I know John Dungworth was the star, but Needham was such a great partner for him because he used to run and take players away from John to score the goals. Andy never got the credit he deserved because he was a wonderful player and a wonderful lad as well.

A hip injury forced Needham's retirement from League football in 1980 at the age of 24, and he became a taxi driver.
