= Steve Smith (footballer, born 1957) =

English footballer

Personal information
- Full name: Stephen John Smith
- Date of birth: 12 June 1957 (age 69)
- Place of birth: Lydney, England
- Position: Goalkeeper

Youth career
- Cardiff City
- 1973–1975: Birmingham City

Senior career*
Years	Team	Apps	(Gls)
1975–1978	Birmingham City	2	(0)
1978–1982	Bradford City	105	(0)
1982–1983	Crewe Alexandra	54	(0)
1983–19??	Trowbridge Town		

International career
1975	England Youth	2	(0)

Managerial career
- 1984–19??: Trowbridge Town
- * Club domestic league appearances and goals

Stephen John Smith (born 12 June 1957) is an English former professional footballer who made 161 appearances in the Football League playing for Birmingham City, Bradford City and Crewe Alexandra.

Smith was born in Lydney, Gloucestershire. As a schoolboy he was associated with Cardiff City, but when he left school in 1973, he joined Birmingham City as an apprentice. He was capped by England at youth level in 1975, and turned professional with Birmingham in the same year. In November 1975 Smith saved a penalty kick from Kenny Dalglish in a friendly match against Celtic celebrating the centenary of the Birmingham club. He made his debut in the First Division on 13 March 1976 as an 18-year-old, standing in for Dave Latchford in a 1–0 defeat at home to Liverpool. He kept his place for the next game, but inconsistency meant he was never more than a reserve goalkeeper.

In March 1978 Smith joined Bradford City of the Third Division for a fee of £5,000. Relegated at the end of the 1977–78 season, Smith ended his Bradford City career four years and 105 league games later with the club newly promoted back to the Third Division. He went on to 15 months and 54 league games back in the Fourth Division with Crewe Alexandra, before returning nearer home to non-league football with Trowbridge Town. Three months after joining as a player, Smith took over as Trowbridge manager as well.
