= Paul Ivey =

English footballer

Personal information
- Full name: Paul Henry Winspear Ivey
- Date of birth: 1 April 1961 (age 65)
- Place of birth: Westminster, England
- Height: 5 ft 11 in (1.80 m)
- Position: Forward

Youth career
- 1977–1979: Birmingham City

Senior career*
| Years | Team | Apps | (Gls) |
| 1979–1982 | Birmingham City | 7 | (0) |
| 1982 | Kettering Town | 3 | (0) |
| 1982–1983 | Chesterfield | 6 | (0) |
- Karlskrona AIF
- Kalmar AIK
- Vasalunds IF
- * Club domestic league appearances and goals

Paul Henry Winspear Ivey (born 1 April 1961) is an English former professional footballer who played in the Football League for Birmingham City and Chesterfield. He also played briefly for Kettering Town, and in Sweden for Karlskrona AIF, Kalmar AIK – where he made a name for himself by scoring the winner in the 1983 local derby against their "bigger" neighbours Kalmar FF – and Vasalunds IF. He was born in Westminster and played as a forward.
