= Tony Want =

English footballer

Personal information
- Full name: Anthony George Want
- Date of birth: 13 December 1948 (age 77)
- Place of birth: Hackney, London, England
- Height: 5 ft 8 in (1.73 m)
- Position: Defender

Youth career
- 1964–1965: Tottenham Hotspur

Senior career*
Years	Team	Apps	(Gls)
1965–1972	Tottenham Hotspur	50	(0)
1972–1978	Birmingham City	101	(2)
1975	→ Philadelphia Atoms (loan)	19	(0)
1978–1981	Minnesota Kicks	99	(0)
1979–1981	Minnesota Kicks (indoor)	25	(5)
- * Club domestic league appearances and goals

Anthony George Want (born 13 December 1948) is an English former professional footballer who played as a defender. He played more than 150 games in the First Division of the Football League for Tottenham Hotspur and Birmingham City, and spent time on loan to the Philadelphia Atoms of the North American Soccer League (NASL) in 1975, before continuing his NASL career in 1978 with Minnesota Kicks.

== Honours ==
Tottenham Hotspur

- Anglo-Italian League Cup: 1971

Philadelphia Atoms

- NASL All-star Second Team 1975
