= Dave Latchford =

English footballer

Personal information
- Full name: David Barry Latchford
- Date of birth: 9 April 1949 (age 77)
- Place of birth: Birmingham, England
- Height: 6 ft 2 in (1.88 m)
- Position: Goalkeeper

Youth career
- 1964–1966: Birmingham City

Senior career*
Years	Team	Apps	(Gls)
1966–1978	Birmingham City	206	(0)
1978–1979	Motherwell	8	(0)
1979–1980	Bury	2	(0)
1980–1981	Barnsley	0	(0)
1981–1983	Redditch United		
1983–1985	Cheltenham Town		
1985	East Worle		
- * Club domestic league appearances and goals

David Barry Latchford (born 9 April 1949) is an English former footballer who made 208 appearances in the Football League and 8 in the Scottish League playing as a goalkeeper. He is the older brother of former England international striker Bob Latchford and Celtic goalkeeper Peter Latchford.

== Life and career ==
Latchford was born in Kings Heath, Birmingham. He joined Birmingham City from school in 1964 and signed professional forms once he turned 17. He was called up for the England Youth squad but was not capped; the other goalkeeper in the squad was Peter Shilton. He kept goal for Birmingham in the FA Youth Cup final of 1967, in which they were beaten by Sunderland.

Latchford made his League debut in April 1969 in a 2–1 win at Bury, but with Jim Herriot, Paul Cooper and Mike Kelly also at the club it took another four years for him to establish himself as undisputed first choice. Even then, manager Freddie Goodwin brought in Welsh international Gary Sprake, but Latchford soon regained his first team place, eventually losing it permanently when new manager Willie Bell signed Jimmy Montgomery. Latchford won the club's Player of the Year award in 1973. He left for Motherwell in 1978, followed by spells at Bury, Barnsley, and in non-League football.

After retiring from playing football he became a funeral director, and later became superintendent of cemeteries in Solihull, while coaching for a time at Solihull Borough.

== Honours ==
Birmingham City

- FA Youth Cup runners-up: 1966–67
- Second Division runners-up: 1971–72
