= Tony Towers =

English footballer

Personal information
- Full name: Mark Anthony Towers
- Date of birth: 13 April 1952 (age 74)
- Place of birth: Manchester, England
- Height: 5 ft 8 1/2 in (1.74 m)
- Position: Midfielder

Senior career*
Years	Team	Apps	(Gls)
1968–1974	Manchester City	122	(10)
1974–1977	Sunderland	108	(19)
1977–1980	Birmingham City	92	(4)
1981–1983	Montreal Manic	80	(9)
1981–1982	Montreal Manic (indoor)	15	(5)
1983–1984	Tacoma Stars (indoor)	26	(4)
1984	Tampa Bay Rowdies	9	(0)
1984	Vancouver Whitecaps	8	(0)
1984–1985	Rochdale	2	(0)
Total		461	(51)

International career
1967	England Schoolboys	6	(0)
1969–1970	England Youth	7	(2)
1972–1976	England U23	7	(0)
1976	England	3	(0)
- * Club domestic league appearances and goals

Mark Anthony Towers (born 13 April 1952) is an English former professional footballer who played as a midfielder for Manchester City, Sunderland, Birmingham City and Rochdale. He represented England at schoolboy, youth, under-23 and senior level.

== Life and career ==
Towers made his professional debut five days after his seventeenth birthday in April 1969, playing for Manchester City in a 3–0 defeat against Southampton. He made a handful of appearances the following season, and scored his first goal, against Leeds United, in one of them. Towards the end of the season, he had a run in the first team, and was part of the team which won the 1970 European Cup Winners' Cup scoring the winner in extra time against Portuguese club Athletico De Coimbria en route to the final. He became a first team regular in the 1970–71 season, acting as a utility player. He played as City won the 1972 FA Charity Shield. In 1972, under Malcolm Allison's management, Towers settled into a midfield role, usually wearing the number 11 shirt. He was part of the Manchester City side for the 1974 League Cup Final, but the final proved to be his penultimate game for the Manchester club, as two weeks later he transferred to Sunderland in an exchange deal involving Dennis Tueart and Mick Horswill.

Towers made his Sunderland debut against Fulham in March 1974. His performances at Sunderland resulted in him receiving an England call-up in 1976 for the British Home Championship. He made appearances in the matches against Wales and Northern Ireland, and added a third cap two weeks later in a friendly against Italy.

In the 1977 close season Towers joined Birmingham City for a fee of £140,000. He made his Birmingham debut on 20 August 1977 in a 4–1 defeat to Manchester United. He made 92 League appearances for the club, the last coming in 1979–80. In 1981, Towers moved to the Montreal Manic of the North American Soccer League (NASL). He remained with Montreal through the 1983 season. He then began the 1984 season with the Tampa Bay Rowdies before being traded to the Vancouver Whitecaps, and then finishing his career back in England with Rochdale.

== Honours ==
Manchester City

- FA Charity Shield: 1972
- European Cup Winners' Cup: 1969–70
- Football League Cup runner-up: 1973–74

Individual

- PFA Team of the Year: 1975–76 Second Division
