= Terry Hibbitt =

English footballer (1947–1994)

Personal information
- Full name: Terence Arthur Hibbitt
- Date of birth: 1 December 1947
- Place of birth: Bradford, England
- Date of death: 5 August 1994 (aged 46)
- Place of death: Newcastle upon Tyne, England
- Height: 5 ft 6 in (1.68 m)
- Position: Midfielder

Youth career
- 1962–1965: Leeds United

Senior career*
Years	Team	Apps	(Gls)
1963–1971	Leeds United	63	(11)
1971–1975	Newcastle United	138	(7)
1975–1978	Birmingham City	110	(11)
1978–1981	Newcastle United	90	(5)
1981–1986	Gateshead	130	(7)
Total		531	(41)

International career
1986	England National Game XI	1	(0)

Managerial career
- 1986: Gateshead
- * Club domestic league appearances and goals

Terence Arthur Hibbitt (1 December 1947 – 5 August 1994) was an English footballer who played for Leeds United, Newcastle United and Birmingham City. His brother Kenny was also a professional footballer. Hibbitt died of cancer in 1994, aged just 46.

During his time at Leeds he played in the second leg of the 1968 Inter-Cities Fairs Cup Final as they defeated Ferencváros on aggregate. He also made 12 appearances (and scored 3 goals) as they won the First Division in 1968–69.

== Gateshead ==
Hibbitt went on to play non-league football with Gateshead until 1986, during which time he also coached the team. He made 130 appearances in all competitions for Gateshead, scoring seven goals.

== Honours ==
Leeds United

- First Division: winner 1968–69
- Fairs Cup: winner 1967–68

Newcastle United

- FA Cup runner-up: 1973–74
