= Alan Ainscow =

English footballer

Personal information
- Date of birth: 15 July 1953 (age 73)
- Place of birth: Bolton, England
- Height: 5 ft 6 1/2 in (1.69 m)
- Position: Midfielder

Senior career*
Years	Team	Apps	(Gls)
1971–1978	Blackpool	192	(28)
1978–1981	Birmingham City	108	(16)
1981–1983	Everton	28	(3)
1982–1983	→ Barnsley (loan)	2	(0)
1983–1984	Eastern AA		
1984–1986	Wolverhampton Wanderers	58	(5)
1986–1989	Blackburn Rovers	65	(5)
1989–1990	Rochdale	20	(0)
1990	Horwich RMI		
Total		473	(57)
- * Club domestic league appearances and goals

Alan Ainscow (born 15 July 1953) is an English former professional footballer who made more than 450 appearances in the Football League.

== Playing career ==
Born in Bolton, Lancashire, Ainscow began his career with Blackpool as an apprentice, making his debut when then-Seasiders manager, Bob Stokoe, picked him to play in the 1971 Anglo-Italian Cup. Ainscow played in the competition's final, on 12 June 1971 against Bologna at the Stadio Renato Dall'Ara, which Blackpool won 2–1 after extra time. Still without a league appearance, Ainscow played the whole game before being substituted prior to the end of extra time due to exhaustion. The following month he signed his first professional contract with the club.

His league debut came at the start of the 1971–72 season when he scored in a Second Division match against Swindon Town at Bloomfield Road.

Ainscow played again in the Anglo-Italian Cup in 1972. He scored one goal in Blackpool's 10–0 victory over Lanerossi Vicenza on 10 June 1972 at Bloomfield Road, as Blackpool again reached the final, this time losing out 3–1 to A.S. Roma at the Stadio Olimpico in Rome in front of a crowd of 75,000.

It took a while for him to become a regular in the Blackpool first team; though after the departure of Tommy Hutchison, he became almost an ever-present in the line-up.

Ainscow could play on either flank, although he later found himself lying deeper. In the 1972–73 season, he was the club's joint top scorer with Alan Suddick. Also that same season he scored his only hat-trick, when Blackpool beat local rivals Preston North End 3–0 at Deepdale on 19 December 1972.

In July 1978, after 192 league appearances for Blackpool and 28 goals, he was transferred to First Division club Birmingham City for £40,000. He made his debut on 19 August 1978 in a 1–0 defeat to Manchester United at Old Trafford, helped the club gain promotion in the 1979–80 season, and was their Player of the Year the following season.

In August 1981, he joined Everton for a fee of £250,000. After a brief loan spell at Barnsley, he moved to Hong Kong in 1983 to play for Eastern AA. He returned to England in 1984 to play for Wolverhampton Wanderers, before moving to Blackburn Rovers in 1986, where the following year he was part of the team that won the Full Members Cup after a 1–0 victory over Charlton Athletic at Wembley.

In 1989, he moved to Rochdale, and in 1990 he moved into non-League football with Horwich RMI.

== Coaching career ==
After a long spell out of the game, Ainscow was appointed as joint coach to the under-17 team of Burscough in August 2005.

== Honours ==
Blackpool

- Anglo-Italian Cup: 1971

Blackburn Rovers

- Full Members' Cup: 1986–87
