= Willie Bell =

Scottish footballer (1937–2023)

Personal information
- Full name: William John Bell
- Date of birth: 3 September 1937
- Place of birth: Johnstone, Renfrewshire, Scotland
- Date of death: 21 March 2023 (aged 85)
- Position: Left back

Senior career*
Years	Team	Apps	(Gls)
1958–1960	Queen's Park	54	(2)
1960–1967	Leeds United	204	(15)
1967–1969	Leicester City	49	(0)
1969–1970	Brighton & Hove Albion	44	(1)
Total		351	(18)

International career
1966	Scotland	2	(0)

Managerial career
- 1975–1977: Birmingham City
- 1977–1978: Lincoln City
- 1979–2001: Liberty Flames
- * Club domestic league appearances and goals

William John Bell (3 September 1937 – 21 March 2023) was a Scottish football player and manager. He played as a left back for Queen's Park, Leeds United, Leicester City, Brighton & Hove Albion and represented Scotland.

== Playing career ==
Bell was born in Johnstone, Renfrewshire. After starting his career with Queen's Park, he played more than 200 league games for Leeds United in the 1960s. Leeds had many hard men but Bell was only cautioned once with a booking in over 200 games for Leeds. Norman Hunter said of him "Willie Bell was one of the bravest men I have seen in my life. He never blinked, he never flinched, he just went for it." The Definitive History of Leeds United published a small biography of Bell titled Willie Bell – Hewn of Scottish granite saying he was "a consistent force at left back for Leeds between 1962 and 1967" as well as being "one of a clutch of old hands amongst a squad of novices as United sprinted to the top of the English game". Bell played in the 1965 FA Cup final and multiple European club competitions for Leeds.

At international level, Bell represented Scotland multiple times at various levels including being called up twice for full-international duty. His International career included a 1–1 draw with Brazil in 1966 at Hampden Park. Bell had one of the stronger outings that day, effectively shutting Jairzinho out of the match.

== Coaching career ==
After retiring from playing, Bell managed Birmingham City and Lincoln City, and then moved to the United States, where he coached the Liberty University Flames in Lynchburg, Virginia. Bell spent 21 seasons coaching at Liberty, compiling a 198-149-40 record overseeing the Flames transition from the NAIA to NCAA Division II and eventually NCAA Division I status in 1987. Bell received a Doctorate Degree from Liberty University upon his retirement and was later inducted into the Liberty University Flames Hall of Fame.

== Personal life and death ==
Bell was a devout Christian and an ordained minister, who together with wife Mary founded a ministry which visits prisons in England and the United States. He wrote an autobiography of his life in 2014 called "The Light at the End of the Tunnel".

Bell died following a stroke on 21 March 2023, at the age of 85.

== Honours ==
Leeds United

- Football League Second Division: 1963–64
- FA Cup runner-up: 1964–65
- Inter-Cities Fairs Cup runner-up: 1966–67

Individual

- Liberty Athletics Hall of Fame: 2011
