= Kevin Dillon (English footballer) =

English footballer

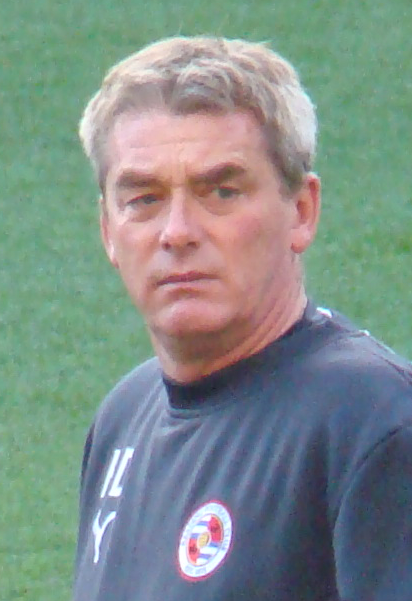

Personal information
- Full name: Kevin Paul Dillon
- Date of birth: 18 December 1959 (age 66)
- Place of birth: Sunderland, England
- Height: 5 ft 11 in (1.80 m)
- Position: Midfielder

Senior career*
Years	Team	Apps	(Gls)
1977–1983	Birmingham City	186	(15)
1983–1989	Portsmouth	215	(45)
1989–1991	Newcastle United	62	(0)
1991–1993	Reading	101	(4)
1993–1995	Stevenage Borough	12	(2)
1995–1996	Yeovil Town	41	(4)
1996–1997	Fareham Town		
Total		617	(70)

International career
1977	England Youth	1	(0)
1980	England U21	1	(0)

Managerial career
- 2003: Reading (caretaker manager)
- 2003-2009: Reading (assistant manager)
- 2009–2011: Aldershot Town
- * Club domestic league appearances and goals

Kevin Paul Dillon (born 18 December 1959) is an English former professional footballer born in Sunderland. He played in the Football League for Birmingham City, Portsmouth, Newcastle United and Reading, and was capped once for England under-21. He was first-team manager of League Two club Aldershot Town from November 2009 to January 2011.

== Playing career ==
Dillon began his football career as an apprentice at Birmingham City and signed pro forms in July 1977. He made his debut four months later against Leicester City, when he was the last player to be given a debut by Sir Alf Ramsey. In the 1980–81 season Dillon made his only England under-21 appearance, against Romania.

After 186 league appearances, he left St Andrew's in March 1983 and joined Third Division club Portsmouth. He was involved in Portsmouth's Third Division title run-in that season and he also played his part, as Portsmouth finished fourth in Second Division in both the 1984–85 and 1985–86 seasons. Portsmouth were finally promoted to the First Division in the 1986–87 season, when they finished as runners-up to Derby County. Pompey only stayed in the top flight for one season, as they finished 19th and were relegated. Dillon had made 206 league appearances for Portsmouth before leaving Fratton Park in July 1989.

Dillon joined Newcastle United and in his first season there, they finished third in the Second Division, before losing out to Sunderland in the play-off semi-finals.

In the summer of 1991, Dillon joined Reading on a free transfer. He spent three years at Elm Park and won the Division Two title in the 1993–94 season before joining Stevenage Borough. He was also both the youth and reserve team manager whilst at Stevenage Borough. He then joined Yeovil Town and finally had a brief spell at Fareham Town at the end of the 1996–97 season.

== Management career ==
Dillon returned to Reading in 1995 and held a number of roles within Reading's academy. He was also reserve team manager before he replaced Martin Allen as Alan Pardew's assistant in November 2001. Under the guidance of the management duo, Reading were promoted to Division One after finishing as runners-up to Brighton & Hove Albion in the 2001–02 season. Pardew resigned in September 2003 and Dillon stepped in as the caretaker manager, until Steve Coppell was appointed in October 2003. At this point Dillon reverted to his role as the number two. Dillon passed his UEFA Pro Licence in 2004 and in the 2005–06 season Reading won the Championship with a record of 106 points. In their first season in the Premier League Reading finished 8th. In May 2007, Dillon followed Coppell's lead in committing himself to Reading for a further two seasons. They were relegated back to the Championship the next season and in May 2009 following the resignation of Coppell, Dillon alongside other first-team coach Wally Downes, left Reading following the team's failure to gain promotion back to the Premier League.

On 9 November 2009, Dillon was confirmed as the new manager of Aldershot Town, succeeding Wycombe Wanderers-bound Gary Waddock. His contract was to run until the end of the 2010–11 season. Against all odds he led the club to the 2009–10 playoffs with a game to spare after a run of just one defeat in ten games. The club's sixth-place finish is still their highest ever league finish to date. Despite such a successful campaign, Dillon made several changes to his squad for the start of the 2010–11 season. He brought in no fewer than ten new faces, including arguably the most eye catching deal of the summer in League Two when he completed the signing of Glen Little from Sheffield United. Despite all the transfer activity, The Shots made a solid start and lost just one of their opening nine league games, as well as progressing through to the second round of the Football League Trophy for the first time in the club's history. But on 10 January 2011, after a run of just two wins in the previous ten League games and with attendances declining, Dillon and assistant Gary Owers left the club by mutual agreement.

== Honours ==
Reading

- Football League Second Division: 1993–94
