= Gary Emmanuel =

Welsh footballer

Personal information
- Full name: John Gary Emmanuel
- Date of birth: 1 February 1954
- Place of birth: Swansea, Wales
- Height: 5 ft 9 in (1.75 m)
- Position: Midfielder

Youth career
- 1970–1971: Birmingham City

Senior career*
Years	Team	Apps	(Gls)
1971–1978	Birmingham City	71	(6)
1978–1981	Bristol Rovers	65	(2)
1981–1984	Swindon Town	111	(8)
1984–1985	Newport County	12	(0)
1985	Bristol City	2	(0)
1985–1989	Swansea City	111	(5)
–	Merthyr Tydfil		
–	Ton Pentre		
–	Llanelli		

International career
1974–1975	Wales U-23	1	(0)

Managerial career
- 1993: Haverfordwest County
- * Club domestic league appearances and goals

John Gary Emmanuel (born 1 February 1954) is a former Wales under-23 international footballer who played as a midfielder. He made 372 appearances in the Football League, playing for Birmingham City, Bristol Rovers, Swindon Town, Newport County, Bristol City and Swansea City.

After his Football League career finished, he went on to play for several non-league clubs in Wales, and had a brief spell as manager of Haverfordwest County, while working for the Post Office.

== Family ==
His father, Len was a Wales schoolboy international who played at left back for Swansea Town and Newport County. His uncle, Tom Emanuel played at left-back for Swansea Town and Southampton in the 1930s and 1940s.
