= Joe Gallagher (footballer) =

English footballer (born 1955)

Personal information
- Full name: Joseph Anthony Gallagher
- Date of birth: 11 January 1955 (age 71)
- Place of birth: Liverpool, England
- Height: 6 ft 2 in (1.88 m)
- Position: Centre half

Youth career
- –1970: Liverpool
- 1970–1972: Birmingham City

Senior career*
Years	Team	Apps	(Gls)
1972–1981	Birmingham City	286	(17)
1979	→ RoRe (loan)	7	(3)
1981–1982	Wolverhampton Wanderers	31	(0)
1982–1983	West Ham United	9	(0)
1983–1987	Burnley	47	(3)
1983	→ Halifax Town (loan)	4	(0)
1984	→ Padiham (loan)		
1994–1995	Kings Heath		

International career
1980	England B	1	(0)
- 1991–1992: Atherstone United
- 1994–1995: Kings Heath
- * Club domestic league appearances and goals

Joseph Anthony Gallagher (born 11 January 1955) is an English former professional footballer who played as a centre-half for Birmingham City and various other clubs. He was a hard-working, competitive defender, good in the air (though less good on the ground), and his authority on the field was such that he was first chosen to captain the Birmingham side at the age of only 19.

== Biography ==
Gallagher was born in Liverpool, and began his football career as a schoolboy with home-town club Liverpool When he left school at 15 he signed for Birmingham City as a trainee. He turned professional on his 17th birthday and made his first team debut in October 1973 against Arsenal at Highbury. He made over 20 appearances in his debut season, and from then on hardly missed a game until a broken leg sustained in a car accident kept him out for several months. He scored on his return to first team duty in December 1977, and for the remainder of his Birmingham career he was virtually ever-present.

It was due in no small part to Gallagher's partnerships with the likes of Kenny Burns and Colin Todd in the Birmingham defence that the club kept its First Division status for all but his last season with them. In 1980–81 he helped them gain promotion back to the top flight, from which they had been relegated the previous year, and was awarded a testimonial match against Aston Villa in recognition of ten years' service. Also that season he was capped for England B in a 1–0 win against Australia at his home ground of St Andrew's. He left Birmingham having made 335 appearances and scored 23 goals.

Gallagher joined fellow First Division club Wolverhampton Wanderers for a fee of £350,000 before the 1981–82 season. Birmingham were unable to profit from the sale because when Wolves were declared bankrupt in 1982 they still owed most of the fee. Gallagher left Wolves in acrimonious circumstances. Already in the reserves despite being one of the club's highest paid players, his contract was cancelled by the club, citing his failure to turn up for an official team photograph, though the player believes this was an excuse for cutting costs.

After two months unemployed he signed for West Ham United for the remainder of the 1982–83 season. He then moved on to Burnley, where within months of signing he was sent on loan to Fourth Division Halifax Town. It appeared that his fitness was no longer adequate to cope with the demands of League football. Despite only playing eight first-team games in his first three years with the club, in 1986–87 he played a full season, starting 41 games in the League and playing a significant part in Burnley retaining their Football League status. He retired at the end of that season, when his contract at Burnley expired, at the relatively young age of 32.

He went on to manage several non-league clubs in the Midlands, and had a spell as community liaison officer with Birmingham City. He later worked for Land Rover and part-time for the Press Association, and has been involved in corporate hospitality at Birmingham matches. In 2012, Gallagher was one of seven former players elected to Birmingham City's Hall of Fame.

== Honours ==
Birmingham City

- Second Division promotion: 1979–80
