= Malcolm Page (footballer) =

Welsh footballer

Personal information
- Full name: Malcolm Edward Page
- Date of birth: 5 February 1947 (age 79)
- Place of birth: Knucklas, Wales
- Height: 5 ft 9 in (1.75 m)
- Positions: Defender; midfielder

Youth career
- 1964: Birmingham City

Senior career*
Years	Team	Apps	(Gls)
1964–1981	Birmingham City	336	(9)
1981–1982	Oxford United	14	(1)
Total		350	(10)

International career
1971–1979	Wales	28	(0)
- * Club domestic league appearances and goals

Malcolm Edward Page (born 5 February 1947) is a Welsh former professional footballer born in Knucklas, Radnorshire (now Powys), who played as a defender or midfielder. He made 391 appearances and scored 10 goals for Birmingham City in all competitions over a 17-year career, and also played for Oxford United. He won 28 full caps for Wales, which at the time made him Birmingham City's most capped player, a record he held for 25 years until overtaken by Australia's Stan Lazaridis in 2005. He captained both club and country.

In 2012, Page was one of seven former players elected to Birmingham City's Hall of Fame.
