= Kevan Broadhurst =

English footballer, coach, and manager

Personal information
- Full name: Kevan Broadhurst
- Date of birth: 3 June 1959 (age 67)
- Place of birth: Dewsbury, England
- Height: 5 ft 9 1/2 in (1.77 m)
- Position: Defender

Youth career
- 1975–1978: Birmingham City

Senior career*
| Years | Team | Apps | (Gls) |
| 1977–1986 | Birmingham City | 153 | (10) |
| 1979 | → Walsall (loan) | 3 | (0) |

Managerial career
- 1993: Birmingham City (caretaker)
- 1999: Northampton Town (caretaker)
- 2001–2003: Northampton Town
- 2004: Bristol Rovers (caretaker)
- 2006: Walsall
- * Club domestic league appearances and goals

Kevan Broadhurst (born 3 June 1959) is an English former professional footballer, coach and football manager.

Broadhurst was born in Dewsbury, West Yorkshire. He played 173 games for Birmingham City in all competitions and had a three-game loan spell at Walsall before his playing career was cut short due to injury.

His managerial career began in 1999 when he was caretaker manager of Northampton Town following the departure of Ian Atkins from the club. He became full-time manager of Northampton in 2001 for sixteen months.

In 2004 Broadhurst was appointed joint caretaker manager of Bristol Rovers with Russell Osman, and when Ian Atkins joined the club as manager Broadhurst remained as his assistant.

Broadhurst was given the manager's job at Walsall in 2006, but only held the position for 61 days, winning only one of his eleven games in charge.

In 2012, Broadhurst was one of seven former players elected to Birmingham City's Hall of Fame.
