= History of Birmingham City F.C. (1965–present) =

History of an English football club

Businessman Clifford Coombs took over as Birmingham chairman in 1965, and appointed Stan Cullis as manager. Cullis's attractive football took them to cup semi-finals, but league football needed a different approach. Successor Freddie Goodwin produced a team playing skilful, aggressive football that won promotion to the First Division as well as reaching an FA Cup semi-final. Two years later, the club raised money by selling Bob Latchford to Everton for a British record fee of £350,000, but without his goals the team struggled. In 1979, with relegation a certainty, the club sold Trevor Francis to Nottingham Forest, making him the first British player transferred for a fee of £1 million; Francis had scored 133 goals in 329 appearances over his nine years at Birmingham. Jim Smith took Birmingham back to the top tier, but a poor start to the 1981–82 season saw him replaced by Ron Saunders of league champions Aston Villa. The team still lacked goals, and were relegated in 1984. The last home game of the 1984–85 promotion season was marred by rioting and the death of a boy when a wall collapsed; the events formed part of the remit of the Popplewell inquiry into safety at sports grounds. Saunders quit after FA Cup defeat to non-League team Altrincham, staff were laid off, the training ground was sold, and by 1989 Birmingham were in the Third Division for the first time in their history.

In April 1989 the Kumar brothers, owners of a clothing chain, bought 84% of the club. A rapid turnover of managers, the absence of promised investment, and a threatened mass refusal of players to renew contracts was relieved only by a victorious trip to Wembley in the Associate Members Cup. Terry Cooper delivered promotion, but a bank collapse put the Kumars' businesses into receivership. David Sullivan bought the club out of administration for £700,000 and installed the 23-year-old Karren Brady as managing director. They avoided relegation in 1992–93, but went down to the third tier in 1994. Barry Fry's first full season brought promotion as champions and victory in the Football League Trophy, beating Carlisle United via Paul Tait's golden goal.

The new owners had converted the stadium to all-seater, were to float the club as a plc, and saw Trevor Francis as the manager to take it forward. Francis introduced players with top-level experience, such as Manchester United captain Steve Bruce. They reached the 2001 League Cup final, losing on penalties to Liverpool, and three successive play-off semi-finals, losing all three, and lack of progress made Francis's position untenable. Bruce took the team from mid-table in November 2001 to the play-off final in which they beat Norwich City on penalties to win promotion to the Premier League. Motivated by World Cup-winner Christophe Dugarry, Birmingham's first top-flight season for 16 years finished in mid-table. Three years later, they were relegated in a season whose lowlight was a 7–0 FA Cup defeat at home to Liverpool. Bruce retained the confidence of the board and delivered automatic promotion in 2006–07.

In 2007, Carson Yeung invested in the club with a view to taking full control in the future. Uncertain as to his future under possible new owners, Bruce left in mid-season. His successor, Scotland national team manager Alex McLeish, was unable to stave off relegation, but achieved promotion back to the Premier League at the first attempt, and a ninth-place finish, their best for 51 years, the following season. Yeung completed a takeover, and the team won a second League Cup, defeating favourites Arsenal 2–1 with goals from Nikola Žigić and Obafemi Martins, but league form collapsed, they were relegated, and McLeish resigned. With the club in financial turmoil after Yeung's arrest on charges of money laundering, Chris Hughton's team narrowly failed to reach the knockout rounds of the Europa League and the playoff final before he too quit. Under Lee Clark, Birmingham twice retained their divisional status, albeit needing Paul Caddis's 93rd-minute goal in the last match of 2013–14 to avoid relegation on goal difference. Continued poor form saw Clark replaced by former Birmingham player Gary Rowett.

== 1965–79 ==
Needing additional sources of finance to fund Birmingham's bid for immediate promotion back to the Football League First Division, the board approached Clifford Coombs, founder of home credit company S&U, for a loan. He agreed to put money into the club, but only if he could run it himself. He duly bought out the Morris family, promised to "find all the money I can afford. My heart is in Birmingham City and now my pocket will be as well", became chairman in January 1966, and lured Stan Cullis, manager of Wolverhampton Wanderers in their glory days, out of retirement. Cullis's team played attractive football, and average attendance doubled between 1965–66 and 1967–68. Cullis led Birmingham to the semi-final of the League Cup in 1967, and in the 1967–68 FA Cup, they beat Arsenal and Chelsea in front of crowds in excess of 50,000 at St Andrew's before losing to West Bromwich Albion in the semi-final. Cup success was not restricted to the first team: the youth team reached the final of the FA Youth Cup in 1967, losing to what was described as an experienced Sunderland team. Fourth place in the division in 1967–68 and seventh in 1968–69 preceded a slump towards the bottom of the table, and Coombs decided it was time for a change. He persuaded Cullis back into retirement in March 1970, and approached top-class managers, including Brian Clough and Peter Taylor and Don Revie, without success, before appointing Freddie Goodwin of Brighton & Hove Albion manager.

He strengthened the spine of the team, bought in Carlisle United forward Bob Hatton, a club record signing at £82,500, to play up front alongside the home-grown Bob Latchford and introduced the 16-year-old Trevor Francis to first-team football. In 1971–72, Birmingham were not in the promotion places at any time during the season until after the last match, a win away at Orient that took them to the First Division as runners-up, overtaking Millwall, who had been in the top two for most of the campaign and whose supporters attended the match in large numbers to encourage Orient.

Goodwin had converted the attractive but inconsistent football of Cullis's teams to a skilful, aggressive game capable of drawing crowds – average home league attendance rose to over 32,000 – and maintaining top-flight status. Yet five years later, the Birmingham Mail sports editor, Dennis Shaw, wrote what a colleague described as a "a dossier of despair on the wasted seventies at St Andrew's. It was a chronicle of lack of achievement, sales of star players and unsuccessful replacements, growing disenchantment among the fans." Seven wins and a draw in the last eight matches took Birmingham to a mid-table finish in 1972–73, but by February 1974, the team lay 20th, the club needed to raise money, and Latchford was sold to Everton in a part-exchange deal: £80,000 cash plus players Howard Kendall and Archie Styles, valued at a British record fee of £350,000. Without a goalscorer of that quality, the team struggled, but they avoided relegation, and stayed up again in 1974–75, as well as reaching another FA Cup semi-final. This time they lost to Second Division Fulham in a replay when, in the last seconds of extra time, a goalkeeping clearance rebounded off a Fulham player and trickled over the line.

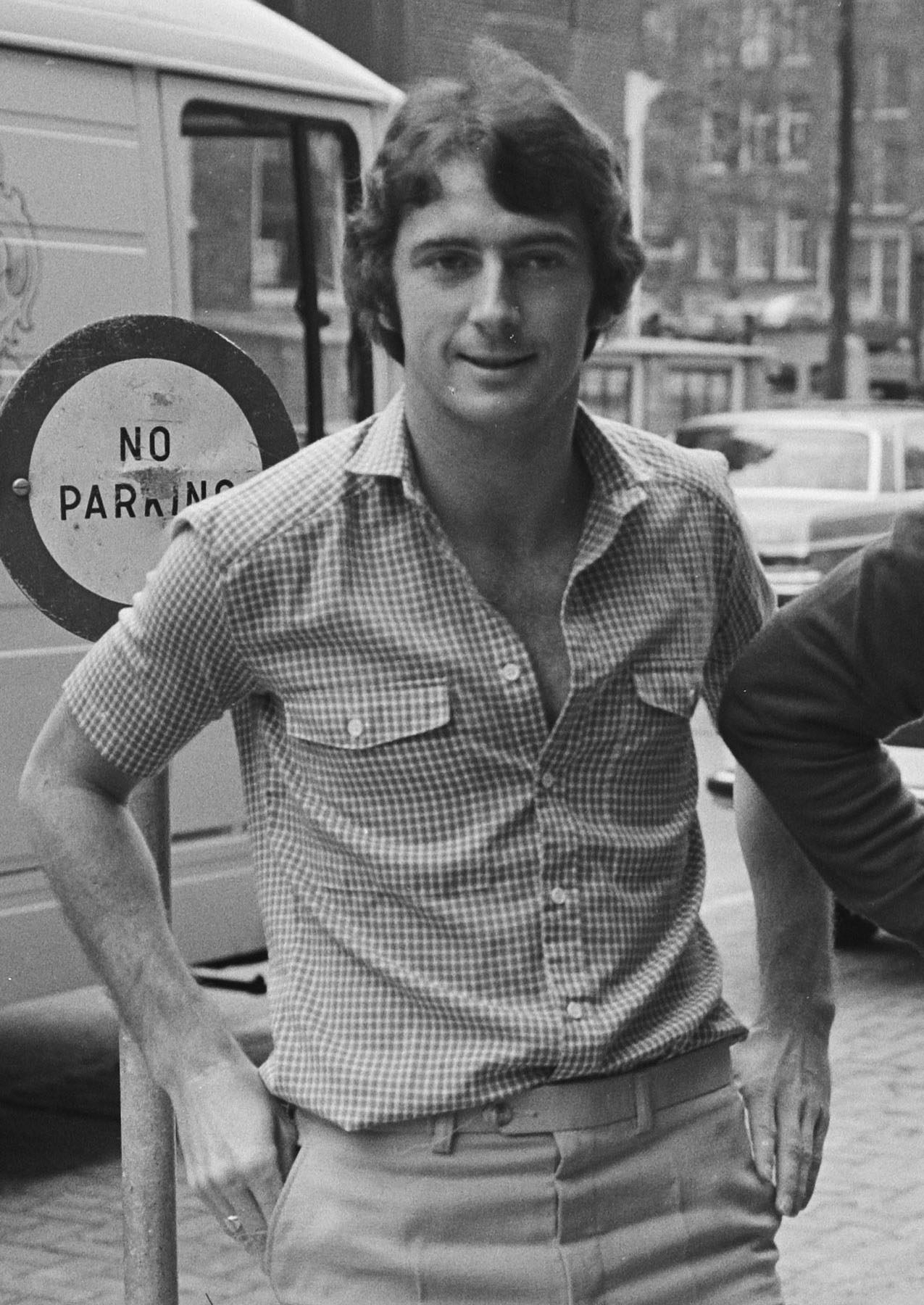
Trevor Francis, pictured the year after he left Birmingham

In September 1975, Keith Coombs, who had recently succeeded his father as chairman, sacked Goodwin and appointed his long-time first-team coach Willie Bell as manager. Financial reasons forced the sale of players such as Peter Withe and Kenny Burns – both helped Nottingham Forest win the league title in 1977, and Burns was voted Footballer of the Year for 1977–78 – although Francis's written transfer request was rejected. The team struggled, and after two years in post, Bell was replaced by England's World Cup-winning manager Sir Alf Ramsey, who had been on the board at Birmingham since January 1976, and who agreed to take over so long as the job title was not manager but consultant. After six months, during which time the team remained near the foot of the table, star player Francis made increasingly public his desire to leave a club he saw as lacking ambition, and captain Terry Hibbitt spoke of what the Guardian's Patrick Barclay dubbed a "crisis of morale", Ramsey recommended that both Francis and defender Joe Gallagher be sold. After the board backtracked on Francis, Ramsey left the club. (Note: Ramsey's biographer has him "locked in an increasingly bitter three-way dispute with his star player, Trevor Francis, and the board". After initially accepting the player's transfer request, the board changed their minds, fearful they would "incur the wrath of already disgruntled fans". Ramsey duly handed in his notice. The Times reported that "Sir Alf said he told the board two weeks ago that he intended to quit and sever his links with the club. ... He said at a board meeting on February 20 he recommended both Francis and the defender, Joe Gallagher, should be transfer listed. The board agreed but three days later changed their minds about Francis. Sir Alf said he then decided to opt out because of the board's policy.") Meanwhile, an action group known as the "Blue Revolution" had formed in an attempt to channel the increasing off-field discontent towards forcing change in the boardroom. Its public meetings were well attended, it organised a walkout of supporters from a match against Arsenal, and it publicly offered £250,000 to buy out the Coombs' holding in the club.

The appointment of Jim Smith, who as Blackburn Rovers manager had earned a reputation for playing attacking football, and the team's subsequent top-half finish went some way towards deflecting the criticism. Coombs also brought in Dennis Shaw as commercial manager, with the additional brief of improving the club's relations with press and public. Smith created a stir by signing Argentina's World Cup-winning full-back Alberto Tarantini. With relegation a certainty – the first league win came nearly three months into the season – Coombs finally accepted that the only way to clear the club's £500,000 overdraft was to sell Francis, who had scored 133 goals in 329 appearances over his nine years at Birmingham. He joined Nottingham Forest, becoming the first British footballer to be transferred for a fee in excess of £1 million; within weeks, he scored the winning goal in the European Cup Final.

== 1979–93: Decline and fall ==
Smith invested the proceeds of the Francis sale in new signings and took Birmingham straight back to the First Division in 1980. After just two seasons back among the elite, Birmingham were battling against relegation and Smith was dismissed in a February 1982, to be replaced by Ron Saunders who had just resigned from league champions Aston Villa. The appointment did not go down well on either side of the city, and the comedian Jasper Carrott resigned from the board in protest. Saunders assembled a team full of "hard men" which struggled to score goals; in two years, average attendance had dropped by nearly 20%, to just over 14,000, and they were relegated again in 1984.

They achieved an instant return to the top flight, but promotion came at a cost. The last home game of the 1984–85 season, against Leeds United, was marred by rioting, and a 15-year-old boy attending his first match died when a wall collapsed on him. This was on the same day as an even greater football tragedy - the Bradford fire - and the events at St Andrew's formed part of the remit of the Popplewell inquiry into safety at sports grounds.

The club was in trouble financially; the Coombs family sold out to scrap metal dealer and former Walsall F.C. chairman Ken Wheldon, who publicly contemplated leaving St Andrew's in light of the £2.25 million debts. In January 1986, with Birmingham battling against a third relegation in eight seasons, and defeat to non league, Altrincham in the FA Cup, Saunders quit, claiming the club was "committing total suicide". Staff cuts followed both on and off the field and the training ground was sold. By 1989, the average attendance had fallen to just over 6,000 and Birmingham were relegated to the Third Division for the first time in their history.

In 1989, Wheldon sold the club to Kumar Brothers, a Manchester-based clothing chain, whose owners claimed they would invest in the team. Dave Mackay replaced Garry Pendrey as manager. His first season was one of getting used to lower-division football, the second brought the prospect of further relegation, terrace protests, and the resignation of Mackay and his staff. Lou Macari led the team on a successful trip to Wembley in the Associate Members Cup, then walked out to join Stoke City. An action group was formed to try to remove the chairman, and many of the playing staff were out of contract and reluctant to renew.

Mackay's successor, Terry Cooper, delivered promotion via a combination of a professional approach and sound signings, some of which were paid for with money raised by supporters. Off the field, Cooper and Kumar were at odds: the team needed the promised investment but the club was heavily in debt and losing money. The collapse of the Bank of Credit and Commerce International (BCCI) put the Kumars' businesses into receivership; in November 1992 BCCI's liquidator put up for sale their 84% holding in the football club. Although several groups expressed interest, the club remained in administration for five months.

== 1993–2002: Reconstruction ==
On 6 March 1993, Sport Newspapers' proprietor David Sullivan bought the Kumars' 84% for £700,000. He installed the 23-year-old Karren Brady as managing director, allowed Cooper money for signings, and later that year sold some of his holding to David and Ralph Gold, owners of the Ann Summers chain. On the last day of the season, the team avoided relegation back to the third tier. A poor start to the 1993–94 season saw Cooper's resignation, to be replaced by Barry Fry, at the cost of a Football League fine and compensation order after being found guilty of tapping up Fry and his Southend United backroom staff. The change of manager did not prevent a return to the third tier. At the end of the season, the Kop and Tilton Road sections of St Andrew's were demolished, to be re-opened in 1994–95 as all-seater stands. For a change, improved surroundings were reflected in success on the pitch, with promotion back to the second tier and victory in the Football League Trophy at Wembley. Birmingham beat Carlisle United with a golden goal scored by Paul Tait, the first time this method had been used to settle a senior final in England. Fry was sacked in 1996, as the directors did not see him as the right manager to take the club forward; in his place the club appointed former player Trevor Francis, who had just left a relatively successful spell managing Sheffield Wednesday.

Fry had used no fewer than 47 players in his last season; Francis set about introducing stability. To add experience to a youthful squad expected to challenge for promotion, he signed five Premier League players, including the club's first £1m purchase, Chelsea's Paul Furlong, and Manchester United captain Steve Bruce. The club established a permanent training ground, Wast Hills, in West Heath, south Birmingham, and the schools of excellence, which Brady had scrapped, were reinstated at Francis's insistence as the precursor of the club's youth academy. Off the field, Birmingham City plc, of which the football club was a wholly owned subsidiary, was floated on the Alternative Investment Market (AIM) in 1997 with an issue of 15 million new shares, raising £7.5m of new investment. and the third side of the ground, the Railway End, was modernised. David Gold succeeded Jack Wiseman as club chairman in August 1997.

After a mid-table finish in 1996–97, the team narrowly missed out on a play-off position. Three years of defeats in the play-off semifinals followed, to Watford on penalties, Barnsley on aggregate, then Preston North End, again on penalties. Birmingham reached the 2001 League Cup final against Liverpool, which was the first major final played at Cardiff's Millennium Stadium during the construction of the new Wembley Stadium. Robbie Fowler opened the scoring for Liverpool, and Darren Purse equalised in the last minute of normal time with a penalty. Referee David Elleray failed to award Birmingham another penalty during extra time when Andrew Johnson was fouled, and Liverpool won the match after a penalty shoot-out.

Francis's tenure was dogged by difficult relationships both with his senior players and with the directors. After the flotation, Sullivan felt the need to publicly deny rumours that Bruce was lined up as manager, and the rumours resurfaced after he was dropped from the team in November 1997. In March 1998, David Gold had to talk Francis into withdrawing his resignation after the inclusion of the players' lounge in a matchday corporate package, and abuse of his wife and son by people using that area, brought his poor relationship with Brady to a head. She said that if it came to a choice between the two of them, she would be the only winner. By October 2001, lack of progress had made his position untenable. After a 6–0 League Cup defeat to Manchester City, he left by mutual consent. A period of caretaker management followed while the battle to secure Steve Bruce's release from employers Crystal Palace reached the High Court. Bruce shook up a stale team, taking them from mid-table into the play-offs. This time they were successful, beating Norwich City on penalties in the final, again at Cardiff; the decisive penalty was scored by the 18-year-old Birmingham fan Darren Carter.

== 2002–present ==
Bruce strengthened the team significantly, adding Kenny Cunningham, Clinton Morrison, Senegal World Cup captain Aliou Cissé and the combative Robbie Savage. After starting the season well, they faded when the small squad was hit by injury and suspension. Further reinforcement in the January transfer window, buying Matthew Upson, Stephen Clemence and Jamie Clapham and signing the inspirational Christophe Dugarry on loan, resulted in a comfortable finish in 13th place, above local rivals Aston Villa whom they had beaten home and away.

The start of the 2003–04 campaign saw Birmingham never out of the top six. Loan signing Mikael Forssell's 17 League goals helped them to a top half finish, but performances and results tailed off badly towards the end of the season. First-team coach Mark Bowen was sacked and replaced by former Coventry City manager Eric Black. International class players were signed – Jesper Grønkjær, Emile Heskey, Mario Melchiot – but an injury to Forssell left them struggling for goals. Aided by transfer window loan signings Jermaine Pennant, Mehdi Nafti and Walter Pandiani, another mid-table finish ensued.

In 2004 a proposal was put forward to build a 55,000-capacity City of Birmingham Stadium on the site of the nearby Wheels Park banger racing and karting circuits, to be funded partly by the sale of St Andrew's. The initial plans, of a "sports village" comprising the stadium, other sports and leisure facilities, and a super casino, jointly financed by Birmingham City Council and the casino group Las Vegas Sands, fell through. For a time, club and council continued what proved a fruitless search for alternative sources of finance. Before the 2005–06 season, chairman David Gold said it was time to "start talking about being as good as anyone outside the top three or four" with "the best squad of players for 25 years". Forssell, Nafti, Pandiani and Pennant had signed permanently, Nicky Butt and Jiří Jarošík joined on loan, but the first seven home games produced just one point. Injuries, lack of form, and a lack of investment during the transfer window saw them facing the second half of the season with a strike-force of Heskey, an injury-prone Chris Sutton and the lively but inexperienced DJ Campbell. They suffered a 7–0 home defeat to Liverpool in the FA Cup quarter-final and by the last game of the season were already relegated.

Heskey and Pennant left for record fees, many more were released, though Bruce was not. The board concluded that "Steve is the right man to achieve this ambition" of immediate promotion. A new recruitment strategy was adopted, combining young "hungry" players – Cameron Jerome, Gary McSheffrey – with loan signings – the Arsenal trio Nicklas Bendtner, Fabrice Muamba and Sebastian Larsson – and free-transfer experience – Radhi Jaïdi, Bruno Ngotty. An up-and-down season had calls for the manager's head in October, topping the table and beating Newcastle United 5–1 on their own ground in January, no league games for a month due to freak postponements, culminating in automatic promotion.

In July 2007, Hong Kong businessman Carson Yeung became the biggest single shareholder in the club when he bought 29.9% of its shares, via the Hong Kong Stock Exchange (SEHK)-listed company Grandtop International Holdings Limited (GIH), with a view to taking full control. The protracted and eventually aborted takeover process destabilised the club, and Bruce, concerned for his prospects under possible new owners, left in mid-season to become manager of Premier League rivals Wigan Athletic. Alex McLeish stepped down as Scotland national team manager to succeed him, to the surprise of broadcaster Roddy Forsyth, who suggested Scotland's supporters would be "baffled by McLeish's choice of Birmingham, a club with a modest fanbase and an uncertain future." Birmingham finished 19th and were relegated. Antipathy towards the board provoked hostile chanting and a pitch invasion after the last match of the season. Afterwards, chairman David Gold "[made] it absolutely clear, the board would never walk away from their responsibilities as custodians of Birmingham City Football Club. If we were to leave or pushed out, then we would only do so be putting it into the hands or people who would be capable of taking it further than we have."

The team were promoted back to the Premier League at the first attempt, and GIH completed the takeover in October 2009 at a total cost of £81.5M, re-registered the club as a private company, and renamed the holding company Birmingham International Holdings (BIH). The team achieved a 12-game unbeaten run, a club record in the top division, on their way to a ninth-place finish, their best for 51 years, in 2009–10. The following season, they beat favourites Arsenal 2–1 in the League Cup final with goals from Nikola Žigić and Obafemi Martins to win their second major trophy. McLeish's "greatest achievement" was swiftly followed by "probably the worst moment of [his] career" as the team were relegated back to the Championship. Three weeks later, amid rumours of his being favourite for Aston Villa's managerial vacancy, he emailed his resignation to the club. It was not accepted. Birmingham threatened to report Villa to the football authorities for "tapping-up", and to take legal action to prevent his appointment at Villa unless compensation were paid. The League Managers Association supported McLeish's claims that lack of communication with the board and failure to consult over player transfers could constitute constructive dismissal. Nevertheless, Villa considered him a free agent, interviewed him and appointed him. In mid-July, by which time Chris Hughton had been appointed manager of Birmingham, Villa agreed to pay compensation reported at £3m. This coincided with trading in BIH shares being suspended after Yeung's arrest on charges of money laundering.

The League Cup win qualified Birmingham for the UEFA Europa League. In their first appearance in a major European competition for 50 years, they beat Portuguese club Nacional in the playoff round to reach the group stages. Wins against Maribor home and away, and a win at Club Brugge and a draw at home, gained Birmingham 10 points, but defeats to Braga allowed that club and Brugge to play out a draw which gave each 11 points and qualification for the knockout rounds. They reached the play-off semi-finals, but lost on aggregate to Blackpool. Marlon King and Chris Burke – both of whom were signed by McLeish before his resignation – reached double figures in both goals (18 and 14 respectively) and assists (12 and 19); Burke played in 61 of the 62 matches that season. Publication of financial results was repeatedly delayed, which led the Football League to impose a transfer embargo. Hughton left for Premier League club Norwich City at the end of the season, and offers were invited for the club.

The embargo was lifted in time for new manager Lee Clark to strengthen the team, albeit with free transfers and loan signings. A possible sale of the club to a Chinese consortium fell through in December, and ahead of the January 2013 transfer window, acting chairman Peter Pannu confirmed that the club was open to offers for any player, as sales were necessary to stave off the risk of administration. The only departure was England goalkeeper Jack Butland, who joined Stoke City for a fee considerably less than had been rejected the previous summer, but Birmingham were able to loan him back for the remainder of the season. A mid-table finish preceded a narrow escape from relegation to the third tier in 2014. Birmingham extended their winless run at home to a second-tier record of 18 games, and needed at least a point from the last match, away to Bolton Wanderers, and for other results to go in their favour. Two goals down after 76 minutes, a goal from Žigić and Paul Caddis's 93rd-minute headed equaliser combined with Doncaster losing was enough to avoid relegation on goal difference. Continued poor form, with only one home league win in more than a year, brought Clark's dismissal in October 2014. After a brief period of caretaker management, in which Birmingham equalled their club record home defeat by losing 8–0 to AFC Bournemouth, Burton Albion manager and former Birmingham player Gary Rowett took over with the team 23rd in the table, and led them to a tenth-place finish. On 17 February, the BIH board voluntarily appointed receivers from accountants Ernst & Young to take over management of the company. Their statement stressed that no winding-up petition had been issued and the company was not in liquidation, and the receivers assured the League that the club was not in an "insolvency event" of the type that could trigger a ten-point deduction.

== Bibliography ==
- Inglis, Simon (1988). League Football and the men who made it. London: CollinsWillow. ISBN 978-0-00-218242-3.
- Lewis, Peter, ed. (2000). Keeping right on since 1875. The Official History of Birmingham City Football Club. Lytham: Arrow. ISBN 1-900722-12-7.
- Matthews, Tony (1995). Birmingham City: A Complete Record. Derby: Breedon Books. ISBN 978-1-85983-010-9.
- Matthews, Tony (2010). Birmingham City: The Complete Record. Derby: Derby Books. ISBN 978-1-85983-853-2.
- Matthews, Tony (2000). The Encyclopedia of Birmingham City Football Club 1875–2000. Cradley Heath: Britespot. ISBN 978-0-9539288-0-4.
