= Gold brothers =

Gold brothers or Gold Brothers may refer to:

- Warren Gold (1938–2015) and brothers Harold and David, London-based retailers who founded the fashion chain Lord John, operating from 1963 to the mid-1980s
- David Gold (businessman) (1936–2023) and Ralph Gold, London-based former owners of Gold Group International and Gold Star Publications, and part-owners of Birmingham City F.C., among other business interests
- Gold Brothers (Scotland) Ltd, operated by brothers Galab, Malap, and Surinder Singh (and relatives Bulhar and Dildar Singh); an Edinburgh-based business that operates tourism- and Highland-dress-related shops
