= Gold Star Publications =

British magazine publisher

- Founded: 1972
- Founder: David Gold; Ralph Gold
- Country of origin: United Kingdom
- Official website: gsp.co.uk

Gold Star Publications was a British magazine publisher co-owned by David Gold with his brother Ralph. It included printing and distribution businesses, including pornographic magazines such as Whitehouse, Rustler and Raider.

The business was formed in 1972 when Gold and David Sullivan merged their publishing interests.

The Gold brothers sold their interests in November 2006. In 2007, the brothers also sold their share in Sport Newspapers.
