= History of Birmingham City F.C. =

The history of Birmingham City Football Club spans the period from 1875 to the present time. For detail on individual periods of the club's history, see one of the following articles:

- History of Birmingham City F.C. (1875–1965)
- History of Birmingham City F.C. (1965–present)
