= Back to the Floor =

Back to the Floor is a corporate reality show in which a senior manager of a company takes on a junior position for a week:

- Back to the Floor (Canadian TV series)
- Back to the Floor (British TV series)
