= City of Birmingham Stadium =

Proposed stadium in Birmingham, England

- Interactive map of City of Birmingham Stadium
- Location: Saltley, Birmingham, England
- Coordinates: 52°28′50″N 1°51′46″W
- Owner: Birmingham City Council
- Operator: Warwickshire County Cricket Club; Birmingham City F.C.
- Capacity: 55,000
- Surface: Grass

Construction
- Opened: TBA

Tenant
- Birmingham City F.C.

The City of Birmingham Stadium was a proposed multi-purpose stadium in the Saltley area of Birmingham, England, originally for Warwickshire County Cricket Club and Birmingham City F.C. to replace the current Edgbaston Cricket Ground and St Andrew's Stadium respectively.

The cricket club cancelled these plans however, and only the football club remained interested. The original proposal was the centrepiece of a larger scheme to create a £300 million sports village on a 60-acre (240,000 m^{2}) site.

The proposal was for a 55,000-seat arena was to be part-funded by Las Vegas Sands, but the hopes of securing a licence for a super casino on site were rejected and Birmingham City F.C. were then unable to proceed with the plans for the stadium.

== Setting ==
The proposed stadium and sports village was to be located on a site currently occupied by Birmingham Wheels in the 'Wheels Adventure Park' of the Saltley area of Birmingham. The site is bounded by several active railway lines, a canal and numerous major roads.

In relation to other areas, the site is near the St Andrews neighbourhood of Bordesley Green which is home to the St Andrew's Stadium. The stadium is to the southwest of the development. Small Heath is to the south whilst Nechells is located to the west and Aston to the north. It is 1.1 miles (1.8 km) from Birmingham New Street station in the city centre.

Phase 1 covers the Wheels Adventure Park and would have included the stadium within it. In terms of area, it was almost equal to that of Phase 2. Phase 1 would require the least amount of demolition as the land is largely untouched by development. The northern boundary of Phase 1 was determined by the Rugby-Birmingham-Stafford Line which serves the area via the nearby Adderley Park railway station. The western boundary was determined by another railway line and partially by a canal whilst the eastern boundary is determined by a road. Phase 2, to the south, is the separated from Phase 1 via the boundary of land owned by Birmingham Wheels. Within the phase would be a soccer dome, indoor arena, basketball courts, health and fitness centre, Olympic-sized swimming pool and an entertainment complex, which would be attached to the stadium.

Phase 2 was the most southerly phase of the development and is a predominantly industrial site. Occupied by many workshops and warehouses, it required some of the most demolition needed for the project. This part of the sports village would have been home to community football pitches, tennis courts, residences, a hotel and large retail space. The southern and eastern boundaries are determined via roads and the small western boundary, via a railway line.

Phase 3 was the smallest phase in terms of area and would have been used for the construction of residential properties and park land. The site is occupied by warehouses and workshops. It is separated through the centre via a road creating two thin strips of land which are bounded to the east by a canal.

The entire 60-acre (240,000 m^{2}) site is contaminated as a result of heavy industry in the past and many of the buildings are derelict. It is believed the cost of decontaminating the land would be at £1 million an acre.

== Design ==
The new stadium would have been a multi-purpose 55,000-seater stadium which can host cricket, football, rugby and concerts. It was proposed to include moving tiers of seating. It was planned for a supercasino to be built on site, however, after the council backed a separate bid at the National Exhibition Centre in Solihull for an English National Stadium in the West Midlands which consisted of an 85,000 seater stadium to replace the former Wembley Stadium. Amongst other sites campaigning for the National Stadium were Coventry. However, London remained the preferred location for the Wembley replacement. The bid for the sports village was pulled out by the council and it appeared dead.

The initial designs showed a stadium with an elliptical footprint and a sloping roof. This stadium was proposed to be built on green belt land known as the Meriden Gap, and not on the later chosen Wheels' Adventure Park. When the plans developed into more serious proposals, images of the new proposed stadium showed a stadium with a rectangular footprint and a large external framework. It was the only part of the sports village to have had a detailed design as the other buildings had not had full consideration.

The sports village would have included numerous facilities for sports as well as Birmingham's first Olympic size swimming pool, however there were plans for an Olympic size swimming pool to be built at a site in Aston University near the Eastside. As well as this, 9 acres (36,000 m^{2}) of the development could have formed a new community sports campus, on top of a 200-bed hotel, an outdoor theatre, approximately 2,500 new residential properties, a 170,000 square foot (15,793 m²) entertainment complex and large retail space. An estimated total of 6,000 jobs will be created.

== Planning history ==
=== Campaign for a new stadium ===
Plans for a new stadium were aired as early as 2001 and it gained support from many football managers. Sven-Göran Eriksson gave his support and the then-current chairman of Aston Villa Football Club, Doug Ellis, announced that 47 of England's 92 league club chairmen had written to him backing the stadium. However, Ellis' support was subject to the venue being built on a site further south and becoming England's new national stadium. It was eventually overlooked for this honour in favour of a re-built Wembley Stadium in London.

=== Plans develop ===
It was revealed in late 2004 where the sports village would be located, however, not what the proposal would look like. Immediately, David Gold, chairman of Birmingham City F.C., submitted his support for the stadium. In March 2005, Birmingham City Council had a meeting to seek authority for the City Council to enter into an exclusivity agreement. Those at the meeting decided to implement the plan. In May 2005, an image of the stadium was released however the full plans were not. The council again held a meeting to answer and questions and to ease any concerns people had over the proposed stadium. There was confusion over whether this plans were for a new Birmingham City Football Club stadium or for a stadium for the city in general. Plans for two separate stadiums were even considered; one at the NEC and another on the Birmingham Wheels site. The ambitious plans, designed by Populous, were unveiled in October 2005 after talks between the council and Las Vegas Sands.

In November 2005, a campaign for support for the stadium and super casino on site was launched. An opinion poll revealed that over 80% were in favour and supportive of the project in the area. This came two months after local councillors said they would object the plan on moral and religious grounds.

=== Stadium setback ===
However, on 20 March 2006 it was announced that the move would be unlikely to happen after Birmingham City Council announced plans to back the bid for a rival casino at the National Exhibition Centre, and not the one at the City of Birmingham Stadium. This was partly as a result of a petition handed to the council with 6,000 signatures from people in Saltley and Washwood Heath. This backfired and claims from local councillors in 2005 that 84% of residents were supportive of the proposals. However, it was revealed that the majority of the city were supportive of the proposals. Rumours of the Birmingham City board trying once again to get the backing of the council have been spreading in the press, however nothing has been confirmed at this time.

For twelve months, there was little news of the plans except for Birmingham City Football Club saying there were still in talks with the council over the prospect of the Sports Village and stadium.

=== The plans are reawakened ===
One year later, after a period of little news, it was revealed that the late regeneration councillor at Birmingham City Council, Councillor Ken Hardeman (Conservative councillor for Brandwood), was to campaign to investors at the MIPIM show at Cannes, France, as part of Team Birmingham in March 2007.

Following the MIPIM show, Ken Hardeman announced that the plans for the stadium were alive and that investors were interested in the stadium. However, there was no mention of the plans for a sports village raising uncertainty over whether they were no longer being assessed. Hardeman also revealed that the council were prepared to give 30 acres (120,000 m^{2}) of land they already own around the Birmingham Wheels site towards the project, creating an 80-acre (320,000 m^{2}) site.

== See also ==
- English National Stadium (West Midlands)
- List of English football stadiums by capacity
- List of cricket grounds in England and Wales
