= Vanessa Gold (businesswoman) =

English football club joint-chair and businesswoman (born 1967)

- Born: Vanessa Julia Gold; June 1967 (age 59)
- Occupation: Businesswoman
- Title: Chairwoman of West Ham United (2023–present)
- Spouse: Nick Young (m. 2002)
- Father: David Gold
- Relatives: Jacqueline Gold (sister)

Vanessa Julia Young (née Gold; born June 1967) is an English football club chairwoman and businesswoman. Gold was appointed to the board of West Ham United, as joint-chair, with David Sullivan in August 2023. In June 2026, Sullivan resigned from the board.

== West Ham United ==
Gold is the daughter of former West Ham co-owner, David Gold. On appointment as co-chair, Gold took on the shares in West Ham owned by her father giving her a 25.1% share in the club. In October 2023, Gold announced that she was considering selling some of her shares in the club and had appointed Rothschild & Co to advise on a sale. Following David Sullivan's resignation from the board on 6 June 2026, Gold became the sole company chair of the EFL football club.

== Ann Summers ==
In July 2023, Gold was appointed to the role of company chair of Ann Summers, a British multinational retailer company specialising in sex toys and lingerie, following the death of her sister and chief executive Jacqueline Gold earlier in 2023. She had previously been both joint managing director and chief executive having worked her way up in the company starting in her teens.
