= Birmingham Wheels Park =

Dedicated Wheeled-sports park

- Location: Adderley Road S, Bordesley Green Birmingham
- Coordinates: 52°28′51″N 1°51′46″W
- Opened: 1963

Birmingham Wheels Park (formerly Wheels Adventure Park) was a dedicated Wheeled-sports park with a short-track oval motor racing circuit, MSA approved kart circuit, drifting arenas, off-road rally stage and a purpose-built outdoor speed-skating arena. The site is in the Bordesley Green area of Birmingham, England. Formerly run by a Charitable Company Limited by Guarantee, and controlled by Birmingham City Council, it has now closed and been sold to Birmingham City Football Club. It is to be redeveloped into the site of their new 62000 capacity football stadium within a wider Birmingham Sports Quarter development.

== History ==
The park was initially operated by the West Midlands Probation Service.

When the Birmingham Brummies motorcycle speedway team were left without a home in late 1984, following the closure of the ole Perry Barr Stadium they sealed a deal to race at the Wheels Project for the 1985 season. Unfortunately due to various reasons the team only raced one more season at the venue in 1986, with the last home fixture was on 26 September 1986.

The Stockcar racing arena is a 330 metres (1,080 ft) oval, with spectator terracing surrounding two corners of the circuit along with the home stretch. Built with a cinder surface, after the Birmingham Brummies speedway team finished in 1986, the track was red with tarmac. Until 2019, racing events on the oval track was run by Incarace,

The future of the site was thrown into doubt when in 2006 plans were unveiled for the City of Birmingham Stadium. The large stadium/casino complex (which would also have been the new home for nearby Birmingham City F.C) would have been built on the Wheels complex, including the Birmingham Wheels Oval circuit. However, with the government shelving, and the introduction of 'super casinos', the future for Birmingham Wheels Park seemed secure.

Many Councillors and advocates for the park have worked hard to ensure the future of the Park, including Cllr Bob Beauchamp who has worked hard over many years to keep and grow the Park on behalf of residents and sports enthusiasts nationwide. The short circuit oval has been recognised as a participation sports venue and as such if the facility were to be removed from the people of Birmingham, it has been established that the local authority must provide an alternative venue of the same or better standard. The community of users regularly accessing the site feel strongly that this unique Park has manifest public benefit - and with there being so many derelict sites in the city, there has been an argument that sporting facilities such as Birmingham Wheels Park should be protected.

A government-appointed inspector in 2017 confirmed that the council must allow for the continuation of the sporting facilities of BWP to either be relocated or built within the regeneration plans, however, The labor council of Birmingham, obtained 15 million pounds, by stating the park was a former site, and then to level up the sporting facility to sell of the land for housing and warehousing developments, a sad end to 40 years of sporting activities within the heart of the UK. The stock car arena is one of six arenas onsite - each hosting different wheeled sports. The venue has seen national and international champions starting their skating or racing careers at the Park. In 2020, the stock car track survived an attempt at being closed by Birmingham City Council and the oval racing operations were taken over by Promotasport International (PRI).

Following the issuing of the new lease on the Park to Motor Racing Live in March 2020, the park closed again and awaits redevelopment plans. Several special events were held that assisted drivers from all over the UK who suffered from disability and mental health issues, which allowed for L2D to open during full lockdown during the covid-19 pandemic. This now has been taken away with the remaining community asset of the park, by the council since the closure in October 2021.

On 9 April 2024, Birmingham City announced their acquisition of Wheels Park, intending to transform it into a sports quarter, which would include a state-of-the-art stadium and training amenities for all Birmingham City teams (as the replacement to their stadium St Andrew's) and plans for expansive commercial and community spaces. The development of the Sports Quarter is anticipated to generate the creation of more than 3,000 employment opportunities within the local area. The club's chairman, Tom Wagner, declared that the stadium is expected to be completed by August 2029, with an estimated cost ranging from "2-3 billion pounds." The stadium is aiming to host future international events such as the Euros and NFL matches.

== Community projects ==
- Speed skating - a community-based project supported and funded by the licensees and tenants of the venue.
- Sensory garden.
- Community service - base for the team for the central Birmingham area.

== Motorsports ==
=== Drifting ===
The sport of drifting was first hosted at the venue in 2006 when Japanese professional drifters came to the UK and held events to promote the sport. In 2012, Drift Allstars saw Irish drifter Alan Sinnot take 1st place podium from Australian driver Luke Fink after his tire came off a mid-battle in front of a sell-out crowd. Luke would later return to the UK and help create and host at Birmingham Wheels Raceway, what was at the time, the largest prize money event within the sport.

The drifting academies on site have been in operation since 2008, Drift Allstars originally started, followed by Learn2drift Ltd in 2012, and in 2014 when drift Allstars went into liquidation, the charity owners of the park sold the cars they held for nonpayment of rent to Flatout factory, who later rebranded as Pro Drift Academy UK. When the park was reopened in July 2020, Learn2drift Ltd took overall control of the drift training on the site due to the size of their operations, allowing for a central base in the UK for their disabled driver training and intensive drift training.

In 2021, one of L2D's drivers became the second professional driver to earn his Pro2 British drift championships license at just the age of 13 years old. Mitchell Gibbons, now earning the right to become an instructor within the L2D team.

=== Karting ===
The 970 metres (3,180 ft) international Kart circuit is where Nigel Mansell started his career. and the Grand Prix Karting center has both junior and practice circuits and runs events on the main circuit.

=== Stock car racing ===
The short circuit oval hosts versions of Stock car racing every Saturday evening including rounds of BRISCA Formula 1 and Formula 2.

== Filming and television ==
The site has been the location of several filming shoots including;

- The Gadget Show
- A Question of Sport
- Brum
- BBC's Gassed up series (2022 episode 2)

== See also ==
- Hednesford Hills Raceway Incarace short circuit
