= Back to the Floor (British TV series) =

- Country of origin: United Kingdom
- Original language: English
- No. of series: 5
- No. of episodes: 36

Production
- Producer: BBC
- Running time: 30 minutes

Original release
- Network: BBC Two
- Release: 28 October 1997 – 19 April 2002

Related
- Undercover Boss

Back to the Floor is a reality television series broadcast on BBC Two in the late 1990s and early 2000s in which CEOs or top-level managers went undercover in their organisations and took a junior/entry-level job in their company. This gave them much to think about during the exercise and learn how their company really works, what the industry is like, and what their employees really think of them.

== Awards ==
It won "Best Feature" at the British Academy Television Awards 1999.

== Episodes ==
=== Series 1 (1997) ===
1. "Working Holiday" (broadcast 28 October 1997) – Terry Brown of Unijet spends a week as a rep in Tenerife.
2. "A Class Apart" (broadcast 4 November 1997) – Headmistress Gillian DuCharme teaches in a comprehensive.
3. "Running Water" (broadcast 11 November 1997) – Bob Baty of South West Water returns to the frontline.
4. "Drop in Rank" (broadcast 18 November 1997) – General Sir Hew Pike becomes a junior officer in the Army.
5. "Crawling About" (broadcast 25 November 1997) – Peter Cottee of Terminex works as a pest controller in London.
6. "Pillow Talk" (broadcast 2 December 1997) – Ann Lloyd becomes an auxiliary nurse.

=== Series 2 (1998) ===
1. "Seeing Red" (broadcast 10 November 1998) – Tony Marshall, MD of Butlins samples life as a redcoat.
2. "Back on Site" (broadcast 17 November 1998) – Tony Pidgley of Berkeley Group Holdings works as a site manager on his own multi-million pound development.
3. "Home Truths" (broadcast 24 November 1998) – Heather Rabatts, Chief Executive of Lambeth Council, becomes a housing trainee.
4. "Top Dog" (broadcast 1 December 1998) – Peter Davies, DG of the RSPCA, works as an inspector in Leeds.
5. "A Copper's Lot" (broadcast 8 December 1998) – Police chief Paul Whitehouse goes back on the beat.
6. "Man on the Move" (broadcast 15 December 1998) – Grant Whitaker becomes a mover for Pickfords.

=== Series 3 (1999) ===
1. "Supermarket Swap" (Broadcast 28 October 1999) – Sainsbury's Chief Executive Dino Adriano works as an Assistant Floor Manager.
2. "Down to Earth" (Broadcast 4 November 1999) – Roger Cato becomes a Customer Service Duty Manager at Heathrow airport.
3. "On the Rails" (Broadcast 11 November 1999) – Giles Fearnley, Chief Executive of West Anglia Great Northern works as a platform supervisor.
4. "Fast Food" (Broadcast 18 November 1999) – David Ford of Gardner Marchant trains as a catering Manager.
5. "The Write Stuff" (Broadcast 25 November 1999) – David Sullivan, publisher of the Daily Sport and Sunday Sport, hustles as a reporter.
6. "Child's Play" (Broadcast 2 December 1999) – The head of PGL looks after 24 children for a week.
7. "Breaking the Mould" (Broadcast 9 December 1999) – Wedgwood's Brian Patterson works on the production line.
8. "No Place Like Home" (Broadcast 16 December 1999) – David Batts cleans and washes for his own Radisson-Edwardian hotel chain.

=== Series 4 (2000) ===
1. "400 Weddings and a..." (Broadcast 1 November 2000) – Sandals boss, Steve Garley, spends a week as a wedding co-ordinator in the Caribbean.
2. "Behind Bars" (Broadcast 8 November 2000) – Prison Service Director General, Martin Narey, turns 'screw' at Parkhurst.
3. "Binman" (Broadcast 15 November 2000) – Tom Riall, MD of the country's biggest waste disposal company, Onyx, spends a week on the bins.
4. "Musseling In" (Broadcast 22 November 2000) – Belgo boss, Luke Johnson, dishes out the mussels and the frites.
5. "Working Girl" (Broadcast 29 November 2000) – Ann Summers head, Jacqueline Gold, stitches bras and demonstrates sex products.
6. "Changing Homes" (Broadcast 6 December 2000) – Head of Carillion, Britain's biggest building company, Sir Neville Simms spends a week knocking down walls.
7. "Into the Lion's Den" (Broadcast 13 December 2000) – Chairman of Millwall football club, Theo Paphitis, spends a week on the staff at The New Den.
8. "What's in Store" (Broadcast 20 December 2000) – House of Fraser group boss, John Coleman, becomes a sales assistant for a week.

=== Series 5 (2001–2002) ===
1. "Cruising" (Broadcast 30 October 2001) – American multimillionaire Bob Dickinson, president of Carnival Cruise Lines, goes back to work on one of his own liners.
2. "Burger King" (Broadcast 6 November 2001) – French businessman Eric Bonnot, head of the Burger King fast-food chain in the UK, swaps the boardroom for a week's work behind the counter at the Liverpool branch.
3. "Hovis" (Broadcast 13 November 2001) – Peter Baker, MD of British Bakeries, swaps the boardroom for a week of putting crosses on hot-cross buns, scooping up litres of garlic butter with his hands, and chanting business Mantras in his Newcastle upon Tyne bakery.
4. "Central Park" (Broadcast 20 November 2001) – Just ten days after the terrorist attacks on the World Trade Center, Dr. Regina Peruggi, president of the New York Central Park Conservancy, leaves her Fifth Avenue office to work as a gardener in Central Park, where duties include cleaning dog mess and cleaning up after drug addicts.
5. "Ambulance" (Broadcast 27 November 2001) – Adrian Lucas, Chief Executive of the Scottish Ambulance Service, returns to the streets of Glasgow as a member of the ambulance crew.
6. "Women's Prison USA" (Broadcast 4 December 2001) – John Ferguson, head of the world's largest private prison firm, heads for New Mexico as he works for a week a guard at one of his organisation's own women's prisons.
7. "Dating Agency" (Broadcast 18 December 2001) – As head of the UK's largest dating agency, Louise Hansen's job is to make profits from lonely hearts.
8. "Hoover" (Broadcast 19 April 2002) – Despite making the world's most famous vacuum cleaners, the Hoover factory near Glasgow is fighting for its future.
