= Michael Caborn-Waterfield =

British businessman and entrepreneur

Michael 'Dandy Kim' Caborn-Waterfield (1 January 1930 – 4 May 2016) was a British businessman and entrepreneur. He is best known for setting up the first Ann Summers sex shop in 1970.
