= St Andrew's (stadium) =

Football stadium in the Bordesley district of Birmingham

St Andrew's @ Knighthead Park
- Logo since 2024

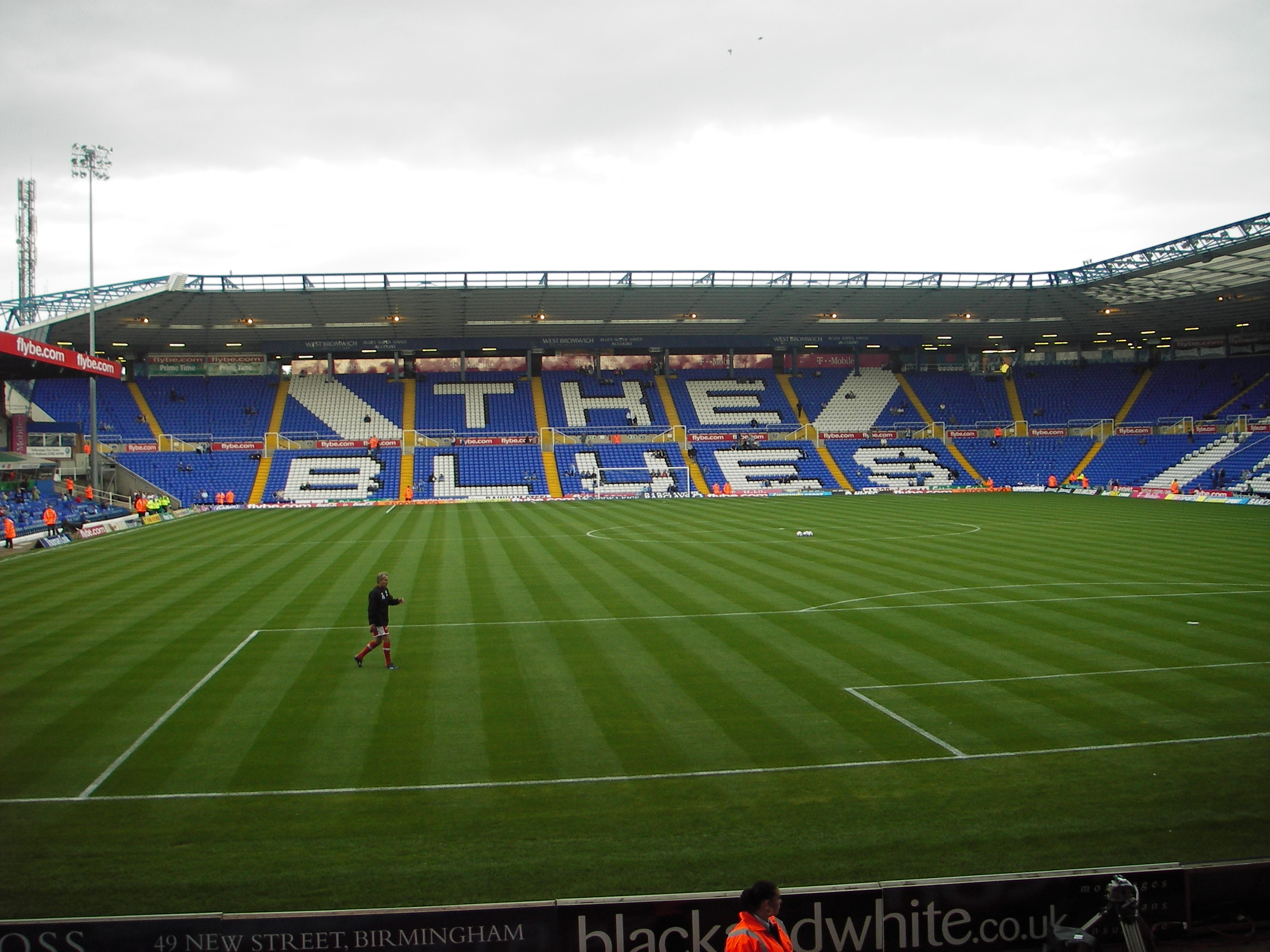
- The Tilton Road end, with the Kop to the right
- Interactive map of St Andrew's @ Knighthead Park
- Full name: St Andrew's @ Knighthead Park
- Former names: St. Andrew's Trillion Trophy Stadium (2018–2021)
- Location: Bordesley, Birmingham, England
- Coordinates: 52°28′33″N 1°52′05″W
- Owner: Shelby Companies
- Capacity: 28,754
- Surface: SISGrass hybrid
- Field size: 100 by 66 metres (109 yd × 72 yd)
- Public transit: Bordesley; 17, 60 and 97 bus routes

Construction
- Groundbreaking: 1906
- Opened: 26 December 1906
- Renovated: 1993–1999, 2020–2023

Tenants
- Birmingham City F.C. (1906–present); Coventry City F.C. (2019–2021); Birmingham City W.F.C. (2021–present)

St Andrew's, known since 2024 for sponsorship reasons as St. Andrew's @ Knighthead Park, is an association football stadium in the Bordesley district of Birmingham, England. It has been the home ground of Birmingham City Football Club for more than a century. From 2018 to 2021, its sponsored name was St Andrew's Trillion Trophy Stadium.

Constructed and opened in 1906 to replace the Muntz Street ground, which had become too small to meet the club's needs, the original St Andrew's could hold an estimated 75,000 spectators, housed in one grandstand and a large uncovered terrace. Between 1906 and 1939 it was reported that a lot of construction work took place inside the ground and the official capacity was set at 68,000 at the start of the 1938-39 season. The attendance record, variously recorded as 66,844 or 67,341, (Note: Some sources give the record attendance as 66,844: these include the Records page of Birmingham City F.C.'s website and Rothmans Football Yearbook. Others, including the History page of Birmingham City F.C.'s website, Matthews' Encyclopedia, and The Times newspaper from the Monday following the match, say 67,341.) was set at a 1939 FA Cup tie against Everton. During the Second World War, St Andrew's suffered bomb damage and the grandstand, housing a temporary fire station, burned down in an accidental fire. In the 1950s, the club replaced the stand and installed floodlights, and later erected a second small stand and roofed over the open terraces, but there were few further changes.

The ground became dilapidated: a boy was killed when a wall collapsed during rioting in the 1980s. When new owners took the club out of administration in 1993, they began a six-year redevelopment programme during which the ground was converted to an all-seater stadium to comply with the Taylor Report into safety at sports grounds, and all areas apart from the Main Stand were completely rebuilt. The seating capacity of the modern stadium is 28,754. It has function rooms suitable for business or social events and a club store selling Birmingham City merchandise. A 2004 proposal that the club should sell the ground and move into a multi-purpose City of Birmingham Stadium came to nothing. In 2013, the ground was listed as an asset of community value under the Localism Act 2011.

St Andrew's has been the venue for England international football matches at all levels below the senior national team, and for semifinal matches in the FA Cup and finals of lesser competitions. It was also used as Coventry City's home ground for the 2019–20 and 2020–21 seasons. It has played host to events in other sports, including rugby union and professional boxing, and more recently has staged music concerts. It is the third largest sporting venue in the West Midlands - ahead of The Hawthorns, Alexander Stadium and Poundland Bescot Stadium but behind Villa Park and Molineux Stadium.

== History ==
=== Former grounds ===
Small Heath Alliance—the original name of Birmingham City Football Club—played their first home games on waste ground off Arthur Street, in the Bordesley Green district of Birmingham, very near the site where St Andrew's would be built. (Note: At the very bottom centre of the 1883 map linked here, Muntz Street leaves the Coventry Road heading north-east, crossed by Wright Street. Gessey's field is on the south-eastern side of Muntz St, adjacent to the north-eastern side of the short part of Wright St, and with open country to the other two sides. At the centre left of the map, above the words "Small Heath", and bounded by Coventry Road, Cattell Road, Kelynge Street (since renamed Tilton Road), Garrison Lane and the railway, is the site of the future St Andrew's stadium. Lower down, parallel to and very near the left edge of the map, is Arthur Street, where Small Heath Alliance first played their matches.) In 1876, they made a temporary move to a fenced-off field in Ladypool Road, Sparkbrook, with an estimated capacity of 3,000 spectators; because the field was enclosed, admission could be charged. Interest in the team grew, and a year later they moved again, this time to a rented field in Small Heath, situated on the eastern edge of Birmingham's built-up area, just north of the main road to Coventry. This ground, which became known as Muntz Street, had four sides of open terracing, a small covered wooden stand, and a changing-room for the players. When first opened it could hold approximately 10,000 spectators. Over the years the height of the terracing was raised, which increased the capacity to around 30,000, but this became insufficient to cope with the demand. The attendance at a match in 1905 against local rivals Aston Villa was officially recorded as 28,000 spectators, but several thousand more climbed walls or forced turnstiles to gain entry. The landlords refused to sell the freehold of the ground, nor would they permit major extensions to be made. As the board of directors estimated that staying at Muntz Street was costing the club £2,000 a year (£210,000 at today's prices), they began the search for an alternative site.

=== Construction ===
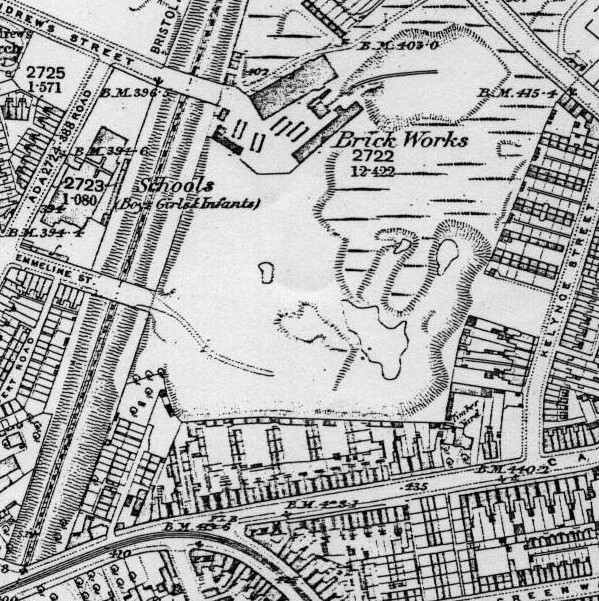
1890 map shows wet, sloping industrial site chosen for new ground.

Director Harry Morris identified a site for a new ground in Bordesley, some three-quarters of a mile (1 km) from Muntz Street towards the city centre. Covering an area of 7.5 acres (3 ha), bounded by Cattell Road, Coventry Road, Tilton Road, Garrison Lane and the railway, and near St Andrew's church, the site was where a brickworks had once operated. Though Morris described the land itself as "a wilderness of stagnant water and muddy slopes", the Sporting Mail considered it "very favourably situated for obtaining easy communication with the city and many of the suburbs, and will be served by an excellent service of electric cars [trams], while the provision of a railway station close at hand is also considered as within the bounds of possibility."

The club took the land on a 21-year lease, and entrusted the role of surveyor and engineer to a local carpenter, Harry Pumfrey, who despite a lack of qualifications produced plans "which would have done credit to the most expensive professional architect". Club director Thomas Turley, a builder, acted as clerk of works, and it is estimated the club saved more than £2,000 in professional fees by keeping the work in-house. Tradition has it that gypsies, evicted from the site before work could begin, laid a 100-year curse on the club; although gypsies are known to have camped nearby, there is no contemporary evidence for their eviction by the club, and construction began in February 1906.

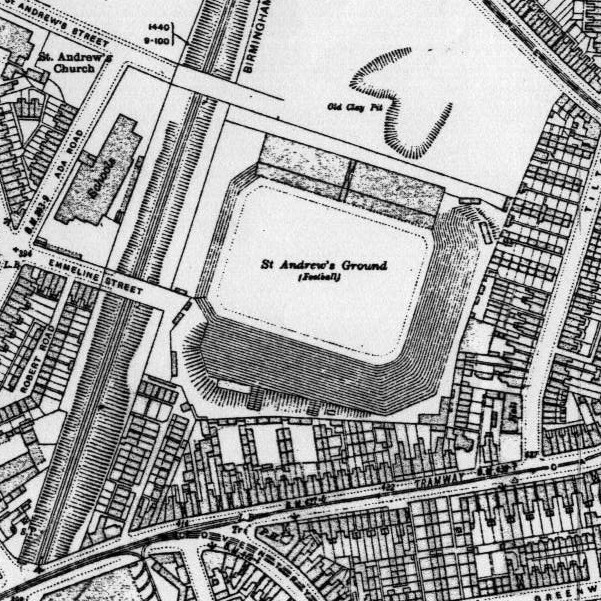
1913 map shows layout of completed St Andrew's Ground.

Artesian springs, which kept the land flooded, had to be drained and blocked off with tons of rubble before soil could be laid on top. To create height for the terracing on the Coventry Road side of the ground, the club offered the site as a tip: local people paid a total of £800 (£84,100 today)for dumping an estimated 100,000 loads of rubbish. This embankment was known from the beginning as the Spion Kop, stood 110 terraces high at its highest point, and had a reported capacity of 48,000 spectators, each paying 6d (£2.63 today). The Grandstand, on the Garrison Lane side of the ground, was 123 yards (112 m) in length. It held 6,000 seats divided among six sections, priced from 1s to 2s (£5.30 to £10.50 today), and all accesses were lit by electricity. In front of the stand was space for 5,000 to stand under cover. Beneath the stand were refreshment rooms, changing rooms, a training area with plunge bath, a billiard room donated by brewery magnate Sir John Holder, and the club's boardroom and offices, which hitherto had been maintained in premises in Birmingham city centre. Behind the goal at the railway end of the ground was space for a further 4,000 standing spectators, and access to the ground was gained via turnstiles on three sides of the ground. Total capacity was estimated at 75,000, and construction cost at £10,000 (£1,050,000 today). The playing surface, at 115 by 75 yards (105 m × 69 m), was one of the largest in the country, had a four-yard (3.7 m) grassed border, and was surrounded by a cinder running track.

=== Early years ===
St Andrew's was officially opened by Sir John Holder on 26 December 1906, when Birmingham played Middlesbrough in a First Division fixture. There had been heavy snowfall overnight, and dozens of volunteers, including members of the club's board, worked all morning to clear the pitch. The game finally kicked off an hour late, finishing goalless in front of 32,000 spectators. The Birmingham Daily Post editorial next day suggested that "the fact that so many spectators attended under such adverse conditions augurs well for the step that the directors have taken", and that the directors were "to be congratulated in having provided their supporters with a ground second to none in the country".

The Football Association chose St Andrew's to host the 1907 FA Cup semifinal between The Wednesday and Woolwich Arsenal; Wednesday won 3–1, and went on to win the tournament. This was the first FA Cup tie to be played at the ground, as Birmingham had lost their opening match away from home. Three more semifinals took place at St Andrew's before the Second World War, in 1911, 1924 and 1934. The club bought the freehold of the ground in 1921 for a price believed to be less than £7,000 (£736,000 today). In the 1930s, roofs were erected over the Kop and Railway End terraces, and in February 1939, the ground attendance record of 66,844 or 67,341, was set at the fifth-round FA Cup tie against Everton.

=== Wartime ===
During the First World War, the club supported the war effort by allowing the ground to be used as a rifle range for military training. On the outbreak of the Second World War, all outdoor sport was banned by the Government until safety implications could be assessed. When football resumed a few weeks later, Birmingham's Chief Constable ordered the ground's closure because of its proximity to air-raid targets such as the BSA munitions factories. The matter was first raised in Parliament in November 1939, but the Home Secretary felt unable to intervene. By March 1940, when St Andrew's had for some time been the only football ground in England still closed, the Chief Constable bowed to public pressure, and a crowd of 13,241 witnessed Birmingham's first home game in more than six months.

In 1941, St Andrew's suffered 20 direct hits from Luftwaffe bombing, which destroyed the roof of the Kop, badly damaged the Railway End, and forced the team to play elsewhere. It was therefore a surprising choice of venue for a wartime international match between England and Wales; on safety grounds, spectators were required to purchase tickets in advance, and numbers were limited to 25,000. Three months later, the Main Stand, which was being used as a temporary National Fire Service station, burned down, destroying the club's records and equipment – "not so much as a lead pencil was saved from the wreckage" – when a fireman mistook a bucket of petrol for water when intending to damp down a brazier. The team returned to the ground in 1943.

=== Improvements ===
The replacement Main Stand, built in the early 1950s, used a propped cantilever roof design, which meant fewer pillars to block spectators' view of the pitch. Floodlights were installed, and officially switched on for a friendly match against Borussia Dortmund in October 1956. By the early 1960s, a stand had been built at the Railway End to the same design as the Main Stand, a new roof erected over the Kop, and the Tilton Road end covered for the first time. A scoreboard and clock were installed at the City end of the ground in memory of Birmingham and England player Jeff Hall, who died of polio during the 1958–59 season. In the 1970s, the Asda chain proposed to share the cost of a new stand as part of a supermarket development on land behind the Kop made vacant by slum clearance; in the face of opposition from commercial rivals, the proposal fell through.

=== Modernisation ===
The last home game of the 1984–85 promotion season, against Leeds United, was marred by rioting, culminating in the death of a 15-year-old boy, Ian Hambridge, when a wall collapsed on him; a memorial plaque was eventually placed near the spot. The riot was on the same day as the Bradford City stadium fire, and the events at St Andrew's were included in the remit of the Popplewell inquiry into safety at sports grounds. In response to this and the later Taylor Report, the capacity of St Andrew's was cut to 26,000, but it was accepted that the stadium had to be brought up to modern standards. Club chairman David Gold recalled his first visit in March 1993:

It was a shock. I had a picture in my mind of what I was expecting, but it was in such a state of disrepair that it was hard to comprehend ... Only two-thirds of the bulbs on the floodlights were working and the Football League had threatened action if we didn't do something to improve the lights. It was raining. It was a dour game. It was dark. It was dull. There were people standing in the rain looking extremely uncomfortable and unhappy. This First Division club was penniless and near to extinction. There were corrugated-iron fences round the ground and it looked as though it hadn't seen a lick of paint since Birmingham reached the FA Cup Final in 1956.

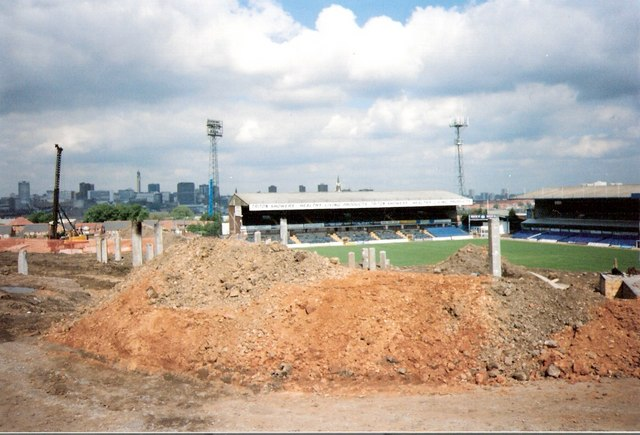
The Railway Stand and Main Stand (right) in May 1994, viewed across the site of the demolished Kop.

Though relegation to the Third Division meant the club was no longer bound by the Taylor Report's 1994 deadline for conversion to all-seater, new owner David Sullivan continued the £4.5 million development as planned. After the last home game of the 1993–94 season, the Kop and Tilton Road terraces were demolished, helped by fans who took home a significant proportion as souvenirs, the land was cleared – the rubbish tip beneath the Kop which had earned the club £800 in 1906 (£39,900 at 1994 prices) cost £250,000 to decontaminate – and by the start of the new season, 7,000 seats in the Tilton Road Stand were ready for use. On completion of the Kop Stand, the stadium was formally re-opened in November 1994 by Baroness Trumpington, representing the Department of National Heritage, who unveiled a commemorative plaque and presented a cheque for £2.5 million on behalf of the Football Trust; the ceremony was followed by a friendly match against Aston Villa, attended by a crowd of 20,000. Planning permission for an all-seater Railway Stand was granted in March 1995, but work was delayed by a dispute over land owned by Railtrack and the stand opened only in 1999.

=== The 21st century ===
In 2004 a proposal was put forward to build a "sports village" comprising a new 55,000 stadium for the club, to be known as the City of Birmingham Stadium, other sports and leisure facilities, and a super casino. The project would be jointly financed by Birmingham City Council, Birmingham City F.C. (via the proceeds of the sale of St Andrew's) and the casino group Las Vegas Sands. The feasibility of the plan depended on the government issuing a licence for a super casino as permitted under the Gambling Act 2005, and Birmingham being chosen as the venue, but this did not happen. The club have planning permission to redevelop the Main Stand, and a derelict building behind the stand has been demolished, but club and council continued for a time to seek alternative sources of funding for the City of Birmingham Stadium project.

In 2013, the Birmingham City Supporters' Trust's application for listing St Andrew's as an Asset of Community Value (ACV) under the Localism Act 2011 was approved by Birmingham City Council. The legislation defines an ACV as a building or other land whose main use "furthers the social wellbeing or social interests of the local community" and where it is realistic to believe it could do so in the future. It requires any proposed sale to be notified to the council, and provides for a six-month moratorium on that sale to allow the Trust and other community groups to submit their own bid.

For sponsorship reasons, the stadium was officially renamed the St. Andrew's Trillion Trophy Stadium in June 2018. During the 2018–19 season, in a further move to reduce the club's losses in light of breaches of the EFL's Profitability and Sustainability Regulations, the stadium was sold for £22.8 million to Birmingham City Stadium Ltd, a new company wholly owned by the football club's parent, Birmingham Sports Holdings, and would be leased back to the club for £1.25 million per year for 25 years.

Having failed to reach an agreement with the club's landlords, Wasps RFC, to continue playing at the Ricoh Arena, Coventry City F.C. played their matches at St Andrew's in 2019–20 and 2020–21.

An annual survey conducted during the 2020–21 season revealed the need for repairs to remedy the effects of water ingress on both Kop and Tilton Road Stands. Although the upper tiers were expected to be usable by the first home match of the 2021–22 season, resulting in a temporary reduction of total capacity to 19,000, the deadline for full completion was not until May 2022. However, the upper Tilton did not reopen until a month into the season, the upper Kop took a further six weeks, and May 2022 ended with the club still awaiting full results of site investigations. Work began during the 2022–23 season to demolish and rebuild the lower tiers, which had remained closed because of what was eventually revealed to be asbestos-related damage. Installation of rail seats to permit safe standing in the lower tier of the Tilton was due to complete in September 2023, and the Kop was expected to fully re-open two months later. Work stopped after main contractors Buckingham Group filed for administration in mid-August, and resumed in mid-September under the management of Mace Consult, with completion expected by the end of November. Both lower tiers were open for the last match of November, although the western end of the Kop was still incomplete.

In January 2024, the club's owners, Shelby Companies, renamed the stadium St. Andrew's @ Knighthead Park as part of what it described as "the largest commercial agreement in the club's history". According to Tom Wagner, chairman of both club and Shelby's parent company Knighthead, it was "step one in our plan to create a world-renowned 'Sports Quarter' in Birmingham. We invested in Blues because of the opportunity to not only transform a football club but to also be a catalyst for change in the city itself."

On 9 January 2026, during the intensification of Storm Goretti, the sky over Birmingham took on a vivid pink hue. This atmospheric phenomenon was caused by the stadium's powerful LED lights being used on the pitch reflecting off low cloud cover and falling snow. The visual effect, which was widely shared on social media and compared to a "cyberpunk" aesthetic, was most intense in the Bordesley Green and Small Heath areas surrounding the ground.

== Structure and facilities ==
The stadium has four stands. The Main Stand (renamed the Garrison Lane Stand from 2010 to 2012), a free-standing structure on the north side of the playing area, was completed in 1954 and has seating for fewer than 5,000 spectators. The upper tier contains the media area and an area of corporate seats as well as standard seating. The lower tier, known as the Paddocks, consists of a few rows of seats placed on the uncovered terraced area in front of the stand; the view from this area can be obstructed by the central tunnel and the dugouts. A row of executive boxes was added at the back of the Paddocks in the 1970s. The family area is divided between the eastern end of the Main Stand and the Paddock beneath. The club planned £1.3 million worth of restructuring and refurbishment work on the stand, which contained hospitality areas and offices, during the 2009 closed season, and seating was replaced in 2010. The broadcasting gantry is situated in the roof of this stand.

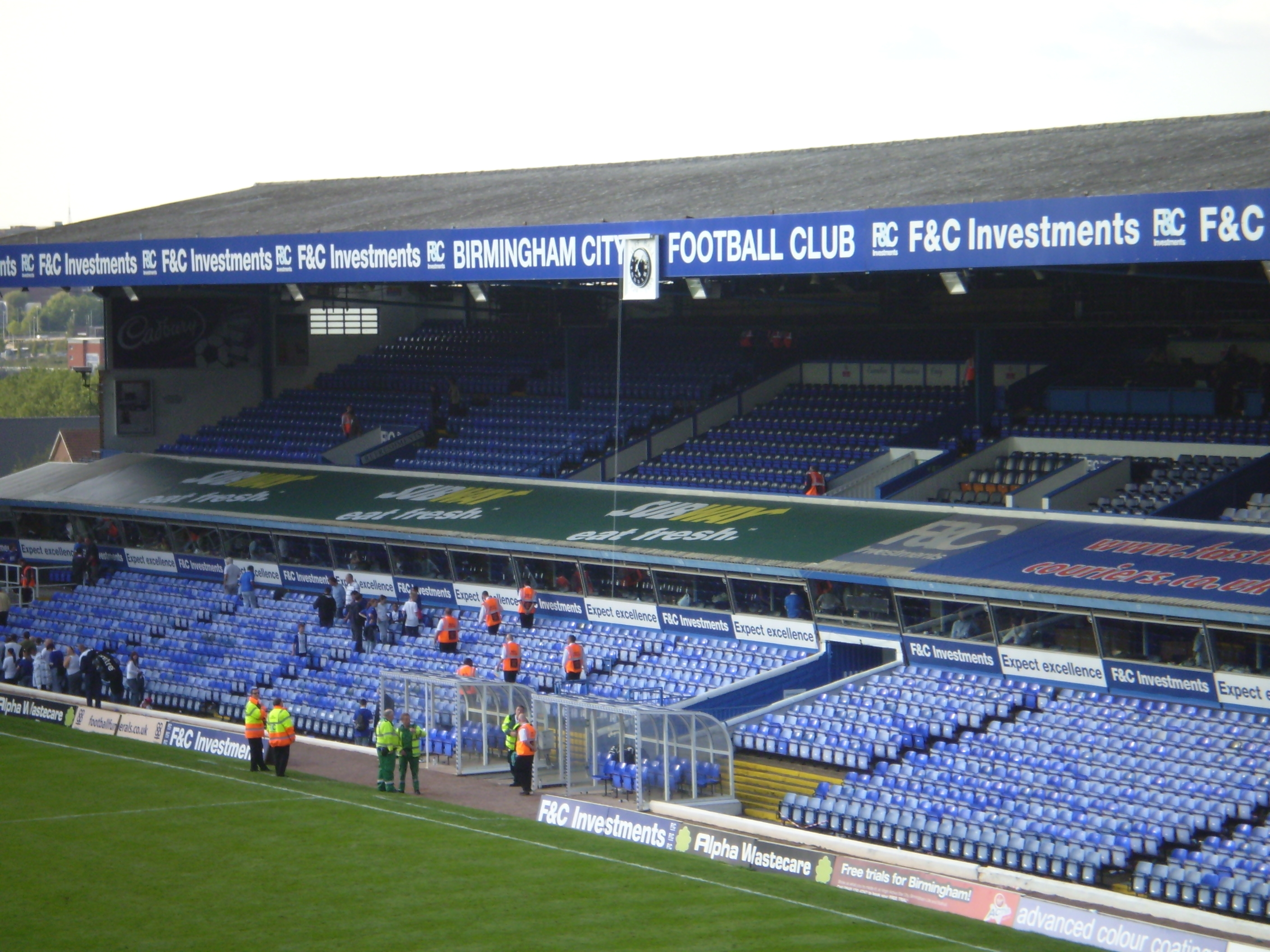
Main Stand showing Jeff Hall memorial clock, September 2008

To commemorate the 50th anniversary of Jeff Hall's death, the club commissioned a memorial clock to replace the original which did not survive the 1990s renovations. Placed centrally above the Main Stand, it was unveiled in September 2008 by Hall's teammates Alex Govan and Gil Merrick. However, adverse reaction to the clock's size and position provoked the club into ordering a larger replacement to be incorporated in a proposed big screen.

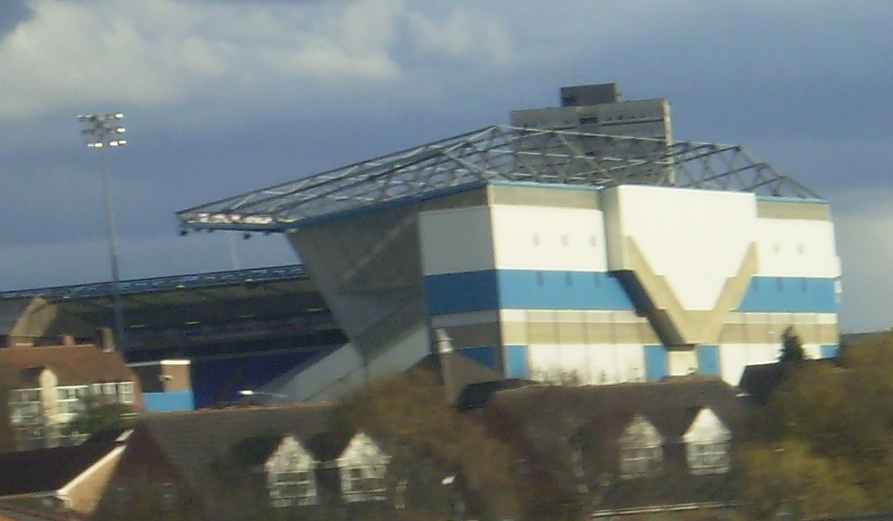
The all-seater Railway Stand was built in the 1990s.

The Railway Stand, on the west side of the stadium nearest to Birmingham city centre, is also free-standing. It was opened in 1999 and holds some 8,000 spectators in two tiers; the upper tier, a small area known as the Olympic Gallery, overhangs the lower, at the back of which is a row of executive boxes. From the 2009–10 season, the Railway Stand was renamed the Gil Merrick Stand, in honour of the club's appearance record-holder and former manager. Visiting supporters are housed in the lower Railway Stand, segregated from home fans by netting over the seats.

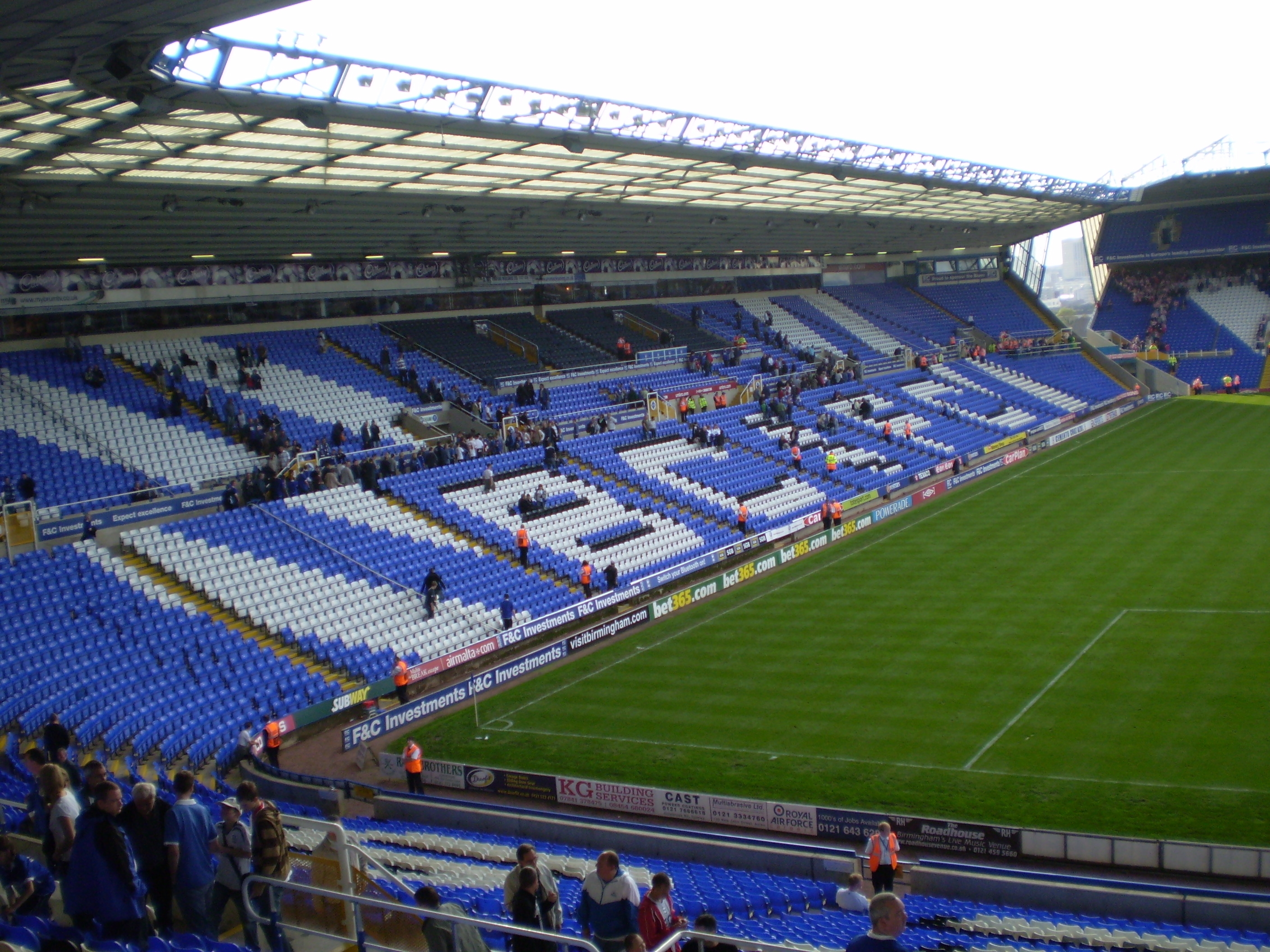
Kop Stand seen from the upper section of the Tilton Road Stand

The Kop Stand and the Tilton Road Stand, opened in 1994, form a continuous L-shaped single-tier stand, with seating capacity for nearly 17,000 spectators, round the remaining half of the pitch. A walkway separates back and front sections. The Kop seating includes the directors' box and a row of executive boxes, within the stand are a number of function rooms and hospitality areas, and there are electronic perimeter advertising boards in front. The stadium has floodlight pylons only on the north side; the south side is lit by a row of lights along the front of the Kop roof. The Tilton Road Stand has 9,000 seats, and is the only one without hospitality boxes.

The various function rooms and corporate boxes are available for hire for business or social events, and the stadium is licensed as a venue for civil weddings. There are accessible entrances, wheelchair areas and accessible toilets in all parts of the stadium, and commentary headsets for visually impaired spectators are available.

The pitch measures 100 by 66 metres (109 yd × 72 yd). It was relaid three times in 2007. The first attempt, made because the surface had deteriorated to a dangerous condition, was unsuccessful because of freak rainfall which resulted in the postponement of the next match – the first time such an event had happened in senior English football. The work had to be repeated, and then done for a third time in the closed season. The postponement of an FA Cup-tie in January 2009 highlighted the lack of under-soil heating, which was installed in June. In 2017 the surface was converted to use the SISGrass hybrid grass reinforced turf system.

== Other uses ==
Teams representing England have played international matches at St Andrew's, though not at senior level. In 1957, England B defeated Scotland B under floodlights in front of nearly 40,000 spectators. England's junior sides have played there on several occasions, at under-23, under-21 – the 4–0 defeat to Spain in 2001 was the England under-21 team's worst home defeat – and youth levels. Before competitive football resumed after the First World War, a Scottish Football League XI beat their English counterparts, including Birmingham players Frank Womack and Billy Morgan, 3–1 at St Andrew's.

As of 2009, four FA Cup semifinals have taken place at St Andrew's, and the ground has hosted semifinal replays on five occasions, most recently in 1961. It was the venue for the 1987 play-off final replay, in which Charlton Athletic beat Leeds United to remain in the Football League First Division, and for the final of the FA Vase in 2004 and 2006.

The ground has also been used for other sports. Small Heath Harriers athletic club, whose headquarters had been at the Muntz Street ground, trained at St Andrew's until the 1920s. The 1960 South African touring rugby union team beat a Midland Counties XV by 16 points to 5 on a muddy St Andrew's pitch in front of a 17,000 crowd. In 1949, Dick Turpin beat Albert Finch on points to retain his British and Empire middleweight boxing title; Turpin's brothers Jack and future world champion Randolph fought on the undercard. In 1965, Henry Cooper defeated Johnny Prescott at St Andrew's to retain his British and Empire heavyweight title; the fight took place two days after originally scheduled, having been rained off at the last minute, which prompted debate as to the feasibility of outdoor boxing promotions in light of the uncertain British weather.

St Andrew's was the location for the rally scene in Peter Watkins' 1967 film Privilege. It has hosted a number of music concerts: performers and events include UB40, supported by The Pogues, in 1989, Duran Duran in 2005, and the 2002 Party in the Park, featuring Westlife and Sugababes among others.

== Records ==
Average and peak league attendances at St Andrew's

The record attendance at St Andrew's was set at the fifth-round FA Cup tie against Everton on 11 February 1939; the actual figure is variously reported as 66,844 or 67,341. The highest attendance recorded for a league match is 60,250, against Aston Villa in the First Division on 23 November 1935. The highest average attendance over a league season, 38,821, was set during the 1948–49 First Division season, and the lowest, 6,289, was recorded in the Second Division in 1988–89. Since the stadium was converted to all-seater, the record attendance is 29,588, set against Arsenal in the Premier League on 22 November 2003.

St Andrew's was the venue for the first use of a penalty shootout to determine the winner of an FA Cup match. For five seasons, between 1970 and 1974, the losing FA Cup semifinalists were obliged to play off for third and fourth place; Birmingham City finished third in the 1971–72 FA Cup by beating Stoke City 4–3 on penalties following a goalless 90 minutes.

== Transport ==
The nearest railway station to the stadium is Bordesley, on the Birmingham to Stratford Line between Moor Street and Small Heath stations, which has regular services only on match days. The stadium is a 30-minute walk from New Street station, which is served by direct trains from most parts of the country, and slightly less far from Moor Street, which is served by Chiltern Railways trains from Marylebone. Birmingham Coach Station, served by National Express coaches, is a 20-minute walk away, and buses run from the city centre past the ground. There is no parking at the stadium itself.

== Sources ==
- Adams, Duncan (2007). A fan's guide to football grounds: England and Wales. Hersham: Ian Allan. ISBN 978-0-7110-3268-2.
- Inglis, Simon (1996) [1985]. Football Grounds of Britain (3rd ed.). London: CollinsWillow. ISBN 0-00-218426-5.
- Jawad, Hyder (2006). Keep Right On: The Official Centenary of St. Andrew's. Liverpool: Trinity Mirror Sport Media. ISBN 978-1-905266-16-6.
- Lewis, Peter, ed. (2000). Keeping right on since 1875. The Official History of Birmingham City Football Club. Lytham: Arrow. ISBN 1-900722-12-7.
- Matthews, Tony (1995). Birmingham City: A Complete Record. Derby: Breedon Books. ISBN 978-1-85983-010-9.
- Matthews, Tony (October 2000). The Encyclopedia of Birmingham City Football Club 1875–2000. Cradley Heath: Britespot. ISBN 978-0-9539288-0-4.
- Rippon, Anton (2005). Gas Masks for Goal Posts. Football in Britain during the Second World War. Stroud: Sutton. ISBN 0-7509-4030-1.
- Rollin, Jack (2005). Soccer at War 1939–45. London: Headline. ISBN 978-0-7553-1431-7.

== See also ==
- List of stadiums in the United Kingdom by capacity
- Lists of stadiums
