= English National Stadium (West Midlands) =

Unbuilt stadium proposal in Solihull, England

The English National Stadium (West Midlands) was a proposed multi-purpose stadium that would have been built on a site next to the National Exhibition Centre on the Meriden Gap in the Borough of Solihull in the English West Midlands region.

== Background ==
With the 2001 announcement that the original Wembley Stadium was to be demolished, bids were put forward for a new national stadium for England. The West Midlands bid became the main rival to the eventual winning bid to build a new stadium on the site of the old Wembley, for association and rugby league football and music concerts, and with a leisure complex.

== Proposal ==
The proposal was for an 85,000 capacity saddle shaped bowl stadium designed by stadia specialists ArupSport priced at around £324m. The stadium was to be jointly owned by a new company formed from the two councils - Birmingham and Solihull, the NEC group, and event owners such as the FA.

Advocates of the stadium highlighted numerous benefits:

- Location - The stadium would be in the centre of England and therefore more easily accessible to those living in the North than a stadium in London.
- Cost - The anticipated cost was lower than other bids, including the stadium in London.
- Transport Connections - As part of the wider NEC site the stadium would have had access to a dedicated rail station - Birmingham International railway station - an airport - Birmingham Airport - and excellent motorway links, to the South East via the M42 and the M40 the South West via the M5, and the North via the M6.
- Surrounding attractions - The area is already well served by hotels, and has a number of other attractions next to the proposed site, including the National Exhibition Centre, Resorts World Arena, and more recently a Casino, Cinema and Outlet Shopping Centre.

== Support ==
The proposal received support from a large cross section of people, including business personalities such as Karren Brady, high profile figures in football such as Doug Ellis, and more than two-thirds of fans surveyed by the Football Supporters' Association.

A cross party parliamentary motion for support of the stadium bid received over 100 signatures.

== Result ==
A decision was taken not to go ahead with the stadium, and to instead re-build Wembley Stadium in London. The decision was met with criticism, with accusations the government had bent the rules to allow the Wembley bid to win at the expense of the West Midlands bid.

== See also ==
- City of Birmingham Stadium
