= Bordesley Green Girls' School =

Coordinates: 52.4780°N 1.8574°W

Location
- Bordesley Green Road; Bordesley Green; Birmingham, West Midlands, B9 4TR; England

Information
- Type: Community school
- Local authority: Birmingham City Council
- Department for Education URN: 103493 Tables
- Ofsted: Reports
- Headteacher: Pritpal Hyare
- Gender: Girls
- Age: 11 to 18
- Enrolment: 1,013 as of April 2022
- Website: http://www.bordgrng.bham.sch.uk/

Bordesley Green Girls' School is a secondary school and sixth form located in the Bordesley Green area of Birmingham, in the West Midlands of England.

The school was previously "Arden Upper School" and before that it was "Bordesley Green Grammar Technical School for Boys" which had a long history having started as a Boys' Technical School in 1936. Much of the original building still exists, having a central quadrangle surrounded by three classroom corridors and one admin corridor. Separate Metalwork and Art workshops have been demolished.

Today, it is a community school administered by Birmingham City Council. Bordesley Green Girls' School offers GCSEs, BTECs and OCR Nationals as programmes of study for pupils, while girls in the sixth form have the option to study from a range of A-levels and further BTECs.
