= Break with the Boss =

- Created by: Twofour
- Starring: Liz Bonnin
- Country of origin: United Kingdom
- Original language: English
- No. of series: 1
- No. of episodes: 8 will be shown in total

Production
- Producer: Twofour
- Running time: 60 minutes

Original release
- Network: Living TV
- Release: 1 November – 20 December 2006

Break with the Boss is a British television programme that aired in the UK on Living TV from 1 November to 20 December 2006. An eight part series which sees different bosses each week take three of their employees away on holiday, during which they will have to complete challenges. The show was hosted by Liz Bonnin.

== Bosses during the series ==
The Boss, The company and the location:
Order	Boss	Company	Location of Holiday
01	Duncan Bannatyne	Bannatynes Gyms	Barbados
02	Ken Picton	Ken Picton Salon	Mallorca
03	Mark Simpkin	Simply Group	Tuscany
04	Martin King	Eminence Leisure	Portugal – Directed by Anna Keel
05	Mikey Murphy	John Brown & Co Estate Agents	Switzerland
06	Rachel Lowe	RTL Games	Prague – Directed by Anna Keel
07	Darryn Lyons	Big Pictures	New York
08	Jacqueline Gold	Ann Summers	Valencia
