= Saltley Academy =

Coordinates: 52.4840°N 1.8320°W

Location
- Belchers Lane; Bordesley Green; Birmingham, West Midlands, B9 5RX; England

Information
- School type: Academy Academy
- School district: West Midlands
- Local authority: Birmingham City Council
- Trust: Washwood Heath Multi-Academy Trust
- Department for Education URN: 141668 Tables
- Ofsted: Reports
- Chair of Governors: P Weir
- Headmaster: Paul Marano
- Secondary years taught: Year 7 - Year 11
- Gender: Mixed
- Age: 11 to 16
- Average class size: 30
- Language: Urdu and Spanish.
- Colours: Year Groups in order (7-11): Yellow, Orange, Blue, Red, Purple. The Academy's main colour: Dark navy blue.
- Website: http://www.saltley.academy/

Saltley Academy is a mixed secondary school located in the Bordesley Green area of Birmingham, in the West Midlands of England.

== History ==
Saltley Grammar School opened in the 1920s; by the 1960s it had upwards of 800 pupils. In the 1970s it was "converted" to a community school administered by Birmingham City Council. The school also gained specialist status as a Science College.

In 2014 Saltley School was placed in special measures by Ofsted after a critical inspection report. The inspection had been undertaken after Saltley School had been connected to the Operation Trojan Horse scandal which affected a number of schools in Birmingham in 2014.

Saltley School converted to academy status in March 2015 and was renamed Saltley Academy. The school is now part of the Washwood Heath Multi-Academy Trust which includes Brownmead Primary Academy and Washwood Heath Academy.

In February 2022 a teacher at Saltley Academy was found to have acted inappropriately with students from 2008 to 2015, leading to his removal and revoking of ability to teach at any school in England.

== Notable former pupils ==
=== Saltley Grammar School ===
- Neal Abberley, cricketer for Warwickshire
- Sir Richard Barratt CBE, Chief Constable from 1975 to 1978 of South Yorkshire Police
- Robert Kilroy-Silk, Labour MP from 1983 to 1986 for Knowsley North and from 1974 to 1983 for Ormskirk
- Maureen Jennings, novelist
- Carl Wayne, lead singer for The Move
- Prof Michael John Wise, Professor of Geography from 1958 to 1983 at the LSE
