= Jacqueline Gold =

British businesswoman (1960–2023)

Jacqueline Gold CBE
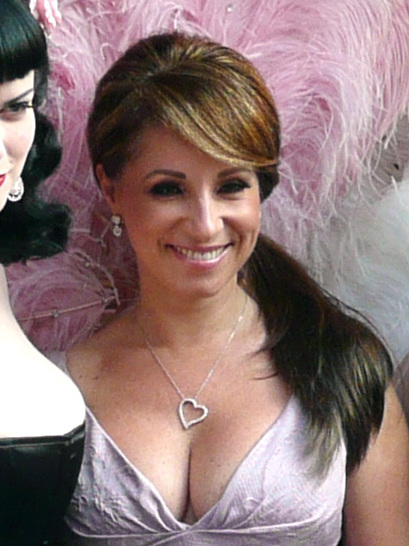
- Gold in 2008
- Born: 16 July 1960; Bromley, England
- Died: 16 March 2023 (aged 62)
- Occupation: Businesswoman
- Spouses: Tony D'Silva (m. 1980; div. 1990) Dan Cunningham (m. 2010)
- Children: 2
- Father: David Gold
- Relatives: Vanessa Gold (sister)
- Website: www.jacquelinegold.com

Jacqueline Gold CBE (16 July 1960 – 16 March 2023) was a British businesswoman who was the executive chair of Gold Group International, Ann Summers and Knickerbox.

Gold was estimated to be the 16th richest woman in Great Britain, worth £470 million in 2019 according to The Sunday Times Rich List.

== Early life ==
Gold was born on 16 July 1960, the daughter of Beryl Hunt and businessman David Gold. Her father ran a publishing business which introduced sex magazines to the British high street. David apparently wept when Jacqueline was born to his first wife, because he wanted a son. She and her sister, Vanessa, grew up in a spacious three-storey house with a large garden and a swimming pool at Biggin Hill, Kent. In August 2007, she was the main participant of the second episode of the BBC Radio 4 series, The House I Grew Up In, in which she described an unhappy childhood. Her parents separated when she was twelve years old. Gold was sexually abused by her step-father.

== Business career ==
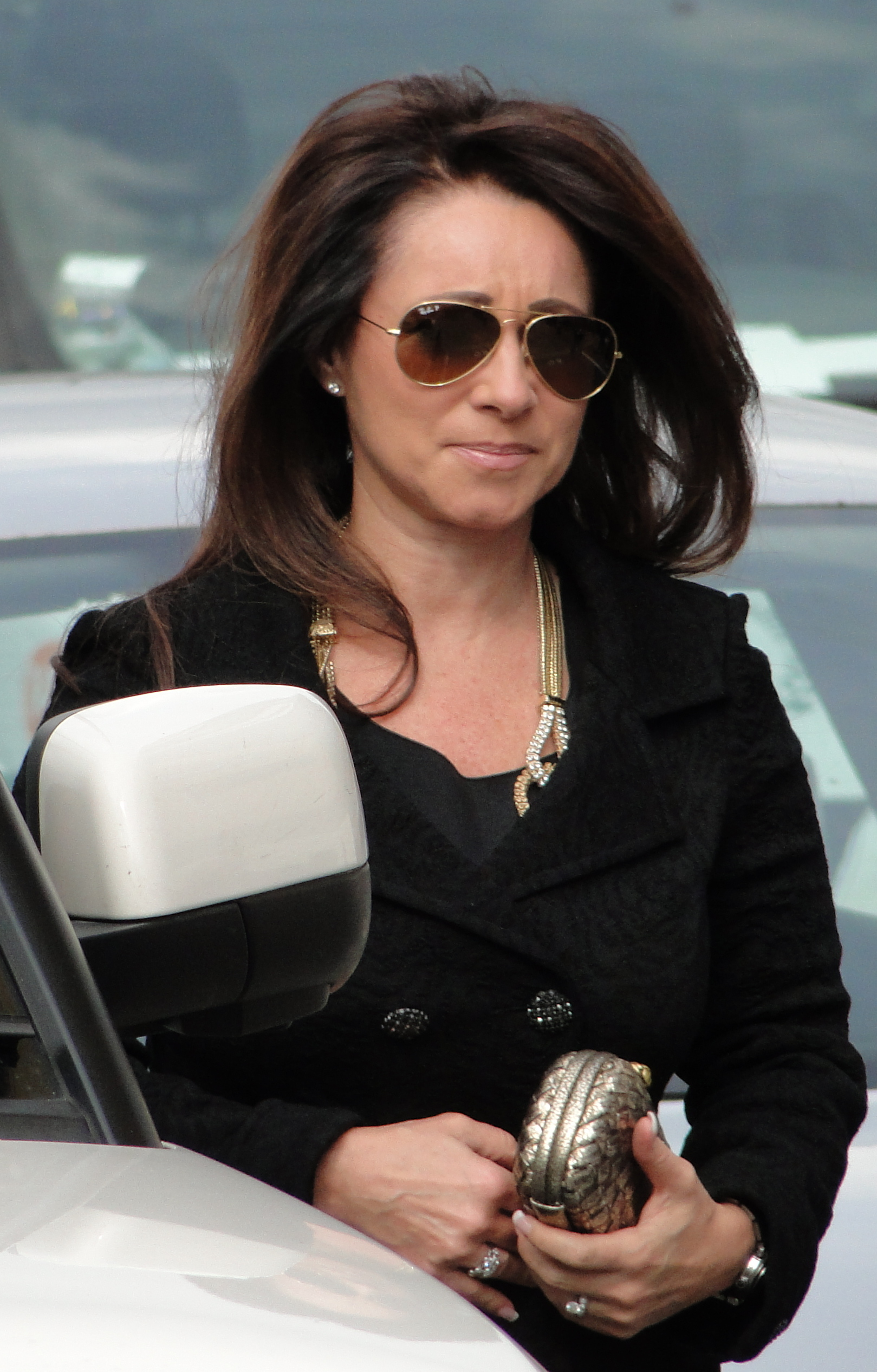
Gold arriving at Upton Park in 2011 to watch her football club, West Ham Utd

After school, Gold began working for Royal Doulton, but decided she did not want to go into management, and asked her father to help her gain some extra work experience. Having acquired the four stores of the Ann Summers chain in 1972, her father gave her summer work experience in May 1979.

Gold also did not like the atmosphere at Ann Summers, which was David Gold's "upmarket clean" sex shop. She said of her introduction: "It wasn't a very nice atmosphere to work in. It was all men, it was the sex industry as we all perceive it to be". However, following a chance invitation to a Tupperware party in 1981, she saw the potential of selling sexy lingerie and sex toys to women in the privacy of their own homes. She launched the Ann Summers Party Plan, a home marketing plan for sex toys, with a strict "no men allowed" policy. The format provided the company with a sales outlet which avoided legal restrictions on displaying sex toys for sale.

Gold was appointed CEO of Ann Summers in 1987, transforming it into a multi-million pound business, with a sales force comprising more than 7,500 women party organisers, 136 high street shops in the UK, Ireland and Channel Islands and generating an annual turnover of £117 million in 2008, although sales and profits have fallen in recent years. The reported sales for the period 2006/7 were down somewhat to £110 million. They have since fallen back to 2002/3 levels. The takeover of Knickerbox in 2000 added another five shops, with Knickerbox concessions in every Ann Summers store.

Her autobiography Good Vibrations was published in 1995. A second book A Woman's Courage was published in April 2007, and resulted in her being sued for libel by a former employee. A Woman's Courage was withdrawn from sale in November 2008 having been republished by Ebury on 7 February 2008 with three pages removed and re-titled Please Make It Stop. The High Court libel action was settled in August 2009 when the former employee was paid costs and substantial damages.

Gold was a columnist for Retail Week, New Business, Kent Business, and Women Mean Business.

=== Media ===
In March 2008, Gold appeared in a celebrity edition of The Apprentice. She was a member of "The Girls" team, alongside Kirstie Allsopp, Clare Balding, Louise Redknapp and Lisa Snowdon. "The Girls" won the contest raising over £400,000 from ticket sales and sales on the night through a big event at one of their West End stores.

Gold was the subject of several documentaries including Back to the Floor (which was filmed at a former business prior to its closure), Ann Summers Uncovered, So What Do You Do All Day, Break with the Boss, and co-presented the daytime business series Mind your own Business on BBC One. She has also appeared on the ITV1 show Fortune – Million Pound Giveaway, and in 2007, she was one of 12 well known individuals to serve on a jury in a fictional rape case in the BBC TV project The Verdict.

== Personal life and death ==
In 1980, Gold married lingerie manufacturer Tony D'Silva, which ended in divorce 10 years later. In 2002, she met Dan Cunningham, a City money broker, who was seventeen years her junior. Gold and Cunningham married in 2010. Her twin children, a son and daughter, were born in 2009. The son, Alfie, died at eight months old, to a rare brain condition.

In May 2007, Gold took part in the Walk the Walk charity MoonWalk in Hyde Park, London. In December 2010, a nanny working for Gold was charged with trying to poison her with screenwash. Allison Cox, who had been caring for Gold's daughter, was charged with three counts of administering poison with intent to annoy. In March 2011, Cox was sentenced to twelve months in prison after admitting administering poison with intent to annoy. Guildford Crown Court heard Cox was trying to get the chef who prepared the food into trouble by lacing two bowls of asparagus soup with screenwash on 5 October 2010.

Gold died on 16 March 2023, aged 62, after seven years of treatment for breast cancer. She died with her family by her side.

== Recognition ==
In 2007, Gold was voted the second Most Powerful Woman in Retail by Retail Week, the Most Inspirational Businesswoman in the UK in a survey by Barclays Bank and handbag.com, one of Britain's Most Powerful Women by many publications including Cosmopolitan, Good Housekeeping, and Woman magazines, Business Communicator of the Year 2004, and was included in Debrett's People of Today from 2005 for her contribution to British society.

Gold was appointed Commander of the Order of the British Empire in the 2016 New Year Honours for services to entrepreneurship, women in business and social enterprise.
