= Ann Summers =

British multinational retailer of sex toys and lingerie

Ann Summers Ltd
- Type: Private Ltd
- Industry: Retail
- Founded: 1970, London
- Founder: Michael Caborn-Waterfield
- Headquarters: Whyteleafe, Surrey, UK
- Number of locations: 80 high street stores
- Area served: United Kingdom; Ireland; Channel Islands
- Key people: Maria Hollins (CEO); Vanessa Gold (Chair)
- Products: Clothing; Sex toys
- Revenue: £109.96 million (2018)
- Website: www.annsummers.com

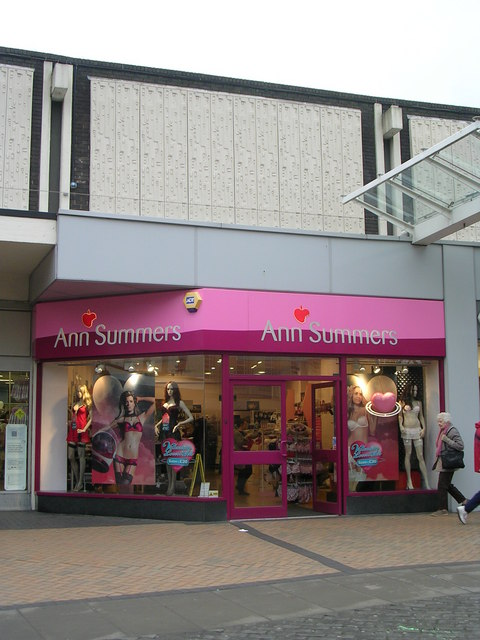
Ann Summers store in Huddersfield

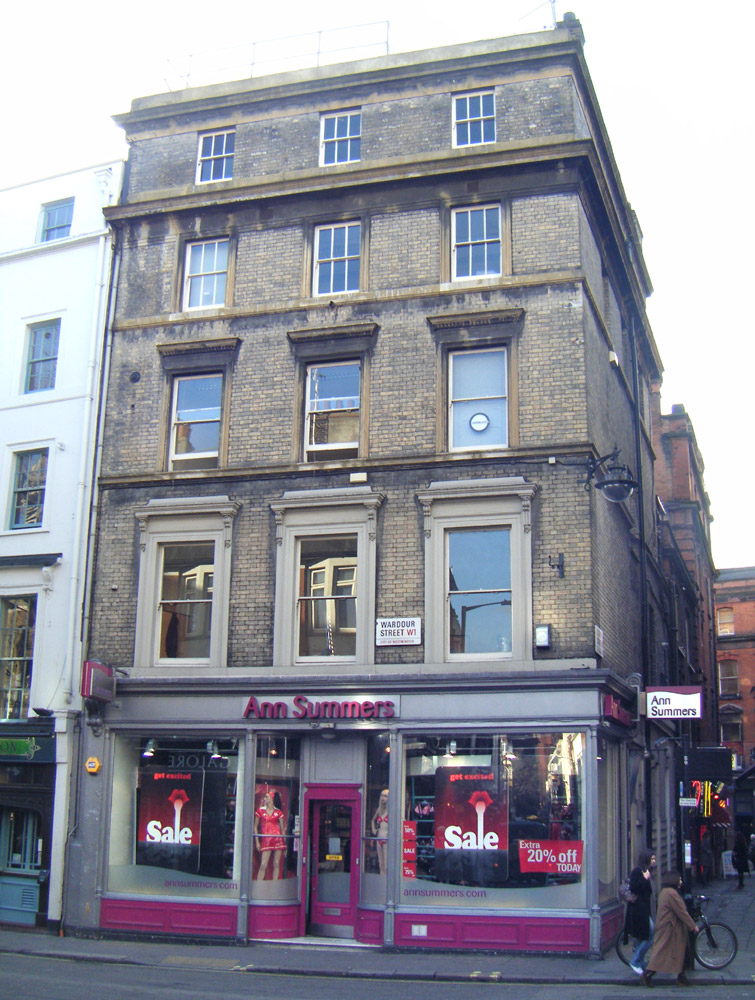
Ann Summers store in London

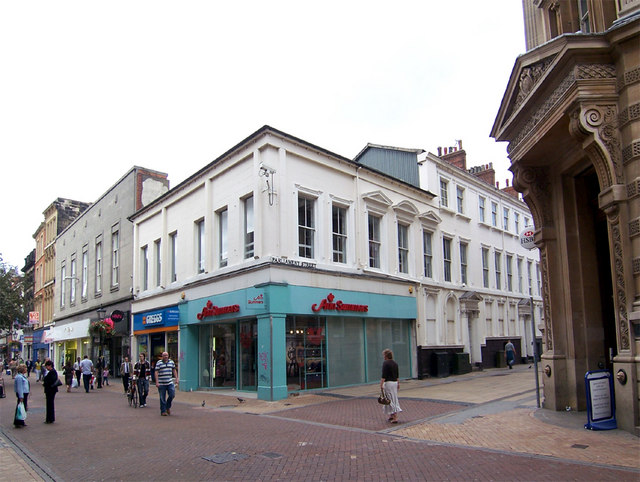
Ann Summers store in Hull

Ann Summers is a British multinational retailer company specialising in sex toys and lingerie, with 80 high street stores in the UK, Ireland, and the Channel Islands. In 2000, Ann Summers acquired the Knickerbox brand, a label with an emphasis on more comfortable and feminine underwear, while the Ann Summers-labelled products tend to be more erotic in style. The chain had an annual turnover of £117.3 million in 2007–2008.

== History ==
The company was named after Annice Summers, the secretary of the founder, Michael Caborn-Waterfield. She was born Annice Goodwin in 1941, but later took her stepfather's surname. She left the company soon after it opened, following a row with Caborn-Waterfield. She moved to Umbria, Italy, where she died of cancer in October 2012.

In 2000, Ann Summers acquired the underwear brand Knickerbox for an undisclosed sum. However, in 2014 they announced plans to sell the brand.

=== Retail ===
The first Ann Summers shop was opened in 1970 in Marble Arch, London, from which it grew to six shops.

Ann Summers was purchased in 1971 by brothers Ralph and David Gold, who turned it from a standard sex shop into an established high street brand and lingerie boutique. In 1981, David Gold installed his daughter Jacqueline Gold (who was the Executive Chair of Ann Summers) and she introduced the Party Plan concept. The retail operations for all of Ann Summers' shops are managed from their Head Office in Whyteleafe, Surrey and, as of December 2010, Ann Summers operated 144 retail outlets across the UK, Ireland, the Channel Islands and Spain.

The shops offer lingerie, underwear, cosmetics, swimwear and sex toys. The stores sell two million Rampant Rabbits, a kind of vibrator developed by Jacqueline Gold, per year.

=== Ann Summers parties ===
Jacqueline Gold initiated the Party Plan concept in 1981. The Ann Summers parties were conceived as a means of circumventing regulations restricting the display of sex toys as well as a marketing tactic. Their popularity quickly grew and Ann Summers once had over 7,500 Party Organisers working for Party Plan, coordinated from the Head Office in Surrey. There were around 4,000 Ann Summers parties every week in the UK in 2003.

The Party Plan concept ended in October 2025.

== Controversy ==
Due to the adult nature of the business, Ann Summers has frequently faced opposition, both legal and social. For example, in 2003, they won a legal battle to advertise for employees in job centres and an Advertising Standards Authority (ASA) complaint was rejected.

They have also encountered opposition to their advertising. In 2002, the company received a letter of complaint from Buckingham Palace, following a non-endorsed advertisement featuring Queen Elizabeth II.

In 2003, the company's payments to party organisers were discussed by a number of media sources.

In 2004, two complaints were upheld by the ASA. The ASA decided that the first ad was degrading to women, offensive and unsuitable for use as a poster. In the second case the ASA ruled that the use of a reference to the nursery rhyme "Ride a Cock Horse" was likely to attract the attention of children and that the advertisement was unsuitable for the medium in which it appeared.

An Ann Summers lingerie factory in Portsmouth closed in 2005, with over 50 redundancies.

Additionally, Ann Summers in Perth, Scotland, was forced to close after the local people complained about the store (mostly from parents embarrassed by questions raised by their children), which also led to other problems with the store. Perth was originally the only UK town where an Ann Summers store failed to take off. However, in May 2007 the Middleton Grange, Hartlepool store which opened in November 2005 was closed after less than two years of trading due to poor sales.

In 2006, Muslim groups complained about the release of a blow-up doll named Mustafa Shag, claiming that the doll was offensive to Muslims as Mustafa was one of the names given to the Prophet Mohamed.

In 2007, the company faced legal issues with Apple Inc due to its release of an electronic add-on to music players called the iGasm. The company has not backed down despite cease-and-desist orders by Apple. Also, a former director, who is now a Beate Uhse AG employee is pursuing a libel claim against Jacqueline Gold. An advertisement was banned from the London Underground in the same year.

In 2010, Ann Summers' Halloween advertisement was banned by the Radio Advertising Clearance Centre, which decided the advertisement used "fairly overt sexual references in terms of sound effects."

In 2011 an advertising campaign which featured a pastiche of a Marks and Spencer advertisement was withdrawn after a threat of legal action by M&S.

In 2025, after claims that Marks and Spencer banned transgender women from giving or receiving bra fitting services in response to a complaint about a shop assistant in the clothing section believed to be trans asking a customer if they needed any assistance, Ann Summers said that trans women were welcome to all services offered at their stores.
