= Ralph Gold =

British businessman

Ralph Gold is a British businessman. He is a former director of English football club, Birmingham City. Gold, along with his brother David, purchased the Ann Summers retail sex shop chain in 1971 and later acquired the Knickerbox brand in 2000.

== Ann Summers ==
Gold acquired the Ann Summers chain with his brother David in 1971. In December 2007 David bought out Ralph with Ralph taking a £56.5 million dividend as part of the sale.

== Birmingham City ==
Gold was a director of Birmingham City before selling his 12.50% share for £10 million to Carson Yeung. Gold, his brother David and David Sullivan had acquired the club in 1993 for £1.
