= David Gold (businessman) =

British businessman (1936–2023)

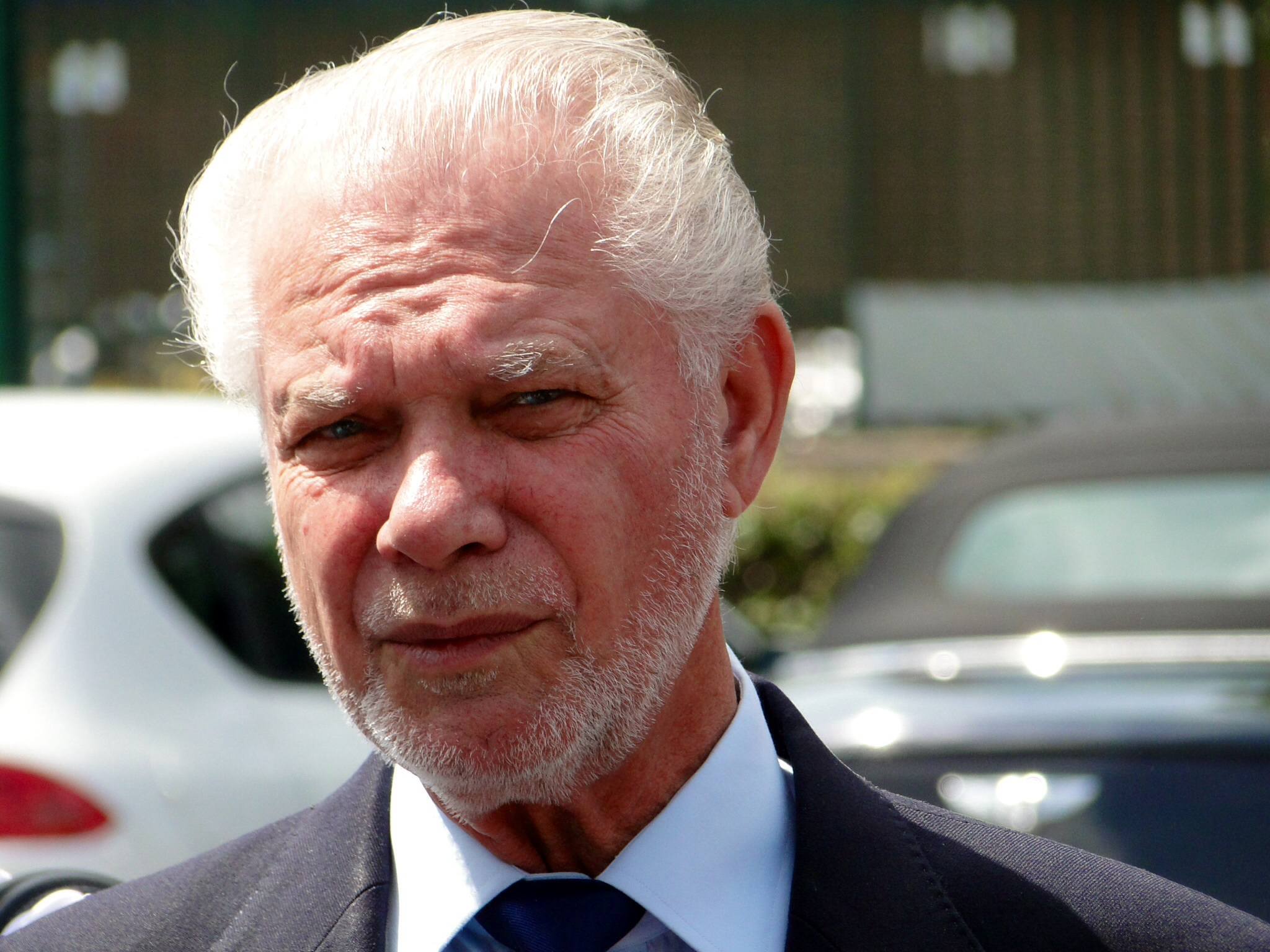
- Gold in 2014
- Born: 9 September 1936; Stepney, London, England
- Died: 4 January 2023 (aged 86)
- Occupations: Joint chairman, West Ham United; Owner and Chairman of Gold Group International, incorporating Ann Summers
- Spouse: Beryl Hunt (m. 1957; div. 1972)
- Partner: Lesley Manning
- Children: Jacqueline Gold and Vanessa Gold
- Website: davidgold.co.uk

David Gold (9 September 1936 – 4 January 2023) was a British businessman who owned Gold Star Publications and Sport Newspapers. He was the chairman of Birmingham City Football Club until 2009. From 2010 to his death in 2023, he was the joint chairman of West Ham United.

== Early life ==
Gold was born in Stepney and brought up in east London at 442 Green Street near to West Ham's Boleyn Ground. He played youth team football for West Ham and was offered forms to sign as an apprentice professional for the first team, which his father refused to counter sign. His father, Godfrey, was an East End criminal, known locally as 'Goldy', who spent time in prison during Gold's early years. His father was Jewish and his mother was Christian.

== Business career ==
Gold owned Gold Group International (GGI), the parent company of the retailer Ann Summers and lingerie chain Knickerbox. GGI was jointly owned by Gold and his brother Ralph, until he bought out Ralph's share in 2008.

Gold co-owned (with brother Ralph) adult magazine company Gold Star Publications (GSP), including printing and distribution businesses, and a stable of titles including pornographic magazines Rustler and Raider. He and his brother sold their interests in November 2006. In 2007, the brothers also sold their share in Sport Newspapers, following falling sales and profits.

Gold owned corporate air service Gold Air International until he sold it in 2006 for £4.4 million to Air Partner.

== Football clubs ==
Gold was a past chairman of Birmingham City F.C. In 2007 the Gold brothers were believed to be in the process of selling their share in Birmingham City which followed Birmingham's return from relegation and lower than expected profits. After the club was relegated once again to the Championship in May 2008, Gold was quoted as saying he was considering stepping down as joint head of the board of Birmingham City. He sold his Birmingham City shares in 2009.

In January 2010, Gold and David Sullivan acquired a 50 per cent share of West Ham United giving them overall operational and commercial control of the club. They were appointed joint chairmen. They increased their share of the club to 30% each in May 2010 at a cost of £8 million. His time as chairman of West Ham was conspicuous due to several incidents. In August 2010 his Rolls-Royce Phantom car was attacked by Aston Villa fans outside a pub near Villa Park after West Ham's 3–0 defeat. The car sustained £8,500 worth of damage. He described the incident as "the most frightening experience of my football life". In November 2010 Gold criticised Birmingham City's new owners for reneging on their promise to keep him on as chairman following the sale of the club. Birmingham City and their acting chairman, Peter Pannu, responded by banning Gold from their ground St Andrew's for Birmingham City's game against West Ham on 6 November. Gold later issued a personal apology to Pannu on West Ham's own website.

After the campaign against Malcolm Glazer's increase in the debt of Manchester United and Portsmouth going into administration in 2010, Gold advocated regulating football clubs' debts. He felt it is "cheating" for a team to take on debts which they could never pay off without external assistance and that he "fears for the league".

In May 2005, Gold bought the second FA Cup trophy at auction for £488,620, saying he wanted to prevent it being bought by overseas buyers. In April 2006, he moved the trophy to the National Football Museum. He sold the trophy for £760,000 in September 2020, and its new buyer Manchester City owner Sheikh Mansour loaned it back to the museum.

== Personal life and death ==
In 1957, Gold married Beryl Hunt. They divorced in 1972 after Gold found her cheating on him with his best friend in his swimming pool, on the same day he caught his father stealing his shares. Hunt died in 2003. They had two children:

- Jacqueline Gold (1960–2023) was CEO of Ann Summers and Knickerbox Ltd until her death in 2023.
- Vanessa Gold (b. 1966) is the managing director of Ann Summers and Knickerbox Ltd. After David Gold's death, she became joint-chair of West Ham United, alongside David Sullivan.

In 2005, Gold wrote his autobiography Pure Gold with co-writer Bob Harris. This dwells on his early childhood poverty, ascent in business and involvement with Birmingham City.

As of May 2012, he lived with his fiancée Lesley Manning, in Caterham, Surrey.

Following West Ham's move from the Boleyn Ground to the London Stadium in 2016, Gold was subjected to protests from groups of West Ham supporters who were unhappy with the move and who accused Gold of having taken money from the club and of being a "liar".

According to the Sunday Times Rich List in 2020, Gold and his family had an estimated net worth of £460 million.

Gold died on 4 January 2023, aged 86.
