= John Bagford =

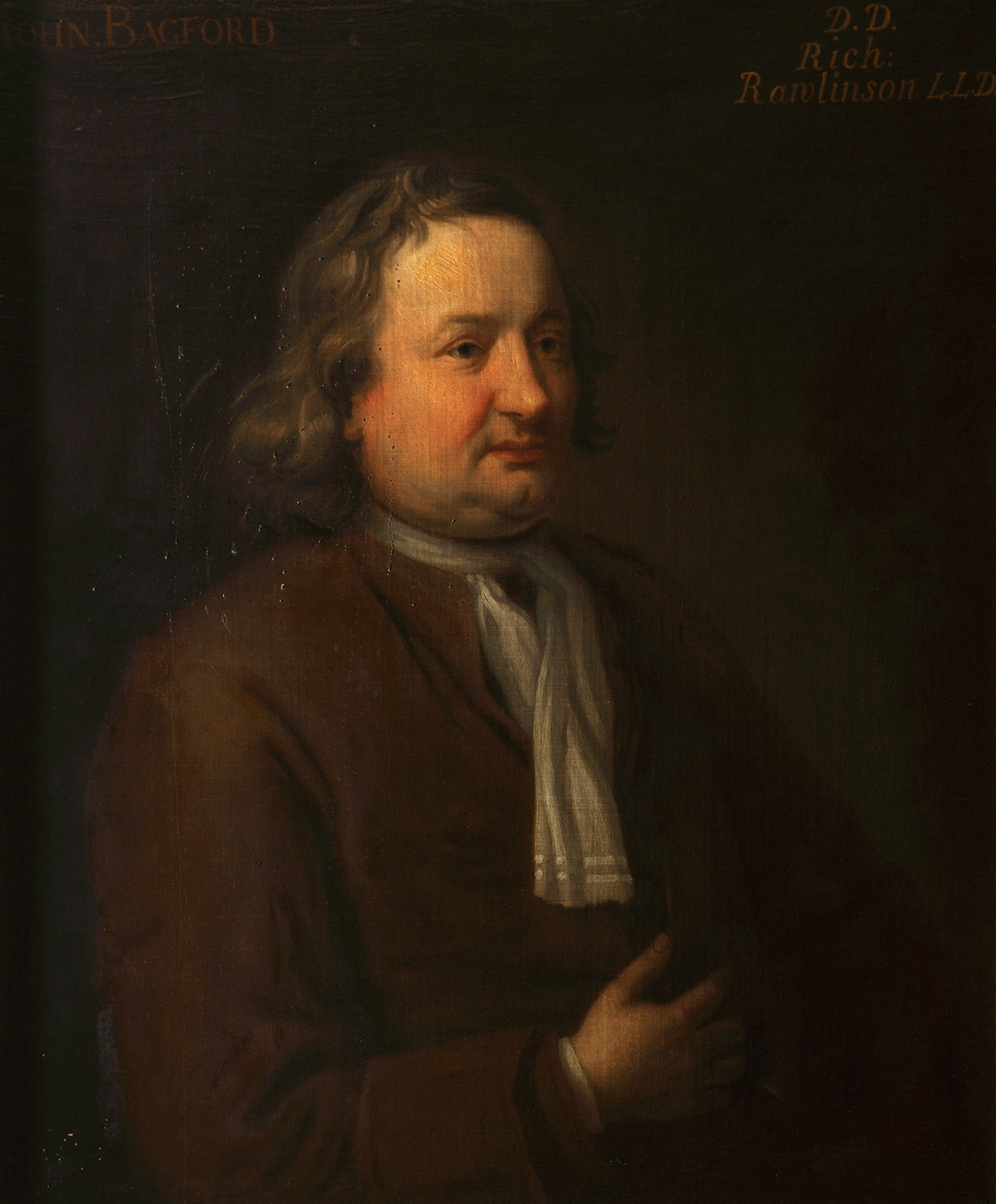
John Bagford, painting by Hugh Howard.

John Bagford FSA (1650/51, Fetter Lane, London – 5 May 1716, Islington) was an English antiquarian, writer, bibliographer, ballad-collector, bookseller, and biblioclast.

== Life ==
Originally a shoemaker by trade, his premises were in the Great Turnstile, an alley in the City of London. That business was not successful so he became active in the book-trading market in Holborn from 1680, travelling to Haarlem, Leiden, and Amsterdam on this business and aiding such collectors as John Moore, Robert and Edward Harley, Sir Hans Sloane, Samuel Pepys and John Woodward. Becoming friends with fellow antiquarians such as Thomas Hearne, Humfrey Wanley and Thomas Baker, he published antiquarian tracts, contributed to others, and edited an edition of Geoffrey Chaucer published by John Urry.

Bagford, together with Humfrey Wanley and John Talman, was one of three founder members of the reconstituted Society of Antiquaries, which first met at the Bear Tavern on the Strand on 5 December 1707.

Bagford's collection contained many fragments of books such as title-pages and this gave him a reputation as a biblioclast for which he was excoriated in William Blades' The Enemies of Books. Likewise, a twentieth-century commentator has said how Bagford is mostly remembered today for "his ability to mangle any book he laid his hands on".

Bagford's bound volumes of ballads, typeface examples and other work, which he curated for his own use, form the British Library Bagford Collection, part of the Harleian Library. Bagford also collected material for Robert Harley, and found ballads on request for other customers including Samuel Pepys. The ballads were published in 1878 by Joseph Woodfall Ebsworth.

== The Gray's Inn elephant tooth and stone tool ==
In 1715 Bagford wrote about the Gray's Inn Lane hand axe and the elephant tooth which had been found together by John Conyers opposite "Black Mary's". He asserted that the elephant was probably introduced by Claudius but that the tool had been made by human workmanship. He described this as a "British weapon" and as such he was one of the first to suggest that Stone Age tools were human-made, rather than produced by other causes (such as lightning).

== See also ==
- Bagford Ballads
