= Ebsworth =

Ebsworth may refer to:

- Dame Ann Ebsworth (1937–2002), English barrister and judge
- Evelyn Ebsworth (1933–2015), British chemist and academic
- Joseph Ebsworth (1788–1868), English dramatist and musician
- Joseph Woodfall Ebsworth (1824–1908), English clergyman, editor of ballads, poet and artist
- Mary Emma Ebsworth (1794–1881), English dramatist
