= Great Turnstile =

Alley in Holborn, London

Coordinates: 51.5180°N 0.11578°W

The entrance to the Great Turnstile is now next to Penderel's Oak. This pub is named after Richard Penderel who sheltered Charles II in an oak tree and lived at number 17, Great Turnstile in 1668.

The Little and Great Turnstiles are the paths on either side of the row of houses on the south side of Houlburne in the 1561 woodcut map of London.

The Tregaskis book shop, "The Caxton Head", on the corner of the New Turnstile and High Holborn

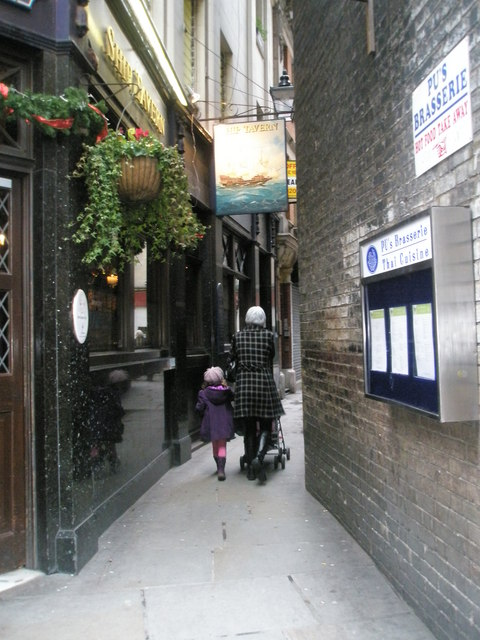
The Ship Tavern is a 16th-century public house on the corner of Little Turnstile and Gate Street.

The Mary Ward Centre at 10, Great Turnstile

Great Turnstile, Little Turnstile and New Turnstile are alleys between High Holborn and Lincoln's Inn Fields in London. They originally had turnstiles to prevent cattle from straying. They later became busy lanes and were built up with shops and housing. Numerous businesses were established there including booksellers, publishers and makers of scientific instruments.

== Names ==
Great Turnstile, Little Turnstile and New Turnstile link the highway of High Holborn and the open ground of Lincoln's Inn Fields. They are named after the turnstiles which were put there in Tudor times to prevent cattle grazing on the fields from escaping into Holborn. The New Turnstile is so-called because it was created later in 1685. Other names for the Great Turnstile include Turngatlane, Turnstile Alley, Turningstile Lane and Turnepike Lane. It was recorded as Turngatlane in 1522 and records show that it was not built up with shops and housing until after 1545.

== Shops ==
Shops and other businesses set up in the Great Turnstile. These included a bookseller, milliner, printer, sempster and shoemaker. In 1829, Brayley wrote that the Great Turnstile's businesses then included a butcher, cutler, fruiterer, pastry-cook, tobacconist and manufacturer of bonnets, dresses and gloves, while the Little Turnstile had brokers and petty chandlers, and the New Turnstile had a variety of small shopkeepers.

== Scientific instruments ==
In 1750, the first civil engineer, John Smeaton, made philosophical instruments at the Great Turnstile. Another instrument maker to set up business there was William Ford Stanley, who rented number 3, Great Turnstile in 1854 and made wooden drawing instruments. This business was not successful initially but Stanley was a resourceful inventor and became a pioneer of making such instruments from aluminium with accurate scales, and expanded his product line to include surveying instruments such as theodolites. In ten years, he had several factories in the area and two more shops in the Great Turnstile. The business went on to become the largest instrument maker in the world so that, in 1914, the American Machinist acclaimed his first shop as a landmark in engineering.

== Booksellers and publishers ==
Both the Great and Little Turnstiles were well known for their booksellers and publishers. In 1636, George Hutton was at the "Sign of the Sun within the Turning Stile at Holborne" and published works such as Europæ Speculum by Sir Edwin Sandys. John Bagford was a shoemaker in the Great Turnstile who went on to become a bookseller and collector there. He made two great collections – one of ballads and another of title pages and other parts of books, which was to form a history of printing. The latter collection of fragments caused him to be suspected, perhaps unfairly, of breaking up books and so he was excoriated as a "wicked old biblioclast" in William Blades' The Enemies of Books. Other booksellers included Crozier in the Little Turnstile and Tregaskis on the corner of the New Turnstile and High Holborn.

For much of the twentieth century, the New Statesman magazine was published from offices at number 10, Great Turnstile. This progressive periodical, which had been founded by the Webbs and other Fabians, was often referred to by its location as "Great Turnstile". Number 10 has since been redeveloped and is now used by the Mary Ward Centre to provide adult education and legal advice.
