= Ship Tavern, Holborn =

Pub in London, England

Coordinates: 51°31′02″N 0°07′08″W

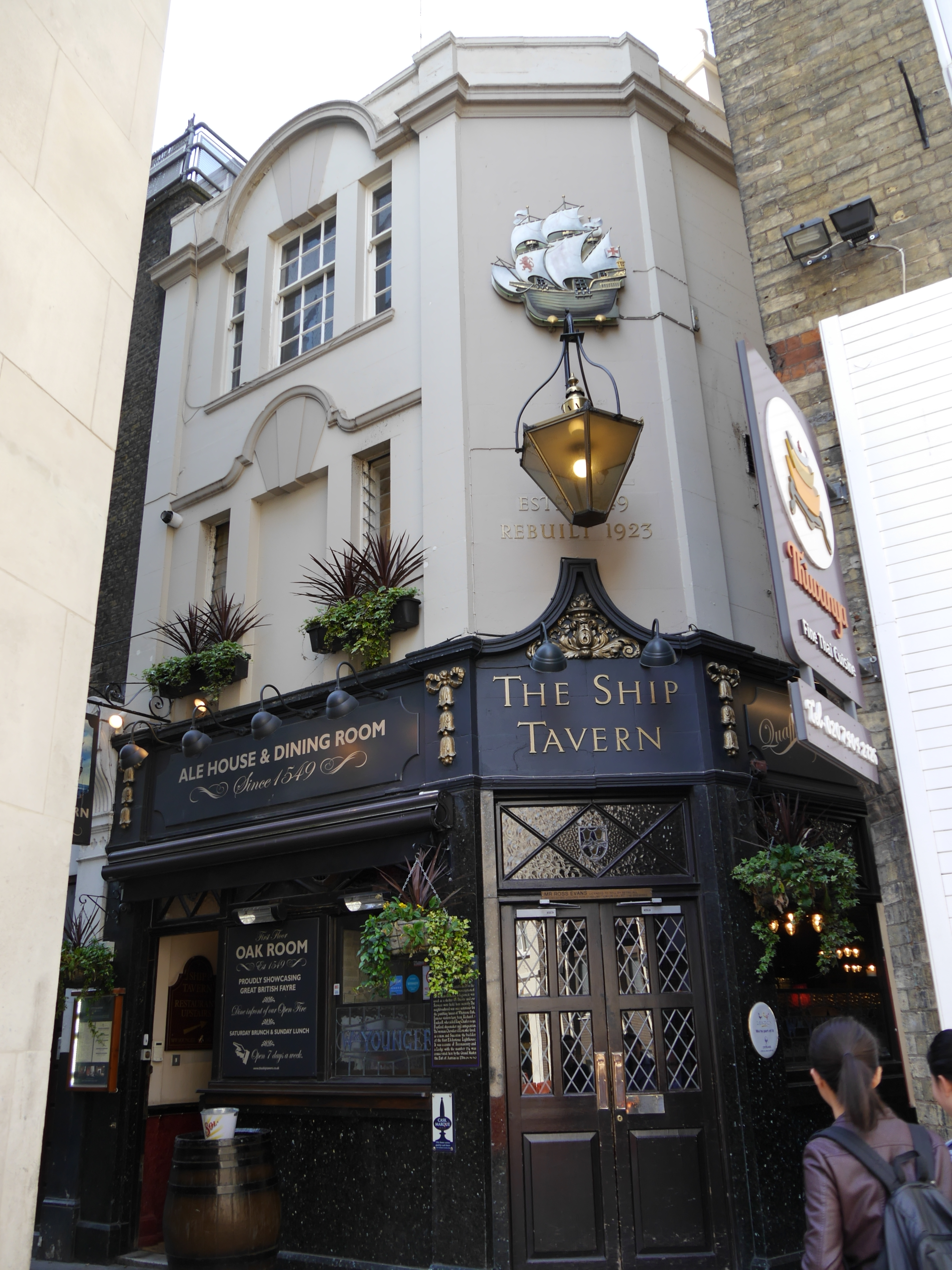
Ship Tavern, Holborn

The Ship Tavern is an inn at the western corner of Lincoln's Inn Fields, at the corner of Gate Street and the Little Turnstile in London. Established in 1549, at the height of the English Reformation, when Catholicism became illegal, it was used to shelter Catholic priests and hold secret Catholic services.

It was originally in Whetstone Park, which was notorious for its gambling houses. Richard Penderell, who aided Charles I's escape, visited it, as did John Bagford (a shoemaker and antiquarian), the Chevalier d'Eon (a man who lived as a woman) and John Smeaton (the builder of the Eddystone Lighthouse). It was consecrated as Masonic lodge 234 in 1786 by the Grand Master, the Earl of Antrim, and rebuilt in 1923.
