= John Kemp (antiquary) =

English antiquarian

John Kemp or Kempe (1665–1717) was an English antiquarian, known as a collector.

Kemp had private wealth, and lived in the parish of St. Martin-in-the Fields, London. He was elected a Fellow of the Royal Society on 20 March 1712, and died unmarried on 19 September 1717.

== Collection and legacy ==
Kemp had a museum of antiquities. It had largely been formed by Jean Gailhard, a Frenchman, who was governor to George Carteret, 1st Baron Carteret. Gailhard sold it to Carteret for an annuity, and Kemp subsequently bought it. The collection drew on that of Jacob Spon, and William Nicolson left an account of it after a visit in 1712. It contained the flint axe found by John Conyers in 1679.

By his will Kemp directed that the museum (with books) should be offered to Lord Oxford or his son for £2,000; The proposal was declined. Robert Ainsworth drew up an elaborate account of Kemp's antiquities entitled Monvmenta vetustatis Kempiana, ex vetustis scriptoribus illustrata, eosque vicissim illustrantia, 2 pts. London, 1719–20: John Ward supplied him with descriptions of the statues and lares, with a discourse De Vasis et Lucernis, de Amuletis, de Annulis et Fibulis, and Commentarius de Asse et partibus ejus which had been printed in 1719.

The collection was then sold by auction at the Phœnix tavern in Pall Mall, London on 23, 24, 25, and 27 March 1721, in 293 lots, for £1,090 8s. 6d. Six classical inscriptions, bought by Dr. Richard Rawlinson, went to Oxford, and appeared in the Marmora Oxoniensia.
