= The Bagford Ballads =

Book by John Bagford

The Bagford Ballads were English ballads collected by John Bagford (1651 - 1716) for Robert Harley, first Earl of Oxford. Bagford was originally a cobbler, but he became a book collector in his later years, and he assembled this set of ballads from the materials he had been collecting. Harley was interested in all sorts of antiquarian literature, and the Harleian collection is a major contribution to scholarship.

The Bagford Ballads are generally folk compositions that document the last years of the Stuart reign in the close of the 17th century (a subject that was not remote for Harley). Therefore, in contrast to what Thomas Percy would collect, these ballads were not primarily antiquarian or efforts at preserving a vanished literature. Rather, they seem to have been selected for their value as genuine folk art and populist ephemera.

After Harley's death, the Bagford Ballads were obtained by the Duke of Roxburge. They were published by the Ballad Society in 1878, edited by Joseph Woodfall Ebsworth.
