= Samuel Patrick =

British schoolmaster, scholar, and lexicographer

Samuel Patrick (1684–1748) was a British schoolmaster, scholar, and lexicographer.

== Life ==
Patrick was for some years usher (second master) at Charterhouse School. Late in life he was granted the degree of LL.D. from the University of St. Andrews and took holy orders, but received no preferment. He died at Kentish Town on 20 March 1748.

== Works ==
Patrick was deeply if narrowly read, and gained reputation as a scholar by his Terence's Comedies translated into English prose as near as the propriety of the two languages will admit, London, 1745, 2 vols., and his edition of Robert Ainsworth's Latin Dictionary, London, 1746. George Colman the Elder slighted the Terence translation as designed for school students. Patrick also edited the Lexicon Manuale Græcum of Benjamin Hedericus, London, 1727, and the Geographia Antiqua of Christoph Cellarius, 6th edit. London, 1731.

Patrick was one of the collaborators of George Thompson (died 1739), of Tottenham School, in the preparation of his Apparatus ad Linguam Græcam ordine novo digestus, London, 1732. Recensions of the Clavis Homerica, London, 1771, and the Colloquia of Erasmus, London, 1773, were also printed as by Patrick.

== Notes ==
Attribution

This article incorporates text from a publication now in the public domain: Lee, Sidney, ed. (1895). "Patrick, Samuel". Dictionary of National Biography. Vol. 44. London: Smith, Elder & Co.
