= Saltley handaxe =

Paleolithic artifact

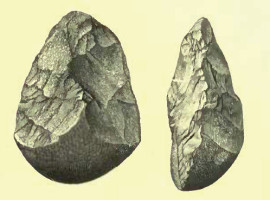
- The handaxe as illustrated by John Evans in 1897
- Material: Quartzite
- Length: c. 10 cm
- Created: c. 500,000 years ago by Homo heidelbergensis
- Period/culture: Paleolithic
- Discovered: 1890; Birmingham, England, United Kingdom
- Present location: Birmingham Museum & Art Gallery, England, United Kingdom

The Saltley handaxe is a quartzite hand axe found in the gravels of the valley of the River Rea in the Saltley area of Birmingham, England in 1890. Believed to be around 500,000 years old, it was the first Homo artifact from the Paleolithic era found in the English Midlands, which had previously been considered not to have been inhabited before the end of the last glacial period.

The axe is around 10 cm long and was formed from a brown piece of quartzite. It would have been used by members of the Homo species Homo heidelbergensis, but its rounded edges and manufacture from a material not present locally suggest that it was not found in situ, but was transported to its find site by the action of glacial meltwater. The find was documented and illustrated by the archaeologist John Evans in his book Ancient Stone Implements of Britain in 1897, who commented that "the question now arises whether the assumed absence of Palaeolithic implements over this area may not be due to their not having yet been found, and not to their non-existence".

It is now in the collection of Birmingham Museum & Art Gallery.

== See also ==
- Gray's Inn Lane Hand Axe in London
