= Turnstile =

Crowd flow management mechanism

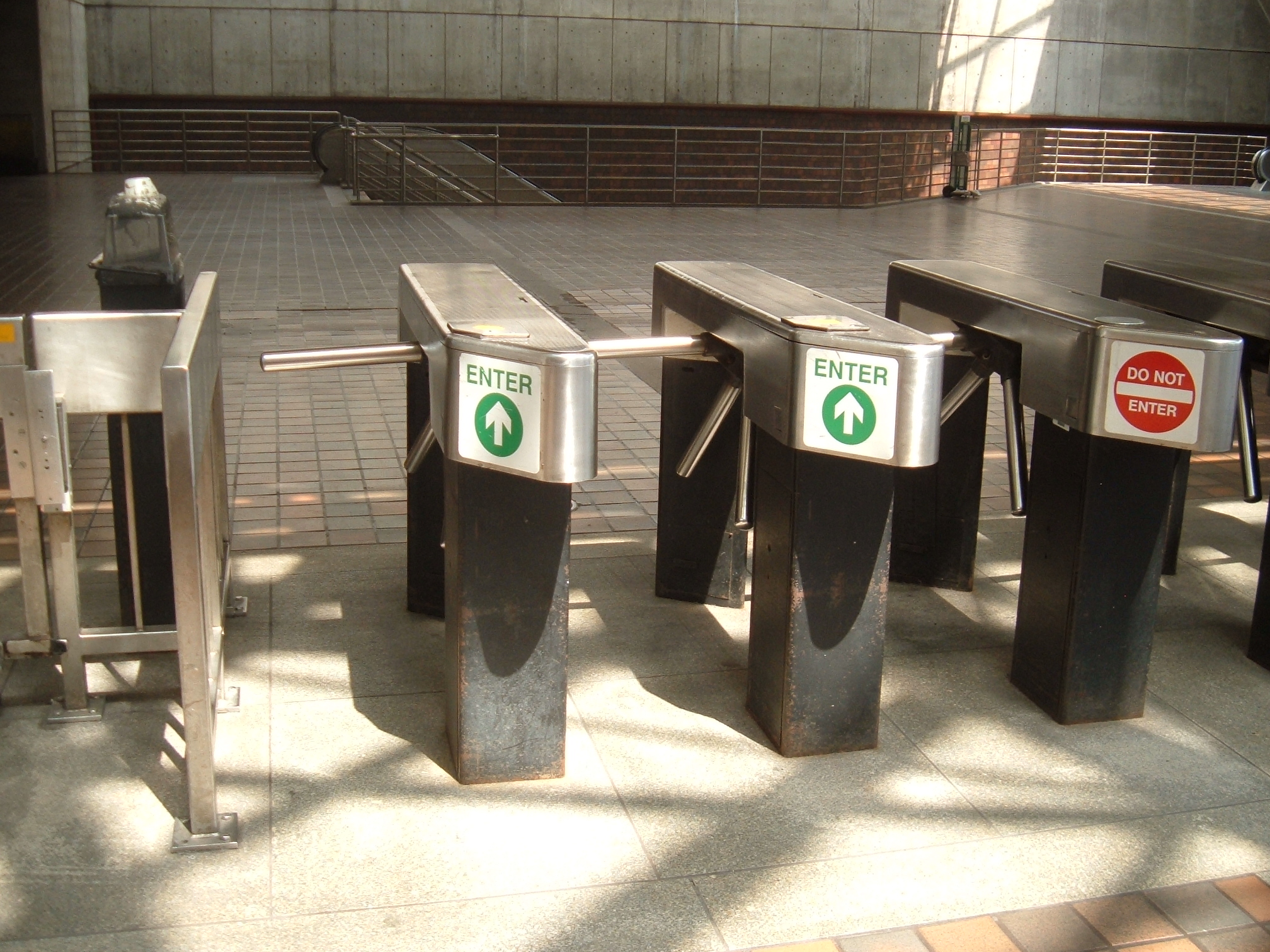
Old turnstiles at Alewife station on the MBTA Red Line in Cambridge, MA, U.S.

A turnstile (also called a gateline, baffle gate, automated gate, turn gate in some regions) is a form of gate which allows one person to pass at a time. A turnstile can be configured to enforce one-way human traffic. In addition, a turnstile can restrict passage only to people who insert a coin, ticket, transit pass, security credential, or other method of payment or verification. Modern turnstiles can incorporate biometrics, including retina scanning, fingerprints, and other individual human characteristics which can be scanned.

A turnstile can be used in the case of paid access (sometimes called a faregate or ticket barrier when used for this purpose), for example to access public transport, a pay toilet, or to restrict access to authorized people, for example in the lobby of an office building.

== History ==
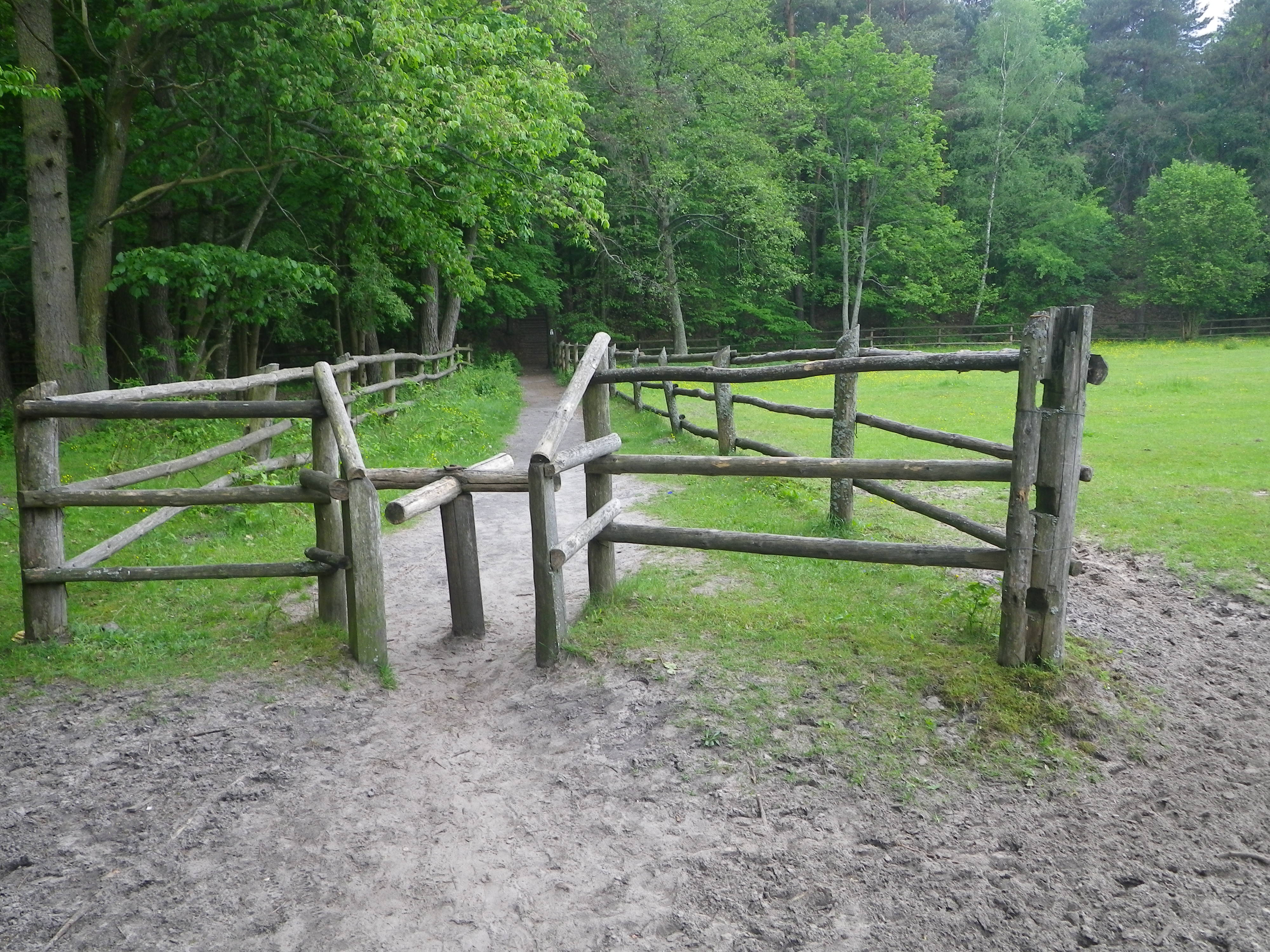
A wooden turnstile for keeping livestock penned in (Zwierzyniec, Poland).

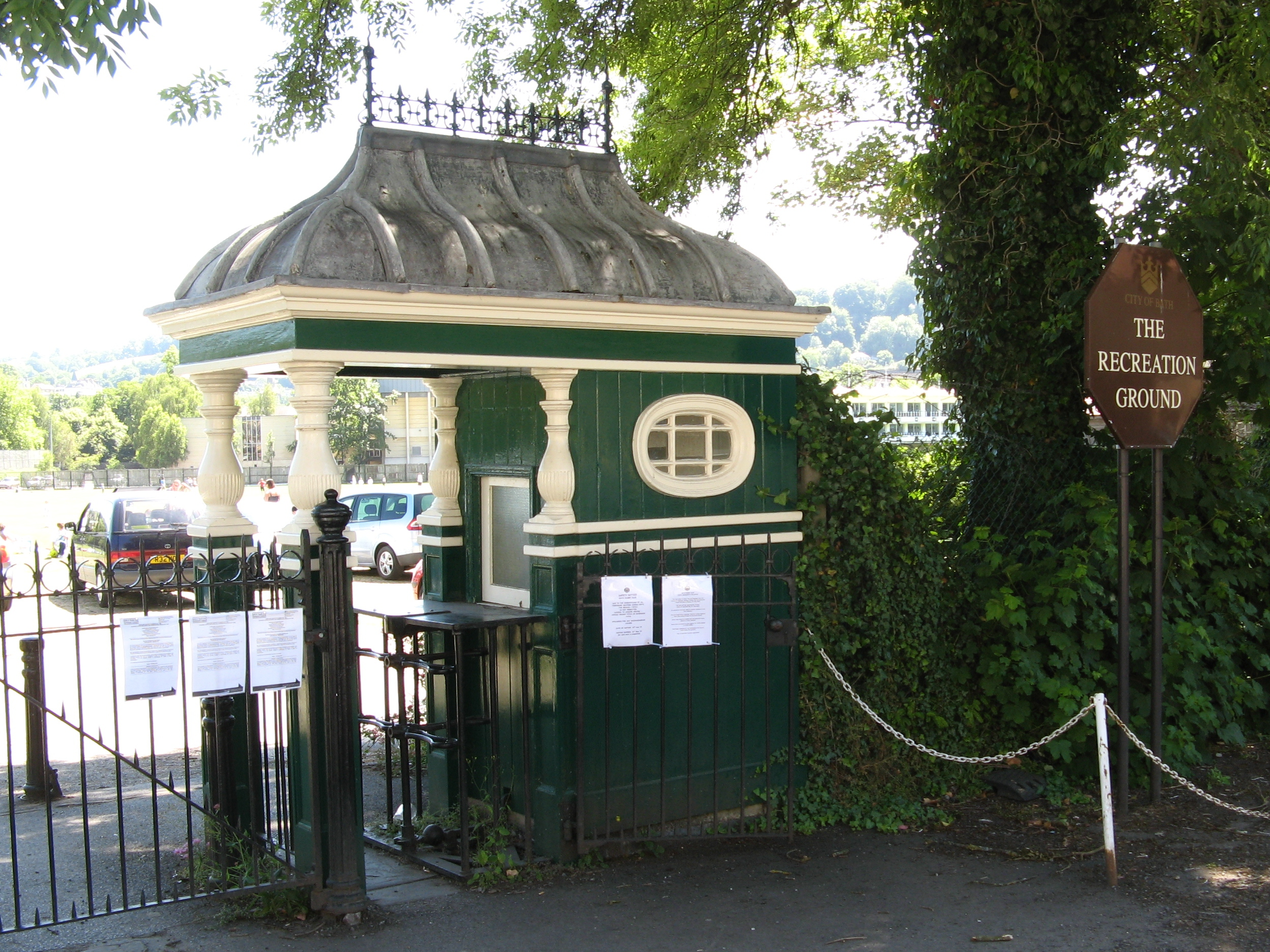
A circa-1930 turnstile and kiosk at the Bath Recreation Ground

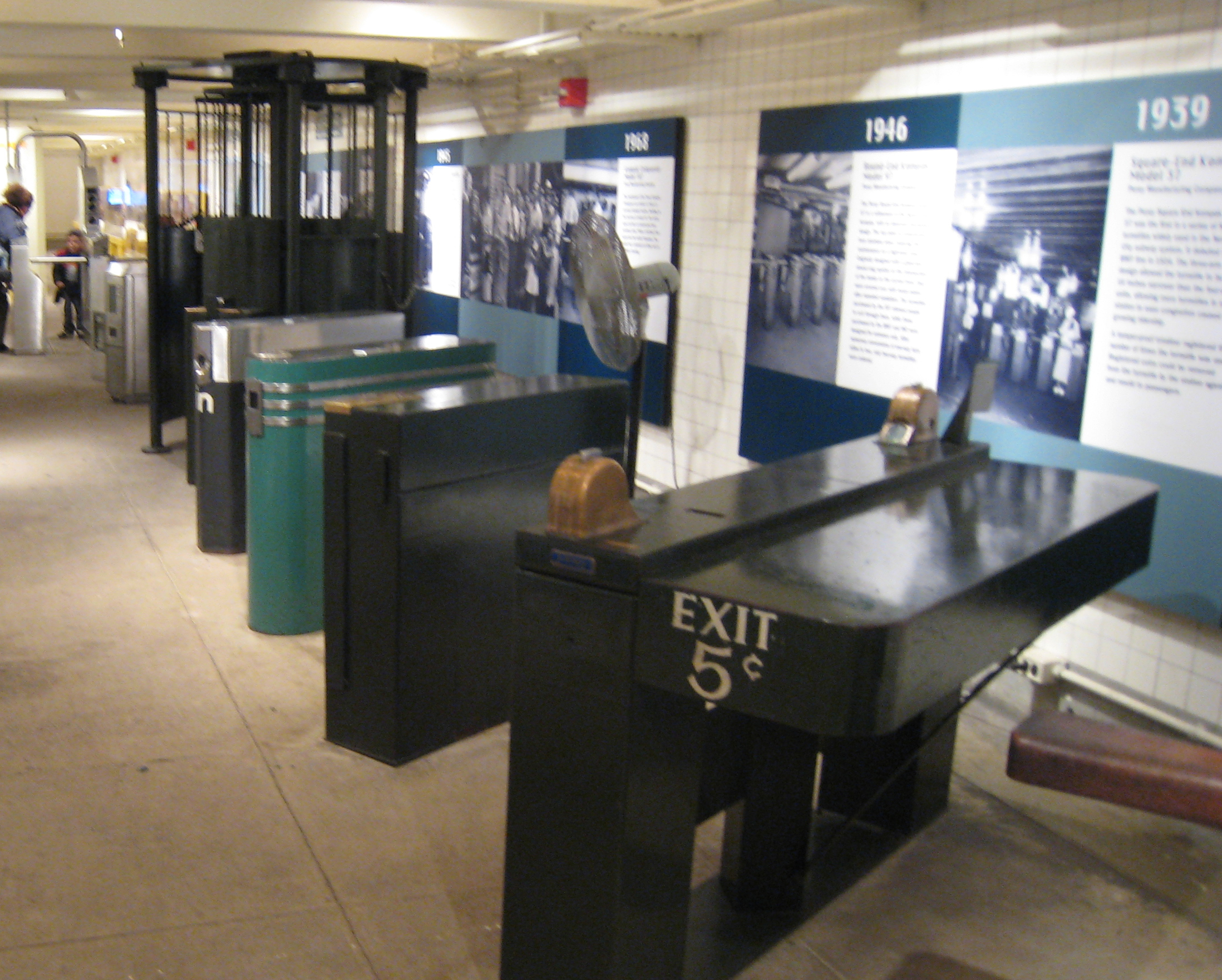
An array of historic NY subway turnstiles, from 1939

Turnstiles were originally used, like other forms of stile, to allow human beings to pass while excluding livestock, grave yards being one application. They may have been used from the early modern period to control access to toll roads, and retail streets, the Holborn Great Turnstile appearing in 16th-century literature Turnstiles were adopted as a means to control access to building and amusements during the 19th century, with many sports stadiums and swimming pools installing them, patents for improvements to the concept being granted to manufacturers. Coin and later ticket operated turnstiles appeared on mass transit systems during the 20th century, magnetic strip encoded tickets and passes replacing earlier perforated tickets, during the late 1960s, in Tokyo. The use of turnstiles, in 20th-century United States, has been credited to Clarence Saunders, who used them in his first Piggly Wiggly store.

== Applications ==
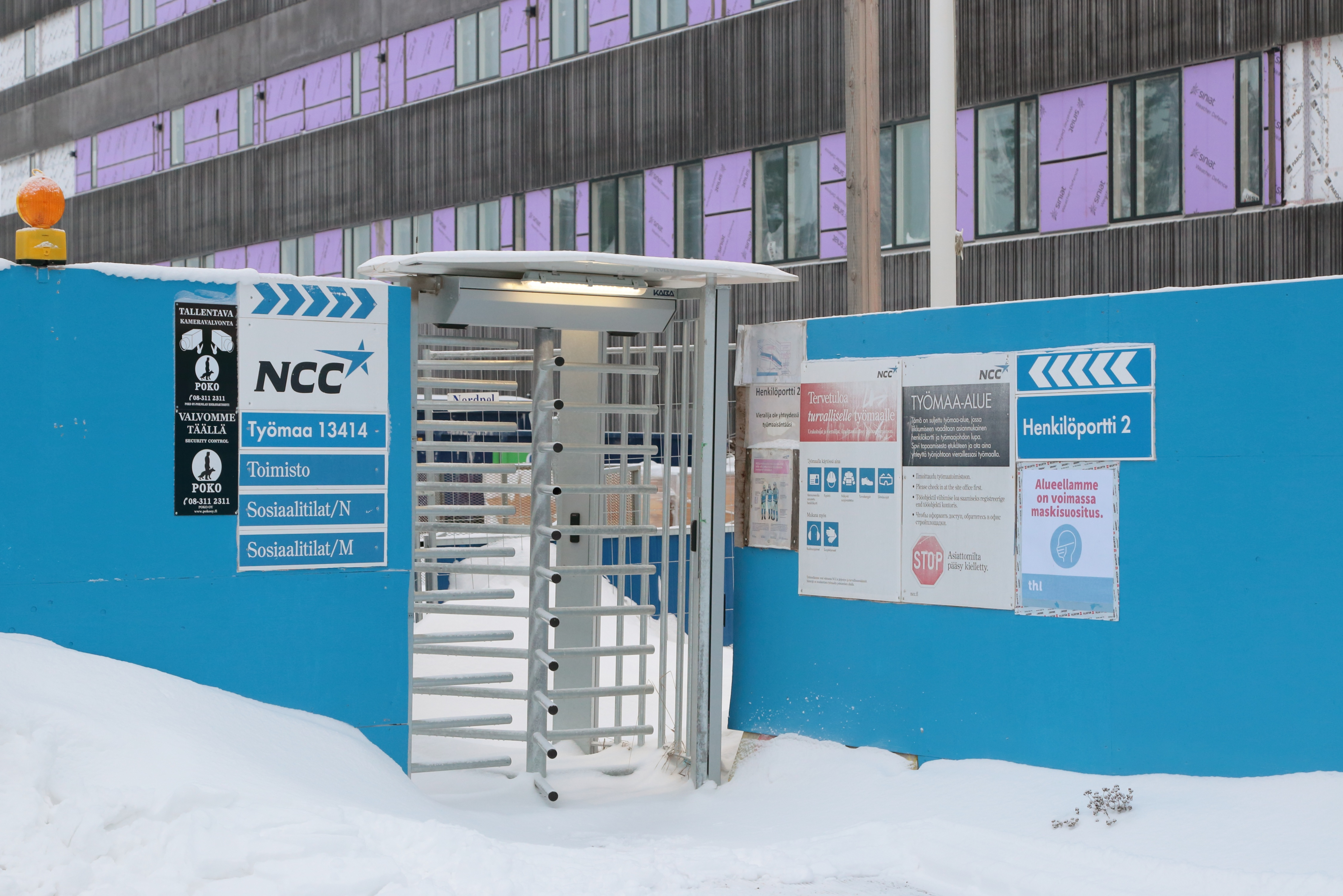
Full-height turnstile in a fenceline

Turnstiles are used at a wide variety of settings, including stadiums, amusement parks, mass transit stations, office lobbies, airports, ski resorts, (Note: In 1974 the Alfi company created the first electronic access control system with turnstile for ski lifts and tows in San Vigilio di Marebbe.) factories, power plants, casinos, construction sites, and zoos.

From a business/revenue standpoint, turnstiles give an accurate, verifiable count of attendance. From a security standpoint, they lead patrons to enter single-file, so security personnel have a clear view of each patron. This enables security to efficiently isolate potential trouble or to confiscate any prohibited materials. On the other hand, physical barriers become a serious safety issue when a speedy evacuation is needed, requiring emergency exits that bypass any turnstiles. The ticket barriers on the London Underground and some busy UK railway stations have to be open if either the gates are unstaffed or in an emergency.

Persons with disabilities may have difficulties using turnstiles. In these cases, generally a wide aisle gate or a manual gate may be provided. At some locations where luggage is expected, a line of turnstiles may be entirely formed of wide aisle gates, for example at Heathrow Terminals 2 & 3 Underground station.

Turnstiles often use ratchet mechanisms to allow the rotation of the stile in one direction allowing ingress but preventing rotation in the other direction. They are often designed to operate only after a payment has been made, usually by inserting a coin or token in a slot; or by swiping, tapping, or inserting a paper ticket or electronically-encoded card.

Turnstiles are often used for counting the numbers of people passing through a gate, even when payment is not involved. They are used extensively in this manner in amusement parks, in order to keep track of how many people enter and exit the park and ride each ride. The 1873, old Hampden Park stadium in Glasgow, Scotland, was one of the first football stadiums to install turnstiles.

== Types ==
=== Waist-high ===
Waist-high turnstiles are often used in fairs, attractions, and arenas. The user inserts a ticket or pass into the slot, from which a barcode is read; if access is to be granted, a sensor determines the speed with which the user passes through, and sets the electric motor to turn the turnstile at the corresponding speed. Sometimes also referred to as "half-height" turnstiles, this fixed arm style has traditionally been the most popular type of turnstile. There are many variations of this style available, including one which is designed to be accompanied by a matching ticket box, and one with a ticket box built in. Some styles are designed to allow entry only after a payment (actual coins and tokens) are inserted, while others allow access after a valid barcode is electronically read. A disadvantage to this type is people can "jump the turnstile" as happens commonly on the Moscow Metro and other mass transport systems in Russia.

=== Wall mount tripod turnstile ===
The wall mount tripod turnstiles are suitable for places where installation on ground becomes impossible. The turnstile is directly fixed to the wall and all functions are achieved. Such turnstiles are usually used in narrow lanes and where wall installation is more feasible.

=== Optical ===
Optical turnstiles are an alternative to the traditional "arm"-style turnstile and are increasingly used in locations where a physical barrier is deemed unnecessary or unaesthetic. Optical turnstiles generally use an infrared beam to count patrons and recognize anyone attempting to enter a site without a valid entry pass.

=== Drop-arm optical ===
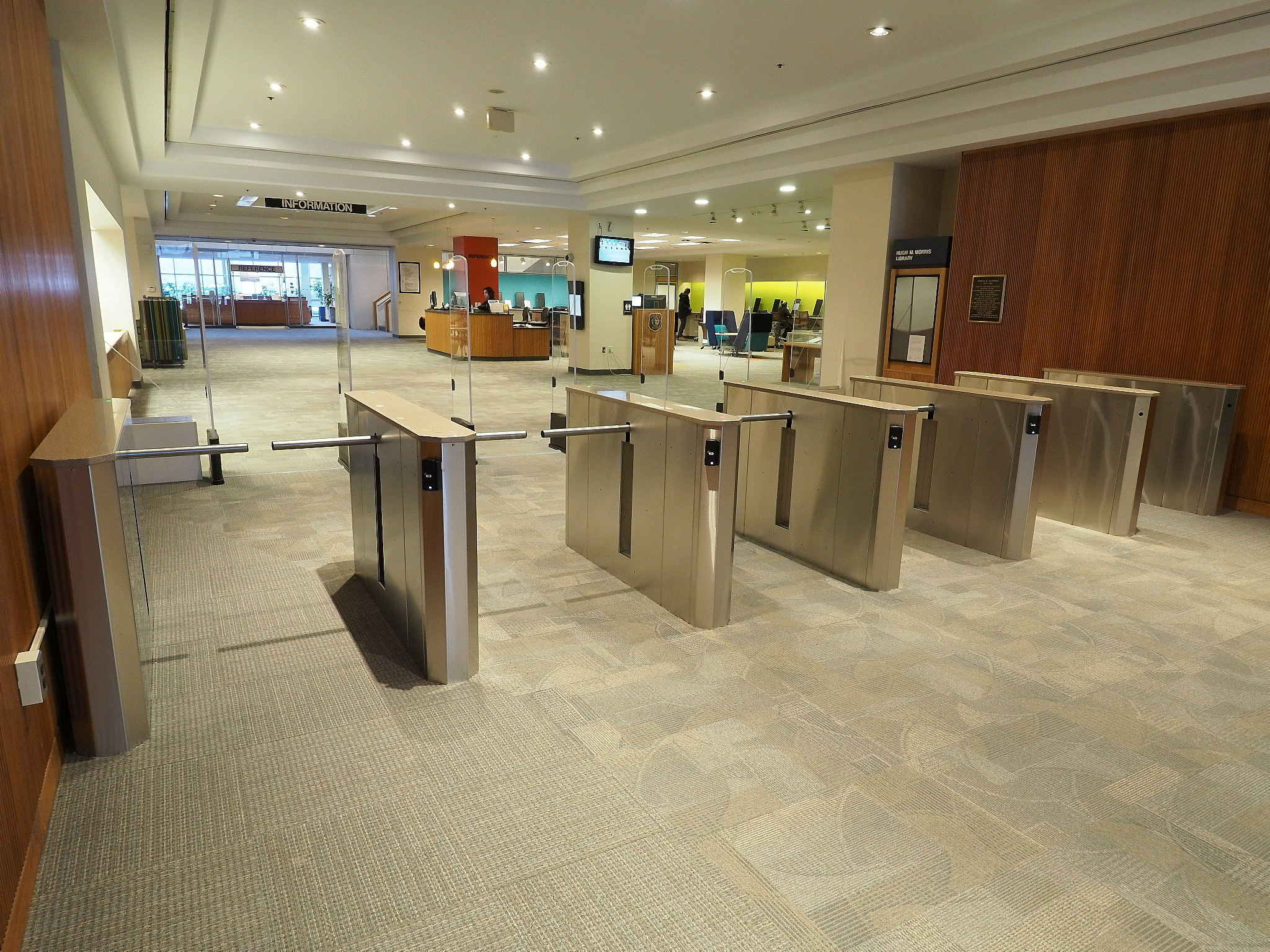
Optical drop-arm turnstile

The drop-arm optical turnstile is a combination of the security of a tripod or barrier turnstile and a fully optical turnstile. The lanes can have either single or double arms. When access is granted the arms drop into recesses in the cabinet. Once the arms drop out of the way, the turnstile functions as a fully optical turnstile.

=== Full-height turnstiles ===
The full-height turnstile – a larger version of the waist-high turnstile, commonly 7 feet (2.1 m) high – is based on the same principle as the revolving door. Furthermore, full-height turnstiles offer better security inasmuch as they can neither be climbed over nor ducked under, and can be designed to lock after each person enters such that the following person must themselves pay a fee or present credentials. Too, they may be designed to allow traffic in both directions, or in a single direction. It is sometimes called a "rotogate", especially in Chicago, where it is used at unstaffed exits of Chicago "L" stations, and is also used increasingly in New York City Subway stations since the turn of the 21st century.

== See also ==
- Optical turnstile
- Revolving door
- Mantrap (access control)
- Stile
- Toll road
- Turnstile (symbol)
