= John Conyers (apothecary) =

English apothecary and archaeologist

John Conyers (c. 1633–1694) was an English apothecary and pioneering archaeologist. He was known "to collect such Antiquities as were daily found in and about London."

== Artefacts and antiquities ==
Conyers had a shop in Fleet Street, near St Paul's Cathedral during the period of construction of Sir Christopher Wren's new cathedral to replace Old St Paul's Cathedral after the Great Fire of London, and collected the medieval and Roman artefacts unearthed, recording the finds in notebooks. They included a Roman kiln found 26 feet (8 metres) below surface level in the 1670s. According to his younger friend John Bagford, Conyers "made it his chief Business to make curious Observations and to collect such Antiquities as were daily found in and about London." His antiquarian collection won praise from the Athenian Mercury and there was talk of opening it to the public, although this does not seem to have happened.

Conyers was present at the excavation in 1679 of the remains of a supposed elephant from a gravel bed at Battlebridge (King's Cross). The site was near Gray's Inn Lane, opposite "Black Mary's". The remaining tooth was later thought to be of a mammoth or straight-tusked elephant. A flint handaxe was found nearby, now famous as the Gray's Inn Lane handaxe and on display in the British Museum's Enlightenment Gallery. Conyers was the first to argue that it was a human artefact. John Bagford then somewhat later argued for an origin of the assemblage in the Roman presence under the Emperor Claudius; this was in a letter of 1715, in which Bagford accepted the human origin of the handaxe.

The handaxe came into the antiquarian museum of John Kemp. With other items from Conyers' collection, it passed to Sir Hans Sloane, whose personal objects became one of the founding collections of the British Museum. Conyers's notes on his discoveries are now in the British Library as Sloane manuscripts Ms 959 and Harley manuscripts Ms 5953.

Conyers married a niece of Francis Glisson. A celebrated shield, bought by Conyers from a London ironmonger, was sold after his death by one of his daughters to John Woodward. Dr Woodward's Shield, also now in the British Museum, is now recognised as a classicising French Renaissance buckler of the mid-16th century, perhaps sold from the Royal Armouries of Charles II, but was thought by Woodward and others to be an original Roman work.
