= Nathaniel Thomas (writer) =

Nathaniel Thomas (1730 – after 1768) was a Welsh writer and editor.

== Life ==
Thomas, from Glamorgan in south Wales, studied at Jesus College, Oxford, matriculating there in 1747; the university records do not note the award of a degree but later biographers said that he had a Bachelor of Arts degree. He was the editor and proprietor of the St James's Chronicle in London, and edited an abridged version of Robert Ainsworth's Latin Dictionary (1758). In 1761, he published a corrected edition of the dictionary and in 1768 published an edition of works by Eutropius, together with a translation and notes.
