= Saltley =

Area of Birmingham, England

Coordinates: 52.4919°N 1.8577°W

- Location within the West Midlands
- Metropolitan borough: Birmingham
- Metropolitan county: West Midlands
- Region: West Midlands
- Country: England
- Sovereign state: United Kingdom
- Post town: Birmingham
- Postcode district: B8
- Dialling code: 0121
- Police: West Midlands
- Fire: West Midlands
- Ambulance: West Midlands
- UK Parliament: Birmingham Ladywood

Saltley is an inner-city area of Birmingham, England, east of the city centre. The area is part of the Washwood Heath ward, and was previously part of the Nechells ward. It is part of the Ladywood constituency in the city.

== History ==
Saltley was originally an unverified parish within the estate of the Adderley family and their descendants, who had built their original residence Saltley Hall on the site of what is now Adderley Park. As water became a key resource, the family moved their residence to Hams Hall for better access to the River Tame. When the English Civil War occurred, the Adderleys like most gentry chose to support the Royalist cause, and paid heavy fines afterwards for being on the losing side.

In 1845 railway carriage makers Joseph Wright and Sons relocated from London to a factory built on meadowlands in Saltley; the company eventually became Metro-Cammell, who remained in Saltley until 1962.

As Birmingham developed as an industrial location, Saltley became an overspill area for workers, although still owned by the Adderley family. Charles Bowyer Adderley (later 1st Baron Norton) in 1855 donated land for the development of Adderley Park, as well as churches. Lord Norton oversaw the then-modern late–19th century layout of square-set streets and well-spaced houses, which after the Second World War was viewed as a slum.

St Peter's College was both a teacher training college and school, which was developed from 1852. The school closed in 1941 after destruction by a Luftwaffe bomb, while the college closed in 1978 to become part of Aston University. The building today encompasses houses, meeting rooms and council facilities.

== Present day ==
Saltley is a largely business area with a high level of outlets in a densely populated area. Saltley begins at the Saltley Viaduct, marked with the Saltley Gate, a local landmark, at the entrance to Alum Rock Road and Washwood Heath Road. There are many older houses from around the turn of the 20th century still in existence around Saltley. During the 1950s and 1960s many of these houses were bought by immigrants from the Commonwealth of Nations (mostly from Pakistan and Bangladesh) who have formed a strong community over the last half-century.

The neighbourhood is home to mainly terraced properties and some new housing projects, trade and Christian and Muslim places of worship. Situated in the area are a number of primary schools and St. Peter's College. (St Peter's College is no longer used as a college, but the site is used for sheltered housing, small business offices, such as CSV Environment, and a small playing field.) Recreation includes the Wheel's Adventure Park and smaller domestic parks. The area was host to an annual parade, known as the Saltley Festival.

== Places of interest ==
Adderley Street was the site of the 1890 discovery of the Saltley Handaxe, the first paleolithic human artefact to be found in the English Midlands.

Saltley Gate Coke Depot was the site of the Battle of Saltley Gate, one of the largest mass pickets during the 1970s. This was part of the 1972 United Kingdom miners' strike.

== Transport ==
Saltley is served by Adderley Park railway station on the Birmingham New street to Coventry railway line and just half a mile up the road in Duddeston the Duddeston Station on the cross city line. Bus routes into the area include the National Express West Midlands 8A/8C, 14, 94 and 95.

Saltley was served by Saltley railway station between 1854 and 1968.

== See also ==
- Saltley Academy
- Saltley Gate Peace Group
- St Saviour's Church, Saltley
