= Benjamin Wrigglesworth Beatson =

- Born: 24 January 1803
- Died: 24 July 1874 (aged 71)

Benjamin Wrigglesworth Beatson (24 January 1803 – 24 July 1874) was an English classical scholar.

Beatson was born in London, the son of Anby Beatson, a Cheapside merchant. He was educated first at Merchant Taylors' School, and afterwards at Pembroke College, Cambridge, where he graduated B.A. in 1825 and M.A. in 1828. He was elected a fellow of his college soon after taking his first degree, and was senior fellow at the time of his death (24 July 1874). He compiled the Index Græcitatis Æschyleæ, which was published at Cambridge in 1830 in the first volume of the Index in Tragicos Græcos. An edition of Robert Ainsworth's Thesaurus Linguæ Latinæ, revised by Beatson, was issued in 1829, and republished in 1830 and in 1860.

His other works were:

1. Progressive Exercises on the Composition of Greek Iambic Verse . . . For the use of King's School, Canterbury, Cambridge, 1836; a popular school book, which reached a tenth edition in 1871
2. Exercises on Latin Prose Composition, 1840.
3. Lessons in Ancient History, 1853.
4. An edition of Demosthenes' Oration against the Law of Leptines, 1864. (Note: Athenaeum, 1 August 1874) (Note: Luard's Grad. Cantab. 1760–1856) (Note: British Museum Catalogue)
