= Joseph Woodfall Ebsworth =

English painter

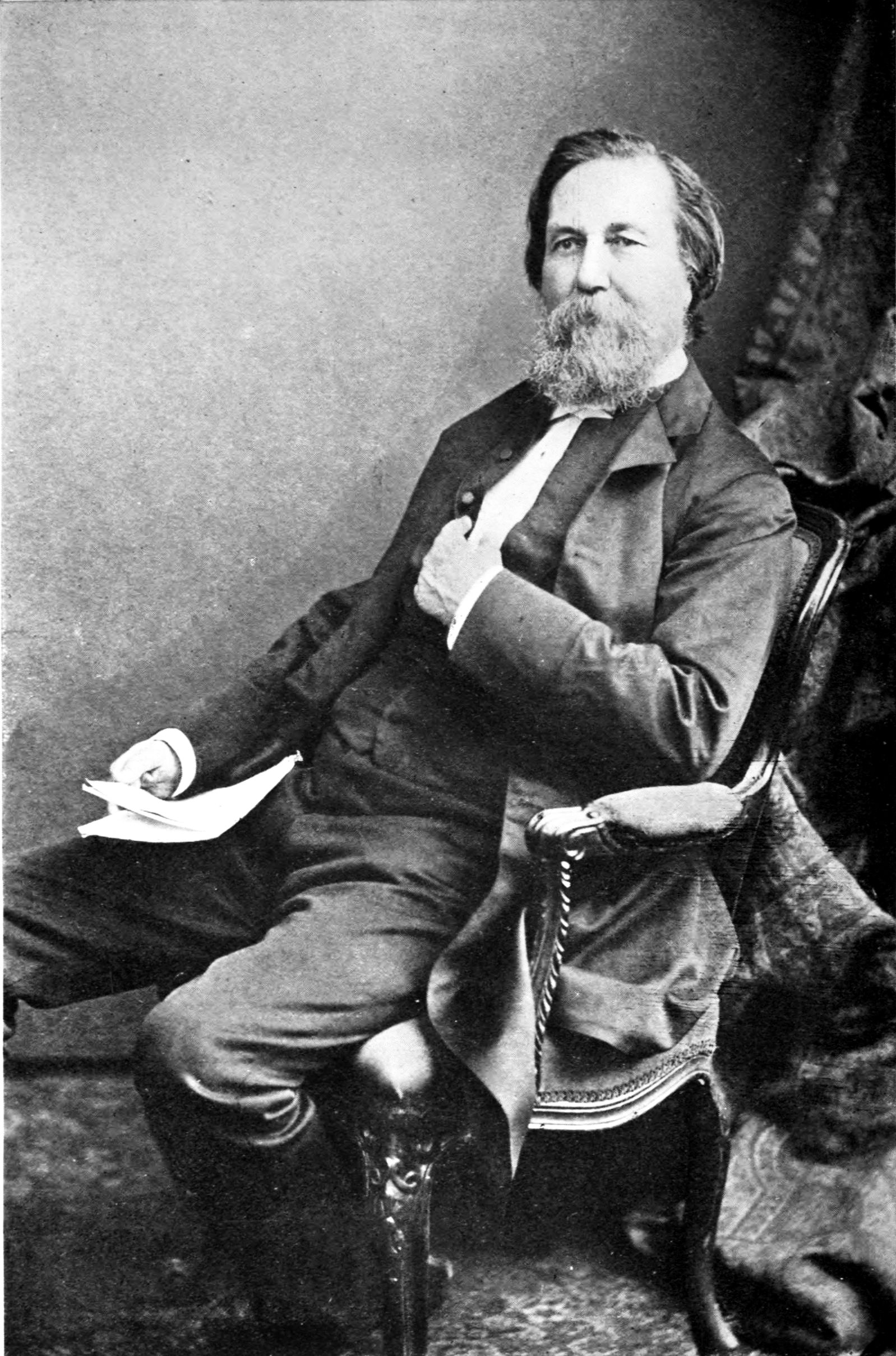
- Joseph Woodfall Ebsworth
- Born: 2 September 1824; Lambeth, London
- Died: 7 June 1908 (aged 83); Ashford
- Occupations: British priest and writer

Joseph Woodfall Ebsworth (2 September 1824 – 7 June 1908) was an English clergyman, known as an editor of ballads, poet and artist.

== Early life ==
Born on 2 September 1824 at 3 Gray's Walk, Lambeth, he was a younger son (in a family of 13 children) of Joseph Ebsworth and Mary Emma Ebsworth, writer for the stage; Thomas Woodfall, son of Henry Sampson Woodfall, was his godfather. In 1828 the family moved to Edinburgh.

At 14 Ebsworth entered the board of trustees' school of art, where he studied successively under Charles Heath Wilson, Sir William Allan, and David Scott. In 1848 he went to Manchester to serve as chief artist to Faulkner Bros., a firm of lithographers who were busy with railway plans during the Railway Mania. He soon left for Glasgow, where he became a master at the School of Design.

In July 1853 Ebsworth started on a solitary walking tour through central Europe and Italy. He returned to Edinburgh in 1854, and busied himself until 1860 with painting, engraving, and writing prose and verse for the press.

== Clergyman and scholar ==
Then his plans changed; and Ebsworth matriculated at St John's College, Cambridge. He graduated B.A. in 1864 and M.A. in 1867. On 31 July 1864 he was ordained deacon, and in 1868 priest. He was successively curate of Market Weighton (1864–5), of St. Stephen's, Bowling, near Bradford (1866–7), and of All Saints (1868–9) and Christ Church (1870–1), both in Bradford.

In January 1871 Ebsworth became vicar of Molash near Ashford. The parishioners were few and poor, and he raised money outside the parish to build a vicarage. Most of his time at Molash was spent on literary work, and research in the British Museum. He was elected a Fellow of the Society of Antiquaries of London in 1881.

== Last years ==
In 1894 Ebsworth retired from Molash vicarage to live privately at Ashford. There he died on 7 June 1908; he was buried in Ashford cemetery. His library was sold in 1907. A portrait in early life was painted by Thomas Duncan.

== Works ==
In 1849 Ebsworth exhibited for the first time at the Scottish Academy, sending four large water-colour views of Edinburgh. One of these pictures (the north view) he engraved privately. In 1850 he sent a picture illustrating Alfred Tennyson's Locksley Hall.

Ebsworth published at Edinburgh two collections of prose and verse, Karl's Legacy (2 vols. 1867) and Literary Essays and Poems (1868). He then produced a series of reprints of popular poetic literature. In 1875, he published editions of The Westminster Drolleries of 1671 and 1672, and The Merry Drolleries of 1661 and 1670. The Choyce Drolleries of 1656 followed next year.

For the Ballad Society, Ebsworth edited the Bagford Ballads from the British Museum (2 pts. 1876–8), together with the Amanda Group of Bagford Poems (1880). His major work for the Ballad Society was the completion of its edition of the Roxburghe collection of ballads in the British Museum. William Chappell had edited three volumes (1860–79); from 1879 onwards Ebsworth continued Chappell's work and published volumes iv. to ix. of the Roxburghe collections between 1883 and 1899. The separate pieces numbered 1400, and Ebsworth classified them under historical and other headings, bringing together, for example, Early Naval Ballads (1887), Early Legendary Ballads (1888), Robin Hood Ballads (1896), and Restoration Ballads (1899). Ebsworth added introductions, and notes reflecting his Tory politics, as well as original verse, and his hand woodcuts after the original illustrations. He printed in 1887, for private circulation, 150 copies of Cavalier Lyrics for Church and Crown.

Other works were:

- an edition of Shakespeare's Midsummer Night's Dream of 1600 (Furnivall's Facsimile Texts, 1880);
- Poems by Thomas Carew (1892);
- Poems of Robert Southwell (1892); and
- Samuel Butler's Hudibras (1892, 3 vols.).

With Julia H. L. De Vaynes, Ebsworth edited The Kentish Garland (2 vols. 1881–2). He also wrote for the Dictionary of National Biography.

== Family ==
On 29 May 1865 Ebsworth married Margaret, eldest daughter of William Blore, rector of Goodmanham, East Yorkshire. She died on 18 April 1906, leaving no issue.

== Notes ==
Attribution

This article incorporates text from a publication now in the public domain: Lee, Sidney, ed. (1912). "Ebsworth, Joseph Woodfall". Dictionary of National Biography (2nd supplement). Vol. 1. London: Smith, Elder & Co.
