= Robert Ainsworth (lexicographer) =

English Latin lexicographer

Robert Ainsworth (September 1660 – 4 April 1743) was an English Latin lexicographer, and author of a well-known compendious Dictionary of the Latin Tongue.

== Life ==
He was born at Wordsall, in the parish of Eccles, Manchester, in September 1660. After he had finished his own education, he began his career as schoolmaster at Bolton; from there he went to London; and at Bethnal Green, Hackney, and other suburban villages, continued to run a school until he retired some years before his death.

Ainsworth died on 4 April 1743, at the age of 82, and was buried at St Matthias Old Church, Poplar, where an inscription in Latin verse, written by himself, was placed over his remains and those of his wife. One of the heirs of his estate was a nephew, Peter Ainsworth (born 1713), who used his uncle's money to establish a successful bleach works at Halliwell in Bolton. He was the grandfather of Peter Ainsworth (1790–1870), a Whig politician.

== Works ==
In 1736, after about twenty years' labour, Ainsworth published his major work, with a dedication to Richard Mead, and a preface explaining his reasons for undertaking it. Improved editions by Samuel Patrick, John Ward, William Young of Gillingham, Isaac Kimber (editing 1751) and Thomas Morell successively appeared; Ward and Young's (1752) in folio, the others in quarto. Nathaniel Thomas's version was from 1758. John Carey's (1816) was a later version; there were also abridgments by Young and Morell. Another 19th-century edition was that of Benjamin Wrigglesworth Beatson with William Ellis, based on the 1752 edition.

Earlier, Ainsworth had published a treatise on education, entitled The most Natural and Easy Way of Institution (1698), in which he advocated the teaching of Latin by conversational methods and deprecates punishment of any sort. Ainsworth was author also Monumenta Vetustatis Kempiana (1720), an expansive account of the classical collection of John Kemp, of A Short Treatise on Grammar, and some smaller pieces. He is said to have been a hunter after old coins and other curiosities.
