= Gray's Inn Lane Hand Axe =

Paleolithic flint hand axe

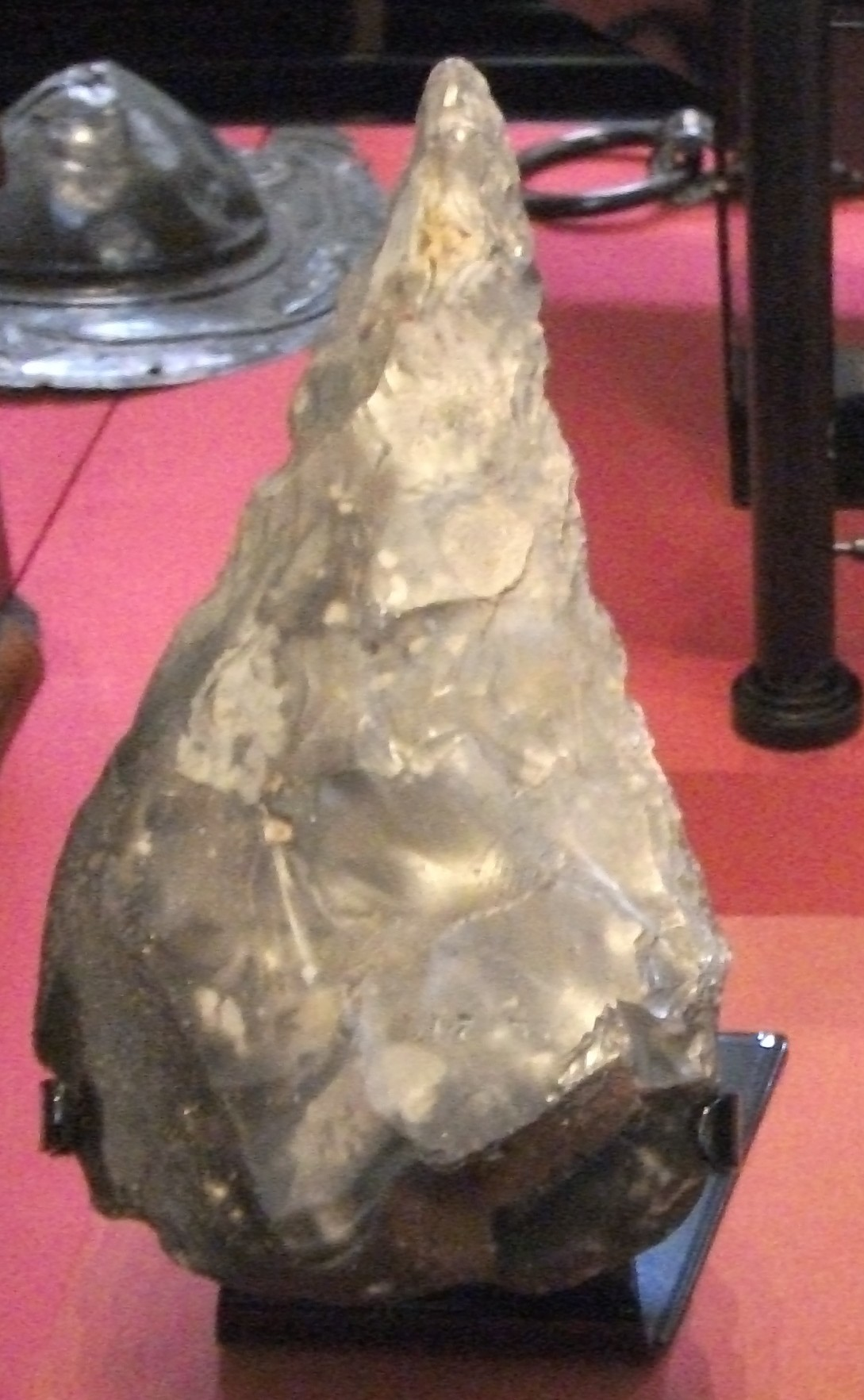
- The hand axe in 2011
- Material: Flint
- Size: 16.5 cm
- Created: c. 350,000 years ago by Homo, species uncertain
- Discovered: 1679; London, England, United Kingdom
- Discovered by: John Conyers
- Present location: British Museum, England, United Kingdom

Location of Gray's Inn Lane in London

The Gray's Inn Lane Hand Axe is a pointed flint hand axe, found buried in gravel under Gray's Inn Lane, London, England, by pioneering archaeologist John Conyers in 1679, and now in the British Museum. The hand axe is a fine example from about 350,000 years ago, in the Lower Paleolithic period, but its main significance lies in the role it and the circumstances of its excavation played in the emerging understanding of early human history.

== Discovery and history ==
John Conyers was present at the excavation in 1679 of the remains of a supposed elephant at Battlebridge in gravel; the site was near Gray's Inn Lane, opposite "Black Mary's", and the remaining tooth was later thought to be of a mammoth or straight-tusked elephant. A pointed flint hand axe was found nearby,

At the time, it was commonly thought that humans had been on Earth for a relatively short period of time, and that stone tools were used by people who simply lacked the knowledge to create metal tools.

Conyers was the first to argue that it was a human artefact. After Conyers' death, John Bagford (c. 1650–1716) published the discovery, rejecting the idea that the assemblage of elephant bones and stone axe had originated from the time of Noah's flood, arguing instead for its origin in the Roman period under the Emperor Claudius; this was in a letter of 1715, in which Bagford accepted the human origin of the handaxe. With other items from Conyers' collection, the handaxe passed to the collection of Hans Sloane, whose own collection was one of the founding collections of the British Museum.

The British Museum estimates that the hand axe is around 350,000 years old. Elephants were living in Britain at this time, during an Ice age when the climate was similar to that of today. The hand axe is currently displayed in the "Enlightenment Gallery" of the British Museum, which is housed in the King's Library.

== See also ==
- Saltley handaxe in Birmingham
