= William Blades =

English printer and bibliographer

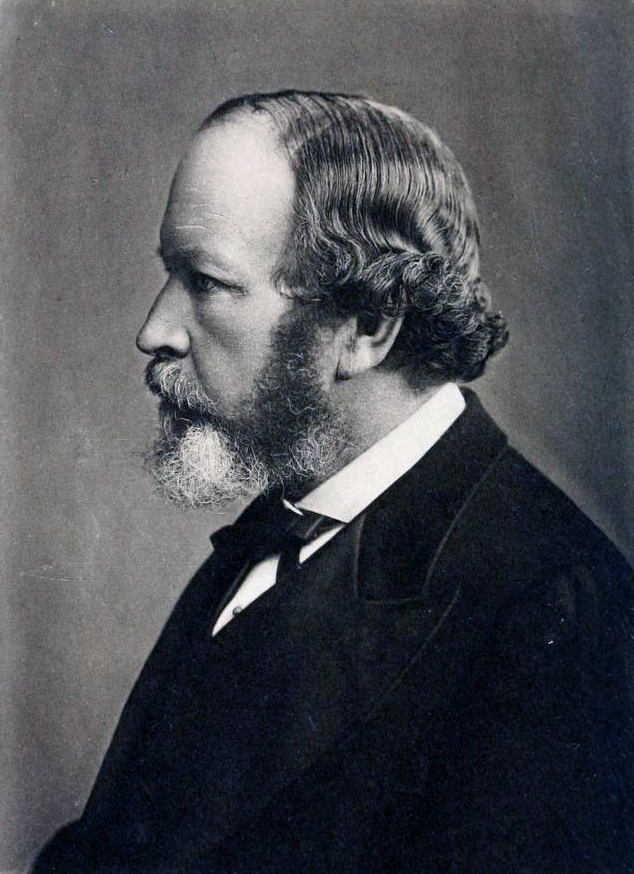
- Born: 5 December 1824; Clapham, London, England
- Died: 27 April 1890 (aged 65); Sutton, London, England
- Occupations: Printer; Bibliographer

Signature
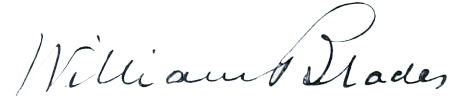

A Catalogue of Books Printed by (or ascribed to the Press of) William Caxton, In which is included the Pressmark of every Copy contained in the Library of the British Museum compiled by William Blades

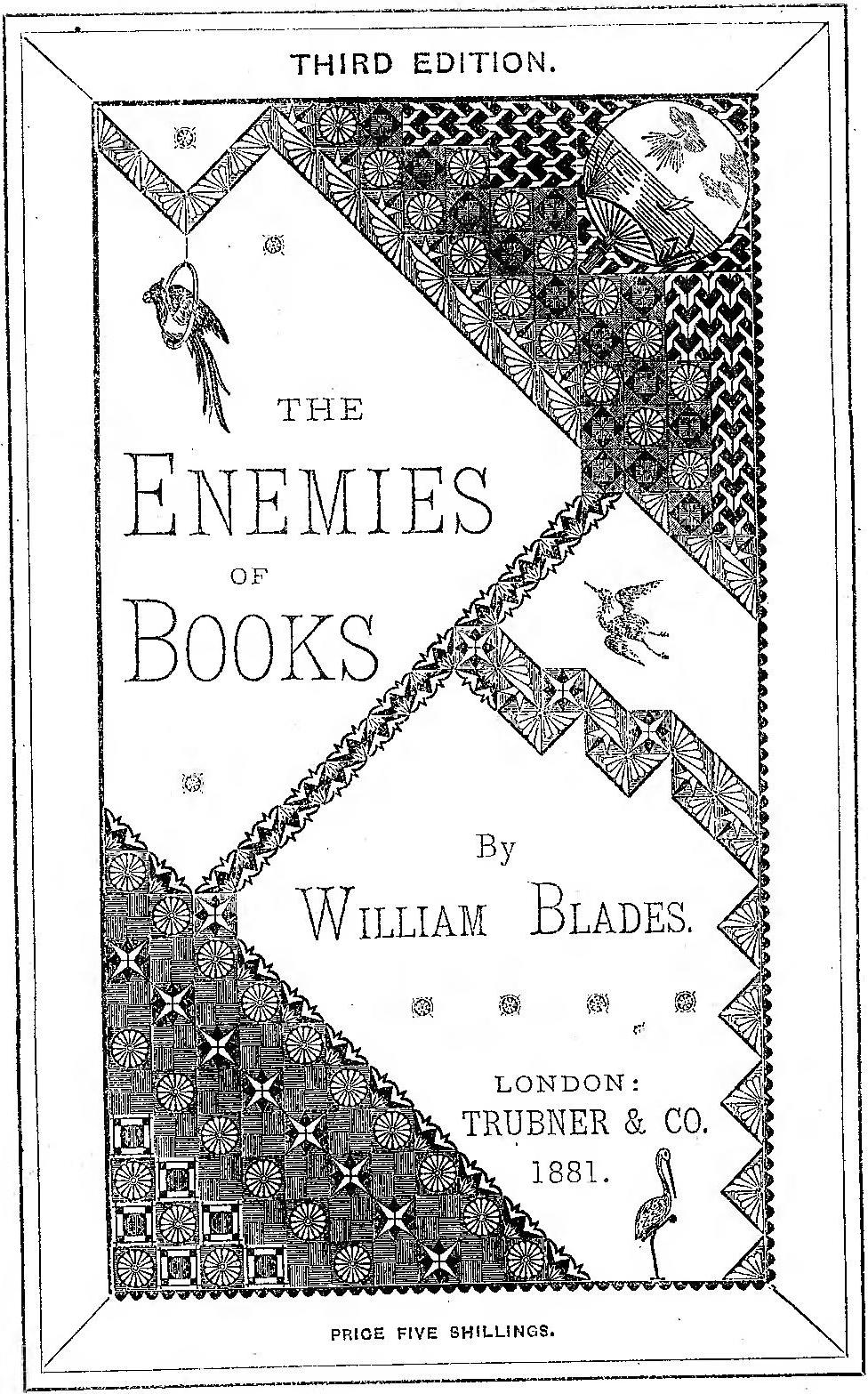
The Enemies of Books by William Blades, Third Edition, London, 1881

William Blades (5 December 1824 – 27 April 1890), English printer and bibliographer, was born at Clapham, London.

== Career ==
In 1840 he was apprenticed to his father's printing business in London, being subsequently taken into partnership. The firm was afterwards known as Blades, East & Blades. His interest in printing led him to make a study of the volumes produced by William Caxton's press, and of the early history of printing in England.

His Life and Typography of William Caxton, England's First Printer, was published in 1861–1863, and the conclusions which he set forth were arrived at by a careful examination of types in the early books, each class of type being traced from its first use to the time when, spoilt by wear, it passed out of Caxton's hands. Some 450 volumes from the Caxton Press were thus carefully compared and classified in chronological order.

In 1877 Blades took an active part in organizing the Caxton celebration, and strongly supported the foundation of the Library Association. He was a keen collector of old books, prints and medals. His publications relate chiefly to the early history of printing. The Enemies of Books was his most popular work, being produced in 1880. He was elected as a member to the American Philosophical Society in 1882.

On his death, his library was acquired by the St Bride Foundation as the initial collection of the library. The architect of the St Bride Foundation building, Robert Cunningham Murray, created a room to house the collection that was a near replica of Blade's original library.

== Death ==
He died at Sutton in Surrey on 27 April 1890.
