= John Woodward (naturalist) =

English naturalist and geologist (1665–1728)

John Woodward MD, FRCP, FRS
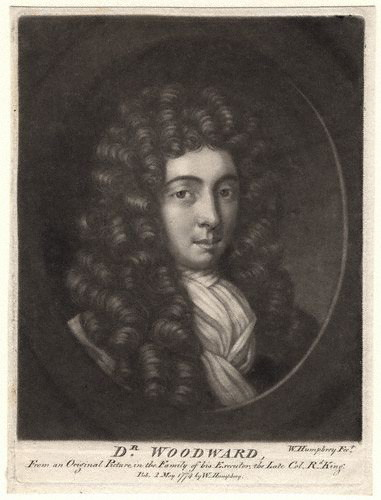
- Born: 1 May 1665; Derbyshire, England
- Died: 25 April 1728 (aged 62); Gresham College
- Burial place: Westminster Abbey
- Occupation: Physician
- Known for: English naturalist and geologist, founder of the Woodwardian Professorship

John Woodward (1 May 1665 – 25 April 1728) was an English naturalist, antiquarian and geologist, and founder by bequest of the Woodwardian Professorship of Geology at the University of Cambridge. Though a leading supporter of observation and experiment, few of his theories have survived.

== Life ==
Woodward was born on 1 May 1665 or perhaps 1668, in a village, possibly Wirksworth, in Derbyshire. His family may have been from Gloucestershire; his mother's maiden surname was Burdett. At the age of 16 he went to London to be apprenticed to a linen draper, but he later studied medicine with Dr Peter Barwick, physician to Charles II. As a leading physician who had never been to university, Woodward was a prominent figure on the "modern" side in the Quarrel of the Ancients and the Moderns in early 18th-century England, on the medical and other fronts.

In 1692 Woodward was appointed Gresham Professor of Physic and in 1693 elected a fellow of the Royal Society. In 1695 he was made an M.D. by Archbishop Tenison and by Cambridge University, this was awarded by Pembroke College. In 1702 he became a fellow of the Royal College of Physicians.

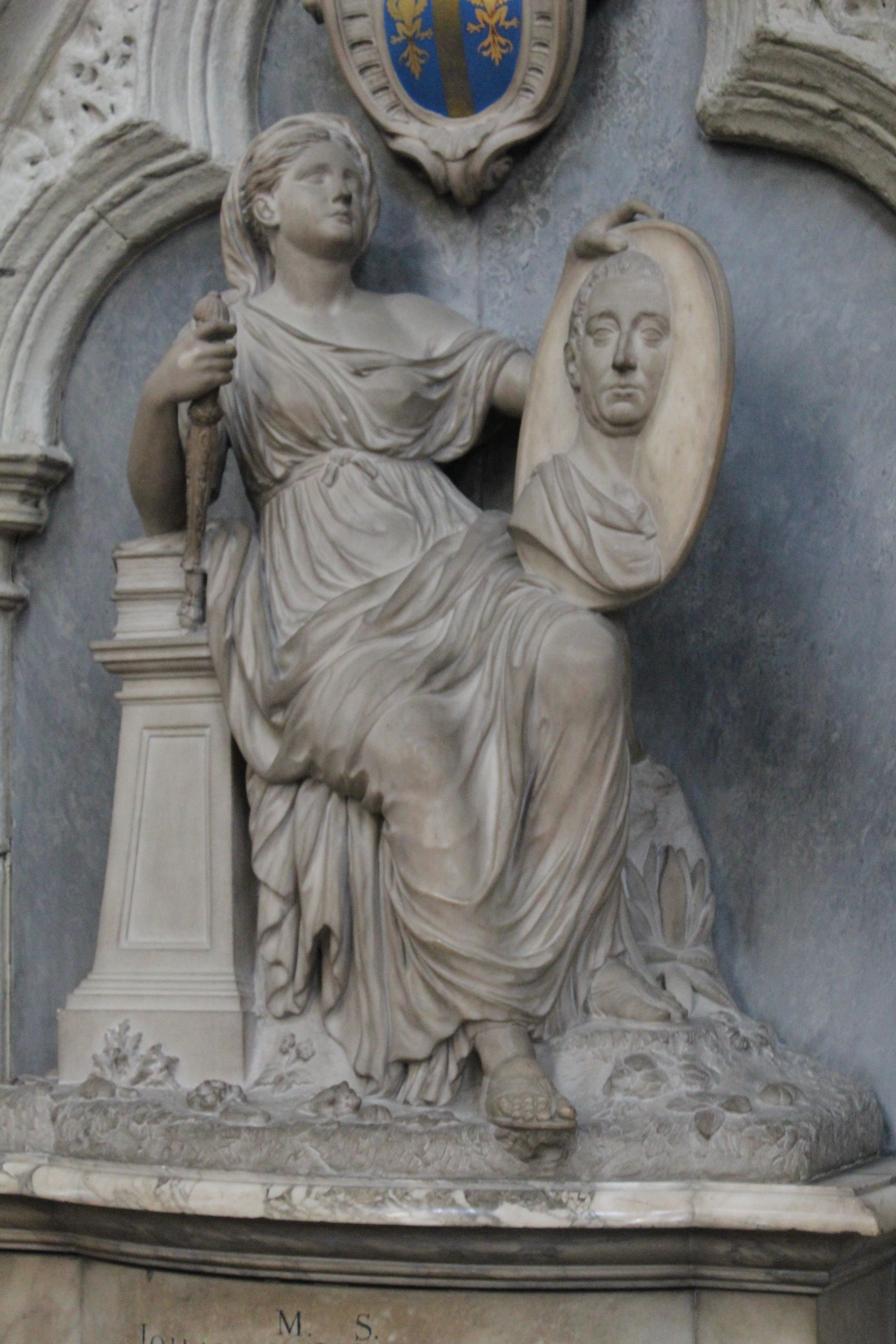
Monument to Woodward in Westminster Abbey

Woodward died in Gresham College on 25 April 1728 and was buried in the nave of Westminster Abbey. In 1732 a memorial to Woodward by the sculptor Peter Scheemakers was erected in the Abbey.

== Works ==
In 1699, John Woodward published his water-culture (hydroponic) experiments with spearmint. He found that plants in less pure water sources grew better than plants in distilled water.

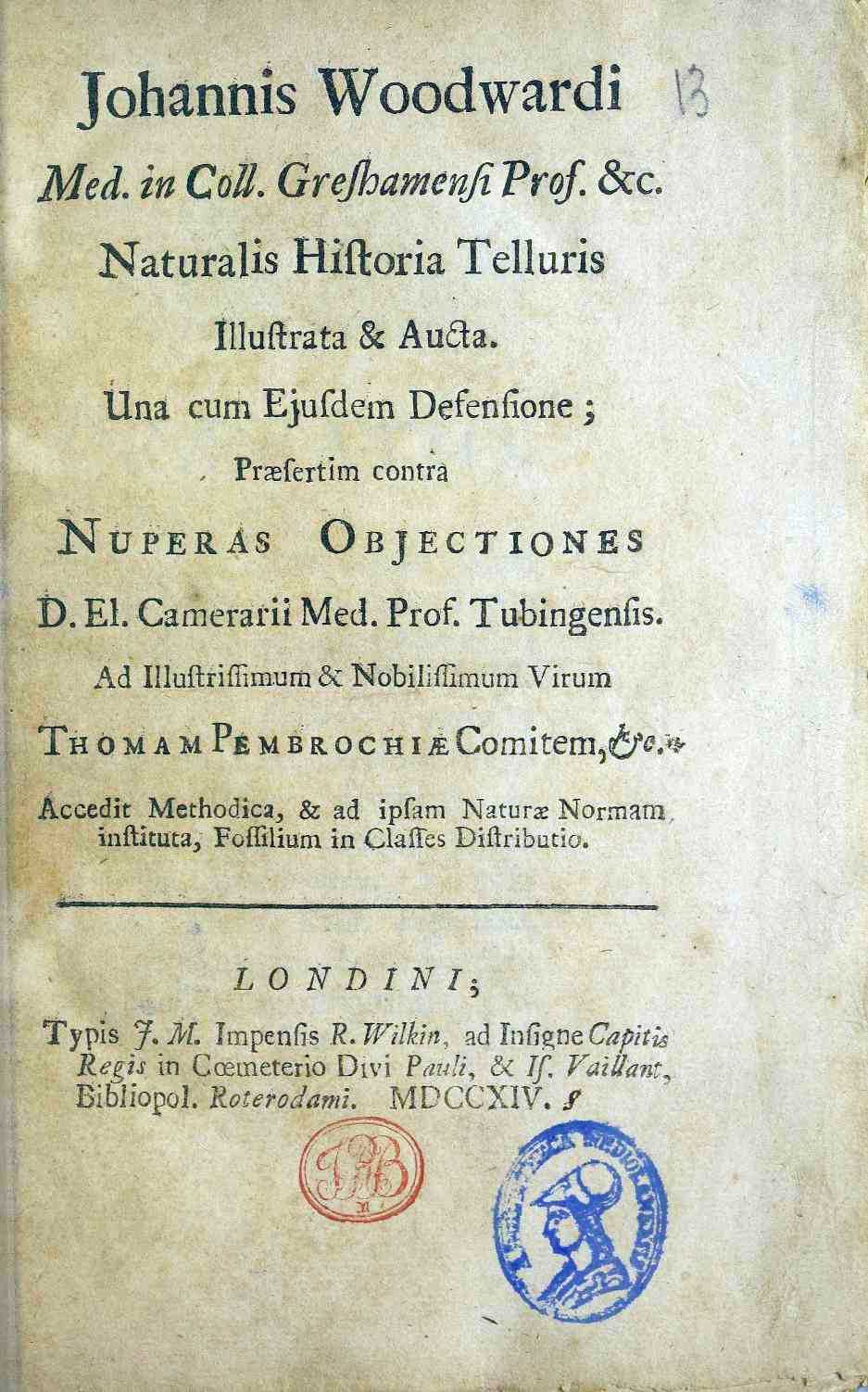
Naturalis historia telluris illustrata et aucta, 1714

While still a student, he became interested in botany and natural history, and his attention during visits to Gloucestershire was drawn to the fossils found there. He began to form the great collection for which he is best known. He published An Essay toward a Natural History of the Earth and Terrestrial Bodies, especially Minerals, &c. in 1695 (2nd edition 1702, 3rd edition 1723), followed by Brief Instructions for making Observations in all Parts of the World (1696). He later wrote An Attempt towards a Natural History of the Fossils of England (2 vols., 1728 and 1729). In these works he showed that the stony surface of the earth was divided into strata, and that the enclosed fossils were originally generated at sea; but his views on the method of rock formation remained unsupported. They were satirized by John Arbuthnot, who ridiculed what he saw as Woodward's classicist method and personal venality. Nonetheless, Woodward accurately described his rocks, minerals and fossils in his elaborate Catalogue.

Woodward's The State of Physick and of Diseases... Particularly of the Smallpox (1718) arose from a long-running dispute over smallpox with John Freind. Both accused the other of killing their patients (in the modern view a judgement few doctors of that period can escape). Woodward claimed that his experimental evidence showed that smallpox arose from an excess of "bilious salts", whereas Freind saw the causes of the disease as unknowable.

== Dr Woodward's shield ==
A notable shield bought by John Conyers from a London ironmonger was sold to Woodward after his death by one of his daughters. The shield, now in the British Museum, is recognised as a classicising French Renaissance buckler of the mid-16th century, perhaps sold from the Royal Armouries of Charles II, but thought by Woodward and others to be Roman. Woodward published a treatise on it in 1713, provoking a satire on the "follies of antiquarianism" by Alexander Pope, written in the same year, but not printed until 1733. Woodward is mentioned twice in Pope's Fourth Satire of Dr. John Donne and is a candidate for the original of "Mummius" in Pope's The Dunciad.

== Bequest ==
Woodward's will directed that his personal estate and effects be sold, and land to the yearly value of £150 purchased and conveyed to the University of Cambridge. A lecturer was to be chosen and paid £100 a year to read at least four lectures a year on a subject treated in his Natural History of the Earth. This created the Woodwardian professorship of geology. He also bequeathed his collection of English fossils to the university, to be under the care of the geology lecturer. This formed the nucleus of the Cambridge Woodwardian Museum, whose specimens have since been moved to the Sedgwick Museum of Earth Sciences.

== Works ==
- Brief Instructions for making Observations in all Parts of the World, 1696
- An Essay toward a Natural History of the Earth and Terrestrial Bodies 1695; 1704; 1714; 3rd ed., 1723; illustrated, inlarged, and defended, 1726
- Remarks upon the antient and present state of London, occasioned by some Roman urns, coins, and other antiquities, lately discovered (3rd edition, 1723)
- An Attempt towards a Natural History of the Fossils of England (2 volumes, 1728 and 1729)

== Sources ==
- Joseph M. Levine (1991), The Battle of the Books: History and Literature in the Augustan Age, Ithaca: Cornell University Press
- Levine, J.M. (2004). "Woodward, John (1665/1668–1728)". Oxford Dictionary of National Biography (online ed.). Oxford University Press. doi:10.1093/ref:odnb/29946. (Subscription, Wikipedia Library access or UK public library membership required.) The first edition of this text is available at Wikisource: Woodward, Bernard Barham (1900). "Woodward, John" . In Lee, Sidney (ed.). Dictionary of National Biography. Vol. 62. London: Smith, Elder & Co. p. 423–425.
