= The Enemies of Books =

1880 book by William Blades

- Author: William Blades
- Language: English
- Subject: Books--Conservation and restoration.
- Publisher: Elliot Stock
- Publication date: 1888
- Publication place: England
- Pages: 165
- Dewey Decimal: 025.8/4
- LC Class: Z701 .B63 1888b
- Website: http://www.gutenberg.org/ebooks/1302

The Enemies of Books is a book on biblioclasm and book preservation by the 19th-century bibliophile and book collector William Blades. The book was first published in 1880 and has been republished in different editions in 1881, 1888, 1896, and 1902 and reproduced widely in electronic format in the 21st century. In the book, Blades, a well-known collector and preserver of the works of the English printer William Caxton, documented his outrage at any mistreatment of books in what became a passionate diatribe against biblioclasts, human and non-human, wherever he found them.

The book includes chapters on the following enemies of books: fire, water, gas and heat, dust and neglect, ignorance and bigotry, the bookworm, bookbinders, book collectors, other vermin (such as rats or flies), servants, and children. The book ends with a passionate call for reverence for old books, something the author felt was lacking during his life.

== See also ==
- Destruction of libraries
