= Joseph Ebsworth =

English dramatist and musician

Joseph Ebsworth (1788–1868) was an English dramatist and musician.

== Early life ==
The elder son of Joseph and Isabella Ebsworth, he was born at Islington, London, on 10 October 1788, and was early apprenticed to a watch-jeweller named Cornwall; he was later selected to reconstruct the watch of the Prince Regent.

== In theatre ==
Having a rich baritone voice, he joined the operatic company at Covent Garden Theatre immediately after fulfilling his indentures, and early turned to dramatic authorship. He also acted in melodrama, and became secretary to David Edward Morris, of the Haymarket Theatre.

In 1822 Ebsworth made a first visit to Scotland. Soon after 1826 he moved from London to Edinburgh, where he held an engagement at the Theatre Royal, as actor and prompter, with his lifelong friend William Henry Murray.

== Later life ==
Ebsworth became established in Edinburgh as teacher of music and singing, and accepted the position of leader of the choir at St. Stephen's Church, which caused him to give up acting; but he continued to write and to translate dramas, which played in London and the provinces. In 1828 he opened an "English and foreign dramatic library and caricature repository" at 23 Elm Row, at the head of Leith Walk, Edinburgh, and for fifteen years maintained it successfully as the main bookseller's shop for periodical literature. Afterwards he resided at 4 Montgomery Street.

Ebsworth's vocal and instrumental concerts at the Hopetoun Rooms, Queen Street, were continued annually from 1830 until within a few weeks of his death. He had known Charles Dibdin, and his own entertainments were on the same model. He was for forty years teacher of music, to private pupils, and at the Merchant Maidens' Hospital, Watson's, and the Normal School. He was also a linguist, collector of astrological documents and amateur artist. He was librarian of the Harmonist Society of Edinburgh.

== Death ==
Of Ebsworth's five children born in Scotland, all died young except two sons. News of the sudden death in Australia of his son Charles (born 24 October 1833) reached him close on midsummer 1868. He died of an apoplectic seizure, three weeks later, on the fifty-first anniversary of his marriage. He was buried at the Dean cemetery, Edinburgh, at the feet of David Scott F.S.A. On the following Sunday his own music was played and sung in churches of all denominations in Edinburgh.

== Works ==
Many of Ebsworth's dramas were printed. They included:

- Crockery's Misfortunes, or Transmogrifications, a burletta, first acted 11 July 1821, at the Royal Coburg Theatre.
- The Two Prisoners of Lyons, or the Duplicate Keys, 1824, an early English adaptation of Robert Macaire.
- Adelaide, or the Fatal Seduction, three acts, translated from René Charles Guilbert de Pixérécourt, performed at the Coburg Theatre.
- The Rival Valets, at the Haymarket, 1825.
- Ourika, the Orphan of Senegal, a petite drama, one act, with songs, music by George Frederick Perry of the Haymarket, 1828.
- Rosalie, or the Bohemian Mother, two acts, as performed at the Haymarket, music by Perry, 1828.
- Rouge et Noir, or Whigs and Widows, two acts, first acted at the Adelphi, Edinburgh, 7 August 1841.
- Ups and Downs.
- Marriage Projects.
- The Calabrian Assassin.
- The Bachelor of Duddington.
- Commerce, a drama in three acts.
- The Tempter, or the Gifts of Immortality, 1830.
- The Twenty Thieves.
- Youth's Vagaries.
- Keeping up Appearances.
- Mr. Walker's Trunks.
- The Advocate's Daughter.
- Clemence.
- Saul Braintree.
- Tam o' Shanter, or Auld Alloway's Haunted Kirk (before 1824, an early dramatisation of the poem Tam o' Shanter by Robert Burns).
- The Mayor of Windgap, or the Strange Man of the Inch.
- The Wreck of the Dauntless.
- Ranting Roaring Willie.
- The Pilot's Son.
- Roslin Castle.
- Summer and Winter.
- A Widow to Let.
- The Legatees.
- The Glass Door.
- The Two Prima Donnas.
- Quite Correct.
- The Queen's Visit;’ and
- The Crusaders, a five-act drama, lavishly produced at the Princess's Theatre by John Medex Maddox about 1851.

With A Short Introduction to Vocal Music, Ebsworth published church music, much of it composed for St. Stephen's Church, Edinburgh, and for his lifelong friend the Rev. Dr. William Muir. His legacy included a manuscript collection of his own songs.

== Family ==
On 22 June 1817 Ebsworth married Mary Emma, eldest daughter of Robert Fairbrother, member of the Glovers' Company. He settled in Lambeth, 3 Gray's Walk, where five of his children were born.
