= Mary Emma Ebsworth =

English dramatist (1794–1881)

Mary Emma Ebsworth (2 September 1794 – 13 October 1881) was an English dramatist.

== Life ==
Ebsworth was born in London. Her mother, Mary Bailey, was said to be the "daughter of Joseph Grimaldi's landlady" and she taught her French as she has been educated in a French convent. Her father was the entertainer Robert Fairbrother, member of the Glovers' Company, and in later years a fencing-master. Her father was a friend of Richard Brinsley Sheridan, and though he had lost several thousand pounds by him would never permit one word to be spoken against him. He was also the schoolmate and lifelong friend of Mrs. Jordan; great efforts were made to induce him to surrender her letters, many from the Duke of Clarence; but he refused any bribe, and himself destroyed all his papers, lest his descendants might be tempted.

Under the signature of 'Sheridonicus' her father wrote for 'Thalia's Tablet, or Melpomene's Memorandum Book,’ of which the first was published on 8 December 1821. Fairbrother married Mary Bailey. One of their sons, Samuel Glover Fairbrother, became a well-known theatrical publisher; another son, Benjamin Smith Fairbrother, who died on 28 August 1878, aged 76, was prompter, stage manager, and treasurer in succession at the chief theatres in London.

== Work ==
French was so habitually spoken and read by Mrs. Fairbrother in the early days of her married life that her daughter, Mary Emma, turned to translating books for the publishers, one of these being a romance of 'Masaniello.' On 22 June 1817 she was married to Joseph Ebsworth, and lived at 3 Gray's Walk, Lambeth, where five of their ten children were born, the eldest being Emilie Marguerite, born in 1818, afterwards wife of Samuel H. Cowell, comedian. Before December 1826 she went to Edinburgh. She was closely associated in dramatic composition and translations with her husband; but several of her independent works were published in John Cumberland's acting drama: 'Payable at Sight; or the Chaste Salute,’ acted at the Surrey Theatre, &c.; 'The Two Brothers of Pisa,’ with music by T. Hughes, at the Royal Coburg, printed 1828; 'Ass's Skin;’ and, among many others, perhaps her best work, often acted, 'The Sculptor of Florence.' She was of a most retiring and unselfish nature, loving a private life with the constant care of her children and of her parents, who joined her in Edinburgh. Mrs. Ebsworth survived her husband thirteen years; all but three of her children died before her.

She returned to London in 1879, and died where she lived at 57 Boyson Road, Walworth, Surrey, aged 87; she was buried on the 19th at West Norwood Cemetery.
